= List of state schools in Scotland (council areas excluding cities, E–H) =

The following is a partial list of currently operating state schools in the unitary council areas of East Ayrshire, East Dunbartonshire, East Lothian, East Renfrewshire, Falkirk, Fife and Highland in Scotland, United Kingdom. You may also find Category:Schools in Scotland of use to find a particular school. See also the List of the oldest schools in the United Kingdom.

By unitary council area.

Note that the allocations to address and council area may not be accurate in every case and you can help if you have access to local directories.

== East Ayrshire ==
=== Nursery schools ===
- Cairns Early Childhood Centre, Kilmarnock
- Cherry Trees Early Childhood Centre, Cumnock
- Flowerbank Early Childhood Centre, Kilmarnock
- Hillbank Early Childhood Centre, Kilmarnock
- Riccarton Early Childhood Centre, Kilmarnock

=== Primary schools ===
- Annanhill Primary School, Kilmarnock
- Auchinleck Primary School, Auchinleck
- Bellsbank Primary School, Bellsbank
- Catrine Primary School, Catrine
- Crosshouse Primary School, Crosshouse
- Dalmellington Primary School, Dalmellington
- Dalrymple Primary School, Dalrymple
- Darvel Primary School, Darvel
- Drongan Primary School, Drongan
- Dunlop Primary School, Dunlop
- Fenwick Primary School, Fenwick
- Galston Primary School, Galston
- Gargieston Primary School, Kilmarnock
- Hillhead Primary School, Kilmarnock
- Hurlford Primary School, Hurlford
- James Hamilton Primary School, Kilmarnock
- Kilmaurs Primary School, Kilmaurs
- Lainshaw Primary School, Stewarton
- Littlemill Primary School, Rankinston
- Loanhead Primary School, Kilmarnock
- Lochnorris Primary School, Cumnock
- Logan Primary School, Logan
- Mauchline Primary School, Mauchline
- Mount Carmel Primary School, Kilmarnock
- Muirkirk Primary School, Muirkirk
- Nether Robertland Primary School, Stewarton
- Netherthird Primary School, Cumnock
- New Cumnock Primary School, New Cumnock
- Newmilns Primary School, Newmilns
- Ochiltree Primary School, Ochiltree
- Onthank Primary School, Kilmarnock
- Patna Primary School, Patna
- Shortlees Primary School, Kilmarnock
- Sorn Primary School, Sorn
- St. Andrew's Primary School, Kilmarnock
- St. Patrick's Primary School, Auchinleck
- St. Sophia's Primary School, Galston
- St. Xavier's Primary School, Patna
- Whatriggs Primary School, Kilmarnock

=== Secondary schools ===
- Doon Academy, Dalmellington
- Grange Academy, Kilmarnock
- Kilmarnock Academy, Kilmarnock
- Loudoun Academy, Galston
- Robert Burns Academy, Cumnock
- Saint Joseph's Academy, Kilmarnock
- Stewarton Academy, Stewarton

=== Special schools ===
- Hillside School, Cumnock
- Park School, Kilmarnock
- Willowbank School, Kilmarnock

== East Dunbartonshire ==
=== Nursery Schools ===
- Auchinairn Early Learning & Childcare Centre, Auchinairn

=== Primary schools ===
- Baldernock Primary School, Torrance
- Baljaffray Primary School, Bearsden
- Balmuildy Primary School, Bishopbriggs
- Bearsden Primary School, Bearsden
- Castlehill Primary School, Bearsden
- Clober Primary School, Milngavie
- Colquhoun Park Primary School, Bearsden
- Craigdhu Primary School, Milngavie
- Craighead Primary School, Milton of Campsie
- Gartconner Primary School, Kirkintilloch
- Harestanes Primary School, Kirkintilloch
- Hillhead Primary School, Kirkintilloch
- Holy Family Primary School, Kirkintilloch
- Holy Trinity Primary School, Kirkintilloch
- Killermont Primary School, Bearsden
- Lairdsland Primary School, Kirkintilloch
- Lennoxtown Primary School, Lennoxtown
- Lenzie Meadow Primary School, Lenzie
- Meadowburn Primary School, Bishopbriggs
- Millersneuk Primary School, Lenzie
- Milngavie Primary School, Milngavie
- Mosshead Primary School, Bearsden
- Oxgang Primary School, Kirkintilloch
- St. Helen's Primary School, Bishopbriggs
- St. Machan's Primary School, Lennoxtown
- St. Matthew's Primary School, Bishopbriggs
- St. Nicholas' Primary School, Bearsden
- Thomas Muir Primary School, Bishopbriggs
- Torrance Primary School, Torrance
- Twechar Primary School, Twechar
- Wester Cleddens Primary School, Bishopbriggs
- Westerton Primary School, Bearsden

=== Secondary schools ===
- Bearsden Academy, Bearsden
- Bishopbriggs Academy, Bishopbriggs
- Boclair Academy, Bearsden
- Douglas Academy, Milngavie
- Kirkintilloch High School, Kirkintilloch
- Lenzie Academy, Lenzie
- St. Ninian's High School, Kirkintilloch
- Turnbull High School, Bishopbriggs

=== Special schools ===
- Woodland View School, Kirkintilloch

== East Lothian ==
=== Nursery schools ===
- Olivebank Children and Family Centre, Musselburgh

=== Primary schools ===
- Aberlady Primary School, Aberlady
- Athelstaneford Primary School, Athelstaneford
- Blindwells Primary School, Prestonpans
- Campie Primary School, Musselburgh
- Cockenzie Primary School, Cockenzie and Port Seton
- Craighall Primary School, Musselburgh
- Dirleton Primary School, Dirleton
- Dunbar Primary School, Dunbar
- East Linton Primary School, East Linton
- Elphinstone Primary School, Elphinstone
- Gullane Primary School, Gullane
- Haddington Primary School, Haddington
- Humbie Primary School, Humbie
- Innerwick Primary School, Innerwick
- Law Primary School, North Berwick
- Letham Mains Primary School, Haddington
- Longniddry Primary School, Longniddry
- Loretto R.C. Primary School, Musselburgh
- Macmerry Primary School, Macmerry
- Musselburgh Burgh Primary School, Musselburgh
- Ormiston Primary School, Ormiston
- Pencaitland Primary School, Pencaitland
- Pinkie St Peter's Primary School, Musselburgh
- Preston Tower Primary School, Prestonpans
- Saltoun Primary School, East Saltoun
- Sanderson's Wynd Primary School, Tranent
- St. Gabriel's R.C. Primary School, Prestonpans
- St. Martin's R.C Primary School, Tranent
- St. Mary's R.C. Primary School, Haddington
- Stenton Primary School, Stenton
- Stoneyhill Primary School, Musselburgh
- Wallyford Primary School, Wallyford
- West Barns Primary School, Dunbar
- Whitecraig Primary School, Musselburgh
- Windygoul Primary School, Tranent
- Yester Primary School, Gifford

=== Secondary schools ===
- Dunbar Grammar School, Dunbar
- Knox Academy, Haddington
- Musselburgh Grammar School, Musselburgh
- North Berwick High School, North Berwick
- Preston Lodge High School, Prestonpans
- Ross High School, Tranent
- Rosehill High School, Musselburgh

== East Renfrewshire ==
=== Nursery schools ===
- Arthurlie Family Centre, Barrhead
- Carlibar Family Centre, Barrhead
- Cart Mill Family Centre, Clarkston
- Glen Family Centre, Thornliebank
- Glenwood Family Centre, Thornliebank
- Hazeldene Family Centre, Newton Mearns
- Madras Family Centre, Neilston
- McCready Family Centre, Barrhead

=== Primary schools ===
- Braidbar Primary School, Giffnock
- Busby Primary School, Clarkston
- Calderwood Lodge Primary School, Newton Mearns
- Carlibar Primary School, Barrhead
- Carolside Primary School, Clarkston
- Crookfur Primary School, Newton Mearns
- Cross Arthurlie Primary School, Barrhead
- Eaglesham Primary School, Eaglesham
- Giffnock Primary School, Giffnock
- Hillview Primary School, Barrhead
- Kirkhill Primary School, Newton Mearns
- Maidenhill Primary School, Newton Mearns
- Mearns Primary School, Newton Mearns
- Neilston Primary School, Neilston
- Netherlee Primary School, Netherlee
- Our Lady of the Missions Primary School, Thornliebank or Giffnock
- St. Cadoc's Primary School, Newton Mearns
- St. Clare's Primary School, Newton Mearns
- St. John's Primary School, Barrhead
- St. Joseph's Primary School, Busby
- St. Mark's Primary School, Barrhead
- St. Thomas' Primary School, Neilston
- Thornliebank Primary School, Thornliebank
- Uplawmoor Primary School, Uplawmoor

=== Secondary schools ===
- Barrhead High School, Barrhead
- Eastwood High School, Newton Mearns
- Mearns Castle High School, Newton Mearns
- St Luke's High School, Barrhead
- St Ninian's High School, Giffnock
- Williamwood High School, Clarkston
- Woodfarm High School, Thornliebank

=== Special schools ===
- Isobel Mair School, Newton Mearns

== Falkirk ==
=== Nursery schools ===
- Bonnypark Early Learning and Childcare Centre, Bonnybridge
- Camelon Early Learning and Childcare Centre, Camelon
- Inchlair Nursery, Stenhousemuir
- Kinneil Early Years Campus, Bo'ness
- Larbert Early Learning and Childcare Centre, Larbert
- Myot View Early Learning and Childcare Centre, Denny
- Parkhill Early Learning and Childcare Campus, Polmont
- Queen Street Early Learning and Childcare Centre, Falkirk
- Rannoch Early Learning and Childcare Centre, Grangemouth

=== Primary schools ===
- Airth Primary School, Airth
- Antonine Primary School, Bonnybridge
- Avonbridge Primary School, Avonbridge
- Bainsford Primary School, Bainsford
- Bankier Primary School, Banknock
- Bantaskin Primary School, Falkirk
- Beancross Primary School, Grangemouth
- Blackness Primary School, Blackness
- Bo'ness Public Primary School, Bo'ness
- Bonnybridge Primary School, Bonnybridge
- Bowhouse Primary School, Grangemouth
- California Primary School, California
- Carmuirs Primary School, Camelon
- Carron Primary School, Carron
- Carronshore Primary School, Carronshore
- Comely Park Primary School, Falkirk
- Deanburn Primary School, Bo'ness
- Denny Primary School, Denny
- Drumbowie Primary School, Standburn
- Dunipace Primary School, Dunipace
- Easter Carmuirs Primary School, Camelon
- Grange Primary School, Bo'ness
- Hallglen Primary School, Glen Village
- Head of Muir Primary School, Denny
- Kinnaird Primary School, Larbert
- Kinneil Primary and Early Years Campus, Bo'ness
- Ladeside Primary School, Larbert
- Langlees Primary School, Bainsford
- Larbert Village Primary School, Larbert
- Laurieston Primary School, Laurieston
- Maddiston Primary School, Maddiston
- Moray Primary School, Grangemouth
- Nethermains Primary School, Denny
- Sacred Heart R.C. Primary School, Grangemouth
- Shieldhill Primary School, Shieldhill
- Slamannan Primary School, Slamannan
- St. Andrew's R.C. Primary School, Falkirk
- St. Bernadette's R.C. Primary School, Stenhousemuir
- St. Francis Xavier's R.C. Primary School, Bainsford
- St. Joseph's R.C. Primary School, Bonnybridge
- St. Margaret's Primary School, Polmont
- St. Mary's R.C. Primary School, Bo'ness
- St. Patrick's R.C. Primary School, Denny
- Stenhousemuir Primary School, Stenhousemuir
- Victoria Primary School, Falkirk
- Wallacestone Primary School, Brightons
- Westquarter Primary School, Westquarter
- Whitecross Primary School, Whitecross

=== Secondary schools ===
- Bo'ness Academy, Bo'ness
- Braes High School, Reddingmuirhead
- Denny High School, Denny
- Falkirk High School, Falkirk
- Graeme High School, Falkirk
- Grangemouth High School, Grangemouth
- Larbert High School, Larbert
- St Mungo's High School, Bainsford

=== Special schools ===
- Carrongrange High School, Larbert
- Mariner Support Service, Falkirk
- Oxgang School and Support Service, Grangemouth
- Windsor Park School, Falkirk

== Fife ==
=== Nursery schools ===
- Secret Garden (outdoor nursery), Letham

=== Primary schools ===
- Aberdour Primary School, Aberdour
- Aberhill Primary School, Methil
- Anstruther Primary School, Anstruther
- Auchtermuchty Primary School, Auchtermuchty
- Auchtertool Primary School, Auchtertool
- Balcurvie Primary School, Windygates
- Balmerino Primary School, Gauldry
- Balmullo Primary School, Balmullo
- Bellyeoman Primary School, Dunfermline
- Benarty Primary School, Lochore
- Blairhall Primary School, Blairhall
- Buckhaven Primary School, Buckhaven
- Burntisland Primary School, Burntisland
- Cairneyhill Primary and Community School, Cairneyhill
- Camdean Primary School, Rosyth
- Canmore Primary School, Dunfermline
- Canongate Primary School, St. Andrews
- Capshard Primary School, Kirkcaldy
- Cardenden Primary School, Cardenden
- Carleton Primary School, Glenrothes
- Carneige Primary School, Dunfermline
- Carnock Primary School, Carnock
- Caskieberran Primary School, Glenrothes
- Castlehill Primary School, Cupar
- Ceres Primary School, Ceres
- Coaltown of Balgonie Primary School, Coaltown of Balgonie
- Coaltown of Wemyss Primary School, Coaltown of Wemyss
- Colinsburgh Primary School, Colinsburgh
- Collydean Primary School, Glenrothes
- Commercial Primary School, Dunfermline
- Cowdenbeath Primary School, Cowdenbeath
- Craigrothie Primary School, Craigrothie
- Crail Primary School, Crail
- Crossford Primary School, Crossford
- Crossgates Primary School, Crossgates
- Culross Primary School, Culross
- Dairsie Primary School, Dairsie
- Dalgety Bay Primary School, Dalgety Bay
- Denbeath Primary School, Buckhaven
- Denend Primary School, Cardenden
- Donibristle Primary School, Dalgety Bay
- Duloch Primary School, Dunfermline
- Dunbog Primary School, Cupar
- Dunnikier Primary School, Kirkcaldy
- Dysart Primary School, Dysart
- East Wemyss Primary School, East Wemyss
- Elie Primary School, Elie
- Fair Isle Primary School, Kirkcaldy
- Falkland Primary School, Falkland
- Foulford Primary School, Cowdenbeath
- Freuchie Primary School, Freuchie
- Greyfriars R.C. Primary School, St. Andrews
- Guardbridge Primary School, Guardbridge
- Hill of Beath Primary School, Hill of Beath
- Holy Name R.C. Primary School, Oakley
- Inverkeithing Primary School, Inverkeithing
- Inzievar Primary School, Oakley
- Kelty Primary School, Kelty
- Kennoway Primary and Community School, Kennoway
- Kettle Primary School, Kingskettle
- Kinghorn Primary School, Kinghorn
- Kinglassie Primary School, Kinglassie
- Kings Road Primary School, Rosyth
- Kingsbarns Primary School, Kingsbarns
- Kirkcaldy North Primary School, Kirkcaldy
- Kirkcaldy West Primary School, Kirkcaldy
- Kirkton of Largo Primary School, Upper Largo
- Ladybank Primary School, Ladybank
- Largoward Primary School, Largoward
- Lawhead Primary School, St. Andrews
- Leslie Primary School, Leslie
- Letham Primary School, Letham
- Leuchars Primary School, Leuchars
- Limekilns Primary School, Limekilns
- Lochgelly South Primary School, Lochgelly
- Lochgelly West Primary School, Lochgelly
- Lumphinnans Primary Community School, Lumphinnans
- Lundin Mill Primary School, Lundin Links
- Lynburn Primary School, Dunfermline
- Markinch Primary School, Markinch
- Masterton Primary School, Dunfermline
- McLean Primary School, Dunfermline
- Methilhill Primary School, Methilhill
- Milesmark Primary School, Dunfermline
- Milton of Balgonie Primary School, Milton of Balgonie
- Mountfleurie Primary School, Leven
- Newburgh Primary School, Newburgh
- Newcastle Primary School, Glenrothes
- Newport Primary School, Newport-on-Tay
- North Queensferry Primary School, North Queensferry
- Park Road Primary School, Rosyth
- Parkhill Primary School, Leven
- Pathhead Primary School, Kirkcaldy
- Pitcoudie Primary School, Glenrothes
- Pitlessie Primary School, Pitlessie
- Pitreavie Primary School, Dunfermline
- Pittencrieff Primary School, Dunfermline
- Pittenweem Primary School, Pittenweem
- Pitteuchar East Primary School, Glenrothes
- Pitteuchar West Primary School, Glenrothes
- Rimbleton Primary School, Glenrothes
- Saline Primary School, Saline
- Sinclairtown Primary School, Kirkcaldy
- South Parks Primary School, Glenrothes
- Southwood Primary School, Glenrothes
- Springfield Primary School, Springfield
- St. Agatha's R.C. Primary School, Leven
- St. Bride's R.C. Primary School, Cowdenbeath
- St. Columba's R.C. Primary School, Cupar
- St. John's R.C. Primary School, Rosyth
- St. Joseph's R.C. Primary School, Kelty
- St. Kenneth's R.C. Primary School, Ballingry
- St. Leonard's Primary School, Dunfermline
- St. Margaret's R.C. Primary School, Dunfermline
- St. Marie's R.C. Primary School, Kirkcaldy
- St. Monans Primary School, St Monans
- St. Ninian's R.C. Primary School, Cardenden
- St. Patrick's R.C. Primary School, Lochgelly
- St. Paul's R.C. Primary School, Glenrothes
- St. Serf's R.C. Primary School, High Valleyfield
- Star Primary School, Star
- Strathallan Primary School, Kirkcaldy
- Strathkinness Primary School, Strathkinness
- Strathmiglo Primary School, Strathmiglo
- Tayport Primary School, Tayport
- Thornton Primary School, Thornton
- Torbain Primary School, Kirkcaldy
- Torryburn Primary School, Newmills
- Touch Primary School, Dunfermline
- Townhill Primary School, Dunfermline
- Tulliallan Primary School, Kincardine on Forth
- Valley Primary School, Kirkcaldy
- Wormit Primary School, Wormit

=== Secondary schools ===
- Auchmuty High School, Glenrothes
- Balwearie High School, Kirkcaldy
- Beath High School, Cowdenbeath
- Bell Baxter High School, Cupar
- Caledonia High School, Rosyth
- Dunfermline High School, Dunfermline
- Glenrothes High School, Glenrothes
- Glenwood High School, Glenrothes
- Inverkeithing High School, Inverkeithing
- Kirkcaldy High School, Kirkcaldy
- Levenmouth Academy, Buckhaven
- Lochgelly High School, Lochgelly
- Madras College, St. Andrews
- Queen Anne High School, Dunfermline
- St. Andrew's R.C. High School, Kirkcaldy
- St. Columba's R.C. High School, Dunfermline
- Viewforth High School, Kirkcaldy
- Waid Academy, Anstruther
- Woodmill High School, Dunfermline

=== Special schools ===
- Calaiswood School, Dunfermline
- Hyndhead School, Buckhaven
- John Fergus School, Glenrothes
- Kilmaron School, Cupar
- Rosslyn School, Kirkcaldy
- Woodmill ASN, Dunfermline

== Highland ==
=== Primary schools ===
- Abernethy Primary School, Nethy Bridge
- Acharacle Primary School, Acharacle
- Achiltibuie Primary School, Ullapool
- Aldourie Primary School, Aldourie
- Alvie Primary School, Kingussie
- Applecross Primary School, Strathcarron
- Ardersier Primary School, Ardersier
- Ardgour Primary School, Ardgour
- Ardross Primary School, Alness
- Arisaig Primary School, Arisaig
- Auchtertyre Primary School, Kyle of Lochalsh
- Auldearn Primary School, Auldearn
- Aviemore Primary School, Aviemore
- Avoch Primary School, Avoch
- Ballachulish Primary School, Ballachulish
- Balloch Primary School, Balloch
- Balnain Primary School, Balnain
- Banavie Primary School, Fort William
- Beauly Primary School, Beauly
- Ben Wyvis Primary School, Conon Bridge
- Bishop Eden's Primary School, Inverness
- Bonar Bridge Primary School, Ardgay
- Bower Primary School, by Wick
- Bridgend Primary School, Alness
- Broadford Primary School, Isle of Skye
- Brora Primary School, Brora
- Bualnaluib Primary School, Aultbea
- Bun-sgoil Ghàidhlig Inbhir Nis, Inverness
- Bun-sgoil Ghàidhlig Loch Abar, Fort William
- Bun-Sgoil Ghàidhlig Phort Rìgh, Isle of Skye
- Bun-sgoil Shlèite, Sleat, Isle of Skye
- Canisbay Primary School, Wick
- Cannich Bridge Primary School, Beauly
- Caol Primary School, Fort William
- Carbost Primary School, Isle of Skye
- Carrbridge Primary School, Carrbridge
- Castletown Primary School, Thurso
- Cauldeen Primary School, Inverness
- Cawdor Primary School, Nairn
- Central Primary School, Inverness
- Coulhill Primary School, Alness
- Cradlehall Primary School, Inverness
- Cromarty Primary School, Cromarty
- Crossroads Primary School, Thurso
- Crown Primary School, Inverness
- Croy Primary School, Inverness
- Culbokie Primary School, Dingwall
- Dalneigh Primary School, Inverness
- Deshar Primary School, Boat of Garten
- Dingwall Primary School, Dingwall
- Dochgarroch Primary School, Inverness
- Dornoch Primary School, Dornoch
- Drakies Primary School, Inverness
- Dunbeath Primary School, Dunbeath
- Duncan Forbes Primary School, Culloden
- Dunvegan Primary School, Isle of Skye
- Durness Primary School, Durness
- Duror Primary School, Appin
- Edinbane Primary School, Isle of Skye
- Eigg Primary School, Isle of Eigg
- Farr Primary School, Inverness
- Farr Primary School, Sutherland
- Ferintosh Primary School, Easter Kinkell
- Gairloch Primary School, Gairloch
- Gledfield Primary School, Ardgay
- Glencoe Primary School, Glencoe
- Glenelg Primary School, Glenelg
- Glenurquhart Primary School, Drumnadrochit
- Golspie Primary School, Sutherland
- Grantown Primary School, Grantown-on-Spey
- Halkirk Primary School, Halkirk
- Helmsdale Primary School, Helmsdale
- Hill of Fearn Primary School, Fearn
- Hilton of Cadboll Primary School, Fearn
- Hilton Primary School, Hilton
- Holm Primary School, Inverness
- Inshes Primary School, Inverness
- Inver Primary School, Tain
- Invergarry Primary School, Invergarry
- Inverie Primary School, Knoydart
- Inverlochy Primary School, Fort William
- Keiss Primary School, Wick
- Kilchoan Primary School, Acharacle
- Kilchuimen Primary School, Fort Augustus
- Kilmuir Primary School, Isle of Skye
- Kiltearn Primary School, Evanton
- Kingussie Primary School, Kingussie
- Kinlochbervie Primary School, Lairg
- Kinlochleven Primary School, Kinlochleven
- Kinmylies Primary School, Inverness
- Kirkhill Primary School, Kirkhill
- Kyle Primary School, Kyle of Lochalsh
- Kyleakin Primary School, Isle of Skye
- Lady Lovat Primary School, Morar
- Lairg Primary School, Lairg
- Loch Duich Primary School, Inverinate
- Lochaline Primary School, Lochaline
- Lochardil Primary School, Inverness
- Lochcarron Primary School, Lochcarron
- Lochinver Primary School, Lochinver
- Lundavra Primary School, Fort William
- Lybster Primary School, Lybster
- MacDiarmid Primary School, Carbost
- Mallaig Primary School, Mallaig
- Marybank Primary School, Muir of Ord
- Melvich Primary School, Thurso
- Merkinch Primary School, Inverness
- Millbank Primary School, Nairn
- Miller Academy Primary School, Thurso
- Milton of Leys Primary School, Milton of Leys
- Milton Primary School, Invergordon
- Mount Pleasant Primary School, Thurso
- Muck Primary School, Mallaig
- Muirtown Primary School, Inverness
- Mulbuie Primary School, Muir of Ord
- Munlochy Primary School, Munlochy
- Ness Castle Primary School, Inverness
- Newmore Primary School, Invergordon
- Newton Park Primary School, Wick
- Newtonmore Primary School, Newtonmore
- North Kessock Primary School, North Kessock
- Noss Primary School, Wick
- Obsdale Primary School, Alness
- Park Primary School, Invergordon
- Pennyland Primary School, Thurso
- Plockton Primary School, Plockton
- Poolewe Primary School, Achnasheen
- Portree Primary School, Isle of Skye
- Raasay Primary School, Isle of Raasay
- Raigmore Primary School, Inverness
- Reay Primary School, Thurso
- Resolis Primary School, Dingwall
- Rogart Primary School, Rogart
- Rosebank Primary School, Nairn
- Rosehall Primary School, Lairg
- Rum Primary School, Isle of Rum
- Scoraig Primary School, Dundonnell
- Scourie Primary School, Scourie
- Shieldaig Primary School, Strathcarron
- Smithton Primary School, Inverness
- South Lodge Primary School, Invergordon
- Spean Bridge Primary School, Spean Bridge
- St. Bride's Primary School, Fort William
- St. Columba's R.C Primary School, Caol
- St. Joseph's R.C. Primary School, Inverness
- Staffin Primary School, Isle of Skye
- Strathconon Primary School, Muir of Ord
- Strathdearn Primary School, Tomatin
- Stratherrick Primary School, Inverness
- Strathgarve Primary School, Garve
- Strathpeffer Primary School, Strathpeffer
- Strontian Primary School, Strontian
- Tarbat Old Primary School, Portmahomack
- Tarradale Primary School, Muir of Ord
- Teanassie Primary School, Beauly
- Thrumster Primary School, Wick
- Tomnacross Primary School, Kiltarlity
- Tongue Primary School, Tongue
- Tore Primary School, Muir of Ord
- Ullapool Primary School, Ullapool
- Watten Primary School, Watten

=== Secondary schools ===
- Alness Academy, Alness
- Ardnamurchan High School, Strontian
- Charleston Academy, Inverness
- Culloden Academy, Inverness
- Dingwall Academy, Dingwall
- Dornoch Academy, Dornoch
- Farr High School, Bettyhill
- Fortrose Academy, Fortrose
- Gairloch High School, Gairloch
- Glen Urquhart High School, Drumnadrochit
- Golspie High School, Golspie
- Grantown Grammar School, Grantown-on-Spey
- Invergordon Academy, Invergordon
- Inverness High School, Inverness
- Inverness Royal Academy, Inverness
- Kilchuimen Academy, Fort Augustus
- Kingussie High School, Kingussie
- Kinlochbervie High School, Kinlochbervie
- Kinlochleven High School, Kinlochleven
- Lochaber High School, Fort William
- Mallaig High School, Mallaig
- Millburn Academy, Inverness
- Nairn Academy, Nairn
- Plockton High School, Plockton
- Portree High School, Isle of Skye
- Tain Royal Academy, Tain
- Thurso High School, Thurso
- Ullapool High School, Ullapool
- Wick High School, Wick

=== Special schools ===
- Drummond School, Inverness
- St. Clement's School, Dingwall
- St. Duthus School, Tain
- The Bridge, Inverness

== Other schools in Scotland ==
- List of independent schools in Scotland
- List of state schools in Scotland (city council areas)
- List of state schools in Scotland (council areas excluding cities, A–D)
- List of state schools in Scotland (council areas excluding cities, I–R)
- List of state schools in Scotland (council areas excluding cities, S–W)

== See also ==
- Education in the United Kingdom
- Education in Scotland
- Education Scotland
