= Falkirk Braes =

Geographical entity in Falkirk, Scotland

Coordinates: 55.986218°N 3.727595°W

The Falkirk Braes (Scottish Gaelic: Bràighe na h-Eaglaise Brice) is a geographical and sociopolitical entity within the Falkirk local authority area in Scotland. The population (both suburban and rural) is approximately 32,000 (2018), about 20% of the total for Falkirk council area.

== Description ==
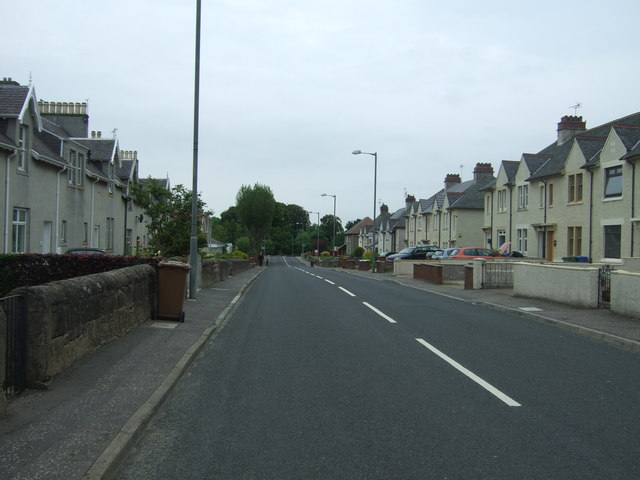
Newlands Road, Brightons

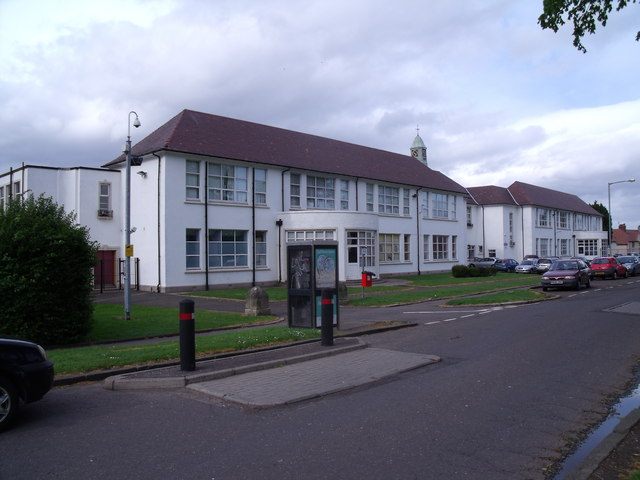
Westquarter Primary School

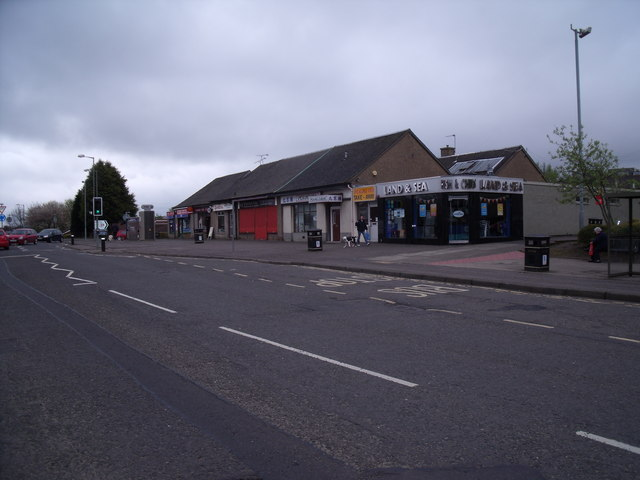
Shops on Polmont Main Street

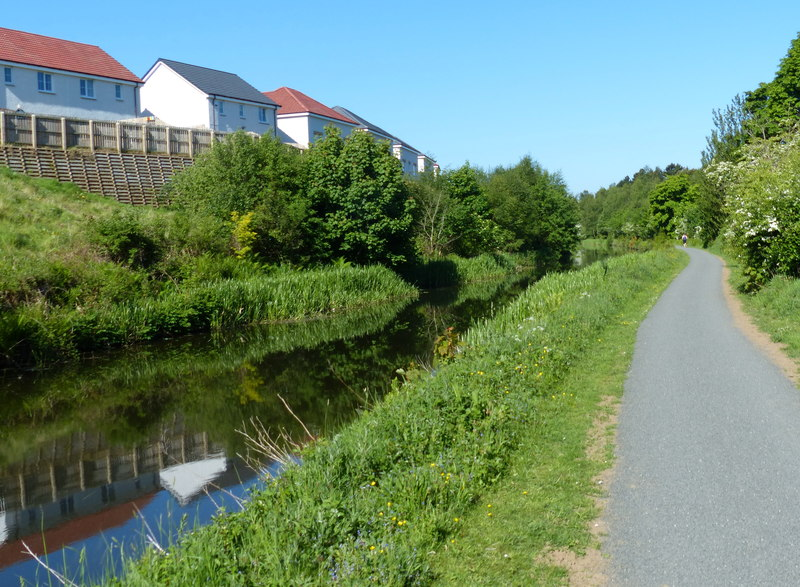
New houses at the Union Canal at Reddingmuirhead, built on former industrial land

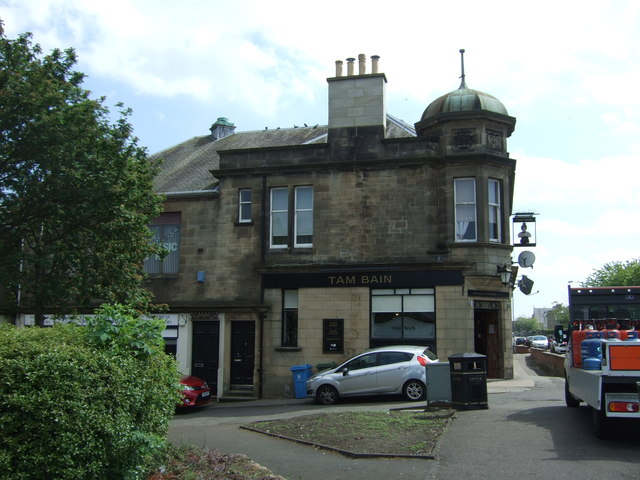
'Tam Bain' public house, Laurieston

Covering an area of high ground within 5 miles (8.0 km) to the south and east of the county town Falkirk and south of Grangemouth, its core comprises a number of small villages including mining and quarrying communities, which have each expanded to form a near-contiguous acentric suburban environment. Historically within Stirlingshire, most of the Braes villages fell under Grangemouth parish, while Laurieston was part of Falkirk parish and the south-east including Maddiston was in Muiravonside parish. The largest village, with the majority of amenities such as health centre and library, is Polmont, but this is not at the geographical centre of the agglomeration and is itself spread over a wide territory, having grown in several places in different eras. The centre could be argued to be west of Polmont at the site of the Meadowbank Colliery and Brickworks, nominally in Redding; due to its industrial history, it is one of the undeveloped parcels of land in the area.

In the 21st century, speculative housebuilding (including on brownfield sites such as the Nobel explosives works), has continued to fill most of the gaps between the settlements, owing to the location falling roughly midway between Glasgow and Edinburgh with links to both cities via the railway network (at Polmont, which falls on the boundary with Brightons) and motorways (M9) as well as employment locally at Falkirk and Grangemouth, which has been highlighted in marketing by developers.

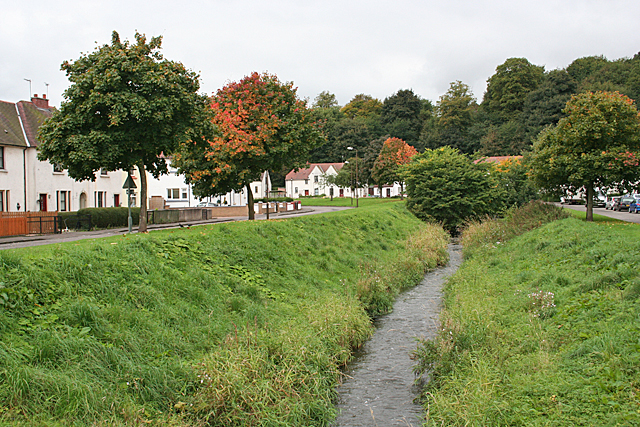
Westquarter Burn

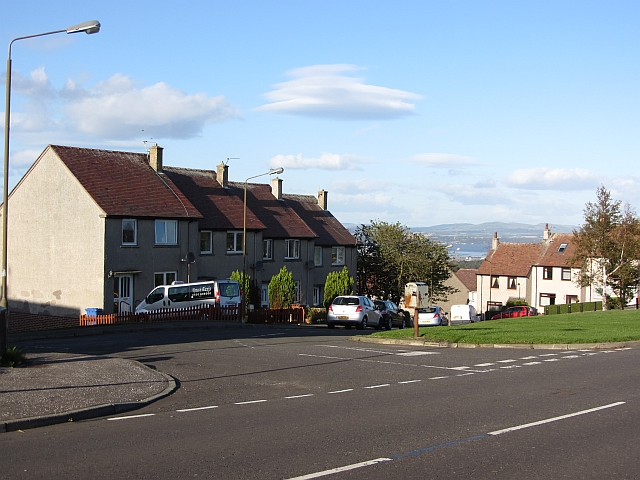
Maddiston

The area returns six representatives to Falkirk Council, three each representing the Lower Braes and Upper Braes wards, divided by the Union Canal which runs east–west through the territory; both wards (particularly Upper Braes) also include outlying rural villages such as Shieldhill, Slamannan and Whitecross in addition to the cluster of villages closer to Falkirk. In wider political contexts, as of 2019 the Braes falls wholly within the Falkirk East constituency at Holyrood, but at Westminster is divided between Linlithgow and East Falkirk and Falkirk.

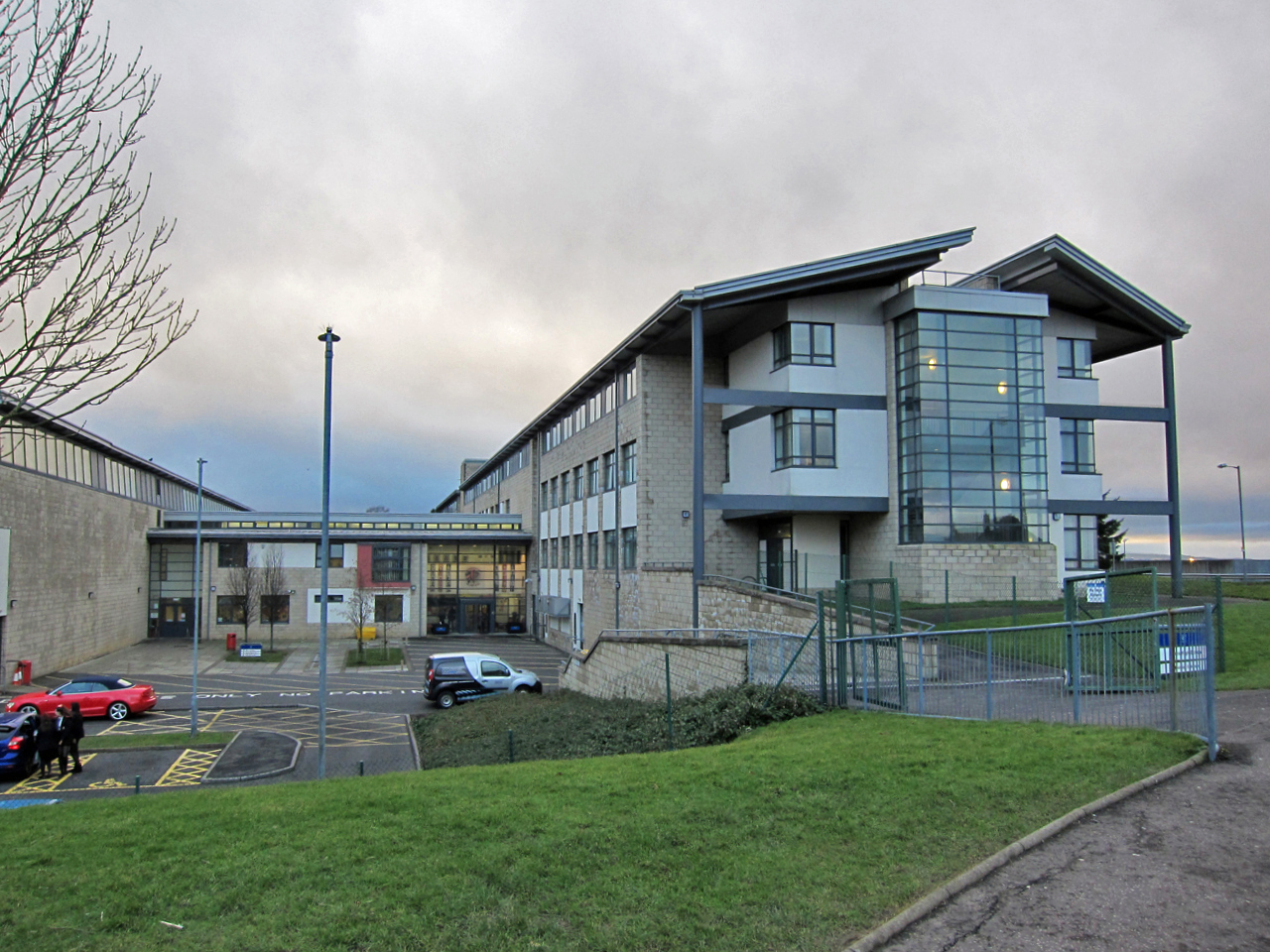
Braes High School

The local secondary school, with approximately 1,000 pupils and six feeder primaries across the Upper Braes, is Braes High School, located in Reddingmuirhead (adjacent to HMYOI Polmont). However, in the Lower Braes the eponymous primary schools in Laurieston, Westquarter and Whitecross, plus St Margaret's Primary in Polmont, are affiliated to Graeme High School in east Falkirk.

Muiravonside Country Park between Maddiston and Whitecross (featuring the Avon Aqueduct) is also within the area. The River Avon flows through the park - it denotes the eastern and southern boundaries of the Braes territory.

== List of localities ==
Displaying 2011 census figures.

=== Villages in conurbation ===
Total 22,197

- Brightons 4,461
- Laurieston 2,633
- Maddiston 3,099
- Polmont 5,322
- Redding 2,276
- Reddingmuirhead 1,556
- Rumford 884
- Wallacestone 693
- Westquarter 1,193

=== Isolated villages on periphery ===
- Avonbridge 652
- Binniehill
- California 810
- Limerigg 219
- Shieldhill 2,523
- Slamannan 1,382
- Standburn 151
- Whitecross 776

== See also ==
- List of places in Falkirk council area
