= Falkirk Stadium =

Football stadium in Falkirk, Scotland

- Westfield
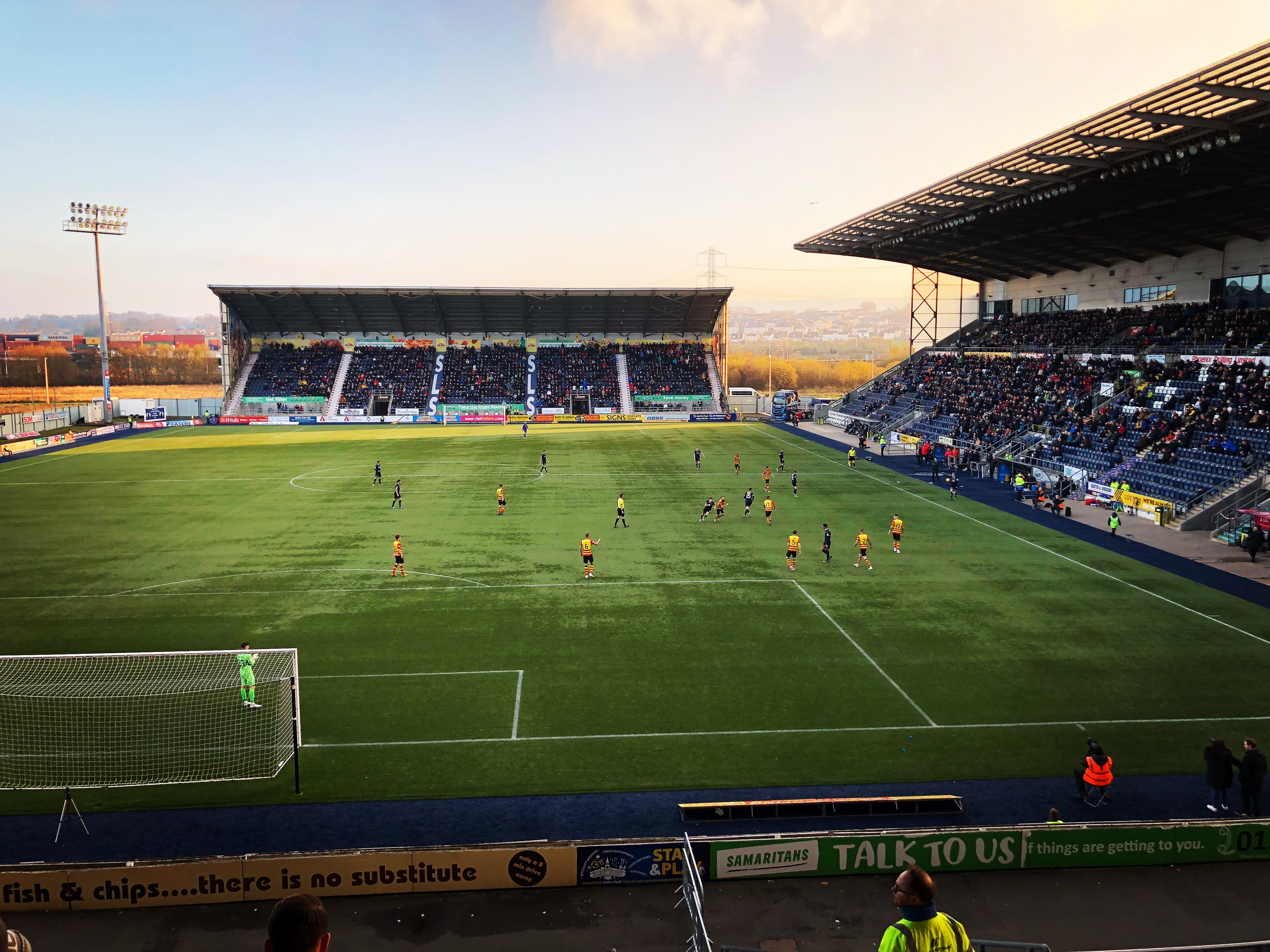
- Falkirk Stadium in 2018

- Location in Falkirk
- Full name: Falkirk Stadium
- Address: Falkirk; Scotland
- Location: Westfield; Falkirk; Scotland
- Coordinates: 56°00′19″N 3°45′10″W
- Owner: Falkirk Community Stadium Ltd
- Operator: Falkirk F.C.
- Capacity: 7,937
- Surface: synthetic pitch
- Record attendance: 7,926 (Falkirk v Dundee United, 19 May 2017)
- Field size: 109 x 79 yards

Construction
- Groundbreaking: 2003
- Opened: 2004
- Expanded: 2004–2005 (North stand); 2009 (South stand)
- Architect: Falkirk Council
- Main contractors: Mowlem (North stand and West stand); Ogilvie (south stand)

Tenants
- Falkirk F.C. (2004–present); Stirling University F.C. (2016–2018); East Stirlingshire F.C. (2018–2025); Queen's Park F.C. (2021)

Website
- www.falkirkstadium.co.uk

The Falkirk Stadium is an all-seater football stadium in Falkirk, central Scotland, which is the home ground of Scottish Premiership club Falkirk. The stadium has a capacity of 7,937 and currently consists of three fully completed stands.

The stadium was opened in 2004 with the main stand completed. It became the home of Falkirk in the same year after the club ground shared Ochilview Park for the 2003–04 season whilst the stadium was being constructed. The north and south stands were built and opened in 2005 and 2009 respectively. East Stirlingshire shared the ground from 2018 to 2025.

== History ==
Work began on building the stadium in 2003 after Brockville Park, the club's town centre home since 1885, was sold and demolished.

The project of building the stadium was a partnership between Falkirk Football Club and Falkirk Council who set up the Falkirk Community Stadium Ltd which provided the funds to construct and run the stadium. Falkirk Council estimated £6.1 million would be required for the first stage of the Community Stadium build and would contribute £3.1 million initially. The sale of Brockville Park amounted to £9 million pounds for the club, of which £2.8 million went towards the build, whilst £200,000 came from sportscotland.

The first stage of the stadium was completed in time for the 2004–05 football season and Falkirk moved in after spending the previous year ground-sharing with local rivals, Stenhousemuir at their Ochilview Park home.

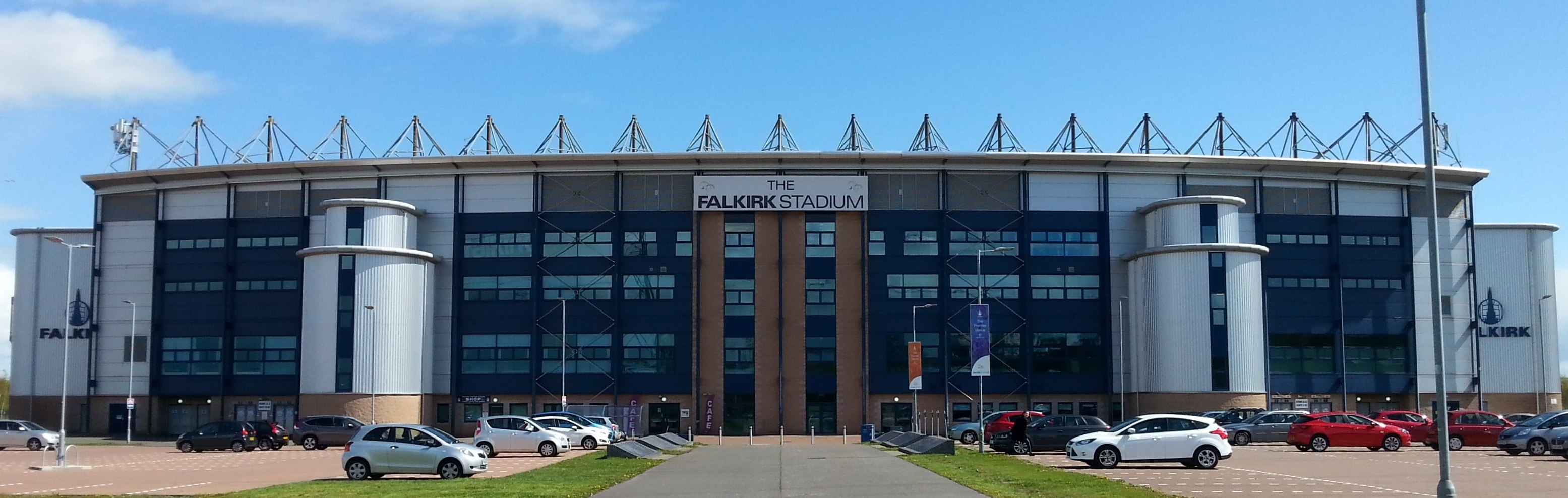
The facade of the West Stand

Falkirk's first ever game at the stadium was a friendly in July 2004 against Dundee resulting in a 2–1 defeat. A month later the first league game was hosted in the stadium with visitors Hamilton Academical drawing 1–1.

In October 2004 construction work commenced for the building of a second stand to the north of the pitch. The stand has a capacity of 2,000. After completion, the £1.58m facility would bring the stadium's capacity to over the Scottish Premier League's 6,000 seating criteria meaning Falkirk would be allowed automatic promotion from the First Division. The stand received its safety certificate in late March 2005, shortly before the SPL's deadline for a stadium which met the seating criteria. By May of the same year the north stand was fully completed.

Construction of the south stand began in December 2008 by contractors Ogilvie. A £2m pledge from Sandy Alexander, founder of Schuh and Falkirk supporter, helped fund the project. The south stand has a capacity of around 2,000 and is similar in appearance to the north stand of the stadium. It was officially opened in August 2009 in a friendly game against Royal Antwerp FC of Belgium. This brought the capacity of the stadium to around 8,000 people without the inclusion of the temporary east stand.

The joint venture that was set up between Falkirk F.C. and Falkirk Council, ended in 2009, just a few months before the opening of the south stand. The football club took full control of the facilities such as the pitch, seats, under-soil heating and floodlights, whilst the council retained most of the development rights for the site and manages and receives rent from businesses set up the stadium's main west stand.

An artificial playing surface was installed at the stadium in June 2013. In 2016 Lowland Football League side Stirling University F.C. started playing their home matches at the ground, having moved from Stirling Albion's Forthbank Stadium.

Falkirk Stadium is situated opposite the fire station

In April 2018 it was announced that East Stirlingshire would begin playing their home matches at the Falkirk Stadium from the start of the 2018–19 season. The club had previously played in the centre of Falkirk at Firs Park until 2008, before spending a decade ground-sharing with Stenhousemuir at Ochilview Park. Queen's Park also moved in during the latter part of the 2020–21 season, after their lease on Hampden Park expired.

== Structure and facilities ==
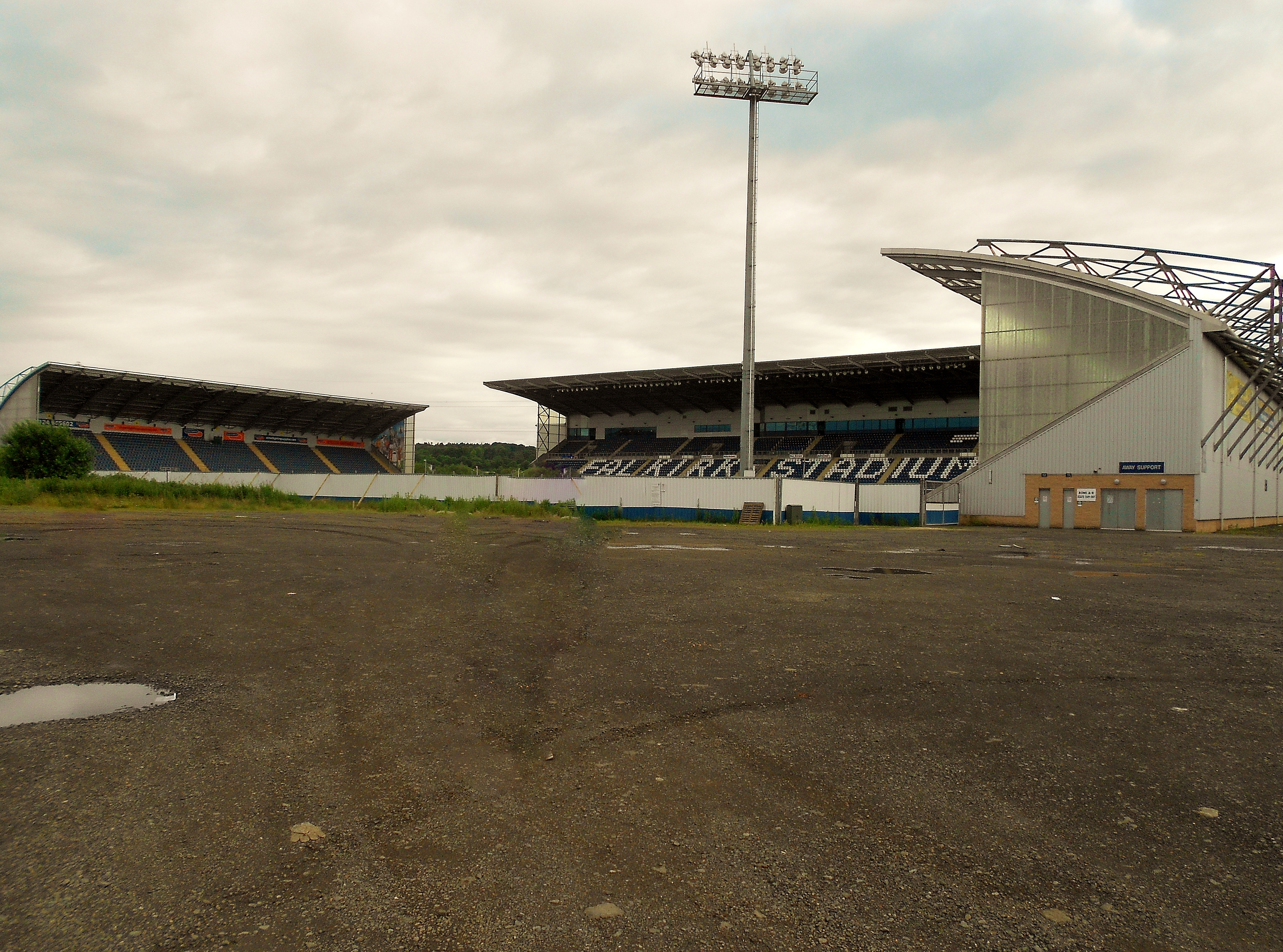
The three stands of the stadium

The Falkirk Stadium is an all-seater stadium which currently consists of three completed stands in the form of the main west stand and smaller north and south stands. Upon the stadium's construction the west stand was the first to be built, and subsequently completed in 2004. The north and south stands were completed in 2005 and 2009 respectively. The west stand has a capacity of roughly 4,200 and hosts several facilities which have ranged from a nursery to a restaurant. The south stand features a bar called the Brockville Bar. A temporary east stand has been present on several occasions.

In June 2022, the South Stand was renamed to the Kevin McAllister Stand after the football player that played for the club.

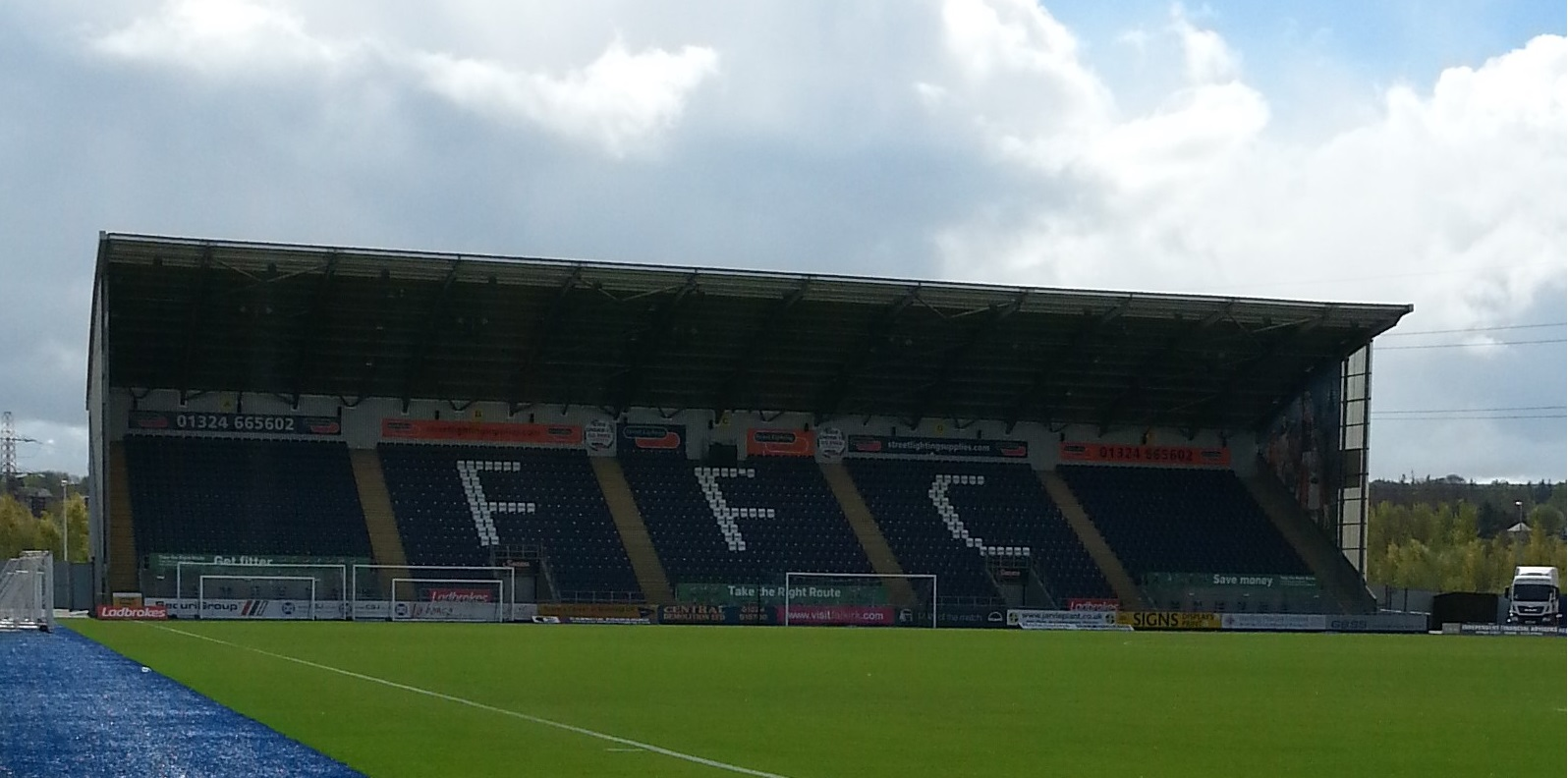
The South Stand.

== Summer concerts ==
Since 2012, Falkirk Stadium has been hosting summer concerts, achieving up to 21,000 attendees per event.

Summer concerts at Falkirk Stadium
Musician(s)	Date
Elton John	10 June 2012
Ronan Keating	21 June 2013
Midge Ure	22 June 2013
Status Quo	23 June 2013
Rod Stewart	21 June 2014
Tom Jones	1 August 2015
Madness	4 August 2017
Jess Glynne	5 August 2017
Little Mix	27 July 2018
The Killers, Blossoms	6 June 2022 ^
The Killers, Supergrass	7 June 2022 ^

^ The Killers were originally due to play at Falkirk Stadium on 28 May 2020 but this was postponed to 8 June 2021 then again to 6 June 2022 because of COVID-19.

Westlife were supposed to perform at the stadium on 27 June 2020 for their "Stadiums in the Summer Tour" but this was cancelled due to COVID-19.

== Rugby ==
As well as hosting Falkirk F.C., the stadium has also staged several youth level international rugby union matches. In 2008 the stadium was the venue chosen by the Scottish Rugby Union to host Scotland's home matches at the Six Nations Under 20s Championship which were played against England under-20s and France under-20s. Former Falkirk manager John Hughes had commented on the condition of the pitch which was previously damaged during rugby matches.

== Other uses ==
The stadium is also used on occasion by the Scotland women's national football team in World and Euro qualifying championships as well as in friendly matches. Also in relation to football, the stadium has hosted the home matches of the Scotland national under-21 football team, the first happening in November 2004 in a game against Sweden.

== Transport ==
The Falkirk Stadium is within a 30-minute walk of Falkirk Grahamston railway station which is on the main Edinburgh to Dunblane Line and Cumbernauld Line from Glasgow. During weekdays and Saturdays alternate trains between Glasgow and Cumbernauld call at Falkirk Grahamston.

Special match day bus services provided by McGill's Scotland East allow direct transport to the stadium from around the Falkirk area. The number 98 service from Brightons passes through Shieldhill, Hallglen and Laurieston before terminating at the stadium. Access from Larbert on match days is provided by the number 99 bus, which is destined for the stadium via Stenhousemuir, Carronshore and Bainsford. As well as the special match day routes, regular services are also provided by McGill's Scotland East from Falkirk bus station to Grangemouth (routes 3 and 4) and Bo'ness (route 2) which stop outside the stadium.

== See also ==
- Stadium relocations in Scottish football
