= Linlithgow and East Falkirk =

UK Parliament constituency (2005–2024)

Coordinates: 55.993°N 3.663°W

- Former county constituency for the House of Commons
- Boundary of Linlithgow and East Falkirk in Scotland
- Subdivision: Falkirk/West Lothian
- Major settlements: Armadale, Bathgate, Blackridge, Linlithgow

2005–2024
- Created from: Falkirk East and Linlithgow
- Replaced by: Bathgate and Linlithgow

Linlithgow and East Falkirk was a county constituency of the House of Commons of the Parliament of the United Kingdom, created for use in the 2005 general election. It replaced most of Falkirk East and Linlithgow.

The constituency covered the eastern portion of the Falkirk council area and the western portion of the West Lothian council area.

Further to the completion of the 2023 Periodic Review of Westminster constituencies, the seat was abolished. Subject to boundary changes, entailing the loss of the areas in Falkirk council, it was reformed as Bathgate and Linlithgow, and first contested at the 2024 general election.

== Boundaries ==
Map of boundaries 2005–2024

The constituency was formed for the 2005 United Kingdom general election. It comprised communities from West Lothian and Falkirk council areas. These were Armadale, Avonbridge, Bathgate, Blackness, Blackridge, Boghall, Bo'ness, California, Grangemouth, Greenrigg, Linlithgow, Maddiston, Philpstoun, Reddingmuirhead, Rumford, Slamannan, Torphichen, Wallacestone, Westfield, Whitburn, and Whitecross.

== Members of Parliament ==
Election	Member	Party
2005	Michael Connarty	Labour
2015	Martyn Day	SNP

== Election results ==
=== Elections of the 2010s ===
General election 2019: Linlithgow and East Falkirk
Party	Candidate	Votes	%	±%
SNP	Martyn Day	25,551	44.2	+7.9
Conservative	Charles Kennedy	14,285	24.7	−4.4
Labour	Wendy Milne	10,517	18.2	−12.9
Liberal Democrats	Sally Pattle	4,393	7.6	+4.2
Brexit Party	Marc Bozza	1,257	2.2	New
Green	Gillian Mackay	1,184	2.0	New
VPP	Mark Tunnicliff	588	1.0	New
Majority		11,266	19.5	+14.3
Turnout		57,775	66.4	+1.7
SNP hold		Swing	+2.4	

General election 2017: Linlithgow and East Falkirk
Party	Candidate	Votes	%	±%
SNP	Martyn Day	20,388	36.3	−15.7
Labour	Joan Coombes	17,469	31.1	+0.1
Conservative	Charles Kennedy	16,311	29.1	+17.1
Liberal Democrats	Sally Pattle	1,926	3.4	+1.4
Majority		2,919	5.2	−15.8
Turnout		56,094	64.7	−6.1
SNP hold		Swing	−7.9	

General election 2015: Linlithgow and East Falkirk
Party	Candidate	Votes	%	±%
SNP	Martyn Day	32,055	52.0	+26.6
Labour	Michael Connarty	19,121	31.0	−18.8
Conservative	Sandy Batho	7,384	12.0	+0.1
UKIP	Alistair Forrest	1,682	2.7	New
Liberal Democrats	Emma Farthing-Sykes	1,252	2.0	−10.8
National Front	Neil McIvor	103	0.2	New
Majority		12,934	21.0	N/A
Turnout		61,597	70.8	+7.2
SNP gain from Labour		Swing	+22.7	

General election 2010: Linlithgow and East Falkirk
Party	Candidate	Votes	%	±%
Labour	Michael Connarty	25,634	49.8	+2.1
SNP	Tam Smith	13,081	25.4	+1.9
Liberal Democrats	Stephen Glenn	6,589	12.8	−2.5
Conservative	Andrea Stephenson	6,146	11.9	+0.1
Majority		12,553	24.4	+0.2
Turnout		51,540	63.6	+3.1
Labour hold		Swing	+0.1	

=== Elections of the 2000s ===
General election 2005: Linlithgow and East Falkirk
Party	Candidate	Votes	%	±%
Labour	Michael Connarty	22,121	47.7	−4.1
SNP	Gordon Guthrie	10,919	23.5	−1.9
Liberal Democrats	Stephen Glenn	7,100	15.3	+5.2
Conservative	Michael Veitch	5,486	11.8	+2.0
Scottish Socialist	Ally Hendry	763	1.6	−0.5
Majority		11,202	24.2	−2.2
Turnout		46,389	60.5	+3.8
Labour hold		Swing	−1.1	
