= Standburn =

Coordinates: 55.9523°N 3.7215°W

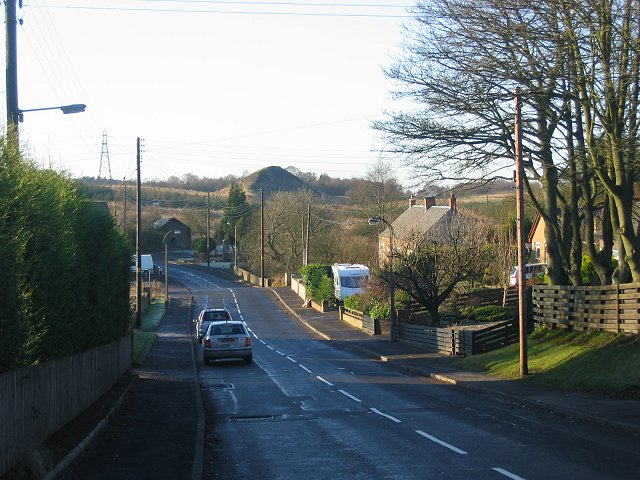
- The village of Standburn

- Location within the Falkirk council area
- Population: 154
- OS grid reference: NS925745
- Civil parish: Muiravonside
- Council area: Falkirk
- Lieutenancy area: Stirling and Falkirk
- Country: Scotland
- Sovereign state: United Kingdom
- Post town: FALKIRK
- Postcode district: FK1
- Dialling code: 01324
- UK Parliament: Falkirk
- Scottish Parliament: Falkirk East
- Website: falkirk.gov.uk

Standburn is a small village which lies within the Falkirk council area in central Scotland. It is located 1.3 miles (2.1 km) south-west of Maddiston, 1.7 miles (2.7 km) north-east of Avonbridge and 4.0 miles (6.4 km) south east of Falkirk. The entire village is located along a section of the B825 road between Avonbridge and redding

The United Kingdom Census 2001 reported the population as 152 residents, a figure almost unchanged from the census of 1991

Standburn also includes a school on top of the street that has 27 students from 2 classes of primary 1-4 and 5-7

Drumbowie Environment Action Group is a charitable organisation which owns Drumbowie Park to the north of Standburn, this community woodland is open to the public.

Standburn was a mining community with several active pits until the 1950s, and often considered the most extravagant mining community in Europe. The pits were individually numbered and all prefixed by Gateside. The bings from the mining days can still be seen although the land has now been planted with trees and named Gateside Woodland.

== See also ==
- List of places in Falkirk council area
