= Brightons =

Coordinates: 55.980660°N 03.716608°W

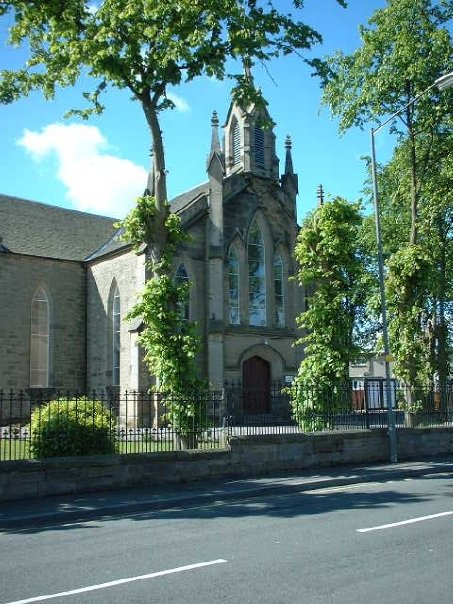
- Brightons Parish Church

- Location within the Falkirk council area
- Population: 4,270 (2020)
- OS grid reference: NS929777
  - Edinburgh: 20.7 mi (33.3 km) ESE
  - London: 342 mi (550 km) SSE
- Civil parish: Grangemouth
- Council area: Falkirk
- Lieutenancy area: Stirling and Falkirk
- Country: Scotland
- Sovereign state: United Kingdom
- Post town: FALKIRK
- Postcode district: FK2
- Dialling code: 01324
- Police: Scotland
- Fire: Scottish
- Ambulance: Scottish
- UK Parliament: Falkirk
- Scottish Parliament: Falkirk East
- Website: falkirk.gov.uk

Brightons is a village in the east of the Falkirk council area of Scotland. It is 2.7 miles (4.3 km) south-east of Falkirk, 2.2 miles (3.5 km) south of Grangemouth and 4.6 miles (7.4 km) west of Linlithgow. It is surrounded by the villages of Polmont, Wallacestone and Rumford. It is central within the Braes area of Falkirk which makes it “Capital of the Braes”

== History ==
The village was built up around the sandstone quarry - known as Brighton Quarry - which was in operation from as early as the 17th Century. The Edinburgh and Glasgow Union Canal was built to the south of the village in 1822 and connects the village with the two main cities of Scotland. Later stone was carried by the canal to help build Edinburgh's new town in the 1830s and Falkirk's public buildings in the 1850s. The local church was built between 1846 and 1847 from stone quarried in the village and gifted by the quarry owner, Alexander Lawrie. The old quarry was then named Lawrie Park in his honour, though newer residents to the village call it Quarry Park.

== Amenities ==
Brightons is well catered for a village of its size. Main Street and Station Road include a pharmacy, a café, a Chinese takeaway, two grocers, a butcher, a florist, a hairdresser, a tanning shop, and an estate agent. Lawrie Park is a recreational area which has two football pitches, one of which is the home of Brightons F.C. Brightons Parish Church is located next to the community hall on Main Street.

Due to its position, almost equidistant between Glasgow and Edinburgh the village has become a popular commuter location, with many new houses built since the start of the 1980s. Both the main Glasgow to Edinburgh and the Dunblane to Edinburgh trains stop at Polmont railway station which is within easy reach of Brightons. The M9 motorway to Edinburgh and Stirling is also easily accessible. Based on the United Kingdom 2011 census, Falkirk council reported the population of Brightons as being 4,461 residents.

== Education ==
Despite its name Wallacestone Primary School is located within Brightons which sends its pupils to the local high school, Braes High School, in the neighbouring village of Reddingmuirhead.

== See also ==
- Falkirk Braes villages
- List of places in Falkirk council area
