= California, Falkirk =

Village in Falkirk, Scotland

Coordinates: 55.9676°N 3.7545°W

California
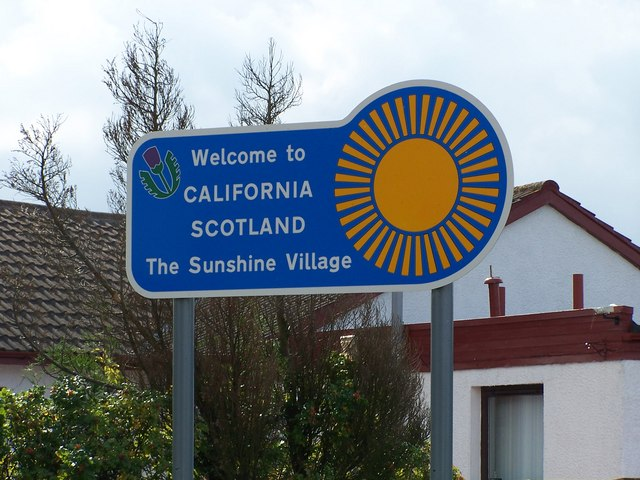
- Sign entering California

- Location within the Falkirk council area
- Population: 780 (2020)
- OS grid reference: NS905763
- Civil parish: Polmont; Muiravonside
- Council area: Falkirk
- Lieutenancy area: Stirling and Falkirk
- Country: Scotland
- Sovereign state: United Kingdom
- Post town: FALKIRK
- Postcode district: FK1
- Dialling code: 01324
- Police: Scotland
- Fire: Scottish
- Ambulance: Scottish
- UK Parliament: Falkirk
- Scottish Parliament: Falkirk East

California is a former pit village in the Falkirk council area of Scotland. It lies between Shieldhill and Avonbridge on the uplands which form the southern edge of the council area.

The population recorded in the United Kingdom 2001 census was 702, down from 747 in 1991.

== Origin of the name ==
Crown Office precognitions indicate that ‘California Row’ existed by 1860. The origin of the name California is unclear. Local tradition suggests that 'black gold' was discovered in Muiravonside at the time of the California Gold Rush of 1848–1855. While a popular myth, it does not hold up to historical scrutiny. There is a long history of coal mining in the area, and in 1832 coal from nearby Blackbraes was already being sold and marketed as 'Blackbraes Diamond'). The emergence of the settlement may be contemporaneous with the Gold Rush, however, as reflected in the following housing report of 1911, which claimed "The village of California, also in South East Stirlingshire, was built in 1849, and no doubt took its name from the region of the gold boom at that time, just as a modern colliery in the same part of the county was christened Klondyke by the miners – and I have heard two or three houses attached to it go by the name of Dawson City."

== History ==
=== Nineteenth century ===
California grew on the common muir of Whitesiderigg between Gardrum Burn and Redding Muir. Throughout the 18th century the area was grazing land for cattle coming from the south on the way to the Falkirk Tryst. The settlement emerged in the 19th century as a result of intensive coal mining. Colliers had been settling on Whitesiderig Muir throughout the early nineteenth century on land claimed by the Duke of Hamilton. Surrounded as it was by collieries at Blackbraes, Gardrum, Shieldhill and Redding, the settlement's location was determined by its proximity to the collieries of the area. By 1860 California Row had come into existence and was owned by James Nimmo & Company, owners of the nearby Blackbraes Colliery. Investment by the Duke of Hamilton and the Carron Company in coal mining at Gardrum and Redding saw an influx of population in response to the growth of employment opportunities within the mining industry.

In this period California was bisected by the Duke of Hamilton's Mineral Railway which was built to move coal from the number 16 Gardrum Pit to the Union Canal, the main colliery complex at Redding and the Edinburgh and Glasgow Railway. The line ran through California, along present day Princes Street past California Row, then down Queen's Drive and on to the Redding Muir. In 1847 the Edinburgh and Glasgow Railway built the Shieldhill Branch which was subsequently acquired by the North British Railway. This became the Gardrum Branch and later, the Blackbraes Branch. In 1871 the NBR completed the link to Gardrum Moss and the private line of the Duke of Hamilton, thereby giving California a freight link to Edinburgh and Glasgow by way of the Slamannan Junction Railway at Manuel. The Blackbraes Branch was later acquired by the London North Eastern Railway in the Grouping of 1923.

=== Twentieth century ===
In 1918, accounts of living conditions in California were presented by the Stirling Miners' Union to the Royal Commission on Housing which was critical of housing in East Stirlingshire pit villages. Among their objections to the conditions in California were that there were 'No washhouses, no coal-houses; there are six dry-closets and one street well for twenty-four families'. The village ash-pits were cleaned monthly and the mineral railway, which ran through the village, was also used as a drain and sewer. Nonetheless, this was seen as an improvement on the previous situation, where the inhabitants resorted to fields and hedgerows and the village was marked by middens.

The conditions described in these reports contributed to the provision of new housing in the 1930s. By 1931, Stirling County Council were in the process of providing 12 three-apartment houses. Mining remained the main source of employment. Nonetheless, working conditions in the nearby collieries were still hazardous. For example, Andrew Anderson and his son William, of California, were killed in the Redding Pit Disaster of 1923. Ironically, the source of the water which flooded the pit was traced to California and the diversion of a small burn there.

Employment was also provided at a series of peat extraction works at the nearby Gardum Moss. The Peat Moss Litter works at Gardrum, however, were demolished by the 1930s. However, in the 1950s this site was used as an experimental peat drying facility which was operated by a professor of Glasgow University. Until the 1990s the site was worked by William Sinclair Horticulture.

=== Present day ===
Currently, California is mainly residential and contains California Primary School which was built in 1914 for miners' children at the request of Grangemouth Parish School Board and a newsagent. The village is represented by the Braes Area Forum. In recent years Falkirk Council has tried to rebrand California as 'The Sunshine Village' with the placing of a sign in the centre of the village to that effect.

== Sport ==
Quoits and football have been particularly popular in California. The 1920s was remarkable for California Celtic FC, winners of the Polmont and District Amateur Cup in season 1919–1920 and who took the unusual step of changing their name to California Rangers after financial difficulties forced them to reapply to the Polmont and District Amateur League under a new name. A team was also set up in 1961. California is currently represented in the Stirling and District Amateur Football League by California Star FC and California FC.

== See also ==
- Falkirk Braes villages
