= Wallacestone =

Coordinates: 55.974471°N 3.734579°W

Wallacestone: Scottish Gaelic: Clach Uallais
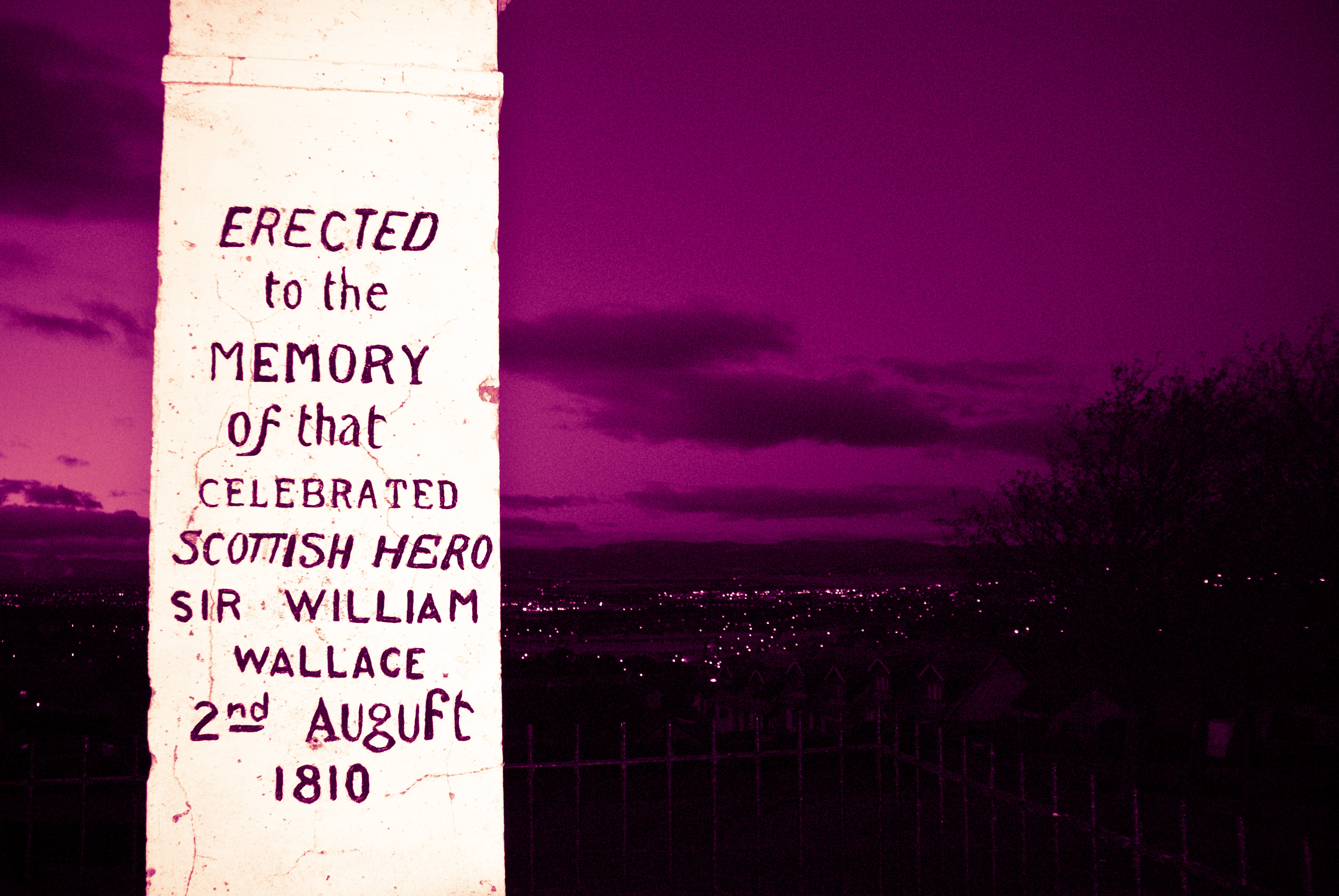
- Memorial to William Wallace in Wallacestone

- Location within the Falkirk council area
- Population: 650 (2020)
  - Edinburgh: 21.2 mi (34.1 km) ESE
  - London: 343 mi (552 km) SSE
- Civil parish: Grangemouth
- Council area: Falkirk
- Lieutenancy area: Stirling and Falkirk
- Country: Scotland
- Sovereign state: United Kingdom
- Post town: FALKIRK
- Postcode district: FK2
- Dialling code: 01324
- Police: Scotland
- Fire: Scottish
- Ambulance: Scottish
- UK Parliament: Falkirk
- Scottish Parliament: Falkirk East
- Website: falkirk.gov.uk

Wallacestone is a village in the area of Falkirk, central Scotland. It lies 1.5 miles (2.4 km) south-west of Polmont, 2.5 miles (4.0 km) south-east of Falkirk and 1.0 mile (1.6 km) north-east of California.

The population of Wallacestone was recorded as 746 residents at the time of the 2001 census.

== History ==
Nearby Falkirk was the site of William Wallace's last battle during the war of independence against the invading English. On 22 July 1298 Wallace faced the English army, commanded by Edward I. The Scots were defeated and many thousands were killed. The exact site of the battle has yet to be discovered and still generates much debate. However, at Wallacestone is situated a stone pillar which replaced a much older stone to mark the place where Wallace stood to watch the approach of the English army from Linlithgow and command his army at the subsequent battle.

The viewpoint of Wallace looks across the Forth Valley, including the Forth Bridges to the east, the carse of Falkirk, Wallace Monument at Stirling and Stirling Castle to the north. It also includes as far away as the start of the Highlands at Ben Lomond and the Trossachs to the west.

== See also ==
- Falkirk Braes villages
- List of places in Falkirk council area
