= Laurieston, Falkirk =

Coordinates: 55.9986°N 03.7524°W

Laurieston: Scottish Gaelic: Baile Labhrainn
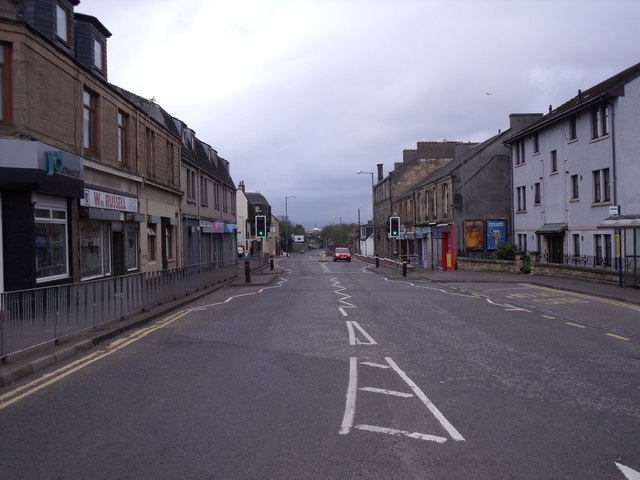
- Looking west towards Falkirk along the A803 through Laurieston

- Location within the Falkirk council area
- Population: 2,650 (2020)
- OS grid reference: NS910794
  - Edinburgh: 21.8 mi (35.1 km) E
  - London: 344 mi (554 km) SSE
- Civil parish: Falkirk
- Council area: Falkirk
- Lieutenancy area: Stirling and Falkirk
- Country: Scotland
- Sovereign state: United Kingdom
- Post town: FALKIRK
- Postcode district: FK2
- Dialling code: 01324
- Police: Scotland
- Fire: Scottish
- Ambulance: Scottish
- UK Parliament: Falkirk
- Scottish Parliament: Falkirk East
- Website: falkirk.gov.uk

Laurieston is a village in the Falkirk council area in Central Scotland. It is 1.5 miles (2.4 km) east of Falkirk, 1.6 miles (2.6 km) south-west of Grangemouth and 1.6 miles (2.6 km) west of Polmont.

Laurieston is located on the A803 road between Falkirk and Polmont. At the time of the 2001 census, Laurieston had a population of 2,752 residents, down from 3,000 in 1991 and 3,300 in 1971.

The course of the Antonine Wall runs through the village with the largest fort on the wall located at Mumrills.

== History ==
Laurieston was a planned village. Before Francis Napier, 6th Lord Napier, started feuing the lands of Langton in 1756, there was just a scatter of cottages and farmhouses. This new settlement was called New Merchiston after the Napier family seat. It was then renamed Lawrencetown in 1765 after Napier sold the project to Sir Lawrence Dundas, becoming known as Laurieston within a few years. Situated on the main street is Hawthorn Cottage, a nineteenth-century stone dwelling that was once owned by Alfred Nobel, inventor of dynamite and creator of the Nobel Prizes after his death. Nobel lived there while managing an explosives factory near the nearby villages of Redding and Westquarter.

Mumrills Fort, the largest Roman Fort on the Antonine Wall, was situated to the east while the path of the Antonine Wall runs through the village. The course of the wall runs roughly along Grahamsdyke Street, which is named after the wall's medieval name "Gryme's Dyke".

== Notable people ==
- Margaret Cowie Crowe (1882–1973), nurse who served in Serbia and Russia during World War I.
- John McAleese (1949–2011), British Army soldier, spent his childhood and youth in Laurieston.
- Captain James Fitz Morris MC (1879 - 1918), Royal Air Force flying ace, accredited with 14 aerial victories. Attended Laurieston Public School. Morris died in a flying accident in Cincinnati, Ohio on 14 August 1918.
- James Reilly MM (1893 - 1918), member of The Royal Scots, Lance Corporal Reilly was recommended for his bravery on three occasions. Brought up in James Street, Laurieston, Reilly was killed in France. He is honoured on the memorial at Arras to the missing in France.
- Cheryl Forbes, 1974, international opera singer born and brought up in Laurieston. She has twice been honoured by her home town of Falkirk for services to music.
- Graham Lister, born approx. 1957 in Laurieston, educated at Graeme High School and The Royal Scottish Academy of Music and Drama. A renowned Opera singer and talented musician, Lister currently lives in Barcelona.

== See also ==
- Falkirk Braes villages
- List of places in Falkirk council area
