= Shieldhill, Falkirk =

Coordinates: 55.972309°N 03.765049°W

Shieldhill
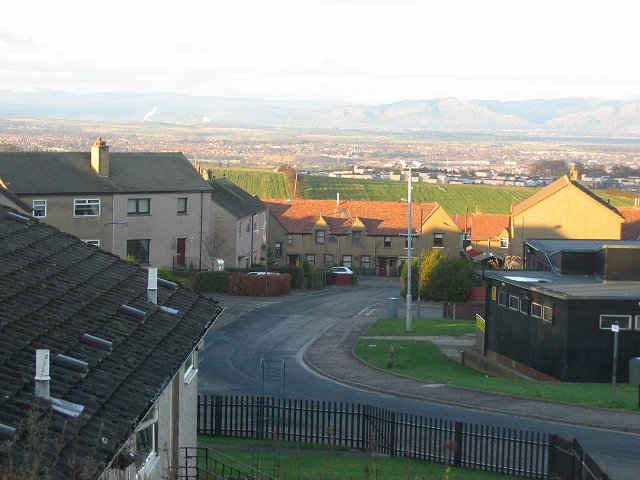
- in the west of the village looking over the Forth Valley

- Location within the Falkirk council area
- Area: 0.24 sq mi (0.62 km^{2})
- Population: 2,380 (2020)
  - Density: 9,917/sq mi (3,829/km^{2})
- OS grid reference: NS899769
  - Edinburgh: 22.4 mi (36.0 km) ESE
  - London: 343 mi (552 km) SSE
- Civil parish: Grangemouth
- Council area: Falkirk
- Lieutenancy area: Stirling and Falkirk
- Country: Scotland
- Sovereign state: United Kingdom
- Post town: Falkirk
- Postcode district: FK1
- Dialling code: 01324
- Police: Scotland
- Fire: Scottish
- Ambulance: Scottish
- UK Parliament: Falkirk
- Scottish Parliament: Falkirk East
- Website: falkirk.gov.uk

Shieldhill is a village within the Falkirk council area in Central Scotland. The village is two miles (three kilometres) southeast of Falkirk, 2 1/2 miles (4 kilometres) southwest of Polmont and 1/2 mile (800 metres) north of California.

Shieldhill is divided into a few main parts: " The California end" and the old " scheme end " to the west, and the newer Bovis and the original old miners rows which have existed in some way for approximately 150 years. The main road through Shieldhill is the B8028 road between California and Glen Village and the B810 road from Reddingmuirhead. At the time of the 2001 census, Shieldhill had a population of 2,656 residents.

== Amenities ==
There are two corner shops, one with Post Office facilities. Blackbraes and Shieldhill Parish Church is in Shieldhill. Shieldhill Gospel Hall is another religious meeting place in the village.

Shieldhill has one primary school, Shieldhill Primary School.

== Governance ==
The village forms part of the Falkirk constituency for UK general elections and part of the Falkirk East constituency in Scottish Parliament elections.

== See also ==
- Falkirk Braes villages
- List of places in Falkirk council area
