= Graeme High School =

Scottish secondary educational institution

Location
- Falkirk; Scotland; 55.998°N 3.764°W

Information
- Type: Secondary
- Motto: Fain To Serve
- Established: 1937 (Formerly known as Falkirk Technical School)
- Headteacher: Kristy Rennie
- Teaching staff: 90
- Enrollment: 1,200
- Colours: Blue (Seniors), Yellow/Black (Juniors)
- Website: graemehigh.com

Graeme High School is a non-denominational public secondary school located in Falkirk, Scotland. The school is operated by Falkirk Council on behalf of the Education Department of the Scottish Government. The catchment area, from which the school's pupil population is drawn, comprises Hallglen, Laurieston, St. Margaret's, Victoria and Westquarter primary schools, located in the east of Falkirk itself and in the nearby Lower Braes villages.

== Admissions ==
The school roll contains approximately 1200 pupils, and there are almost 90 teachers on staff.

== History ==
The school is named after Sir John de Graham, a leader in the army of William Wallace.

In 1998, it was decided by the Scottish Executive that five local schools, including Graeme High School, would be rebuilt. Graeme High was rebuilt on the playing fields east of the original school. In August 2000 the replacement school was opened by the then First Minister Donald Dewar. At the time the Public Private Partnership scheme (PFI) project that included the rebuilding of Graeme High was one of the largest in the UK.

In 2012, the school was selected as the Falkirk base for the Scottish Football Association's Performance Schools, a system devised to support the development of the best young talented footballers across the country (there are seven such schools across Scotland). As of 2018, the dedicated coach for the young players at Graeme High is Ian Ross.

== Traditions ==
There are four houses – Lockhart (whose colour is Red), Morrison (whose colour is Yellow), Steele (whose colour is Purple) and Thomson (whose colour is Blue) – which are named after the first four rectors of the school.

== Notable former pupils ==
- Adam Crozier, chief executive of ITV plc, and former chief executive of Royal Mail and The Football Association
- Graham Gardner, cricketer
- Sam Kerr, footballer
- Malcolm Middleton, musician
- James Redmond, broadcaster
- Tam Scobbie, footballer
- Craig Sibbald, footballer
- Ruth Connell, actress
- Gary Gillespie, footballer
- Prof Bill Buchanan, academic
