= Avondale Landfill =

Landfill site in Falkirk, Scotland

Coordinates: 55°59′25″N 3°40′43″W

Avondale Environmental Ltd
- Company type: Private limited company
- Headquarters: Polmont, Scotland
- Products: Renewable Energy
- Website: www.avondalelandfill.co.uk

Avondale Environmental, better known as Avondale Landfill, is a major Scottish landfill located in Polmont, off junction 4 of the M9 motorway. Avondale takes large volumes of waste from the Forth Valley and some from West Lothian. Avondale has the ability to accept Non-Hazardous, Stable Non-Reactive Hazardous waste including asbestos/gypsum and compliant hazardous wastes. This is the first and currently only landfill with the ability to accept hazardous waste to landfill in Scotland under the Landfill Directive.

The Avondale Landfill incorporates landfill gas recovery facilities which are used to generate renewable electricity on site which is supplied into the national grid.

A Materials Recovery Facility opened in February 2012, with the intention of diverting the majority of waste from landfill, but was closed in 2013.

The company also operates a contaminated soil treatment centre at Kinneil Kerse near Grangemouth/Bo'ness.
