= Graham Gardner (cricketer) =

Scottish cricketer (born 1966)

Personal information
- Full name: Graham Edward Gardner
- Born: 1 June 1966 (age 60); Brighton, Sussex, England
- Batting: Right-handed
- Bowling: Right-arm medium

Domestic team information
- Years: Team
- 1996: Scotland

Career statistics
Competition	First-class
Matches	1
Runs scored	2
Batting average	–
100s/50s	–/–
Top score	2*
Balls bowled	96
Wickets	2
Bowling average	37.00
5 wickets in innings	–
10 wickets in match	–
Best bowling	1/36
Catches/stumpings	–/–
- Source: Cricinfo, 26 July 2022

Graham Edward Gardner (born 1 June 1966) is an English-born Scottish former first-class cricketer.

Gardner was born in June 1966 at Brighton. Moving to Scotland as a child, he was educated at Graeme High School in Falkirk and Larbert High School at Larbert. A club cricketer for Stenhousemuir Cricket Club, Gardner made a single appearance for Scotland in first-class cricket against Ireland at Linlithgow in 1996. Batting once in the match from the middle order, he scored an unbeaten 2 runs in the Scottish second innings. With his medium pace bowling, he took a wicket apiece in both Irish innings', dismissing Kyle McCallan in their first innings and Andrew Patterson in their second. In 2005, Gardner featured in a minor match between Clackmannan and Warwickshire as part of Dougie Brown's benefit year, with Gardner being instrumental in a surprise 8 wicket victory for Clackmannan.
