= HMYOI Polmont =

Young offenders institution in Scotland

HM YOI Polmont
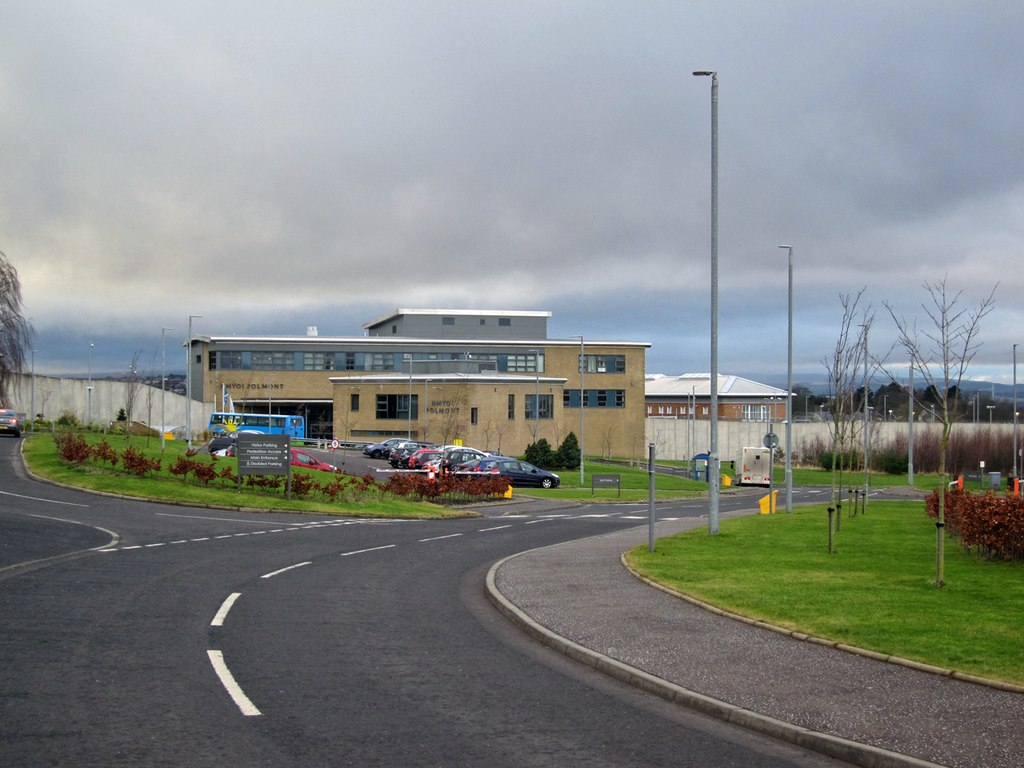
- Interactive map of HM YOI Polmont
- Location: Polmont, Falkirk; 55°59′1″N 3°43′50″W
- Status: Operational
- Security class: Young Offenders Institution
- Capacity: 712
- Managed by: Scottish Prison Service
- Governor: Tony Martin

His Majesty's Young Offenders Institution Polmont is the largest young offender's institution in Scotland. It is located in the village of Reddingmuirhead.

HMP Polmont first opened as a borstal in 1911 in the buildings of the former Blairlodge Academy. The Academy had been forced to close in 1908 due to financial difficulties and a subsequent outbreak of an infectious disease, and the Prison Commissioners bought the site in 1911.

As of January 2024, HMP Polmont is no longer exclusively a young offenders institution; short-term, low-supervision adult males can now be transferred there and housed within the facility.

Notable inmates have included murderer Luke Mitchell, Chris Cunningham, star of BBC Scotland's The Scheme, and Aaron Campbell, convicted of carrying out one instance of child abduction, rape and murder.

== Incidents ==
In April 2004, a 17-year-old Polmont inmate serving a life sentence for murder was mistakenly released from Hamilton Sheriff Court after being transferred by private prisoner escort contractor Reliance. He had impersonated another teenager who had been granted bail and handed himself in after 17 days on the run, following a nationwide manhunt and a political controversy over the privatisation of prisoner escort services.

== Film and TV ==
- Boys Behind Bars (2007), documentary set in HM YOI Polmont
