= Bo'ness Academy =

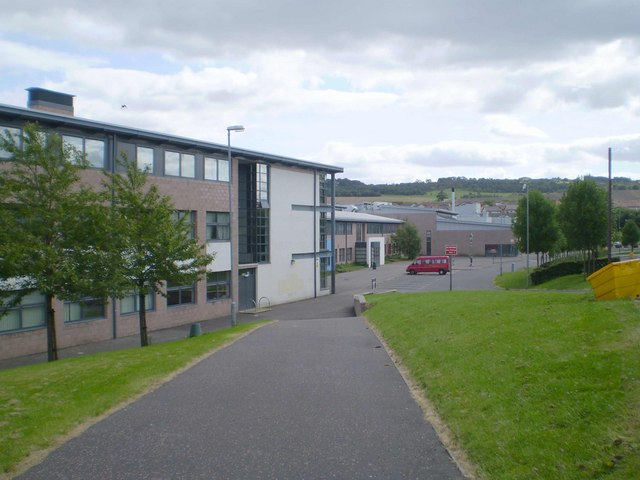
- Academy viewed from the north

Location
- Gauze Road; Bo'ness, Falkirk, EH51 9AS; Scotland
- Coordinates: 56.0098°N 3.5986°W

Information
- Other name: BA
- Type: Secondary school
- Motto: Be The Best You Can Be
- Local authority: Falkirk Council
- Head teacher: Catriona Reid
- Gender: Mixed
- Age range: 12–18
- Colours: Black, red, yellow
- Website: www.bonessacademy.com

Bo'ness Academy (BA) is a mixed secondary school in Bo'ness, Falkirk, Scotland. The headteacher is Catriona Reid, who was appointed in 2020.

== History ==
The first Bo'ness Academy building opened in 1931. The building had an extension added in the late 1950s, then was further extended in 1971. New school buildings opened in 2000.

On 4 December 2007, a fire started in the school's gymnasium, resulting in damage to 30% of the facility and pupils being evacuated, according to a spokesperson.

In June 2024, Falkirk Council announced plans for a £4.3 million community wing at the school, including a gymnasium with over 40 stations, a multi-purpose studio, accessible changing facilities and a reception area. The wing will also offer extended access to the school’s existing sports facilities, with a new rugby pitch being built for use by Bo'ness Rugby Club and the school's physical education programme. Construction is set to begin in August 2025, with completion expected by October 2026.

Ownership of the buildings is expected to transfer to Falkirk Council in August 2025.
