= Westquarter =

Village in central Scotland

Coordinates: 55.988°N 3.741°W

Westquarter: Scottish Gaelic: Ceathramh-an-Iar
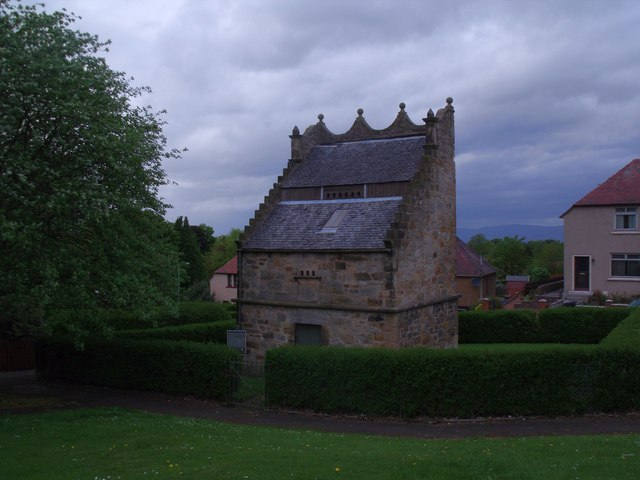
- Westquarter Dovecote, built for the long demolished Westquarter House some 150 years ago

- Location within the Falkirk council area
- Population: 1,120 (2020)
- OS grid reference: NS916786
  - Edinburgh: 21.5 mi (34.6 km) ESE
  - London: 343 mi (552 km) SSE
- Civil parish: Grangemouth
- Council area: Falkirk
- Lieutenancy area: Stirling and Falkirk
- Country: Scotland
- Sovereign state: United Kingdom
- Post town: FALKIRK
- Postcode district: FK2
- Dialling code: 01324
- Police: Scotland
- Fire: Scottish
- Ambulance: Scottish
- UK Parliament: Falkirk
- Scottish Parliament: Falkirk East

Westquarter is a village in the Falkirk council area of Scotland. The village is 1 mile (1.6 km) west of Polmont and 1.8 miles (2.9 km) south-east of the town of Falkirk.

Westquarter can be accessed from the north via the A803 road and from the south via the B805 road.

At the 2001 census the village of Westquarter was recorded as having a resident population of 1,105.

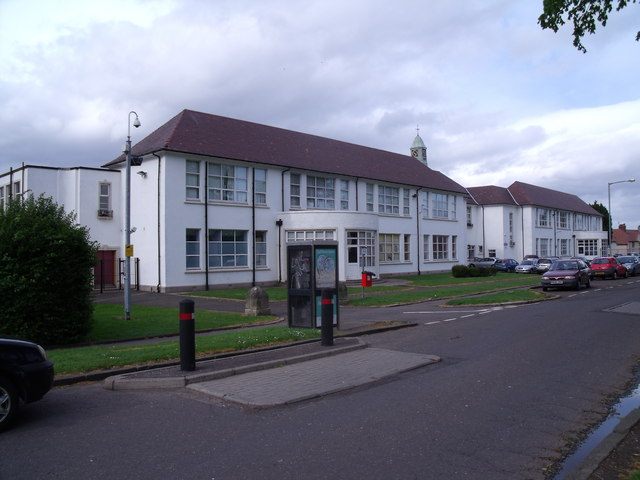
Westquarter Primary School

In 1876 George McRoberts who already manufactured detonators (for mining) at Westquarter, was joined by Alfred Nobel to build the Nobel Explosives Factory in Westquarter.

== Westquarter House ==
This mansion dated from at least 1626 and from 1701 belonged to the Livingston family. It was lost after the uprising of 1715, being confiscated from the family due to their Jacobite sympathies but was regained by Sir Alexander Livingston in 1784. His son Admiral Thomas Livingston took over the estate around 1824 and died there in 1853. His wife continued there for some years but being childless the estate passed to a distant relative, Thomas Fenton Livingstone, in 1884, who greatly enlarged and remodelled the property. It was purchased by Stirling County Council in 1934 and demolished in 1936 to create the Westquarter housing scheme.

== See also ==
- Falkirk Braes villages
