= Rumford, Falkirk =

Coordinates: 55.975050°N 3.70892°W

Rumford
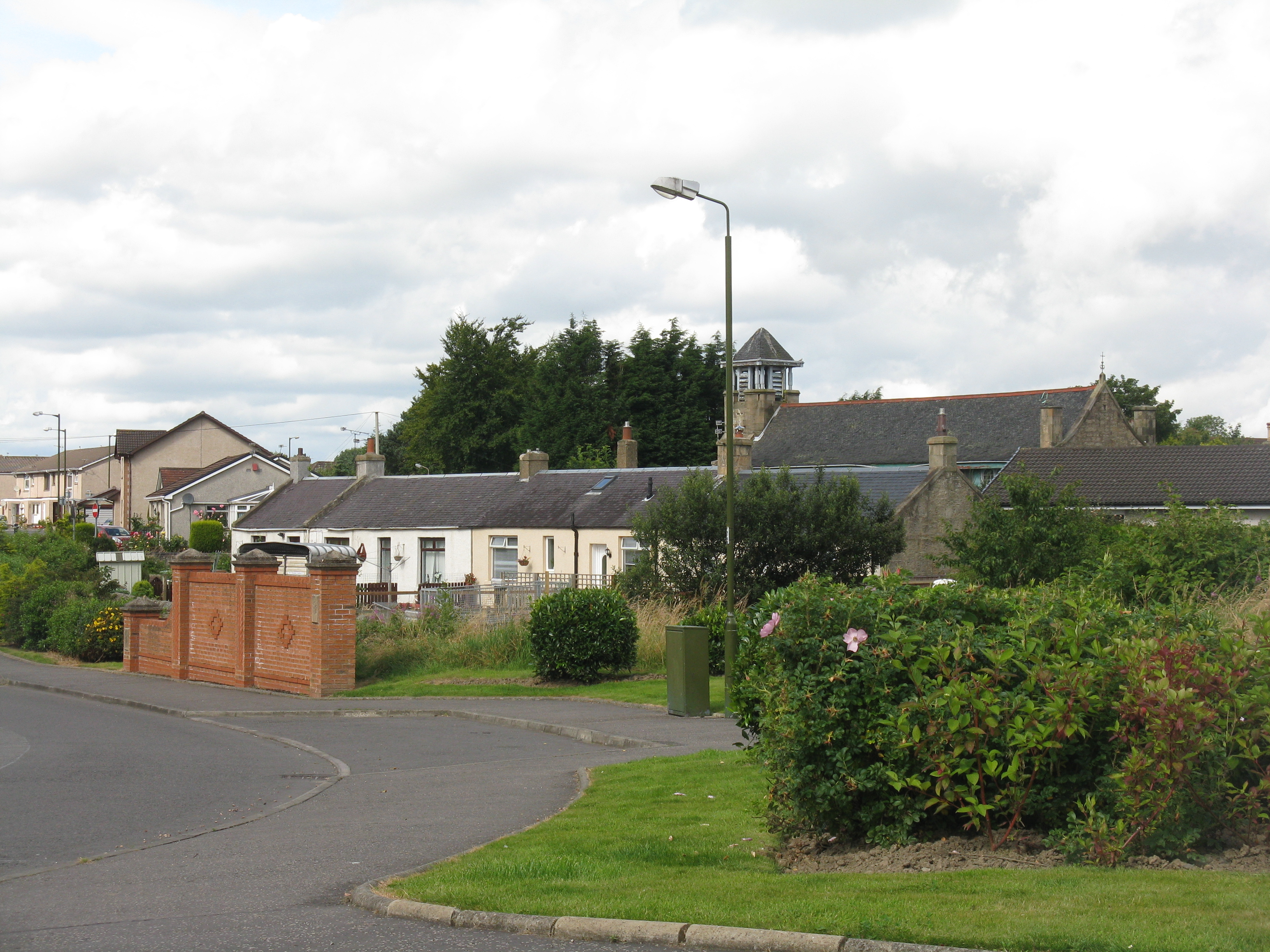
- Nicolton Road, Rumford

- Location within the Falkirk council area
- Population: 810 (2020)
- OS grid reference: NS934771
- Civil parish: Muiravonside
- Council area: Falkirk
- Lieutenancy area: Stirling and Falkirk
- Country: Scotland
- Sovereign state: United Kingdom
- Post town: FALKIRK
- Postcode district: FK2
- Dialling code: 01324
- UK Parliament: Falkirk
- Scottish Parliament: Falkirk East
- Website: falkirk.gov.uk

Rumford is a small village between Maddiston and Brightons in the Falkirk council area, of Scotland.

The village went through a great deal of expansion in the late 1990s and early 2000s, resulting in the population increasing exponentially since the 1991 census, when it was recorded as around 275 residents. In the 2001 and 2011 censuses, Falkirk Council reported the population as being 421 and 884 respectively.

== See also ==
- Falkirk Braes villages
- List of places in Falkirk council area
