= Larbert High School =

Coordinates: 56.02261°N 3.80872°W

- Stenhousemuir, Falkirk, FK5 3BL; Scotland

Information
- Type: Secondary
- Motto: Optimum Sequi (Follow the best course in all things)
- Established: 1885
- Local authority: Falkirk Council
- Acting headteacher: Jo Wilson
- Teaching staff: ~140
- Years taught: S1-S6
- Enrollment: 2057
- Colour: Blue
- Feeder schools: Kinnaird Primary; Larbert Village Primary; Stenhousemuir Primary; Carron Primary; Airth Primary; Ladeside Primary; Carronshore Primary
- Website: www.larberthigh.com

Larbert High School is a six-year, non-denominational state school in Stenhousemuir, Scotland, United Kingdom (UK). The school is run by Falkirk Council Education Services on behalf of the Scottish Government.

Currently, Larbert High are recruiting a new rector, with Jo Wilson currently acting as rector, due to the previous rector, Jon Reid's, departure to become the Director of Education at Falkirk Council.

The school was inspected by HM Inspectorate of Education in the 2016/17 session and found to be "Excellent" in the category of "Leadership of Change" and "Very Good" across all other categories. Larbert High was the first school to achieve an "Excellent" rating. At the end of 2023, 96.21% of school leavers entered into a Positive Destination, which was above the Falkirk (94.2%) and Scottish (95.9%) averages.

In the 2023/2024 academic year, the school roll was 2057 pupils with expectations of growth in future years to come and reach capacity. It is currently considered as the largest non-denominational secondary school and the second largest in Scotland. The school is secondary to 7 local primary schools, including Stenhousemuir Primary, Larbert Village Primary, Ladeside Primary, Carron Primary, Kinnaird Primary, Carronshore Primary, and Airth Primary.

== History ==
From 1886 to 1977, the school operated from its primary site on Main Street, Stenhousemuir. In November 1977, an extension to the school was opened at Carrongrange, around 500 metres from the Main Street campus.

From 1977 to 2000, the school operated on a split-site basis, and this meant that between lessons, pupils had to walk (potentially up to five times per day), between the two buildings. This was criticised in the inspection of the school in 1999.

In 1998, Falkirk Council opted to consolidate the school on the Carrongrange site, removing the need for students to transfer between different buildings. This was funded by the Private Finance Initiative. In early 2000, the school was opened on the one site at Carrongrange.

In 2005, the total running costs of the school were £5,852,498 or £3,553 per pupil.

In 2019 the school won a 'Parents as Partners in Learning' award at the Scottish Education Awards.

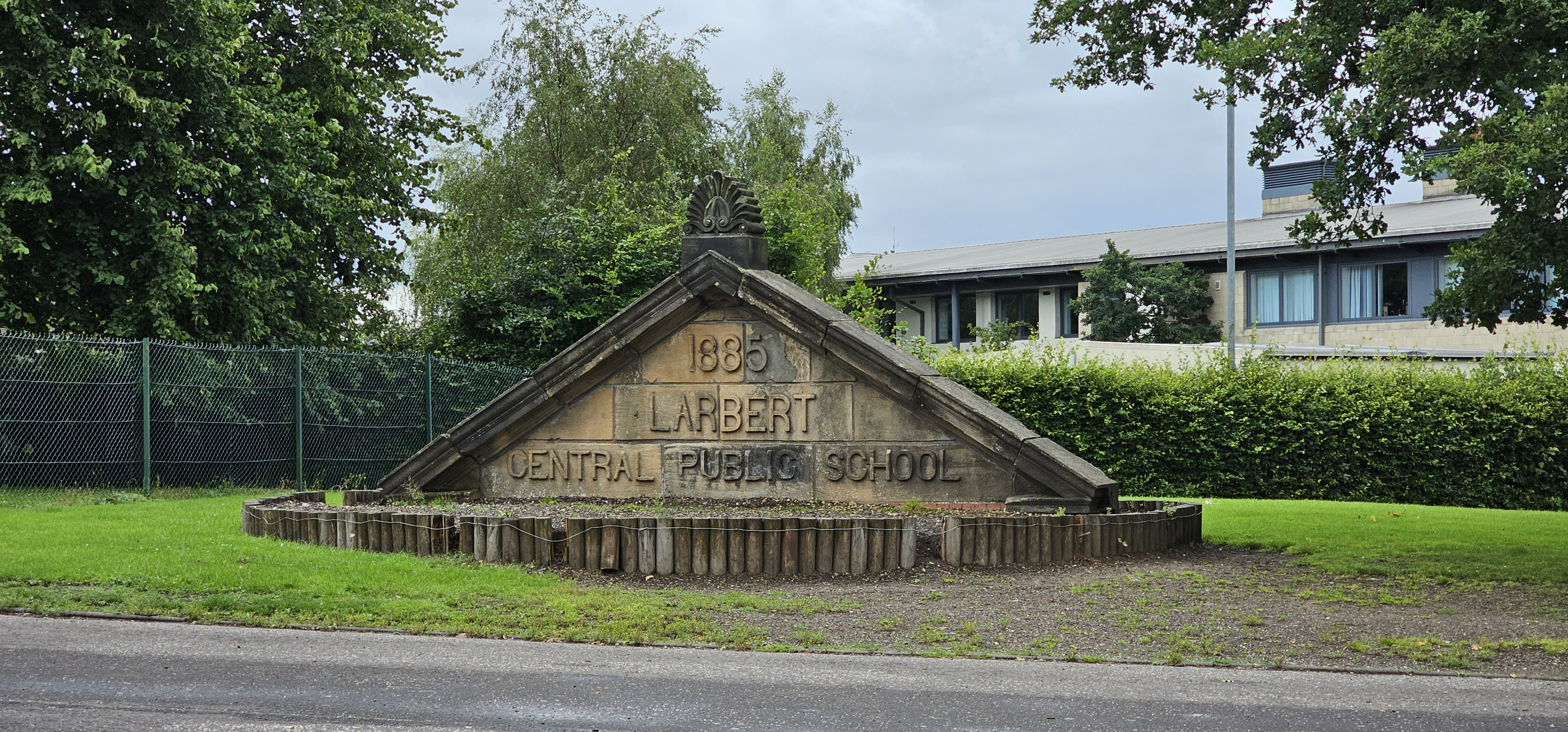
In May 2023, Falkirk Council announced that five privately built Falkirk high schools, including Larbert High, would be brought back under council control in August 2025, after data revealed that the Public Private Partnership contracts with Class 98 cost the council £11 million per year.

== Notable former pupils ==
- Graham Gardner (cricketer)
- Brian Hardie (cricketer)
- Keith Hardie (cricketer)
- Craig G. Telfer (TV Presenter)
- Leanne Ross (footballer) Leanne Ross
