= Maddiston =

Coordinates: 55.969956°N 03.697666°W

Maddiston: Scots: Maudirstoun
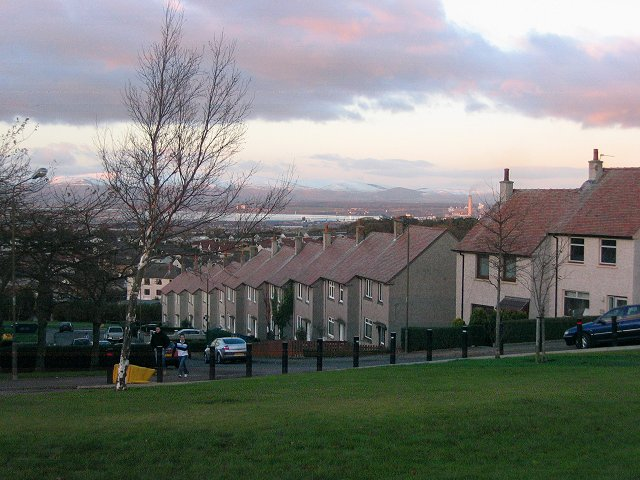
- Housing in Maddiston, overlooking the Forth Valley

- Location within the Falkirk council area
- Population: 3,910 (2020)
- OS grid reference: NS941765
  - Edinburgh: 19.8 mi (31.9 km) ESE
  - London: 343 mi (552 km) SSE
- Civil parish: Muiravonside
- Council area: Falkirk
- Lieutenancy area: Stirling and Falkirk
- Country: Scotland
- Sovereign state: United Kingdom
- Post town: FALKIRK
- Postcode district: FK2
- Dialling code: 01324
- Police: Scotland
- Fire: Scottish
- Ambulance: Scottish
- UK Parliament: Falkirk
- Scottish Parliament: Falkirk East
- Website: falkirk.gov.uk

Maddiston is a village in the Falkirk council area of Scotland. It lies 3.8 miles (6.1 km) west-southwest of Linlithgow, 1.3 miles (2.1 km) south of Polmont and 0.6 miles (1.0 km) south-east of Rumford at the south-east edge of the Falkirk urban area.

== Population ==
Based on the United Kingdom 2001 census, Falkirk council reported the population of Maddiston as being 2,952 residents, a 40% rise since 1991. The subsequent census in 2011 reported the population as 3,099, an increase of 174 residents (5.9%).

== History ==
Maddiston (historically Maudirstoun) is in the parish of Muiravonside and its first known reference is in documents in the fifteenth century.

== See also ==
- Falkirk Braes villages
- List of places in Falkirk council area
