= Reddingmuirhead =

Coordinates: 55.981°N 3.739°W

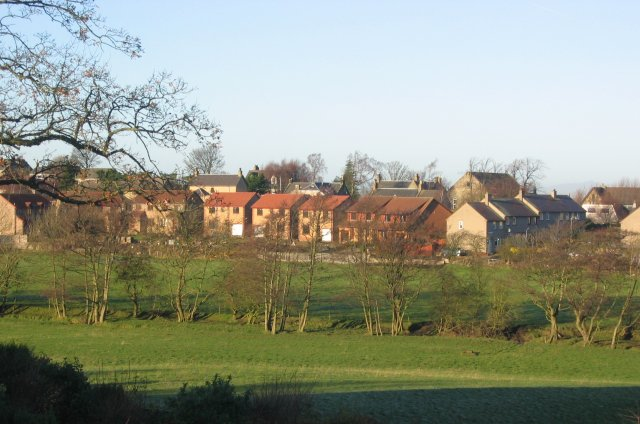
- Houses in Reddingmuirhead

- Location within the Falkirk council area
- Population: 2,210 (2020)
- OS grid reference: NS915778
- Civil parish: Grangemouth
- Council area: Falkirk
- Country: Scotland
- Sovereign state: United Kingdom
- Post town: FALKIRK
- Postcode district: FK2
- Dialling code: 01324
- Police: Scotland
- Fire: Scottish
- Ambulance: Scottish
- UK Parliament: Falkirk
- Scottish Parliament: Falkirk East

Reddingmuirhead is a village located in Stirlingshire, Falkirk council area, Central Scotland. A few hundred yards uphill from the village of Redding, it is between Shieldhill and Brightons.

The village contains a large Co-operative Society building, the shops of which provide most everyday requirements, one small general store, and one licensed grocer who also looks after the post office, and a large secondary school, Braes High. It was notable in recent times for the success of its local Sunday football team, Blairlodge AFC, which competed in the Falkirk and District League.

Reddingmuirhead is also the location of the Polmont Young Offenders Institution.

== See also ==
- Falkirk Braes villages
