= Falkirk (UK Parliament constituency) =

UK Parliament constituency (since 2005)

- County constituency for the House of Commons
- Location of Falkirk within Scotland
- Subdivision: Falkirk
- Electorate: 75,067 (March 2020)
- Major settlements: Camelon, Falkirk, Larbert, Polmont

Current constituency
- Created: 2005
- Member of Parliament: Euan Stainbank (Labour)
- Created from: Falkirk West and Falkirk East

Falkirk is a county constituency of the House of Commons of the Parliament of the United Kingdom. It was created for the 2005 general election, replacing Falkirk West and part of Falkirk East.

Until 2024, it was considered a safe SNP seat: at the 2015 general election, it was the seat with the largest majority for the SNP as well as the seat with the largest majority for any party in Scotland, retaining its record in the 2019 general election. In 2024, Labour candidate Euan Stainbank defeated the SNP candidate after the retirement of previous MP John McNally in a political upset, returning the seat to Labour for the first time in over a decade.

== Boundaries ==
Map of boundaries 2005–2024

Map of boundaries from 2024

The constituency takes in the town of the same name and stretches west to include Denny and Banknock and east to the village of Whitecross. Falkirk is joined by most of the various sized towns and villages of its council area, including Bainsford, Banknock, Bonnybridge, Brightons, Camelon, Denny, Glen Village/Hallglen, Head of Muir, Laurieston, Maddiston, Polmont, Redding, Rumford, Shieldhill, Tamfourhill, Wallacestone, Westquarter and Whitecross.

2005–2024: Under the Fifth Review of UK Parliament constituencies, the boundaries were defined in accordance with the ward structure in place on 30 November 2004. Further to reviews of local government ward boundaries which came into effect in 2007 and 2017, but did not affect the parliamentary boundaries, the constituency comprised the following wards or part wards of Falkirk Council: Bonnybridge and Larbert; Carse, Kinnaird and Tryst; Denny and Banknock; Falkirk North (except a very small part); Falkirk South; Lower Braes (majority); and Upper Braes (minority).

2024–present: Further to the 2023 review of Westminster constituencies which came into effect for the 2024 general election, the constituency is composed of the Falkirk Council wards of:

- Denny and Banknock, Falkirk North, Falkirk South, Lower Braes, Upper Braes, and southern parts of Bonnybridge and Larbert, including Bonnybridge.

Carse, Kinnaird and Tryst ward and northern parts of Bonnybridge and Larbert ward were moved to the new constituency of Alloa and Grangemouth, partly offset by the addition of remaining parts of Falkirk North, Lower Braes and Upper Braes wards, transferred from Linlithgow and East Falkirk.

== History ==
The Labour Party leadership was embroiled in a row with the Unite the Union over the selection of a candidate to replace disgraced former Labour MP Eric Joyce. In 2013, local officials of Unite, led by Len McCluskey, were accused of abusing membership procedures by "bulk-buying" and "packing" the Falkirk Constituency Labour Party with their own members in an attempt to get their preferred candidate, Karie Murphy (Labour election chief Tom Watson's office manager), selected. Unite was alleged to have signed up and paid the subscriptions for over 100 new party members in Falkirk, some of them allegedly unaware they were joining the Labour Party.

A leaked Unite document from December 2012 detailed its activity in Falkirk as "exemplary" for the way in which "we have recruited well over 100 Unite members to the party in a constituency with less than 200 members. 57 came from responses to a text message alone, (followed up face to face). A collective effort locally, but led and inspired by the potential candidate".

On 25 June 2013, Falkirk CLP was placed in "special measures" by the National Executive Committee at an emergency meeting after an internal report found "sufficient evidence for concern about the legitimacy of some new recruits to the Falkirk party." Under Labour's rules, the Central party takes control over a constituency party when in special measures and directly runs the parliamentary selection process. All members who had joined the constituency party in Falkirk after 12 March 2012 (the date Eric Joyce announced he would not stand for re-election) had their memberships suspended. Unite union responded to the NEC's disciplinary measure in a press statement:

“Unite rejects the decisions taken today by the Labour Party in relation to the Falkirk West selection process. It does so on behalf of the many decent trade unionists who have joined the Party in good faith and are now to be denied any say in the choice of their Labour parliamentary candidate. None of the allegations contained in the report of the so-called “investigation” have been put to Unite in clear breach of natural justice. The intervention by Party officials into this process has been driven by Blairite pressure to exclude trade unionists from any influence in the Party, an ambition clearly spelled out by Peter Mandelson last month. Trade unionists will draw their own conclusions regarding the integrity of the Party’s procedures.”

In July, Labour Party Leader Ed Miliband blamed "a few individuals" for vote-rigging in Falkirk, saying: "Instead of defending what happened in Falkirk, Len McCluskey should be facing up to his responsibilities. He should not be defending the machine politics involving bad practice and malpractice that went on there, he should be facing up to it." As the controversy grew, Tom Watson, a former flatmate of McCluskey, resigned on 4 July from the Shadow Cabinet. Unite's favoured candidate Karie Murphy (a close friend of McCluskey) and the Falkirk CLP chairman Stephen Deans (who is also chair of the Unite trade union in Scotland) were also suspended by Labour HQ on the same day. The internal Labour Party investigation report into the matter was handed on 5 July to the Scottish police service. A Labour spokesperson said: "Until yesterday our advice was that there was no evidence of criminality. That changed after the solicitor took a look at it."

Len McCluskey rejected the NEC report's allegations that the Falkirk CLP selection was fixed as "smears" against Unite. He called on Ed Miliband for the internal party report to be published for "everyone to see" and for Miliband to set up an independent inquiry with the credibility to establish the truth. In an article for The Guardian, the sitting MP Eric Joyce called the actions of certain Unite officials in Falkirk as "amateurish, hubristic and irresponsible". The National Executive Committee confirmed it would impose an all women shortlist on the Falkirk CLP.

== Members of Parliament ==
This seat was formed from Falkirk West and much of Falkirk East.

Election	Member	Party	Notes
2005	Eric Joyce	Labour	MP for Falkirk West from 2000
2012	Eric Joyce	Independent	MP for Falkirk West from 2000
2015	John McNally	SNP	
2024	Euan Stainbank	Labour	

== Election results ==
=== Elections in the 2020s ===
General election 2024: Falkirk
Party	Candidate	Votes	%	±%
Labour	Euan Stainbank	18,343	43.0	+30.9
SNP	Toni Giugliano	13,347	31.3	−20.5
Conservative	James Bundy	3,576	8.4	−17.5
Reform	Keith Barrow	3,375	7.9	+7.5
Green	Rachel Kidd	1,711	4.0	+0.9
Liberal Democrats	Tim McKay	1,092	2.6	−4.2
Independent	Mark Tunnicliff	600	1.4	New
Alba	Zohaib Arshad	581	1.4	New
Majority		4,996	11.7	N/A
Turnout		42,625	57.9	−8.0
Registered electors		73,584		
Labour gain from SNP		Swing	+25.7	

=== Elections in the 2010s ===
2019 notional result (Note: Estimate of the 2019 general election result as if the revised boundaries recommended under the 2023 boundary review were in place)
Party	Vote	%
SNP	25,210	51.8
Conservative	12,632	25.9
Labour	5,880	12.1
Liberal Democrats	3,304	6.8
Scottish Greens	1,511	3.1
Brexit Party	176	0.4
Majority	12,578	25.8
Turnout	58,713	64.9
Electorate	75,067	

General election 2019: Falkirk
Party	Candidate	Votes	%	±%
SNP	John McNally	29,351	52.5	+13.6
Conservative	Lynn Munro	14,403	25.8	−0.4
Labour	Safia Ali	6,243	11.2	−18.6
Liberal Democrats	Austin Reid	3,990	7.1	+5.0
Green	Tom McLaughlin	1,885	3.4	+1.7
Majority		14,948	26.7	+17.6
Turnout		55,872	66.1	+0.6
SNP hold		Swing	+7.0	

Safia Ali was suspended by the Labour Party over allegations that she made anti-Semitic posts on Facebook. Because nominations had closed at the time of her suspension, she still appeared on the ballot paper as the Labour candidate. The fall in the Labour Party's vote share of 18.6% was the worst that the party suffered in Scotland, and the 11th worst in the 630 seats it contested in the United Kingdom, at this election.

This was the largest numerical majority in Scotland at the 2019 general election.

General election 2017: Falkirk
Party	Candidate	Votes	%	±%
SNP	John McNally	20,952	38.9	−18.8
Labour	Craig Martin	16,029	29.8	+4.7
Conservative	Callum Laidlaw	14,088	26.2	+14.1
Liberal Democrats	Austin Reid	1,120	2.1	+0.1
Green	Debra Pickering	908	1.7	New
UKIP	Stuart Martin	712	1.3	−1.7
Majority		4,923	9.1	−23.5
Turnout		53,809	65.5	−6.9
SNP hold		Swing	−11.8	

General election 2015: Falkirk
Party	Candidate	Votes	%	±%
SNP	John McNally	34,831	57.7	+27.4
Labour	Karen Whitefield	15,130	25.1	−20.6
Conservative	Alison Harris	7,325	12.1	+0.9
UKIP	David Coburn	1,829	3.0	+0.5
Liberal Democrats	Galen Milne	1,225	2.0	−8.3
Majority		19,701	32.6	N/A
Turnout		60,340	72.4	+10.4
SNP gain from Labour		Swing	+24.1	

General election 2010: Falkirk
Party	Candidate	Votes	%	±%
Labour	Eric Joyce	23,207	45.7	−5.2
SNP	John McNally	15,364	30.3	+8.9
Conservative	Katie Mackie	5,698	11.2	+1.3
Liberal Democrats	Kieran Leach	5,225	10.3	−5.7
UKIP	Brian Goldie	1,283	2.5	New
Majority		7,843	15.4	−15.9
Turnout		50,777	62.0	+2.4
Labour hold		Swing	−7.0	

=== Elections in the 2000s ===
General election 2005: Falkirk
Party	Candidate	Votes	%	±%
Labour	Eric Joyce	23,264	50.9	−2.9
SNP	Laura Love	9,789	21.4	−2.2
Liberal Democrats	Callum Chomczuk	7,321	16.0	+9.2
Conservative	David Potts	4,538	9.9	+1.5
Scottish Socialist	Danny Quinlan	838	1.8	−0.5
Majority		13,475	29.5	−0.7
Turnout		45,750	59.6	+2.2
Labour win (new seat)				
