= Avonbridge =

Coordinates: 55.934°N 03.744°W

Avonbridge: Scottish Gaelic: Drochaid na h-Aibhne; Bridge of the River
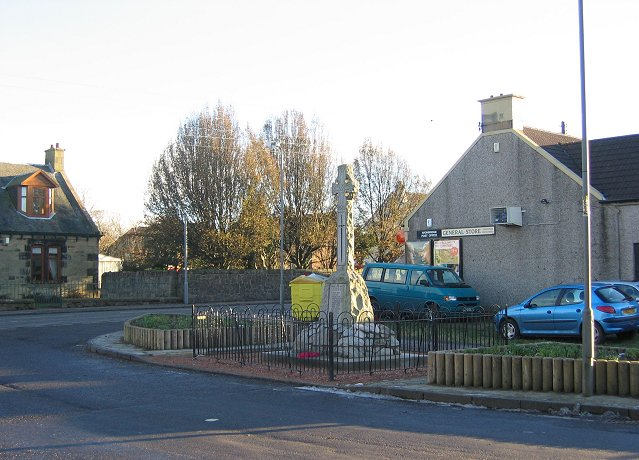
- The centre of Avonbridge, with a war memorial in the foreground

- Location within the Falkirk council area
- Area: 0.11 sq mi (0.28 km^{2})
- Population: 660 (2020)
  - Density: 6,000/sq mi (2,300/km^{2})
- OS grid reference: NS911726
  - Edinburgh: 21.5 mi (34.6 km) E
  - London: 340 mi (550 km) SSE
- Civil parish: Slamannan; Muiravonside
- Council area: Falkirk
- Lieutenancy area: Stirling and Falkirk
- Country: Scotland
- Sovereign state: United Kingdom
- Post town: FALKIRK
- Postcode district: FK1 2
- Dialling code: 01324
- UK Parliament: Falkirk
- Scottish Parliament: Falkirk East
- Website: falkirk.gov.uk

Avonbridge (Scottish Gaelic: Drochaid na h-Aibhne) is a small village which lies within the Falkirk council area of Scotland. The village is 4.8 miles (7.7 km) south-southeast of the town of Falkirk. Avonbridge sits just inside the council boundary line between Falkirk and West Lothian councils.

The village lies at the junction of the B8028 and B825 roads and is a bridging point over the River Avon, hence the name Avonbridge. At the time of the 2011 census, a population of 652 residents was recorded.

== History ==
During the nineteenth and twentieth centuries Avonbridge was home to small scale open cast coal mining. The village also had a brickworks in the mid twentieth century, "Avonbridge Brickworks", but today no longer exists. Nowadays the village is largely residential although Avonbridge is the base of operations for "Stevenson Brothers" a haulage company, whose bright orange heavy goods vehicles transport goods across the United Kingdom.

== Toponymy ==
The name Avonbridge derives from the fact that the village crosses a river. The affix "avon" is often found in the Celtic language which denotes the presence of a river, in this case the River Avon. This is found in Scottish Gaelic as "abhainn/a river," with genitive "aibhne/of a river." Drochaid na h-Aibhne literally means Bridge of the River.

== See also ==
- List of places in Falkirk council area
