= Polmont =

Coordinates: 55.990785°N 3.706423°W

Polmont: Scottish Gaelic: Poll-Mhonadh; Scots: Powmont
- Top: Parkhill House, Middle: Union Canal, Bottom left: Old Polmont Reservoir and golf course Bottom right: Meadowbank Library.

- Location within the Falkirk council area
- Population: 5,040 (2020)
- OS grid reference: NS936788
- Civil parish: Polmont
- Council area: Falkirk
- Lieutenancy area: Stirling and Falkirk
- Country: Scotland
- Sovereign state: United Kingdom
- Post town: FALKIRK
- Postcode district: FK2
- Dialling code: 01324
- Police: Scotland
- Fire: Scottish
- Ambulance: Scottish
- UK Parliament: Falkirk
- Scottish Parliament: Falkirk East

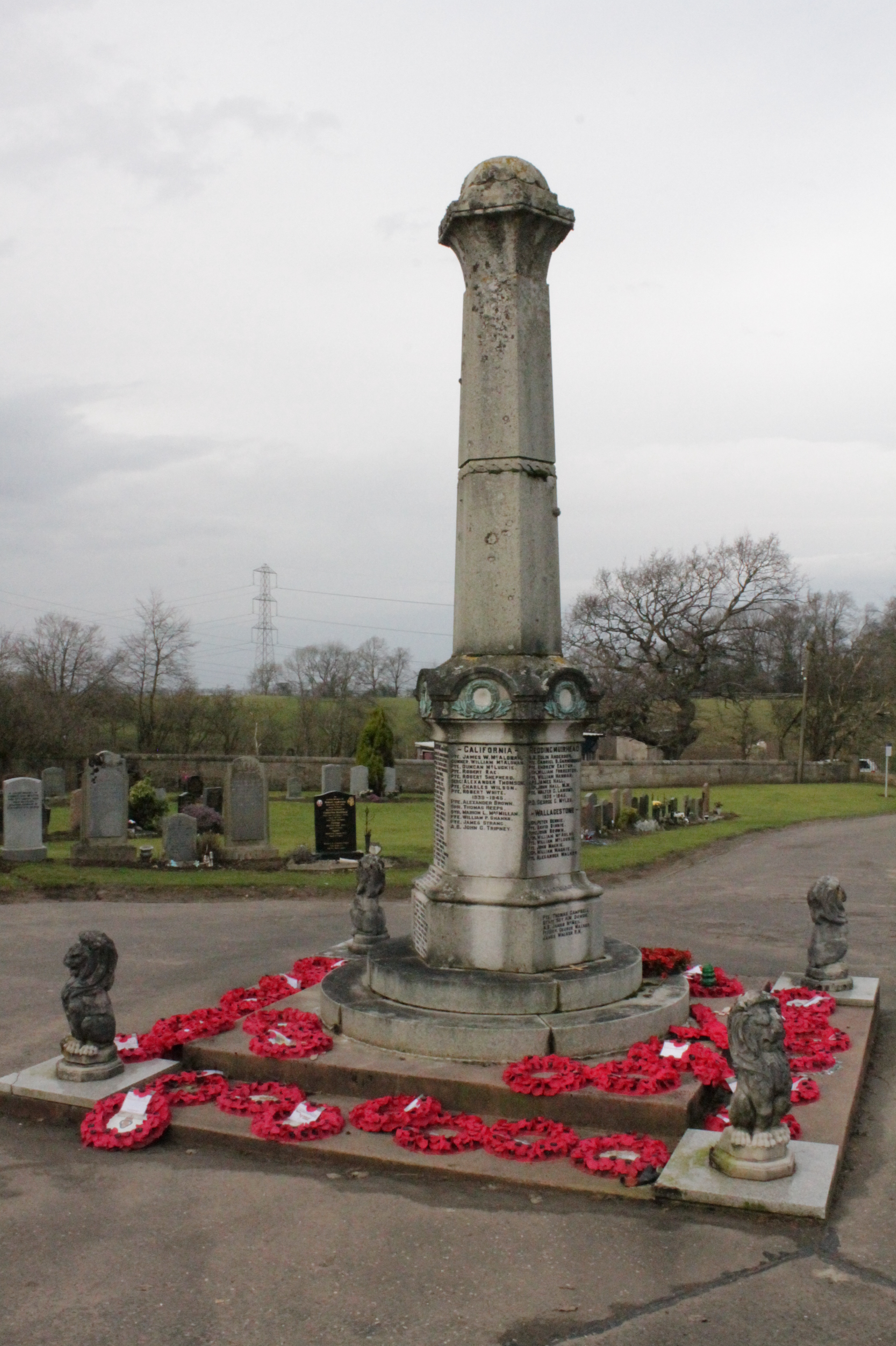
Polmont War Memorial

Polmont (Scottish Gaelic: Poll-Mhonadh) is a village in the Falkirk council area of Central Scotland. It lies towards the east of the town of Falkirk, north of the Union Canal, which runs adjacent to the village.

Due to its situation in Central Scotland, many locations can be seen from Polmont, ranging from the Ochil Hills and the River Forth, to Cairnpapple Hill. Although giving its name to Polmont Young Offenders Institution, the prison is in fact in Reddingmuirhead.

== History ==
The name Polmont derives from the Scottish Gaelic term Poll-Mhonadh, which translates into English as "Pool of the Hill".

Old Polmont was situated on a raised beach overlooking the Firth of Forth and the Ochils. There were two Roman temporary marching camps, one on either side of what is now Grangemouth Golf Course: on the western side was Little Kerse, and on the eastern side was Polmont Hill. The Antonine Wall ran through Polmont from Mumrills, the largest fort on the wall, west of Polmont. Remains of the wall can best be seen in Polmont Woods, accessed by a footpath next to the M9 motorway bridge.

The first mention of Polmont was in 1498, relating to the Chapel of the Blessed Virgin Mary. The next mention was in the Statistical Accounts of Scotland. Old Polmont has changed little as can be seen from this 1862 Map but, in 1968, the first section of the M9 motorway cut through farm land between Old and New Polmont.

Polmont was originally included within the parish of Falkirk, but was severed under the authority of the Court of Teinds (teind is the Scots word for tithe), and made an independent parish, in 1724. The parish boundary was from the Firth of Forth up to Muiravonside, and it was later renamed Grangemouth Parish as the port of Grangemouth grew. Nothing of the early history of Polmont has been recorded.

New Polmont was built along the Great North Road (A9), south of Old Polmont, and was originally called Bennetstown or Bennestone (named after the Laird of Whyteside, Mr Bennet, on whose land it was built. Apart from housing, agricultural workshops and stores, it also had three public houses: The Crown, The Red Lion and The Black Bull, but only The Black Bull remains and dates from before 1745. The village slowly expanded after World War II with housing being built on land of former estates of Millfield, Polmont Park, and Polmont House. From the mid-1970s, the population significantly expanded when housing was built on the Gilston Estate, whereupon the village was re-designated as a dormitory town.

During World War II, the now-demolished St Margaret's School for girls was used for signals training by Polish forces, and soldiers from various Polish units were assigned there.

== Notable residents ==
- John Gibb Dunlop (1844–1913), director of John Brown and Company creator of both RMS Lusitania and RMS Aquitania
- Gilbert Laurie of Polmont (1729–1809), Lord Provost of Edinburgh
- Johan Theodor Salvesen (1820–1865), joint founder of Christian Salvesen
- James Smith (1808–1863) came to Polmont Bank House with his daughter Madeleine Smith to escape the notoriety raised by her infamous murder trial. He died there broken by the affair. She married and moved to America.

== Politics ==
Polmont is within the jurisdiction of Falkirk Council, although the suggestion of east Polmont changing hands for the purposes of the Westminster Parliamentary Constituency to Linlithgow and East Falkirk arose, but was soon discounted. In May 2007, the Polmont area merged as part of an expanded Lower Braes seat, as proposed for Falkirk Council by the Scottish Executive.

Lord Polmont is a subsidiary title of the Duke of Hamilton. This title was originally given to the 2nd Duke of Hamilton in 1639.

One of the current councillors for Polmont (and the rest of the Lower Braes Ward) in Falkirk Council is Scottish Conservative Councillor Malcolm Nicol, who has held the role since 2000 following the death of his predecessor, Frank Hodge. He previously represented a seat in Grangemouth, originally being elected in 1983. SNP Councillor Steven Jackson has also represented Polmont, which is part of the larger Lower Braes Ward, since May 2007, being elected for the first time through the Single Transferable Vote system.

Polmont is unusual for a town in the Falkirk area in that a local by-election in 2000 saw a Conservative candidate returned with over half of the popular vote.

== Economy ==
The economy of Polmont is based mainly upon relatively small scale private enterprise, such as pubs, cafes, hotels, take-aways and convenience stores. The majority of these are based in or around Polmont shopping centre, the focal point of local custom. Agriculture is also a central industry, with arable land consuming a sizeable proportion of the area. Polmont is home to the controversial Avondale Landfill, a large employer on the east of the village.

Due to the proximity to Grangemouth, a number of the population work at the Grangemouth refineries and port. Few of the population work in Polmont itself, leaving it something of a commuter town, largely to Edinburgh and Glasgow.

There are several hotels in the area, with the most well known being the Inchyra Grange, a redevelopment from one of the area's many former mansions.

== Transport ==
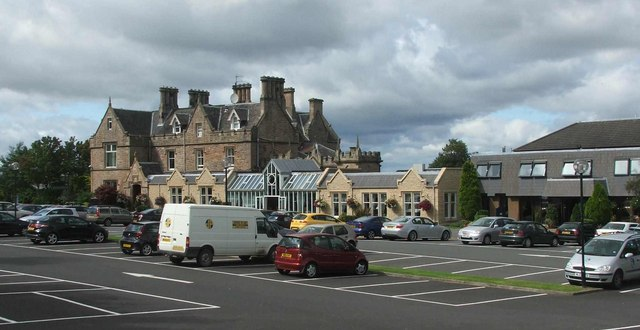
Inchyra Grange Hotel, a redevelopment of one of the area's former mansions

Polmont railway station is located on the Edinburgh to Glasgow railway line. In 1984 a train collided with a cow that had strayed onto the rail line near Polmont. The crash left 13 people dead and 61 others injured.

The M9 motorway runs through the village between Polmont and Old Polmont, with two exit points on the east and west sides. There are numerous bus stops throughout the village, primarily situated on Polmont Main Street, which provide direct bus services to Edinburgh, Falkirk and Stirling. The nearest airport, Edinburgh Airport, is located approximately 17 miles (27 kilometres) to the east.

== Education ==
Polmont has provided primary level education since the 1700s. The original Parish School still stands across from the church; however, in the 1960s Polmont Primary School became overcrowded and relocated to a set of interlinked wooden huts on Greenpark Drive. Polmont Primary's colours are green and silver reflected in the uniform of green blazer, green/silver tie, grey shorts/skirts and white shirts/blouses. Further expansion of Polmont meant that the school again became overcrowded; finally, a permanent structure was built in the south west of Polmont and renamed St Margaret's Primary School. St. Margaret's had been the name of a private school that had stood between 1895 and 1948 on the site of houses that are now on the west side of Stevenson Avenue.

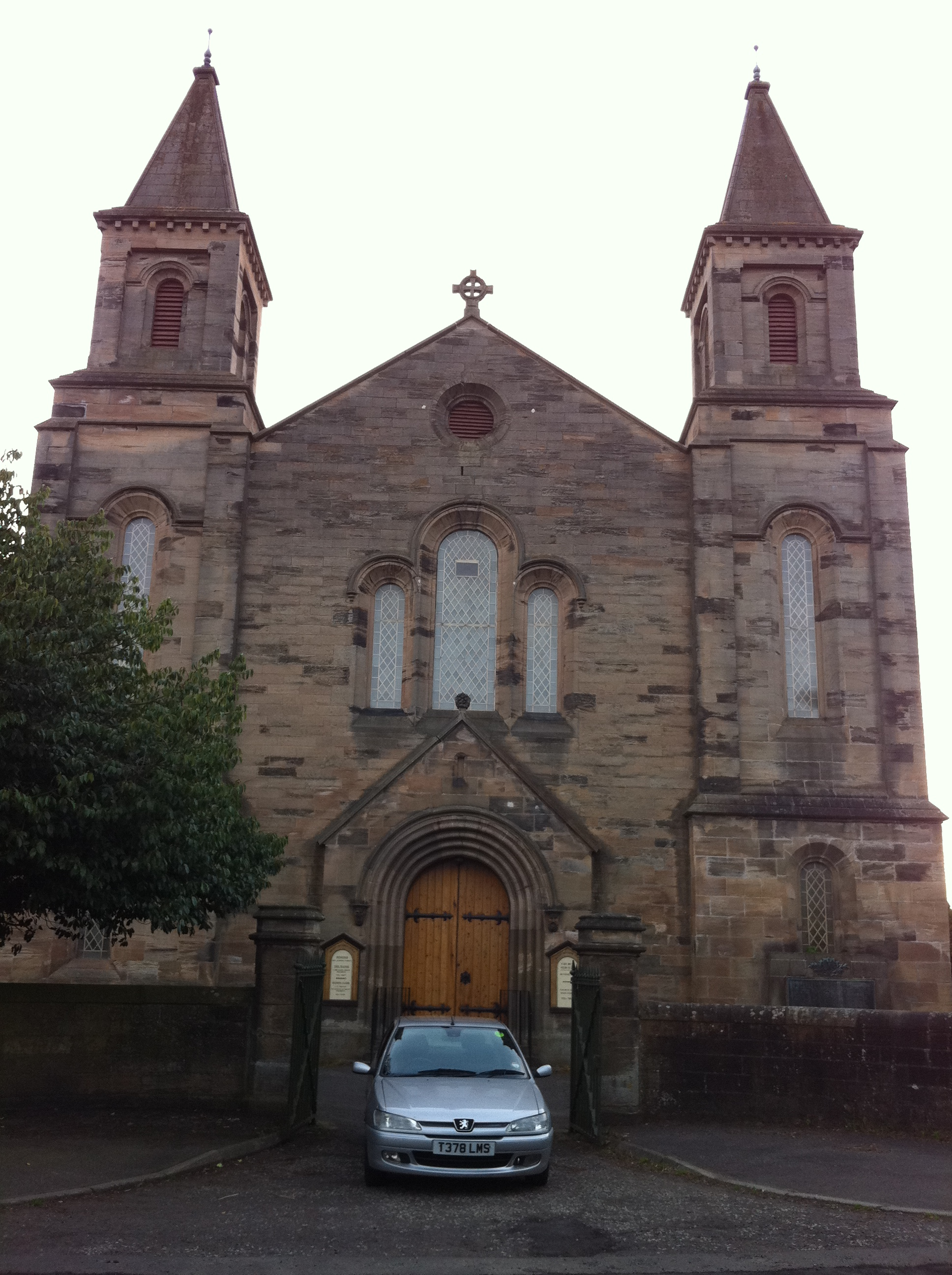
Polmont Old Parish Church

== Culture ==
Polmont Parish Church was designed by John Tait in 1844.

Polmont is a parish and its religious community is primarily Christian, being home to a Church of Scotland in Old Polmont. The area also has a Christian denominational presence in the form of the Church of the Brethren and the Religious Society of Friends.

Scottish rock band Glasvegas have a song entitled "Polmont On My Mind" on their debut album, Glasvegas, referring to the prison.

Parkhill House and grounds were used as a location in the fourth season of Outlander (TV series) It was transformed into a graveyard and was filmed over a few evenings

The grounds of the former Millfield House folly still remains including its bowling green with steps at either side which is flanked by two beautiful Canadian redwoods at either side.It also has remains of a Lily pond and wildfowl lake.The burn at the side was also sloped with stone and has trickle waterfalls along its length

Polmont won best small town in Scotland in Bloom awards 2023 for the first time ever.

== Sport ==
=== Football ===
Polmont has an amateur football club. Since the 2014–15 season they have played in Division One Stirling & District AFA. The club play their home games at Meadowbank Bank, St. Margaret's in the east of the village. There was once a junior club representing the area but the club only lasted a few years. Another club, Rumford Rovers, played at senior level briefly in the 1890s.

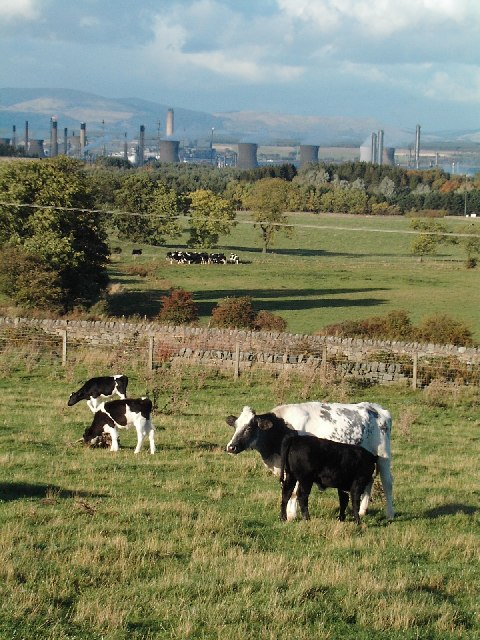
Farmland in Polmont looking towards Grangemouth industry

The most famous sporting export of Polmont is Alex Raisbeck, who spent several years captaining Liverpool. He also represented Scotland on eight occasions, and was considered to have been one of the finest players of his generation, dating back to 1898. He captained Liverpool to their first ever English championship title in 1901 and did so again five years later.

The highest-profile Polmontarian currently playing at senior level is Derek Niven, formerly of Chesterfield.

=== Other sports ===
Despite its name, Grangemouth Golf Club is located on the outskirts of Polmont.

Within the boundaries of Grangemouth Golf Club is Millhall Reservoir, which is now a fishery. To the east of the clubhouse is Polmont Ski Centre, which includes an artificial ski slope.

== See also ==
- Falkirk Braes villages
