= Stirling and Falkirk =

Coordinates: 56.061°N 3.847°W

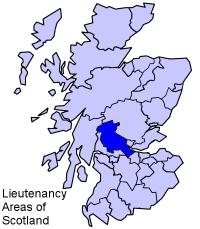

Stirling and Falkirk is a lieutenancy area of Scotland. It consists of the local government areas of Stirling and Falkirk, which cover the same areas as the previous districts from 1975 to 1996.
