= Stirlingshire =

Coordinates: 56°15′N 4°15′W

- Historic county
- Coat of arms

- Country: Scotland
- County town: Stirling

Area
  - Total: 447 sq mi (1,158 km^{2})
- Ranked 21st of 34

Population (2022)
  - Total: 238,071
  - Density: 532.5/sq mi (205.6/km^{2})
- Chapman code: STI

Stirlingshire or the County of Stirling (Scottish Gaelic: Siorrachd Sruighlea [ˈʃirˠəxk ˈs̪t̪ɾuʝlə]) is a historic county and registration county of Scotland. Its county town is Stirling.

It borders Perthshire to the north, Clackmannanshire to the east, West Lothian to the south-east, Lanarkshire to the south, and Dunbartonshire to the south and south-west (this latter boundary is split in two owing to Dunbartonshire's Cumbernauld exclave).

== History ==
In 1130, Stirling, one of the principal royal strongholds of the Kingdom of Scotland, was created a royal burgh by King David I.

On 11 September 1297, the forces of Andrew Moray and William Wallace defeated the combined English forces of John de Warenne, 6th Earl of Surrey, and Hugh de Cressingham near Stirling, on the River Forth, at the Battle of Stirling Bridge during the First War of Scottish Independence.

On 22 July 1298 the Battle of Falkirk saw the defeat of William Wallace by King Edward I of England.

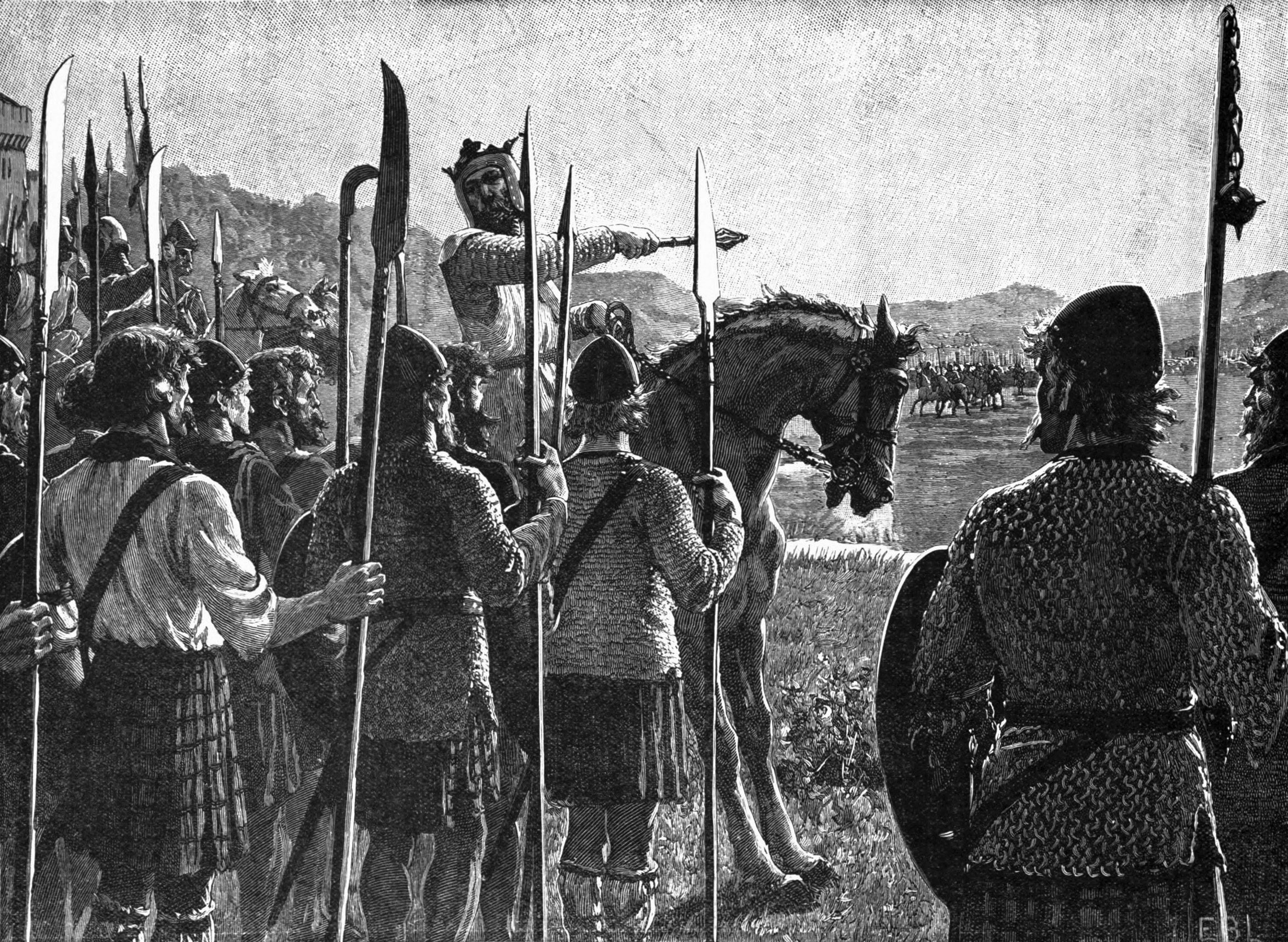
Robert the Bruce addressing his troops before the Battle of Bannockburn (1907 illustration)

On 24 June 1314 the Battle of Bannockburn at Bannockburn, (Blàr Allt a' Bhonnaich in Scottish Gaelic) was a significant Scottish victory in the Wars of Scottish Independence. It was one of the decisive battles of the First War of Scottish Independence.

On 11 June 1488 the Battle of Sauchieburn was fought at the side of Sauchie Burn, a stream about two miles south of Stirling. The battle was fought between the followers of King James III of Scotland and a large group of rebellious Scottish nobles including Alexander Home, 1st Lord Home, nominally led by the king's 15-year-old son, Prince James, Duke of Rothesay (reigned 1488–1513).

In 1645 the Covenanter army under General William Baillie formed near Banton for their engagement with the Royalist forces under the command of Montrose at the Battle of Kilsyth, Kilsyth, on 15 August 1645; a major battle of the Wars of the Three Kingdoms.

The Battle of Falkirk Muir on 17 January 1746 saw the Jacobites under Charles Edward Stuart defeat a government army commanded by Lieutenant General Henry Hawley.

=== Administrative history ===
Stirlingshire's origins as a shire (the area administered by a sheriff) are obscure, but it seems to have been created during the reign of David I (reigned 1124–1153), who had also made Stirling a burgh. The precise extent of the early shire is unknown; it is thought that it originally covered a relatively small area in the immediate vicinity of Stirling itself, but subsequently gained territory from neighbouring shires, notably from West Lothian to the south and Dunbartonshire to the south-west. The boundary with Dunbartonshire in particular was altered several times. In the thirteenth century an area north-east of Loch Lomond was transferred from Dunbartonshire to Stirlingshire, whilst the two parishes of Kirkintilloch and Cumbernauld were transferred from Stirlingshire to Dunbartonshire, despite not adjoining the rest of Dunbartonshire. These changes were reversed in 1504, when Kirkintilloch and Cumbernauld were restored to Stirlingshire and the area north-east of Loch Lomond went back to Dunbartonshire, but the change was short-lived, being reverted again in 1509.

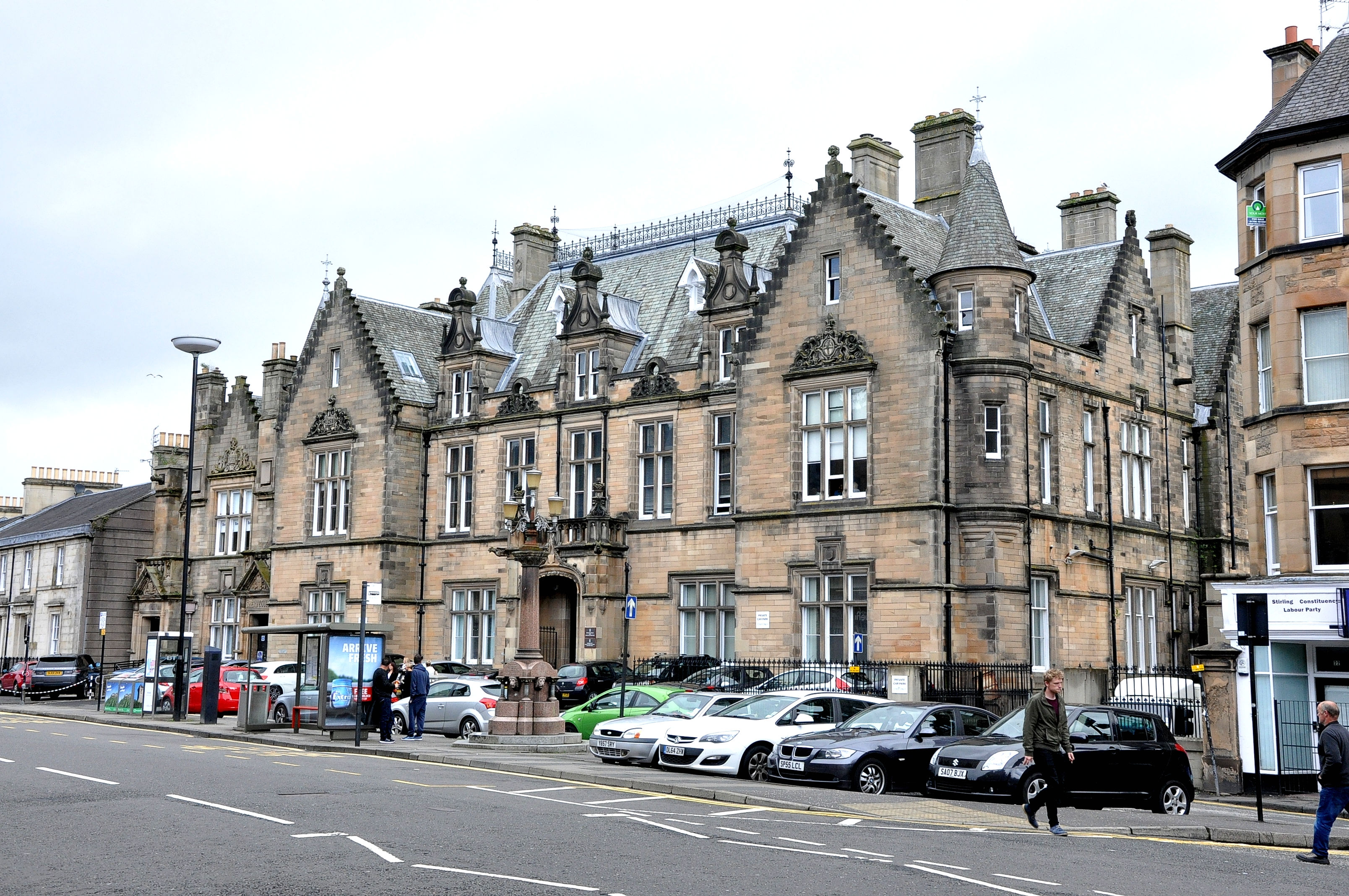
County Buildings, Viewfield Place, Barnton Street, Stirling

Commissioners of Supply were established in 1667 to act as the main administrative body for the shire. Elected county councils were established in 1890 under the Local Government (Scotland) Act 1889, taking most of the functions of the commissioners (which were eventually abolished in 1930). The burgh of Stirling was deemed capable of managing its own affairs and so was excluded from the administrative area of the county council, although the county council still chose to base itself there. Stirlingshire County Council held its first meeting on 22 May 1890 at the County Buildings (which also served as the sheriff court) on Barnton Street in Stirling, which had been built in 1875.

The 1889 act also led to a review of boundaries, with several exclaves being transferred to a county they actually bordered, and parishes which straddled more than one county being adjusted such that each parish was entirely in a single county. These changes saw Stirlingshire cede Milngavie to Dunbartonshire, Alva to Clackmannanshire, and part of the parish of Lecropt to Perthshire. In return Stirlingshire gained Cambuskenneth from Clackmannanshire, the part of Kippen parish which had been in Perthshire, and all of an adjusted Logie parish (which had previously straddled Stirlingshire, Clackmannanshire and Perthshire).

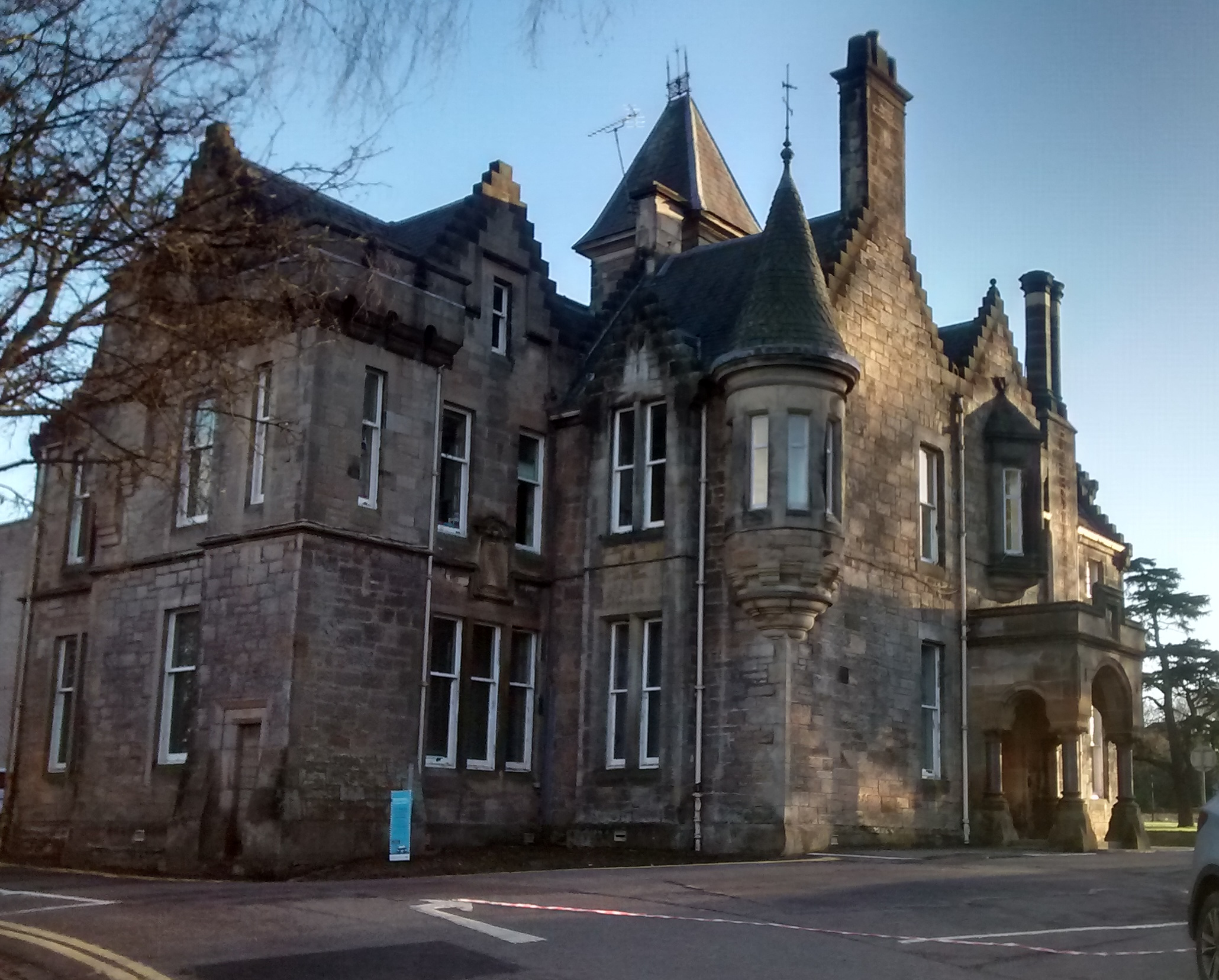
Old Viewforth, Pitt Terrace, Stirling: headquarters of Stirlingshire County Council after 1931

Until 1930 the county council met at the County Buildings. Reforms in 1930 under the Local Government (Scotland) Act 1929 saw the burgh of Stirling brought within the administrative area of the county council, and the county council take over the functions of the formerly separate Stirlingshire Education Authority. The education authority had bought the former Royal Infirmary building at 33 Spittal Street in Stirling in 1929 to use as its headquarters. The county council moved its meeting place to Spittal Street in 1930, but still needed more office space for its staff. In 1931 the council bought a house called Viewforth on Pitt Terrace, where it built a large extension including a council chamber, which was completed in 1937. Viewforth then served as the county council's headquarters until its abolition in 1975.

Stirlingshire was abolished for local government purposes in 1975 under the Local Government (Scotland) Act 1973, which replaced Scotland's counties, burghs and landward districts with a two-tier structure of regions and districts. Most of Stirlingshire became part of the Central region, while a smaller area around Kilsyth went instead to Strathclyde region. At the district level, the county was divided between four districts, all of which also incorporated territory from other counties: Stirling district and Falkirk district in Central region and Cumbernauld and Kilsyth district and Strathkelvin district in Strathclyde region. A Stirling and Falkirk lieutenancy area was created covering the Stirling and Falkirk districts, and the last Lord Lieutenant of Stirlingshire became the first Lord Lieutenant of Stirling and Falkirk.

Further local government reforms in 1996 saw the regions and districts created in 1975 abolished and replaced with council areas providing all local government services. Since 1996 the area of the pre-1975 county of Stirlingshire has straddled the four council areas of East Dunbartonshire, Falkirk, North Lanarkshire, and Stirling.

The pre-1975 boundaries of Stirlingshire are still used for some limited official purposes connected with land registration, being a registration county.

== Coat of arms ==
Stirlingshire County Council was granted a coat of arms by Lord Lyon King of Arms on 29 September 1890. The design of the arms commemorated the Scottish victory at the Battle of Bannockburn in the county.

On the silver saltire on blue of St Andrew was placed the rampant red lion from the royal arms of Scotland. Around this were placed two caltraps and two spur-rowels recalling the use of the weapons against the English cavalry.

On the abolition of the county council in 1975, the arms were regranted to Stirling District Council. They were regranted a second time in 1996 to the present Stirling Council, with the addition of supporters (a goshawk and a wolf).

== Geography ==
Stirlingshire occupies a strategic position on the Forth-Clyde isthmus commanding the main overland routes from Glasgow and Edinburgh up to central and northern Scotland.

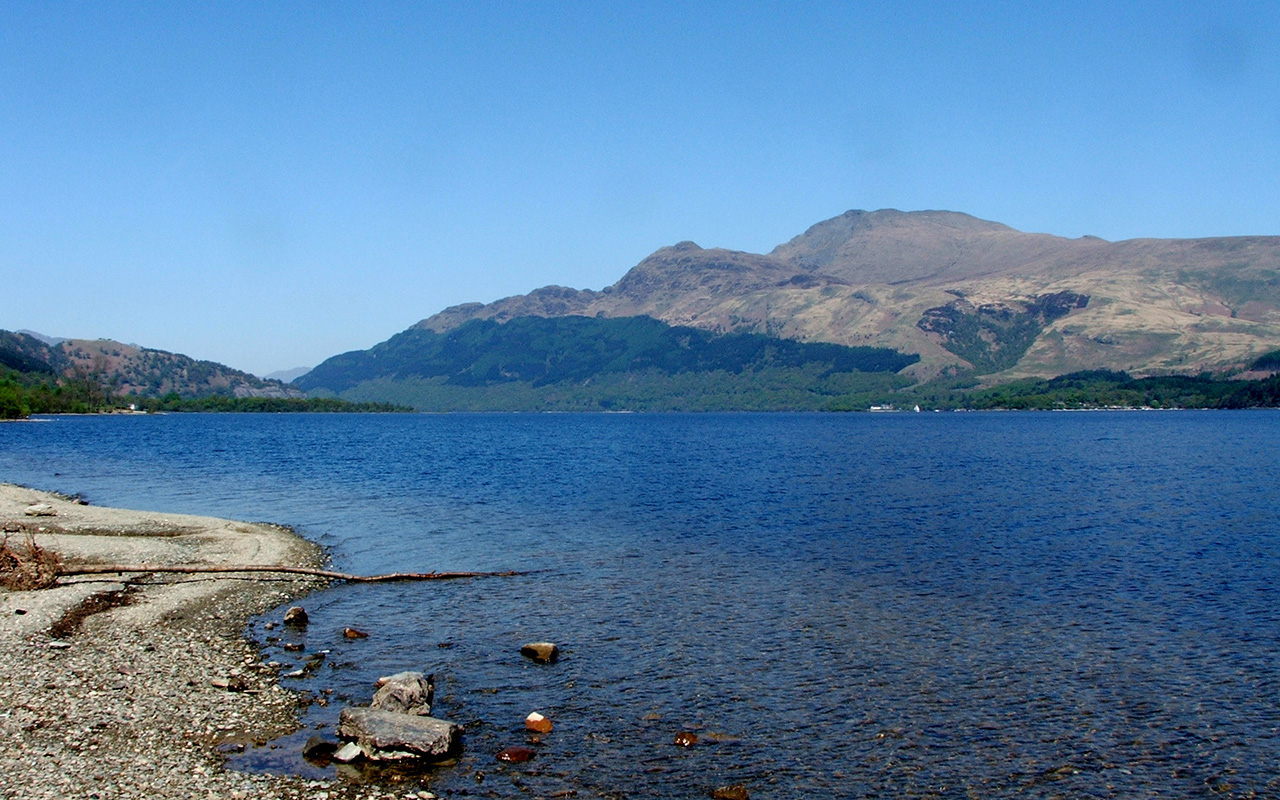
Ben Lomond looking north across Loch Lomond at the waterline

The western 'arm' of the county is sparsely populated and dominated by Loch Lomond, which it shares with Dunbartonshire, and the Trossachs (now a national park); Ben Lomond is located here and is the highest point in Stirlingshire at 974 metres (3,196 ft) and ninth highest peak in Scotland. Several islands within Loch Lomond belong to Stirlingshire, the chief of these being Eilean nan Deargannan, Bucinch, Ceardach, Inchcruin, Inchfad, Ellanderroch, Inchcailloch and Clairinsh. On the north-eastern boundary with Perthshire a small portion of Loch Katrine lies within Stirlingshire, and also the smaller Loch Arklet can be found here.

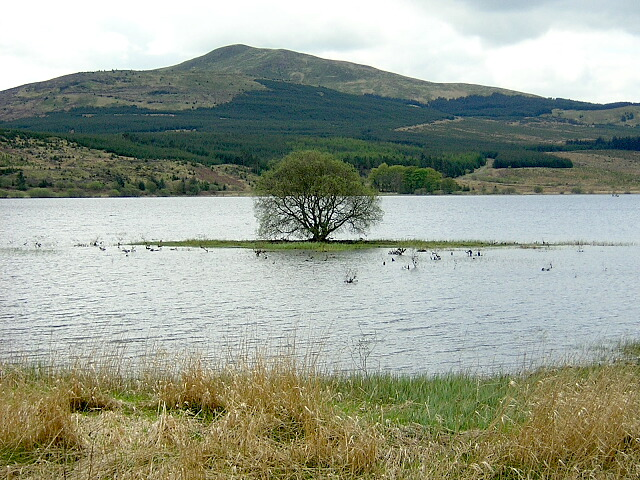
The Carron Valley Reservoir in central Stirlingshire

Central Stirlingshire contains the Carron Valley Reservoir and the Campsie Fells, Kilsyth Hills and Gargunnock Hills, with the larger towns such as Lennoxtown and Kilsyth spread out along the southern border and A891/A803 roads. The south-western corner of the county around Milngavie (transferred to Dunbartonshire in 1891) abuts the Greater Glasgow conurbation and contains several small reservoirs and lochs, such as Burncrooks Reservoir, Kilmannan Reservoir, Carbeth Loch, Craigallian Loch, Dumbrock Loch, Mugdock Loch, Mugdock/Craigmaddie Reservoir and Bardowie Loch.

The area east of the M80 is generally much flatter and contains the bulk of the county's population, with the Firth of Forth providing access to the North Sea.

== Transport ==
The bulk of Stirlingshire's motorway network lies in the eastern third of the county where the population is most concentrated; these include the M80 running north–south and connecting Stirling and Denny to Cumbernauld, and the M9 linking the eastern towns to Edinburgh. Various A roads form a circle around central Stirlingshire, with the rest of the county served by B roads.

Various ferries enable passengers to cross Loch Lomond in the far west, and the Kincardine Bridge in the far east provides access to Fife and Clackmannanshire.

Only the eastern third of the county is connected by rail, although Milngavie railway station was in the far south-west of Stirlingshire when first built, being transferred to Dunbartonshire in 1891. The railways in the east connect the towns there to each other and on to Edinburgh, Glasgow, Cumbernauld and Perth.

== Subdivisions ==
=== Burghs ===
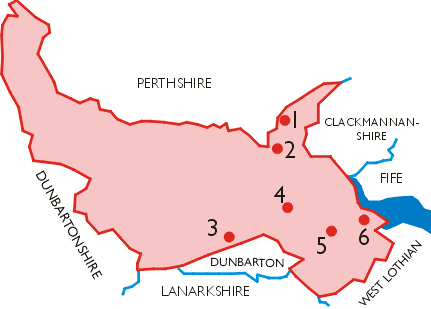
Map of Stirlingshire in 1975, showing the position of burghs in the county.

- The Royal Burgh of Stirling (from the 12th century) (No. 2 on map)
- The Burgh of Bridge of Allan (a police burgh from 1870) (1)
- The Burgh of Denny and Dunipace (a police burgh from 1877) (4)
- The Burgh of Falkirk (a burgh of barony from 1600, reformed 1832) (5)
- The Burgh of Grangemouth (a police burgh from 1877) (6)
- The Burgh of Kilsyth (a burgh of barony from 1620, a police burgh from 1878) (3)

The royal burgh of Stirling was administratively independent from the county council until 1930. In 1930 Stirling was brought into the administrative area of the county council, and Stirling and Falkirk were both designated large burghs, giving them the power to run many (but not all) local government services. The remaining four burghs became small burghs, with more limited powers.

=== Parishes ===
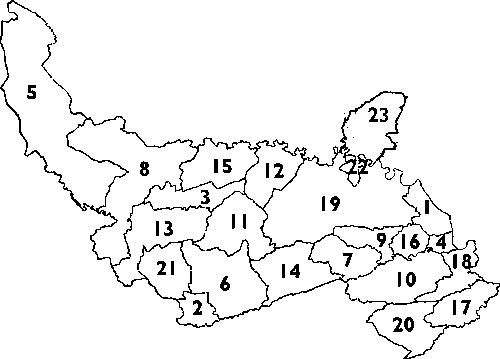
Map A: Civil parishes in Stirlingshire in use for local government until 1930.

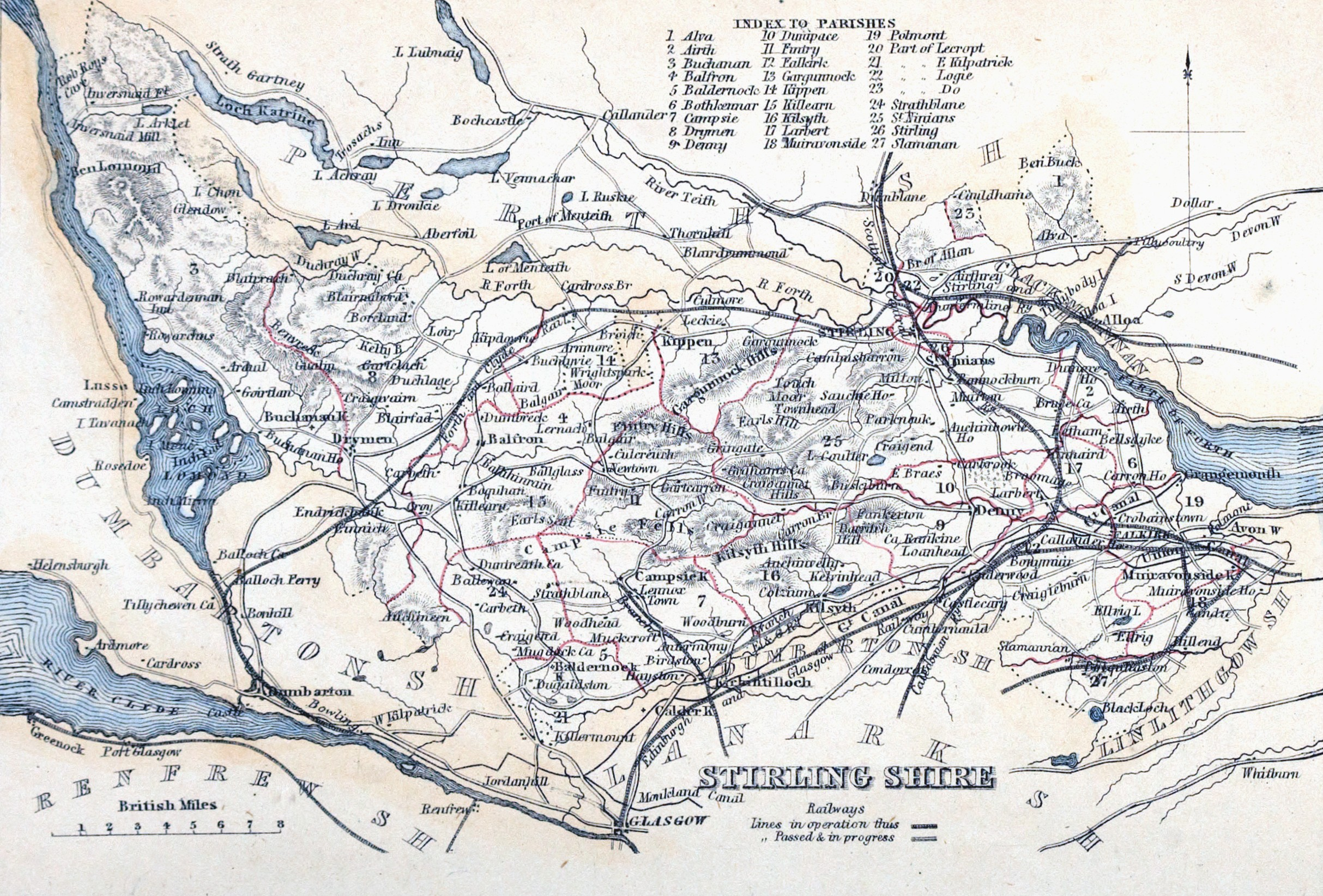
Map B: Stirlingshire Civil Parish map.

In 2001, according to the website of the General Register Office for Scotland, there were 871 civil parishes.

Civil parishes are still used for some statistical purposes, and separate census figures are published for them. As their areas have been largely unchanged since the 19th century this allows for comparison of population figures over an extended period of time.

Following the boundary changes caused by the Local Government (Scotland) Act 1889, Stirlingshire contained the following civil parishes:

- Airth (No.1 on Map A)
- Baldernock (2)
- Balfron (3)
- Bothkennar (4)
- Buchanan (5)
- Campsie (6)
- Denny (7)
- Drymen (8)
- Dunipace (9)
- Falkirk (10)
- Fintry (11)
- Gargunnock (12)
- Killearn (13)
- Kilsyth (14)
- Kippen (15)
- Larbert (16)
- Logie (23)
- Muiravonside (refer Maddiston) (17)
- Polmont (18)
- St. Ninians (19)
- Slamannan (20)
- Strathblane (21)
- Stirling (22)

In 1894 parish councils were established for the civil parishes, replacing the previous parochial boards. The parish councils were abolished in 1930, after which the parishes had no administrative functions.

=== Landward districts ===
In 1930 the landward area of the county (the part outside the burghs) was divided into eight districts. These districts were abolished in 1975.

- Central No.1
- Central No.2 (Denny, Dunipace and Kilsyth areas)
- Eastern No.1 (parishes of Airth and Larbert)
- Eastern No.2 (Falkirk and Slamannan)
- Eastern No.3 (parishes of Polmont and Muiravonside)
- Western No.1
- Western No.2
- Western No.3 (Baldernock, Campsie, Strathblane)

== Towns and villages ==
Some Stirlingshire towns listed in the Registers of Scotland, Land Register Counties.

- Airth see Civil Parish
- Allandale
- Arnprior
- Auchenbowie
- Auchenreoch
- Avonbridge
- Bainsford
- Balfron
- Balmaha
- Balmore
- Banknock
- Bankside
- Bannockburn
- Banton
- Bardowie
- Barnellan
- Blairlogie
- Blanefield
- Bonnybridge
- Boquhan
- Bothkennar Barony of Newton see Civil Parish
- Bridge of Allan see Civil Parish
- Brightons
- Buchlyvie Burgh of Barony. 1672
- California
- Callendar Park
- Cambusbarron
- Camelon
- Carron
- Carronshore
- Castlecary
- Causewayhead
- Chartershall
- Cornton
- Cowie
- Craigforth
- Craigmill
- Craigton
- Croftamie
- Denny see Civil Parish
- Dennyloanhead
- Drip Bridge
- Drymen see Civil Parish
- Dumgoyne
- Dunipace
- Dunmore
- Falkirk see Civil Parish
- Fallin
- Fankerton
- Fintry see Civil Parish
- Gargunnock see Civil Parish
- Gartness
- Glen Village
- Glensburgh
- Grangemouth
- Haggs
- Haughhead
- High Bonnybridge
- Inversnaid
- Kelvinhead
- Kersemill
- Kildean
- Killearn see Civil Parish
- Kilsyth see Civil Parish
- Kippen see Civil Parish
- Larbert see Civil Parish
- Laurieston
- Lennoxtown
- Letham
- Limerigg
- Loch Katrine
- Logie see Civil Parish
- Longcroft
- Maddiston
- Milarrochy
- Millhall
- Old Plean
- Old Sauchie
- Plean
- Polmont see Civil Parish
- Queenzieburn
- Raploch
- Redding
- Reddingmuirhead
- Rowardennan
- Rumford
- Sauchieburn
- Shieldhill
- Skinflats
- Slamannan see Civil Parish
- South Alloa
- Stirling see Civil Parish
- St Ninians see Civil Parish
- Standburn
- Strathblane
- Stenhousemuir
- Stirling
- Stoneywood
- Strathblane see Civil Parish
- Throsk
- Torrance
- Torwood
- Touch
- Wallacestone
- Westquarter
- Whins of Milton
- Whitecross
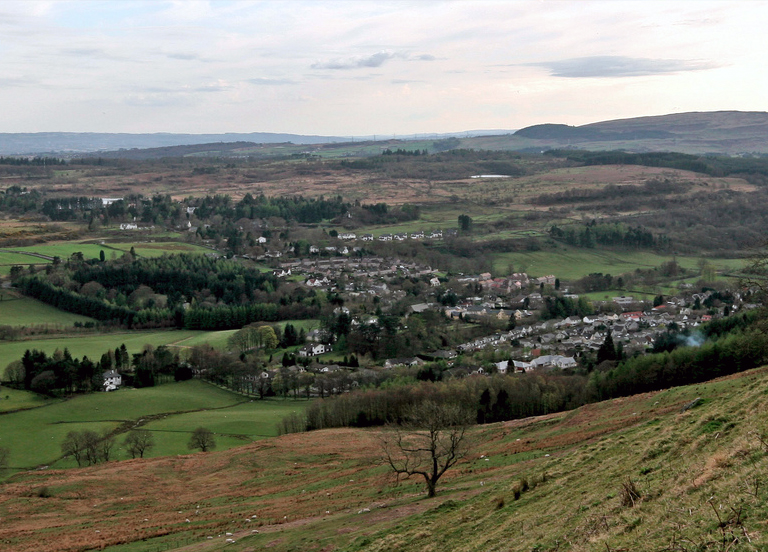
Strathblane in south-west Stirlingshire

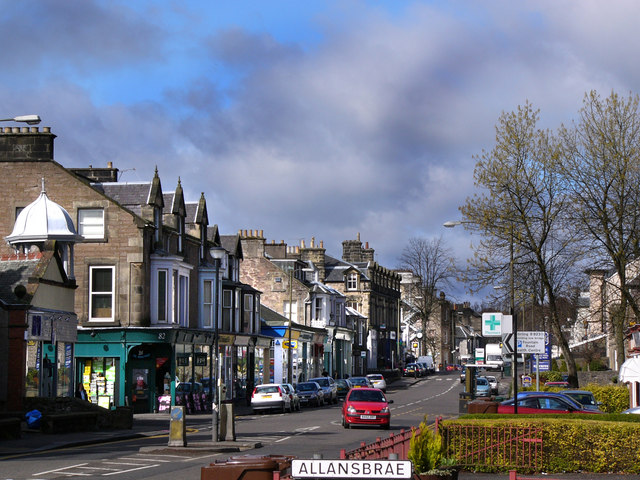
Bridge of Allan in north-east Stirlingshire

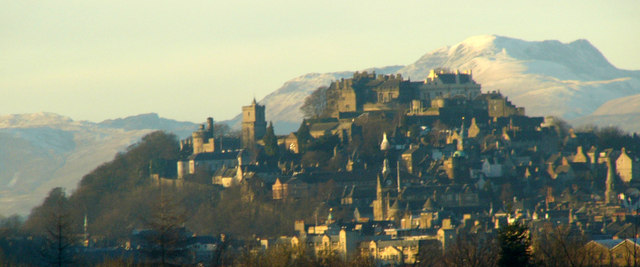
Stirling, the county town

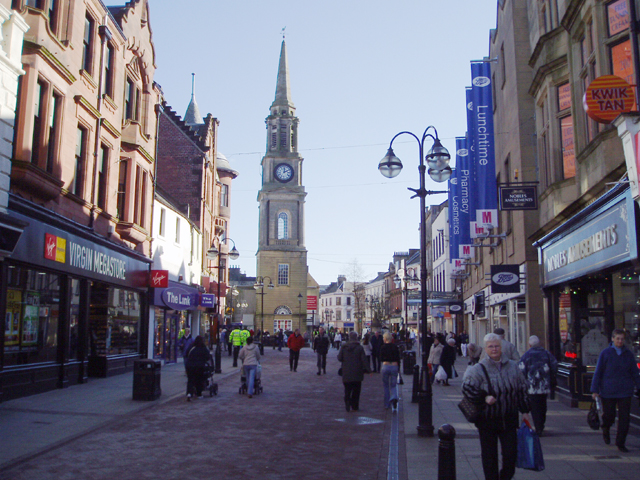
Falkirk town centre

== Parliamentary constituencies ==
Following the Act of Union, Stirlingshire returned members to the House of Commons of the Parliament of the United Kingdom from 1708.

=== 1707–1918 ===
- The Royal Burgh of Stirling formed part of the Stirling burghs constituency along with burghs in Fife and Perthshire.
- The Burgh of Falkirk formed part of Falkirk Burghs, along with burghs in Lanarkshire and Linlithgowshire.
- The remainder of the county returned a single member as the parliamentary county of Stirlingshire. The detached parish of Alva was annexed to the constituency of Clackmannanshire and Kinross by the Representation of the People (Scotland) Act 1832.

=== 1918–1975 ===
In 1918 seats in the House of Commons were redistributed. Stirlingshire was thereafter represented by three members of parliament.

- The burghs of Stirling, Falkirk and Grangemouth formed the Stirling and Falkirk burghs constituency. in 1974 the constituency was renamed Stirling, Falkirk and Grangemouth.
- The eastern part of the county (defined in 1948 and 1970 as the Eastern No. 1, Eastern No. 2 and Eastern No. 3 Districts) was combined with Clackmannanshire to form Clackmannan and East Stirlingshire.
- The remainder of the county was included in the constituency of West Stirlingshire (named Stirling and Clackmannan West until 1945). The area included in the constituency was defined in 1948 and 1970 as the burghs of Bridge of Allan, Denny and Dunipace and Kilsyth; and the Central No. 1, Central No. 2, Western No. 1, Western No. 2 and Western No. 3 districts.

These boundaries continued in use until 1983, when new constituencies were formed based on the Local Government regions and districts created in 1975.

== Notable residents ==
- Michelle Watt, television show host, writer and interior designer.

== Gallery ==
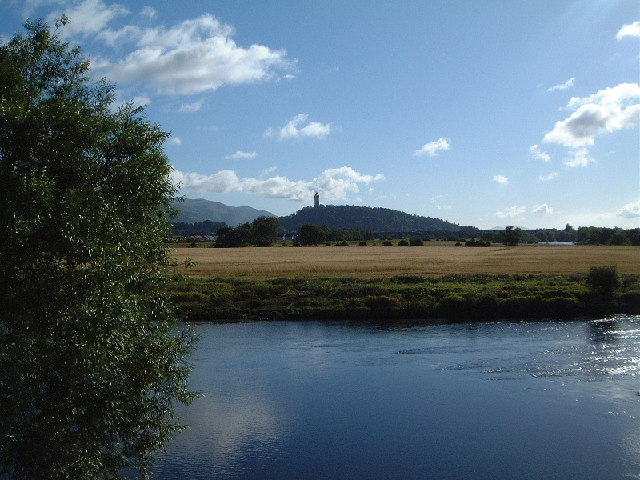
Wallace Monument from Kildean Market

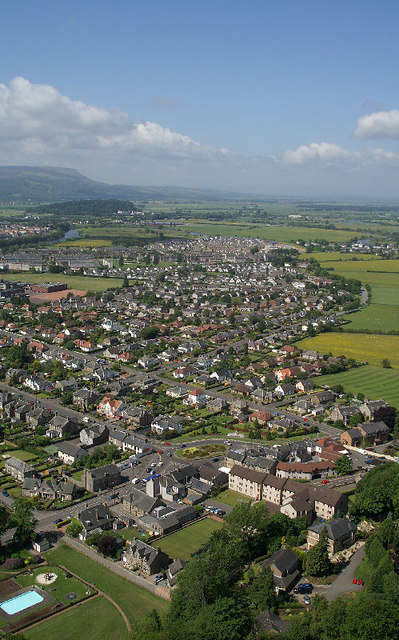
Causewayhead area of Stirling from the Wallace Monument
