= List of places in Falkirk council area =

See the list of places in Scotland for places in other counties.

The article is a list of links for any town, village and hamlet in the Falkirk council area of Scotland.

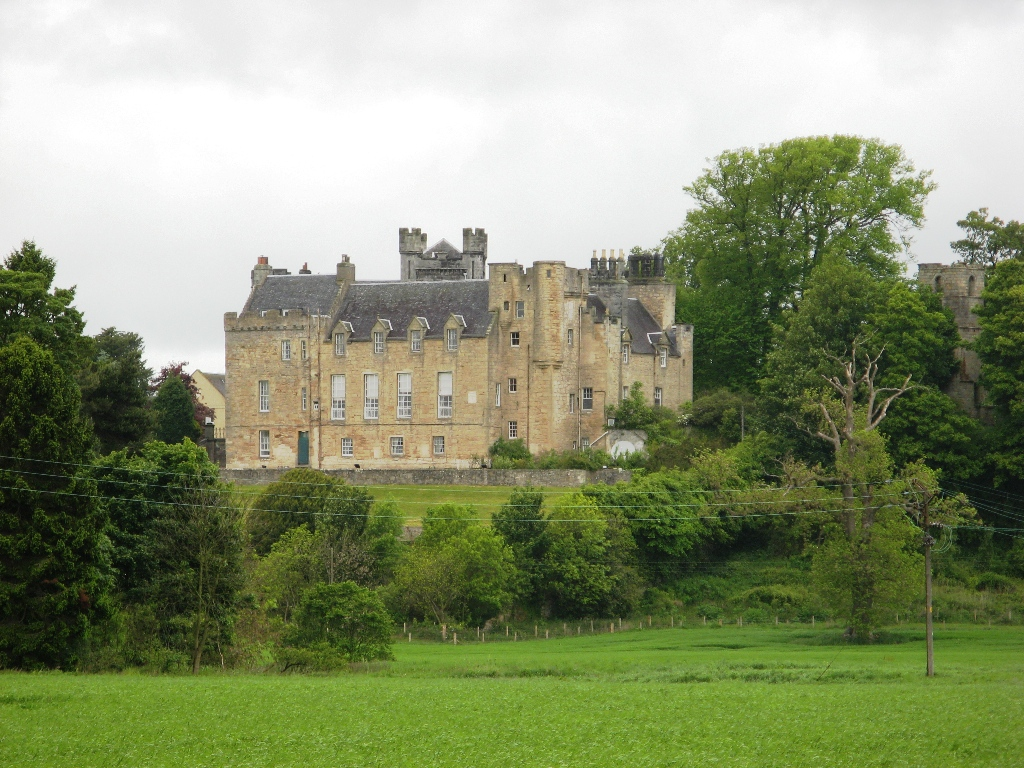
Airth Castle

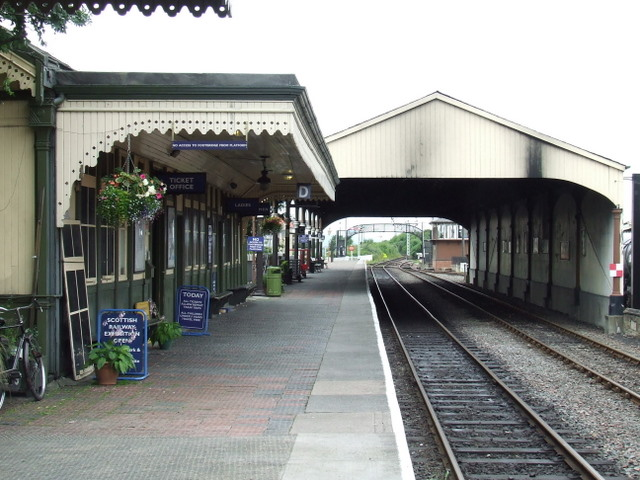
Bo'ness railway station

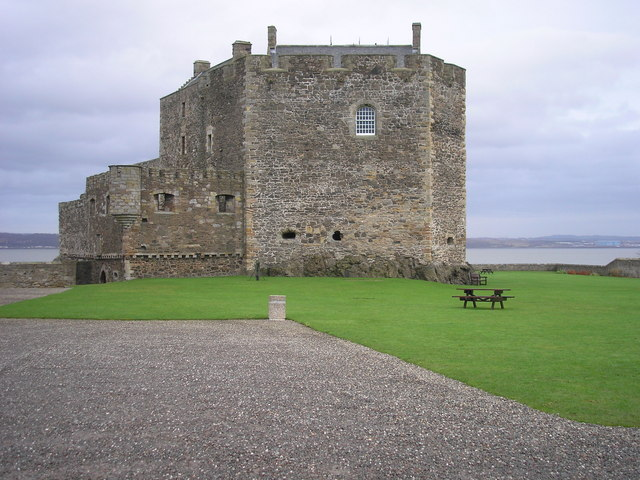
Blackness Castle

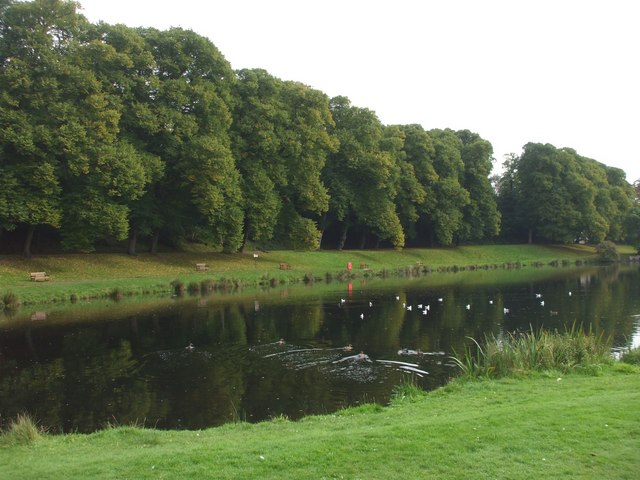
Callendar Park

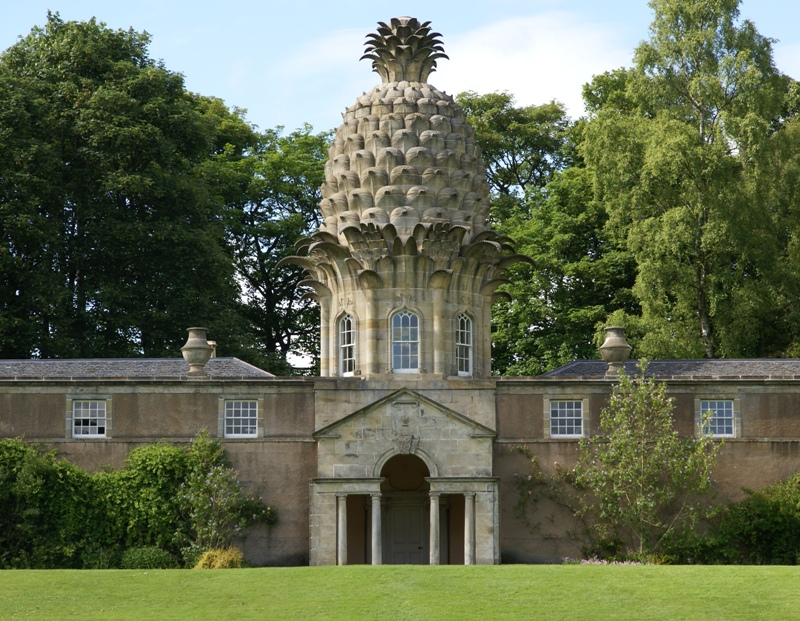
Dunmore Pineapple

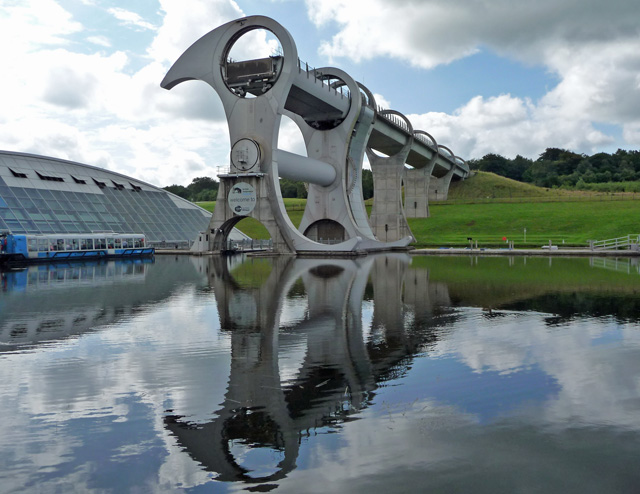
Falkirk Wheel

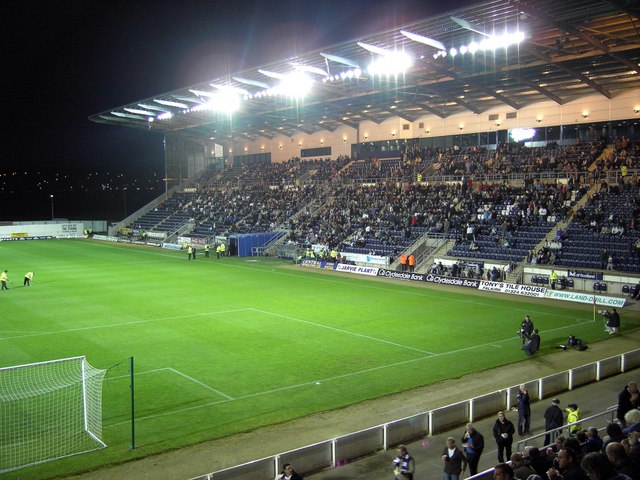
Falkirk Stadium

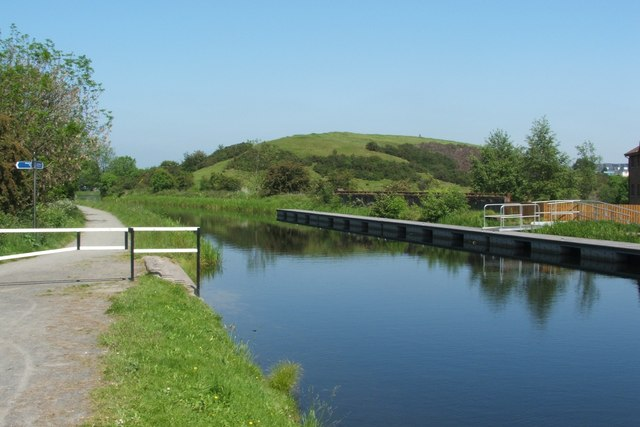
Forth & Clyde Canal

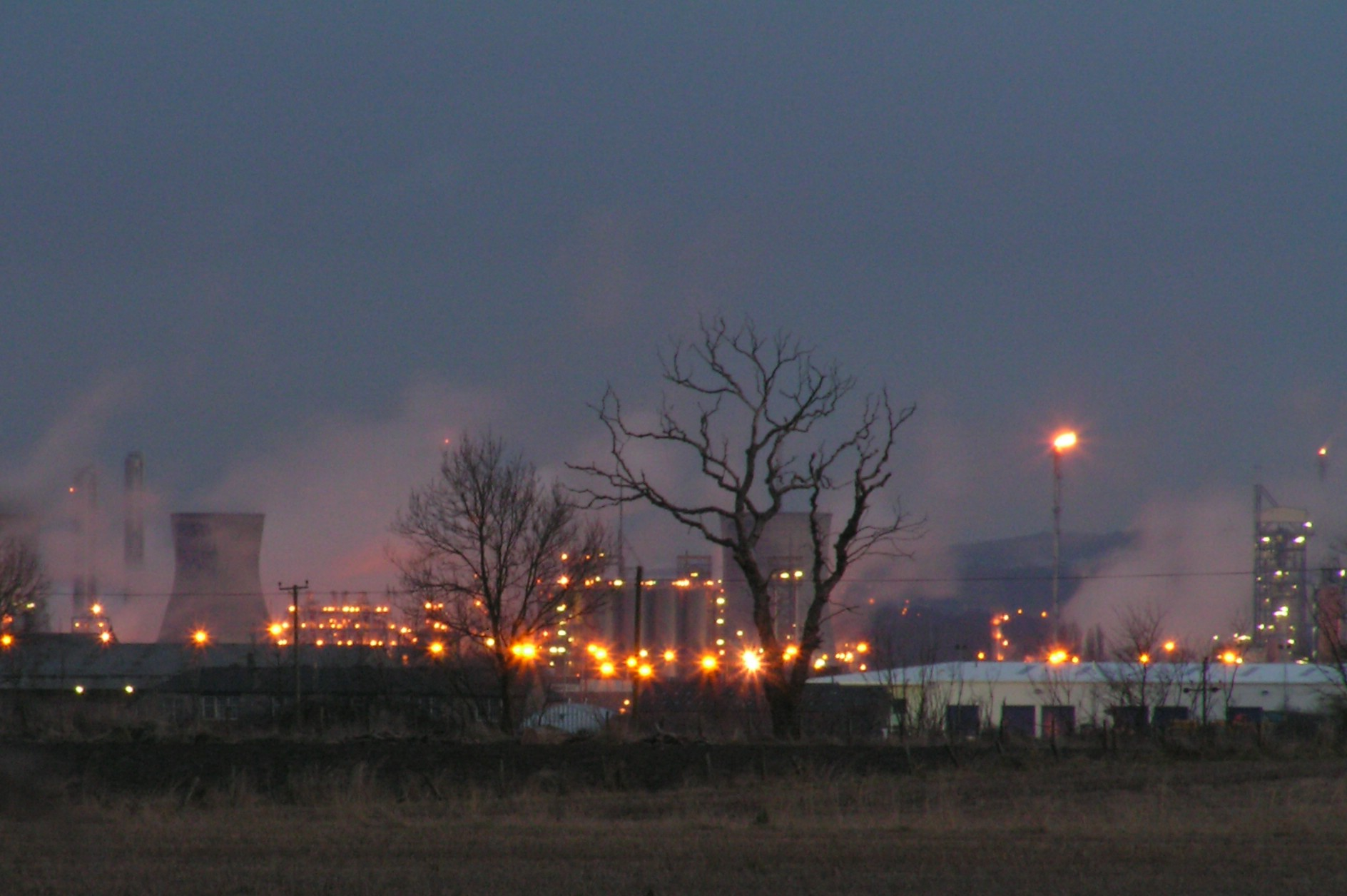
Grangemouth Refinery

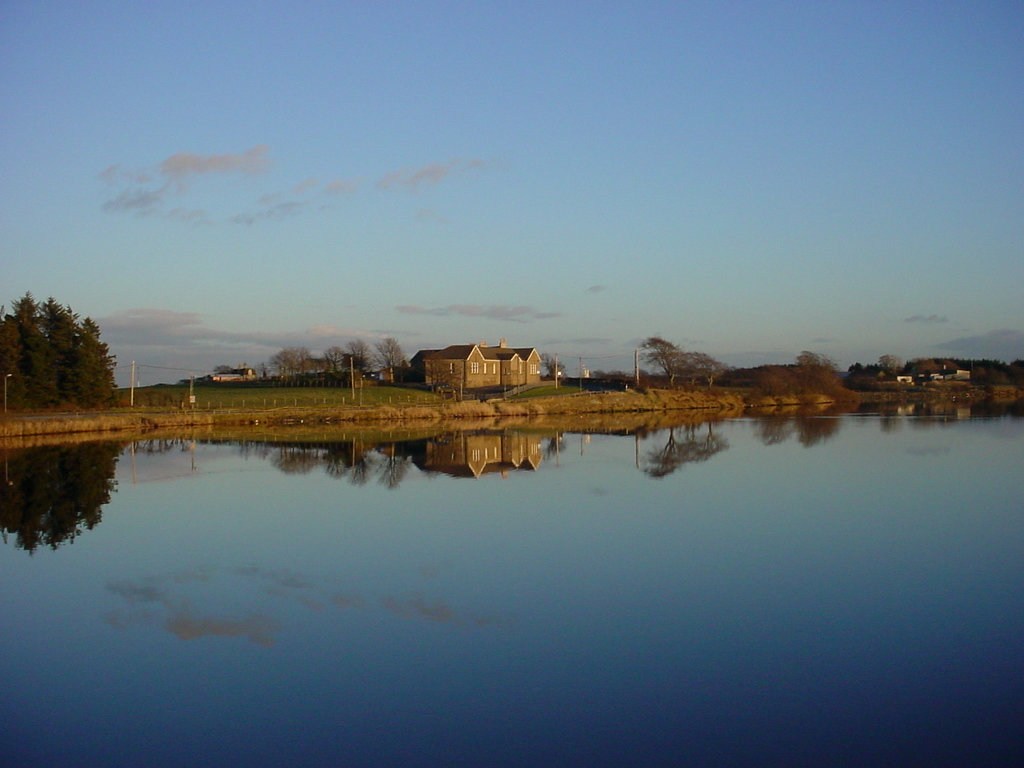
Limerigg, Black Loch

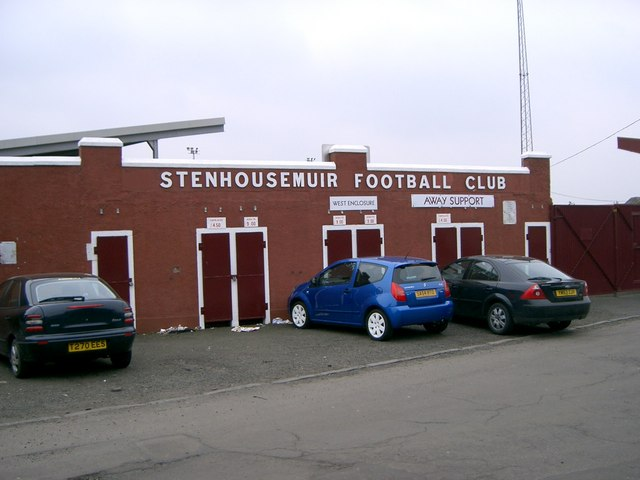
Ochilview Park

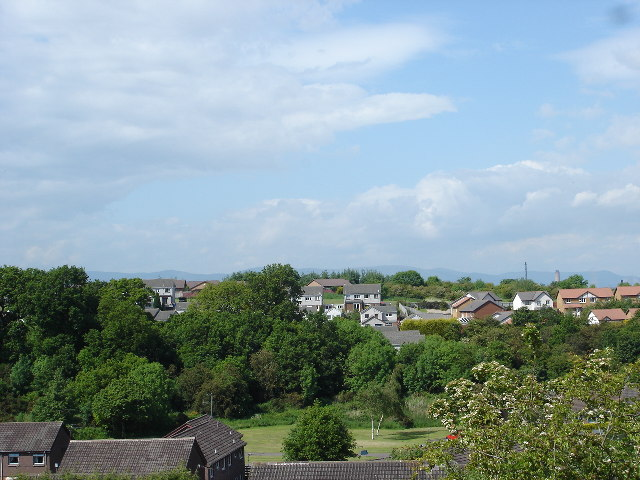
Polmont

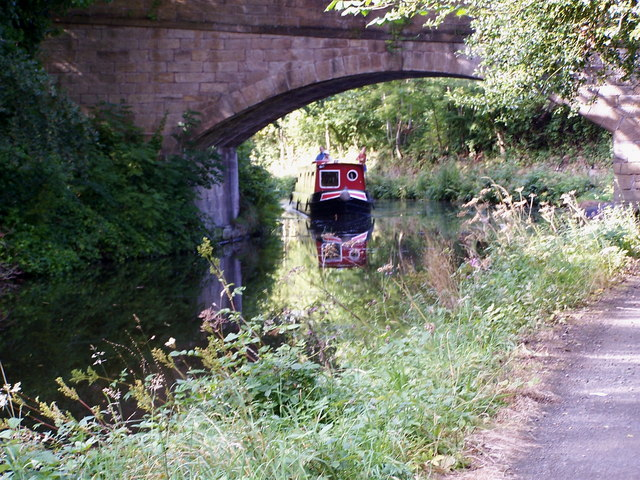
Union Canal

== A ==
- Abbotshaugh Community Woodland
- Airth, Airth Castle
- Allandale
- Antonine Wall
- Avon Gorge
- Avonbridge

== B ==
- Bainsford
- Banknock
- Binniehill
- Birkhill Caverns, Birkhill railway station
- Black Loch
- Blackness, Blackness Castle
- Bo'ness, Bo'ness and Kinneil Railway, Bo'ness Motor Museum, Bo'ness railway station
- Bonny Water
- Bonnybridge
- Braes villages
- Brightons

== C ==
- California
- Callendar House, Callendar Park
- Camelon, Camelon Fort, Camelon railway station
- Carron, Carron Company
- Carronshore
- Castle Cary Castle
- Clackmannanshire Bridge

== D ==
- Denny
- Dennyloanhead
- Dunipace
- Dunmore, Dunmore Pineapple

== E ==
- Elphinstone Tower

== F ==
- Falkirk, Battle of Falkirk, Battle of Falkirk Muir, Falkirk Golf Club, Falkirk Grahamston railway station, Falkirk High railway station, Falkirk Old Parish Church, Falkirk Stadium, Falkirk Steeple, Falkirk Wheel
- Fankerton
- Forth & Clyde Canal

== G ==
- Glen Village
- Glensburgh
- Grangemouth, Grangemouth Docks, Grangemouth Refinery
- Greenhill

== H ==
- Haggs
- Head of Muir
- The Helix
- High Bonnybridge
- Hippodrome Cinema
- Hallglen

== K ==
- Kincardine Bridge
- Kinneil House, Kinneil railway station

== L ==
- Langlees
- Larbert, Larbert railway station
- Laurieston
- Letham
- Limerigg
- Loan
- Longcroft

== M ==
- Maddiston
- Middlefield
- Muirhouses

== O ==
- Ochilview Park

== P ==
- Polmont, HMYOI Polmont, Polmont railway station

== R ==
- Redding
- Reddingmuirhead
- River Avon
- River Carron
- River Forth
- Rough Castle Fort, Rough Castle Tunnel
- Rumford

== S ==
- Shieldhill
- Skinflats
- Slamannan
- South Alloa
- St Andrew's West Church
- Standburn
- Stenhousemuir
- Stoneywood

== T ==
- Tamfourhill
- Torwood, Torwood Castle

== U ==
- Union Canal

== W ==
- Wallacestone
- Westquarter
- Whitecross
- Woodlands

== See also ==
- List of places in Scotland
