= Bothkennar =

Parish in Falkirk, Scotland

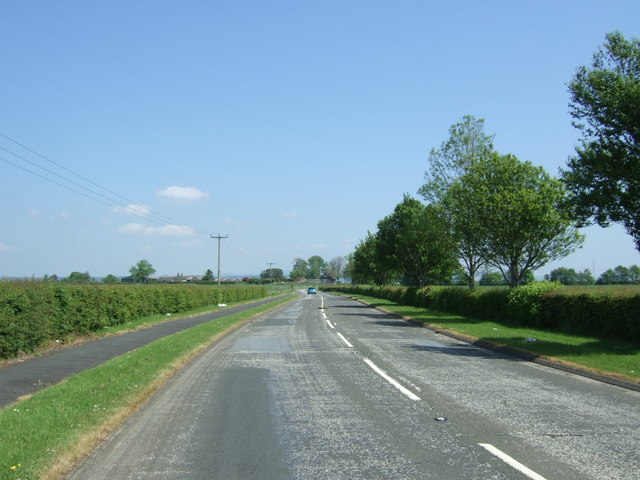

Bothkennar is a quoad sacra parish in the civil parish of Grangemouth in the Falkirk council area of Scotland.

== Topography ==
The parish includes part of Carronshore in the south-west, Skinflats in the south-central area, and part of Grangemouth in the south-east. Most northern parts of the parish are farmland. Bothkennar is part of the Carse of Falkirk.

== Name ==
The name "Bothkennar" comes from Gaelic, meaning a "small arable fen or marsh", according to Rev. John Caw, who was the minister of Bothkennar Church between May 1796 and December 1847.

== Farming and agriculture ==
It is likely the lands have been farmed since before the days of Robert the Bruce. And during the time of the Bruce, wheat was used to pay rent, as is shown in historical records. This means the land must have been farmed at least by that point. However, a common theory is that the area was still marshlands until recent times.

According to the Rev. David Dickson, the majority of the earth in Bothkenner is composed of clay. He says the earth is incredibly substantial, and as of 1797, it allowed the farming of various crops, including "oats, pease, and beans, barley, wheat, grass, and potatoes".

As of 1797, there were 12 orchards in Bothkennar growing apples and pears. As of 1841, the number had risen to 14. It seems the first orchard here was started by the monks of Cambuskenneth Abbey.

== Bothkennar and Carronshore Church ==
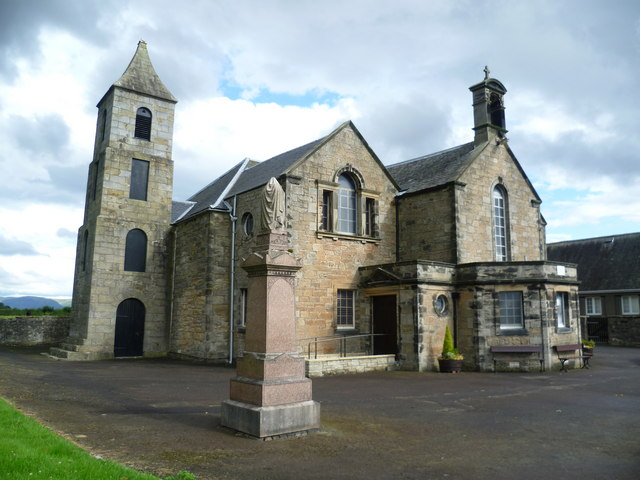
Bothkennar Kirk

Bothkennar and Carronshore Church, previously known as St. Kinnera's Church, as well as Bothkennar Parish Church, is located near the center of the parish lands.

It was built in 1673 and rebuilt in 1789, although there was a church in this area even before that. A steeple was put in place in 1792 and a manse was constructed near the church in 1816. The most recent additions to the main structure were made in 1887 by Sydney Mitchell, and between 1926 and 1928 the hall was constructed by H Wilson.

Stained glass windows in the church include a WWII war memorial depicting Jesus on the cross (crafted by Douglas Hamilton), and two windows by Felix McCullough: the first from around 1965, depicting Jesus holding a cross made of wood; and the second from 1968, depicting Mary carrying the baby Jesus, flanked by a shepherd and a king.

The current church seats up to 530 people and is still used to this day.

The church graveyard has not been open for new burials since 1904.
