= Skinflats =

Coordinates: 56.0274°N 3.7537°W

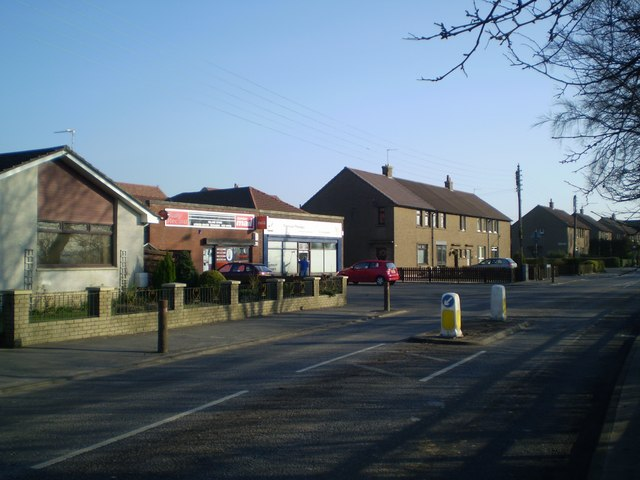
- Main Street, Skinflats

- Location within the Falkirk council area
- Population: 347 (2001 census)
- OS grid reference: NS908831
  - Edinburgh: 22.5 mi (36.2 km) ESE
  - London: 346 mi (557 km) ESE
- Civil parish: Grangemouth
- Council area: Falkirk
- Lieutenancy area: Stirling and Falkirk
- Country: Scotland
- Sovereign state: United Kingdom
- Post town: FALKIRK
- Postcode district: FK2
- Dialling code: 01324
- Police: Scotland
- Fire: Scottish
- Ambulance: Scottish
- UK Parliament: Falkirk
- Scottish Parliament: Falkirk East
- Website: falkirk.gov.uk

Skinflats is a small village in the Falkirk council area of Scotland. It is located 1.5 miles (2.4 km) north-west of Grangemouth, 1.1 miles (1.8 km) east of Carronshore and 2.3 miles (3.7 km) north-east of Falkirk. It lies on the A905 road between Glensburgh and Airth, near to the River Carron and the point where it flows into the Firth of Forth.

The United Kingdom 2001 census reported the population as 347, almost unchanged since 1991.

The name of the village is sometimes claimed to be of Dutch origin, supposedly bestowed by Dutch engineers working on land reclamation in the 17th century, but there is no evidence that any such reclamation projects took place in the parish of Bothkennar where Skinflats is located and the place-name is readily explained as Scots in origin, meaning "short flat".

Skinflats was originally a pit village, but no mining has taken place there for many years.

There is an RSPB Nature Reserve at Skinflats which protects saline lagoons and saltmarsh, both types of habitat being increasingly rare in the Forth Estuary. A project was established to increase the extent of these habitats at Skinflats and following years of discussion planning for the project started in 2018 and on Wednesday 3 October 2018 the seawall at the reserve was breached and the project to realign the coast at Skinflats was completed. In 2018 the first recorded successful breeding of pied avocets in Scotland occurred at Skinflats.

The bus service F23 used to connect Skinflats with Falkirk and Stenhousemuir but the local authority deemed it too costly and proposed the cancellation of the service in April 2019.

== See also ==
- List of places in Falkirk council area
