= Danny Malloy =

Danny Malloy is the name of:

- Danny Malloy (footballer) (1930–2015), Scottish former footballer and manager
- Danny Malloy (boxer) (1929–2020), former boxer and footballer

== See also ==
- Daniel Molloy, fictional character
- Dannel Malloy (born 1955), former Governor of Connecticut
