= Danny Malloy (boxer) =

Scottish footballer (1929–2020)

Personal information
- Nationality: Scottish
- Born: Daniel Malloy; 9 February 1929 Denny, Falkirk, Scotland
- Died: 2 October 2020 (aged 91) Denny, Falkirk, Scotland
- Weight: Welterweight

Boxing career
- Stance: Orthodox

Boxing record
- Total fights: 20
- Wins: 12
- Win by KO: 5
- Losses: 8
- Draws: 0
- No contests: 0

Daniel Malloy (9 February 1929 – 2 October 2020) was a Scottish professional boxer and footballer. He was best known for winning the BBBofC Scottish Area Welterweight Championship by defeating Willie Whyte on 3 October 1953 at King's Hall, Belfast, United Kingdom. He also played for Stenhousemuir in the Scottish Football League.

== Personal life ==
Malloy was born in Stripside, Denny, Falkirk and is the eldest of the five children to Thomas Malloy (1907–1959) and Helen Jane Wilson (1908–2013). Malloy's siblings and mother soon immigrated to Canada in the early 1960s resulting in Danny being the only one who stayed in Scotland.

He married Elizabeth (née McCulloch) on 22 May 1953 and they had three children. Malloy also has four grandchildren. He lived in Haggs, a village near Bonnybridge but later resided back in Denny. His cousin is also named Danny Malloy who was also a professional footballer.

In March 2011, Malloy was honoured by Falkirk Council after receiving a street named after him in Denny which was called "Malloy Court". The honour was for his contribution to sport.

On 7 February 2013, his wife Elizabeth died at the age of 83.

On 2 October 2020, Malloy died peacefully at home due to a long illness.
