= High Bonnybridge =

Coordinates: 55.994°N 03.877°W

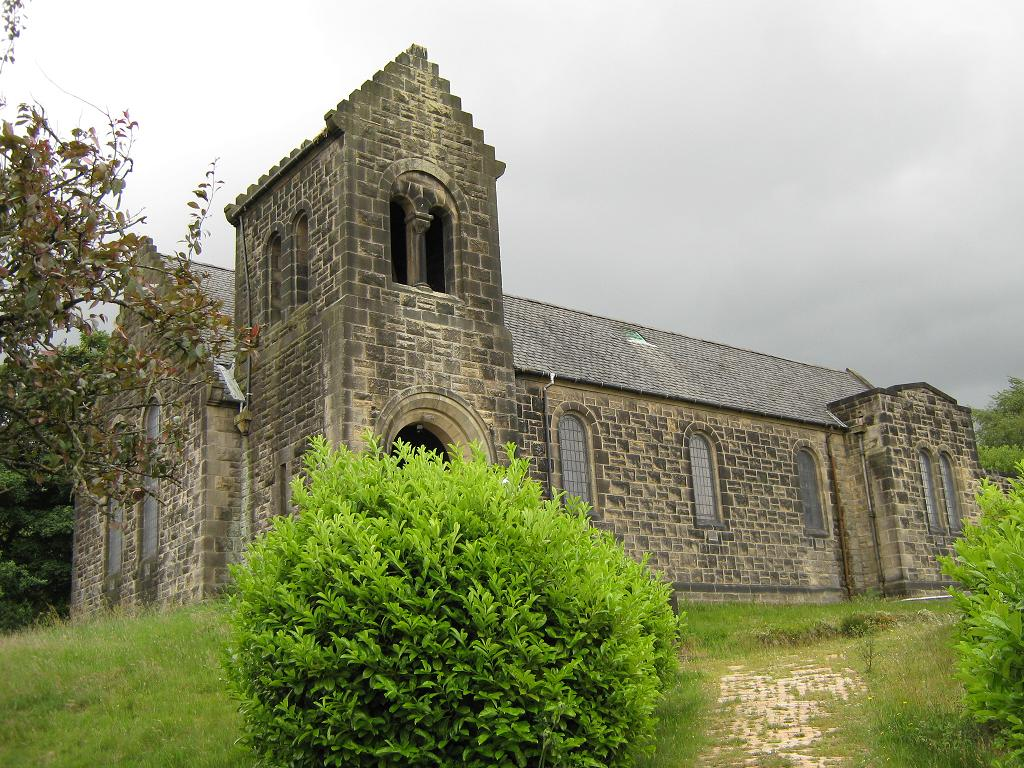
- The unoccupied High Bonnybridge Baptist Church

- Location within the Falkirk council area
- Population: 590 (2020)
- OS grid reference: NS830794
  - Edinburgh: 26.8 mi (43.1 km) ESE
  - London: 346 mi (557 km) SSE
- Civil parish: Falkirk
- Council area: Falkirk
- Lieutenancy area: Stirling and Falkirk
- Country: Scotland
- Sovereign state: United Kingdom
- Post town: BONNYBRIDGE
- Postcode district: FK4
- Dialling code: 01324
- Police: Scotland
- Fire: Scottish
- Ambulance: Scottish
- UK Parliament: Falkirk
- Scottish Parliament: Falkirk West
- Website: falkirk.gov.uk

High Bonnybridge is a small village which lies in the Falkirk council area of Scotland. The village is located 0.5 miles (0.8 km) south-east of Bonnybridge and 3.6 miles (5.8 km) west-southwest of Falkirk. High Bonnybridge sits north of the main Glasgow to Edinburgh via Falkirk railway line.

At the time of the 2001 census the village had a population of 610 residents.
