= Glen Village =

Coordinates: 55°59′10″N 3°47′10″W

Glen Village: Scottish Gaelic: Clachan a' Ghlinne
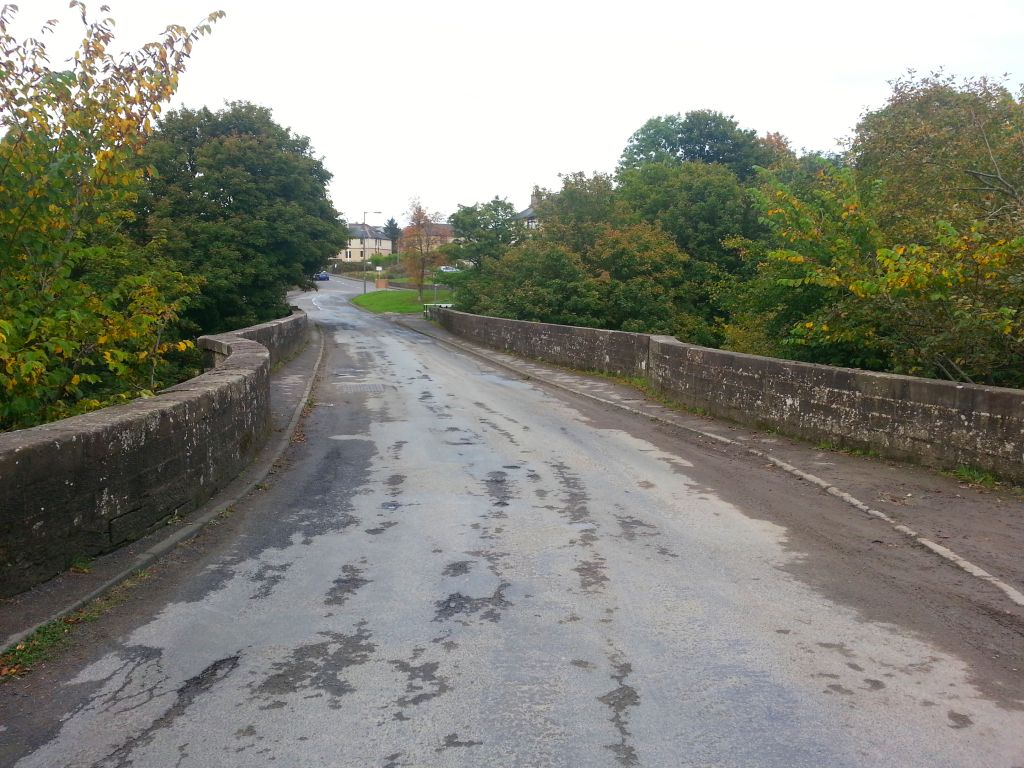
- Stone bridge over the Union Canal to the south of Glen Village

- Location within the Falkirk council area
- Population: 3,080 (2020)
- OS grid reference: NS886784
  - Edinburgh: 23.2 mi (37.3 km) ESE
  - London: 344 mi (554 km) SSE
- Civil parish: Falkirk
- Council area: Falkirk
- Lieutenancy area: Stirling and Falkirk
- Country: Scotland
- Sovereign state: United Kingdom
- Post town: Falkirk
- Postcode district: FK1 2
- Dialling code: 01324
- Police: Scotland
- Fire: Scottish
- Ambulance: Scottish
- UK Parliament: Falkirk
- Scottish Parliament: Falkirk West

Glen Village is a settlement in the Falkirk council area of Scotland, situated at the southern end of Callendar Park, and around 1 mile (1.6 km) south of Falkirk town centre. It adjoins the housing estate of Hallglen, with the two localities counted together in most official statistics.

== Description ==
Around 1 mile (1.6 km) south from Falkirk town centre and about 1/4 mile (0.40 km) from Falkirk High railway station, Glen Village is a small settlement containing around 180 cottage flat homes built in the 1930s for workers at nearby coal mines. These homes replaced an older community of outdated miners rows from the latter part of the 19th century, and the mines themselves closed by the 1960s. Falkirk was originally isolated, but nowadays it adjoins the larger housing estate of Hallglen, which was constructed in the early 1970s on an incline between the Callendar Park wooded estate and the railway. Hallglen is where most local amenities are situated (except the local primary school which is on the Glen Village side of the main road, being connected to the majority of local housing by a pedestrian footbridge). The village formerly held a community hall, post office and a bowling club, but all have now closed. Both the Glen and Hallglen names appear on the Timothy Pont's Blaeu map of the area surveyed in the 1590s.

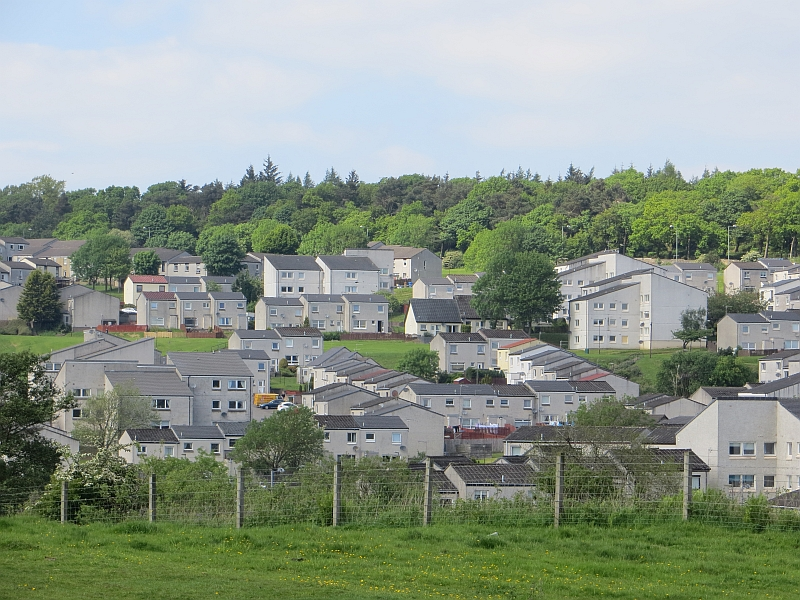
View of Hallglen housing from the south

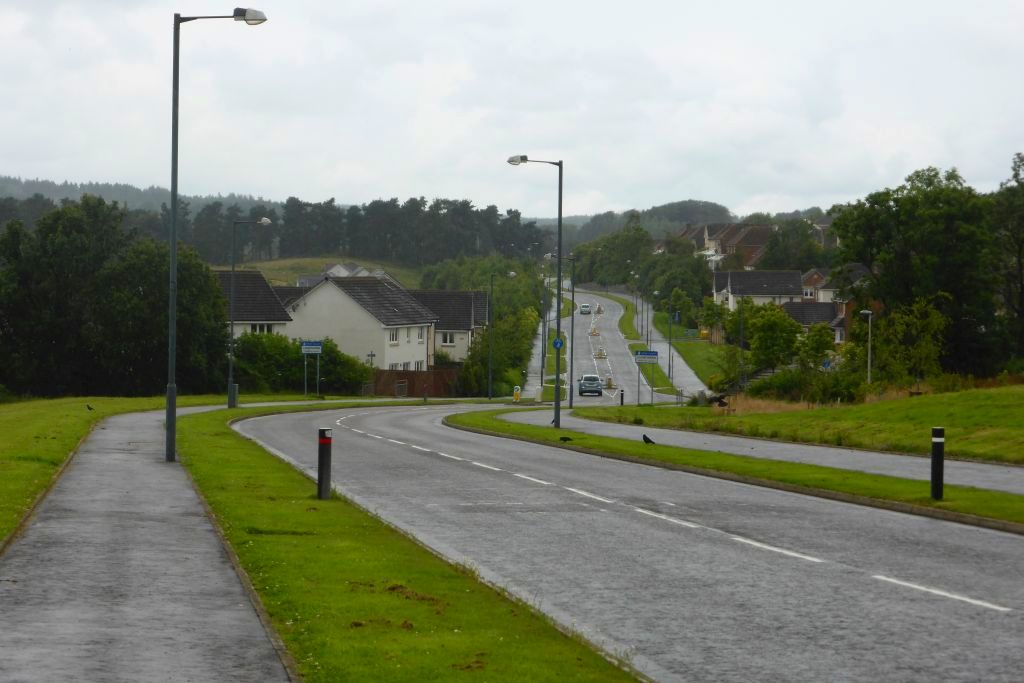
Looking west from Glen Village towards new housing at Lionthorn

To the west, the building of the Lionthorn private housing development in the early 21st century, which in turn adjoins the older Lochgreen neighbourhood, has created a near-continuous suburban chain between Glen Village and the southern part of Falkirk proper around Falkirk High Station, also with a population of around 3,000. Similarly, the open fields to the east of Hallglen almost connect with a cluster of newbuilds on the periphery of Redding, although historically the communities were 2 miles (3.2 km) apart.

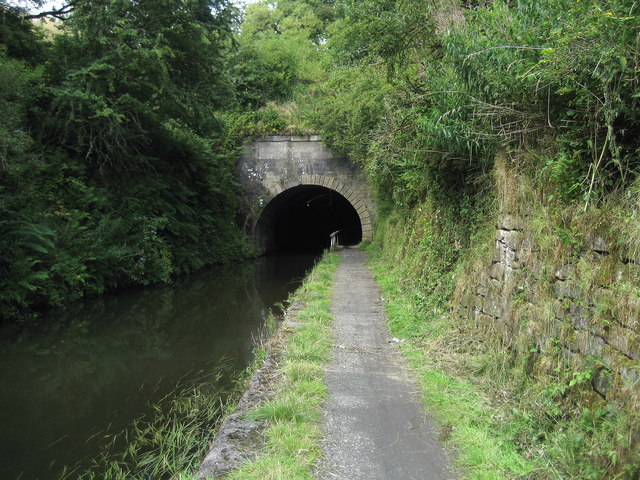
Entrance to the Union Canal's 'Dark Tunnel'

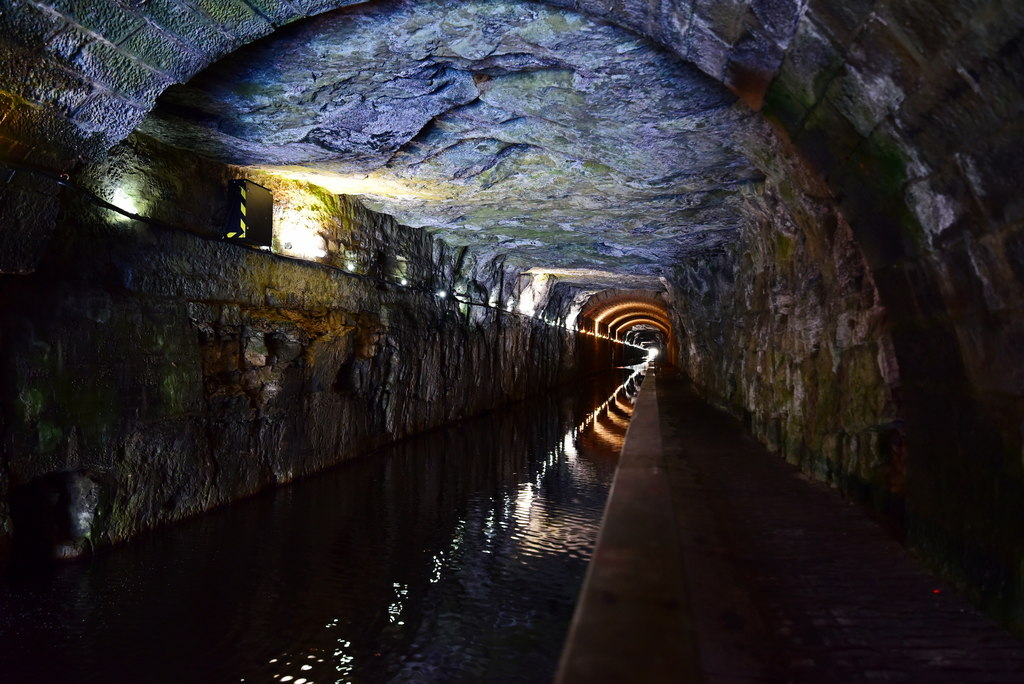
Inside the tunnel

Adjacent to the village is the Union Canal where there is the 690-yard-long (630 m) Falkirk Tunnel which was completed in 1821, it is known locally as the "Dark Tunnel". The Glasgow–Edinburgh via Falkirk line railway runs through the Hallglen Railway Tunnel which is of similar length and age – built 1842 and 845 yards (773 m) long – as it passes Glen Village, emerging at Hallglen. Both were constructed as William Forbes Sr and Jr, the powerful successive owners of nearby Callendar House, did not want the canal or the railway to spoil their views of the landscape. In the 2001 UK census, Glen Village and Hallglen were recorded as having a combined population of 3,488 residents.

== Sport ==
Many local amateur football clubs have come from the area, including the Hallglen Hoofters and the former Chequers team who played their home matches at Glen Park.

== See also ==
- List of places in Falkirk council area
