= Cowie, Stirling =

Coordinates: 56.0805°N 3.867°W

Cowie: Scottish Gaelic: Collaidh
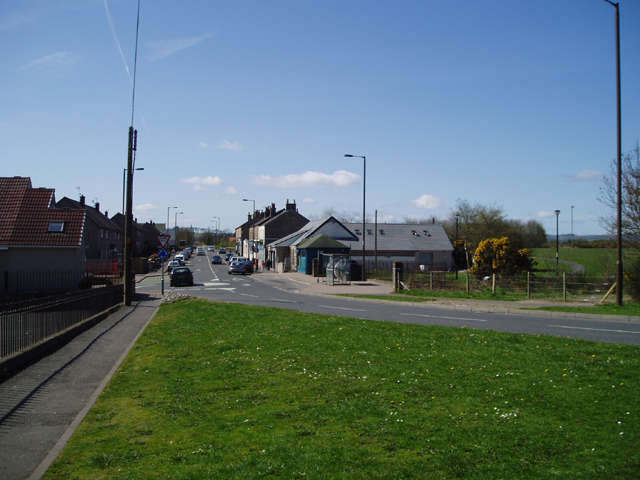
- The main road through Cowie

- Location within the Stirling council area
- Population: 2,720 (2020)
- OS grid reference: NS838890
- Civil parish: St. Ninians
- Council area: Stirling
- Lieutenancy area: Stirling and Falkirk
- Country: Scotland
- Sovereign state: United Kingdom
- Post town: Stirling
- Postcode district: FK7
- Dialling code: 01786
- Police: Scotland
- Fire: Scottish
- Ambulance: Scottish
- UK Parliament: Stirling and Strathallan
- Scottish Parliament: Stirling

Cowie (Scottish Gaelic: Collaidh, meaning wooded place) is a village in the Stirling council area of Scotland. Historically part of Stirlingshire, it lies on the minor B9124 road approximately 4 miles (6 kilometres) southeast of Stirling and about 1 mile (1.5 kilometres) north of the A9 road. The United Kingdom Census 2011 recorded the population as 2,713.

== History ==
Excavations have identified Mesolithic and Neolithic settlement remains at Chapelfield.

2 kilometres (1.2 miles) east of Cowie at the Castleton farm is a number of Cup and Ring markings on a rock outcrop dated to around between 2000 and 5000 years BP.

Cowie was formerly a pit village and stone quarrying was carried on in the surrounds. It is now the site of a factory manufacturing engineered wood products and other light industries.

Recent years have seen significant new housing developments in the village for commuters.

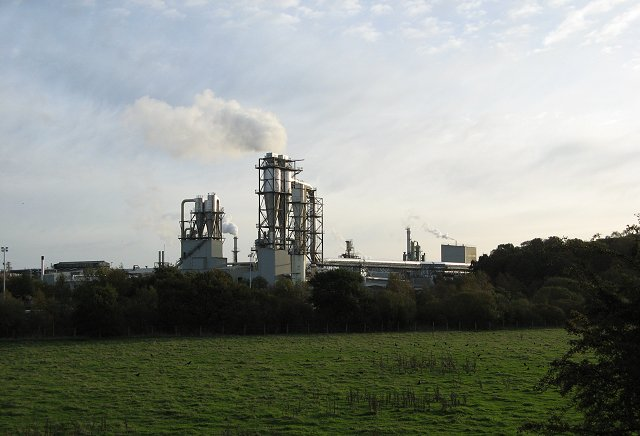
The "Caberboard" fibreboard factory in Cowie
