= Stoneywood, Falkirk =

Coordinates: 56.023°N 03.929°W

Stoneywood: Scots: Stanywid
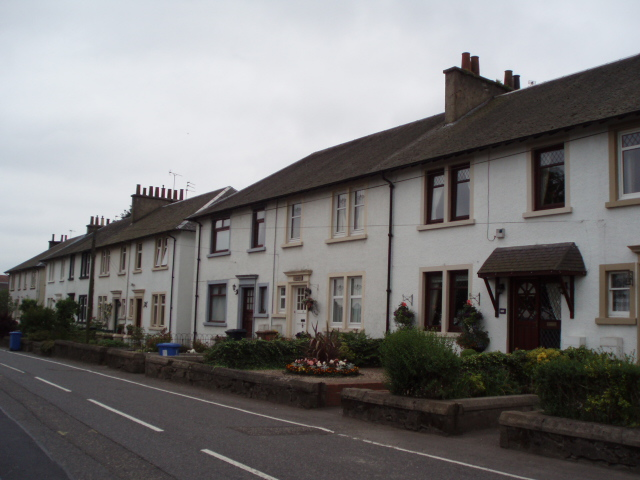
- A row of houses on Stoneywood Park, the main road through Stoneywood

- Location within the Falkirk council area
- Population: 288 (2001 census)
- OS grid reference: NS798828
  - Edinburgh: 29.0 mi (46.7 km) ESE
  - London: 349 mi (562 km) SSE
- Civil parish: Denny
- Council area: Falkirk
- Lieutenancy area: Stirling and Falkirk
- Country: Scotland
- Sovereign state: United Kingdom
- Post town: DENNY
- Postcode district: FK6
- Dialling code: 01324
- Police: Scotland
- Fire: Scottish
- Ambulance: Scottish
- UK Parliament: Falkirk
- Scottish Parliament: Falkirk West
- Website: falkirk.gov.uk

Stoneywood is a small village which lies in the Falkirk council area of Scotland. The village is located 0.1 miles (0.2 km) west of Denny and 7.3 miles (11.7 km) west-northwest of Falkirk.

The village is located south of the River Carron along the B818 road on the outskirts of the town of Denny. At the time of the 2001 census the village had a population of 288 residents.
