= Greenhill, Falkirk =

Village in Falkirk, Scotland

Coordinates: 55.992°N 3.891°W

Greenhill: Scottish Gaelic: An Cnoc Gorm
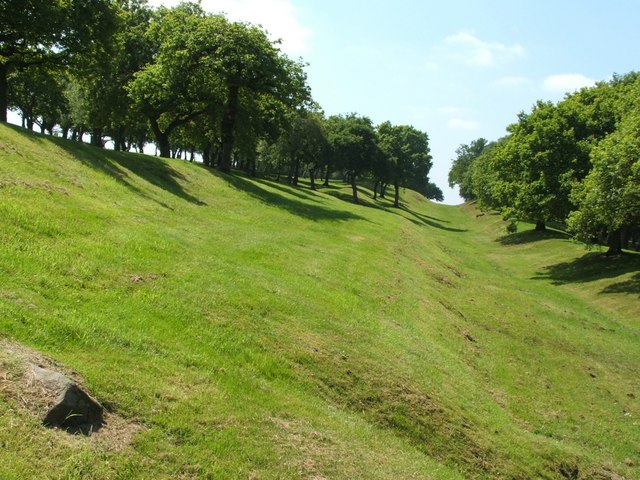
- Antonine Wall at Seabegs Wood, Greenhill

- Location within the Falkirk council area
- Population: 2,300 (2020)
- OS grid reference: NS821791
  - Edinburgh: 27.4 mi (44.1 km) ESE
  - London: 346 mi (557 km) SSE
- Civil parish: Falkirk
- Council area: Falkirk
- Lieutenancy area: Stirling and Falkirk
- Country: Scotland
- Sovereign state: United Kingdom
- Post town: BONNYBRIDGE
- Postcode district: FK4
- Dialling code: 01324
- Police: Scotland
- Fire: Scottish
- Ambulance: Scottish
- UK Parliament: Falkirk
- Scottish Parliament: Falkirk West

Greenhill is a village which lies in the Falkirk council area of Scotland. The village is located on the outskirts of Bonnybridge, 4.3 miles (6.9 km) west of Falkirk. Greenhill is situated south of the Forth and Clyde Canal and north of the railway line at Greenhill Junction.

According to the 2001 census the village has 1,265 residents.
