= Ardchyle =

Coordinates: 56.431°N 04.391°W

Ardchyle: Scottish Gaelic: Àrd Choille
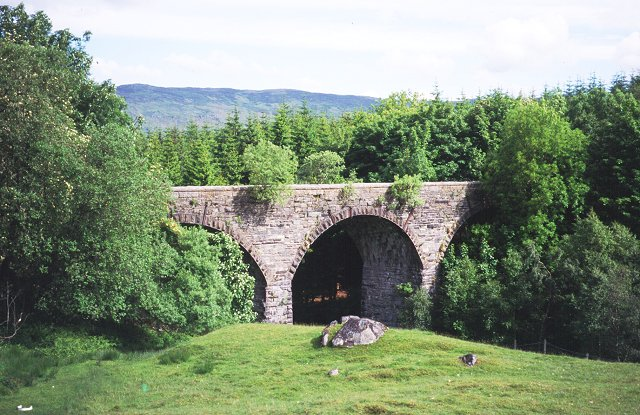
- Glendhu viaduct, south of Ardchyle

- Location within the Stirling council area
- OS grid reference: NN525290
- Civil parish: Killin
- Council area: Stirling
- Country: Scotland
- Sovereign state: United Kingdom
- Post town: KILLIN
- Postcode district: FK21
- Dialling code: 01567
- Police: Scotland
- Fire: Scottish
- Ambulance: Scottish
- UK Parliament: Stirling and Strathallan
- Scottish Parliament: Stirling

Ardchyle is a small hamlet in Stirling, Scotland. The Glendhu viaduct, just south of Ardchyle, was built for the now disused section of the Callander and Oban Railway which closed in 1965 after a landslide.
