= Ardchullarie More =

Coordinates: 56.294°N 04.289°W

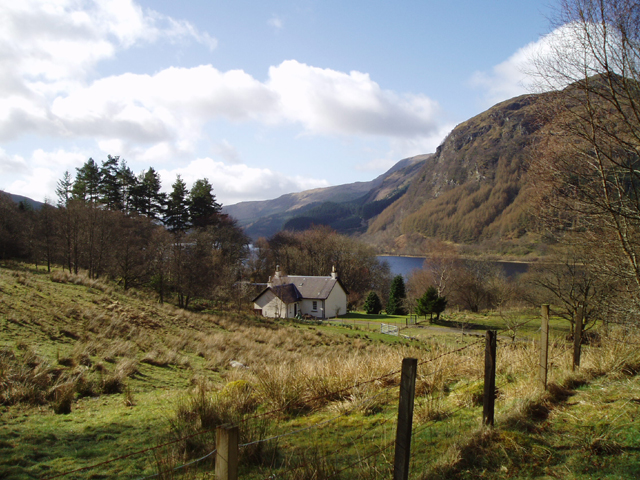
- A farmhouse at Ardchullarie More. The craggy hillside on the other side of the Loch belongs to Ardnandave Hill.

- Location within the Stirling council area
- OS grid reference: NN583136
- Civil parish: Callander
- Council area: Stirling
- Country: Scotland
- Sovereign state: United Kingdom
- Post town: CALLANDER
- Postcode district: FK18
- Dialling code: 01877
- Police: Scotland
- Fire: Scottish
- Ambulance: Scottish
- UK Parliament: Stirling and Strathallan
- Scottish Parliament: Stirling

Ardchullarie More is a small hamlet in the Stirling council area, Scotland and is situated on the eastern side of Loch Lubnaig.
