= Longcroft, Falkirk =

Coordinates: 55.9918°N 3.9325°W

Longcroft: Scots: Langcraft
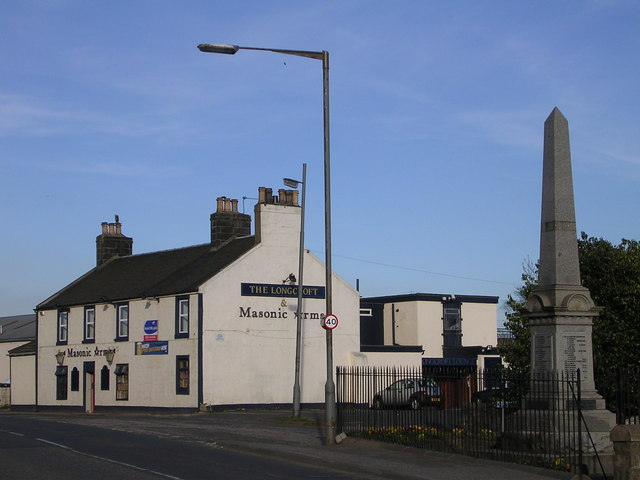
- Masonic Arms and the war memorial at Longcroft

- Location within the Falkirk council area
- Population: 330 (2001 census)
- OS grid reference: NS795793
  - Edinburgh: 28.9 mi (46.5 km) SE
  - London: 346 mi (557 km) SSE
- Civil parish: Denny
- Council area: Falkirk
- Lieutenancy area: Stirling and Falkirk
- Country: Scotland
- Sovereign state: United Kingdom
- Post town: BONNYBRIDGE
- Postcode district: FK4
- Dialling code: 01324
- Police: Scotland
- Fire: Scottish
- Ambulance: Scottish
- UK Parliament: Falkirk
- Scottish Parliament: Falkirk West

Longcroft is a small village in the Falkirk council area in Scotland. The village is located 5.7 miles (9.2 km) west-southwest of Falkirk along a stretch of the A803 road between Haggs and Dennyloanhead. The main features of the village include the Mango restaurant and hotel (formerly the Masonic Arms pub and hotel) and the Cotton House restaurant.

== Notable former residents ==
- Thomas Ferguson, footballer (Falkirk)
- Danny Malloy, footballer (Dundee, Cardiff City, Doncaster)
