= Head of Muir =

Coordinates: 56.008°N 3.907°W

Head of Muir: Scottish Gaelic: Ceann a' Mhonaidh
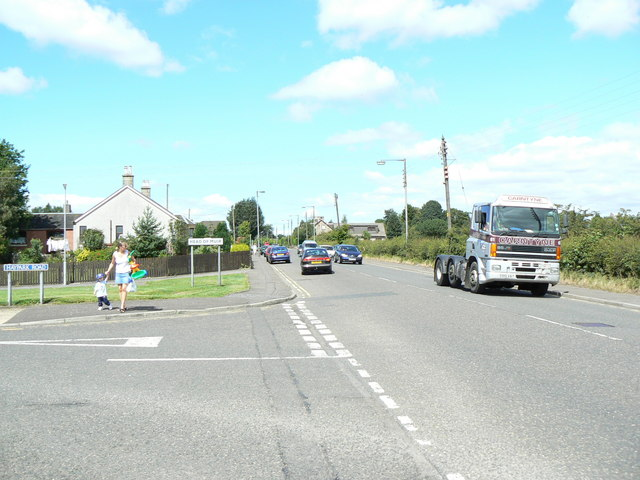
- Looking north along the main street of the village that used to be called Muirhead.

- Location within the Falkirk council area
- Population: 1,660 (2020)
- OS grid reference: NS811810
- Civil parish: Denny
- Council area: Falkirk
- Country: Scotland
- Sovereign state: United Kingdom
- Post town: DENNY
- Postcode district: FK6
- Dialling code: 01324
- Police: Scotland
- Fire: Scottish
- Ambulance: Scottish
- UK Parliament: Falkirk
- Scottish Parliament: Falkirk West

Head of Muir is a village located in the Falkirk council area, Central Scotland, between Denny and Dennyloanhead.

Its local primary school is Head of Muir primary school.

Local amenities include a small shop operated by Scotmid and a butcher's shop called Corkhills.
