= Haggs =

Coordinates: 55.9898°N 3.9392°W

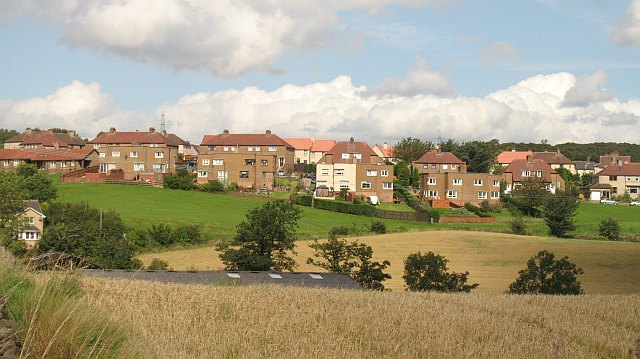
- The village of Haggs

- Location within the Falkirk council area
- Area: 0.14 sq mi (0.36 km^{2})
- Population: 990 (2020)
  - Density: 7,071/sq mi (2,730/km^{2})
- OS grid reference: NS791791
  - Edinburgh: 29.2 mi (47.0 km) ESE
  - London: 347 mi (558 km) SSE
- Civil parish: Denny
- Council area: Falkirk
- Lieutenancy area: Stirling and Falkirk
- Country: Scotland
- Sovereign state: United Kingdom
- Post town: BONNYBRIDGE
- Postcode district: FK4
- Dialling code: 01324
- UK Parliament: Falkirk
- Scottish Parliament: Falkirk West
- Website: falkirk.gov.uk

Haggs is a small village in the Falkirk council area of Scotland. The village is situated 2.1 miles (3.4 km) south-west of Bonnybridge, 4.6 miles (7.4 km) north-northeast of Kilsyth and 2.0 miles (3.2 km) south-southwest of Denny, on the east side of the M80 motorway which separates it from Banknock.

At the 2001 census the population of Haggs was reported as 383 residents.

Haggs lies along the A803 road between Banknock and Dennyloanhead and is next to the location where the A80 road formerly turned into the M80 motorway.

Haggs Parish Church is shared with Banknock and often hosts the local school during religious holidays like Easter and Christmas.

== Notable people ==
- Danny Malloy - former professional boxer and footballer.

== See also ==
- List of places in Falkirk council area
