= Letham, Falkirk =

Coordinates: 56.0513°N 3.7741°W

Letham: Scottish Gaelic: Leathann
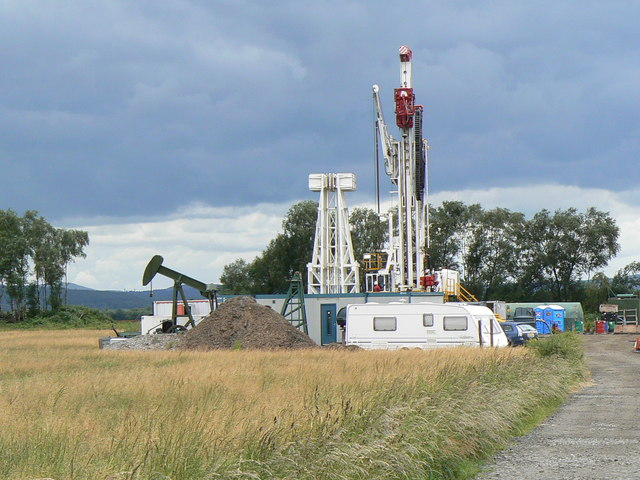
- This site, complete with nodding donkey, is believed to be related to the extraction of underground methane deposits at Letham

- Location within the Falkirk council area
- OS grid reference: NS895856
- Civil parish: Airth
- Council area: Falkirk
- Country: Scotland
- Sovereign state: United Kingdom
- Post town: FALKIRK
- Postcode district: FK2
- Dialling code: 01324
- Police: Scotland
- Fire: Scottish
- Ambulance: Scottish
- UK Parliament: Falkirk
- Scottish Parliament: Falkirk East

Letham (Scottish Gaelic: Leathann) is a small former mining village in Falkirk district, Scotland. It is located less than 2 miles from the town of Airth.
