= Carron, Falkirk =

Village in Scotland

Coordinates: 56.0238°N 3.7896°W

Carron: Scottish Gaelic: Carrann
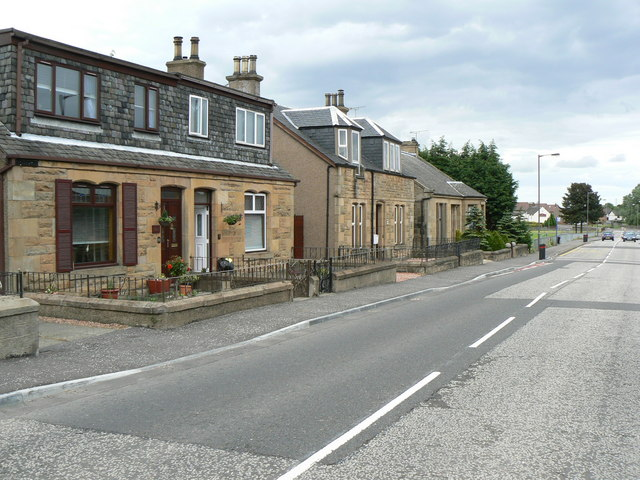
- Carronshore Road, Carron

- Location within the Falkirk council area
- Population: 2,380 (2020)
- OS grid reference: NS885826
  - Edinburgh: 24.0 mi (38.6 km) ESE
  - London: 347 mi (558 km) SSE
- Civil parish: Larbert
- Council area: Falkirk
- Lieutenancy area: Stirling and Falkirk
- Country: Scotland
- Sovereign state: United Kingdom
- Post town: Falkirk
- Postcode district: FK2
- Dialling code: 01324
- Police: Scotland
- Fire: Scottish
- Ambulance: Scottish
- UK Parliament: Falkirk
- Scottish Parliament: Falkirk East
- Website: Falkirk Council

Carron (Scottish Gaelic: Carrann) is a village in the Falkirk council area of Scotland. It is in the Forth Valley, about 2 miles (3.2 km) north of Falkirk, 3 miles (5 km) north-west of Grangemouth and 1/2 mile (0.8 km) southeast of Stenhousemuir. Carron is contiguous with village of Carronshore to the east.

Carron is north of the River Carron. The B902 road runs through Carron. The 2001 Census recorded Carron's population as 2,567.

== Carron Company ==
The Carron Company ironworks was founded in Carron in 1759. The company introduced to Scotland the then novel method of smelting iron using coke instead of charcoal. They were associated with Boulton & Watt both as suppliers and customers. By 1814 they company was reputed to be the largest ironworks in Europe, employing 2,000 men. It developed the carronade, a short barrelled cannon. The company became insolvent in 1987 and was resurrected as Carron Phoenix. It is now owned by Franke UK, based in Manchester, and manufactures kitchen sinks.

== Notable people ==
- The lawyer, SNP activist and anti-nuclear campaigner Willie McRae was born in Carron in 1923.

== See also ==
- List of places in Falkirk council area
- River Carron
