= Allandale, Falkirk =

Coordinates: 55.987°N 3.924°W

Allandale
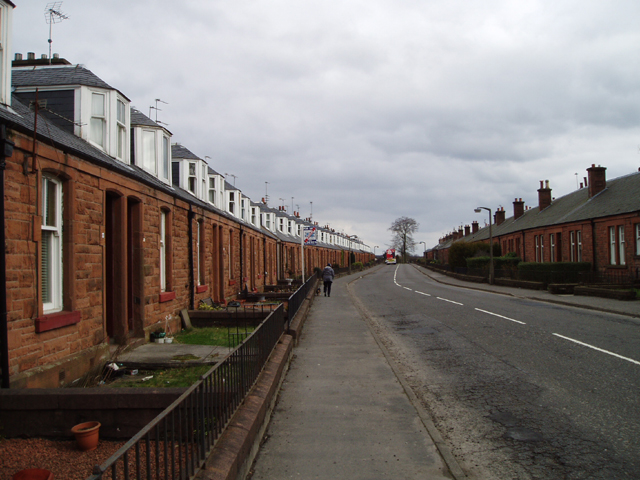
- The row of terraced cottages in Allandale

- Location within the Falkirk council area
- OS grid reference: NS799787
  - Edinburgh: 28 mi (45 km) ESE
  - London: 347 mi (558 km) SSE
- Civil parish: Falkirk
- Council area: Falkirk
- Lieutenancy area: Stirling and Falkirk
- Country: Scotland
- Sovereign state: United Kingdom
- Post town: Bonnybridge
- Postcode district: FK4
- Dialling code: 01324
- Police: Scotland
- Fire: Scottish
- Ambulance: Scottish
- UK Parliament: Falkirk
- Scottish Parliament: Falkirk West

Allandale is a small village in the Falkirk council area of Scotland. Allandale is located 1.6 miles (2.6 km) south-west of Bonnybridge, 3.5 miles (5.6 km) north-east of Cumbernauld and 5.4 miles (8.7 km) west-southwest of Falkirk. The entire village is a row of terraced housing along a section of the B816 road from Bonnybridge to Castlecary. The village is bordered to the north by the Forth & Clyde Canal and to the south by the former LMS railway.

== History ==
The village of Allandale was built in 1904 to house workers of a new brickworks started by J.G Stein and Co. Dundas Cottages was built for management and office staff a few years later, the council built additional houses in the 1960s. See www.allandalecottages.co.uk

== Sports ==
In 1970 football club, Steins Thistle, was founded as a team for the workers of the Steins Brickworks, named after John Stein. Despite the closure of the brickworks, the football club remains to date and currently compete in the Central Scottish Amateur Football League.
