= Glensburgh =

Coordinates: 56.0196°N 3.7482°W

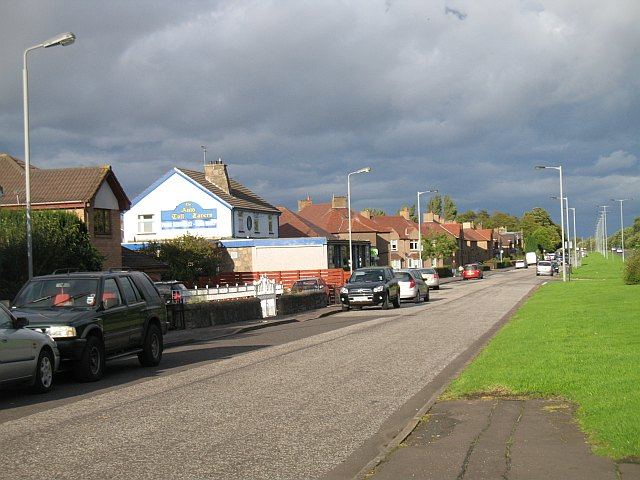
- Dalgrain Road, Glensburgh

- Location within the Falkirk council area
- OS grid reference: NS914821
- Civil parish: Grangemouth
- Council area: Falkirk
- Lieutenancy area: Stirling and Falkirk
- Country: Scotland
- Sovereign state: United Kingdom
- Post town: GRANGEMOUTH
- Postcode district: FK3
- Dialling code: 01324
- Police: Scotland
- Fire: Scottish
- Ambulance: Scottish
- UK Parliament: Alloa and Grangemouth
- Scottish Parliament: Falkirk East
- Website: falkirk.gov.uk

Glensburgh is a very small and old hamlet situated on the south bank of the River Carron, 1.1 miles (1.8 km) north-west of Grangemouth.

Originally built on farmland in 1240 as houses for farm slaves the now standing cottages date back as far as 1878. Originally called Brockborough the hamlet mainly harvested wheat and corn, until cattle farming became the norm. Nowadays there are no businesses in Glensburgh, they have all closed due to various reasons, the last, the small Glens Goods Convenience Store shut in 1968, though the building still stands.

Consisting of only two streets, Glensburgh's population is under 100 however it has always been regarded as one of Grangemouth's more prestigious residencies.

William Wallace's mother was born here in 1256, and legend has it that he spent more than one month in the area (in his mother's birth home) whilst preparing for the Battle of Falkirk.

Robert Burns, is known to have stayed in the quiet hamlet for some time between 1795 and 1800, until he was chased out by angry locals for getting a bit too familiar with the local landlord's daughter. The Queezy Pig stood with a plaque celebrating Burns' life (and drunken nights) in the tavern for nearly 150 years until it was destroyed during the war.

== See also ==
- List of places in Falkirk council area
