= FK postcode area =

Postcode area within the United Kingdom

Falkirk
- Postcode area
- Coordinates: 56.078°N 3.860°W
- Country: United Kingdom
- Postcode area: FK
- Postcode area name: Falkirk
- Post towns: 18
- Postcode districts: 21
- Postcode sectors: 49
- Postcodes (live): 7,723
- Postcodes (total): 9,602
- Statistics as at May 2020

The FK postcode area, also known as the Falkirk postcode area, is a group of 21 postcode districts in central Scotland, within 18 post towns. These cover most of the Falkirk council area (including Falkirk itself, Grangemouth, Larbert, Denny and Bonnybridge), most of the Stirling council area (including Stirling itself, Dunblane, Doune, Callander, Lochearnhead, Crianlarich and Killin) and Clackmannanshire (including Alloa, Clackmannan, Menstrie, Alva, Tillicoultry and Dollar), plus small parts of Fife, Perth and Kinross, and Argyll and Bute.

Mail for the FK postcode area is processed at Edinburgh Mail Centre, along with mail for the EH, KY, PH, DD and TD postcode areas.

== Coverage ==
The approximate coverage of the postcode districts:

Postcode district	Post town	Coverage	Local authority area(s)
FK1	FALKIRK	Falkirk (centre and south), Avonbridge, California, Camelon, Limerigg, Shieldhill, Slamannan, Standburn	Falkirk
FK2	FALKIRK	Falkirk (north), Airth, Bainsford, Brightons, Carron, Carronshore, Dunmore, Laurieston, Maddiston, Polmont, Redding, Skinflats, Westquarter	Falkirk, Stirling
FK3	GRANGEMOUTH	Grangemouth, Glensburgh	Falkirk
FK4	BONNYBRIDGE	Bonnybridge, Allandale, Banknock, Dennyloanhead, Greenhill, Haggs, High Bonnybridge, Longcroft	Falkirk
FK5	LARBERT	Larbert, Stenhousemuir, Torwood	Falkirk
FK6	DENNY	Denny, Dunipace, Fankerton, Head of Muir, Stoneywood	Falkirk
FK7	STIRLING	Stirling (south and east), Bannockburn, Cambusbarron, Cowie, Fallin, Plean, South Alloa, St. Ninians	Stirling, Falkirk
FK8	STIRLING	Stirling (centre and west), Aberfoyle, Arnprior, Buchlyvie, Gargunnock, Gartmore, Inversnaid, Kippen, Port of Menteith, Ruskie, Thornhill	Stirling
FK9	STIRLING	Stirling (north), Bridge of Allan, Blair Drummond, Blairlogie, Cambuskenneth, Lecropt	Stirling
FK10	ALLOA	Alloa, Cambus, Kincardine, Sauchie, Tullibody	Clackmannanshire, Fife
FK10	CLACKMANNAN	Clackmannan, Kennet	Clackmannanshire
FK11	MENSTRIE	Menstrie	Clackmannanshire
FK12	ALVA	Alva	Clackmannanshire
FK13	TILLICOULTRY	Tillicoultry, Coalsnaughton, Devonside (Note: contains FK13 6HR, adjoins Tillicoultry)	Clackmannanshire
FK14	DOLLAR	Dollar, Blairingone, Burnfoot, Glendevon, Pool of Muckhart, Solsgirth (Note: contains FK14 7NA)	Clackmannanshire, Perth and Kinross
FK15	DUNBLANE	Dunblane, Braco, Greenloaning, Kinbuck	Stirling, Perth and Kinross
FK16	DOUNE	Doune, Argaty, Buchany, (Note: contains FK16 6HD) Deanston	Stirling
FK17	CALLANDER	Callander, Brig o' Turk, Kilmahog	Stirling
FK18	CALLANDER	Ardchullarie More, Strathyre	Stirling
FK19	LOCHEARNHEAD	Lochearnhead, Ardvorlich, Balquhidder, Edinample, Kingshouse	Stirling
FK20	CRIANLARICH	Crianlarich, Ardchyle, Auchlyne, Luib, (Note: contains FK20 8QT) Tyndrum	Stirling, Argyll and Bute
FK21	KILLIN	Killin, Ardeonaig, Auchmore, (Note: contains FK21 8SS) Clachaig, (Note: contains FK21 8SL) Glenlochay, (Note: contains FK21 8UB) Kinnell (Note: contains FK21 8SR)	Stirling

== Map ==
FK postcode area map, showing postcode districts in red and post towns in grey text, with links to nearby EH, G, KY, ML, PA and PH postcode areas.

== See also ==
- Postcode Address File
- List of postcode areas in the United Kingdom
