= Fankerton =

Coordinates: 56.0253°N 3.9422°W

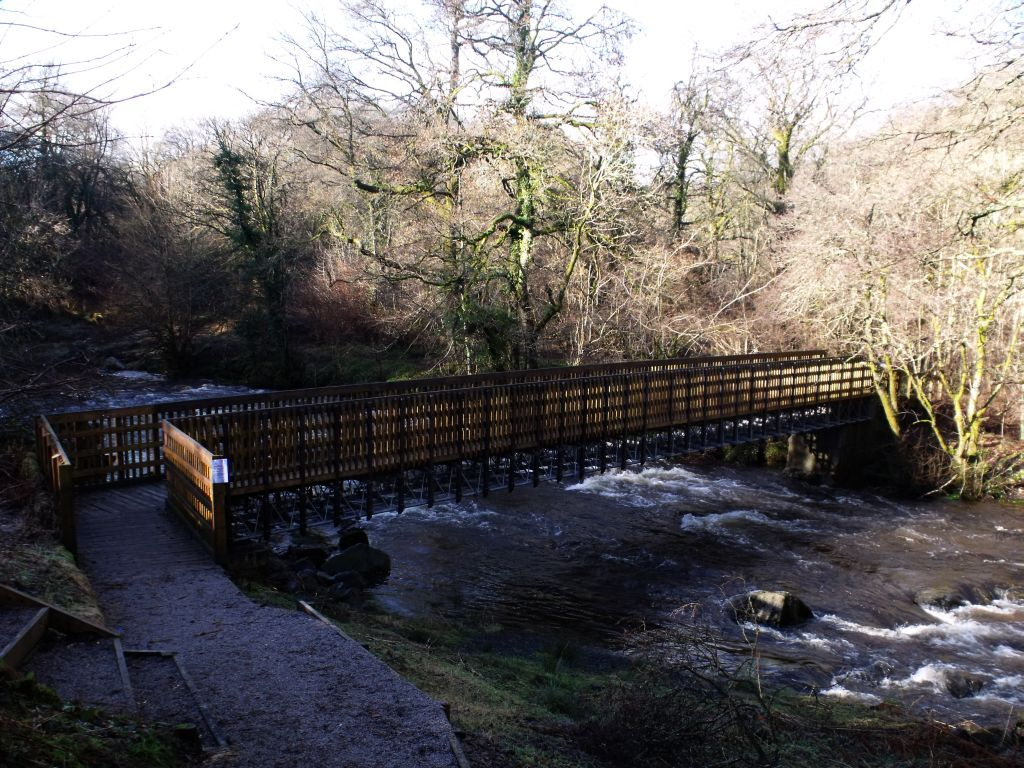
- River Carron, Fankerton footbridge

- Location within the Falkirk council area
- Population: 214 (2001 census)
- OS grid reference: NS790830
  - Edinburgh: 29.6 mi (47.6 km) ESE
  - London: 349 mi (562 km) SSE
- Civil parish: Denny
- Council area: Falkirk
- Lieutenancy area: Stirling and Falkirk
- Country: Scotland
- Sovereign state: United Kingdom
- Post town: DENNY
- Postcode district: FK6
- Dialling code: 01324
- Police: Scotland
- Fire: Scottish
- Ambulance: Scottish
- UK Parliament: Falkirk
- Scottish Parliament: Falkirk West

Fankerton is a small village which lies within the Falkirk council area of Scotland. The village is 1 mile (1.6 km) west of Denny and 6.3 miles (10.1 km) west-northwest of Falkirk.

The village is located on the south side of the River Carron along the B818 road on the outskirts of the town of Denny.

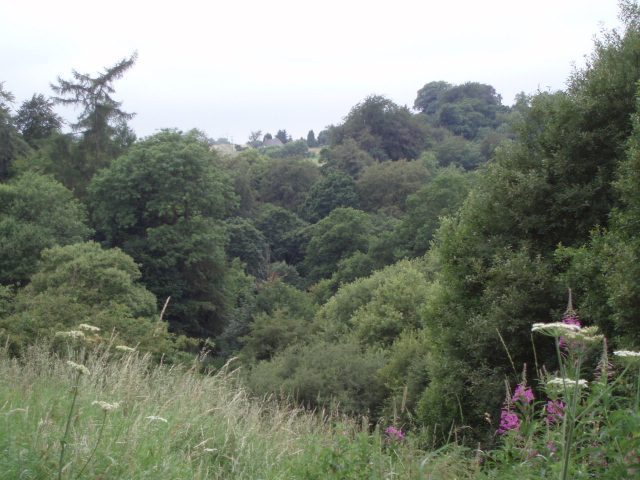
Woodland above the River Carron just outside Fankerton

Fankerton is the home of Strathcarron Hospice which provides free palliative care to people throughout Central Scotland.

The population of Fankerton at the time of the 2001 census was 214 residents.
