= River Carron, Forth =

River in central Scotland

Coordinates: 56°01′34″N 3°43′00″W

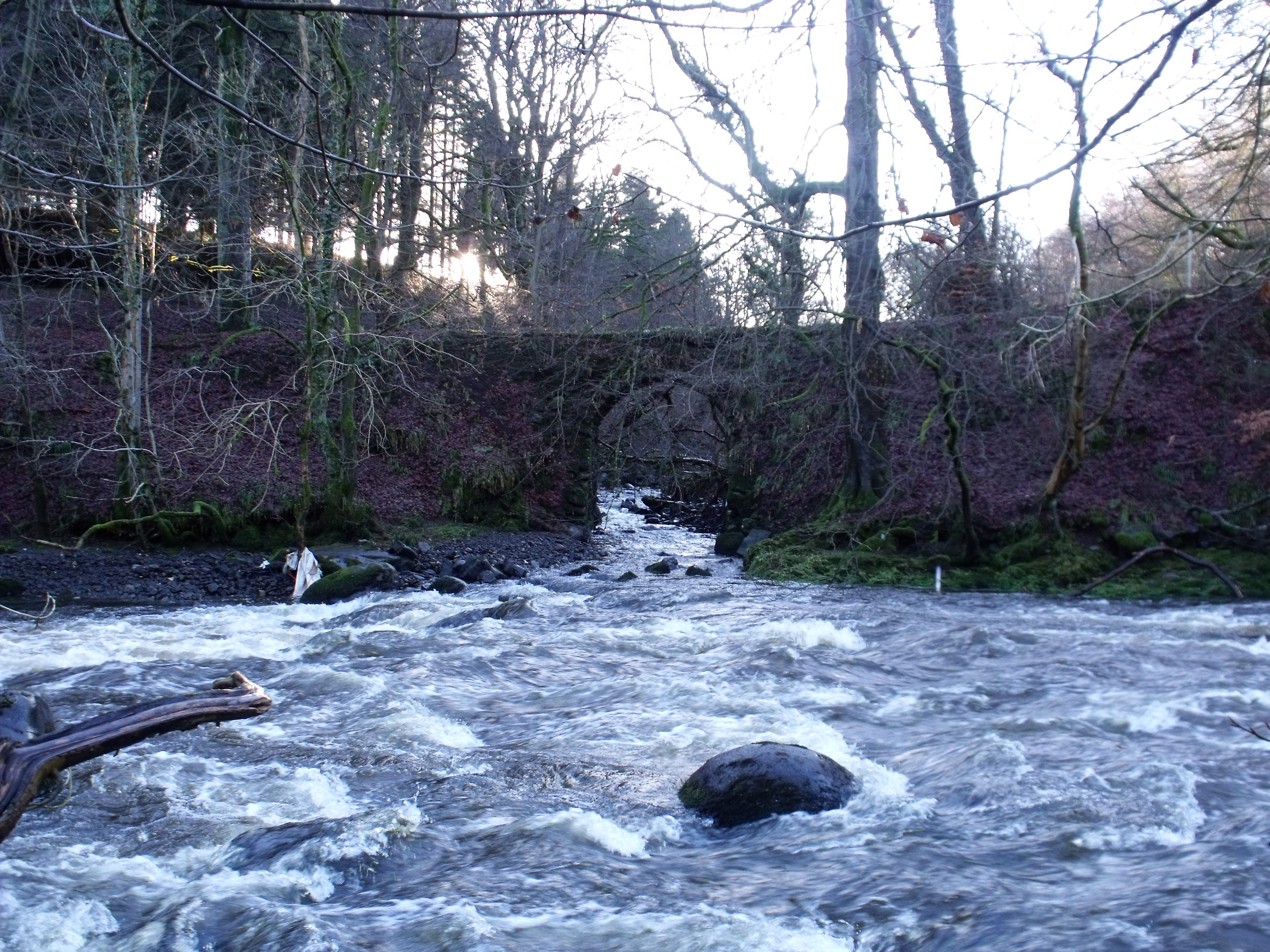
The Carron at its confluence with the Garvald Burn, near Fankerton.

The Carron (Gaelic: Carrann) is a river in central Scotland, rising in the Campsie Fells and flowing along Strathcarron into the Firth of Forth. It has given its name to several locations in Stirlingshire, as well as a type of cannon, a line of bathtubs, two warships, and an island in the Southern Hemisphere.

== Course ==
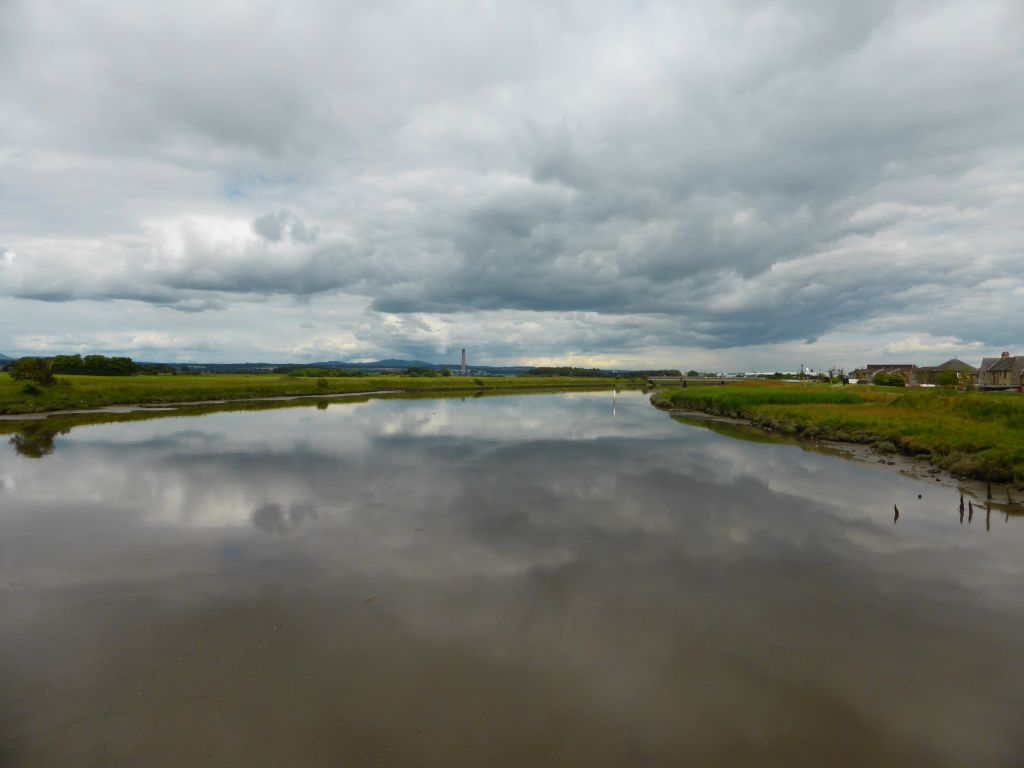
The Carron at Glensburgh, close to its mouth.

The river rises in the Campsie Fells before flowing into the Carron Reservoir and along Strathcarron. It passes by Denny, then between Larbert and Falkirk, then past Carron village. Just as the M9 motorway crosses the river, the Forth and Clyde canal joins the river. It then flows into the Forth near Grangemouth. The tributary water sources are: Carron Reservoir, Avon Burn, Earl’s Burn, Auchenbowie Burn, Loch Coulter Reservoir, Bonny Water, Glencryan Burn, Red Burn, Union Canal and the Forth and Clyde Canal.

=== Carron Bridge ===
The Carron Bridge crosses the Carron at the eastern extremity of Strathcarron Forest. It was built in 1695 to replace a ford that had existed for many hundreds of years as part of an old drove road from Kilsyth to Stirling. This bridge, with its two span stone arches, looks larger than it needs to be because the river was much larger before Carron Dam was built to create a reservoir in the 1930s.

=== Historical references ===
The river is thought by some to be the "Itys" described by Ptolemy in Geographia, his extensive 2nd century compilation of geographical knowledge.

Nennius, the Welsh historian of the 9th century, believed the name of the Carron was derived from Carausius, the 3rd century Roman commander who declared himself emperor of Britannia and northern Gaul.

The name may in fact come from the British caer avon, meaning "river of the forts", alluding to the Roman fortifications built on its banks as a barrier between their territory and that of the Picts. According to the Ossian poems of James Macpherson, the name is Gaelic in origin and means "winding river".

In 1237, in an agreement with Patrick II, Earl of Dunbar, Sir David de Graham exchanged land in Galloway for undeveloped land in the former royal forest of Dundaff and Strathcarron.

In the 17th century, William Nimmo described the river and region as follows:

The Carron, famed in ancient Celtic song, and of importance in modern trade and manufactures, issues from the Campsie hills near the middle of the isthmus between the firths of Clyde and Forth. Both the source and the place where it discharges itself into the sea, are within the shire of Stirling, which it divides into about two equal parts. The whole length of its course, from west to east, is some 14 miles [23 kilometres], the first half of which is spent among bleak hills and rocks, but, when it has reached the low grounds, its banks are fertile and wooded, and, as it advances, the neighbouring soil increases in richness and value. ..The stream is small comparatively, yet there is no river in Scotland whose surroundings have been the scene of so many memorable events.

...A short distance from its source, the river enters the Carron Bog. This vast plain and meadow... [is] Considerably elevated above the ocean, it occupies part of the table-land between the eastern and western coasts. It has, probably, been a lake at no very distant period, and gradually filled by the hill brooks washing down debris. Part, indeed, is a swamp scarcely passable at any time, but nearly inundated by every heavy rain.

...in the division called Temple Denny, the Carron, having worn a hollow channel in the rock, forms a beautiful cascade, by pouring its contracted stream over a precipice above 20 feet [6 metres] in height. ...When the river is in flood, and a triumphant torrent sweeps down the glen, this cascade is unsurpassed among Scottish streams for the grandeur of its storm of spray. ..Over the serpentine road down-hill to Denny the spirit of beauty everywhere prevails. The intervening district, indeed, is famous for its pastoral undulations; and from almost every breezy brae-top a charming view is got of the wooded banks of the river – foliage which, even in the present green-tide, displays all the variety of autumnal richness.

The river is also referred to in the Scots song "Lads o' the Fair":

For ye can see them a', the lads o' the fair
Lads frae the Forth an' the Carron Water
Workin' lads an' lads wi' gear
Lads that'll sell ye the provost's dochter
Sogers back frae the German Wars
Peddlers up frae the Border

== Strathcarron ==
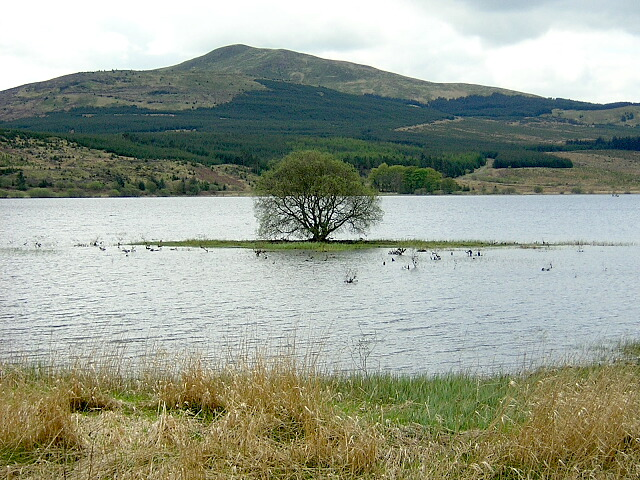
The Strathcarron Reservoir.

=== Strathcarron Loch / Carron Valley Reservoir ===
The 1,000-acre (400-hectare) Strathcarron Reservoir, completed in 1939, is stocked with brown trout by the Carron Valley Fishery.

The reservoir has proved to be an ideal habitat for the Carron's indigenous brown trout population. Thriving on the rich feeding of the newly flooded strath and with easy access to its many excellent spawning and nursery streams, the "wild brownies" of Strathcarron Reservoir are numerous.

=== The Carron Works ===
The Carron Company was an ironworks established in 1759 on the north bank of the Carron 2 miles (3.2 km) downstream of Falkirk. This company was at the forefront of the Industrial Revolution in Britain.

The company's local coal mining operations were known as the "Carron Collieries". The villages of Carronhall and Carronshore contained dwellings for miners and factory workers. This area was serviced by the Carron Branch Railway.

Through the factory's products, the river's name passed to the naval cannon called the carronade. These big guns were used during the Napoleonic Wars in melees such as the Battle of Trafalgar as well as various naval battles during the American Civil War.

The Carron Company was broken up in 1982 and various parts of the company closed down, Carron Bathrooms Ltd who manufacture acrylic baths and shower trays, and Carron Phoenix, who manufacture kitchen sinks, are still in existence.

== Warships ==
The USS Carronade (named after the cannon that was named after the river), was a ship of the U.S. Navy that was completed in 1955. Finished too late to serve in the Korean War, she was taken out of service but re-commissioned for the Vietnam War. She was decommissioned again in 1969.

== Carronade Island ==
In July 1916, HMAS Encounter was on wartime patrol and came to a small island on the northern coast of Western Australia. The crew discovered two bronze cannons standing 6 feet (1.8 m) apart and pointing into the air.

Since at the time these guns were erroneously thought to be carronades, the island on which they had been found was named Carronade Island after this discovery. Several 20th-century observers misconstrued the origin of these guns and they were long thought to give weight to the theory of Portuguese discovery of Australia. However, scientists at the Western Australian Museum in Fremantle have recently made a detailed analysis and have determined that these weapons are almost certainly of Makassan, rather than European, origin.

== See also ==
- Carron Company
- List of Sites of Special Scientific Interest in Falkirk and Clackmannan
- List of Sites of Special Scientific Interest in Nithsdale
- Stenhousemuir
- Abbotshaugh Community Woodland
