= Carronshore =

Coordinates: 56.027960°N 3.777371°W

Carronshore: Scottish Gaelic: Bruach Charrainn; Scots: Gods Village; C-Shore
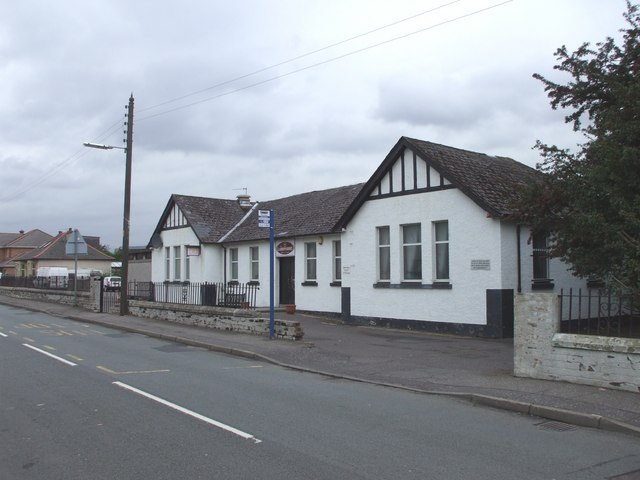
- Carronshore Social Club

- Location within the Falkirk council area
- Population: 2,970 (2020)
- OS grid reference: NS893830
  - Edinburgh: 24.0 mi (38.6 km) ESE
  - London: 347 mi (558 km) SSE
- Civil parish: Grangemouth
- Council area: Falkirk
- Lieutenancy area: Stirling and Falkirk
- Country: Scotland
- Sovereign state: United Kingdom
- Post town: FALKIRK
- Postcode district: FK2
- Dialling code: 01324
- Police: Scotland
- Fire: Scottish
- Ambulance: Scottish
- UK Parliament: Falkirk
- Scottish Parliament: Falkirk East
- Website: falkirk.gov.uk

Carronshore is a village in the Falkirk council area of Scotland. The village lies in the Forth Valley, 1.7 miles (2.7 km) north of the town of Falkirk and directly to the east of neighbouring village Carron.

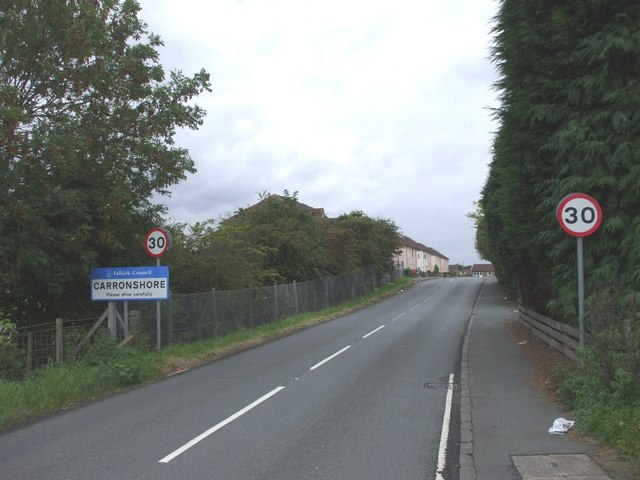
Entering Carronshore from Bothkennar Road

The village sits north of the River Carron. According to the 2011 census, Carronshore has a population of just under 3,000 residents.

The village has a primary school located to the north east of the village. It also has three takeaways, 3 convenience stores, a hair salon and a bookmakers. There are two bars in the village, 'The Vic' and the 'Carronshore Bar' as well as 'The Shore' which is a bar bistro. The village grew as a port village during the 1700s and 1800s due to its close proximity to the river to the east of the village.

The area is well connected historically to the mining industry and was the site of many pits and collieries until the middle of the 20th century.

== See also ==
- List of places in Falkirk council area
- River Carron
