= Dennyloanhead =

Coordinates: 56.000°N 3.911°W

Dennyloanhead: Scottish Gaelic: Ceann Lòn an Daingneach
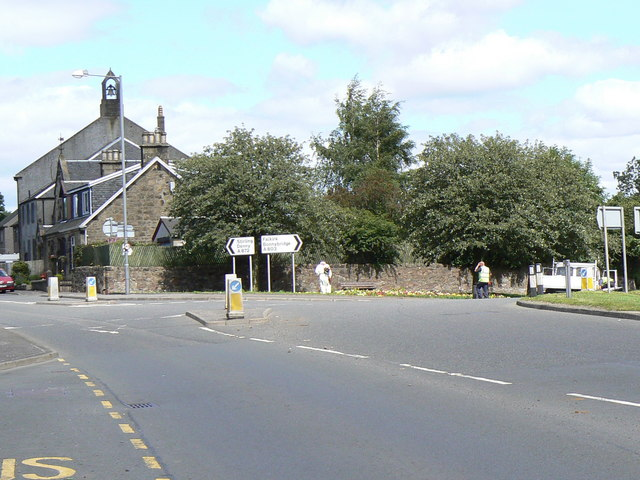
- The junction of the A803 road to Glasgow and the A872 road to Stirling at Dennyloanhead

- Location within the Falkirk council area
- Population: 1,610 (2020)
- OS grid reference: NS808802
- Civil parish: Denny
- Council area: Falkirk
- Lieutenancy area: Stirling and Falkirk
- Country: Scotland
- Sovereign state: United Kingdom
- Post town: BONNYBRIDGE
- Postcode district: FK4
- Dialling code: 01324
- Police: Scotland
- Fire: Scottish
- Ambulance: Scottish
- UK Parliament: Falkirk
- Scottish Parliament: Falkirk West

Dennyloanhead (Scottish Gaelic: Ceann Lòn an Daingneach) is a village in the Falkirk council area, Central Scotland, that is between Head of Muir and Longcroft. Dennyloanhead had a fingerpost announcing that it is 294 miles from John o' Groats. Old maps show it is 9 miles from Stirling and 5 miles from Falkirk. In 2022 it had a population of 1610.

Its main features include the Crown Hotel and Casserta's chip shop. There is another pub called the Railway Inn.

== Notable people ==
Notable people born or living in Dennyloanhead include Alex Totten (ex-manager of St Johnstone F.C & Falkirk F.C. football clubs).

Former residents include the eminent horticulturalist David Smiles Jerdan FRSE (1871–1951).

== See also ==
- Kilsyth and Bonnybridge railway
