= Bonnybridge =

Coordinates: 55.999°N 3.887°W

Bonnybridge: Scottish Gaelic: Drochaid Bhunaich; Scots: Bonniebrig
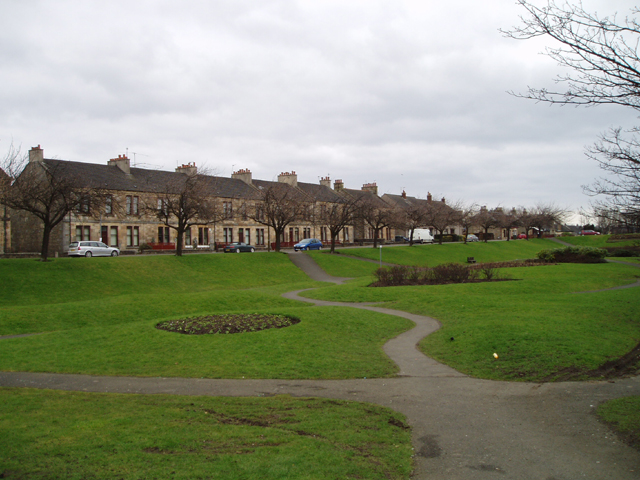
- Terraced housing in Bonnybridge

- Location within the Falkirk council area
- Area: 1.10 sq mi (2.8 km^{2})
- Population: 5,200 (2020)
  - Density: 4,727/sq mi (1,825/km^{2})
- OS grid reference: NS825805
  - Edinburgh: 27.2 mi (43.8 km) ESE
  - London: 347 mi (558 km) SSE
- Council area: Falkirk
- Lieutenancy area: Stirling and Falkirk
- Country: Scotland
- Sovereign state: United Kingdom
- Post town: BONNYBRIDGE
- Postcode district: FK4
- Dialling code: 01324
- Police: Scotland
- Fire: Scottish
- Ambulance: Scottish
- UK Parliament: Falkirk
- Scottish Parliament: Falkirk West
- Website: falkirk.gov.uk

Bonnybridge (Scottish Gaelic: Drochaid Bhunaich; Scots: Bonniebrig) is a village in the Falkirk council area of Scotland. It is 4.0 miles (6.4 km) west of Falkirk, 5.3 miles (8.5 km) north-east of Cumbernauld and 8.3 miles (13.4 km) south-southwest of Stirling. The village is situated near the Bonny Water which runs through the town and lies north of the Forth and Clyde Canal. To the south-east of Bonnybridge is a well-preserved section of the Antonine Wall, and the remnants of Rough Castle Fort, the most complete of the surviving Roman forts of the wall.

According to the 2001 Census, the population stands at 6,870 residents. However, the Bonnybridge settlement area, which includes Banknock, Denny, Dunipace and Haggs has a total population of around 24,370.

== History ==
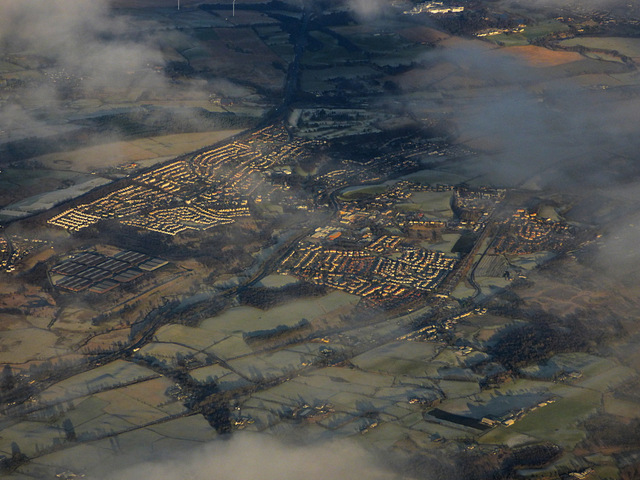
Bonnybridge from the air with the canal and rail lines visible

Bonnybridge developed greatly during the Industrial Revolution in the nineteenth century. Significant industries that were established include paper milling, sawmilling, chemical manufacturing, refractory brick manufacture and whisky distilling. Particularly important for Bonnybridge was the establishment of several iron foundries including the famous Smith and Wellstood Foundry, which was important in introducing the American metal heating stoves to Europe under the 'Esse stoves' brand. The output from these foundries was transported via the Forth & Clyde Canal to local markets, and also to Glasgow for export. Bonnybridge was also particularly well served by rail, with the Glasgow to Edinburgh, Kilsyth and Bonnybridge and the Carlisle to Perth lines both nearby. With the canal and rail links Bonnybridge became a centre for industrial production.

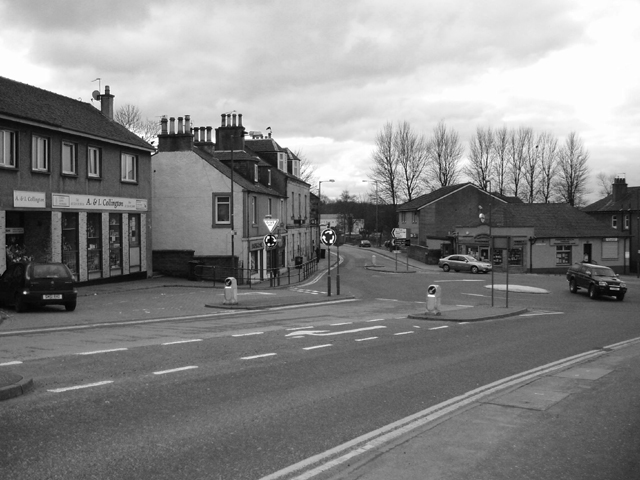
Bonnybridge town centre

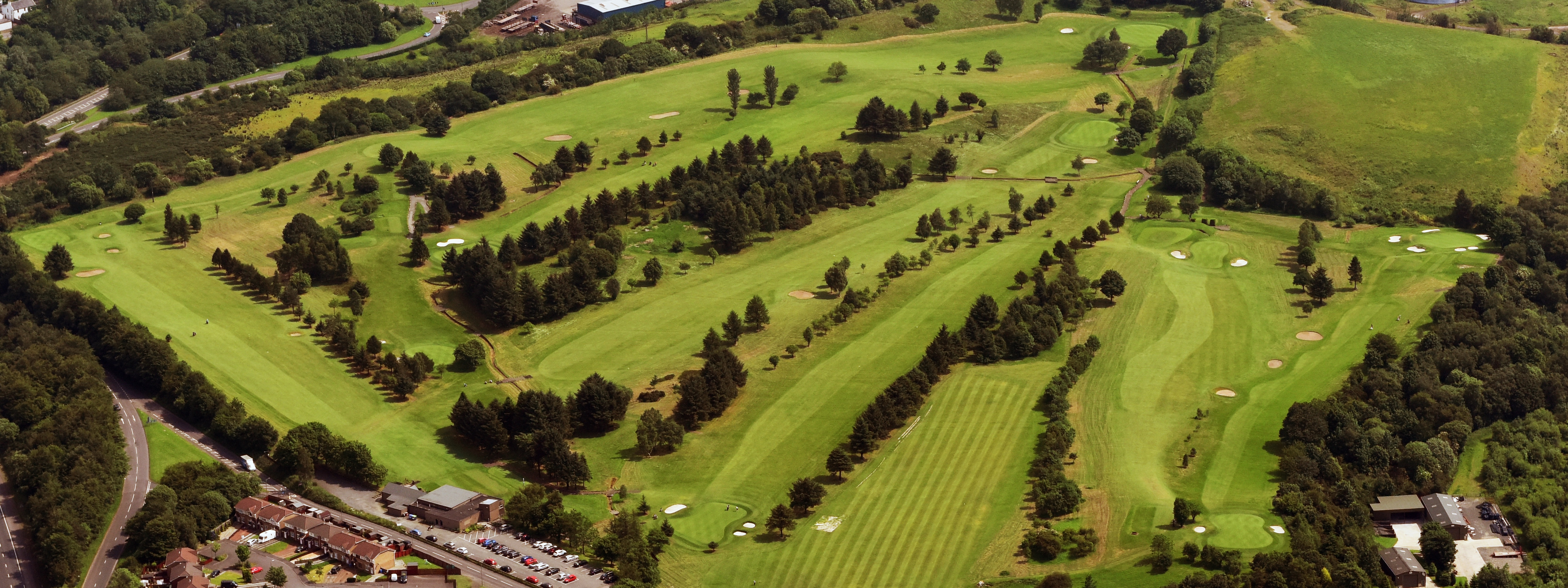
An aerial view of Bonnybridge Golf Club

The first part of the National Grid was installed at Bonnyfield on 14 July 1928. It had covered the country by 1938.

== Education ==
The town has three primary schools: Bonnybridge Primary School, Antonine Primary School and St. Joseph's R.C. Primary School. The former two are catchment primaries for Denny High School and the latter is within the catchment area of St. Mungo's High School.

== Notable people ==
- Ruth Connell, theatre, television and film actress and producer
- Calum Stevenson Portrait Artist of the Year 2021

== See also ==
- List of places in Falkirk council area
