= Falkirk Council elections =

Local government elections in Falkirk, Scotland

Falkirk Council in Scotland holds elections every five years, previously holding them every four years from its creation as a single-tier authority in 1995 to 2007.

== Council elections ==
=== As a district council ===
| Year | SNP | Labour | Conservative | Independent |
| 1974 | 11 | 17 | 1 | 7 |
| 1977 | 22 | 8 | 2 | 4 |
| 1980 (Note: New ward boundaries.) | 4 | 27 | 2 | 3 (Note: Includes 1 Independent Labour.) |
| 1984 | 7 | 25 | 2 | 2 |
| 1988 | 10 | 20 | 3 | 3 |
| 1992 | 14 | 16 | 3 | 3 |

=== As a unitary authority ===
| Year | SNP | Labour | Conservative | Independent |
| 1995 | 8 | 23 | 2 | 3 |
| 1999 (Note: New ward boundaries.) | 9 | 15 | 2 | 6 (Note: Includes 1 Independent Labour.) |
| 2003 | 9 | 14 | 2 | 7 |
| 2007 (Note: Change to single transferable vote system and new ward boundaries.) | 13 | 14 | 2 | 3 |
| 2012 | 13 | 14 | 2 | 3 |
| 2017 (Note: New ward boundaries.) | 12 | 9 | 7 | 2 |
| 2022 | 12 | 9 | 5 | 4 |

== Results maps ==
1999 results map

2003 results map

2022 results map

== By-elections ==
=== 2003-2007 ===
Town Centre By-Election 25 March 2004
| Party | Candidate | Votes | % | ±% |
|---|---|---|---|---|
| Labour | Pat Reid | 594 | 38.8 | −4.3 |
| SNP | James Anderson | 506 | 33.1 | +3.8 |
| Conservative | Alison Harris | 241 | 15.8 | −1.8 |
| Scottish Senior Citizens | James Nimmo | 92 | 6.0 | +6.0 |
| Liberal Democrats | Alan Watson | 58 | 3.8 | −6.1 |
| Scottish Socialist | Mhairi McAlpine | 39 | 2.5 | +2.5 |
| Majority | | 88 | 5.8 | |
| Turnout | | 1,530 | | |
| Labour hold | | Swing | | |

Inchyra By-Election 16 December 2004
| Party | Candidate | Votes | % | ±% |
|---|---|---|---|---|
| SNP | Angus MacDonald | 603 | 55.7 | +41.3 |
| Labour | Stephen Barr | 282 | 26.1 | −1.9 |
| Independent | Thomas Wilson | 169 | 15.6 | +15.6 |
| Independent | Jimmy Dunn | 28 | 2.6 | +2.6 |
| Majority | | 321 | 29.7 | |
| Turnout | | 1,082 | | |
| SNP gain from Independent | | Swing | | |

Herbertshire By-Election 11 August 2005
| Party | Candidate | Votes | % | ±% |
|---|---|---|---|---|
| SNP | John McNally | 1,019 | 62.7 | +27.3 |
| Labour | Jennifer Steel | 532 | 32.7 | −21.5 |
| Conservative | Malcolm McDonald | 46 | 2.8 | −7.6 |
| Scottish Socialist | Daniel Quinlan | 29 | 1.8 | +1.8 |
| Majority | | 487 | 30.0 | |
| Turnout | | 1,626 | | |
| SNP gain from Labour | | Swing | | |

=== 2007-2012 ===
Bo'ness and Blackness By-Election 19 November 2009
| Party | Candidate | FPv% | Count |
| Party | Candidate | FPv% | 1 |
|---|---|---|---|
| SNP | Ann Ritchie | 57.5 | 1,604 |
| Labour | Ainslie Lennox | 29.5 | 823 |
| Conservative | Lynn Munro | 10.2 | 283 |
| Liberal Democrats | Gavin Chomczuk | 2.8 | 79 |
| SNP hold | | | |
Valid: 2,789 Spoilt: 26 Quota: 1,408 Turnout: 2,815

Bo'ness and Blackness By-Election 10 June 2011
| Party | Candidate | FPv% | Count |
| Party | Candidate | FPv% | 1 |
|---|---|---|---|
| SNP | Sandy Turner | 57.8 | 1,621 |
| Labour | David Aitchison | 31.9 | 893 |
| Conservative | Lynn Munro | 8.2 | 231 |
| Independent | Gerry Lawton | 2.1 | 59 |
| SNP hold | | | |
Valid: 2,804 Spoilt: 19 Quota: 1,403 Turnout: 2,823

=== 2012-2017 ===
Denny and Banknock By-Election 13 August 2015
| Party | Candidate | FPv% | Count |
| Party | Candidate | FPv% | 1 |
|---|---|---|---|
| SNP | Paul Garner | 69.1 | 2,576 |
| Labour | Andrew Bell | 14.7 | 549 |
| Conservative | David Grant | 11.6 | 431 |
| Green | Brian Capaloff | 4.6 | 170 |
| SNP hold | | | |
Valid: 3,726 Spoilt: 34 Quota: 1,864 Turnout: 3,760

=== 2017-2022 ===
Bonnybridge and Larbert By-Election 15 February 2018
| Party | Candidate | FPv% | Count | | | | |
| Party | Candidate | FPv% | 1 | 2 | 3 | 4 | 5 |
|---|---|---|---|---|---|---|---|
| SNP | Niall Coleman | 38.6 | 1,295 | 1,300 | 1,354 | 1,619 | 1,866 |
| Conservative | George Stevenson | 32.4 | 1,088 | 1,096 | 1,115 | 1,280 | |
| Labour | Linda Gow | 24.2 | 813 | 821 | 858 | | |
| Green | David Robertson | 3.7 | 124 | 129 | | | |
| UKIP | Stuart Martin | 1.0 | 35 | | | | |
| SNP hold | | | | | | | |
Valid: 3,355 Spoilt: 30 Quota: 1,678 Turnout: 3,385

Falkirk South By-Election 14 October 2021
| Party | Candidate | FPv% | Count | | | |
| Party | Candidate | FPv% | 1 | 2 | 3 | 4 |
|---|---|---|---|---|---|---|
| SNP | Emma Russell | 39.2 | 1,691 | 1,844 | 2,019 | 2,472 |
| Conservative | Sarah Patrick | 38.9 | 1,678 | 1,694 | 1,903 | |
| Labour | James Marshall | 15.7 | 678 | 733 | | |
| Green | Stuart Duffin | 6.2 | 267 | | | |
| SNP gain from Labour | | | | | | |
Valid: 4,313 Spoilt: 44 Quota: 2,157 Turnout: 4,364

=== 2022-2027 ===
Falkirk South By-Election 17 October 2024
| Party | Candidate | FPv% | Count | | | | | | |
| Party | Candidate | FPv% | 1 | 2 | 3 | 4 | 5 | 6 | 7 |
|---|---|---|---|---|---|---|---|---|---|
| Labour | Claire Aitken | 30.5 | 1,014 | 1,048 | 1,090 | 1,132 | 1,161 | 1,329 | 1,724 |
| SNP | Carol Anne Beattie | 31.3 | 1,043 | 1,048 | 1,113 | 1,156 | 1,189 | 1,218 | |
| Conservative | David Grant | 14.7 | 488 | 498 | 503 | 524 | 652 | | |
| Reform | Stuart Martin | 9.9 | 330 | 341 | 343 | 371 | | | |
| Independent | Sharron McKean | 5.5 | 184 | 199 | 216 | | | | |
| Green | Tom McLaughlin | 4.5 | 151 | 161 | | | | | |
| Liberal Democrats | Sean McCay | 3.6 | 119 | | | | | | |
| Labour hold | | | | | | | | | |
Valid: 3,329 Spoilt: 36 Quota: 1,665 Turnout: 3,365
