= Falkirk East (Scottish Parliament constituency) =

Region or constituency of the Scottish Parliament

- Former county constituency for the Scottish Parliament

- Falkirk East shown within the Central Scotland electoral region and the region shown within Scotland
- Population: 80,482 (2019)

Former constituency
- Created: 1999
- Abolished: 2026
- Council area: Falkirk
- Replaced by: Falkirk East and Linlithgow, Falkirk West

Falkirk East (Gaelic: An Eaglais Bhreac an Ear) was a constituency of the Scottish Parliament covering part of the council area of Falkirk. It elected one Member of the Scottish Parliament (MSP) by the plurality (first past the post) method of election. Under the additional-member electoral system used for elections to the Scottish Parliament, it was also one of nine constituencies in the Central Scotland electoral region, which elected seven additional members, in addition to nine constituency MSPs, to produce a form of proportional representation for the region as a whole.

The constituency was created at the same time as the Scottish Parliament, for the 1999 Scottish Parliament election. Ahead of the 2011 Scottish Parliament election the boundaries of the seat were reformed and reshaped. As a result of the second periodic review of Scottish Parliament boundaries in 2025, the constituency was abolished from the 2026 Scottish Parliament election. Most of Falkirk East will be joined with parts of Linlithgow to become the new seat of Falkirk East and Linlithgow. Some areas will also be transferred to Falkirk West.

The seat was held by Michelle Thomson of the Scottish National Party since the 2021 Scottish Parliament election.

== Electoral region ==
The other eight constituencies of the Central Scotland region were: Airdrie and Shotts, Coatbridge and Chryston, Cumbernauld and Kilsyth, East Kilbride, Falkirk West, Hamilton, Larkhall and Stonehouse, Motherwell and Wishaw and Uddingston and Bellshill.

The region covered all of the Falkirk council area, all of the North Lanarkshire council area and part of the South Lanarkshire council area. From the 2026 Scottish Parliament election it will be replaced by the new Central Scotland and Lothians West electoral region.

== Constituency boundaries and council area ==
Map of boundaries from 2011

The constituency was created at the same time as the Scottish Parliament, in 1999, with the name and boundaries of an existing Westminster (UK House of Commons) constituency. In 2005, however, Scottish Westminster constituencies were mostly replaced with new constituencies. The Holyrood constituency was subsequently itself redrawn for the 2011 Scottish Parliament election, with the newly shaped Falkirk East being formed from the following electoral wards:

- In full: Bo'ness and Blackness, Grangemouth, Lower Braes, Upper Braes
- In part: Carse, Kinnaird and Tryst, Falkirk South (shared with Falkirk West constituency)

== Member of the Scottish Parliament ==
Election	Member	Party
1999	Cathy Peattie	Labour
2011	Angus MacDonald	SNP
2021	Michelle Thomson	SNP

== Election results ==
=== 2020s ===
2021 Scottish Parliament election: Falkirk East
Party	Candidate	Constituency			Regional		
Party	Candidate	Votes	%	±%	Votes	%	±%
SNP	Michelle Thomson	18,417	47.4	▼4.0	16,432	42.1	▼4.7
Labour Co-op	Allyson Black	10,832	27.9	▲2.0	8,516	21.8	▼0.5
Conservative	Neil Benny	7,618	19.6	▲0.1	8,800	22.5	▲2.7
Liberal Democrats	Paul Rolfe	1,007	2.6	▼0.6	912	2.3	▲0.1
Independent	Peter Krykant	971	2.5	New			
Green					2,333	6.0	▲1.3
Alba					629	1.6	New
All for Unity					325	0.8	New
Freedom Alliance (UK)					220	0.6	New
Scottish Family					220	0.6	New
Independent Green Voice					205	0.5	New
Abolish the Scottish Parliament					127	0.3	New
Reform					97	0.2	New
Independent	Paddy Hogg				84	0.2	New
UKIP					83	0.2	▼2.3
Scottish Libertarian					76	0.2	New
Majority		7,585	19.5	▼6.0			
Valid votes		38,845			39,059		
Invalid votes		115					
Turnout		38,960	62.9	▲8.8			
SNP hold		Swing		▼6.0			

=== 2010s ===
2016 Scottish Parliament election: Falkirk East
Party	Candidate	Constituency			Regional		
Party	Candidate	Votes	%	±%	Votes	%	±%
SNP	Angus MacDonald	16,720	51.4	▲0.6	15,199	46.4	▼3.9
Labour	Craig Martin	8,408	25.9	▼12.3	7,281	22.3	▼7.5
Conservative	Callum Laidlaw	6,342	19.5	▲11.1	6,450	19.8	▲12.0
Green					1,537	4.7	▲2.2
UKIP					812	2.5	▲1.8
Liberal Democrats	James Munro	1,054	3.2	▲0.6	716	2.2	▲0.4
Scottish Christian					279	0.9	▼0.1
Solidarity					154	0.5	▲0.3
RISE					96	0.3	New
Independent	Deryck Beaumont				63	0.2	New
Majority		8,312	25.5	▲12.9			
Valid votes		32,524			32,587		
Invalid votes		105			45		
Turnout		32,629	54.1	▲4.0	32,632	54.1	▲4.0
SNP hold		Swing		▲6.5			
Notes

2011 Scottish Parliament election: Falkirk East
Party	Candidate	Constituency			Regional		
Party	Candidate	Votes	%	±%	Votes	%	±%
SNP	Angus MacDonald	14,302	50.8	N/A	14,221	50.5	N/A
Labour	Cathy Peattie (Note: Incumbent member for this constituency)	10,767	38.2	N/A	8,401	29.8	N/A
Conservative	Lynn Munro	2,372	8.4	N/A	2,212	7.8	N/A
Green					706	2.5	N/A
All-Scotland Pensioners Party					649	2.3	N/A
Liberal Democrats	Ross Laird	727	2.6	N/A	534	1.9	N/A
BNP					310	1.1	N/A
Scottish Christian					282	1.0	N/A
Socialist Labour					280	1.0	N/A
UKIP					208	0.7	N/A
Independent	Hugh O'Donnell				81	0.3	N/A
Scottish Socialist					60	0.2	N/A
Solidarity					35	0.1	N/A
Others					206	0.7	N/A
Majority		3,535	12.6	N/A			
Valid votes		28,168			28,185		
Invalid votes		80			64		
Turnout		28,248	50.1	N/A	28,249	50.1	N/A
SNP win (new boundaries)							

=== 2000s ===
2007 Scottish Parliament election: Falkirk East
Party	Candidate	Votes	%	±%
Labour	Cathy Peattie	13,184	43.5	−8.1
SNP	Annabelle Ewing	11,312	37.3	+9.8
Conservative	Scott Campbell	3,701	12.2	+2.3
Liberal Democrats	Natalie Maver	2,136	7.0	+1.0
Majority		1,872	6.2	−18.0
Turnout		30,333	53.1	+4.0
Labour hold		Swing	-9.0	

2003 Scottish Parliament election: Falkirk East
Party	Candidate	Votes	%	±%
Labour	Cathy Peattie	14,235	51.65	+5.53
SNP	Keith Brown	7,576	27.49	−5.75
Conservative	Tom Calvert	2,720	9.87	+0.12
Liberal Democrats	Karen Utting	1,651	5.99	−1.21
Scottish Socialist	Mhairi McAlpine	1,377	5.00	New
Majority		6,659	24.16	+12.28
Turnout		27,559	49.06	−12.35
Labour hold		Swing		

=== 1990s ===
1999 Scottish Parliament election: Falkirk East
Party	Candidate	Votes	%	±%
Labour	Cathy Peattie	15,721	45.12	N/A
SNP	Keith Brown	11,582	33.24	N/A
Conservative	Alastair Orr	3,399	9.75	N/A
Liberal Democrats	Gordon Macdonald	2,509	7.20	N/A
Socialist Labour	Raymond Stead	1,643	4.67	N/A
Majority		4,139	11.88	N/A
Turnout		34,845	61.41	N/A
Labour win (new seat)				

== See also ==
- Falkirk East (UK Parliament constituency)
