= Falkirk East and Linlithgow =

Constituency of the Scottish Parliament

- County constituency for the Scottish Parliament
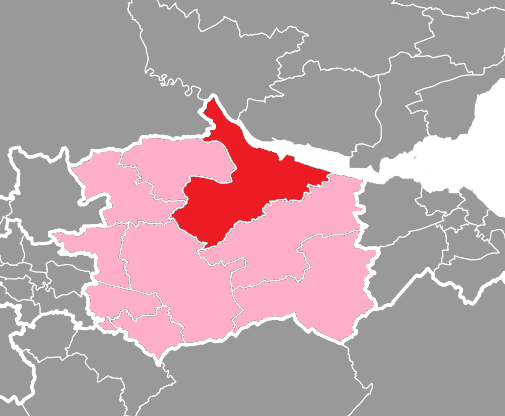

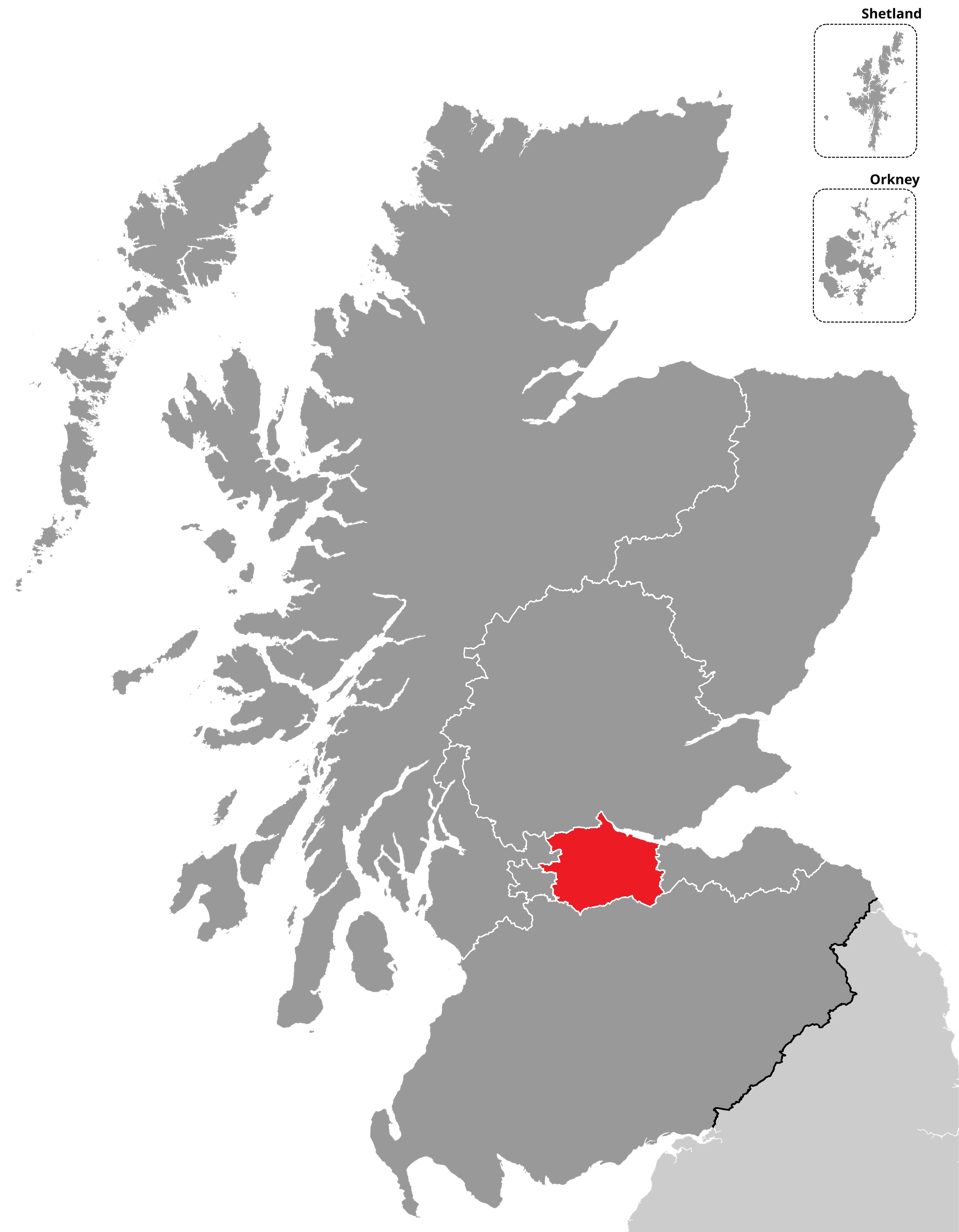
- Falkirk East and Linlithgow shown within the Central Scotland and Lothians West electoral region, and the region shown within Scotland
- Electoral region: Central Scotland and Lothians West
- Electorate: 68,123 (2026)
- Major settlements: Falkirk, Linlithgow, Bo'ness, Grangemouth

Current constituency
- Created: 2026
- Seats: 1
- Party: Scottish National Party
- MSP: Martyn Day
- Council area: Falkirk; West Lothian
- Created from: Falkirk East & Linlithgow

Falkirk East and Linlithgow is a county constituency of the Scottish Parliament which elects one Member of the Scottish Parliament (MSP) by the first past the post method of election. Under the additional-member electoral system used for elections to the Scottish Parliament, it also forms one of nine constituencies in the Central Scotland and Lothians West electoral region, which elects seven additional members, in addition to the nine constituency MSPs, to produce a form of proportional representation for the region as a whole.

The seat was first contested at the 2026 Scottish Parliament election, where it was won by Martyn Day of the Scottish National Party.

== Electoral region ==
The other eight constituencies of the Central Scotland and Lothians West region are Airdrie, Almond Valley, Bathgate, Coatbridge and Chryston, Cumbernauld and Kilsyth, Falkirk West, Motherwell and Wishaw, and Uddingston and Bellshill. The region includes all of the Falkirk, North Lanarkshire and West Lothian council areas, and parts of the South Lanarkshire council area.

== Constituency boundaries and council area ==
The Falkirk East and Linlithgow constituency was created by the second periodic review of Scottish Parliament boundaries. It covers parts of the former constituencies of Falkirk East and Linlithgow, with the remainder of the Linlithgow seat forming the new Bathgate constituency. It covers parts of the Falkirk and West Lothian council areas.

The following electoral wards were used to define the seat during the second review of Scottish Parliament boundaries:

- In Falkirk: all of the Bo'ness and Blackness, Grangemouth, Lower Braes, and Upper Braes wards; and parts of the Carse, Kinnaird and Tryst and Falkirk South wards.
- In West Lothian: part of the Linlithgow ward.

== Members ==
Election	Member	Party
2026	Martyn Day	SNP

== Election results ==
=== 2020s ===
2026 Scottish Parliament election: Falkirk East and Linlithgow (Note: Note that changes in vote share are shown with respect to the notional result of the 2021 election, calculated to account for boundary changes)
Party	Candidate	Constituency			Regional		
Party	Candidate	Votes	%	±%	Votes	%	±%
SNP	Martyn Day	14,465	38.6	▼8.4	9,827	26.1	N/A
Labour	Siobhan Paterson	9,030	24.1	▼3.0	7,156	19.0	N/A
Reform	Amanda Bland	7,906	21.1	New	7,700	20.5	N/A
Green					5,079	13.5	N/A
Conservative	Lewis Stein	2,861	7.6	▼12.9	3,594	9.6	N/A
Liberal Democrats	Paul McGarry	2,501	6.7	▲3.3	2,617	7.0	N/A
Independent	Ian El-Paget	759	2.0	New			
Scottish Family					345	0.9	N/A
Independent Green Voice					308	0.8	N/A
AtLS					244	0.6	N/A
ISP					216	0.6	N/A
Abolish the Scottish Parliament					171	0.5	N/A
Scottish Socialist					112	0.3	N/A
Advance UK					92	0.2	N/A
Workers Party					91	0.2	N/A
Scottish Libertarian					36	0.1	N/A
UKIP					25	0.1	N/A
Majority		5,435	14.5	N/A			
Valid votes		37,495			37,613		
Invalid votes		151			103		
Turnout		37,673	55.1	▼0.8	37,716	55.4	N/A
SNP win (new boundaries)							

== See also ==
- List of Scottish Parliament constituencies and electoral regions (2026–)
- Linlithgow and East Falkirk, UK Parliament constituency
