= Falkirk West (Scottish Parliament constituency) =

Region or constituency of the Scottish Parliament

- Burgh constituency for the Scottish Parliament
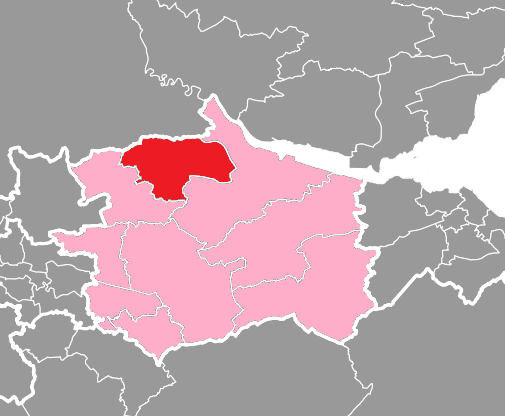

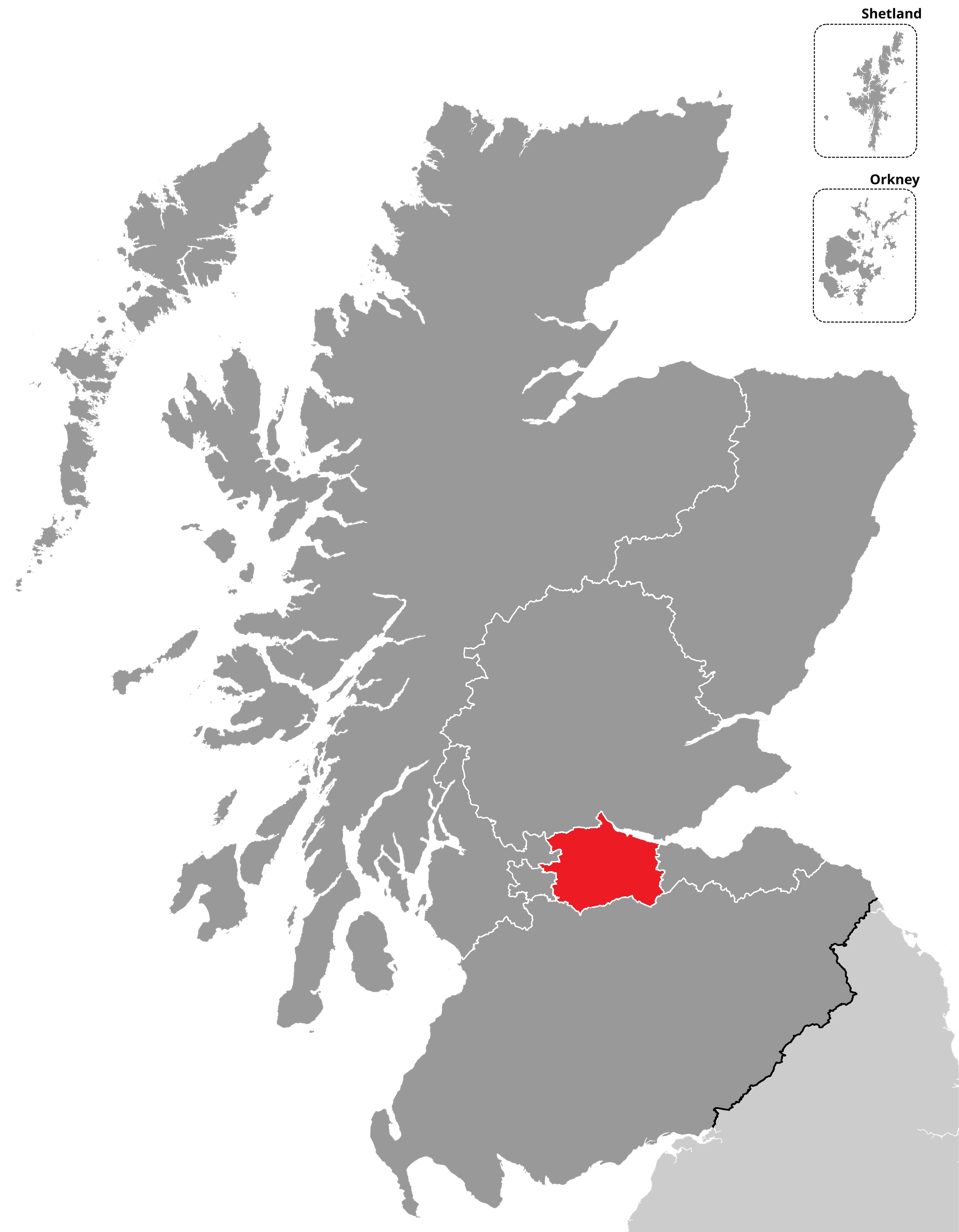
- Falkirk West shown within the Central Scotland and Lothians West electoral region, and the region shown within Scotland
- Electoral region: Central Scotland and Lothians West
- Electorate: 69,355 (2026)

Current constituency
- Created: 1999
- Party: Scottish National Party
- MSP: Gary Bouse
- Council area: Falkirk

Falkirk West (Gaelic: An Eaglais Bhreac an Iar) is a burgh constituency of the Scottish Parliament covering part of the council area of Falkirk. It elects one Member of the Scottish Parliament (MSP) by the plurality (first past the post) method of election. Under the additional-member electoral system used for elections to the Scottish Parliament, it is also one of nine constituencies in the Central Scotland and Lothians West electoral region, which elects seven additional members, in addition to nine constituency MSPs, to produce a form of proportional representation for the region as a whole.

The constituency was created at the same time as the Scottish Parliament, for the 1999 Scottish Parliament election. Ahead of the 2011 Scottish Parliament election the boundaries of the seat were altered as a result of the first periodic review of Scottish Parliament boundaries. Further boundary changes were effected by the second periodic review in 2025.

The seat has been held by Gary Bouse of the Scottish National Party since the 2026 Scottish Parliament election.

== Electoral region ==
The other eight constituencies of the Central Scotland and Lothians West region are: Airdrie, Almond Valley, Bathgate, Coatbridge and Chryston, Cumbernauld and Kilsyth, Falkirk East and Linlithgow, Motherwell and Wishaw, and Uddingston and Bellshill. The region includes all of the Falkirk, North Lanarkshire and West Lothian council areas, and parts of the South Lanarkshire council area.

Prior to the second periodic review of Scottish Parliament boundaries in 2025, Falkirk West lay in the Central Scotland region, which was abolished as a result of this review. The other eight constituencies of the Central Scotland region were: Airdrie and Shotts, Coatbridge and Chryston, Cumbernauld and Kilsyth, East Kilbride, Falkirk East, Hamilton, Larkhall and Stonehouse, Motherwell and Wishaw and Uddingston and Bellshill. The region covered all of the Falkirk council area, all of the North Lanarkshire council area and part of the South Lanarkshire council area.

== Constituency boundaries and council area ==
Map of boundaries 2011-2026

The constituency was created at the same time as the Scottish Parliament, for the 1999 Scottish Parliament election, using the name and boundaries of the existing Falkirk West constituency of the UK Parliament. Ahead of the 2005 United Kingdom general election, the boundaries of House of Commons constituencies were altered, whilst being initially retained for elections to the Scottish Parliament. There is now no longer any link between the two sets of constituencies.

Falkirk West covers a western portion of the Falkirk council area. Between 1999 and 2026, the rest of the Falkirk area formed Falkirk East, also within the Central Scotland electoral region. Following the second periodic review, Falkirk West was slightly enlarged to take in the Stenhousemuir area (formerly in Falkirk East). The remainder of Falkirk now forms part of the new seat of Falkirk East and Linlithgow, which also covers a portion of the West Lothian council area.

From the 2011 Scottish Parliament election, Falkirk West was formed from the following electoral wards:

- In full: Denny and Banknock, Bonnybridge and Larbert, Falkirk North
- In part: Carse, Kinnaird and Tryst, Falkirk South (shared with Falkirk East constituency)

Following the second review of Scottish Parliament boundaries, the following Falkirk Council electoral wards were used to redefine the seat:

- In full: Denny and Banknock, Bonnybridge and Larbert, Falkirk North
- In part: Carse, Kinnaird and Tryst, Falkirk South

== Member of the Scottish Parliament ==
Election	Member	Party
1999	Dennis Canavan	Independent
2007	Michael Matheson	Scottish National Party
2026	Gary Bouse	Scottish National Party

== Election results ==
=== 2020s ===
2026 Scottish Parliament election: Falkirk West (Note: Note that changes in vote share are shown with respect to the notional result of the 2021 election, calculated to account for boundary changes)
Party	Candidate	Constituency			Regional		
Party	Candidate	Votes	%	±%	Votes	%	±%
SNP	Gary Bouse	14,896	41.2	▼12.4	10,690	29.5	▼15.9
Reform	Richard Fairley	8,160	22.6	New	8,096	22.3	▲22.1
Labour	Paul Godzik	7,859	21.8	▼3.6	6,554	18.1	▼1.6
Green					4,614	12.7	▲5.6
Conservative	Neil Benny	2,297	6.4	▼11.7	2,773	7.6	▼12.9
Liberal Democrats	Lucy Smith	2,037	5.6	▲3.0	1,787	4.9	▲2.5
Independent	Stuart McArthur	865	2.4	New			
Independent Green Voice					355	1.0	▲0.5
Scottish Family					344	0.9	▲0.4
AtLS					279	0.8	New
ISP					245	0.7	New
Scottish Socialist					139	0.4	New
Abolish the Scottish Parliament					130	0.4	New
Workers Party					103	0.3	New
Advance UK					77	0.2	New
Scottish Libertarian					39	0.1	▼0.1
UKIP					25	0.1	Steady
Majority		6,736	18.6	▼11.3			
Valid votes		36,141			36,250		
Invalid votes		141			94		
Turnout		36,282	52.1	▼10.6	36,344	52.4	
SNP hold		Swing		▼17.5			
Notes

2021 Scottish Parliament election: Falkirk West
Party	Candidate	Constituency			Regional		
Party	Candidate	Votes	%	±%	Votes	%	±%
SNP	Michael Matheson (Note: Incumbent member for this constituency)	21,492	54.3	▼2.6	18,040	45.4	▼4.3
Labour	Monette Gordon	9,653	24.4	▲2.6	7,832	19.7	▲0.2
Conservative	Stephen Kerr (Note: Elected on the party list)	7,343	18.5	▲0.2	8,127	20.5	▲2.1
Liberal Democrats	Austin Reid	1,115	2.8	▼0.2	968	2.4	▲0.3
Green					2,802	7.1	▲1.5
Alba					697	1.8	New
All for Unity					373	0.9	New
Scottish Family					212	0.5	New
Independent Green Voice					209	0.5	New
Abolish the Scottish Parliament					112	0.3	New
Freedom Alliance (UK)					96	0.2	New
Reform					86	0.2	New
Independent	Paddy Hogg				68	0.2	New
Scottish Libertarian					63	0.2	New
UKIP					53	0.1	▼2.3
Majority		14,149	29.9	▼5.2			
Valid votes		39,603			39,738		
Invalid votes		154					
Turnout		39,629	62.2	▲8.4			
SNP hold		Swing					

=== 2010s ===
2016 Scottish Parliament election: Falkirk West
Party	Candidate	Constituency			Regional		
Party	Candidate	Votes	%	±%	Votes	%	±%
SNP	Michael Matheson (Note: Incumbent member for this constituency)	18,260	56.9	▲1.6	15,987	49.7	▲0.2
Labour	Mandy Telford	6,980	21.8	▼13.2	6,272	19.5	▼12.2
Conservative	Alison Harris (Note: Elected on the party list)	5,877	18.3	▲10.9	5,923	18.4	▲11.1
Green					1,809	5.6	▲2.9
UKIP					775	2.4	▲1.6
Liberal Democrats	Gillian Cole-Hamilton	966	3.0	▲0.7	679	2.1	▲0.4
Scottish Christian					267	0.8	▼0.3
Solidarity					225	0.7	▲0.6
RISE					132	0.4	New
Independent	Deryck Beaumont				85	0.3	New
Majority		11,280	35.1	▲14.8			
Valid votes		32,083			32,154		
Invalid votes		120			43		
Turnout		32,203	53.8	▲3.0	32,197	53.8	▲3.0
SNP hold		Swing		▲7.4			
Notes

2011 Scottish Parliament election: Falkirk West
Party	Candidate	Constituency			Regional		
Party	Candidate	Votes	%	±%	Votes	%	±%
SNP	Michael Matheson (Note: Incumbent member for this constituency)	15,607	55.3	N/A	13,989	49.5	N/A
Labour	Dennis Goldie	9,862	35.0	N/A	8,958	31.7	N/A
Conservative	Allan Finnie	2,086	7.4	N/A	2,055	7.3	N/A
Green					764	2.7	N/A
All-Scotland Pensioners Party					560	2.0	N/A
Liberal Democrats	Callum Chomczuk	644	2.3	N/A	481	1.7	N/A
Scottish Christian					318	1.1	N/A
UKIP					236	0.8	N/A
BNP					224	0.9	N/A
Socialist Labour					222	0.8	N/A
Independent	Hugh O'Donnell				97	0.3	N/A
Scottish Socialist					96	0.3	N/A
Solidarity					39	0.1	N/A
Others					202	0.7	N/A
Majority		5,745	20.3	N/A			
Valid votes		28,199			28,261		
Invalid votes		111			71		
Turnout		28,310	50.8	N/A	28,332	50.8	N/A
SNP win (new boundaries)							

=== 2000s ===
2007 Scottish Parliament election: Falkirk West
Party	Candidate	Votes	%	±%
SNP	Michael Matheson	12,068	41.9	+24.1
Labour	Dennis Goldie	11,292	39.2	+21.8
Conservative	Stephen O'Rourke	2,887	10.0	+3.7
Liberal Democrats	Callum Chomczuk	2,538	8.8	+6.0
Majority		776	2.7	N/A
Turnout		28,785	51.7	+1.1
SNP gain from Independent		Swing	+1.2	

2003 Scottish Parliament election: Falkirk West
Party	Candidate	Votes	%	±%
Independent	Dennis Canavan	14,703	55.69	+2.2
SNP	Michael Matheson	4,703	17.81	+0.5
Labour	Lee Whitehill	4,589	17.38	−0.9
Conservative	Iain Mitchell	1,657	6.28	+0.8
Liberal Democrats	Jacqueline Kelly	748	2.83	−2.7
Majority		10,000	37.88	+1.7
Turnout		26,400	50.65	−12.4
Independent hold		Swing		

=== 1990s ===
1999 Scottish Parliament election: Falkirk West
Party	Candidate	Votes	%
Independent	Dennis Canavan	18,511	53.5
Labour	Ross Martin	6,319	18.3
SNP	Michael Matheson	5,986	17.3
Conservative	Gordon Millar	1,897	5.5
Liberal Democrats	Jane Hook	1,889	5.5
Majority		12,192	35.2
Turnout		34,602	63.0
Independent win (new seat)			

== See also ==
- Falkirk West (UK Parliament constituency)
