= Denny and Banknock (ward) =

Electoral ward in Falkirk, Scotland

Location of the ward

Denny and Banknock is one of the nine wards used to elect members of the Falkirk Council. It elects four Councillors.

== Councillors ==
Election	Councillors			
2007	Jim Blackwood (Labour)	Alexander John Waddell (Ind.)	John McNally (SNP)	Martin David Oliver (SNP)
2012	Jim Blackwood (Labour)	Brian McCabe (Ind.)	John McNally (SNP)	Martin David Oliver (SNP)
2015 by	Jim Blackwood (Labour)	Brian McCabe (Ind.)	Paul Garner (SNP)	Martin David Oliver (SNP)
2017	Jim Blackwood (Labour)	Nigel Harris (Conservative)	Paul Garner (SNP)	Fiona Collie (SNP)
2022	Alf Kelly (Labour)	Brian McCabe (Ind.)	Paul Garner (SNP)	Fiona Collie (SNP)

== Election results ==
=== 2022 Election ===
2022 Falkirk Council election

Denny and Banknock - 4 seats
Party	Candidate	FPv%	Count						
Party	Candidate	FPv%	1						
SNP	Paul Garner (incumbent)		1,868						
SNP	Fiona Collie (incumbent)		1,084	1,571.69					
Conservative	Nigel Harris (incumbent)		1,026	1,033.67	1,041.5	1,056.96	1,073.66	1,092.16	
Labour	Alf Kelly		889	903.71	935.17	1,011.42	1,368.98		
Independent	Brian McCabe		860	890.68	929.43	1,031.31	1,072.02	1,106.23	1,610.76
Labour	James Marshall		423	433.27	444.87	461.56			
Green	Rachel Hart		200	223.01	346.01				
Electorate: 15,534 Valid: 6,350 Spoilt: 128 Quota: 1, 271 Turnout: 43.8%

=== 2017 Election ===
2017 Falkirk Council election

Denny and Banknock - 4 seats
Party	Candidate	FPv%	Count									
Party	Candidate	FPv%	1	2	3	4	5	6	7	8	9	10
SNP	Paul Garner (incumbent)	26.3	1,664									
Labour	Jim Blackwood (incumbent)	15.27	965	976.27	976.51	996.75	1,019.23	1,020.57	1,233.78	1,359.61		
Conservative	Nigel Harris	14.49	916	918.16	918.16	924.16	950.16	950.39	964.43	1,068.91	1,086.46	1,314.59
SNP	Fiona Collie	13.98	884	1,200.27	1,210.99	1,255.15	1,274.11					
Independent	Brian McCabe (incumbent)	10.87	687	719.13	722.85	737.57	780.57	782.45	811.89	984.92	1,002.97	
Independent	Alexander John Waddell	8.26	522	528.47	529.47	537.7	615.95	616.69	640.97			
Labour	Khalid Hamid	4.97	314	322.87	323.11	333.35	355.83	356.51				
Independent	Anne Montgomery	3.65	231	232.92	235.16	247.4						
Green	Cheryl Brind	1.89	119	122.84	125.08							
Solidarity	Sean Mellon	0.3	19	21.64								
Electorate: TBC Valid: 6,321 Spoilt: 95 Quota: 1,265 Turnout: 6,416 (44.1%)

=== 2015 By-election ===
Denny and Banknock By-election (13 August 2015) - 1 Seat
Party	Candidate	FPv%	Count
Party	Candidate	FPv%	1
SNP	Paul Garner	69.1%	2,576
Labour	Andrew Bell	14.7%	549
Conservative	David Grant	11.6%	431
Green	Brian Capaloff	4.6%	170
Electorate: 14,462 Valid: 3,726 Spoilt: 34 Quota: 1,864 Turnout: 3,760 (26.1%)

=== 2012 Election ===
2012 Falkirk Council election

Denny and Banknock - 4 seats
Party	Candidate	FPv%	Count						
Party	Candidate	FPv%	1	2	3	4	5	6	7
SNP	John McNally (incumbent)†	28.23	1,502						
Labour	Jim Blackwood (incumbent)	22.35	1,189						
Independent	Brian McCabe	11.69	622	676.9	680.9	714.1	801.2	977.6	1,133.3
SNP	Martin D. Oliver(incumbent)	10.73	571	870.1	879.4	900.1	972.5	1,062.6	1,148
Labour	Terrie Hay	8.33	443	459	539.7	563.2	614.7	684.9	
Independent	Alexander John Waddell (incumbent)	7.72	411	433.1	439.6	480.2	539.5		
Independent	Khalid Hamid	7.27	387	398.9	406.4	428.2			
Conservative	David Grant	3.70	197	200.7	204.5				
Electorate: 12,350 Valid: 5,321 Spoilt: 95 Quota: 1,065 Turnout: 5,416 (39.45%)

=== 2007 Election ===
2007 Falkirk Council election

Denny and Banknock
Party	Candidate	FPv%	%	Seat	Count
SNP	John McNally	2,093	29.1	1	1
Labour	Jim Blackwood	1,707	23.7	2	1
Independent	Alexander John Waddell	991	13.8	3	8
SNP	Martin David Oliver	789	11.0	4	8
Labour	Khalid Hamid	775	10.8		
Conservative	Alistair Hislop	384	5.3		
Independent	Fiona Buchanan	238	3.3		
Scottish Socialist	Danny Quinlan	134	1.9		
Independent	Wesley Edmund	83	1.2		
