= Upper Braes (ward) =

Electoral ward in Falkirk, Scotland

Location of the ward

Upper Braes is one of the nine wards used to elect members of the Falkirk Council. It elects three Councillors.

== Councillors ==
Election	Councillors		
2007	Gordon Hughes (SNP)	Stephen Fry (Labour)	John McLuckie (Labour)
2012	Gordon Hughes (SNP)	Rosie Murray (Labour)	John McLuckie (Labour)
2017	Gordon Hughes (SNP)	James Kerr (Conservative)	John McLuckie (Labour)
2022	Jim Robertson (SNP)	Claire Mackie-Brown (Conservative/ Independent /Reform UK)	Siobhan Patterson (Labour)
2024	Jim Robertson (SNP)	Claire Mackie-Brown (Conservative/ Independent /Reform UK)	Siobhan Patterson (Labour)
2025	Jim Robertson (SNP)	Claire Mackie-Brown (Conservative/ Independent /Reform UK)	Siobhan Patterson (Labour)

== Election results ==
=== 2022 Election ===
2022 Falkirk Council election

Upper Braes - 3 seats
Party	Candidate	FPv%	Count							
Party	Candidate	FPv%	1							
SNP	Jim Robertson		1,918							
Labour	Siobhan Paterson		1,272	1,365.42	1,370.55	1,384.12				
Conservative	Claire Brown		1,202	1,214.45	1,219.45	1,224.46	1,225.95	1,233.53	1,259.08	1,406.68
Independent	John McLuckie (incumbent)		459	489.57	499.27	548.80	550.05	568.17	603.26	
Green	Rachel Kidd		308	516.93	520.78	535.32	536.81	586.76	644.66	740.41
Liberal Democrats	Austin Reid		139	161.65	161.65	168.21	170.22	177.23		
Independent	Ian Kennedy		89	98.34	114.04					
Alba	Colin Todd		63	110.56	114.13	118.13	118.39			
Independent	Mark Tunnicliff		49	55.23						
Electorate: 12,734 Valid: 5,499 Spoilt: 79 Quota: 1,375 Turnout: 43.8%

=== 2017 Election ===
2017 Falkirk Council election

Upper Braes - 3 seats
Party	Candidate	FPv%	Count						
Party	Candidate	FPv%	1	2	3	4	5	6	7
Conservative	James Kerr††	30.22	1,701						
Labour	John McLuckie (incumbent)††	23.85	1,342	1,441.91					
SNP	Gordon Hughes (incumbent)	18.27	1,028	1,036.61	1,040.73	1,066.78	1,093.98	1,218.31	2,112.31
SNP	Farah Farzana	14.84	835	837.07	838.76	890.08	910.68	978.8	
Independent	Jim Robertson	6.4	360	401.68	409.18	449.03	602.12		
Independent	Neil Durning	3.25	183	224.17	228.32	262			
Green	Tom McLaughlin	3.18	179	193.12	196.92				
Electorate: TBC Valid: 5,628 Spoilt: 104 Quota: 1,408 Turnout: 5,732 (46.5%)

=== 2012 Election ===
2012 Falkirk Council election

Upper Braes - 3 seats
Party	Candidate	FPv%	Count				
Party	Candidate	FPv%	1	2	3	4	5
Labour	John McLuckie (incumbent)	32.26	1,361				
SNP	Gordon Hughes (incumbent)	29.79	1,257				
SNP	Ricky Wilson	13.46	568	592.5	757.9	862.9	
Conservative	Alan Rust	13.04	550	565.5	573.5		
Labour	Rosie Murray	11.45	483	712.3	725.3	905.9	1,176.5
Electorate: 11,033 Valid: 4,219 Spoilt: 101 Quota: 1,055 Turnout: 4,320 (38.24%)

=== 2007 Election ===
2007 Falkirk Council election

Upper Braes
Party	Candidate	FPv%	%	Seat	Count
SNP	Gordon Hughes	1,961	32.8	1	1
Labour	Stephen Fry	1,388	23.2	2	3
Labour	John McLuckie	1,167	19.5	3	6
Conservative	Drew Lapsley	804	13.5		
Independent	Neil Durning	555	9.3		
Scottish Socialist	Mary Straub	100	1.7		
