= Grangemouth (ward) =

Local government electoral division in the United Kingdom

Location of the ward

Grangemouth is one of the nine wards used to elect members of the Falkirk Council. As at the 2017 election, it elects three Councillors.

== Councillors ==
Election	Councillors			
2007	Allyson Black (Labour)	Robert Spears (Ind.)	Alistair McNeill (Labour)	Angus MacDonald (SNP)
2012	Allyson Black (Labour)	Robert Spears (Ind.)	Joan Paterson (Labour)	David Balfour (SNP)
2017	Allyson Black (Labour)	Robert Spears (Ind.)	3 seats	David Balfour (SNP)
2022	Alan Nimmo (Labour)	Robert Spears (Ind.)	3 seats	David Balfour (SNP)

== Election results ==
=== 2022 Election ===
2022 Falkirk Council election

Grangemouth - 3 seats
Party	Candidate	FPv%	Count							
Party	Candidate	FPv%	1	2	3	4	5	6	7	8
SNP	David Balfour (incumbent)		1,808							
Labour	Alan Nimmo		1,179	1,211.98	1,217.28	1,244.09	1,281.31			
Conservative	Mandy Bryson		685	694.08	708.01	702.38	725.98	729.38		
Independent	Robert Spears (incumbent)		611	645.79	647.79	668.61	731.75	738.42	1,071.96	1,391.08
SNP	John Haston		454	873.93	876.23	942.91	960.45	962.68	984.84	
Independent	Marc Bozza		157	165.78	169.77	176.68				
Green	Rhys Stenhouse		122	137.73	138.43					
UKIP	Martin Stuart		27	27.61						
Electorate: 12,741 Valid: 5,043 Spoilt: 161 Quota: 1,261 Turnout: 40.5%

=== 2017 Election ===
2017 Falkirk Council election

Grangemouth - 3 seats
Party	Candidate	FPv%	Count					
Party	Candidate	FPv%	1	2	3	4	5	6
SNP	David Balfour (incumbent)	26.95	1,510					
Labour	Allyson Black (incumbent)	23.22	1,301	1,309.44	1,332.73	1,483.53		
Conservative	James Bundy	18.38	1,030	1,031.79	1,040	1,074.58	1,094.4	
Independent	Robert Spears (incumbent)	17.49	980	988.08	1,004.58	1,247.12	1,274.46	1,834.19
SNP	Margaret-Ann Milne	12.06	676	756.82	799.39			
Green	Judith McLaughlin	1.91	107	109.72				
Electorate: TBC Valid: 5,604 Spoilt: 99 Quota: 1,402 Turnout: 5,703 (44.3%)

=== 2012 Election ===
2012 Falkirk Council election

Grangemouth - 4 seats
Party	Candidate	FPv%	Count							
Party	Candidate	FPv%	1	2	3	4	5	6	7	8
Labour	Allyson Black (incumbent)	24.68	1,201							
SNP	David Balfour	22.58	1,099							
Independent	Robert Spears (incumbent)	17.71	862	877.9	882.4	963.6	1,064.6			
Labour	Joan Paterson	10.33	503	675.4	678.6	695.6	725.8	739.3	815.4	978.4
SNP	Andrew Cowie	8.69	423	432.3	538.8	562.2	596.2	608.9	683.7	
Conservative	Amanda Nicol	5.73	279	285	286.3	309.8				
Independent	Jim Waugh	5.59	272	275.4	277.4	331.6	377.9	412.7		
Independent	David Sharp	4.68	228	231.6	233.4					
Electorate: 12,350 Valid: 4,867 Spoilt: 124 Quota: 974 Turnout: 4,991 (39.41%)

=== 2007 Election ===
2007 Falkirk Council election

Grangemouth
Party	Candidate	FPv%	%	Seat	Count
SNP	Angus MacDonald	1,954	27.9	1	1
Labour	Allyson Black	1,497	21.4	2	1
Independent	Robert Spears	1,412	20.2	3	1
Labour	Alistair McNeill	1,087	15.5	4	7
Conservative	Stuart Martin	711	10.2		
SNP	Angus Rae	238	3.4		
Scottish Socialist	Carol Hainey	96	1.4		
