= Lower Braes (ward) =

Electoral ward in Falkirk, Scotland

Location of the ward

Lower Braes is one of the nine wards used to elect members of the Falkirk Council. It elects three Councillors.

== Councillors ==
Election	Councillors		
2007	Malcolm Nicol (Conservative)	Steven Jackson (SNP)	Alan Nimmo (Labour)
2012	Malcolm Nicol (Conservative)	Steven Jackson (SNP)	Alan Nimmo (Labour)
2017	Malcolm Nicol (Conservative)	Adanna McCue (SNP)	Alan Nimmo (Labour)
2022	James Kerr (Conservative)	Gordon Forrest (SNP)	Anne Hannah (Labour)

== Election results ==
=== 2022 Election ===
2022 Falkirk Council election

Lower Braes - 3 seats
Party	Candidate	FPv%	Count					
Party	Candidate	FPv%	1	2	3	4	5	6
Labour	Anne Hannah		1,393					
SNP	Gordon Forrest		1,205	1,213.21	1,237.65	1,248.06	1,330.98	
Conservative	James Kerr		1,204	1,225.29	1,237.65	1,297.984	1,330.97	
SNP	Adanna McCue (incumbent)		825	830.32	841.55	848.75	848.91	
Green	Doug Sheehan		298	309.76	378.19	320.97		
Liberal Democrats	Hunter Ashley		167	195.32	201.86			
Alba	Scott Fallon		67	69.44				
Electorate: 12,003 Valid: 5,159 Spoilt: 48 Quota: 1,290 Turnout: 43.6%

=== 2017 Election ===
2017 Falkirk Council election

Lower Braes - 3 seats
Party	Candidate	FPv%	Count							
Party	Candidate	FPv%	1	2	3	4	5	6	7	8
Conservative	Malcolm Nicol (incumbent)	34.49	1,864							
SNP	Adanna McCue	30.19	1,632							
Labour	Alan Nimmo (incumbent)	14.06	760	894.04	944.99	961.84	970.94	1,066.33	1,146.65	1,446.12
Independent	Ricky Wilson	10.34	559	633.98	669.5	684.89	725.99	779.78	993.11	
Independent	Steven Jackson (incumbent)	5.27	285	339.93	359.32	369.06	421.23	472.93		
Green	Chris Brind	3.02	163	181.68	282.9	293.23	303.1			
Independent	Sam Hemple	1.81	98	121.07	128.28	137.12				
UKIP	Stuart Martin	0.81	44	89.04	91.96					
Electorate: TBC Valid: 5,405 Spoilt: 50 Quota: 1,352 Turnout: 5,455 (46.2%)

=== 2012 Election ===
2012 Falkirk Council election

Lower Braes - 3 seats
Party	Candidate	FPv%	Count
Party	Candidate	FPv%	1
Conservative	Malcolm Nicol (incumbent)	35.99	1,447
SNP	Steven Jackson (incumbent)	31.32	1,259
Labour	Alan Nimmo (incumbent)	27.78	1,117
SNP	Robbie Landsman	4.90	197
Electorate: 9,948 Valid: 4,020 Spoilt: 100 Quota: 1,068 Turnout: 4,120 (40.41%)

=== 2007 Election ===
2007 Falkirk Council election

Lower Braes
Party	Candidate	FPv%	%	Seat	Count
Conservative	Malcolm Nicol	2,046	35.9	1	1
SNP	Steven Jackson	1,281	22.5	2	3
Labour	Alan Nimmo	1,108	19.4	3	6
Independent	Ricky Wilson	963	16.9		
Green	Norman Philip	233	4.1		
Scottish Socialist	William McSporran	74	1.3		
