= Falkirk North (ward) =

Electoral ward in Falkirk, Scotland

Location of the ward

Falkirk North is one of the nine wards used to elect members of the Falkirk Council. It elects four Councillors.

== Councillors ==
Election	Councillors			
2007	David Alexander (SNP)	Cecil Meiklejohn (SNP)	Craig Martin (Labour)	Pat Reid (Labour)
2012	David Alexander (SNP)	Cecil Meiklejohn (SNP)	Craig Martin (Labour)	Pat Reid (Labour)
2017	David Alexander (SNP)	Cecil Meiklejohn (SNP)	Denis Goldie (Labour)	Robert Bissett (Labour)
2022	Ian Sinclair (SNP)	Cecil Meiklejohn (SNP)	James Bundy (Conservative)	Robert Bissett (Labour)

== Election results ==
=== 2022 Election ===
2022 Falkirk Council election

Falkirk North - 4 seats
Party	Candidate	FPv%	Count						
Party	Candidate	FPv%	1						
SNP	Cecil Meiklejohn (incumbent)		2,260						
Labour	Robert Bissett (incumbent)		1,464						
Conservative	James Bundy		857	863.85	867.95	880.64	912.95	947.87	1,277.89
SNP	Iain Sinclair		801	1,625.50					
Labour	Robbie Burgess		399	423.41	466.48	604.17	651.31	929.0	
Green	Judith McLaughlin		381	424.26	553.38	557.96	631.1		
Alba	Zohaib Arshad		294	307.28	345.31	348.36			
Electorate: 16,749 Valid: 6,456 Spoilt: 174 Quota: 1,292 Turnout: 39.6%

=== 2017 Election ===
2017 Falkirk Council election

Falkirk North - 4 seats
Party	Candidate	FPv%	Count					
Party	Candidate	FPv%	1	2	3	4	5	6
SNP	David Alexander (incumbent)	35.82	2,326					
Labour	Denis Goldie *	17.22	1,118	1,160.83	1,208.1	1,313.84		
SNP	Cecil Meiklejohn (incumbent)	16.33	1,060	1,864.91				
Conservative	Wendy Chandrachud	14.11	916	933.22	948.14	978.61	979.61	
Labour	Robert Bissett	12.95	841	908.11	962.4	1,102.62	1,113.75	1,563.47
Green	Debra Pickering	3.56	231	263.23	519.28			
Electorate: TBC Valid: 6,492 Spoilt: 196 Quota: 1,299 Turnout: 6,688 (41%)

=== 2012 Election ===
2012 Falkirk Council election

Falkirk North - 4 seats
Party	Candidate	FPv%	Count	
Party	Candidate	FPv%	1	2
SNP	David Alexander (incumbent)	36.46	1,915	
Labour	Craig Martin (incumbent)	20.98	1,102	
Labour	Pat Reid (incumbent)	19.25	1,011	1,070.6
SNP	Cecil Meiklejohn (incumbent)	16.73	879	1,604.5
Conservative	Robert Edward Ardis	6.59	346	361.8
Electorate: 13,878 Valid: 5,253 Spoilt: 129 Quota: 1,051 Turnout: 5,382 (37.85%)

=== 2007 Election ===
2007 Falkirk Council election

Falkirk North
Party	Candidate	FPv%	%	Seat	Count
SNP	David Alexander	2,500	34.7	1	1
Labour	Craig Martin	1,480	20.5	2	2
Labour	Pat Reid	1,293	17.9	3	5
SNP	Cecil Meiklejohn	689	9.6	4	7
Conservative	Alison Harris	562	7.8		
Liberal Democrats	Gavin Chomczuk	451	6.3		
Independent	Margaret D. Laurie	136	1.9		
Scottish Socialist	Gordon Clubb	94	1.3		
