= Gary Bouse (MSP) =

Scottish politician

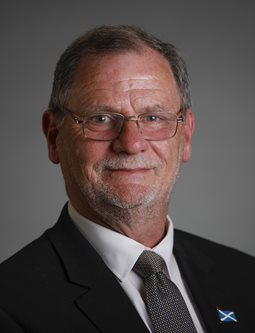
- Official portrait, 2026

Member of the Scottish Parliament for Falkirk West
- Incumbent
- Assumed office 7 May 2026
- Preceded by: Michael Matheson
- Majority: 6,736 (18.6%)

Personal details
- Party: Scottish National Party

Gary Bouse is a Scottish politician who has served as a Member of the Scottish Parliament for Falkirk West since May 2026. He is a member of the Scottish National Party.

== Biography ==
In 2017 and 2022, he was elected to represent Carse, Kinnaird and Tryst on Falkirk Council. In 2023, he applied to be the SNP candidate for Falkirk in the 2024 United Kingdom general election. Bouse was selected as the Scottish National Party candidate for the Falkirk West constituency in the 2026 Scottish Parliament election, replacing Michael Matheson who stood down. This was after the selection contest was reheld.
