= Mary Georgina Wade Wilson =

Scottish artist (1856–1939)

- Born: 12 September 1856; Falkirk, Scotland
- Died: 1939; Falkirk, Scotland

Mary Georgina Wade Wilson (12 September 1856 – 1939) was a Scottish artist known for her watercolor and pastel paintings.

Wilson grew up on the Bantaskine Estate in Falkirk before training in Edinburgh and Paris. She illustrated gardening books and her work includes also illustrations of gardens and the landscaped grounds of the Bantaskine estate were often a subject of her paintings. The Falkirk Museum has an image of her as a child while the Falkirk Community Trust Museum & Archives Collections holds one of her works.
