= Bonnybridge and Larbert (ward) =

Electoral ward in Falkirk, Scotland

Location of the ward

Bonnybridge and Larbert is one of the nine wards used to elect members of the Falkirk Council. It elects three Councillors.

== Councillors ==
Election	Councillors		
2007	Linda Gow (Labour)	Billy Buchanan (Ind.)	Tom Coleman (SNP)
2012	Linda Gow (Labour)	Billy Buchanan (Ind.)	Tom Coleman (SNP)
2017	David Grant (Conservative)	Billy Buchanan (Ind.)	Tom Coleman (SNP)
2018 by	David Grant (Conservative)	Billy Buchanan (Ind.)	Niall Coleman (SNP)
2022	Jack Redmond (Labour)	Billy Buchanan (Ind.)	Bryan Deakin (SNP)

== Election results ==
=== 2022 Election ===
2022 Falkirk Council election

Bonnybridge and Larbert - 3 seats
Party	Candidate	FPv%	Count					
Party	Candidate	FPv%	1	2	3	4	5	6
Independent	Billy Buchanan (incumbent)		1,423					
SNP	Bryan Deakin		1,212	1,214.26	1,276.53	1,988.19		
Conservative	David Grant (incumbent)		1,038	1,040.52	1,056.57	1,064.59	1,084.79	
Labour	Jack Redmond		993	996.38	1,072.64	1,111.79	1,327.54	1,942.15
SNP	Jim Muir		700	700.94	797.07			
Green	David Robertson		277	277.94				
Electorate: 13,094 Valid: 5,643 Spoilt: 87 Quota: 1,411 Turnout: 43.8%

=== 2018 By-election ===
Bonnybridge and Larbert By-election (15 February 2018)
Party	Candidate	FPv%	Count				
Party	Candidate	FPv%	1	2	3	4	5
SNP	Niall Coleman	38.6	1,295	1,300	1,354	1,619	1,866
Conservative	George Stevenson	32.4	1,088	1,096	1,115	1,280	
Labour	Linda Gow	24.2	813	821	858		
Green	David Robertson	3.7	124	129			
UKIP	Stuart Martin	1.0	35				
Electorate: TBC Valid: 3,355 Spoilt: 30 Quota: 1,678 Turnout: 3,385 (26.5%)

=== 2017 Election ===
2017 Falkirk Council election

Bonnybridge and Larbert - 3 seats
Party	Candidate	FPv%	Count					
Party	Candidate	FPv%	1	2	3	4	5	6
SNP	Tom Coleman (incumbent)†	33.7	1,898					
Conservative	David Grant	24.31	1,368	1,389.43	1,404.2	1,427.07		
Independent	Billy Buchanan (incumbent)	20.15	1,134	1,225.91	1,271.58	1,394.9	1,400.54	1,902.47
Labour	Linda Gow (incumbent)	15.71	884	963.51	992.13	1,110.3	1,115.96	
Green	David Robertson	3.84	216	384.58	417.2			
Independent	Janine Rennie	2.27	128	153.3				
Electorate: TBC Valid: 5,628 Spoilt: 51 Quota: 1,408 Turnout: 5,679 (45.1%)

=== 2012 Election ===
2012 Falkirk Council election

Bonnybridge and Larbert - 3 seats
Party	Candidate	FPv%	Count			
Party	Candidate	FPv%	1	2	3	4
SNP	Tom Coleman (incumbent)	30.95	1,387			
Labour	Linda Gow (incumbent)	27.56	1,235			
Independent	Billy Buchanan (incumbent)	22.72	1,018	1,042.7	1,073.3	1,138.4
Conservative	Elliot Roy	8.39	379	385	394.2	430.1
SNP	Lynda Kenna *	6.67	299	493.8	512.9	560.8
Independent	Chris Harley	3.70	166	176.7	192.6	
Electorate: 11,746 Valid: 4,481 Spoilt: 71 Quota: 1,121 Turnout: 4,552 (38.15%)

=== 2007 Election ===
2007 Falkirk Council election

Bonnybridge and Larbert
Party	Candidate	FPv%	%	Seat	Count
SNP	Tom Coleman	1,916	31.2	1	1
Independent	Billy Buchanan	1,566	25.5	2	1
Labour	Linda Gow	1,557	25.4	3	1
Conservative	Juliet Martin	576	9.4		
Green	David George Robertson	302	4.9		
Independent	Denis Shovlin	143	2.3		
Scottish Socialist	David Fowler	72	1.2		
