= 1984 Falkirk District Council election =

1984 Scottish local government election

| ← 1980 | 3 May 1984 | 1988 → |

All 36 seats to Falkirk District Council 19 seats needed for a majority
| | First party | Second party |
|---|---|---|
| Party | Labour | SNP |
| Last election | 27 seats, 52.7% | 4 seats, 31.7% |
| Seats won | 25 | 7 |
| Seat change | ▼2 | ▲3 |
| Popular vote | 23,219 | 13,833 |
| Percentage | 52.8% | 31.4% |
| Swing | ▲0.1% | ▼0.3% |
| | Third party | Fourth party |
| Party | Conservative | Independent |
| Last election | 2 seats, 7.9% | 2 seats, 6.8% |
| Seats won | 2 | 2 |
| Seat change | Steady | Steady |
| Popular vote | 3,932 | 1,788 |
| Percentage | 8.9% | 4.1% |
| Swing | ▲1.0% | ▼2.7% |

Elections to Falkirk District Council took place on 3 May 1984, alongside elections to the councils of Scotland's 53 other districts. There were 36 wards, which each elected a single member using the first-past-the-post voting system.

== Results ==
1984 Falkirk District Council election result
| Party | Seats | Gains | Losses | Net gain/loss | Seats % | Votes % | Votes | +/− |
|---|---|---|---|---|---|---|---|---|
| Labour | 25 | 2 | 4 | ▼2 | 69.4 | 52.8 | 23,219 | ▲0.1 |
| SNP | 7 | 3 | 0 | ▲3 | 19.4 | 31.4 | 13,833 | ▼0.3 |
| Conservative | 2 | 1 | 1 | Steady | 5.6 | 8.9 | 3,932 | ▲1.0 |
| Independent | 2 | 0 | 0 | Steady | 5.6 | 4.1 | 1,788 | ▼2.7 |
| Alliance | 0 | 0 | 0 | Steady | 0.0 | 1.9 | 820 | ▲1.0 |
| Independent Labour | 0 | 0 | 1 | ▼1 | 0.0 | 0.9 | 405 | ▲0.9 |
