= 1980 Falkirk District Council election =

1980 Scottish local government election

← 1977	1 May 1980	1984 →

All 36 seats to Falkirk District Council 19 seats needed for a majority
	First party	Second party	Third party
Party	Labour	SNP	Conservative
Last election	8 seats, 31.0%	22 seats, 47.2%	2 seats, 6.3%
Seats won	27	4	2
Seat change	▲19	▼18	Steady
Popular vote	24,071	14,477	3,587
Percentage	52.7%	31.7%	7.9%
Swing	▲21.7%	▼15.5%	▲1.6%
	Fourth party	Fifth party
Party	Independent	Independent Labour
Last election	4 seats, 14.1%	Did not contest
Seats won	2	1
Seat change	▼2	▲1
Popular vote	3,115	0
Percentage	6.8%	0.0%
Swing	▼7.3%	New

Elections to Falkirk District Council took place on 1 May 1980, alongside elections to the councils of Scotland's 53 other districts. There were 36 wards, which each elected a single member using the first-past-the-post voting system.

== Results ==
1980 Falkirk District Council election result
Party	Seats	Gains	Losses	Net gain/loss	Seats %	Votes %	Votes	+/−
Labour	27	19	0	▲19	75.0	52.7	24,071	▲21.7
SNP	4	0	18	▼18	11.1	31.7	14,477	▼15.5
Conservative	2	2	2	Steady	5.6	7.9	3,587	▲1.6
Independent	2	1	3	▼2	5.6	6.8	3,115	▼7.3
Independent Labour	1	1	0	▲1	2.8	0.0	0	New
Liberal	0	0	0	Steady	0.0	0.9	398	▲0.2
