= Bo'ness and Blackness (ward) =

Electoral ward in Falkirk, Scotland

Location of the ward

Bo'ness and Blackness is one of the nine wards used to elect members of the Falkirk Council. It elects three Councillors.

== Councillors ==
Election	Councillors		
2007	Adrian Mahoney (Labour)	John Constable (SNP)	Harry Constable (SNP)
2009 by	Adrian Mahoney (Labour)	John Constable (SNP)	Ann Ritchie (SNP/ Ind.)
2011 by	Adrian Mahoney (Labour)	Sandy Turner (SNP)	Ann Ritchie (SNP/ Ind.)
2012	Adrian Mahoney (Labour)	Sandy Turner (SNP)	Ann Ritchie (SNP/ Ind.)
2017	David Aichison (Labour)	Lynn Munro (Conservative)	Ann Ritchie (SNP/ Ind.)
2022	David Aichison (Labour)	Stacey Devine (SNP)	Ann Ritchie (SNP/ Ind.)

== Election results ==
=== 2022 Election ===
2022 Falkirk Council election

Bo'ness and Blackness - 3 seats
Party	Candidate	FPv%	Count				
Party	Candidate	FPv%	1	2	3	4	5
Independent	Ann Ritchie (incumbent)	40.58	2,262				
SNP	Stacey Devine	21.56	1,212	1,434.54			
Labour	David Aitchison (incumbent)	18.68	1,041	1,229.03	1,238.47		
Conservative	Lynn Munro (incumbent)	15.12	843	950.83	951.93	984.18	995.82
Green	Debra Pickering	2.44	136	136	193.94	245.43	211.02
Liberal Democrats	Nicholas William Pitts	1.61	90	125.3	126.18		
Electorate: 12,389 Valid: 5,574 Spoilt: 70 Quota: 1,394 Turnout: 45.6%

=== 2017 Election ===
2017 Falkirk Council election

Bo'ness and Blackness - 3 seats
Party	Candidate	FPv%	Count			
Party	Candidate	FPv%	1	2	3	4
SNP	Ann Ritchie (incumbent)	27.97	1,510			
Conservative	Lynn Munro	26.15	1,412			
Labour	David Aitchison	20.49	1,106	1,116.38	1,130.17	1,381.23
SNP	Alan Gilbert	14.1	761	880.73	882.71	892.69
Green	Mari-Ellena Corvi	5.78	312	324.72	333.19	360.08
Labour	Michael Burnett	5.52	298	302.24	312.82	
Electorate: TBC Valid: 5,399 Spoilt: 137 Quota: 1350 Turnout: 5,536 (46.8%)

=== 2012 Election ===
2012 Falkirk Council election

Bo'ness and Blackness - 3 seats
Party	Candidate	FPv%	Count			
Party	Candidate	FPv%	1	2	3	4
SNP	Ann Ritchie (incumbent)	37.67	1,526			
Labour	Adrian Mahoney (incumbent)	21.03	852	900.1	1,010.8	1,780.8
Labour	David Aitchison	20.39	826	850.9	910.2	
SNP	Sandy Turner (incumbent)	11.40	462	848.3	915.9	956.1
Conservative	Lynn Munro	9.50	385	401.5		
Electorate: 11,250 Valid: 4,051 Spoilt: 79 Quota: 1,013 Turnout: 4,130 (36.01%)

=== 2007 Election ===
2007 Falkirk Council election

Bo'ness and Blackness
Party	Candidate	FPv%	%	Seat	Count
SNP	Harry Constable	1,723	27.6	1	1
Labour	Adrian Mahoney	1,460	23.4	2	4
SNP	John Constable	1,221	19.6	3	6
Conservative	Lynn Edith Munro	793	12.7		
Labour	Ken Wright	532	8.5		
Independent	Rob Willox	268	4.3		
Scottish Socialist	Garry Chapman	239	3.8		
