= 2022 Falkirk Council election =

Falkirk Council election

- 5 May 2022

All 30 seats to Falkirk Council 16 seats needed for a majority
	First party	Second party
Leader	Cecil Meiklejohn	Robert Bissett
Party	SNP	Labour
Leader's seat	Falkirk North	Falkirk North
Last election	12 seats, 38.8%	9 seats, 23.1%
Seats before	12	7
Seats after	12	9
Popular vote	21,066	12,179
Percentage	39.7%	23.0%
Swing	▲0.9%	▼0.1%
	Third party	Fourth party
Leader	James Kerr	N/A
Party	Conservative	Independent
Leader's seat	Upper Braes
Last election	7 seats, 24.5%	2 seats, 9.8%
Seats before	7	4
Seats after	5	4
Popular vote	10,326	6,018
Percentage	19.5%	11.4%
Swing	▼5.0%	▲1.6%
- Results of the 2022 Falkirk Council Election by wards.

Council Leader before election
Cecil Meiklejohn
SNP
Council Leader after election
Cecil Meiklejohn
SNP

The 2022 Falkirk Council election was held on 5 May 2022 on the same day as the 31 other Scottish local government elections. The election used the nine wards created following the Local Government Boundary Commission for Scotland's 5th Review, with 30 councillors being elected. Each ward elected either three or four members, using the STV electoral system.

At the last election in 2017, the Scottish National Party (SNP) won the most seats and formed a minority administration.

== Background ==
=== Previous election ===
At the previous election in 2017, the Scottish National Party (SNP) became the largest party, despite losing one seat, overtaking Labour who lost five seats. Two independents were elected, one less than 2012 while the Conservatives gained five seats.

2017 Falkirk Council election result
Party	Seats	Gains	Losses	Net gain/loss	Seats %	Votes %	Votes	+/−
SNP	12	Steady	1	▼1	40.0	38.8	20,861	▼1.6
Labour	9	Steady	5	▼5	30.0	23.1	12,421	▼14.6
Conservative	7	5	Steady	▲5	23.3	24.5	13,168	▲13.3
Independent	2	Steady	1	▼1	6.7	9.8	5,308	▼0.7
Green	0	Steady	Steady	Steady	0.0	3.6	1,933	New
Total	30						53,754	

Notes

- Votes are the sum of first preference votes across all council wards. The net gain/loss and percentage changes relate to the result of the previous Scottish local elections in May 2012. This is because STV has an element of proportionality which is not present unless multiple seats are being elected. This may differ from other published sources showing gain/loss relative to seats held at dissolution of Scotland's councils.
- Following boundary changes, the number of seats in Falkirk fell from 32 in 2012 to 30 in 2017. Gains and losses are represented against national results which may differ from other published sources.

=== Composition ===
Since the previous election, several changes in the composition of the council occurred. Labour councillor John McLuckie and Conservative councillor James Kerr were suspended by their respective parties after having been charged by the police following an investigation into planning irregularities in Falkirk. SNP councillor Niall Coleman resigned from the party to become an independent. Two by-elections were held and resulted in an SNP hold and an SNP gain from Labour.

Party	2017 result	Dissolution
SNP	12	12
Labour	9	7
Conservative	7	7
Independents	2	4

=== Retiring councillors ===
Ward	Party	Retiring councillor
Grangemouth	Labour	Allyson Black
Denny and Banknock	Labour	Jim Blackwood
Carse, Kinnaird and Tryst	Labour	Joan Coombes
Bonnybridge and Larbert	Independent	Niall Coleman
Falkirk North	SNP	David Alexander
Falkirk North	Independent	Dennis Goldie
Falkirk South	Conservative	John Patrick
Lower Braes	Conservative	Malcolm Nicol
Upper Braes	SNP	Gordon Hughes

== Results ==
2022 Falkirk Council election
Party	Seats	Gains	Losses	Net gain/loss	Seats %	Votes %	Votes	+/−
SNP	12	0	0	0	40.0	39.7	21,066	▲0.9
Labour	9	▲1	▼1	0	30.0	23.0	12,179	▼0.1
Conservative	5	▲1	▼3	▼2	16.7	19.5	10,326	▼5.0
Independent	4	▲2	0	▲2	13.3	11.4	6,018	▲1.6
Green	0	0	0	0	0.0	4.5	2,365	▲0.9
Liberal Democrats	0	0	0	0	0.0	1.1	603	New
Alba	0	0	0	0	0.0	0.8	424	New
UKIP	0	0	0	0	0.0	0.1	27	0.0
Total	30						53,008	

=== Ward summary ===
Results of the 2022 Falkirk Council election by ward
Ward	%	Cllrs	%	Cllrs	%	Cllrs	%	Cllrs	%	Cllrs	%	Cllrs	%	Cllrs	%	Cllrs	Total Cllrs
Ward	SNP		Lab		Conservative		Green		Lib Dem		Ind		Alba		Others		Total Cllrs
Bo'ness and Blackness	21.74	1	18.64	1	15.12	0	2.44	0	1.61	0	40.58	1					3
Grangemouth	44.85	1	23.38	1	15.23	0	2.42	0			15.06	1			0.54	0	3
Denny and Banknock	46.49	2	20.66	1	16.16	0	3.15	0			13.54	1					4
Carse, Kinnaird and Tryst	44.37	2	24.55	1	24.06	1	4.14	0	2.88	0							4
Bonnybridge and Larbert	33.88	1	17.60	1	18.41	0	4.91	0			25.22	1					3
Falkirk North	47.41	2	28.86	1	13.27	1	5.90	0					4.55	0			4
Falkirk South	41.66	1	22.34	1	28.56	1	5.67	0			1.77	0					3
Lower Braes	39.35	1	27.00	1	23.34	1	5.78	0	3.24	0			1.30	0			3
Upper Braes	34.88	1	23.13	1	21.86	1	5.60	0	2.53	0	10.88	0	1.15	0			3
Total																	30

== Ward results ==
=== Bo'ness and Blackness ===
- 2012: 2xSNP; 1xLab
- 2017: 1xSNP; 1xLab; 1xCon
- 2022: 1xSNP; 1xLab; 1xIndependent
- 2017-2022 Change: Independent gain one seat from Conservative

Bo'ness and Blackness - 3 seats
Party	Candidate	FPv%	Count				
Party	Candidate	FPv%	1	2	3	4	5
Independent	Ann Ritchie (incumbent)	40.51	2,262				
SNP	Stacey Devine	21.70	1,212	1,434.54			
Labour	David Aitchison (incumbent)	18.64	1,041	1,229.03	1,238.47		
Conservative	Lynn Munro (incumbent)	15.10	843	950.83	951.93	984.18	995.82
Green	Debra Pickering	2.44	136	136	193.94	245.43	211.02
Liberal Democrats	Nicholas William Pitts	1.61	90	125.3	126.18		
Electorate: 12,389 Valid: 5,584 Spoilt: 70 Quota: 1,394 Turnout: 45.6%

=== Grangemouth ===
- 2012: 2xLab; 1xSNP; 1xIndependent
- 2017: 1xSNP; 1xLab; 1xIndependent
- 2022: 1xSNP; 1xLab; 1xIndependent
- 2017-2022 Change: No change

Grangemouth - 3 seats
Party	Candidate	FPv%	Count							
Party	Candidate	FPv%	1	2	3	4	5	6	7	8
SNP	David Balfour (incumbent)	35.85	1,808							
Labour	Alan Nimmo	23.38	1,179	1,211.98	1,217.28	1,244.09	1,281.31			
Conservative	Mandy Bryson	13.58	685	694.08	708.01	702.38	725.98	729.38		
Independent	Robert Spears (incumbent)	12.12	611	645.79	647.79	668.61	731.75	738.42	1,071.96	1,391.08
SNP	John Haston	9.00	454	873.93	876.23	942.91	960.45	962.68	984.84	
Independent	Marc Bozza	3.11	157	165.78	169.77	176.68				
Green	Rhys Stenhouse	2.42	122	137.73	138.43					
UKIP	Martin Stuart	0.54	27	27.61						
Electorate: 12,741 Valid: 5,043 Spoilt: 161 Quota: 1,261 Turnout: 40.5%

=== Denny and Banknock ===
- 2012: 2xSNP; 1xLab 1xIndependent
- 2017: 2xSNP; 1xLab; 1xCon
- 2022: 2xSNP; 1xLab; 1xIndependent
- 2017-2022 Change: Independent gain one seat from Conservative

Denny and Banknock - 4 seats
Party	Candidate	FPv%	Count						
Party	Candidate	FPv%	1						
SNP	Paul Garner (incumbent)	29.42	1,868						
SNP	Fiona Collie (incumbent)	17.07	1,084	1,571.69					
Conservative	Nigel Harris (incumbent)	16.16	1,026	1,033.67	1,041.5	1,056.96	1,073.66	1,092.16	
Labour	Alf Kelly	14.00	889	903.71	935.17	1,011.42	1,368.98		
Independent	Brian McCabe	13.54	860	890.68	929.43	1,031.31	1,072.02	1,106.23	1,610.76
Labour	James Marshall	6.66	423	433.27	444.87	461.56			
Green	Rachel Hart	3.15	200	223.01	346.01				
Electorate: 15,534 Valid: 6,350 Spoilt: 128 Quota: 1,271 Turnout: 43.8%

=== Carse, Kinnaird and Tryst ===
- 2012: 2xLab; 2xSNP
- 2017: 2xSNP; 1xLab; 1xCon
- 2022: 2xSNP; 1xLab; 1xCon
- 2017-2022 Change: No change

Carse, Kinnaird and Tryst - 4 seats
Party	Candidate	FPv%	Count						
Party	Candidate	FPv%	1	2	3	4	5	6	7
SNP	Gary Bouse (incumbent)	27.32	1,961						
Labour	Margaret Anslow	24.55	1,762	1,762	1,436.				
SNP	Laura Murtagh (incumbent)	17.05	1,224	1,670.56					
Conservative	Jim Flynn (incumbent)	15.06	1,081	1,088.49	1.143.63	1,150.23			
Conservative	Robert Kemp	9.00	646	649.75	674.35	678.09	711.89	778.53	
Green	Tom McLaughlin	4.14	297	326.45	270.98	370.48	492.89	610.00	
Liberal Democrats	Sean McCay	2.88	207	215.57	278.97	314.47			
Electorate: 17,252 Valid: 7,178 Spoilt: 156 Quota: 1,436 Turnout: 42.5%

=== Bonnybridge and Larbert ===
- 2012: 1xSNP; 1xLab; 1xIndependent
- 2017: 1xSNP; 1xCon; 1xIndependent
- 2022: 1xIndependent; 1xSNP; 1xLab
- 2017-2022 Change: Labour gain one seat from Conservative

Bonnybridge and Larbert - 3 seats
Party	Candidate	FPv%	Count					
Party	Candidate	FPv%	1	2	3	4	5	6
Independent	Billy Buchanan (incumbent)	25.22	1,423					
SNP	Bryan Deakin	21.48	1,212	1,214.26	1,276.53	1,988.19		
Conservative	David Grant (incumbent)	18.39	1,038	1,040.52	1,056.57	1,064.59	1,084.79	
Labour	Jack Redmond	17.60	993	996.38	1,072.64	1,111.79	1,327.54	1,942.15
SNP	Jim Muir	12.40	700	700.94	797.07			
Green	David Robertson	4.91	277	277.94				
Electorate: 13,094 Valid: 5,643 Spoilt: 87 Quota: 1,411 Turnout: 43.8%

=== Falkirk North ===
- 2012: 2xSNP; 2xLab
- 2017: 2xSNP; 2xLab
- 2022: 2xSNP; 1xLab; 1xCon
- 2017-2022 Change: Conservative gain one seat from Labour

Falkirk North - 4 seats
Party	Candidate	FPv%	Count						
Party	Candidate	FPv%	1	2	3	4	5	6	7
SNP	Cecil Meiklejohn (incumbent)	35.01	2,260						
Labour	Robert Bissett (incumbent)	22.68	1,464						
Conservative	James Bundy	13.27	857	863.85	867.95	880.64	912.95	947.87	1,277.89
SNP	Iain Sinclair	12.41	801	1,625.50					
Labour	Robbie Burgess	6.18	399	423.41	466.48	604.17	651.31	929.0	
Green	Judith McLaughlin	5.90	381	424.26	553.38	557.96	631.1		
Alba	Zohaib Arshad	4.55	294	307.28	345.31	348.36			
Electorate: 16,749 Valid: 6,456 Spoilt: 174 Quota: 1,292 Turnout: 39.6%

=== Falkirk South ===
- 2012: 2xLab; 1xSNP; 1xCon
- 2017: 1xLab; 1xSNP; 1xCon
- 2022: 1xSNP; 1xCon; 1xLab
- 2017-2022 Change: No change

Falkirk South - 3 seats
Party	Candidate	FPv%	Count				
Party	Candidate	FPv%	1	2	3	4	5
SNP	Lorna Binnie (incumbent)	30.18	1,843				
Conservative	Sarah Patrick	28.56	1,744				
Labour	Euan Stainbank	22.34	1,364	1,380.46	1,478.63	1,524.51	1,652.32
SNP	Emma Russell (incumbent)	11.48	701	959.03	964.61	977.33	
Green	Hunter Thomson	5.67	346	359.16	377.86	408.23	
Independent	Richard Wilson	1.77	108	111.09	138.58		
Electorate: 13,395 Valid: 6,106 Spoilt: 102 Quota: 1,527 Turnout: 46.3%

=== Lower Braes ===
- 2012: 1xCon; 1xSNP; 1xLab
- 2017: 1xCon; 1xSNP; 1xLab
- 2022: 1xLab; 1xSNP; 1xCon
- 2017-2022 Change: No change

Lower Braes - 3 seats
Party	Candidate	FPv%	Count					
Party	Candidate	FPv%	1	2	3	4	5	6
Labour	Anne Hannah	27.00	1,393					
SNP	Gordon Forrest	23.36	1,205	1,213.21	1,237.65	1,248.06	1,330.98	
Conservative	James Kerr	23.34	1,204	1,225.29	1,237.65	1,297.984	1,330.97	
SNP	Adanna McCue (incumbent)	15.99	825	830.32	841.55	848.75	848.91	
Green	Doug Sheehan	5.78	298	309.76	378.19	320.97		
Liberal Democrats	Hunter Ashley	3.24	167	195.32	201.86			
Alba	Scott Fallon	1.30	67	69.44				
Electorate: 12,003 Valid: 5,159 Spoilt: 48 Quota: 1,290 Turnout: 43.6%

=== Upper Braes ===
- 2012: 2xLab; 1xSNP
- 2017: 1xCon; 1xSNP; 1xLab
- 2022: 1xSNP; 1xLab; 1xCon
- 2017-2022 Change: No change

Upper Braes - 3 seats
Party	Candidate	FPv%	Count							
Party	Candidate	FPv%	1							
SNP	Jim Robertson	34.88	1,918							
Labour	Siobhan Paterson	23.13	1,272	1,365.42	1,370.55	1,384.12				
Conservative	Claire Brown	21.86	1,202	1,214.45	1,219.45	1,224.46	1,225.95	1,233.53	1,259.08	1,406.68
Independent	John McLuckie (incumbent)	8.35	459	489.57	499.27	548.80	550.05	568.17	603.26	
Green	Rachel Kidd	5.60	308	516.93	520.78	535.32	536.81	586.76	644.66	740.41
Liberal Democrats	Austin Reid	2.53	139	161.65	161.65	168.21	170.22	177.23		
Independent	Ian Kennedy	1.62	89	98.34	114.04					
Alba	Colin Todd	1.15	63	110.56	114.13	118.13	118.39			
Independent	Mark Tunnicliff	0.89	49	55.23						
Electorate: 12,734 Valid: 5,499 Spoilt: 79 Quota: 1,375 Turnout: 43.8%

== Aftermath ==
=== Falkirk South by-election ===
In July 2024, Labour councillor Euan Stainbank was elected as MP for Falkirk at the 2024 United Kingdom general election and subsequently resigned as a councillor in August 2024. A by-election was held on 17 October 2024 and was won by Labour candidate Claire Aitken.

Falkirk South (17 October 2024) – 1 seat
Party	Candidate	FPv%	Count						
Party	Candidate	FPv%	1	2	3	4	5	6	7
SNP	Carol Anne Beattie	31.3	1,043	1,048	1,113	1,156	1,189	1,218	
Labour	Claire Aitken	30.5	1,014	1,048	1,090	1,132	1,161	1,329	1,724
Conservative	David Grant	14.7	488	498	503	524	652		
Reform	Stuart Martin	9.9	330	341	343	371			
Independent	Sharron McKean	5.5	184	199	216				
Green	Tom McLaughlin	4.5	151	161					
Liberal Democrats	Sean McCay	3.6	119						
Electorate: 13,528 Valid: 3,329 Spoilt: 36 Quota: 1,665 Turnout: 24.9%

== Notes ==
1. LOB: Sitting councillor for Lower Braes.
2. UPB: Sitting councillor for Upper Braes.
