= 1995 Falkirk Council election =

1995 Scottish local government election

← 1992 (As Falkirk District Council)	5 April 1995	1999 →

All 36 seats to Falkirk Council 19 seats needed for a majority
	First party	Second party
Party	Labour	SNP
Last election	16 seats, 43.1%	14 seats, 39.3%
Seats won	23	8
Seat change	▲7	▼6
Popular vote	25,942	18,260
Percentage	52.0%	36.6%
Swing	▲8.9%	▼2.7%
	Third party	Fourth party
Party	Independent	Conservative
Last election	3 seats, 6.3%	3 seats, 9.7%
Seats won	3	2
Seat change	Steady	▼1
Popular vote	3,791	1,813
Percentage	7.6%	3.6%
Swing	▲1.3%	▼6.1%

Elections to Falkirk Council took place on 6 April 1995, alongside elections to the councils of Scotland's various other new 28 unitary authorities.

== Results ==
1995 Falkirk Council election result
Party	Seats	Gains	Losses	Net gain/loss	Seats %	Votes %	Votes	+/−
Labour	23	-	-	▲7	63.9	52.0	25,942	▲8.9
SNP	8	-	-	▼6	22.2	36.6	18,260	▼2.7
Independent	3	-	-	Steady	8.3	7.6	3,791	▲1.3
Conservative	2	-	-	▼1	5.6	3.6	1,813	▼6.1
Liberal Democrats	0	-	-	Steady	0.0	0.1	71	▼1.7
