= Euan Stainbank =

Scottish politician (born 2000)

Euan Stainbank MP
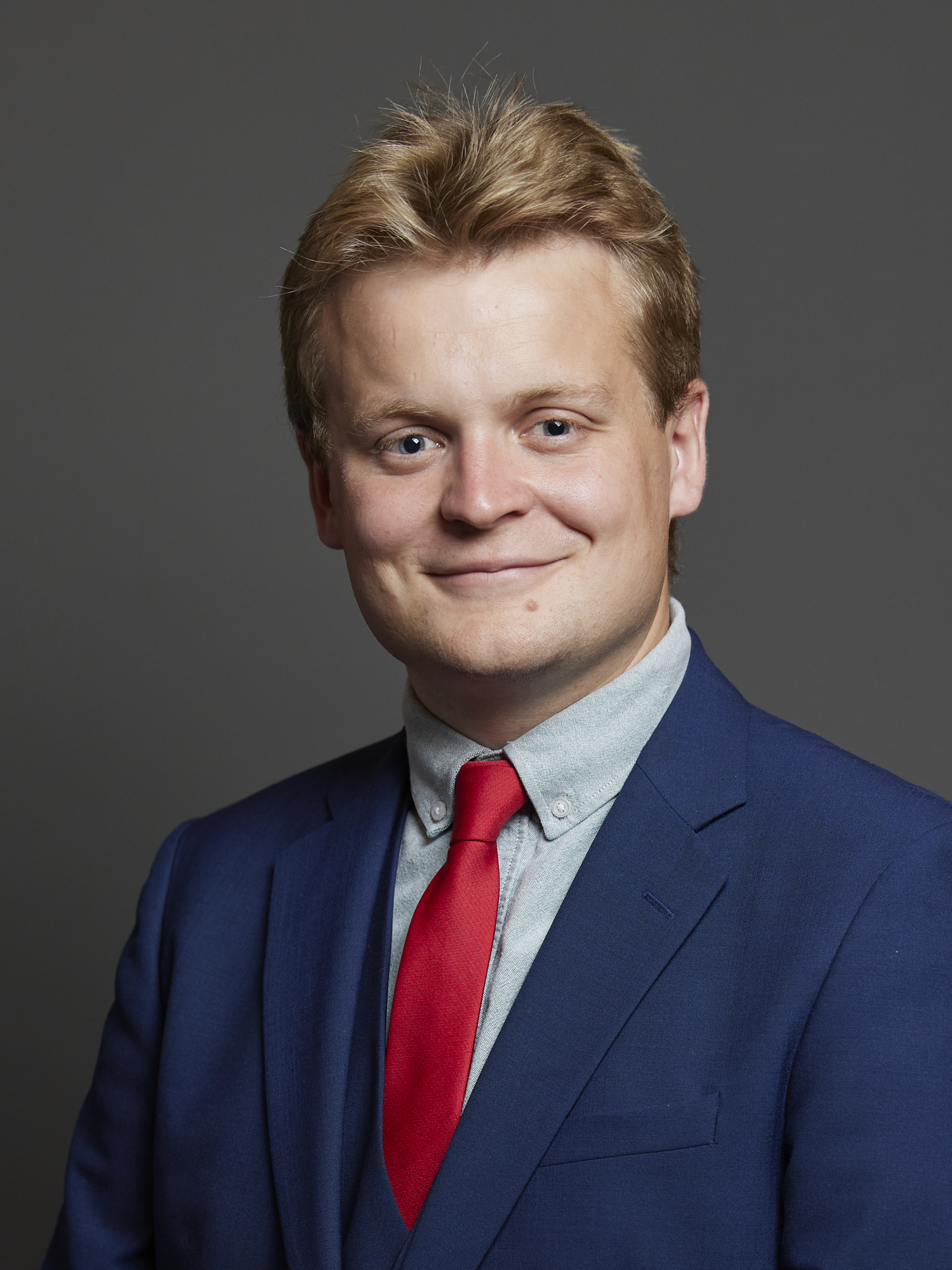

Member of Parliament for Falkirk
- Incumbent
- Assumed office 4 July 2024
- Preceded by: John McNally
- Majority: 4,996 (11.7%)

Personal details
- Born: 27 January 2000 (age 26) Falkirk, Scotland
- Party: Labour
- Education: University of Stirling

Euan Stainbank (born 27 January 2000) is a Scottish Labour politician who is the Member of Parliament (MP) for Falkirk since 2024.

== Early life ==
He graduated from the University of Stirling in 2021 with an LLB in Scots Law. "During his time at the university, he was president of both the Debating and Law societies, which won him the Best Society President award", according to the University of Stirling's student paper.

== Political career ==
Elected at the age of 24, he is currently Scotland's youngest serving MP. He was elected in the 2022 Falkirk Council election in Falkirk South ward. He served as deputy leader of the Labour group.

Along with Brian Leishman, he was one of two Scottish Labour MPs not to vote to cut the Winter Fuel Payment in the 2024 parliament vote.

In the 2025 Labour Party deputy leadership election, he nominated Bell Ribeiro-Addy.

On 10 May 2026, he called on Keir Starmer to resign following the 2026 local elections.
