= Bantaskine =

Park and estate in Falkirk, Scotland

Coordinates: 55°59′32″N 3°48′44″W

- Interactive map of Bantaskine
- Location: Falkirk, Scotland

Bantaskine is a park with woodlands in Falkirk, Scotland that was formerly the Bantaskine Estate, a coal mining estate. The artist Mary Georgina Wade Wilson grew up there. The Battle of Falkirk Muir was fought nearby. It is also known as South Bantaskine. North Bantaskine, on the other side of the Union Canal, was an agricultural estate. South Bantaskine is listed as a historically significant archeological site by Historic Environment Scotland.

== Etymology ==
The name may be from the Welsh language words for a rise and a hollow, signifying a rise over a hollow.

== History ==
The property was owned by a merchant operating in West Indian territories, Thomas Campbell Hagart. A brickworks was also on the property.

=== Wilson family ===
The Bantaskine estate was held by the Wilson coal magnate family. Robert Wilson established the estate as part of his coal mining empire. After his death, his 21-year-old son and future MP John Wilson (1815 - 1883) took over running the estate. He had eight daughters and a son. The stained glass windows from a mansion that once stood in the property are preserved at a local shopping center.

Robert Moffat stayed at the estate several times. It had substantial landscaping and gardens. Miss Wilson used them as a subject of her paintings.
