= 1999 Falkirk Council election =

1999 Scottish local government election

← 1995	6 May 1999	2003 →

All 32 seats to Falkirk Council 17 seats needed for a majority
	First party	Second party	Third party
Party	Labour	SNP	Independent
Last election	23 seats, 52.0%	8 seats, 36.6%	3 seats, 7.6%
Seats won	15	9	5
Seat change	▼8	▲1	▲2
Popular vote	28,663	22,438	8,941
Percentage	41.8%	32.7%	13.0%
Swing	▼10.2%	▼3.9%	▲5.4%
	Fourth party	Fifth party
Party	Conservative	Independent Labour
Last election	2 seats, 3.6%	Did not contest
Seats won	2	1
Seat change	Steady	▲1
Popular vote	4,114	839
Percentage	6.0%	1.2%
Swing	▲2.4%	New
- Results by ward

Elections to Falkirk Council took place on 6 May 1999, alongside elections to the councils of Scotland's various other 31 unitary authorities. There were 32 wards - 4 less than in 1995.

== Results ==
1999 Falkirk Council election result
Party	Seats	Gains	Losses	Net gain/loss	Seats %	Votes %	Votes	+/−
Labour	15	-	-	▼8	46.9	41.8	28,663	▼10.2
SNP	9	-	-	▲1	28.1	32.7	22,438	▼3.9
Independent	5	-	-	▲2	15.6	13.0	8,941	▲5.4
Conservative	2	-	-	Steady	6.3	6.0	4,114	▲2.4
Independent Labour	1	-	-	▲1	3.1	1.2	839	New
Liberal Democrats	0	-	-	Steady	0.0	3.6	2,467	▲3.5
Socialist Labour	0	-	-	Steady	0.0	1.5	1,001	New
Scottish Socialist	0	-	-	Steady	0.0	0.2	106	New
