= Carse, Kinnaird and Tryst (ward) =

Electoral ward in Scotland

Location of the ward

Carse, Kinnaird and Tryst is one of the nine wards used to elect members of the Falkirk Council. It elects four Councillors.

== Councillors ==
Election	Councillors			
2007	Charles MacDonald (Labour)	Craig Martin (Labour)	Steven Carleschi (SNP)	Lynda Kenna (SNP)
2012	Charles MacDonald (Labour)	Craig Martin (Labour)	Steven Carleschi (SNP)	Stephen Bird (SNP)
2017	Jim Flynn (Conservative)	Joan Coombes (Labour)	Gary Bouse (SNP)	Laura Murtagh (SNP)
2022	Jim Flynn (Conservative)	Margaret Anslow (Labour)	Gary Bouse (SNP)	Laura Murtagh (SNP)

== Election results ==
=== 2022 Election ===
2022 Falkirk Council election

Carse, Kinnaird and Tryst - 4 seats
Party	Candidate	FPv%	Count						
Party	Candidate	FPv%	1	2	3	4	5	6	7
SNP	Gary Bouse (incumbent)		1,961						
Labour	Margaret Anslow		1,762	1,762	1,436.				
SNP	Laura Murtagh (incumbent)		1,224	1,670.56					
Conservative	Jim Flynn (incumbent)		1,081	1,088.49	1.143.63	1,150.23			
Conservative	Robert Kemp		646	649.75	674.35	678.09	711.89	778.53	
Green	Tom McLaughlin		297	326.45	270.98	370.48	492.89	610.00	
Liberal Democrats	Sean McCay		207	215.57	278.97	314.47			
Electorate: 17,252 Valid: 7,178 Spoilt: 156 Quota: 1,436 Turnout: 42.5%

=== 2017 Election ===
2017 Falkirk Council election

Carse, Kinnaird and Tryst - 4 seats
Party	Candidate	FPv%	Count						
Party	Candidate	FPv%	1	2	3	4	5	6	7
Conservative	Jim Flynn	27.85	1,968						
SNP	Gary Bouse	27.18	1,921						
Labour	Joan Coombes *	13.53	956	1,069.44	1,098.21	1,154.31	1,229.31	1,251.22	2,106.01
SNP	Laura Murtagh	13.3	940	955.48	1,350.04	1,374.34	1,530.07		
Labour	Martin Murray	12.03	850	964.01	980.63	997.67	1,050.7	1,070.97	
Green	Chris Marsh	4.12	291	328.16	358.51	408.87			
Independent	Safia Ali	1.99	141	198.71	206.1				
Electorate: TBC Valid: 7,067 Spoilt: 133 Quota: 1,414 Turnout: 7,200 (44%)

=== 2012 Election ===
2012 Falkirk Council election

Carse, Kinnaird and Tryst - 4 seats
Party	Candidate	FPv%	Count		
Party	Candidate	FPv%	1	2	3
Labour	Charles MacDonald (incumbent)	26.28	1,377		
Labour	Craig Martin (incumbent)	25.42	1,332		
SNP	Stephen Bird	23.61	1,237		
SNP	Steven Carleschi (incumbent)	17.33	908	986.1	1,052.9
Conservative	Jim Flynn	7.35	385	437.3	480.8
Electorate: 14,121 Valid: 5,239 Spoilt: 86 Quota: 1,048 Turnout: 5,325 (37.1%)

=== 2007 Election ===
2007 Falkirk Council election

Carse, Kinnaird and Tryst
Party	Candidate	FPv%	%	Seat	Count
Labour	Charles MacDonald	1,754	25.0	1	1
Labour	Craig Martin	1,546	22.1	2	1
SNP	Steven Carleschi	1,430	20.4	3	1
SNP	Lynda Kenna	1,080	15.4	4	7
Conservative	Jim Flynn	726	10.4		
Independent	Brian Goldie	374	5.3		
Scottish Socialist	Mick McInosh	92	1.3		
