= Falkirk South (ward) =

Electoral ward in Falkirk, Scotland

Location of the ward

Falkirk South is one of the nine wards used to elect members of Falkirk Council. It elects three councillors.

Following the resignation of Pat Reid, a local government by-election will be held on Thursday, 14 October 2021.

== Councillors ==
Election	Councillors			
2007	John Patrick (Conservative)	Georgie Thomson (SNP)	Gerry Goldie (Labour)	Joe Lemetti (Labour)
2012	John Patrick (Conservative)	Colin Chalmers (SNP)	Gerry Goldie (Labour)	Dennis Goldie (Labour)
2017	John Patrick (Conservative)	Lorna Binnie (SNP)	Pat Reid (Labour)	3 seats
2022	Sarah Patrick (Conservative)	Lorna Binnie (SNP)	Euan Stainbank (Labour)	3 seats
2024 by-	Sarah Patrick (Conservative)	Lorna Binnie (SNP)	Claire Aitken (Labour)	3 seats

== Election results ==
=== 2024 By-election ===
Falkirk South (17 October 2024) – 1 seat
Party	Candidate	FPv%	Count						
Party	Candidate	FPv%	1	2	3	4	5	6	7
SNP	Carol Anne Beattie	31.3	1,043	1,048	1,113	1,156	1,189	1,218	
Labour	Claire Aitken	30.5	1,014	1,048	1,090	1,132	1,161	1,329	1,724
Conservative	David Grant	14.7	488	498	503	524	652		
Reform UK	Stuart Martin	9.9	330	341	343	371			
Independent	Sharron McKean	5.5	184	199	216				
Green	Tom McLaughlin	4.5	151	161					
Liberal Democrats	Sean McCay	3.6	119						
Electorate: 13,528 Valid: 3,329 Spoilt: 36 Quota: 1,665 Turnout: 24.9%

=== 2022 Election ===
2022 Falkirk Council election

Falkirk South - 3 seats
Party	Candidate	FPv%	Count				
Party	Candidate	FPv%	1	2	3	4	5
SNP	Lorna Binnie (incumbent)		1,843				
Conservative	Sarah Patrick (incumbent)		1,744				
SNP	Emma Russell		701	959.03	964.61	977.33	
Labour	Euan Stainbank		1,364	1,380.46	1,478.63	1,524.51	1,652.32
Green	Hunter Thomson		346	359.16	377.86	408.23	
Independent	Richard Wilson		108	111.09	138.58		
Electorate: TBC Valid: 6,106 Spoilt: 102 Quota: 1,527 Turnout: 46.3%

=== 2017 Election ===
2017 Falkirk Council election

Falkirk South - 3 seats
Party	Candidate	FPv%	Count
Party	Candidate	FPv%	1
SNP	Lorna Binnie	35.68	2,216
Conservative	John Patrick (incumbent)	32.09	1,993
Labour	Pat Reid *	27.15	1,686
Green	Donnie Buchanan	5.07	315
Electorate: TBC Valid: 6,210 Spoilt: 71 Quota: 1,533 Turnout: 6,281 (48.3%)

=== 2012 Election ===
2012 Falkirk Council election

Falkirk South - 4 seats
Party	Candidate	FPv%	Count						
Party	Candidate	FPv%	1	2	3	4	5	6	7
Labour	Dennis Goldie	23.96	1,279						
SNP	Colin Chalmers	21.74	1,160						
Conservative	John Patrick (incumbent)	15.76	841	844.6	846.9	856.9	984.9	998.4	1,212.7
Labour	Gerry Goldie (incumbent)	15.72	839	1,025.6	1,031.5	1,039.5	1,184.9		
SNP	Georgie Thomson (incumbent)	12.59	672	675.3	748.1	754.7	854.3	874.9	
Independent	Joe Lemetti (incumbent)	8.71	465	472.3	477.6	519.9			
Independent	Hugh McGinlay	1.52	81	81.3	82.4				
Electorate: 13,207 Valid: 5,337 Spoilt: 100 Quota: 1,068 Turnout: 5,437 (40.41%)

=== 2007 Election ===
2007 Falkirk Council election

Falkirk South
Party	Candidate	FPv%	%	Seat	Count
Labour	Gerry Goldie	2,528	33.4	1	1
SNP	Georgie Thomson	2,192	28.9	2	1
Conservative	John Patrick	1,482	19.6	4	2
Labour	Joe Lemetti	853	11.3	3	2
Independent	Ronald Buchanan	390	5.2		
Scottish Socialist	Mark Straub	127	1.7		
