= Falkirk (council area) =

Council area of Scotland

Falkirk: An Eaglais Bhreac (Scottish Gaelic); Fawkirk (Scots)
- Council area
- Coat of arms

- Falkirk shown within Scotland
- Coordinates: 55.976°N 3.797°W
- Sovereign state: United Kingdom
- Country: Scotland
- Lieutenancy area: Stirling and Falkirk
- Unitary authority: 1 April 1996

Government
  - Type: Council
  - Body: Falkirk Council
  - Control: No overall control
  - MPs: 3 MPs: Brian Leishman (L); Euan Stainbank (L); Kirsteen Sullivan (L)
  - MSPs: 2 MSPs: Michelle Thomson (SNP); Michael Matheson (SNP)

Area
  - Total: 115 sq mi (297 km^{2})
  - Rank: 22nd

Population (2025)
  - Total: 160,230
  - Rank: 11th
  - Density: 1,400/sq mi (539/km^{2})
- Time zone: UTC+0 (GMT)
  - Summer (DST): UTC+1 (BST)
- ISO 3166 code: GB-FAL
- GSS code: S12000014
- Website: falkirk.gov.uk

Falkirk (/ˈfɔːlkərk/ FAWL-kurk; Scots: Fawkirk [ˈfɔːkɪrk]; Scottish Gaelic: An Eaglais Bhreac) is one of 32 unitary authority council areas of Scotland. It was formed on 1 April 1996 by way of the Local Government etc. (Scotland) Act 1994 from the exact boundaries of Falkirk District, one of three parts of the Central region created in 1975, which was abolished at that time. Prior to the 1975 reorganisation, the majority of the council area was part of the historic county of Stirlingshire, and a small part, namely Bo'ness and Blackness, was part of the former county of West Lothian.

The council area borders with North Lanarkshire, Stirling and West Lothian, and, across the Firth of Forth to the northeast, Clackmannanshire and Fife. The largest town is Falkirk; other settlements, most of which surround Falkirk within 6 miles (9.7 km) of its centre, include Bo'ness, Bonnybridge, Denny, Grangemouth, Larbert, Polmont, Shieldhill, Camelon and Stenhousemuir.

The council is led by the SNP which won 12 seats in the 2022 Council Election. The incumbent leader of is councillor Cecil Meiklejohn; the provost is Robert Bissett and the deputy provost is David Balfour.

== History ==
The town of Falkirk was made a burgh in 1600, and was then governed by a town council (also known as the corporation) until 1975. Scotland's counties, burghs and landward districts were abolished in 1975 under the Local Government (Scotland) Act 1973, and replaced with upper-tier regions and lower-tier districts. A new Falkirk District was created as one of three districts within the Central Region. The new district was significantly larger than the old Falkirk burgh, covering the whole area of eight former districts and part of a ninth, which were all abolished at the same time:

From Stirlingshire:

- Central No. 2 District, excluding most of Kilsyth parish
- Denny and Dunipace Burgh
- Eastern No. 1 District
- Eastern No. 2 District
- Eastern No. 3 District
- Falkirk Burgh
- Grangemouth Burgh

From West Lothian:

- Bo'ness Burgh
- Bo'ness District

The resulting area could also be defined in terms of parishes as:

- Airth
- Bo'ness and Carriden
- Denny
- Dunipace
- Falkirk
- Grangemouth
- Kilsyth: Banknock polling district only
- Larbert
- Muiravonside
- Slamannan

The new district and its neighbour Stirling were together made a new Stirling and Falkirk lieutenancy area. The last Lord Lieutenant of Stirlingshire became the first Lord Lieutenant of Stirling and Falkirk.

Local government was reformed again in 1996 under the Local Government etc. (Scotland) Act 1994, which abolished the regions and districts which had been created in 1975, replacing them with unitary council areas. Central Region was abolished and each of the area's three districts, including Falkirk, became council areas.

== Demography ==
=== Languages ===
The 2022 Scottish Census reported that out of 154,082 residents aged three and over, 58,016 (37.7%) considered themselves able to speak or read the Scots language."

The 2022 Scottish Census reported that out of 154,077 residents aged three and over, 1,481 (1%) considered themselves able to speak or read Gaelic.

== Settlements ==
The largest settlements in Falkirk

Largest settlements by population:

Settlement	Population (2020)
Falkirk	35,590
Grangemouth	16,120
Bo'ness	14,840
Larbert	12,180
Stenhousemuir	9,620
Denny	8,500
Bonnybridge	5,200
Polmont	5,040
Brightons	4,270
Maddiston	3,910

== Governance ==
Falkirk Council Comhairle na h-Eaglaise Brice

Type
- Type: Unitary authority

Leadership
- Provost: Robert Bissett, Labour since 25 May 2022
- Leader: Cecil Meiklejohn, SNP since 25 May 2017
- Chief Executive: Kenneth Lawrie since August 2018

Structure
- Seats: 30 councillors
- Graph of the party split among 30 seats.
- Political groups: Administration (11) SNP (11) Other parties (19) Labour (8) Conservative (4) Reform (1) Independent (6)
- Length of term: 5 years

Elections
- Voting system: Single transferable vote
- Last election: 5 May 2022
- Next election: 6 May 2027

Meeting place
- Falkirk

Website
- www.falkirk.gov.uk

=== Political control ===
The council has been under no overall control since 1999. The Scottish National Party formed a minority administration following the 2017 election, and continues to run the council as a minority administration following the 2022 election.

The first election to Falkirk District Council was held in 1974, initially operating as a shadow authority alongside the outgoing authorities until the new system came into force on 16 May 1975. A shadow authority was again elected in 1995 ahead of the change to council areas which came into force on 1 April 1996. Political control since 1975 has been as follows:

Falkirk District Council

Party in control	Years
No overall control	1975–1977
SNP	1977–1980
Labour	1980–1992
No overall control	1992–1996

Falkirk Council

Party in control	Years
Labour	1996–1999
No overall control	1999–

=== Leadership ===
The role of provost is largely ceremonial in Falkirk. They chair full council meetings and act as the council's civic figurehead. Political leadership is provided by the leader of the council. The leaders since 1996 have been:

Councillor	Party	From	To
Willie Anderson	Labour	1 Apr 1996	28 Oct 1996
John Connolly	Labour	5 Nov 1996	28 Feb 2001
David Alexander	SNP	28 Feb 2001	May 2007
Linda Gow	Labour	18 May 2007	Jan 2010
Craig Martin	Labour	28 Jan 2010	May 2017
Cecil Meiklejohn	SNP	25 May 2017	

=== Composition ===
Following the 2022 election and subsequent changes of allegiance up to October 2026, the composition of the council was:

Party	Seats
SNP	11
Labour	8
Conservative	4
Reform	1
Independent	6
Total	30

The next election is due in 2027.

=== Premises ===
From the district council's creation in 1975, it was based at the Municipal Buildings on West Bridge Street in Falkirk, which had been built for the former Falkirk Town Council and had been formally opened on 21 January 1966. The building was part of a complex which also included a courthouse, a clinic, and an events venue and theatre called Falkirk Town Hall. Prior to 1966 the town council had been based at the old Municipal Buildings at 12–14 Newmarket Street in the town centre, which had been built in 1879.

After deciding the 1966 building was uneconomic to repair and maintain, the council vacated the Municipal Buildings in 2020 pending their demolition. The attached Falkirk Town Hall closed in 2023. Since 2020, the council's offices have been distributed across several buildings throughout the area. It was subsequently decided to build a new headquarters on the site of the former Callendar Square shopping centre in central Falkirk. Work began on the site in May 2024, and the new building is projected to be completed in 2027.

== Elections ==
Since 2007 elections have been held every five years under the single transferable vote system, introduced by the Local Governance (Scotland) Act 2004. Election results since 1995 have been as follows:

Year	Seats	SNP	Labour	Conservative	Independent / Other	Notes
1995	36	8	23	2	3	
1999	32	9	15	2	6	New ward boundaries.
2003	32	9	14	2	7	
2007	32	13	14	2	3	New ward boundaries.
2012	32	13	14	2	3	
2017	30	12	9	7	2	New ward boundaries.
2022	30	12	9	5	4	

=== Wards ===
Map of the area's wards (2017 configuration)

For the purposes of elections to Falkirk Council, the area is divided geographically into a number of wards which then elect either three or four councillors each by the Single Transferable Vote system. The electoral system of local councils in Scotland is governed by the Local Governance (Scotland) Act 2004, an Act of the Scottish Parliament which first introduced proportional representation to councils. These electoral wards are as follows:

Ward number	Name	Location	Seats
1	Bo'ness and Blackness		3
2	Grangemouth		3
3	Denny and Banknock		4
4	Carse, Kinnaird and Tryst		4
5	Bonnybridge and Larbert		3
6	Falkirk North		4
7	Falkirk South		3
8	Lower Braes		3
9	Upper Braes		3

== Communities ==
The area is divided into 23 community council areas, eleven of which have community councils as at 2023, being those with asterisks.

- Airth Parish*
- Avonbridge and Standburn
- Banknock, Haggs and Longcroft*
- Blackness*
- Bonnybridge
- Bo'ness*
- Brightons*
- Camelon, Bantaskine and Tamfourhill*
- Carron and Carronshore
- Denny and District*
- Falkirk Central
- Falkirk South
- Grahamston, Middlefield and Westfield
- Grangemouth*
- Langlees, Bainsford and New Carron
- Larbert, Stenhousemuir and Torwood
- Lower Braes
- Maddiston
- Polmont*
- Reddingmuirhead and Wallacestone*
- Shieldhill and California
- Slamannan and Limerigg*
- Whitecross
