= 2017 Falkirk Council election =

2017 Scottish local government election

- 4 May 2017

All 30 seats to Falkirk Council 16 seats needed for a majority
	First party	Second party	Third party
Leader	Cecil Meiklejohn	Craig Martin	John Patrick
Party	SNP	Labour	Conservative
Leader's seat	Falkirk North	Carse, Kinnaird & Tryst	Falkirk South
Last election	13 seats, 40.6%	14 seats, 43.8%	2 seats, 6.3%
Seats before	13	14	2
Seats won	13	14	2
Seats after	12	9	7
Seat change	-1	-5	+5
	Fourth party
Leader	Billy Buchannan
Party	Independent
Leader's seat	Bonnybridge and Larbert
Last election	3 seats, 9.4%
Seats before	1
Seats won	3
Seats after	2
Seat change	-1
Council Leader before election
Craig Martin
Labour
Council Leader after election
Cecil Meiklejohn
SNP

2017 Elections to Falkirk Council were held on 4 May 2017, the same day as the 31 other local authorities in Scotland. The election used the nine wards created under the Local Governance (Scotland) Act 2004, with 30 councillors being elected, a reduction of 2 members from 2012. Each ward elected either 3 or 4 members, using the STV electoral system.

Following the 2012 election, the controlling administration consisted of 14 Labour members, 2 Conservatives and 1 Independent (Cllr Buchanan). Opposition is 13 SNP members and 2 Independent (Cllrs Spears and McCabe). The Council Leader is Cllr Craig C Martin, Provost is Cllr Reid and the Depute Provost Cllr Patrick.

== Election result summary ==
Falkirk local election result 2017
Party	Seats	Gains	Losses	Net gain/loss	Seats %	Votes %	Votes	+/−
SNP	12	0	1	-1	40.0	38.8	20,861	
Labour	9	0	5	-5	30.0	23.1	12,421	
Conservative	7	5	0	+5	23.3	24.5	13,168	
Independent	2	0	1	-1	6.7	9.8	5,308	
Green	-	-	-	-	0.0	3.6	1,933	
Other parties	-	-	-	-	0.0	0.1	63	

Note: "Votes" are the first preference votes. The net gain/loss and percentage changes relate to the result of the previous Scottish local elections in May 2012. The number of Falkirk Council seats was reduced by 2 in the 2017 election. This may differ from other published sources showing gain/loss relative to seats held at dissolution of Scotland's councils.

== Ward results ==
=== Bo'ness and Blackness ===
- 2012: 2xSNP; 1xLab
- 2017: 1xSNP; 1xLab; 1xCon
- 2012-2017 Change: Conservative gain one seat from SNP

Bo'ness and Blackness – 3 seats
Party	Candidate	FPv%	Count			
Party	Candidate	FPv%	1	2	3	4
SNP	Ann Ritchie (incumbent)	27.97	1,510			
Conservative	Lynn Munro	26.15	1,412			
Labour	David Aitchison	20.49	1,106	1,116.38	1,130.17	1,381.23
SNP	Alan Gilbert	14.1	761	880.73	882.71	892.69
Green	Mari-Ellena Corvi	5.78	312	324.72	333.19	360.08
Labour	Michael Burnett	5.52	298	302.24	312.82	
Electorate: TBC Valid: 5,399 Spoilt: 137 Quota: 1350 Turnout: 5,536 (46.8%)

=== Grangemouth ===
- 2012: 2xLab; 1xSNP; 1xIndependent
- 2017: 1xLab; 1xSNP; 1xIndependent
- 2012-2017 Change: 1 less seat compared to 2012. Labour lose seat.

Grangemouth – 3 seats
Party	Candidate	FPv%	Count					
Party	Candidate	FPv%	1	2	3	4	5	6
SNP	David Balfour (incumbent)	26.95	1,510					
Labour	Allyson Black (incumbent)	23.22	1,301	1,309.44	1,332.73	1,483.53		
Conservative	James Bundy	18.38	1,030	1,031.79	1,040	1,074.58	1,094.4	
Independent	Robert Spears (incumbent)	17.49	980	988.08	1,004.58	1,247.12	1,274.46	1,834.19
SNP	Margaret-Ann Milne	12.06	676	756.82	799.39			
Green	Judith McLaughlin	1.91	107	109.72				
Electorate: TBC Valid: 5,604 Spoilt: 99 Quota: 1,402 Turnout: 5,703 (44.3%)

=== Denny and Banknock ===
- 2012: 2xSNP; 1xLab; 1xIndependent
- 2017: 2xSNP; 1xLab; 1xCon
- 2012-2017 Change: Conservative gain 1 seat from Independent

Denny and Banknock – 4 seats
Party	Candidate	FPv%	Count									
Party	Candidate	FPv%	1	2	3	4	5	6	7	8	9	10
SNP	Paul Garner (incumbent)	26.3	1,664									
Labour	Jim Blackwood (incumbent)	15.27	965	976.27	976.51	996.75	1,019.23	1,020.57	1,233.78	1,359.61		
Conservative	Nigel Harris	14.49	916	918.16	918.16	924.16	950.16	950.39	964.43	1,068.91	1,086.46	1,314.59
SNP	Fiona Collie	13.98	884	1,200.27	1,210.99	1,255.15	1,274.11					
Independent	Brian McCabe (incumbent)	10.87	687	719.13	722.85	737.57	780.57	782.45	811.89	984.92	1,002.97	
Independent	Alexander John Waddell	8.26	522	528.47	529.47	537.7	615.95	616.69	640.97			
Labour	Khalid Hamid	4.97	314	322.87	323.11	333.35	355.83	356.51				
Independent	Anne Montgomery	3.65	231	232.92	235.16	247.4						
Green	Cheryl Brind	1.89	119	122.84	125.08							
Solidarity	Sean Mellon	0.3	19	21.64								
Electorate: TBC Valid: 6,321 Spoilt: 95 Quota: 1,265 Turnout: 6,416 (44.1%)

=== Carse, Kinnaird & Tryst ===
- 2012: 2xLab; 2xSNP
- 2017: 2xSNP; 1xLab; 1xCon
- 2012-2017 Change: Conservative gain 1 seat from Labour

Carse, Kinnaird & Tryst – 4 seats
Party	Candidate	FPv%	Count						
Party	Candidate	FPv%	1	2	3	4	5	6	7
Conservative	Jim Flynn	27.85	1,968						
SNP	Gary Bouse	27.18	1,921						
Labour	Joan Coombes *	13.53	956	1,069.44	1,098.21	1,154.31	1,229.31	1,251.22	2,106.01
SNP	Laura Murtagh	13.3	940	955.48	1,350.04	1,374.34	1,530.07		
Labour	Martin Murray	12.03	850	964.01	980.63	997.67	1,050.7	1,070.97	
Green	Chris Marsh	4.12	291	328.16	358.51	408.87			
Independent	Safia Ali	1.99	141	198.71	206.1				
Electorate: TBC Valid: 7,067 Spoilt: 133 Quota: 1,414 Turnout: 7,200 (44%)

- = Outgoing Councillor for Grangemouth ward.

=== Bonnybridge and Larbert ===
- 2012: 1xSNP; 1xLab; 1xIndependent
- 2017: 1xSNP; 1xCon; 1xIndependent
- 2012-2017 Change: Conservative gain 1 seat from Labour

Bonnybridge and Larbert – 3 seats
Party	Candidate	FPv%	Count					
Party	Candidate	FPv%	1	2	3	4	5	6
SNP	Tom Coleman (incumbent)†	33.7	1,898					
Conservative	David Grant	24.31	1,368	1,389.43	1,404.2	1,427.07		
Independent	Billy Buchanan (incumbent)	20.15	1,134	1,225.91	1,271.58	1,394.9	1,400.54	1,902.47
Labour	Linda Gow (incumbent)	15.71	884	963.51	992.13	1,110.3	1,115.96	
Green	David Robertson	3.84	216	384.58	417.2			
Independent	Janine Rennie	2.27	128	153.3				
Electorate: TBC Valid: 5,628 Spoilt: 51 Quota: 1,408 Turnout: 5,679 (45.1%)

=== Falkirk North ===
- 2012: 2xSNP; 2xLab
- 2017: 2xSNP; 2xLab
- 2012-2017 Change: No change

Falkirk North – 4 seats
Party	Candidate	FPv%	Count					
Party	Candidate	FPv%	1	2	3	4	5	6
SNP	David Alexander (incumbent)	35.82	2,326					
Labour	Denis Goldie *	17.22	1,118	1,160.83	1,208.1	1,313.84		
SNP	Cecil Meiklejohn (incumbent)	16.33	1,060	1,864.91				
Conservative	Wendy Chandrachud	14.11	916	933.22	948.14	978.61	979.61	
Labour	Robert Bissett	12.95	841	908.11	962.4	1,102.62	1,113.75	1,563.47
Green	Debra Pickering	3.56	231	263.23	519.28			
Electorate: TBC Valid: 6,492 Spoilt: 196 Quota: 1,299 Turnout: 6,688 (41%)

- = Outgoing Councillor for Falkirk South.

=== Falkirk South ===
- 2012: 2xLab; 1xSNP; 1xCon
- 2017: 1xLab; 1xSNP; 1xCon
- 2012-2017 Change: 1 less seat compared to 2012. Labour lose seat.

Falkirk South – 3 seats
Party	Candidate	FPv%	Count
Party	Candidate	FPv%	1
SNP	Lorna Binnie	35.68	2,216
Conservative	John Patrick (incumbent)	32.09	1,993
Labour	Pat Reid *†††	27.15	1,686
Green	Donnie Buchanan	5.07	315
Electorate: TBC Valid: 6,210 Spoilt: 71 Quota: 1,553 Turnout: 6,281 (48.3%)

- = Sitting Councillor from Falkirk North.

=== Lower Braes ===
- 2012: 1xCon; 1xSNP; 1xLab
- 2017: 1xCon; 1xSNP; 1xLab
- 2012-2017 Change: No change

Lower Braes – 3 seats
Party	Candidate	FPv%	Count							
Party	Candidate	FPv%	1	2	3	4	5	6	7	8
Conservative	Malcolm Nicol (incumbent)	34.49	1,864							
SNP	Adanna McCue	30.19	1,632							
Labour	Alan Nimmo (incumbent)	14.06	760	894.04	944.99	961.84	970.94	1,066.33	1,146.65	1,446.12
Independent	Ricky Wilson	10.34	559	633.98	669.5	684.89	725.99	779.78	993.11	
Independent	Steven Jackson (incumbent)	5.27	285	339.93	359.32	369.06	421.23	472.93		
Green	Chris Brind	3.02	163	181.68	282.9	293.23	303.1			
Independent	Sam Hemple	1.81	98	121.07	128.28	137.12				
UKIP	Stuart Martin	0.81	44	89.04	91.96					
Electorate: TBC Valid: 5,405 Spoilt: 50 Quota: 1,352 Turnout: 5,455 (46.2%)

=== Upper Braes ===
- 2012: 2xLab; 1xSNP
- 2017: 1xCon; 1xSNP; 1xLab
- 2012-2017 Change: Conservative gain 1 seat from Labour

Upper Braes – 3 seats
Party	Candidate	FPv%	Count						
Party	Candidate	FPv%	1	2	3	4	5	6	7
Conservative	James Kerr††	30.22	1,701						
Labour	John McLuckie (incumbent)††	23.85	1,342	1,441.91					
SNP	Gordon Hughes (incumbent)	18.27	1,028	1,036.61	1,040.73	1,066.78	1,093.98	1,218.31	2,112.31
SNP	Farah Farzana	14.84	835	837.07	838.76	890.08	910.68	978.8	
Independent	Jim Robertson	6.4	360	401.68	409.18	449.03	602.12		
Independent	Neil Durning	3.25	183	224.17	228.32	262			
Green	Tom McLaughlin	3.18	179	193.12	196.92				
Electorate: TBC Valid: 5,628 Spoilt: 104 Quota: 1,408 Turnout: 5,732 (46.5%)

== Changes since 2017 ==
- † On 30 November 2017 Bonnybridge and Larbert SNP Cllr Tom Coleman died following a short illness. A by-election was held on 15 February 2018 and the seat was retained by his son, Niall.
- †† On 21 September 2018 Upper Braes Labour Cllr John McLuckie and Conservative Cllr James Kerr were suspended by both of their respective parties and became Independents having been charged by the police following an investigation into planning irregularities in Falkirk although both being cleared at a later date.
- †††On 29 July 2021 Falkirk South Labour Cllr Pat Reid announced he was resigning his seat. A by-election was held on 14 October and was gained by Emma Russell of the SNP.

== By-elections since 2017 ==
Bonnybridge and Larbert By-election (15 February 2018)
Party	Candidate	FPv%	Count				
Party	Candidate	FPv%	1	2	3	4	5
SNP	Niall Coleman	38.6	1,295	1,300	1,354	1,619	1,866
Conservative	George Stevenson	32.4	1,088	1,096	1,115	1,280	
Labour	Linda Gow	24.2	813	821	858		
Green	David Robertson	3.7	124	129			
UKIP	Stuart Martin	1.0	35				
Electorate: TBC Valid: 3,355 Spoilt: 30 Quota: 1,678 Turnout: 3,385 (26.5%)

Falkirk South By-election (14 October 2021)
Party	Candidate	FPv%	Count			
Party	Candidate	FPv%	1	2	3	4
SNP	Emma Russell	39.2	1,691	1,844	2,019	2,472
Conservative	Sarah Patrick	38.9	1,678	1,694	1,903	
Labour	James Marshall	15.7	678	733		
Green	Stuart Duffin	6.2	267			
Electorate: TBC Valid: 4,313 Spoilt: 44 Quota: 2,157 Turnout: 4,364 (32.5%)
