= 2007 Falkirk Council election =

Council election

- 3 May 2007

All 32 seats to Falkirk Council 17 seats needed for a majority

Elections to Falkirk Council were held on 3 May 2007—the same day as the Scottish Parliament general election. The election was the first one using 9 new wards created as a result of the Local Governance (Scotland) Act 2004. Each ward will elect three or four councillors using the single transferable vote system form of proportional representation. The new wards replace 32 single-member wards which used the plurality (first past the post) system of election.

== Results ==
Falkirk local election result 2007
Party	Seats	Gains	Losses	Net gain/loss	Seats %	Votes %	Votes	+/−
Labour	14	N/A	N/A	±0	43.8	36.2	21,732	
SNP	13	N/A	N/A	+4	40.6	35.1	21,067	
Conservative	2	N/A	N/A	±0	6.3	13.5	8,084	
Scottish Socialist	0	N/A	N/A	±0	0.0	1.7	1,028	
Green	0	N/A	N/A	±0	0.0	0.9	535	
Liberal Democrats	0	N/A	N/A	±0	0.0	0.8	451	
Independent	3	N/A	N/A	-4	9.4	11.9	7,119	

== Ward results ==
Bo'ness and Blackness
Party	Candidate	FPv%	%	Seat	Count
SNP	Harry Constable	1,723	27.6	1	1
Labour	Adrian Mahoney	1,460	23.4	2	4
SNP	John Constable	1,221	19.6	3	6
Conservative	Lynn Edith Munro	793	12.7		
Labour	Ken Wright	532	8.5		
Independent	Rob Willox	268	4.3		
Scottish Socialist	Garry Chapman	239	3.8		

Grangemouth
Party	Candidate	FPv%	%	Seat	Count
SNP	Angus MacDonald	1,954	27.9	1	1
Labour	Allyson Black	1,497	21.4	2	1
Independent	Robert Spears	1,412	20.2	3	1
Labour	Alistair McNeill	1,087	15.5	4	7
Conservative	Stuart Martin	711	10.2		
SNP	Angus Rae	238	3.4		
Scottish Socialist	Carol Hainey	96	1.4		

Denny and Banknock
Party	Candidate	FPv%	%	Seat	Count
SNP	John McNally	2,093	29.1	1	1
Labour	Jim Blackwood	1,707	23.7	2	1
Independent	Alexander John Waddell	991	13.8	3	8
SNP	Martin David Oliver	789	11.0	4	8
Labour	Khalid Hamid	775	10.8		
Conservative	Alistair Hislop	384	5.3		
Independent	Fiona Buchanan	238	3.3		
Scottish Socialist	Danny Quinlan	134	1.9		
Independent	Wesley Edmund	83	1.2		

Carse, Kinnaird and Tryst
Party	Candidate	FPv%	%	Seat	Count
Labour	Charles MacDonald	1,754	25.0	1	1
Labour	Craig Martin	1,546	22.1	2	1
SNP	Steven Carleschi	1,430	20.4	3	1
SNP	Lynda Kenna	1,080	15.4	4	7
Conservative	Jim Flynn	726	10.4		
Independent	Brian Goldie	374	5.3		
Scottish Socialist	Mick McInosh	92	1.3		

Bonnybridge and Larbert
Party	Candidate	FPv%	%	Seat	Count
SNP	Tom Coleman	1,916	31.2	1	1
Independent	Billy Buchanan	1,566	25.5	2	1
Labour	Linda Gow	1,557	25.4	3	1
Conservative	Juliet Martin	576	9.4		
Green	David George Robertson	302	4.9		
Independent	Denis Shovlin	143	2.3		
Scottish Socialist	David Fowler	72	1.2		

Falkirk North
Party	Candidate	FPv%	%	Seat	Count
SNP	David Alexander	2,500	34.7	1	1
Labour	Craig Martin	1,480	20.5	2	2
Labour	Pat Reid	1,293	17.9	3	5
SNP	Cecil Meiklejohn	689	9.6	4	7
Conservative	Alison Harris	562	7.8		
Liberal Democrats	Gavin Chomczuk	451	6.3		
Independent	Margaret D. Laurie	136	1.9		
Scottish Socialist	Gordon Clubb	94	1.3		

Falkirk South
Party	Candidate	FPv%	%	Seat	Count
Labour	Gerry Goldie	2,528	33.4	1	1
SNP	Georgie Thomson	2,192	28.9	2	1
Conservative	John Patrick	1,482	19.6	4	2
Labour	Joe Lemetti	853	11.3	3	2
Independent	Ronald Buchanan	390	5.2		
Scottish Socialist	Mark Straub	127	1.7		

Lower Braes
Party	Candidate	FPv%	%	Seat	Count
Conservative	Malcolm Nicol	2,046	35.9	1	1
SNP	Steven Jackson	1,281	22.5	2	3
Labour	Alan Nimmo	1,108	19.4	3	6
Independent	Ricky Wilson	963	16.9		
Green	Norman Philip	233	4.1		
Scottish Socialist	William McSporran	74	1.3		

Upper Braes
Party	Candidate	FPv%	%	Seat	Count
SNP	Gordon Hughes	1,961	32.8	1	1
Labour	Stephen Fry	1,388	23.2	2	3
Labour	John McLuckie	1,167	19.5	3	6
Conservative	Drew Lapsley	804	13.5		
Independent	Neil Durning	555	9.3		
Scottish Socialist	Mary Straub	100	1.7		

== 2007-2012 by-elections ==
- Following the death of SNP Cllr Harry Constable, a by-election arose and the seat was retained by the party's Ann Ritchie on 1 November 2009.

Bo'ness and Blackness By-Election (1 November 2009) - 1 seat
Party	Candidate	FPv%	Count
Party	Candidate	FPv%	1
SNP	Ann Ritchie	57.52	1,604
Labour	Ainslie Lennox	29.51	823
Conservative	Lynn Munro	10.15	283
Liberal Democrats	Gavin Chomczuk	2.83	79
SNP hold		Swing	
Electorate: 11,999 Valid: 2,789 Spoilt: 26 Quota: 1,408 Turnout: 2,815 (23.5%)

- Following the death of SNP Cllr John Constable, a by-election arose and the seat was retained by the party's Sandy Turner on 10 June 2011.

Bo'ness and Blackness By-Election (10 June 2011) - 1 seat
Party	Candidate	FPv%	Count
Party	Candidate	FPv%	1
SNP	Sandy Turner	57.81	1,621
Labour	David Aitchison	31.85	893
Conservative	Lynn Munro	8.23	231
Independent	Gerry Lawton	2.1	59
SNP hold		Swing	
Electorate: 11,835 Valid: 2,804 Spoilt: 19 Quota: 1,403 Turnout: 2,823 (23.7%)
