= 2012 Falkirk Council election =

2012 Scottish local government election

- 3 May 2012

All 32 seats to Falkirk Council 17 seats needed for a majority

	First party	Second party
Leader	Craig Martin	David Alexander
Party	Labour	SNP
Leader's seat	Carse, Kinnaird & Tryst	Falkirk North
Last election	14 seats, 43.8%	13 seats, 40.6%
Seats before	14	13
Seats won	14	13
Seat change	Steady	Steady
	Third party	Fourth party
Leader	Billy Buchanan	John Patrick
Party	Independent	Conservative
Leader's seat	Bonnybridge and Larbert	Falkirk South
Last election	3 seats, 9.4%	2 seats, 6.3%
Seats before	1	2
Seats won	3	2
Seat change	Steady	Steady
Swing		Independent Group Leader – Robert Spears Seat – Grangemouth Seats – 2
Council Leader before election
Craig Martin
Labour
Council Leader after election
Craig Martin
Labour

Elections to Falkirk Council were held on 3 May 2012, the same day as the 31 other local authorities in Scotland. The election used the nine wards created under the Local Governance (Scotland) Act 2004, with 32 councillors being elected. Each ward elected either 3 or 4 members, using the STV electoral system.

The election saw Labour remain the largest party on the council despite receiving fewer votes than the Scottish National Party. The Scottish Conservative and Unionist Party saw its vote share fall but retained its council seats, while independent candidates won three seats, as they had in the 2007 local elections.

Following the election, the controlling administration consisted of 14 Labour members, two Conservative members and one Independent member (Councillor Buchanan). The opposition consisted of 13 SNP members and two Independent members (Councillors Spears and McCabe). The Council Leader is Cllr Craig C Martin, Provost is Cllr Reid and the Depute Provost Cllr Patrick.

== Election result ==
Falkirk local election result 2012
Party	Seats	Gains	Losses	Net gain/loss	Seats %	Votes %	Votes	+/−
Labour	14	-	-	-	43.75	37.74	16,150	+1.54
SNP	13	-	-	-	40.63	40.48	17,321	+5.38
Independent	3	-	-	-	9.4	10.54	4,512	-1.36
Conservative	2	-	-	-	6.3	11.23	4,806	-2.27

Note: "Votes" are the first preference votes. The net gain/loss and percentage changes relate to the result of the previous Scottish local elections on 3 May 2007. This may differ from other published sources showing gain/loss relative to seats held at dissolution of Scotland's councils.

== Ward results ==
=== Bo'ness and Blackness ===
- 2007: 2xSNP; 1xLab
- 2012: 2xSNP; 1xLab
- 2007-2012 Change: No change

Bo'ness and Blackness – 3 seats
Party	Candidate	FPv%	Count			
Party	Candidate	FPv%	1	2	3	4
SNP	Ann Ritchie (incumbent)	37.67	1,526			
Labour	Adrian Mahoney (incumbent)	21.03	852	900.1	1,010.8	1,780.8
Labour	David Aitchison	20.39	826	850.9	910.2	
SNP	Sandy Turner (incumbent)	11.40	462	848.3	915.9	956.1
Conservative	Lynn Munro	9.50	385	401.5		
Electorate: 11,250 Valid: 4,051 Spoilt: 79 Quota: 1,013 Turnout: 4,130 (36.01%)

=== Grangemouth ===
- 2007: 2xLab; 1xSNP; 1xIndependent
- 2012: 2xLab; 1xSNP; 1xIndependent
- 2007-2012 Change: No change

Grangemouth – 4 seats
Party	Candidate	FPv%	Count							
Party	Candidate	FPv%	1	2	3	4	5	6	7	8
Labour	Allyson Black (incumbent)	24.68	1,201							
SNP	David Balfour	22.58	1,099							
Independent	Robert Spears (incumbent)	17.71	862	877.9	882.4	963.6	1,064.6			
Labour	Joan Paterson	10.33	503	675.4	678.6	695.6	725.8	739.3	815.4	978.4
SNP	Andrew Cowie	8.69	423	432.3	538.8	562.2	596.2	608.9	683.7	
Conservative	Amanda Nicol	5.73	279	285	286.3	309.8				
Independent	Jim Waugh	5.59	272	275.4	277.4	331.6	377.9	412.7		
Independent	David Sharp	4.68	228	231.6	233.4					
Electorate: 12,350 Valid: 4,867 Spoilt: 124 Quota: 974 Turnout: 4,991 (39.41%)

=== Denny and Banknock ===
- 2007: 2xSNP; 1xLab; 1xIndependent
- 2012: 2xSNP; 1xLab; 1xIndependent
- 2007-2012 Change: No change

Denny and Banknock – 4 seats
Party	Candidate	FPv%	Count						
Party	Candidate	FPv%	1	2	3	4	5	6	7
SNP	John McNally (incumbent)†	28.23	1,502						
Labour	Jim Blackwood (incumbent)	22.35	1,189						
Independent	Brian McCabe	11.69	622	676.9	680.9	714.1	801.2	977.6	1,133.3
SNP	Martin D. Oliver (incumbent)	10.73	571	870.1	879.4	900.1	972.5	1,062.6	1,148
Labour	Terrie Hay	8.33	443	459	539.7	563.2	614.7	684.9	
Independent	Alexander John Waddell (incumbent)	7.72	411	433.1	439.6	480.2	539.5		
Independent	Khalid Hamid	7.27	387	398.9	406.4	428.2			
Conservative	David Grant	3.70	197	200.7	204.5				
Electorate: 12,350 Valid: 5,321 Spoilt: 95 Quota: 1,065 Turnout: 5,416 (39.45%)

=== Carse, Kinnaird & Tryst ===
- 2007: 2xLab; 2xSNP
- 2012: 2xLab; 2xSNP
- 2007-2012 Change: No change

Carse, Kinnaird & Tryst – 4 seats
Party	Candidate	FPv%	Count		
Party	Candidate	FPv%	1	2	3
Labour	Charles MacDonald (incumbent)	26.28	1,377		
Labour	Craig Martin (incumbent)	25.42	1,332		
SNP	Stephen Bird	23.61	1,237		
SNP	Steven Carleschi (incumbent)	17.33	908	986.1	1,052.9
Conservative	Jim Flynn	7.35	385	437.3	480.8
Electorate: 14,121 Valid: 5,239 Spoilt: 86 Quota: 1,048 Turnout: 5,325 (37.1%)

=== Bonnybridge and Larbert ===
- 2007: 1xSNP; 1xIndependent; 1xLab
- 2012: 1xSNP; 1xLab; 1xIndependent
- 2007-2012 Change: No change

Bonnybridge and Larbert – 3 seats
Party	Candidate	FPv%	Count			
Party	Candidate	FPv%	1	2	3	4
SNP	Tom Coleman (incumbent)	30.95	1,387			
Labour	Linda Gow (incumbent)	27.56	1,235			
Independent	Billy Buchanan (incumbent)	22.72	1,018	1,042.7	1,073.3	1,138.4
Conservative	Elliot Roy	8.39	379	385	394.2	430.1
SNP	Lynda Kenna *	6.67	299	493.8	512.9	560.8
Independent	Chris Harley	3.70	166	176.7	192.6	
Electorate: 11,746 Valid: 4,481 Spoilt: 71 Quota: 1,121 Turnout: 4,552 (38.15%)

- Sitting Councillor from a different ward.

=== Falkirk North ===
- 2007: 2xLab; 2xSNP
- 2012: 2xSNP; 2xLab
- 2007-2012 Change: No change

Falkirk North – 4 seats
Party	Candidate	FPv%	Count	
Party	Candidate	FPv%	1	2
SNP	David Alexander (incumbent)	36.46	1,915	
Labour	Craig Martin (incumbent)	20.98	1,102	
Labour	Pat Reid (incumbent)	19.25	1,011	1,070.6
SNP	Cecil Meiklejohn (incumbent)	16.73	879	1,604.5
Conservative	Robert Edward Ardis	6.59	346	361.8
Electorate: 13,878 Valid: 5,253 Spoilt: 129 Quota: 1,051 Turnout: 5,382 (37.85%)

=== Falkirk South ===
- 2007: 2xLab; 1xSNP; 1xCon
- 2012: 2xLab; 1xSNP; 1xCon
- 2007-2012 Change: No change

Falkirk South – 4 seats
Party	Candidate	FPv%	Count						
Party	Candidate	FPv%	1	2	3	4	5	6	7
Labour	Dennis Goldie	23.96	1,279						
SNP	Colin Chalmers	21.74	1,160						
Conservative	John Patrick (incumbent)	15.76	841	844.6	846.9	856.9	984.9	998.4	1,212.7
Labour	Gerry Goldie (incumbent)	15.72	839	1,025.6	1,031.5	1,039.5	1,184.9		
SNP	Georgie Thomson (incumbent)	12.59	672	675.3	748.1	754.7	854.3	874.9	
Independent	Joe Lemetti (incumbent)	8.71	465	472.3	477.6	519.9			
Independent	Hugh McGinlay	1.52	81	81.3	82.4				
Electorate: 13,207 Valid: 5,337 Spoilt: 100 Quota: 1,068 Turnout: 5,437 (40.41%)

=== Lower Braes ===
- 2007: 1xCon; 1xSNP; 1xLab
- 2012: 1xCon; 1xSNP; 1xLab
- 2007-2012 Change: No change

Lower Braes – 3 seats
Party	Candidate	FPv%	Count
Party	Candidate	FPv%	1
Conservative	Malcolm Nicol (incumbent)	35.99	1,447
SNP	Steven Jackson (incumbent)	31.32	1,259
Labour	Alan Nimmo (incumbent)	27.78	1,117
SNP	Robbie Landsman	4.90	197
Electorate: 9,948 Valid: 4,020 Spoilt: 100 Quota: 1,068 Turnout: 4,120 (40.41%)

=== Upper Braes ===
- 2007: 2xLab; 1xSNP
- 2012: 2xLab; 1xSNP
- 2007-2012 Change: No change

Upper Braes – 3 seats
Party	Candidate	FPv%	Count				
Party	Candidate	FPv%	1	2	3	4	5
Labour	John McLuckie (incumbent)	32.26	1,361				
SNP	Gordon Hughes (incumbent)	29.79	1,257				
SNP	Ricky Wilson	13.46	568	592.5	757.9	862.9	
Conservative	Alan Rust	13.04	550	565.5	573.5		
Labour	Rosie Murray	11.45	483	712.3	725.3	905.9	1,176.5
Electorate: 11,033 Valid: 4,219 Spoilt: 101 Quota: 1,055 Turnout: 4,320 (38.24%)

== Post-Election Changes ==
- † Denny and Banknock SNP Cllr John McNally was elected as an MP for Falkirk on 7 May 2015. He resigned his Council seat in June and a by-election was held on 13 August 2015 which was held by the SNP's Paul Garner.

== By-elections since 2012 ==
Denny and Banknock By-election (13 August 2015) – 1 Seat
Party	Candidate	FPv%	Count
Party	Candidate	FPv%	1
SNP	Paul Garner	69.1%	2,576
Labour	Andrew Bell	14.7%	549
Conservative	David Grant	11.6%	431
Green	Brian Capaloff	4.6%	170
Electorate: 14,462 Valid: 3,726 Spoilt: 34 Quota: 1,864 Turnout: 3,760 (26.1%)
