= 2000 Falkirk West by-election =

2000 UK Parliamentary by-election

- 21 December 2000
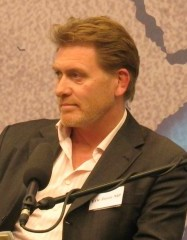
	First party	Second party
Candidate	Eric Joyce	David Kerr
Party	Labour	SNP
Popular vote	8,492	7,787
Percentage	43.5%	39.9%
Swing	▼15.9%	▲16.5%
	Third party	Fourth party
Candidate	Craig Stevenson	Iain Hunter
Party	Conservative	Scottish Socialist
Popular vote	1,621	989
Percentage	8.3%	5.1%
Swing	▼3.8%	New
MP before election
Dennis Canavan
Labour
Elected MP
Eric Joyce
Labour

A by-election for the United Kingdom parliamentary constituency of Falkirk West was held on 21 December 2000, caused by the resignation of incumbent Labour Party Member of Parliament (MP) Dennis Canavan. It was won by Eric Joyce who held the seat for Labour, narrowly holding off a strong challenge from the Scottish National Party (SNP).

It was the last of seventeen by-elections held in the 1997–2001 parliament.

== Background ==
The vacancy was caused by the resignation from the UK House of Commons of Dennis Canavan, the MP for Falkirk West. Canavan had first been elected for West Stirlingshire in the October 1974 election as a Labour Party candidate, and had held that seat until its abolition in 1983. He had then won the new Falkirk West seat, and held that seat as a Labour MP until he was expelled from Labour in 1999. He then sat as an Independent until he resigned on 21 November 2000 by accepting the office of Crown Steward and Bailiff of the Manor of Northstead.

== Result ==
Falkirk West by-election, 2000
Party	Candidate	Votes	%	±%
Labour	Eric Joyce	8,492	43.5	−15.9
SNP	David Kerr	7,787	39.9	+16.5
Conservative	Craig Stevenson	1,621	8.3	−3.8
Scottish Socialist	Iain Hunter	989	5.1	New
Liberal Democrats	Hugh O'Donnell	615	3.2	−1.9
Majority		705	3.6	−32.3
Turnout		19,504	36.1	−36.5
Labour hold		Swing	-16.2	

== General Election result, 1997 ==
General Election 1997: Falkirk West
Party	Candidate	Votes	%	±%
Labour	Dennis Canavan	22,772	59.3	+9.6
SNP	David Alexander	8,989	23.4	−0.9
Conservative	Carol Buchanan	4,639	12.1	−7.6
Liberal Democrats	Derek Houston	1,970	5.1	−1.1
Majority		13,783	35.9	+10.4
Turnout		38,370	72.6	
Labour hold		Swing		

== See also ==
- Elections in Scotland
