= List of elections of Scottish representative peers =

After the Acts of Union 1707, the peerage of Scotland elected sixteen of their number, the Scottish representative peers, to sit in the House of Lords at Westminster. General elections were held with each Parliament, and by-elections to fill vacancies in between. The elections ceased after the Peerage Act 1963 granted all peers of Scotland a hereditary seat in the House of Lords.

The first election of Scottish representative peers took place on 15 February 1707 at the Parliament House, Edinburgh, shortly before the Parliament of Scotland was adjourned for the last time on 25 March. The commissioners for the barons and the burghs chose their representatives to the British House of Commons at the same time.

The elections were not without controversy: in November 1708, four Scottish peers - William Johnstone, 1st Marquess of Annandale, John Earl of Sutherland, Patrick Earl of Marchmont, and William Lord Rosse - presented a petition in the House of Lords complaining of irregularities in the voting which they claimed had led to them being unfairly outvoted by William Kerr, 3rd Marquess of Lothian, and the Earls of Wemyss, Loudoun, and Glasgow. After taking evidence and legal advice, and ordering a recount of votes, the House of Lords resolved on 3 February 1709, to remove the Marquess of Lothian, and replace him with the Marquess of Annandale.

== List of elections since the Union ==
| Date | General or by-election | Place | Returning officers | Number of peers present |
|---|---|---|---|---|
| 17 June 1708 | G | Palace of Holyroodhouse | Two Clerks of Session | 57 |
| 10 November 1710 | G | Palace of Holyroodhouse | Two Clerks of Session | 49 |
| 14 August 1712 | B | Palace of Holyroodhouse | Two Clerks of Session | 32 |
| 13 January 1713 | B | Palace of Holyroodhouse | Two Clerks of Session | 25 |
| 8 October 1713 | G | Palace of Holyroodhouse | Two Clerks of Session | 36 |
| 3 March 1715 | G | Palace of Holyroodhouse | Two Clerks of Session | 43 |
| 28 February 1716 | B | Palace of Holyroodhouse | Two Clerks of Session | 18 |
| 1 June 1721 | B | Palace of Holyroodhouse | Two Clerks of Session | 22 |
| 21 April 1722 | G | Palace of Holyroodhouse | Two Clerks of Session | 42 |
| 15 August 1722 | B | Palace of Holyroodhouse | Two Clerks of Session | 18 |
| 13 June 1723 | B | Palace of Holyroodhouse | Two Clerks of Session | 13 |
| 20 September 1727 | G | Palace of Holyroodhouse | Two Clerks of Session | 33 |
| 17 November 1730 | B | Palace of Holyroodhouse | Two Clerks of Session | 23 |
| 19 February 1731 | B | Palace of Holyroodhouse | Two Clerks of Session | 17 |
| 28 January 1732 | B | Palace of Holyroodhouse | Two Clerks of Session | 17 |
| 21 September 1733 | B | Palace of Holyroodhouse | Two Clerks of Session | 37 |
| 4 June 1734 | G | Burgh Room | Two Clerks of Session | 60 |
| 22 October 1736 | B | Burgh Room | Two Clerks of Session | 33 |
| 14 April 1737 | B | Burgh Room | Two Clerks of Session | 21 |
| 14 March 1738 | B | Burgh Room | Two Clerks of Session | 21 |
| 22 March 1739 | B | Burgh Room | Two Clerks of Session | 20 |
| 13 June 1741 | G | Court of Exchequer | Two Clerks of Session | 37 |
| 30 April 1742 | B | Palace of Holyroodhouse | Two Clerks of Session | 24 |
| 12 October 1744 | B | Palace of Holyroodhouse | Two Clerks of Session | 17 |
| 1 August 1747 | G | Palace of Holyroodhouse | Two Clerks of Session | 33 |
| 15 March 1750 | B | Palace of Holyroodhouse | Two Clerks of Session | 25 |
| 9 July 1752 | B | Palace of Holyroodhouse | Two Clerks of Session | 26 |
| 16 November 1752 | B | Palace of Holyroodhouse | Two Clerks of Session | 23 |
| 21 May 1754 | G | Palace of Holyroodhouse | Two Clerks of Session | 36 |
| 5 May 1761 | G | Palace of Holyroodhouse | Two Clerks of Session | 39 |
| 12 August 1761 | B | Palace of Holyroodhouse | Two Clerks of Session | 22 |
| 8 March 1763 | B | Palace of Holyroodhouse | Two Clerks of Session | 20 |
| 21 August 1766 | B | Palace of Holyroodhouse | Two Clerks of Session | 23 |
| 1 October 1767 | B | Palace of Holyroodhouse | Two Clerks of Session | 28 |
| 26 April 1768 | G | Palace of Holyroodhouse | Two Clerks of Session | 37 |
| 21 December 1768 | B | Palace of Holyroodhouse | Two Clerks of Session | 17 |
| 17 January 1770 | B | Palace of Holyroodhouse | Two Clerks of Session | 23 |
| 2 January 1771 | B | Palace of Holyroodhouse | Two Clerks of Session | 28 |
| 15 November 1774 | G | Palace of Holyroodhouse | Two Clerks of Session | 34 |
| 24 January 1776 | B | Palace of Holyroodhouse | Two Clerks of Session | 13 |
| 13 June 1776 | B | Palace of Holyroodhouse | Two Clerks of Session | 13 |
| 14 November 1776 | B | Palace of Holyroodhouse | Two Clerks of Session | 15 |
| 24 September 1778 | B | Palace of Holyroodhouse | Two Clerks of Session | 15 |
| 17 October 1780 | G | Palace of Holyroodhouse | Two Clerks of Session | 26 |
| 24 July 1782 | B | Palace of Holyroodhouse | Two Clerks of Session | 14 |
| 8 May 1784 | G | Palace of Holyroodhouse | Two Clerks of Session | 40 |
| 28 March 1787 | B | Palace of Holyroodhouse | Two Clerks of Session | 19 |
| 10 January 1788 | B | Palace of Holyroodhouse | Two Clerks of Session | 18 |
| 24 July 1790 | G | Palace of Holyroodhouse | Two Clerks of Session | 33 |
| 7 August 1793 | B | Palace of Holyroodhouse | Two Clerks of Session | 13 |
| 23 October 1794 | B | Palace of Holyroodhouse | Two Clerks of Session | 11 |
| 30 June 1796 | G | Palace of Holyroodhouse | Two Clerks of Session | 25 |
| 15 August 1798 | B | Palace of Holyroodhouse | Two Clerks of Session | 11 |
| 10 August 1802 | G | Palace of Holyroodhouse | Two Clerks of Session | 29 |
| 16 June 1803 | B | Palace of Holyroodhouse | Two Clerks of Session | 13 |
| 14 November 1804 | B | Palace of Holyroodhouse | Two Clerks of Session | 15 |
| 4 December 1806 | G | Palace of Holyroodhouse | Two Clerks of Session | 18 |
| 9 June 1807 | G | Palace of Holyroodhouse | Two Clerks of Session | 20 |
| 13 November 1812 | G | Palace of Holyroodhouse | Two Clerks of Session | 29 |
| 17 April 1817 | B | Palace of Holyroodhouse | Two Clerks of Session | 13 |
| 24 July 1818 | G | Palace of Holyroodhouse | Two Clerks of Session | 27 |
| 18 March 1819 | B | Palace of Holyroodhouse | Two Clerks of Session | 10 |
| 11 April 1820 | G | Palace of Holyroodhouse | Two Clerks of Session | 21 |
| 2 August 1821 | B | Palace of Holyroodhouse | Two Clerks of Session | 10 |
| 2 October 1823 | B | Palace of Holyroodhouse | Two Clerks of Session | 11 |
| 8 July 1824 | B | Palace of Holyroodhouse | Two Clerks of Session | 6 |
| 2 June 1825 | B | Palace of Holyroodhouse | Two Clerks of Session | 8 |
| 13 July 1826 | G | Palace of Holyroodhouse | Two Clerks of Session | 25 |
| 10 April 1828 | B | Palace of Holyroodhouse | Two Clerks of Session | 10 |
| 2 September 1830 | G | Palace of Holyroodhouse | Two Clerks of Session | 21 |
| 3 June 1831 | G | Palace of Holyroodhouse | Two Clerks of Session | 30 |
| 14 January 1833 | G | Palace of Holyroodhouse | Two Clerks of Session | 31 |
| 10 February 1835 | G | Palace of Holyroodhouse | Two Clerks of Session | 24 |
| 25 August 1837 | G | Palace of Holyroodhouse | Two Clerks of Session | 18 |
| 5 August 1841 | G | Palace of Holyroodhouse | Two Clerks of Session | 21 |
| 19 January 1842 | B | Palace of Holyroodhouse | Two Clerks of Session | 8 |
| 19 July 1843 | B | Palace of Holyroodhouse | Two Clerks of Session | 8 |
| 17 March 1847 | B | Palace of Holyroodhouse | Two Clerks of Session | 9 |
| 8 September 1847 | G | Palace of Holyroodhouse | Two Clerks of Session | 16 |
| 13 March 1850 | B | Palace of Holyroodhouse | Two Clerks of Session | 11 |
| 6 August 1851 | B | Palace of Holyroodhouse | Two Clerks of Session | 11 |
| 15 July 1852 | G | Palace of Holyroodhouse | Four Clerks of Session | 19 |
| 7 September 1853 | B | Palace of Holyroodhouse | Four Clerks of Session | 16 |
| 16 November 1853 | B | Palace of Holyroodhouse | Four Clerks of Session | 10 |
| 14 April 1857 | G | Palace of Holyroodhouse | Four Clerks of Session | 18 |
| 29 June 1858 | B | Palace of Holyroodhouse | Two Clerks of Session | 11 |
| 10 May 1859 | G | Palace of Holyroodhouse | Two Clerks of Session | 19 |
| 15 November 1860 | B | Palace of Holyroodhouse | Two Clerks of Session | 15 |
| 28 July 1865 | G | Palace of Holyroodhouse | Lord Clerk Register (Sir William Gibson-Craig) | 24 |
| 21 March 1867 | B | Palace of Holyroodhouse | Lord Clerk Register (Sir William Gibson-Craig) | 9 |
| 27 November 1867 | B | Palace of Holyroodhouse | Lord Clerk Register (Sir William Gibson-Craig) | 7 |
| 3 December 1868 | G | Palace of Holyroodhouse | Lord Clerk Register (Sir William Gibson-Craig) | 18 |
| 7 July 1869 | B | Palace of Holyroodhouse | Lord Clerk Register (Sir William Gibson-Craig) | 2 |
| 4 August 1870 | B | Palace of Holyroodhouse | Lord Clerk Register (Sir William Gibson-Craig) | 7 |
| 7 March 1872 | B | Palace of Holyroodhouse | Lord Clerk Register (Sir William Gibson-Craig) | 8 |
| 18 February 1874 | G | Palace of Holyroodhouse | Lord Clerk Register (Sir William Gibson-Craig) | 20 |
| 22 December 1876 | B | Palace of Holyroodhouse | Lord Clerk Register (Sir William Gibson-Craig) | 18 |
| 11 March 1879 | B | Palace of Holyroodhouse | Lord Clerk Register (The Earl of Glasgow) | 24 |
| 16 April 1880 | G | Palace of Holyroodhouse | Lord Clerk Register (The Earl of Glasgow) | 26 |
| 11 January 1882 | B | Palace of Holyroodhouse | Lord Clerk Register (The Earl of Glasgow) | 15 |
| 17 February 1885 | B | Palace of Holyroodhouse | Lord Clerk Register (The Earl of Glasgow) | 17 |
| 10 June 1885 | B | Palace of Holyroodhouse | Lord Clerk Register (The Earl of Glasgow) | 4 |
| 10 December 1885 | G | Palace of Holyroodhouse | Lord Clerk Register (The Earl of Glasgow) | 26 |
| 4 February 1886 | B | Palace of Holyroodhouse | Lord Clerk Register (The Earl of Glasgow) | 7 |
| 25 March 1886 | B | Palace of Holyroodhouse | Lord Clerk Register (The Earl of Glasgow) | 8 |
| 20 July 1886 | G | Palace of Holyroodhouse | Lord Clerk Register (The Earl of Glasgow) | 15 |
| 10 January 1889 | B | Palace of Holyroodhouse | Deputy Clerk Register (Stair Agnew) | 7 |
| 6 January 1890 | B | Palace of Holyroodhouse | Lord Clerk Register | 15 |
| 10 December 1891 | B | Palace of Holyroodhouse | Lord Clerk Register (the Duke of Montrose) | 12 |
| 14 July 1892 | G | Palace of Holyroodhouse | Lord Clerk Register (the Duke of Montrose) | 16 |
| 18 July 1894 | B | Palace of Holyroodhouse | Lord Clerk Register (the Duke of Montrose) | 10 |
| 24 July 1895 | G | Palace of Holyroodhouse | Lord Clerk Register (the Duke of Montrose) | 12 |
| 5 October 1900 | G | Palace of Holyroodhouse | Deputy Clerk Register (Sir Stair Agnew) | 17 |
| 30 January 1906 | G | Palace of Holyroodhouse | Lord Clerk Register | 25 |
| 8 November 1906 | B | Palace of Holyroodhouse | Two Clerks of Session | 3 |
| 28 January 1910 | G | Palace of Holyroodhouse | Lord Clerk Register | 19 |
| 15 December 1910 | G | Palace of Holyroodhouse | Lord Clerk Register | 15 |
| 10 October 1917 | B | Palace of Holyroodhouse | Lord Clerk Register | 12 |
| 20 December 1918 | G | Palace of Holyroodhouse | Lord Clerk Register | 14 |
| 13 January 1922 | G | Palace of Holyroodhouse | Lord Clerk Register | 17 |
| 16 November 1922 | G | Palace of Holyroodhouse | Lord Clerk Register | 20 |
| 10 December 1923 | G | Palace of Holyroodhouse | Lord Clerk Register | 16 |
| 3 November 1924 | G | Palace of Holyroodhouse | Lord Clerk Register | 23 |
| 31 May 1929 | G | Palace of Holyroodhouse | Lord Clerk Register (the Duke of Buccleuch) | 27 |
| 29 October 1931 | G | Palace of Holyroodhouse | Lord Clerk Register (the Duke of Buccleuch) | 19 |
| 15 November 1935 | G | Palace of Holyroodhouse | Principal Clerk of Session | 25 |
| 8 January 1941 | B | Palace of Holyroodhouse | Lord Clerk Register (the Earl of Mar and Kellie) | 9 |
| 6 July 1945 | G | Palace of Holyroodhouse | Lord Clerk Register (the Lord Elphinstone) | 12 |
| 1 July 1947 | B | Palace of Holyroodhouse | Lord Clerk Register (the Lord Elphinstone) | 12 |
| 21 February 1950 | G | Palace of Holyroodhouse | Lord Clerk Register (the Lord Elphinstone) | 26 |
| 23 October 1951 | G | Palace of Holyroodhouse | Lord Clerk Register (the Lord Elphinstone) | 23 |
| 2 April 1952 | B | Palace of Holyroodhouse | Lord Clerk Register (the Lord Elphinstone) | 14 |
| 23 May 1955 | G | Parliament House | Lord Clerk Register (the Lord Elphinstone) | 32 |
| 1 September 1958 | B | Palace of Holyroodhouse | Lord Clerk Register (the Duke of Buccleuch) | 18 |
| 6 October 1959 | G | Palace of Holyroodhouse | Lord Clerk Register (the Duke of Buccleuch) | 25 |
