= Falkirk West =

Falkirk West may refer to:

- Falkirk West (UK Parliament constituency), a constituency that was represented in the House of Commons of the Parliament of the United Kingdom between 1983 and 2005
- Falkirk West (Scottish Parliament constituency), a constituency represented in the Scottish Parliament
