= Robert Ian Aonas MacInnes =

Robert Ian Aonas MacInnes QC (23 July 1902 – 14 January 1972), was Sheriff of Lanarkshire and a Scottish Liberal Party and Scottish Labour Party politician.

== Background ==
MacInnes was born the younger son of Rev. Dr Alexander MacInnes, Kirkliston, of Edinburgh. He was educated at the University of Edinburgh. In 1937 he married Mary Galloway Morrison and together they had one daughter.

== Professional career ==
MacInnes was called to Scottish Bar in 1924. He was Sheriff Substitute of Ross and Cromarty and Sutherland at Stornoway 1934–40, of Argyll at Dunoon 1940–41, of Bute at Rothesay 1940–41 and of Lanarkshire at Glasgow 1948–53. He was made a Queen's Counsel (Scotland) in 1946. He was Sheriff Substitute of Lanarkshire at Hamilton from 1953–55.

== Political career ==
MacInnes was Liberal candidate for the West Stirlingshire division at the 1923 General Election. He was Labour candidate for the Caithness and Sutherland division at the 1945 General Election. He did not stand for parliament again.

=== Electoral record ===
General Election 1923: Stirlingshire West
Party	Candidate	Votes	%	±%
Labour	Thomas Johnston	9,242	51.9	−0.5
Unionist	Harry Hope	6,182	34.7	−12.9
Liberal	Robert Ian Aonas MacInnes	2,390	13.4	n/a
Majority		3,060	17.2	+12.4
Turnout			74.7	+0.6
Labour hold		Swing	+6.2	

General Election 1945: Caithness and Sutherland
Party	Candidate	Votes	%	±%
Unionist	Eric Gandar Dower	5,564	33.5	n/a
Labour	Robert Ian Aonas MacInnes	5,558	33.4	n/a
Liberal	Archibald Henry Macdonald Sinclair	5,503	33.1	−39.2
Majority		6	0.0	
Turnout			64.2	+4.1
Unionist gain from Liberal		Swing	n/a	
