= Kenneth Alexander (economist) =

Scottish economist

Sir Kenneth Alexander

Chancellor of the University of Aberdeen
- In office 1986–1996
- Preceded by: The Lord Polwarth
- Succeeded by: The Lord Wilson of Tillyorn

Principal of the University of Stirling
- In office 1981–1986

Personal details
- Born: 14 March 1922 Edinburgh, Scotland
- Died: 27 March 2001 (aged 79)
- Spouse: Angela-May Lane
- Children: One son and four daughters
- Education: Bonar School of Economics, Dundee
- Profession: economist, university administrator

Sir Kenneth John Wilson Alexander FRSE (14 March 1922 – 27 March 2001) was a Scottish economist and university administrator. He also had strong links to the Scottish steel and shipbuilding industries.

== Life ==
He was born in Edinburgh, the son of William Wilson Alexander. He won a scholarship to George Heriot's School and then, after service in the RAF in the Second World War, studied at the Bonar College of Economics in Dundee (part of University College, Dundee) graduating with first class honours in 1949. He did postgraduate research at Leeds University 1949 to 1951 then lectured at Sheffield University until 1956 when he moved to lecture at Aberdeen University.

In 1963 Alexander was created the first Professor of Economics at Strathclyde University (1963–1980). In 1964 he was invited to deliver the inaugural Marlow (Scotland) Lecture to the Institution of Engineers and Shipbuilders in Scotland. He chose the subject 'Casual Labour and Labour Casualties'. Alexander was invited by the Labour government to chair a review of the future of adult education in Scotland. This report was published in 1975 under the title Adult Education: The Challenge of Change. Its main recommendation was to create a wider community education approach by linking adult education more closely with youth and community work, in order to be able to engage more people in lifelong learning. This led to the creation of local authority community education services.

In the 1960s he was brought in to resolve and rescue several Glasgow shipyards. He was Director of Upper Clyde Shipbuilders, Chairman of Govan Shipbuilders and Director of Fairfield Shipbuilding and Engineering Company. This ceased the restrictive practices introduced by the unions in exchange for guaranteed employment. He was also at the forefront of the economic reasoning to save Ravenscraig steelworks.

In 1976 he succeeded Sir Robert Grieve as Chairman of the Highlands & Islands Development Board (1976–1980). He was also a Director of Scottish Television and the Stakis Organisation. He was Chairman of the Committee on Adult Education in Scotland and in this role wrote the Alexander Report (1976). He was Chairman of the Edinburgh Book Festival from 1987 to 1991.

He left Strathclyde to serve as the Principal of Stirling University (1981–1986), and the Chancellor of Aberdeen University (1986–1996). Alexander was Vice-president of the Royal Society of Edinburgh (1993–1996).

Alexander received an Honorary Doctorate from Heriot-Watt University in September 1995.

At Aberdeen he was responsible for creation of the Elphinstone Institute: promoting the study of culture in north-east Scotland.

He died following a long illness on 27 March 2001.

== Family ==
He married Angela May Lane in 1949. They had one son and four daughters.

== Publications ==
- Economics in Business (1967)

Academic offices
Preceded by The Lord Polwarth	Chancellor of the University of Aberdeen; 1986–1996	Succeeded by The Lord Wilson of Tillyorn
