= Chancellor of the University of Aberdeen =

Titular head of the University of Aberdeen

The Chancellor of the University of Aberdeen is the titular head of the institution and President of the General Council. The Chancellor is elected by the university's graduate body, the General Council, and the role may be held for life. The main responsibilities of the role are to be an ambassador for the university, and to undertake other ceremonial duties, including conferring degrees on graduands on occasion.

The 11th Chancellor of the university is Her Majesty The Queen who succeeded The Lord Wilson of Tillyorn in January 2013.

== History ==
The present position was created with the amalgamation of the two existing ancient universities in Aberdeen, King's College (est. 1495) and Marischal College (est. 1593) in 1860. Prior to the merge, there were 23 Chancellors of King's College, the majority of whom were Bishops of the diocese, and 12 Chancellors of Marischal College composed equally of Earls Marischals and Peers.

== List of chancellors of the University of Aberdeen ==
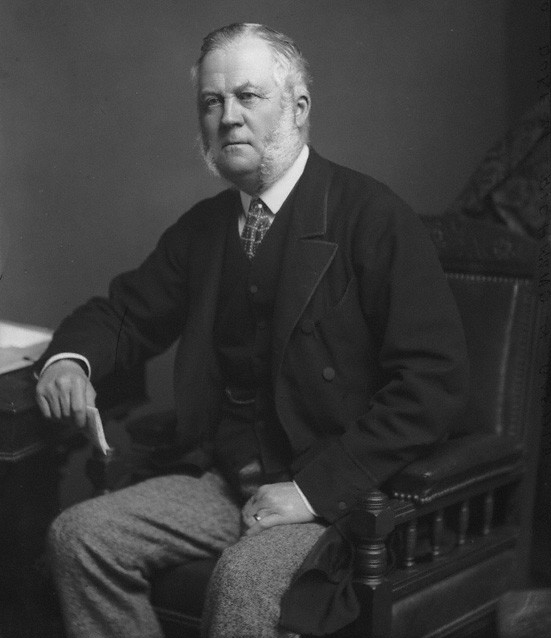
The Duke of Richmond, the first Chancellor of the University of Aberdeen installed in 1861

- 1861–1903 Charles Gordon-Lennox, 6th Duke of Richmond
- 1903–1914 Donald Smith, 1st Baron Strathcona and Mount Royal
- 1914–1917 Victor Bruce, 9th Earl of Elgin
- 1917–1928 Charles Gordon-Lennox, 7th Duke of Richmond
- 1928–1943 James Meston, 1st Baron Meston
- 1945–1950 Archibald Wavell, 1st Earl Wavell
- 1951–1965 Thomas Johnston
- 1966–1986 Henry Hepburne-Scott, 10th Lord Polwarth
- 1986–1996 Sir Kenneth Alexander
- 1997–2013 David Wilson, Baron Wilson of Tillyorn
- 2013–present Queen Camilla

== List of chancellors of former constituent colleges ==
=== Chancellors of King's College, Aberdeen ===
- 1577—1600 David Cunningham, Bishop of Aberdeen
- ?—? Patrick Forbes, Bishop of Aberdeen
- ?—? Alexander Forbes, Bishop of Aberdeen
- 1664—? Patrick Scougal, Bishop of Aberdeen
- 1827—? George Hamilton-Gordon, 4th Earl of Aberdeen

=== Chancellors of Marischal College ===
- 1593—1623 George Keith, 5th Earl Marischal
- 1623—1635 William Keith, 6th Earl Marischal
- 1635—1661 William Keith, 7th Earl Marischal
- 1661—1694 George Keith, 8th Earl Marischal
- 1694—1712 William Keith, 9th Earl Marischal
- 1712—17?? George Keith, 10th Earl Marischal
- 17??—1761 Archibald Campbell, 3rd Duke of Argyll (previously proposed as chancellor of King's College in 1716 but did not accept)
- 1761—1792 John Stuart, 3rd Earl of Bute
- 1793—1796 David Murray, 2nd Earl of Mansfield
- 1796—1814 William Eden, 1st Baron Auckland
- 1814—1836 George Gordon, 5th Duke of Gordon
- 1836—1860 Charles Gordon-Lennox, 5th Duke of Richmond

In 1643, George Gordon, 2nd Earl of Huntly was elected chancellor of the Caroline University of Aberdeen, however Marischal College members absented themselves from the meeting, whose result they didn't recognise.

== See also ==
- Principal of the University of Aberdeen
- Rector of the University of Aberdeen
- Ancient university governance in Scotland
