= J. Campbell Ker =

British colonial administrator and MP

James Campbell Ker, CSI, CIE (1878 – 28 December 1961) was a British colonial administrator in India and Unionist Party (Scotland) MP for Stirling and Clackmannan Western.

The son of the Rev. William Lee Ker of Kilwinning, Ayrshire, Ker was educated at the Irvine Academy, Glasgow University, where he took his MA with first-class honours in Mathematics and won the Eglinton Fellowship, and Gonville and Caius College, Cambridge, where took the BA.

He entered the Indian Civil Service in 1907, was personal assistant to the Director of Criminal Intelligence from 1907 to 1913, was on special duty in AHQ, Simla, 1914–17. He was Collector and District Magistrate of Kaira from 1918, Secretary to Government of Bombay in the General and Educational Department from 1920 to 1923, and private secretary to the Governor of Bombay from 1924 to 1929.

Ker was appointed a Companion of the Order of the Star of India (CSI) in the 1928 Birthday Honours.

He was elected in 1931, but stood down in 1935.

Parliament of the United Kingdom
Preceded by Tom Johnston	Member of Parliament for Stirling & Clackmannan West; 1931 – 1935	Succeeded by Tom Johnston
