= William Baxter (Scottish politician) =

Scottish Labour MP (1911-1979)

- Baxter in 1959

Member of Parliament for West Stirlingshire
- In office 8 October 1959 – 20 September 1974
- Preceded by: Alfred Balfour
- Succeeded by: Dennis Canavan

Personal details
- Born: 4 December 1911
- Died: 20 April 1979 (aged 67)
- Education: Heriot-Watt University
- Occupation: politician farmer

William Baxter (4 December 1911 – 20 April 1979) was a British Labour Party politician, building contractor, and farmer. He was a conscientious objector in the Second World War.

== Political career ==
After having served as a councillor, he was Member of Parliament (MP) for West Stirlingshire from 1959 until he stood down at the October 1974 general election.

He was asked to stand down by his Constituency Labour Party after the indecisive election of February 1974, when he appeared on television calling for an all-party government of national unity, and suggested that the Duke of Edinburgh could chair its meetings.

In 1961, as a protest against bipartisan support for British nuclear weapons, he voted against the Royal Air Force, Royal Navy, and British Army Estimates in the House of Commons, and was suspended from the Labour Party Whip from March 1961 until May 1963.

Baxter received an Honorary Doctorate from Heriot-Watt University in 1976.

Parliament of the United Kingdom
Preceded by Alfred Balfour	Member of Parliament for West Stirlingshire; 1959–Oct 1974	Succeeded by Dennis Canavan
