= 1955 Scottish representative peers election =

An election for 16 Scottish representative peers took place on Monday 23 May 1955 at the Parliament House in Edinburgh.

== Procedure ==
The venue for the meeting caused some difficulty as the general election was called for the week when the General Assembly of the Church of Scotland was due to meet; by tradition the Church would not meet on the day of the general election, which meant the only day for the Peers to meet was Monday 23 May. This was the day before the Church Assembly opened and the day on which the Lord High Commissioner to the General Assembly of the Church of Scotland took up residence at Holyrood Palace, which was the normal location for the Peers to meet. Instead it was decided the peers should meet at Parliament House, built for the Parliament of Scotland but now part of the law courts. The Lord President of the Court of Session and the Faculty of Advocates agreed to the use of Parliament House.

Accordingly, the date, time and place of the meeting was set in a Royal Proclamation of 6 May 1955. Lord Elphinstone, who held the role of Lord Clerk Register, presided for the last time. When the Principal Clerk of Session George Watson read the roll of Peers of Scotland, 113 names were read, and 32 answered that they were present. Lord Polwarth produced a proxy on behalf of the Duke of Montrose, and 22 Peers had submitted "Signed Lists" as a form of absent voting. Lord Elphinstone himself chose not to vote; this was the "customary but not compulsory practice" of the Lord Clerk Register.

== Result ==
Two new representative peers were elected who had not sat in the previous Parliament - Lord Forbes and Lord Reay.

| Peer | Votes |
|---|---|
| Earl of Haddington | 54 |
| Earl of Airlie | 54 |
| Lord Sempill | 54 |
| Lord Polwarth | 54 |
| Earl of Lindsay | 53 |
| Earl of Selkirk | 53 |
| Lord Balfour of Burleigh | 53 |
| Lord Fairfax of Cameron | 53 |
| Earl of Rothes | 52 |
| Earl of Breadalbane and Holland | 52 |
| Lord Saltoun | 52 |
| Earl of Caithness | 51 |
| Earl of Perth | 51 |
| Lord Sinclair | 41 |
| Lord Forbes | 37 |
| Lord Reay | 37 |
Unsuccessful
| Earl of Dundonald | 31 |
| Earl of Northesk | 18 |
| Viscount of Arbuthnott | 11 |
| Lord Belhaven and Stenton | 2 |
| Earl of Leven | 1 |

== Votes cast ==
| Peer voting | Peers voted for | | | | | | | | | | | | | | | | | | | | |
| | Rothes, E. | Caithness, E. | Perth, E. | Haddington, E. | Lindsay, E. | Airlie, E. | Leven, E. | Selkirk, E. | Northesk, E. | Dundonald, E. | Breadalbane, E. | Arbuthnott, V. | Forbes, L. | Saltoun, L. | Sinclair, L. | Sempill, L. | Balfour of Burleigh, L. | Fairfax of Cameron, L. | Reay, L. | Belhaven, L. | Polwarth, L. |
|---|---|---|---|---|---|---|---|---|---|---|---|---|---|---|---|---|---|---|---|---|---|
Peers present who answered to the calling of their titles
| Duke of Argyll | 1 | 1 | 1 | 1 | 1 | 1 | | 1 | | | 1 | | 1 | 1 | 1 | 1 | 1 | 1 | 1 | | 1 |
| Duke of Atholl | 1 | 1 | 1 | 1 | 1 | 1 | | 1 | | | 1 | | 1 | 1 | 1 | 1 | 1 | 1 | 1 | | 1 |
| Marquess of Huntly | 1 | 1 | 1 | 1 | 1 | 1 | | 1 | | | 1 | | 1 | 1 | 1 | 1 | 1 | 1 | 1 | | 1 |
| Marquess of Lothian | 1 | 1 | 1 | 1 | 1 | 1 | | 1 | 1 | | 1 | | 1 | 1 | | 1 | 1 | 1 | 1 | | 1 |
| Earl of Crawford | 1 | 1 | 1 | 1 | 1 | 1 | | 1 | | | 1 | | 1 | 1 | 1 | 1 | 1 | 1 | 1 | | 1 |
| Earl of Caithness | 1 | 1 | 1 | 1 | 1 | 1 | | 1 | | | 1 | | 1 | 1 | 1 | 1 | 1 | 1 | 1 | | 1 |
| Earl of Home | 1 | 1 | 1 | 1 | 1 | 1 | | 1 | | | 1 | | 1 | 1 | 1 | 1 | 1 | 1 | 1 | | 1 |
| Earl of Perth | 1 | 1 | 1 | 1 | 1 | 1 | | 1 | | 1 | 1 | | | 1 | 1 | 1 | 1 | 1 | 1 | | 1 |
| Earl of Strathmore and Kinghorn | 1 | 1 | 1 | 1 | 1 | 1 | | 1 | | 1 | 1 | | 1 | 1 | 1 | 1 | 1 | 1 | | | 1 |
| Earl of Haddington | 1 | 1 | 1 | 1 | 1 | 1 | | 1 | 1 | | 1 | | 1 | 1 | | 1 | 1 | 1 | 1 | | 1 |
| Earl of Lindsay | 1 | 1 | 1 | 1 | 1 | 1 | | 1 | 1 | 1 | 1 | | | 1 | | 1 | 1 | 1 | 1 | | 1 |
| Earl of Elgin | 1 | 1 | 1 | 1 | 1 | 1 | | 1 | | | 1 | | 1 | 1 | 1 | 1 | 1 | 1 | 1 | | 1 |
| Earl of Wemyss | 1 | 1 | 1 | 1 | 1 | 1 | | 1 | 1 | | 1 | | 1 | 1 | | 1 | 1 | 1 | 1 | | 1 |
| Earl of Selkirk | 1 | 1 | 1 | 1 | 1 | 1 | | 1 | 1 | | 1 | | 1 | 1 | | 1 | 1 | 1 | 1 | | 1 |
| Earl of Northesk | 1 | 1 | 1 | 1 | 1 | 1 | | 1 | 1 | 1 | 1 | | | 1 | | 1 | 1 | 1 | 1 | | 1 |
| Earl of Dundee | 1 | 1 | 1 | 1 | 1 | 1 | | 1 | | | 1 | | 1 | 1 | 1 | 1 | 1 | 1 | 1 | | 1 |
| Earl of Breadalbane | 1 | 1 | 1 | 1 | 1 | 1 | | 1 | | | 1 | | 1 | 1 | 1 | 1 | 1 | 1 | 1 | | 1 |
| Earl of Stair | 1 | 1 | 1 | 1 | 1 | 1 | | 1 | | | 1 | | 1 | 1 | 1 | 1 | 1 | 1 | 1 | | 1 |
| Earl of Glasgow | 1 | 1 | 1 | 1 | 1 | 1 | | 1 | 1 | 1 | 1 | | | 1 | 1 | 1 | 1 | 1 | | | 1 |
| Viscount of Arbuthnott | 1 | 1 | 1 | 1 | 1 | 1 | | 1 | | | 1 | | 1 | 1 | 1 | 1 | 1 | 1 | 1 | | 1 |
| Lord Forbes | 1 | 1 | 1 | 1 | 1 | 1 | | 1 | | 1 | 1 | | 1 | 1 | 1 | 1 | 1 | 1 | | | 1 |
| Lord Saltoun | 1 | 1 | 1 | 1 | 1 | 1 | | 1 | | 1 | 1 | | 1 | 1 | 1 | 1 | 1 | 1 | | | 1 |
| Lord Gray | 1 | 1 | 1 | 1 | 1 | 1 | | 1 | 1 | | 1 | | 1 | 1 | 1 | 1 | 1 | 1 | | | 1 |
| Lord Sinclair | 1 | 1 | 1 | 1 | 1 | 1 | | 1 | 1 | | 1 | | 1 | 1 | 1 | 1 | 1 | 1 | | | 1 |
| Lord Sempill | 1 | 1 | 1 | 1 | 1 | 1 | | 1 | | 1 | 1 | | 1 | 1 | 1 | 1 | 1 | 1 | | | 1 |
| Lord Elphinstone | | | | | | | | | | | | | | | | | | | | | |
| Lord Colville of Culross | | 1 | 1 | 1 | 1 | 1 | | 1 | | 1 | 1 | | 1 | 1 | 1 | 1 | 1 | 1 | 1 | | 1 |
| Lord Balfour of Burleigh | 1 | 1 | 1 | 1 | 1 | 1 | | 1 | 1 | 1 | 1 | | | 1 | | 1 | 1 | 1 | 1 | | 1 |
| Lord Fairfax of Cameron | 1 | 1 | 1 | 1 | 1 | 1 | | 1 | 1 | | 1 | | 1 | 1 | | 1 | 1 | 1 | 1 | | 1 |
| Lord Reay | 1 | 1 | 1 | 1 | 1 | 1 | | 1 | | 1 | 1 | | | 1 | 1 | 1 | 1 | 1 | 1 | | 1 |
| Lord Ruthven | 1 | | 1 | 1 | 1 | 1 | | 1 | | 1 | 1 | | 1 | 1 | 1 | 1 | 1 | 1 | 1 | | 1 |
| Lord Polwarth | 1 | 1 | 1 | 1 | 1 | 1 | | 1 | 1 | | 1 | | 1 | 1 | | 1 | 1 | 1 | 1 | | 1 |
Peers called as Proxies
| Lord Polwarth (Proxy for the Duke of Montrose) | 1 | 1 | 1 | 1 | 1 | 1 | | 1 | 1 | | 1 | | 1 | 1 | | 1 | 1 | 1 | 1 | | 1 |
Peers who had submitted Signed Lists
| Duke of Hamilton | 1 | 1 | 1 | 1 | 1 | 1 | | 1 | | 1 | 1 | | 1 | 1 | 1 | 1 | 1 | | 1 | | 1 |
| Duke of Buccleuch | 1 | 1 | 1 | 1 | 1 | 1 | | 1 | | 1 | | | 1 | 1 | 1 | 1 | 1 | 1 | 1 | | 1 |
| Earl of Sutherland | | 1 | 1 | 1 | | 1 | | 1 | 1 | 1 | 1 | | 1 | 1 | 1 | 1 | 1 | 1 | 1 | | 1 |
| Earl of Mar | 1 | | 1 | 1 | 1 | 1 | | | 1 | 1 | 1 | | 1 | 1 | 1 | 1 | 1 | 1 | 1 | | 1 |
| Earl of Rothes | 1 | 1 | 1 | 1 | 1 | 1 | | 1 | | 1 | 1 | 1 | | 1 | 1 | 1 | 1 | 1 | | | 1 |
| Earl of Eglinton | 1 | 1 | 1 | 1 | 1 | 1 | | 1 | | 1 | 1 | 1 | | 1 | 1 | 1 | 1 | 1 | | | 1 |
| Earl of Cassilis | 1 | 1 | 1 | 1 | 1 | 1 | | 1 | | 1 | 1 | 1 | | 1 | 1 | 1 | 1 | 1 | | | 1 |
| Earl of Abercorn | 1 | 1 | 1 | 1 | 1 | 1 | | 1 | 1 | 1 | 1 | | 1 | | 1 | 1 | | 1 | 1 | | 1 |
| Earl of Galloway | 1 | 1 | 1 | 1 | 1 | 1 | | 1 | | 1 | 1 | | 1 | 1 | 1 | 1 | 1 | 1 | | | 1 |
| Earl of Lauderdale | 1 | 1 | | 1 | 1 | 1 | | 1 | 1 | 1 | 1 | | 1 | | 1 | 1 | 1 | 1 | 1 | | 1 |
| Earl of Dumfries | 1 | 1 | | 1 | 1 | 1 | | 1 | | 1 | 1 | 1 | | 1 | 1 | 1 | 1 | 1 | 1 | | 1 |
| Earl of Southesk | 1 | 1 | 1 | 1 | 1 | 1 | | 1 | | 1 | 1 | | 1 | 1 | 1 | 1 | 1 | 1 | | | 1 |
| Earl of Dalhousie | 1 | 1 | 1 | 1 | 1 | 1 | | 1 | | 1 | 1 | 1 | | 1 | 1 | 1 | 1 | 1 | | | 1 |
| Earl of Airlie | 1 | 1 | 1 | 1 | 1 | 1 | | 1 | | 1 | 1 | 1 | | 1 | 1 | 1 | 1 | 1 | | | 1 |
| Earl of Dundonald | 1 | 1 | 1 | 1 | 1 | 1 | | 1 | | 1 | 1 | 1 | | 1 | 1 | 1 | 1 | 1 | | | 1 |
| Earl of Aberdeen | 1 | 1 | 1 | 1 | 1 | 1 | | 1 | | | 1 | 1 | 1 | 1 | | 1 | 1 | 1 | | 1 | 1 |
| Earl of Rosebery | 1 | 1 | 1 | 1 | 1 | 1 | | 1 | | 1 | 1 | 1 | | 1 | 1 | 1 | 1 | 1 | | | 1 |
| Viscount of Stormont | 1 | 1 | 1 | 1 | 1 | 1 | | 1 | | | 1 | 1 | | 1 | 1 | 1 | 1 | 1 | 1 | | 1 |
| Lord Herries | 1 | 1 | 1 | 1 | 1 | 1 | | 1 | | 1 | 1 | | | 1 | 1 | 1 | 1 | 1 | 1 | | 1 |
| Lord Napier | 1 | | 1 | 1 | 1 | 1 | | 1 | 1 | 1 | 1 | | 1 | 1 | | 1 | 1 | 1 | 1 | | 1 |
| Lord Elibank | 1 | 1 | | 1 | 1 | 1 | | 1 | | | | 1 | 1 | 1 | 1 | 1 | 1 | 1 | 1 | 1 | 1 |
| Lord Rollo | 1 | 1 | 1 | 1 | 1 | 1 | 1 | 1 | | 1 | 1 | | | 1 | | 1 | 1 | 1 | 1 | | 1 |

== See also ==
- List of Scottish representative peers
