= David Wilson, Baron Wilson of Tillyorn =

Administrator and diplomat from England (born 1935)

The Right Honourable The Lord Wilson of Tillyorn KT GCMG FRSE
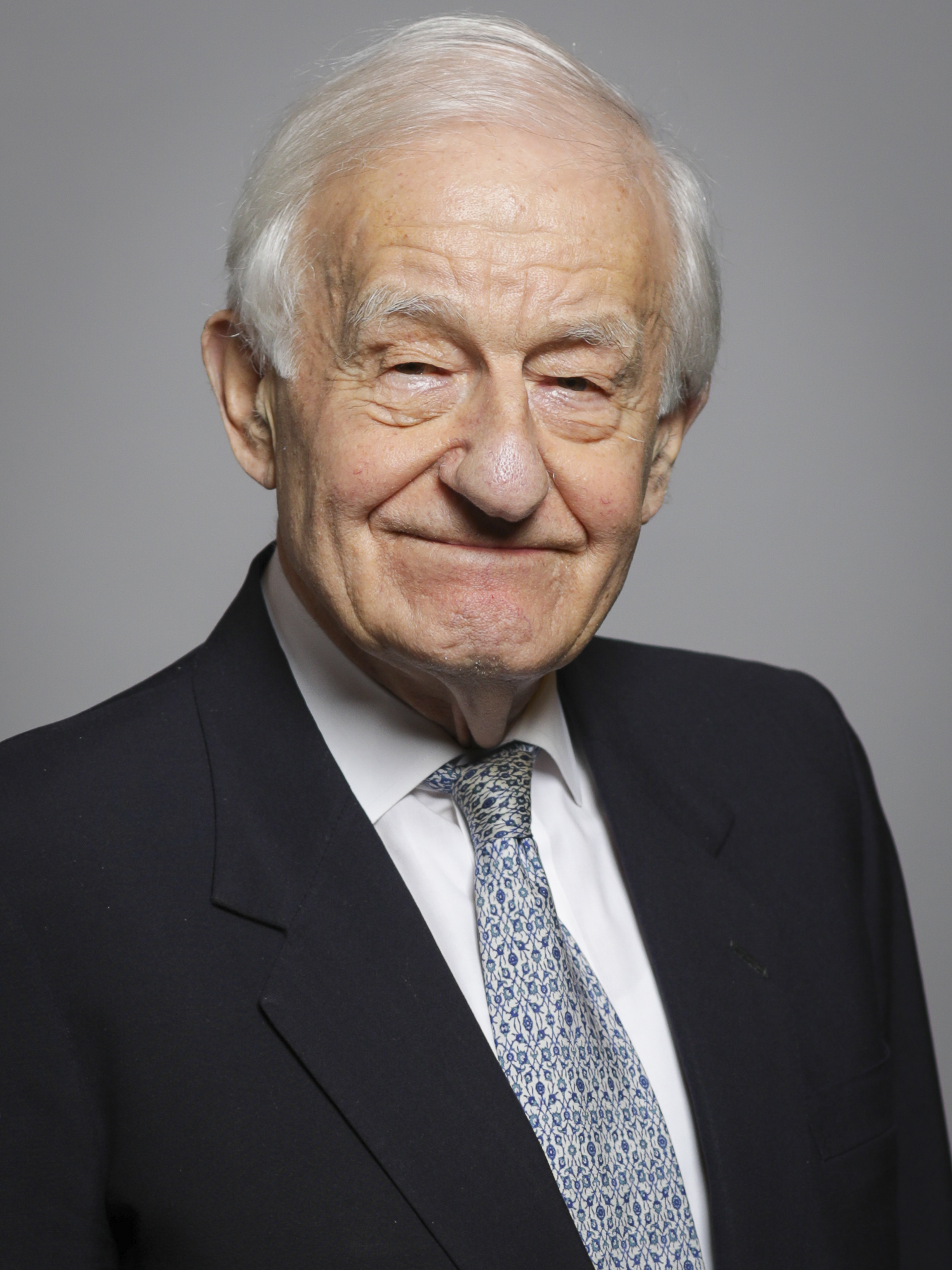
- Official portrait, 2019

27th Governor of Hong Kong
- In office 9 April 1987 – 3 July 1992
- Monarch: Elizabeth II
- Chief Secretary: Sir David Ford
- Preceded by: Edward Youde
- Succeeded by: Chris Patten

Lord High Commissioner to the General Assembly of the Church of Scotland
- In office 11 April 2010 – 20 July 2011
- Preceded by: George Reid
- Succeeded by: The Lord Selkirk of Douglas

President of the Royal Society of Edinburgh
- In office 3 September 2008 – 4 July 2011
- Preceded by: Michael Atiyah
- Succeeded by: John Arbuthnott

Member of the House of Lords
- Lord Temporal
- Life peerage 14 February 1992 – 12 February 2021
Academic positions
Chancellor of the University of Aberdeen
In office 6 June 1997 – 6 January 2013
Preceded by	Sir Kenneth Alexander
Succeeded by	Queen Camilla
Master of Peterhouse, Cambridge
In office 1 January 2002 – 3 March 2008
Preceded by	John Meurig Thomas
Succeeded by	Adrian Dixon

Personal details
- Born: David Clive Wilson; 14 February 1935 (age 91) Alloa, Clackmannanshire, Scotland
- Spouse: Natasha Helen Mary Alexander (m. 1967)
- Children: 2, including Peter Wilson
- Education: Keble College, Oxford (MA); University of London (PhD); University of Hong Kong (diploma); Trinity College, Glenalmond
- Profession: Colonial administrator, diplomat, sinologist

Chinese name
- Traditional Chinese: 衛奕信
- Simplified Chinese: 卫奕信
Transcriptions
Standard Mandarin
- Hanyu Pinyin: Wèi Yìxìn
Yue: Cantonese
- Jyutping: wai6 jik6 seon3

David Clive Wilson, Baron Wilson of Tillyorn (Chinese: 衛奕信, born 14 February 1935) is a retired British administrator, diplomat and Sinologist. He was the penultimate Commander-in-Chief and 27th Governor of Hong Kong (from 1987 to 1992). He served as Lord High Commissioner to the General Assembly of the Church of Scotland, the British Monarch's representative to the Assembly, in 2010 and 2011. He is one of the two living former governors of Hong Kong; the other is Chris Patten. Lord Wilson retired from the House of Lords on 12 February 2021 after sitting as a crossbencher for more than 28 years.

== Early life and career ==
Wilson was born in Alloa in Scotland on 14 February 1935 and was educated at Trinity College, Glenalmond, and Keble College, Oxford (1955–58, Master of Arts), and the School of Oriental and African Studies, University of London (PhD in contemporary Chinese history, 1973). He studied Chinese at the University of Hong Kong from 1960 to 1962 and then served in the British Mission in Beijing. He is fluent in Mandarin and has mastered basic Cantonese and spent 10 of his 30 years as a diplomat in China.

In 1968 Wilson resigned from the Foreign and Commonwealth Office to edit The China Quarterly at the School of Oriental and African Studies. After rejoining the Diplomatic Service in 1974 he worked in the Cabinet Office and then, from 1977 to 1981, as Political Adviser to Sir Murray MacLehose, the then Governor of Hong Kong. Next, Wilson became Head of Southern European Department in the FCO and then Assistant Under Secretary for Asia and the Pacific, during which time he was head of the British side of the Working Group engaged in drafting the 1984 Sino-British Joint Declaration on Hong Kong and then, in 1984, the first Senior British Representative on the Sino-British Joint Liaison Group set up under the Joint Declaration. When Sir Edward Youde died in Beijing on 5 December 1986, Wilson replaced him to become the Governor of Hong Kong on 9 April 1987.

== Hong Kong governorship ==
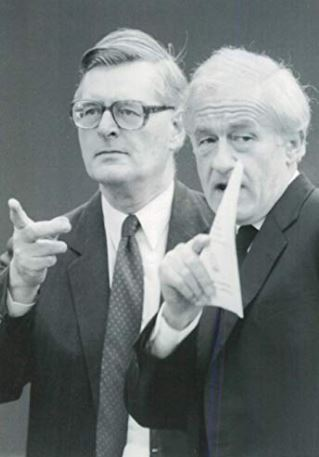
Wilson (right) in 1991 with John Yaxley

As governor, Wilson had to deal with the fallout in Hong Kong from Black Monday in October 1987, from which the colony's stock exchange had been among the most hit by the financial crash. He also dealt with the fallout from the 1989 Tiananmen Square protests in Beijing, and encountered the Vietnamese refugee problem, which steadily grew worse and led to the 1988 policy of repatriating those found not to qualify for refugee status (see bắt đầu từ nay). In October 1989, Wilson proposed, in the Governor's Annual Policy Address, the building of an airport on Lantau Island, known as the Rose Garden Project. The proposal was created out of concern that Kai Tak Airport, which had been in use since the beginning of aviation in Hong Kong, was not equipped to handle modern aviation needs.

In December 1991, Britain announced the removal of Wilson as governor; he had been widely criticised by Hong Kong's pro-democracy camp, three months after their strong performance in Hong Kong's first direct elections to the Legislative Council. Wilson left Hong Kong in June 1992 following the completion of his five-year term as governor. Before his retirement, Wilson embarked on political reforms that paved the way for eighteen legislators of the Legislative Council to be directly elected by the people of Hong Kong. Wilson was succeeded by Chris Patten, a former Member of Parliament who had been recently defeated in the UK general election before being appointed.

=== Name in Chinese ===
When Wilson studied Mandarin Chinese at the University of Hong Kong, he was given the Chinese name Wei Dewei or Ngai Tak-Ngai (魏德巍; ngai6 dak1 ngai4); "Wei" was short for "Wilson", while "Dewei" is a Chinese transliteration of David. However, when he arrived in Hong Kong to take up the position of Governor of Hong Kong, it was noted that the Cantonese pronunciation of his earlier name sounded almost nothing like his actual name.

Nicholas Kristof of The New York Times commented that Wilson's previous Chinese name sounded too much like "hypocrisy to the extent of danger" (偽得危; ngai6 dak1 ngai4). Kristof also noted that the surname and the third character can each be divided into components meaning "1,800 female ghosts" (千八女鬼). According to Chan Chung-kwong of RTHK, some locals referred to the name as "two ghosts knocking at the door" (雙鬼拍門; soeng1 gwai2 paak3 mun4), which is unlucky and inappropriate for a governor's name.

When Wilson assumed his position as Governor of Hong Kong, he changed his Chinese name to Wai Yik-Shun (衛奕信; wai6 jik6 seon3), the Cantonese pronunciation of which is more similar to his English name. The new name also has a more favourable meaning and was composed of 33 strokes, said to be a lucky number.

== Post-governorship ==
After his governorship and elevation to a life peerage with the title Baron Wilson of Tillyorn, of Finzean in the District of Kincardine and Deeside and of Fanling in Hong Kong in 1992, Wilson became the chairman of the energy company Scottish Hydro Electric plc. (later Scottish and Southern Energy) based in Perth, Scotland from 1993 to 2000. He was a member of the board of the British Council (and chairman of its Scottish Committee) from 1993 to 2002; a director of the Martin Currie Pacific Trust from 1993 to 2002 and Chairman of the Trustees of the National Museums of Scotland from 2002 to 2006. In 1996 he was appointed a vice-president of the Royal Scottish Geographical Society; and he was the Chancellor of the University of Aberdeen from 1997 to 2013, succeeded by the Duchess of Rothesay. He was president of the Bhutan Society of the UK (1993–2008), the Hong Kong Society (1994– ) and the Hong Kong Association (1994– ). Wilson was made a Knight of the Thistle in 2000. He served as Master of Peterhouse, Cambridge from 2002 to 2008. He was President of the Royal Society of Edinburgh from October 2008 to October 2011, when he was succeeded by Sir John Arbuthnott. In January 2010 he was appointed Lord High Commissioner to the General Assembly of the Church of Scotland for 2010.

Wilson informed the Clerk of the Parliaments that he would retire from the House of Lords on 12 February 2021 under the provisions of the House of Lords Reform Act 2014.

== Places named after him ==
The 78-kilometre Wilson Trail, containing ten hiking segments aligned north–south in Hong Kong, is named after him, as is the Lord Wilson Heritage Trust (衛奕信勳爵文物信託) established in December 1992 to preserve and conserve Hong Kong's heritage.

== Personal life ==
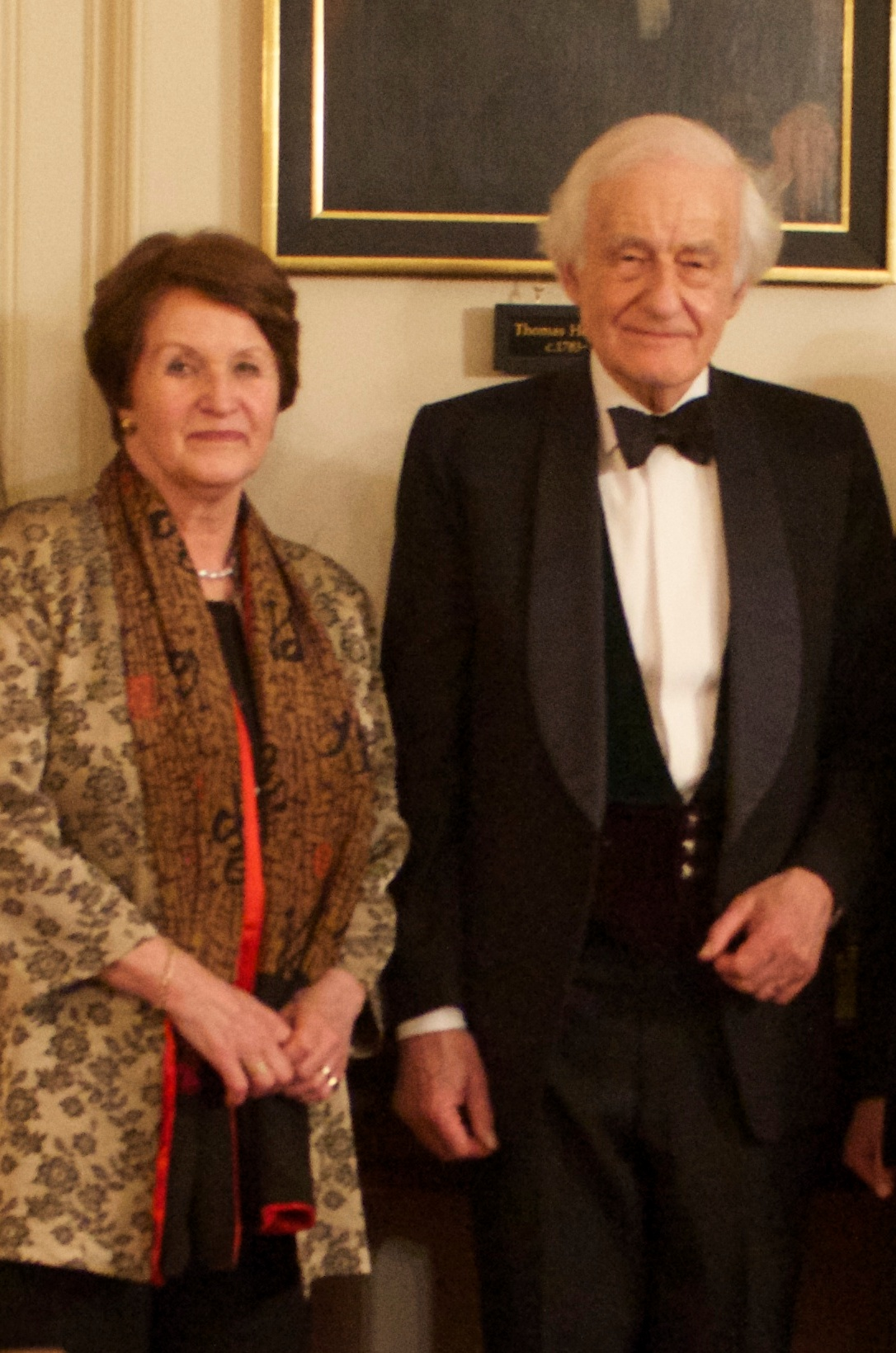
David and Natasha Wilson at the University of Cambridge, March 2013

Wilson married Natasha Helen Mary Alexander, daughter of Bernard Gustav Alexander, in 1967 and they have two sons, Peter and Andrew.

== Views ==
Wilson defended the Hong Kong Police during the 2014 Hong Kong protests, claiming the actions taken by the police were "largely proportionate". During the 2019 Hong Kong protests, he was against the British government's pro-movement perspective and stated "we cannot and should not try to tell the Hong Kong Government what to do" in a speech given at the House of Lords. He believes such demonstrations "started peacefully" with "a majority of young people who were clearly well-intentioned and concerned about their own future", but continued with an increasing amount of violence; he believed the police brutality during the event should be remedied, but "it is worth remembering not only that the police have been under enormous strain week after week, weekend after weekend, but that their families have also been threatened".

Wilson was criticised by the pro-democracy camp for not moving more quickly towards a fully elected Legislature based on universal suffrage and for paying too much attention to the views of the Government in China in agreeing arrangements for a process of increasing the number of fully elected seats up to and beyond the transfer of sovereignty in 1997.

== Honours ==
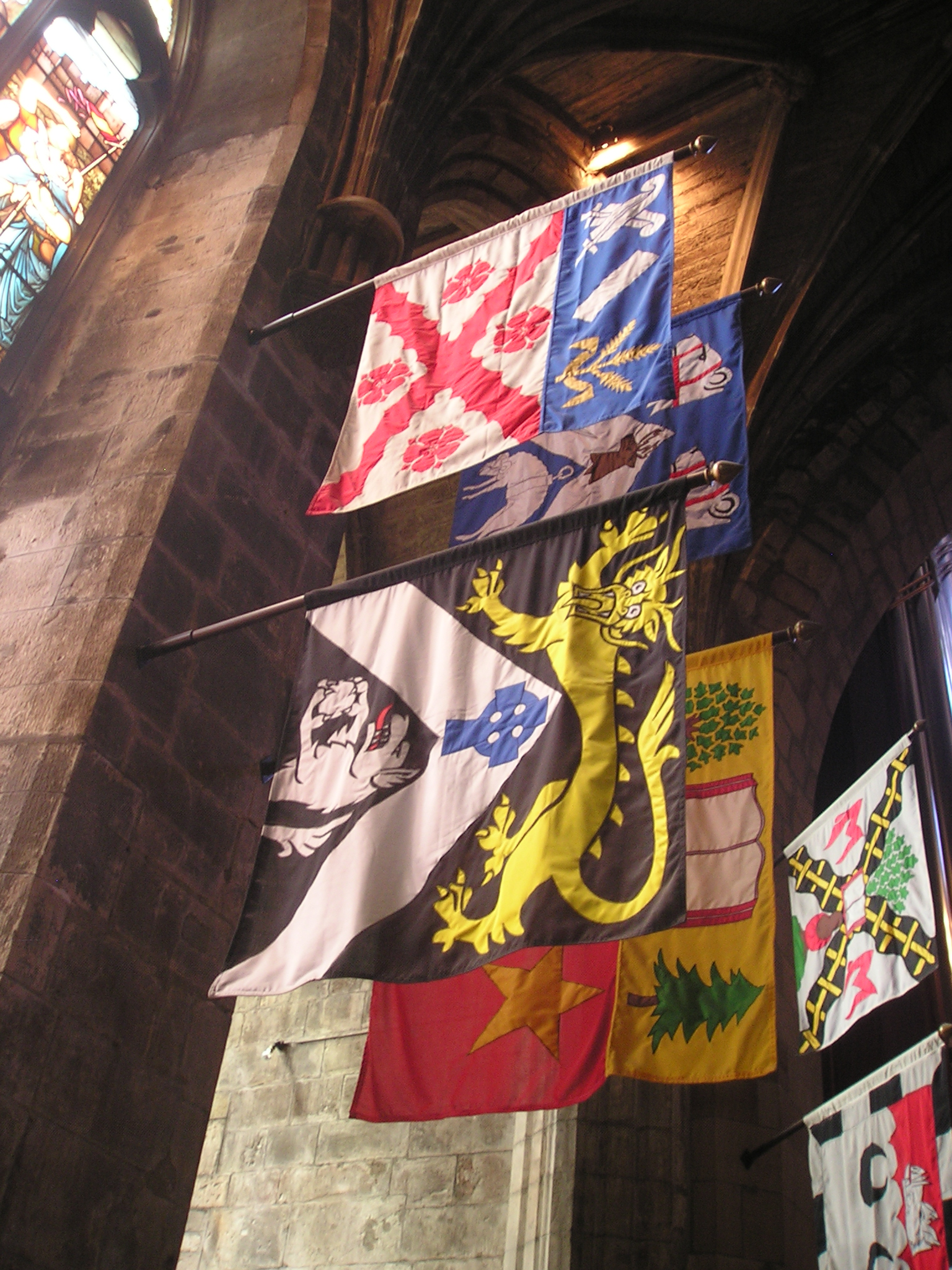
Lord Wilson of Tillyorn's heraldic banner as a Knight of the Order of the Thistle in St Giles' Cathedral, Edinburgh

- Knight of the Order of the Thistle (KT), 2000
- Knight Grand Cross of the Order of St Michael and St George (GCMG), 1991 New Year Honours
- Honorary Fellowship of Keble College, Oxford, 1987
- Honorary degrees from the University of Sydney (1991), University of Abertay Dundee (1993), Chinese University of Hong Kong (1996), University of Aberdeen (2004) and the University of Hong Kong (2006)

Viceregal styles of David Wilson (1987-1992)
- Reference style: His Excellency the Right Honourable
- Spoken style: Your Excellency

== Styles ==
- Mr David Clive Wilson (1937–1972)
- Dr David Clive Wilson (1972–1987)
- His Excellency The Rt Hon. Sir David Clive Wilson, KCMG (advanced GCMG in 1991) (1987–1992)
- The Rt Hon. The Lord Wilson of Tillyorn, GCMG (1992–2000)
- The Rt Hon. The Lord Wilson of Tillyorn, KT, GCMG (2000–present)

== Arms ==
Coat of arms of David Wilson, Baron Wilson of Tillyorn
Coronet Coronet of a Baron Crest A Talbot's Head erased Sable langued Gules gorged of a Collar Argent charged with two Mullets Gules Escutcheon Sable on a Chevron Argent between a Dragon passant guardant Or in chief and a Demi Wolf holding in its paws a Pearl proper in base a Celtic Cross Azure Orders Order of the Thistle

Political offices
Preceded by Sir Edward Youde	Governor of Hong Kong; 1987–1992	Succeeded by Chris Patten
Legislative Council of Hong Kong
Preceded by Sir Edward Youde	President of the Legislative Council; 1987–1992	Succeeded by Chris Patten
Academic offices
Preceded by Sir Kenneth Alexander	Chancellor of the University of Aberdeen; 1997–2013	Succeeded by The Duchess of Rothesay (later The Queen)
Preceded by Sir John Meurig Thomas	Master of Peterhouse, Cambridge; 2002–2008	Succeeded by Adrian Dixon
Preceded by Sir Michael Atiyah	President of the Royal Society of Edinburgh; 2008–2011	Succeeded by Sir John Arbuthnott
Orders of precedence in the United Kingdom
Preceded by The Lord Rodgers of Quarry Bank	Gentlemen; Baron Wilson of Tillyorn	Followed by The Lord Wakeham
