= Alfred Balfour =

British politician (1885–1963)

Member of Parliament for West Stirlingshire
- In office 5 July 1945 – 18 September 1959
- Preceded by: Thomas Johnston
- Succeeded by: William Baxter

Personal details
- Born: 7 September 1885 Aberdeen, Scotland
- Died: 26 January 1963 (aged 77)
- Party: Labour

Alfred Balfour (7 September 1885 – 26 January 1963) was a British railwayman and politician. He worked his way up from being a baker's message boy to serve as a member of parliament for fourteen years. He was marked by his loyalty to party and near silence in the House of Commons where he waited eight years after being elected before making his maiden and only speech.

== Youth ==
Balfour was the son of a shoemaker, and was born in Aberdeen. He went only to elementary school, before beginning work as a baker's message boy. He later worked in a sawmill, in a tannery, and as a carter before joining the railways at the age of 19. In his youth he was a keen amateur boxer, and was for a time the amateur bantamweight boxing champion of the North of Scotland.

== Railways ==
In 1913 he married Margaret Grant; they had three daughters. Balfour continued his education in evening classes including through the Workers' Educational Association and the National Council of Labour Colleges, and he also became an active member of the National Union of Railwaymen. He was Secretary of the Aberdeen branch of the NUR for twenty years, and represented railwaymen on Aberdeen Trades Council. For many years, Balfour was a member of the NUR Executive. His job was eventually to be parcels foreman at Aberdeen railway station, and he was chairman of the employees' side of the sectional council of the London, Midland and Scottish Railway for twelve years.

== Politics ==
Through his union activities, Balfour became active in the Labour Party, being made a delegate to the Labour Party annual conference, and he served on Aberdeen Town Council from 1941 until he stood down in 1942. It was his prominence in the railway union which led to his selection as Labour candidate for West Stirlingshire at the 1945 general election. He followed Thomas Johnston, who was Secretary of State for Scotland in the war-time Coalition.

== Parliamentary activity ==
Balfour won the seat, but his election was unusual as he had a reduced majority compared to the 1935 general election; the election as a whole showed a strong movement to the Labour Party. In Parliament Balfour became a very low-profile Member. He made no speeches at all, and asked only a handful of questions in the first two years before contributing nothing in the last three sessions.

His silence was accompanied by invariable loyalty to the party whip. In a free vote in December 1947 he supported a motion to cut the proposed additional allowance paid to Princess Elizabeth after her marriage.

In the 1950 general election Balfour was re-elected with a majority increased to over 4,000, and in the 1951 election it increased again; both were against the national trend.

== Belated maiden speech ==
On 14 July 1953, Balfour finally broke eight years' silence in the chamber to make his maiden speech in a debate on industry in Scotland. As he began speaking, he explained that he had tried to get in to speak in other debates but found it so difficult that it was hardly worthwhile. He then observed "People get up here from time to time and keep us here for hours on end, and I have said 'What's the use of inflicting another torture upon the House?'" In the main body of his speech he opposed the policy of building new towns when old towns, including those in his constituency, were becoming derelict.

His activity in the remainder of the Parliament was confined to asking several written Parliamentary Questions. In May 1954 he asked a written question about the cost of refurbishing the flat of the Secretary to the Lord Great Chamberlain on the Parliamentary Estate.

== Retirement ==
Re-elected with a reduced majority in the 1955 general election, Balfour did not make any further speeches or ask any questions (either oral or written) before announcing in 1958 that he would not be a candidate for re-election.

In his last months in the House of Commons, Balfour at first signed a motion put down by Malcolm Macmillan opposing the transfer of some NATO-assigned United States Air Force nuclear bombers from France to United Kingdom bases. When party leader Hugh Gaitskell called on Labour members to withdraw their names, Balfour complied.

Parliament of the United Kingdom
| Preceded by Thomas Johnston | Member of Parliament for West Stirlingshire; 1945 – 1959 | Succeeded by William Baxter |
