= 1959 Scottish representative peers election =

The Principal Clerk of Session reads the roll of Peers of Scotland. Copyright George Outram & Co Ltd

An election for 16 Scottish representative peers took place on 6 October 1959 at the Palace of Holyroodhouse in Edinburgh. It turned out to be the last election for representative peers as in 1963 all holders of titles in the Peerage of Scotland were made eligible to sit in the House of Lords.

== Procedure ==
The date, time and place of the meeting was set in a Royal Proclamation of 18 September 1959, issued on the day that the previous Parliament was dissolved. The Duke of Buccleuch and Queensberry, who held the role of Lord Clerk Register, presided. When the Principal Clerk of Session George Macdonald read the roll of Peers of Scotland, 115 names were read, and 25 answered that they were present. None of the Peers produced any proxies for those who were absent, but 28 Peers had submitted "Signed Lists" as a form of absent voting. The Duke of Buccleuch himself chose not to vote; this was the "customary but not compulsory practice" of the Lord Clerk Register.

== Result ==
Four new representative peers were elected who had not sat in the previous Parliament - the Earls of Mar and Kellie, Northesk, and Dundonald, and Lord Sinclair.

Peer	Votes
Duke of Atholl	52
Earl of Selkirk	52
Earl of Caithness	51
Earl of Perth	51
Earl of Airlie	51
Lord Forbes	51
Lord Saltoun	51
Lord Sinclair	51
Lord Sempill	51
Lord Balfour of Burleigh	51
Lord Polwarth	51
Earl of Haddington	50
Lord Fairfax of Cameron	50
Earl of Mar and Kellie	44
Earl of Dundonald	40
Earl of Northesk	35
Unsuccessful
Lord Gray	22
Earl of Rothes	5
Earl of Mar	4
Lord Reay	4
Earl of Leven	3
Earl of Lindsay	2
Marquess of Queensberry	1
Earl of Lauderdale	1
Earl of Orkney	1
Earl of Breadalbane and Holland	1
Viscount of Falkland	1
Viscount of Arbuthnott	1
Lord Belhaven and Stenton	1

== Votes cast ==
Peer voting	Peers voted for																												
	Atholl, D.	Queensbury, M.	Mar, E.	Rothes, E.	Caithness, E.	Mar (1565) and Kellie, E.	Perth, E.	Haddington, E.	Lauderdale, E.	Lindsay, E.	Airlie, E.	Leven, E.	Selkirk, E.	Northesk, E.	Dundonald, E.	Orkney, E.	Breadalbane, E.	Falkland, V.	Arbuthnott, V.	Forbes, L.	Saltoun, L.	Gray, L.	Sinclair, L.	Sempill, L.	Balfour of Burleigh, L.	Fairfax of Cameron, L.	Reay, L.	Belhaven, L.	Polwarth, L.
Peers present who answered to the calling of their titles
Duke of Hamilton	1				1	1	1	1			1		1	1	1					1	1		1	1	1	1			1
Duke of Buccleuch																													
Duke of Atholl	1				1	1	1	1			1		1	1	1					1	1	1	1	1	1				1
Marquis of Huntly	1				1	1	1	1			1		1	1						1	1	1	1	1	1	1			1
Marquis of Tweeddale	1				1	1	1	1			1		1	1	1					1	1		1	1	1	1			1
Marquis of Lothian	1				1	1	1	1			1		1	1	1					1	1		1	1	1	1			1
Earl of Cassilis	1				1	1	1	1			1		1	1	1					1	1	1		1	1	1			1
Earl of Mar (1565) and Kellie	1				1	1	1	1			1		1		1					1	1	1	1	1	1	1			1
Earl of Perth	1				1	1	1	1			1		1	1	1					1	1		1	1	1	1			1
Earl of Haddington	1				1	1	1	1			1		1	1						1	1	1	1	1	1	1			1
Earl of Southesk	1				1	1	1	1			1		1	1	1					1	1		1	1	1	1			1
Earl of Wemyss	1				1	1	1	1			1		1	1	1					1	1		1	1	1	1			1
Earl of Selkirk	1				1	1	1	1			1		1	1	1					1	1		1	1	1	1			1
Earl of Dundee	1				1	1	1	1			1		1		1					1	1	1	1	1	1	1			1
Earl of Dundonald	1				1	1	1	1			1		1		1					1	1	1	1	1	1	1			1
Earl of Stair	1				1	1	1	1			1		1	1	1					1	1		1	1	1	1			1
Earl of Rosebery	1				1	1	1	1			1		1	1						1	1	1	1	1	1	1			1
Viscount of Stormont	1				1	1	1	1			1		1	1	1					1	1		1	1	1	1			1
Viscount of Arbuthnott	1				1	1	1	1			1		1	1	1					1	1		1	1	1	1			1
Lord Forbes	1				1	1	1	1			1		1		1					1	1	1	1	1	1	1			1
Lord Saltoun	1				1	1	1	1			1		1		1					1	1	1	1	1	1	1			1
Lord Gray	1				1	1	1	1			1		1		1					1	1	1	1	1	1	1			1
Lord Sinclair	1				1	1	1	1			1		1		1					1	1	1	1	1	1	1			1
Lord Sempill	1				1	1	1	1			1		1	1	1					1	1		1	1	1	1			1
Lord Polwarth	1				1	1	1	1			1		1	1	1					1	1		1	1	1	1			1
Peers who had submitted Signed Lists
Duke of Argyll	1		1		1		1	1			1		1	1	1					1		1	1	1	1	1			1
Duke of Montrose	1			1			1	1		1	1		1				1			1	1		1	1	1	1	1		1
Earl of Sutherland	1				1	1	1	1			1	1	1	1						1	1		1	1	1	1			1
Earl of Mar	1			1	1		1	1		1	1		1	1						1	1		1	1	1	1			1
Earl of Rothes	1				1	1	1	1			1		1	1	1					1	1		1	1	1	1			1
Earl of Home	1				1	1	1	1			1		1	1	1					1	1		1	1	1	1			1
Earl of Galloway	1				1	1	1	1			1		1	1	1					1	1		1	1	1	1			1
Earl of Lindsay	1				1	1	1	1			1		1	1	1					1	1		1	1	1	1			1
Earl of Aberdeen	1				1	1	1	1			1		1	1	1					1	1		1	1	1	1			1
Earl of Glasgow	1				1	1	1	1			1		1	1	1					1	1		1	1	1	1			1
Lord Fairfax of Cameron	1				1	1	1	1			1		1	1	1					1	1		1	1	1	1			1
Earl of Eglinton	1				1	1	1	1			1		1		1					1	1	1	1	1	1	1			1
Earl of Caithness	1				1	1	1	1			1		1		1					1	1	1	1	1	1	1			1
Earl of Elgin	1				1	1	1	1			1		1		1					1	1	1	1	1	1	1			1
Lord Balfour of Burleigh	1				1	1	1	1			1		1		1					1	1	1	1	1	1	1			1
Lord Elibank	1				1	1	1	1			1		1		1					1	1	1	1	1	1	1			1
Lord Kinnaird	1				1	1	1	1			1		1		1					1	1	1	1	1	1	1			1
Earl of Strathmore and Kinghorne	1			1	1		1	1			1	1	1	1						1	1		1	1	1	1			1
Earl of Dumfries	1				1	1	1	1			1		1	1						1	1		1	1	1	1	1		1
Earl of Dalhousie	1				1	1	1	1			1		1							1	1		1	1	1	1			1
Earl of Airlie	1				1	1	1	1			1		1						1	1	1		1	1	1	1			1
Earl of Breadalbane	1	1	1	1	1				1		1	1	1	1	1	1		1			1		1				1		
Lord Herries	1		1		1		1				1		1	1	1					1	1	1	1	1	1	1			1
Lord Elphinstone	1		1		1		1	1			1		1	1						1	1		1	1	1	1	1		1
Lord Colville of Culross	1				1	1	1	1			1		1	1						1	1	1	1	1	1	1			1
Lord Napier	1			1	1	1	1	1			1		1		1					1	1		1	1	1	1			1
Lord Reay	1				1		1	1			1		1	1	1					1	1	1	1	1	1	1			1
Lord Rollo	1				1	1	1	1					1	1	1					1	1		1	1	1	1		1	1

== See also ==
- List of Scottish representative peers
