= Guy Fanshawe =

Captain Guy Dalrymple Fanshawe (30 March 1882 – 19 June 1962) was a Royal Navy officer who also served as Unionist Party (Scotland) MP for Stirling and Clackmannan Western from 1924 to 1929.

== Naval career ==
Fanshawe was born in Falmouth to Captain (later Admiral of the Fleet Sir) Arthur Dalrymple Fanshawe (1847–1936) by his wife Sarah Frances Fox. He came from a family with a long tradition of naval service, his grandfather Sir Edward Gennys Fanshawe had also been an Admiral.

He passed out of Britannia Naval College in December 1897, sixty-first out of the sixty-four cadets graduating, with 1178 marks. After joining the Royal Navy, he was promoted to acting sub-lieutenant on 15 November 1901 and subsequently confirmed in that rank from the same date. In November 1902 he was ordered for a posting with the destroyer HMS Syren, but this was cancelled and the following month he was reassigned to the torpedo gunboat HMS Alarm. In early February 1903 he was briefly posted to HMS Latona, depot ship for submarines, and from 18 February 1903 he was in command of Torpedo Boat No. 50.

Fanshawe was promoted to the rank of lieutenant on 15 August 1903, served as a commander in World War I, and retired from the Navy in 1923 at his own request. He was promoted to captain in retirement on 30 March 1927.

== Political career ==
Guy Fanshawe was MP for West Stirlingshire from October 29, 1924, to May 30, 1929. He made his maiden speech on 6 March 1925 on the subject of industrial peace. He was laterally PPS to the Secretary of State for Dominions and Colonies. In the 1929 election he was defeated by Johnston, who was returned with a majority of 3590, albeit with a larger electorate.

According to Peter Joynson, Fanshawe, having been defeated in the Stirling seat, decided to seek and nurse a seat in Norfolk. In May 1930 he left Dalveagh to reside at Bixley Manor in Norwich, having been adopted as the Unionist candidate for East Norfolk.

Fanshawe never became a Unionist candidate in Norfolk, which were generally safe Liberal seats. He was put forward as a Conservative candidate for East Norfolk in 1930 but did not contest the subsequent election “in the interest of national unity.” ”.

In the late 1930s, Fanshawe was selected as the National Conservative candidate for the Frome Division in Somerset. Around the same time, he asked to be considered for the Wells seat. With war intervening, the situation changed, and in early 1941, he was called back to London to assist the war effort.

Parliament of the United Kingdom
Preceded by Tom Johnston	Member of Parliament for Stirling and Clackmannan West; 1924 – 1929	Succeeded by Tom Johnston
