= Eric Joyce =

Scottish politician (born 1960)

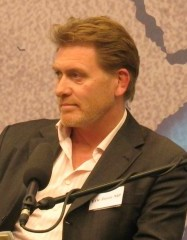
- Joyce in 2010

Shadow Minister for Northern Ireland
- In office 21 June 2010 – 18 November 2010
- Leader: Ed Miliband
- Preceded by: Laurence Robertson
- Succeeded by: Stephen Pound

Member of Parliament for Falkirk Falkirk West (2000–2005)
- In office 21 December 2000 – 30 March 2015
- Preceded by: Dennis Canavan
- Succeeded by: John McNally

Personal details
- Born: Eric Stuart Joyce; 13 October 1960 (age 66) Perth, Scotland
- Party: Independent
- Other political affiliations: Labour (1999–2012)
- Education: University of Stirling
- Website: http://www.ericjoyce.co.uk/

Military service
- Allegiance: United Kingdom
- Branch/service: British Army
- Years of service: 1978–1981; 1987–1999
- Rank: Major
- Unit: Black Watch; Royal Army Educational Corps; Adjutant General's Corps

Eric Stuart Joyce (born 13 October 1960) is a British politician, former military officer and convicted child sex offender. A former member of the Labour Party, he served as Member of Parliament (MP) for Falkirk, formerly Falkirk West, from 2000 to 2015.

Joining the army in his teens, Joyce served as a private in the Black Watch before attending the University of Stirling and subsequently receiving a commission in the Royal Army Educational Corps. He resigned from the army under threat of discharge in 1999 at the rank of major after being found to have broken Queen's Regulations. He then worked as the Public Affairs Officer at the Commission for Racial Equality (Scotland).

Joyce was first elected to the British House of Commons in the 2000 Falkirk West by-election. From 2003, Joyce served as a parliamentary private secretary (PPS) to several UK government ministers. He resigned as the PPS to Bob Ainsworth on 3 September 2009, citing concerns over the war in Afghanistan. He served as Shadow Minister for Northern Ireland under Ed Miliband from June to November 2010.

Joyce was arrested five times during his last five years as an MP, most notably in February 2012 on suspicion of assault after an incident in the Houses of Parliament. This led to his immediate suspension from the Labour Party, before pleading guilty to all charges and resigning from the party the following month. He continued representing his constituency as an independent until retiring at the 2015 general election. On 7 July 2020, Joyce pleaded guilty at Ipswich Crown Court to making an indecent image of a child. On 7 August 2020, he was given a suspended prison sentence.

== Early life and education ==
Joyce lived in Perth, Scotland, with his family for most of his childhood and adolescence. He joined the Army in 1978, initially as a private in the Black Watch before taking a sabbatical between 1981 and 1987 to attend technical college and university where he gained a BA (Hons) in Religious Studies from Stirling University. As a university candidate, he was made a probationary second lieutenant on 25 August 1987.

In 1987 he attended the Royal Military Academy Sandhurst before being commissioned into the Royal Army Educational Corps (later Adjutant General's Corps) as a subaltern with seniority to 7 October 1981. After receiving his commission he continued his studies in-service and acquired an MA in education from the University of Bath and an MBA from Keele University. During his time in the Army he served in Great Britain, Northern Ireland, Germany and Central America. He was promoted to captain on 25 January 1990 and to major in 1992.

Joyce became involved in controversy after reportedly describing the Army "as being run by a coterie of white, male, privately-educated generals" and, according to BBC News Online, "said it was rife with racism and sexism." A Fabian pamphlet by Joyce titled Arms and the Man: renewing the armed services had been published without the proper authorisation, breaching Queen's Regulations, which govern the conduct of officers in the British armed forces. He continued to speak out about how he perceived the army to the disapproval of his superiors. At a hearing in January 1999, which invoked the Pay Warrant rules, Joyce was requested to resign from the army by 13 March or be discharged. He resigned his commission on 12 March 1999 and left the army,

Joyce subsequently served on the staff of the Commission for Racial Equality (Scotland) before his election to the House of Commons.

== Political career ==
He was first elected to parliament at the 2000 Falkirk West by-election, which was prompted by the resignation of Dennis Canavan. On election he served as a member of the Scottish Affairs and the Procedures Select Committees at Westminster. Joyce retained his seat in the 2001 general election, and was elected to the enlarged Falkirk constituency in the 2005 general election.

From 2003 Joyce served as a parliamentary private secretary (PPS) to a number of British Government ministers. He resigned as the Parliamentary Aide to Bob Ainsworth on 3 September 2009 citing concerns over the war in Afghanistan. He had previously been PPS to John Hutton during three of Hutton's cabinet posts: when he was the Secretary of State for Defence; Secretary of State for Business, Enterprise and Regulatory Reform and Secretary of State for Work and Pensions. Prior to that, Joyce served as the parliamentary aide to ministers Mike O'Brien MP, when O'Brien was the Minister for Energy at the Department of Trade and Industry and Margaret Hodge MP, Minister for Industry and the Regions at the Department of Trade and Industry.

Joyce persuaded the Treasury to change the child benefit regulations to remove a discrepancy that disadvantaged young Scottish FE students relative to their peers in the rest of the UK. In April 2008, Joyce became the first European parliamentarian to be granted an opportunity to address the newly formed Parliament of the Democratic Republic of the Congo, when he visited the DRC as the chair of the all-party parliamentary group on the Great Lakes Region of Africa with other members of the group. In September 2008, Joyce was criticised by local government councillors for describing the name of the new Clackmannanshire Bridge as "unimaginative" and "parochial". The naming of the bridge was reported as a contentious matter.

Joyce edited Now's the Hour!: new thinking for Holyrood and has served as Chair of the National Executive of the Fabian Society.

In September 2011, he contributed to the book What next for Labour? Ideas for a new Generation; his piece was entitled "It's a Sin".

=== Parliamentary record ===
Joyce most often put questions in the House of Commons to the Scotland Office, Department for International Development, Foreign and Commonwealth Office, Northern Ireland Office, and Ministry of Defence. While a parliamentary private secretary Joyce was expected to vote with the Government, but even when not, he never broke the Labour whip in Parliament. Joyce was not a member of any Parliamentary Select Committees at the end of his time in the Commons, but has been a member of several public bill committees.

=== Expenses claims ===
Joyce was the top-claiming Member of the House of Commons for the 2005–06 Parliamentary session, claiming £174,811 in expenses, of which 62% was for staff and office costs. After the 2005–06 Parliamentary session, he made a public pledge to cut his expenses; during the 2006–07 session, he moved down to 11th on the list of MPs' expenses and allowances, but again rose to the top for 2007–08, with £187,334. In October 2007, he claimed £180 for three oil paintings. When asked why he had used taxpayers' funds in such a way he replied "because they look nice."

== Criminal record ==
=== Drink driving ===
On 18 November 2010, he was arrested for failing to provide a breath test following a motoring incident in Falkirk. He pleaded guilty in court the following day and was fined £400 and banned from driving for a year. Joyce resigned from his position as Shadow Northern Ireland Minister and apologised for his behaviour.

=== Assault ===
On 22 February 2012 Joyce was arrested in the Palace of Westminster on suspicion of committing assault. He was reported to have attacked as many as six politicians, including a Labour whip, after having gone "berserk" following a dispute with a group of Tory MPs sitting nearby. He headbutted and punched the Conservative MP Stuart Andrew after striking Labour Assistant Whip Phil Wilson while Wilson was attempting to restrain him. He also headbutted Thurrock Conservative councillor Ben Maney and punched Basildon Conservative Councillor Luke Mackenzie, both of whom were attempting to break up the incident. Two more Conservative MPs, Alec Shelbrooke and Jackie Doyle-Price, were also caught up in the fracas while attempting to intervene and calm Joyce down. The disturbance occurred at the Strangers' Bar (reserved for MPs and their guests).

The following day, Joyce was suspended from the Labour Party. He pleaded guilty to four charges in relation to the incident, was fined £3,000 and ordered to pay £1,400 in compensation to his victims, but not given a custodial sentence. In a statement before the House of Commons on 12 March 2012, he apologised to his victims, stated that he had resigned from the Labour Party, and that he intended to complete his current term as an MP but not seek re-election. In August 2012, Joyce was fined £600 for removing the electronic tag that had been fitted to his leg as part of the community order.

A year later, on 14 March 2013, Joyce was again arrested after a disturbance during a karaoke event in the sports and social bar of the House of Commons. He was seen outside the bar wrestling on the floor with two police officers and reportedly had one of the officers in a headlock. He was not prosecuted.

On 17 October 2014, Joyce was arrested after clashing with a teenager at a store in Camden, in London. He was charged with two counts of common assault and one count of criminal damage. He appeared at Highbury Corner Magistrates' Court in London on 30 December 2014, where he pleaded not guilty and was given conditional bail to appear for trial. On 1 May 2015, he was found guilty on two counts of common assault in an appearance at Westminster Magistrates' Court in London. On 27 May 2015, he was sentenced to a 10-week jail term suspended for two years, and ordered to pay a £1,080 fine and to attend a rehabilitation course which aims to reduce violent behaviour.

=== Disturbance at Edinburgh Airport ===
On 19 May 2013, Joyce was arrested at Edinburgh Airport after police were called to an altercation between him and airline staff regarding a mislaid mobile phone. He was reported to have struggled with police officers before being restrained on the ground and handcuffed. On 21 March 2014, he pleaded guilty to a charge of breach of the peace at Edinburgh Sheriff Court and was fined £1,500 with £150 compensation.

=== Child sex offence ===
On 6 November 2018, Joyce was arrested and charged with having made an indecent image of a child. He had a 51-second Category-A film on his Apple Macbook Air that showed "the sexual abuse of very young children" between the ages of 12 months and 7 years. The video was accessed by Joyce between August 2013 and November 2018. He was given unconditional bail. On 7 July 2020, Joyce pleaded guilty at Ipswich Crown Court to making an indecent image of a child and was ordered to sign the sex offenders' register. On 7 August 2020, he was sentenced to eight months in prison, suspended for two years, and also ordered to perform 150 hours of community service.

== Personal life ==
Joyce is in a long-term relationship with the writer India Knight.

== See also ==
- 2013 Labour Party Falkirk candidate selection

Parliament of the United Kingdom
Preceded by Dennis Canavan	Member of Parliament for Falkirk West; 2000–2005	Abolished
New constituency	Member of Parliament for Falkirk; 2005–2015	Succeeded by John McNally
Party political offices
Preceded by Stephen Twigg	Chair of the Fabian Society; 2004 – 2005	Succeeded by Seema Malhotra
