= West Stirlingshire =

Parliamentary constituency in the United Kingdom, 1918–1983

- Former county constituency for the House of Commons
- Subdivision: Stirlingshire
- Major settlements: Bridge of Allan, Denny and Dunipace

1918–1983
- Seats: One
- Created from: Stirlingshire, Clackmannan & Kinross and Stirling Burghs
- Replaced by: Stirling, Falkirk West, Cumbernauld & Kilsyth, Clackmannan, Strathkelvin & Bearsden and Monklands West

West Stirlingshire was a county constituency of the House of Commons of the Parliament of the United Kingdom, to which it elected one Member of Parliament (MP) by the first past the post electoral system.

The constituency was created for the 1918 general election, as one of two divisions of the Parliamentary County of Stirling and Clackmannan. It was then defined as the Central and Western County Districts of the County of Stirling including all burghs within their boundaries, save for the Burgh of Stirling. From 1950 onwards, due to local government changes, it was defined as the Burghs of Bridge of Allan, Denny and Dunipace and the Central No. 1, Central No. 2, Western No. 1, Western No. 2 and Western No. 3 Districts of the County of Stirling.

The constituency was abolished for the 1983 general election.

== Members of Parliament ==
Election	Member	Party
1918	Harry Hope	Unionist Party
1922	Tom Johnston	Labour
1924	Guy Dalrymple Fanshawe	Unionist Party
1929	Tom Johnston	Labour
1931	James Campbell Ker	Unionist Party
1935	Tom Johnston	Labour
1945	Alfred Balfour	Labour
1959	William Baxter	Labour
Oct 1974	Dennis Canavan	Labour
1983	constituency abolished	

== Elections ==
=== Elections in the 1910s ===
General election 1918: West Stirlingshire
Party		Candidate	Votes	%	±%
C	Unionist	Harry Hope	6,893	51.9	
	Labour	Tom Johnston	3,809	28.7	
	Liberal	Robert Bontine Cunninghame Graham	2,582	19.4	
Majority			3,084	23.2	
Turnout			13,284	59.1	
	Unionist win (new seat)				
C indicates candidate endorsed by the coalition government.

=== Elections in the 1920s ===
General election 1922: West Stirlingshire
Party	Candidate	Votes	%	±%
Labour	Tom Johnston	8,919	52.4	+23.7
Unionist	Harry Hope	8,104	47.6	−4.3
Majority		815	4.8	N/A
Turnout		17,023	74.1	+15.0
Labour gain from Unionist		Swing	+14.0	

The Liberal nomination, William Wright, died the day after being nominated, so his name did not appear on the ballot.

General election 1923: West Stirlingshire
Party	Candidate	Votes	%	±%
Labour	Tom Johnston	9,242	51.9	−0.5
Unionist	Harry Hope	6,182	34.7	−12.9
Liberal	Robert Ian Aonas MacInnes	2,390	13.4	New
Majority		3,060	17.2	+12.4
Turnout		17,814	74.7	+0.6
Labour hold		Swing	+6.2	

General election 1924: West Stirlingshire
Party	Candidate	Votes	%	±%
Unionist	Guy Dalrymple Fanshawe	10,043	50.7	+16.0
Labour	Tom Johnston	9,749	49.3	−2.6
Majority		294	1.4	N/A
Turnout		19,792	81.0	+6.3
Unionist gain from Labour		Swing	+9.3	

General election 1929: West Stirlingshire
Party	Candidate	Votes	%	±%
Labour	Tom Johnston	15,179	56.7	+7.4
Unionist	Guy Dalrymple Fanshawe	11,589	43.3	−7.4
Majority		3,590	13.4	N/A
Turnout		26,768	82.7	+1.7
Labour gain from Unionist		Swing	+7.4	

=== Elections in the 1930s ===
General election 1931: West Stirlingshire
Party	Candidate	Votes	%	±%
Unionist	James Campbell Ker	14,771	53.3	+10.0
Labour	Tom Johnston	12,952	46.7	−10.0
Majority		1,819	6.6	N/A
Turnout		27,723	84.0	+1.3
Unionist gain from Labour		Swing	+10.0	

General election 1935: West Stirlingshire
Party	Candidate	Votes	%	±%
Labour	Tom Johnston	16,015	55.1	+8.4
Unionist	Arthur Paterson Duffes	13,053	44.9	−8.4
Majority		2,962	10.2	N/A
Turnout		29,068	82.3	−1.7
Labour gain from Unionist		Swing	+8.4	

General Election 1939–40

Another General Election was required to take place before the end of 1940. The political parties had been making preparations for an election to take place and by the Autumn of 1939, the following candidates had been selected;

- Labour: Alfred Balfour
- Conservative:

=== Elections in the 1940s ===
General election 1945: West Stirlingshire
Party	Candidate	Votes	%	±%
Labour	Alfred Balfour	16,066	54.4	−0.7
Unionist	J.C.L. Anderson	13,489	45.6	+0.7
Majority		2,577	8.8	−1.4
Turnout		29,555	75.0	−7.3
Labour hold		Swing	-0.7	

=== Elections in the 1950s ===
General election 1950: West Stirlingshire
Party	Candidate	Votes	%	±%
Labour	Alfred Balfour	19,930	55.63	+1.27
Unionist	Betty Harvie Anderson	15,894	44.37	−1.27
Majority		4,036	11.26	+2.54
Turnout		35,824	85.68	+10.50
Labour hold		Swing		

General election 1951: West Stirlingshire
Party	Candidate	Votes	%	±%
Labour	Alfred Balfour	20,893	56.03	+0.4
Unionist	Betty Harvie Anderson	16,396	43.97	−0.4
Majority		4,497	12.06	+0.80
Turnout		37,289	86.67	+0.99
Labour hold		Swing		

General election 1955: West Stirlingshire
Party	Candidate	Votes	%	±%
Labour	Alfred Balfour	18,836	54.59	−1.44
Unionist	W Allan Gay	15,669	45.41	+1.44
Majority		3,167	9.18	−2.88
Turnout		34,505	80.06	−6.61
Labour hold		Swing		

General election 1959: West Stirlingshire
Party	Candidate	Votes	%	±%
Labour	William Baxter	21,008	57.55	+2.96
Unionist	W Allan Gay	15,497	42.45	−2.96
Majority		5,511	15.10	+5.92
Turnout		36,505	83.56	+3.5
Labour hold		Swing		

=== Elections in the 1960s ===
General election 1964: West Stirlingshire
Party	Candidate	Votes	%	±%
Labour	William Baxter	21,144	58.77	+1.22
Unionist	John Barr	14,834	41.23	−1.22
Majority		6,310	17.54	+2.44
Turnout		35,978	81.19	−2.37
Labour hold		Swing		

General election 1966: West Stirlingshire
Party	Candidate	Votes	%	±%
Labour	William Baxter	17,513	48.59	−10.18
SNP	Robert McIntyre	9,381	26.03	New
Conservative	J. Donald M. Hardie	9,148	25.38	−15.85
Majority		8,132	22.56	+5.02
Turnout		36,042	82.42	+1.23
Labour hold		Swing		

=== Elections in the 1970s ===
General election 1970: West Stirlingshire
Party	Candidate	Votes	%	±%
Labour	William Baxter	18,884	48.89	+0.30
Conservative	John Glen	11,465	29.68	+4.30
SNP	Robert McIntyre	8,279	21.43	−4.60
Majority		7,419	19.21	−3.35
Turnout		38,628	78.94	−3.48
Labour hold		Swing		

General election February 1974: West Stirlingshire
Party	Candidate	Votes	%	±%
Labour	William Baxter	17,730	40.85	−8.04
SNP	Janette Jones	12,886	29.69	+8.26
Conservative	T. Price	12,789	29.46	−0.22
Majority		4,844	11.16	−8.05
Turnout		43,405	82.07	+3.13
Labour hold		Swing		

General election October 1974: West Stirlingshire
Party	Candidate	Votes	%	±%
Labour	Dennis Canavan	16,698	39.04	−1.81
SNP	Janette Jones	16,331	38.18	+8.49
Conservative	David Mitchell	7,875	18.41	−11.05
Liberal	Iain MacFarlane	1,865	4.36	New
Majority		367	0.86	−10.30
Turnout		42,769	80.71	−1.36
Labour hold		Swing		

General election 1979: West Stirlingshire
Party	Candidate	Votes	%	±%
Labour	Dennis Canavan	22,516	47.70	+8.66
Conservative	Anna McCurley	12,160	25.76	+7.35
SNP	Janette Jones	8,627	18.27	−19.91
Liberal	David Stewart Patrick Cant	3,905	8.27	+3.91
Majority		10,356	21.94	+21.08
Turnout		47,208	81.96	+1.25
Labour hold		Swing		

== Sources ==
- Craig, F. W. S. (1983) [1969]. British parliamentary election results 1918–1949 (3rd ed.). Chichester: Parliamentary Research Services. ISBN 0-900178-06-X.
- http://www.politicsresources.net
