= Falkirk West (UK Parliament constituency) =

UK Parliament constituency (1983–2005)

- Former county constituency for the House of Commons
- Boundary of Falkirk West in Scotland for the 2001 general election
- Subdivision: Falkirk

1983–2005
- Seats: One
- Created from: Stirling, Falkirk & Grangemouth, Stirlingshire East & Clackmannan and Stirlingshire West
- Replaced by: Falkirk

Falkirk West was a county constituency represented in the House of Commons of the Parliament of the United Kingdom from 1983 until 2005. Together with a portion of Falkirk East, it was replaced by Falkirk.

== Boundaries ==
1983–1997: The Falkirk District electoral divisions of Bonnybridge, Callendar, Carmuirs, Carronglen, Glenfuir, Grahamsdyke, Herbertshire, and Tryst.

1997–2005: The Falkirk District electoral divisions of Bainsford, Bonnybridge, Callendar, Carmuirs, Carronglen, Glenfuir, Grahamsdyke, Herbertshire, and Tryst.

== Members of Parliament ==
Election	Member	Party
1983	Dennis Canavan	Labour
1999	Dennis Canavan	Independent
2000 by-election	Eric Joyce	Labour
2005	constituency abolished: see Falkirk	

== Election results ==
=== Elections of the 1980s ===
General election 1983: Falkirk West
Party	Candidate	Votes	%	±%
Labour	Dennis Canavan	16,668	45.6	−4.5
Conservative	Iain Mitchell	7,690	21.0	+0.3
Liberal	Marshall Harris	7,477	20.4	New
SNP	Brian Cochrane	4,739	13.0	−16.2
Majority		8,978	24.6	
Turnout		36,574	74.0	
Labour win (new seat)				

General election 1987: Falkirk West
Party	Candidate	Votes	%	±%
Labour	Dennis Canavan	20,256	52.6	+7.0
Conservative	David Thomas	6,704	17.4	−3.6
SNP	Ian Goldie	6,696	17.4	+4.4
Liberal	Marshall Harris	4,841	12.6	−7.8
Majority		13,552	35.2	+10.6
Turnout		38,497	76.7	+2.7
Labour hold		Swing		

=== Elections of the 1990s ===
General election 1992: Falkirk West
Party	Candidate	Votes	%	±%
Labour	Dennis Canavan	19,162	49.8	−2.8
SNP	William Houston	9,350	24.3	+6.9
Conservative	Michael Macdonald	7,558	19.6	+2.2
Liberal Democrats	Martin Reilly	2,414	6.3	−6.3
Majority		9,812	25.5	−9.7
Turnout		38,484	76.8	+0.1
Labour hold		Swing		

General election 1997: Falkirk West
Party	Candidate	Votes	%	±%
Labour	Dennis Canavan	22,772	59.3	+9.6
SNP	David Alexander	8,989	23.4	−0.9
Conservative	Carol Buchanan	4,639	12.1	−7.6
Liberal Democrats	Derek Houston	1,970	5.1	−1.1
Majority		13,783	35.9	+10.4
Turnout		38,370	72.0	−4.8
Labour hold		Swing		

=== Elections of the 2000s ===
By-election 2000: Falkirk West
Party	Candidate	Votes	%	±%
Labour	Eric Joyce	8,492	43.5	−15.8
SNP	David Kerr	7,787	39.9	+16.5
Conservative	Craig Stevenson	1,621	8.3	−3.8
Scottish Socialist	Iain G. Hunter	989	5.1	New
Liberal Democrats	Hugh O'Donnell	615	3.1	−2.0
Majority		705	3.6	−32.3
Turnout		19,504	36.1	−36.9
Labour hold		Swing	-16.2	

General election 2001: Falkirk West
Party	Candidate	Votes	%	±%
Labour	Eric Joyce	16,022	51.9	−7.4
SNP	David Kerr	7,490	24.2	+0.8
Conservative	Simon Murray	2,321	7.5	−4.6
Liberal Democrats	Hugh O'Donnell	2,203	7.1	+2.0
Independent	Billy Buchanan	1,464	4.7	New
Scottish Socialist	Mhairi McAlpine	707	2.3	N/A
Independent	Hugh Lynch	490	1.6	New
Socialist Labour	Ronnie Forbes	194	0.6	New
Majority		8,532	27.7	−8.2
Turnout		30,891	57.1	−14.9
Labour hold		Swing		

== See also ==
- Falkirk West (Scottish Parliament constituency)
