= Tom Johnston (British politician) =

Scottish socialist and politician

The Right Honourable Thomas Johnston CH FRSE
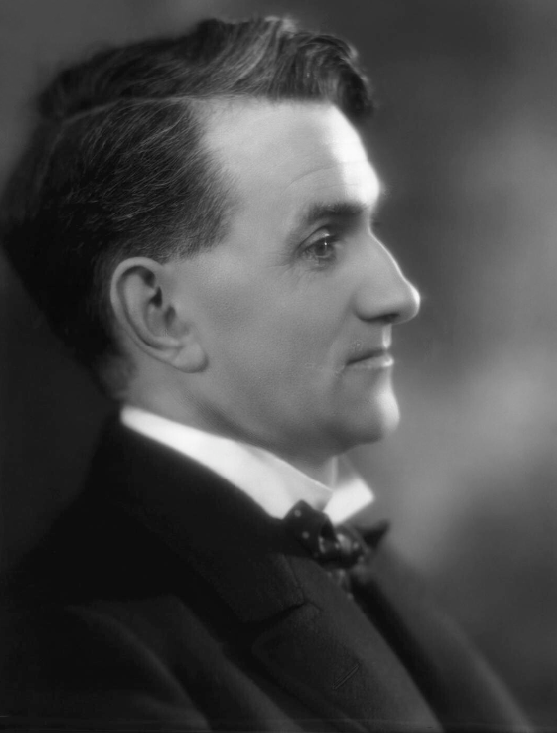
- Johnston

Secretary of State for Scotland
- In office 8 February 1941 – 23 May 1945
- Prime Minister: Winston Churchill
- Preceded by: Ernest Brown
- Succeeded by: The Earl of Rosebery

Lord Privy Seal
- In office 24 March 1931 – 24 August 1931
- Prime Minister: Ramsay MacDonald
- Preceded by: Vernon Hartshorn
- Succeeded by: The Earl Peel

Member of Parliament for West Stirlingshire
- In office 14 November 1935 – 15 June 1945
- Preceded by: James Campbell Ker
- Succeeded by: Alfred Balfour
- In office 30 May 1929 – 7 October 1931
- Preceded by: Guy Dalrymple Fanshawe
- Succeeded by: James Campbell Ker
- In office 15 November 1922 – 9 October 1924
- Preceded by: Harry Hope
- Succeeded by: Guy Dalrymple Fanshawe

Member of Parliament for Dundee
- In office 22 December 1924 – 10 May 1929

Personal details
- Born: 2 November 1881 Kirkintilloch, Dunbartonshire, Scotland
- Died: 5 September 1965 (aged 83) Milngavie, Dunbartonshire, Scotland
- Party: Labour
- Spouse: Margaret Freeland
- Children: 2
- Education: University of Glasgow
- Profession: Clerk, journalist

Thomas Johnston CH PC FRSE (2 November 1881 – 5 September 1965) was a prominent Scottish socialist journalist who became a politician of the early 20th century, a member of the Labour Party, a member of parliament (MP) and government minister – usually with Cabinet responsibility for Scottish affairs. He was also a notable figure in the Friendly society movement in Scotland.

== Red Clydesider ==
Johnston was the son of David Johnston, a grocer, and his wife, Mary Blackwood.

He was born in Kirkintilloch in 1881 and educated at Kirkintilloch Board School then at Lenzie Academy. Studying Moral Philosophy and Political Economy at the University of Glasgow, he failed to graduate, but helped launch the left-wing journal, Forward, in 1906, and in the same city later became associated with the 'Red Clydesiders', a socialist grouping that included James Maxton and Manny Shinwell. In 1909 he published a book, Our Scots Noble Families, which aimed to discredit the landed aristocracy.

First elected as a Member of Parliament (MP) for the constituency of Stirling and Clackmannan West in November 1922 general election, Johnston lost his seat at the October 1924 general election. He quickly returned to Parliament, winning the Dundee by-election in December.

He was re-elected for Stirling and Clackmannan Western at the 1929 general election, when he was appointed Under-Secretary of State for Scotland by Prime Minister Ramsay MacDonald. This troubled administration was relatively short-lived; only a handful of Labour ministers supported MacDonald's proposal of a coalition government, with Johnston and other Red Clydesiders among the strong opponents. Long a member of the Independent Labour Party, he opposed its disaffiliation from the Labour Party. He lost his seat at the 1931 general election, and failed to be returned at a by-election in Dunbartonshire in 1932, but he joined the new Scottish Socialist Party, which affiliated to Labour, and he returned (representing Stirling and Clackmannan West) to the House of Commons at the 1935 general election and remained an MP until retiring in the 1945 general election.

Johnston was the key government figure involved in the evacuation of St Kilda, Scotland in 1930. Documents relating to this event, which attracted considerable press attention, are available to view in the National Archives of Scotland.

== The City of Glasgow Friendly Society (now Scottish Friendly) ==
On 17 October 1912, Tom Johnston was welcomed to the board of the City of Glasgow Friendly Society (now Scottish Friendly). John Stewart had established the society as a breakaway movement from the Royal Liver Friendly Society some 50 years previously, with the intention of providing a "safe and sound means of investment for the working classes."

Johnston was appointed vice-president of the society in 1919. On his appointment as Member of Parliament in 1922, he was warmly congratulated by the society's board. When many coal miners were unable to pay their premiums during the 1926 British general strike, the society remained supportive, in line with its founding principles; according to Johnston:

"The City of Glasgow Friendly Society had a reputation for humane dealings with its members. We really did try to live up to the word 'Friendly'. So when the miners couldn’t pay their premiums, we helped them instead of lapsing them. We were possibly the only office not to lapse a miner during those strikes."

On 10 October 1932, almost 20 years after joining the board, Johnston was appointed deputy and successor to James Stewart, the son of the society's original founder. A brochure printed to mark the society's 70th birthday indicated the high regard with which Johnston was held:

"The task that faced the Board in making this appointment was no light one. To preserve the continuity of success and management it was essential to secure a man, not only intellectually capable, but who was also imbued with the ideals of the Society. The long association of Mr. Johnston with the Society as a Delegate and a Member of the Board, and his outstanding qualities which have made him so prominent a figure in the public life of this country, singles him out as the one person to assist the general manager and ultimately to fill as adequately as it is possible the office of general manager. This choice was the unanimous one of the Board."

Though an active politician and MP, Johnston devoted considerable time to the society, and proposed novel ideas about life assurance. In December 1933, he addressed the Glasgow and West of Scotland Faculty of Insurance, where he introduced the idea of an all-in social insurance scheme, covering unemployment, health and pensions. In effect, the society played a role in shaping the life assurance movement and what is now known as the Welfare State.

The following year, in 1934, James Stewart retired as general manager of the society and Johnston took over. With the society facing ever-rising administration costs as many of their members relocated to England in search of work, Johnston worked out proposals for co-operation between the collecting societies, proposing a sub-committee be formed. Despite opposition, in October 1934, Johnston was elected to the executive of the Association of Collecting Friendly Societies. He went on pressing for his sub-committee until 1938 when, in view of the reluctance of some of the larger societies to participate, he decided that no useful purpose would be served by proceeding with it.

One of the big changes that occurred during Johnston's management was the improvement of Society staff conditions. It was the first of its group to give the staff alternative Saturdays off, and it introduced a special bonus system. On several occasions the board proposed salary increases for the general manager, but on each occasion Johnston refused. In March 1938, for example, the board proposed to increase his salary by £500 a year. As Johnston knew there would have to be economies among the lower tiers of staff, he refused the increase.

In 1941, Tom Johnson was appointed wartime Secretary of State for Scotland by Prime Minister Winston Churchill but continued to work for the society and the principles for which it stood.

When Sir William Beveridge was asked to make a report on industrial assurance, Tom Johnston came back to the campaign he had been waging among the members of the Association of Collecting Friendly Societies. The report Social Insurance and Allied Services (known as the Beveridge Report) served as the basis for the post-World War II British welfare state put in place by the Labour government elected in 1945.

Responding to the Beveridge Report, a letter to the Association of Collecting Friendly Societies from David White, the interim general manager of the society, reiterated the need to remove some of the unnecessary costs of Industrial Assurance:

"My Board does not believe it possible or desirable to defend a system of collection which involves 20 or 30 offices collecting in almost every street in the land: in thousands upon thousands of instances two or three offices sending or permitting agents to collect in the same houses, and in extreme cases the same Society sending or permitting two of its agents to collect in the same houses."

The letter goes on to remind the Association of the attempts by Tom Johnston to get a sub-committee appointed.

In 1946, after 34 years’ active service, Johnston retired as the society's general manager. But he did not give up his connection and continued as a director of the trustee company, which held the society's investments.

== Wartime roles ==
In April 1939, during the build-up to the Second World War, John Anderson, the Home Secretary, appointed Johnston as Commissioner for Civil Defence in Scotland. In this role, Johnston oversaw preparations for aerial bombardment and possible invasion, and the organisation of shelter and relief work. Prime Minister Winston Churchill appointed Johnston as Secretary of State for Scotland on 12 February 1941, and Johnston retained the post until May 1945. As Devine (1999) concludes, "Johnston was a giant figure in Scottish politics and is revered to this day as the greatest Scottish Secretary of the century....In essence, Johnston was promised the powers of a benign dictator.".

Johnston launched numerous initiatives to promote Scotland. Opposed to the excessive concentration of industry in the English Midlands, he attracted 700 businesses and 90,000 new jobs through his new Scottish Council of Industry. He set up 32 committees to deal with any number of social and economic problems, ranging from juvenile delinquency to sheep farming. He regulated rents, and set up a prototype national health service (see Emergency Hospital Service), using new hospitals set up in the expectation of large numbers of casualties from German bombing. His most successful venture was setting up a system of hydroelectricity using water power in the Scottish Highlands.

A long-standing supporter of the Home Rule movement, he was able to persuade Churchill of the need to counter the Scottish nationalist threat north of the border and created a Scottish Council of State and a Council of Industry as institutions to devolve some power away from Whitehall.

== Post-war activity ==
He withdrew from politics in 1945 to run the Hydro Board. Johnston subsequently served as chairman of various Scottish organisations, including the Scottish Tourist Board, the Scottish National Forestry Commission (1945–48) and the North of Scotland Hydro-Electric Board (1946–59). He represented Scottish interests in the council appointed to devise the 1951 Festival of Britain. In 1948 he was awarded the Freedom of the City of Aberdeen. He was also Chancellor of Aberdeen University from 1951 until his death in 1965.

== Power to the Glens ==
Undoubtedly his greatest legacy was the creation of the North of Scotland Hydro-Electric Board.

Until the 1940s, many rural areas of Scotland outwith the Central Belt had little or no electricity supply. There were coal-fired steam-turbine and some diesel-driven power stations serving urban locations, and excess capacity from a few large industrial hydroelectricity stations (e.g. those serving the aluminium smelters at Foyers and Kinlochleven) was made available locally, but there was no widespread distribution of electricity through a comprehensively integrated electric power transmission system such as the present National Grid.

Possibly inspired by the earlier example of the American Tennessee Valley Authority initiative of the New Deal administration of President Franklin D Roosevelt, addressing the very strong popular sentiment of the immediate post-war period for a more equitable distribution of the resources and benefits of a modern economy, Johnston worked to win over all interested parties, including generally reluctant landowners, to the goal of harnessing the (then) scarcely developed but naturally well-suited geography and climate of the Scottish Highlands to the generation of electricity by water power. In the three decades following the Second World War, the Hydro Board's teams of planners, engineers, architects and labourers succeeded in creating more means of electricity generation and distribution schemes that were world-renowned not only for successfully achieving their technical aims in very demanding terrain but for often doing so in an aesthetically inspiring manner. The economic and social benefits thus brought to all the people of Scotland, and especially those in rural areas, were immense and long-lasting.

== Private life ==
In 1920 he published the History of the Working Classes in Scotland.

He married Margaret F. Cochrane (d.1977) in 1914 and they were married for over 50 years.

From 1950 to 1952 he served as President of the Scottish History Society.

He died in Milngavie on 5 September 1965.

== Bibliography ==
- Galbraith, Russell (1995), Without Quarter: A Biography of Tom Johnston, Birlinn, ISBN 978-1-78027-471-3
- Hansard 1803–2005: contributions in Parliament by Tom Johnston
- Harvie, Christopher (1981), Labour and Scottish Government: The Age of Tom Johnston, in The Bulletin of Scottish Politics No. 2, Spring 1981, pp. 1 – 20
- Douds, Gerard. "Tom Johnston in India," Journal of the Scottish Labour History Society, 1984, Issue 19, pp 6–21,
- House, Jack; Laing, Allan (2012). "The Friendly Adventure: The Story of Scottish Friendly Assurance Society's One Hundred and Fifty Years" (PDF). Archived from the original (PDF) on 26 May 2012.
- Miller, James (2003). The Dam Builders: Power from the Glens. Birlinn. ISBN 978-1-84158-225-2.
- Pottinger, George (1979), The Secretaries of State for Scotland 1926-76, Scottish Academic Press, Edinburgh, pp. 87 – 99
- Torrance, David The Scottish Secretaries (Birlinn 2006)
- Walker, Graham. "Johnston, Thomas (1881–1965)", Oxford Dictionary of National Biography, Oxford University Press, 2004; online edn, May 2006 accessed 19 Dec 2010
- Walker, Graham. Thomas Johnston (1988), scholarly biography

=== Primary sources ===
- Johnston, Tom. Memories (1952)

Parliament of the United Kingdom
Preceded by Harry Hope	Member of Parliament for West Stirlingshire; 1922–1924	Succeeded by Guy Dalrymple Fanshawe
Preceded by Edwin Scrymgeour and E. D. Morel	Member of Parliament for Dundee; 1924–1929; With: Edwin Scrymgeour	Succeeded by Edwin Scrymgeour and Michael Marcus
Preceded by Guy Dalrymple Fanshawe	Member of Parliament for West Stirlingshire; 1929–1931	Succeeded by James Campbell Ker
Preceded by James Campbell Ker	Member of Parliament for West Stirlingshire; 1935–1945	Succeeded by Alfred Balfour (for West Stirlingshire)
Political offices
Preceded by Walter Elliot	Under-Secretary of State for Scotland; 1929–1931	Succeeded by Joseph Westwood
Preceded by Vernon Hartshorn	Lord Privy Seal; 1931	Succeeded by The Earl Peel
Preceded by Ernest Brown	Secretary of State for Scotland; 1941–1945	Succeeded by The Earl of Rosebery
Party political offices
Preceded by James Maxton	Scottish Division representative on the Independent Labour Party National Administrative Council; 1916–1918	Succeeded by J. B. Houston
Media offices
Preceded by New position	Editor of Forward; 1906–1931	Succeeded by Emrys Hughes
Academic offices
Preceded by Field Marshal Earl Wavell	Chancellor of the University of Aberdeen; 1951–1965	Succeeded by The Lord Polwarth
