= Dennis Canavan =

Scottish politician (born 1942)

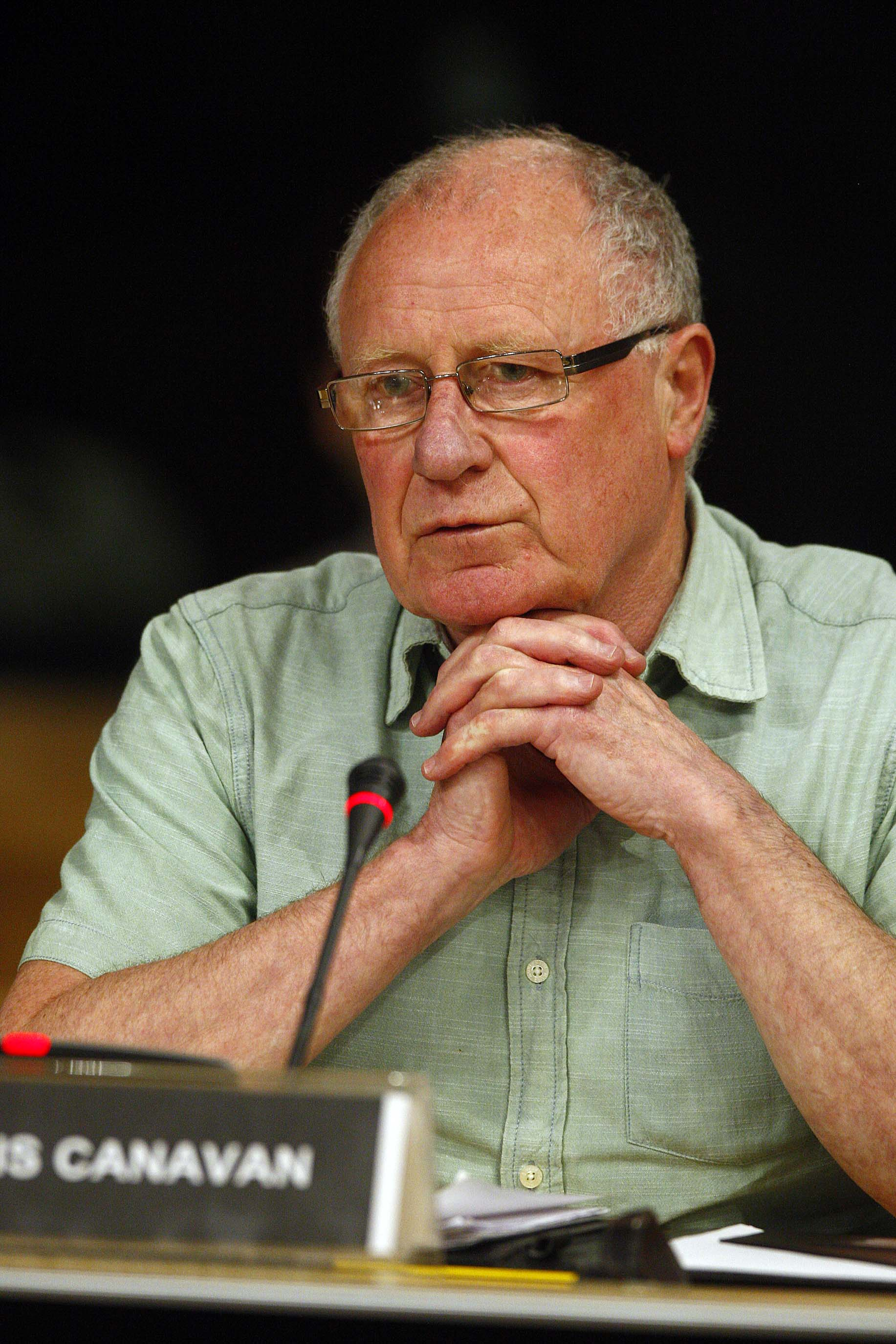

Member of the Scottish Parliament for Falkirk West
- In office 6 May 1999 – 2 April 2007
- Preceded by: Constituency established
- Succeeded by: Michael Matheson

Member of Parliament for Falkirk West West Stirlingshire (Oct 1974–1983)
- In office 10 October 1974 – 21 November 2000
- Preceded by: William Baxter
- Succeeded by: Eric Joyce

Personal details
- Born: Dennis Andrew Canavan; 8 August 1942 (age 84) Cowdenbeath, Scotland
- Party: Independent (1999–present)
- Other political affiliations: Labour (1974–1999)
- Education: University of Edinburgh

Dennis Andrew Canavan (born 8 August 1942) is a Scottish politician. He was the Member of Parliament for Falkirk West from 1974 to 2000 (known as West Stirlingshire from 1974 to 1983), first as a member of the Labour Party, and then as an independent. He then served as an independent member of the Scottish Parliament (MSP) for Falkirk West from 1999 to 2007.

In 2014, he was the chair of the advisory board of Yes Scotland, the campaign for independence in the 2014 Scottish independence referendum.

== Early life ==
Born in Cowdenbeath, Canavan was educated at St. Bride's and St. Columba's Schools, Cowdenbeath, St Andrew's College, Drygrange, and at the University of Edinburgh. He worked as a schoolteacher from 1968 until 1974 and was Assistant Head of Holy Rood High School Edinburgh at the time of his first election to Parliament. Canavan was also head of the maths department at St Modans High in Stirling.

== Career ==
=== Westminster (1974–2000) ===
He was leader of the Labour Party Group on Stirling District Council in 1974 and, in October of that year, was elected as Labour Member of Parliament (MP) for West Stirlingshire. Following boundary changes, he was MP for Falkirk West from 1983 to 2000. He was Chair of the Scottish Parliamentary Labour Group from 1980 to 1981. In 1975, he tried introducing a bill to abolish corporal punishment in schools and his efforts formed part of the case presented to the European Commission of Human Rights which led eventually to abolition. He voted against the Blair Government's proposals to cut benefits for children of lone parents, abolish student grants and introduce tuition fees.

A keen sports enthusiast, he was founder and Convener of the Scottish Sports Group at Westminster and the Cross-Party Sports Group in the Scottish Parliament. He has completed a marathon in less than three hours and the Ben Nevis Race in just over two hours. He won a gold medal, playing for Scotland in the British Universities Football Championships in 1967. In his book The Final Whistle?, Harry Reid claims that Canavan took part in the 1977 Wembley pitch invasion after Scotland beat England and ripped up a patch of the turf.

He takes an active interest in international affairs and served as a member of the House of Commons select committees on Foreign Affairs and International Development. He is still a member of the Campaign for Nuclear Disarmament and Amnesty International and is interested in conflict resolution.

He chaired the Northern Ireland Committee of the Parliamentary Labour Party from 1989 to 1997, and led several parliamentary delegations to Ireland during The Troubles. He served on the British-Irish Inter-Parliamentary Body from 1992 to 2000. As a member of the European and External Relations Committee of the Scottish Parliament, he was author of a report on the potential for co-operation between Scotland and Ireland. He has frequently spoken out against sectarianism and racism.

=== Scottish Parliament (1999–2007) ===
Throughout his political life, Canavan played a leading part in the campaign for a Scottish Parliament. When Labour was in opposition under James Callaghan, Michael Foot, Neil Kinnock, John Smith and Tony Blair, he led a nationwide consultation about devolution, on behalf of the Scottish Group of Labour MPs, leading to the publication of a bill to establish a Scottish Parliament with revenue-raising powers. However, in 1999, when the first elections to the Scottish Parliament were held, the New Labour leadership rejected him as an official Labour candidate, despite the fact that he had the support of 97% of local party members. He therefore stood as an independent, and was consequently expelled from the party. Although there were rumours he would join the Scottish National Party, he did not join another party. He won with almost 55 percent of the vote, the highest majority of any MSP in the 1999 election. He resigned his Westminster seat in 2000 to concentrate on representing his constituents in the Scottish Parliament. Canavan retained his Holyrood seat in 2003 with 55.7 percent of the vote, again with the biggest majority in Scotland.

In the Scottish Parliament, he was a member of the European and External Relations Committee and Convener of the All-Party Sports Group from 1999. In 2003 he criticised the Scottish football authorities when Falkirk Football Club was refused promotion to the Scottish Premier League, despite having won the First Division Championship. He supported Falkirk's efforts to build a new stadium for community use and he still regularly attends the club's matches. He is also Honorary President of Milton Amateurs Football Club.

Canavan enjoys hill-walking and, in the Scottish Parliament, he championed the people's right of access to the countryside, successfully introducing amendments to the Land Reform (Scotland) Bill to extend the right of access to country estates, including land belonging to the Queen. He is a former President and now Vice-President of Ramblers Scotland.

He is a strong supporter of the idea of a national holiday to celebrate St Andrew's Day, and his bill to achieve this was eventually passed as the St. Andrew's Day Bank Holiday (Scotland) Act 2007.

== Retirement from politics ==
When he announced his retirement before the 2007 Scottish Parliament elections, he was the longest serving parliamentarian in the Scottish Parliament, having completed a combined 33 years at Westminster and Holyrood. After this announcement he received an ovation in the Chamber of the Scottish Parliament from other MSPs and was praised by the First Minister Jack McConnell as "an outstanding parliamentarian over a long, long period of time".

In April 2010, Canavan declared his support for John McNally, the Scottish National Party candidate for Falkirk in the 2010 general election. Falkirk is the successor to Canavan's former Westminster constituency.

== After politics ==
Canavanis a member of the board of trustees of the National Mining Museum Scotland. He is Patron of Falkirk and District Association for Mental Health and Patron of Bonnybridge Driving Force, a charity involved with the organisation of volunteer drivers transporting patients to and from hospital.

In 2018, the Scottish Government commissioned an independent review into the impact of policing on communities during the miners strike and Canvan was appointed a member of the advisory panel which led to a pardon being granted to most of the miners and their family members who were convicted during the strike.

== Honours and awards ==
He has honorary doctorates from the Universities of Stirling and Strathclyde.

In recognition of his public service, Falkirk Council launched the Dennis Canavan Scholarship to encourage young people to go on to further or higher education and to use their talents to help others.

== Personal life ==
Canavan's marriage to Elnor Canavan ended in divorce. They had four children, all of whom predeceased him; he also has a son with his partner.

He is a republican.

== Autobiography ==
His autobiography, Let the People Decide, was published by Birlinn in September 2009. (ISBN 978-1-84158839-1)

Parliament of the United Kingdom
Preceded by William Baxter	Member of Parliament for West Stirlingshire; 1974–1983	Constituency abolished
New constituency	Member of Parliament for Falkirk West; 1983–2000	Succeeded by Eric Joyce
Scottish Parliament
New constituency	Member of the Scottish Parliament for Falkirk West; 1999–2007	Succeeded by Michael Matheson
