= Henry Hepburne-Scott, 10th Lord Polwarth =

The Right Honourable The Lord Polwarth TD DL

Chancellor of the University of Aberdeen
- In office 1966–1986
- Preceded by: Rt Hon. Thomas Johnston
- Succeeded by: Sir Kenneth Alexander

Minister of State for Scotland
- In office 7 April 1972 – 7 March 1974
- Prime Minister: Edward Heath
- Preceded by: The Lady Tweedsmuir
- Succeeded by: Bruce Millan

Personal details
- Born: 17 November 1916 Edinburgh, Scotland
- Died: 4 January 2005 (aged 88)
- Party: Scottish Conservative
- Spouses: Jean Cunninghame Graham (m. 1969) Caroline Margaret (m. 1943; div. 1969)
- Children: One son and three daughters
- Education: Eton College, King's College, Cambridge
- Profession: Chartered accountant, businessman and Conservative politician

Henry Alexander Hepburne-Scott, 10th Lord Polwarth TD DL (17 November 1916 – 4 January 2005) was a Scottish chartered accountant, businessman and Conservative politician.

Polwarth was the eldest son of the Hon. Walter Thomas Hepburne-Scott, Master of Polwarth, son of Walter George Hepburne-Scott, 9th Lord Polwarth. His paternal grandmother Edith Frances was the daughter of Sir Thomas Buxton, 3rd Baronet, and the great-granddaughter of the social reformer Sir Thomas Buxton, 1st Baronet. He was educated at Eton and King's College, Cambridge, and served in the Second World War as a Captain in the Lothians and Border Horse and as an Aide-de-Camp to Major-General Percy Hobart and to Major-General Brian Horrocks. In 1944 he succeeded his grandfather in the lordship, his father having died in 1942 from an illness contracted during the Second World War. In 1945 he was elected a Scottish representative peer.

Polwarth was a partner in the firm of Cheine & Tait, chartered accountants, from 1950 to 1968, a Director of Imperial Chemical Industries from 1969 to 1972 and Chairman of the Scottish Council for Development and Industry from 1956 to 1966 and its President from 1966 to 1972. In 1968 he was appointed Chairman of the General Accident Insurance Group, a post he held until 1972. He was also a Director of the Bank of Scotland between 1950 and 1971 and 1974 and 1981 and served as its Governor between 1968 and 1972. In 1972 he was made Minister of State for Scotland in the Conservative administration headed by Edward Heath, a post he held until the Conservatives lost power in 1974. Polwarth then returned to business and was again a Director of Imperial Chemical Industries from 1974 to 1981 and also of the Sun Life Assurance Co of Canada from 1975 to 1984, of the Canadian Pacific Railway from 1975 to 1986 and of Halliburton Co from 1974 to 1987. From 1984 to 1985 he was a member of the House of Lords Select Committee on Overseas Trade but lost his seat in the House of Lords after the passing of the House of Lords Act 1999. Apart from his career in industry and politics he was Chancellor of the University of Aberdeen from 1966 to 1986.

Lord Polwarth received an Honorary Doctorate from Heriot-Watt University in 1968.

Lord Polwarth married firstly Caroline Margaret, daughter of Captain Robert Athole Hay, in 1943. They had one son and three daughters but were divorced in 1969 (she died in 1982). He married secondly Jean, daughter of Admiral Sir Angus Edward Malise Bontine Cunninghame Graham of Gartmore and of Ardoch, and former wife of Charles Jauncey, in 1969. Polwarth died in January 2005, aged 88, and was succeeded by his only son Andrew.

== Notes ==
Political offices
Preceded by The Lady Tweedsmuir	Minister of State for Scotland; 1972–1974	Succeeded by Bruce Millan
Academic offices
Preceded by Rt Hon. Thomas Johnston	Chancellor of the University of Aberdeen; 1966–1986	Succeeded by Sir Kenneth Alexander
Peerage of Scotland
Preceded by Walter George Hepburne-Scott	Lord Polwarth; 1944–2005	Succeeded by Andrew Walter Hepburne-Scott
