= Woodilee Village =

Coordinates: 55.928°N 4.133°W

- Location within East Dunbartonshire
- OS grid reference: NS6672
- Council area: East Dunbartonshire
- Lieutenancy area: Dunbartonshire
- Country: Scotland
- Sovereign state: United Kingdom
- Post town: GLASGOW
- Postcode district: G66
- Dialling code: 0141
- Police: Scotland
- Fire: Scottish
- Ambulance: Scottish
- UK Parliament: East Dunbartonshire Cumbernauld, Kilsyth and Kirkintilloch East
- Scottish Parliament: Strathkelvin and Bearsden

Woodilee Village is an enlargement to the town of Lenzie in the Kirkintilloch area. The local authority is East Dunbartonshire.

== Background ==
The area is built on the site of Woodilee Hospital, Lenzie, which was once the largest psychiatric hospital in Scotland. Building work began in the late 2000s. In 2010 the first properties went on sale and in 2011 the first residents moved in. The site is almost complete now but building continues in nearby areas e.g. close to Waterside and Fauldhead.

Stoneyetts Drive shares its name with the now-defunct Stoneyetts Hospital, which was linked with Woodilee and Gartloch hospitals under the Board of Management for Glasgow North Eastern Mental Hospitals.

== Schools ==
All houses and apartments, including the clock tower, to the south of the main Woodilee Village road, are zoned to Lenzie Primary and Lenzie Academy. No part of the estate is zoned to Lenzie Moss Primary. Houses to the north of the main Woodilee village road are zoned to Kirkintilloch schools, including Kirkintilloch High School and some of its associated primary schools. This has resulted in an increase in placing requests from parents wishing their children to attend the school of their choice.
