= Auchinloch =

Village in North Lanarkshire, Scotland

Coordinates: 55.909°N 4.148°W

Auchinloch: Scottish Gaelic: Achadh an Loch
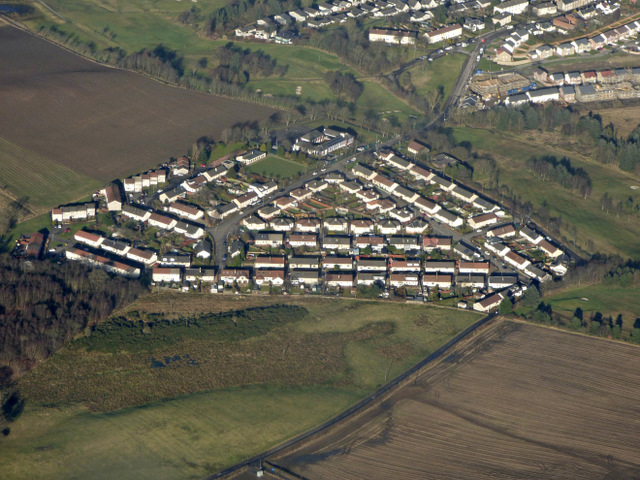
- Wester Auchinloch from the air, 2018

- Location within North Lanarkshire Auchinloch (North Lanarkshire)
- Population: 880 (2020)
- OS grid reference: NS657447
- Council area: North Lanarkshire
- Lieutenancy area: Lanarkshire
- Country: Scotland
- Sovereign state: United Kingdom
- Post town: GLASGOW
- Postcode district: G66 5
- Dialling code: 0141
- Police: Scotland
- Fire: Scottish
- Ambulance: Scottish

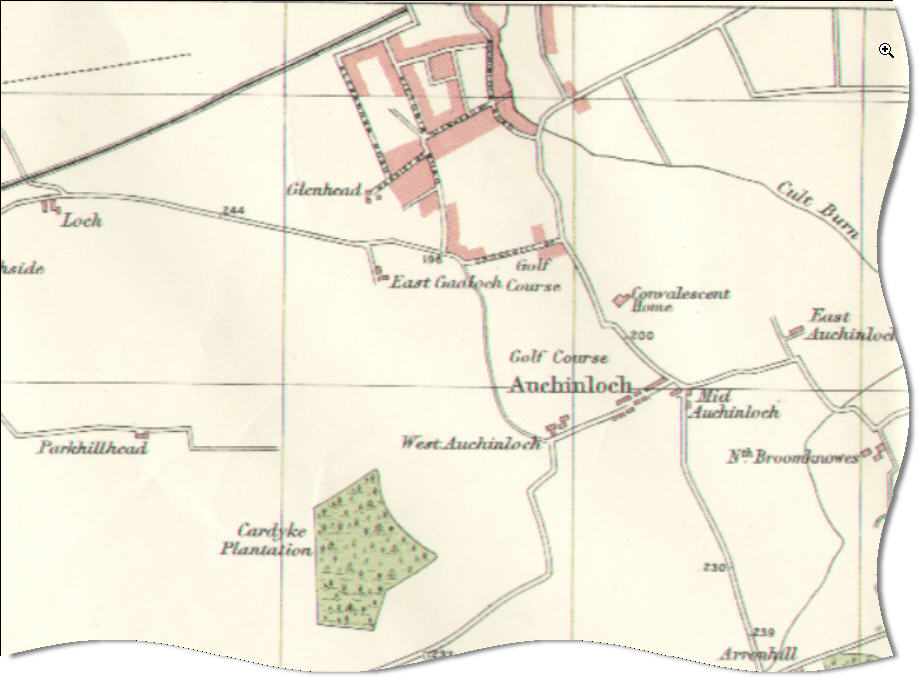
Map of Auchinloch, published in 1923

Auchinloch (Scottish Gaelic: Achadh an Loch) is a village in Scotland, situated within the North Lanarkshire local authority area but very close to the boundary with East Dunbartonshire and sharing the G66 postcode of the town of Kirkintilloch and the adjoining village of Lenzie, located a short distance to the north. Other nearby settlements in North Lanarkshire are Stepps to the south and Chryston to the south-east, each approximately 1.3 miles (2.1 km) away across farmland and on the opposite side of the M80 motorway; the Glasgow City council area boundary and the suburb of Robroyston is about the same distance to the west. In previous years Auchinloch was in the Parish of Cadder and, from 1975 until 1996, the district of Strathkelvin within Strathclyde Region.

The village's name - "Field of the Loch" - derives from its proximity to a small loch called the Gadloch. The area was sometimes known as the Loch Lands.

== History ==
The etymology of the name is 'Field of the loch' (achadh an locha). Several old documents show Auchinloch with various spellings including maps by Timothy Pont, Charles Ross, and William Roy. There is some evidence that the religious revivals of the 18th century touched the village. The housing used to consist mainly of two parallel rows of single-storied weavers' cottages. One gazetteer, Samuel Lewis, describes coal being hardly worth digging with some limestone quarrying with a works established at Garnkirk. He quotes 138 inhabitants. Around 1860, there were 126 inhabitants. There was also a convalescent home at Auchinloch; in 1864 it had 64 places for residents. Industrialisation came in the 1880s, with the opening of the Lumloch colliery, and then in the 1920s Wester Auchengeich near to the older Lumloch Colliery and Auchengeich Colliery near Moodiesburn. Wester Auchengeich closed in 1968.

Outside modern Auchinloch near Auchinleck Farm is the Wallace Well, sited almost exactly on the boundary between Glasgow and North Lanarkshire. This used to be called Auchinloch Well, was common to all farmers, and is mentioned in the New Statistical Account.

== The village ==
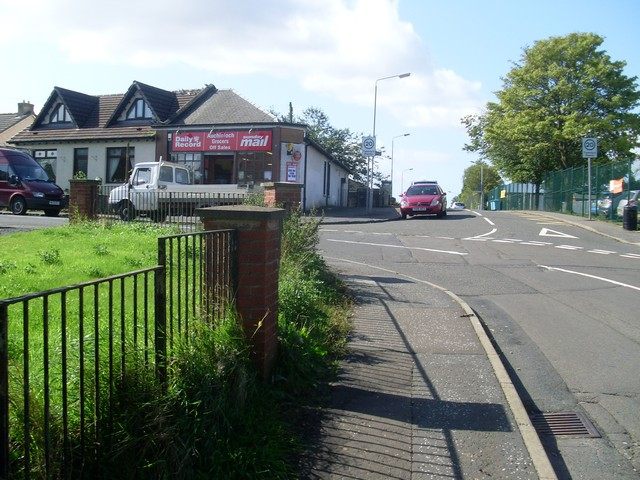
Auchinloch newsagents

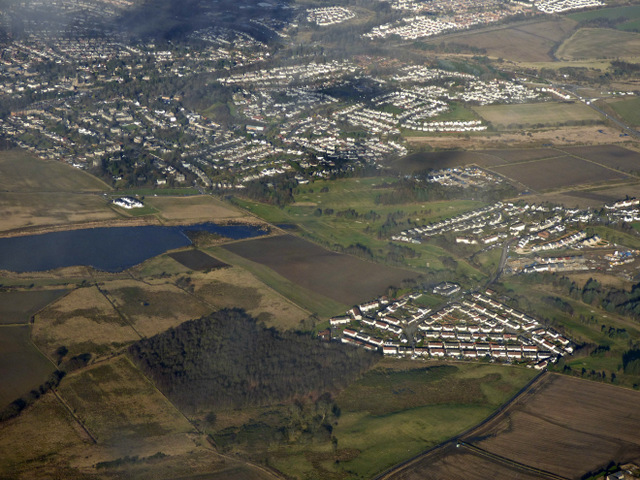
Auchinloch and Gadloch from the air, with Lenzie beyond

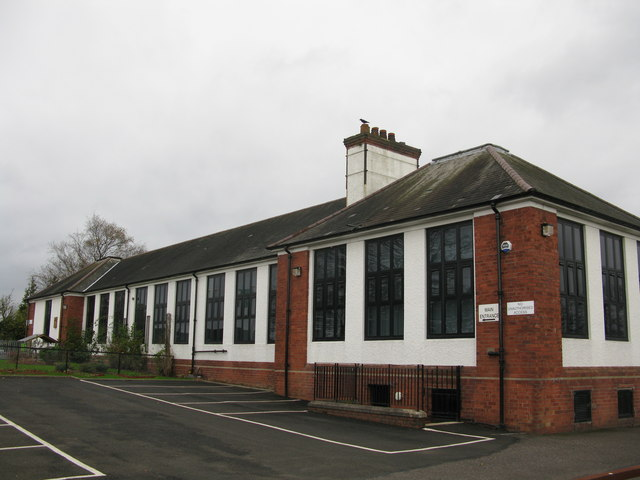
Auchinloch Primary School

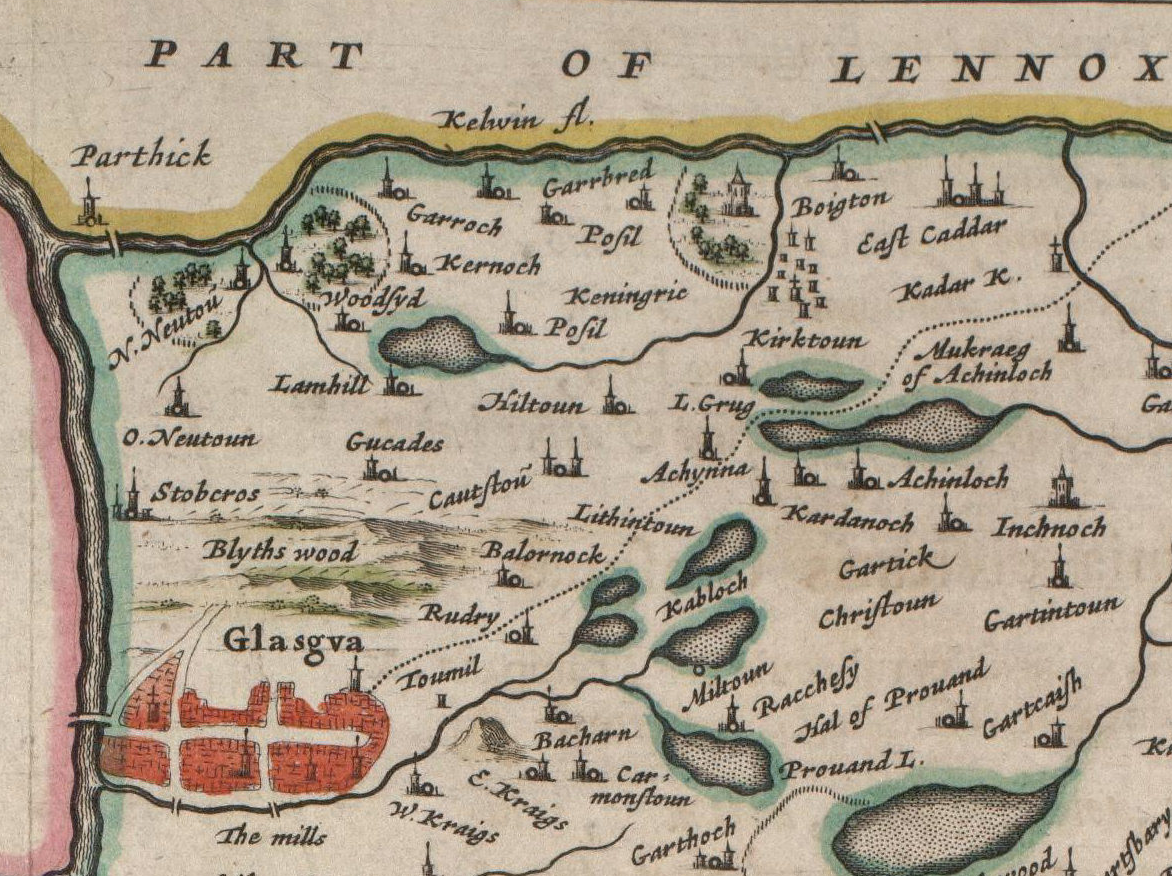
Blaeu's Map (1654) showing the area around Auchinloch eastwards of Glasgow

The newer western part of the village (sometimes known as 'Wester Auchinloch', while the older part at Stepps Road is prefixed with 'Easter') includes Auchinloch Primary School. The present building dates to the 1930s, whilst the original 19th-century building still remains to the east and now serves as the village hall/community centre. Auchinloch Community Centre lies at the top of the village near the local pub. There is also a Bowling Green in the village, a local newsagents where the shopkeeper was murdered in 1999 and Cardyke Farm Shelter, a branch of the Cats Protection Society, a short distance to the west. The village is in the catchment area for Lenzie Academy.

== See also ==
- Alex Moffat (trade unionist)
- List of places in North Lanarkshire
