= Woodilee =

Woodilee may refer to:

- Woodilee Hospital, psychiatric institution in Lenzie, East Dunbartonshire, Scotland
- Woodilee Village, village in East Dunbartonshire. Scotland
