= Bedlay Castle =

Former defensive castle, dating from the late 16th and 17th centuries

Coordinates: 55.90528°N 4.09381°W

- Interactive map of the Bedlay Castle area

General information
- Location: North Lanarkshire, Between Chryston and Moodiesburn, Scotland
- Completed: Around 1580

Bedlay Castle is a former defensive castle, dating from the late 16th and 17th centuries. It is located between Chryston and Moodiesburn in North Lanarkshire, Scotland. The castle is just off the A80 road, around 8 miles to the north-east of Glasgow, at NS692700. This castle has several ghostlore stories associated with it.

== History ==
The lands of Bedlay or Ballayn were possession of the Bishops of Glasgow. The grant of land to the diocese was confirmed by David I and again by William I in 1180. Bishop Cameron is reported to have had a castle or house on this site.

In 1580, James Boyd of Trochrig, then the titular Protestant Archbishop of Glasgow, granted the lands to his kinsman, Robert Boyd, 4th Lord Boyd of Kilmarnock. He built the original Bedlay Castle soon after, on the end of a volcanic crag above the Bothlyn Burn. The Boyds held the castle until 1642, when James, 9th Lord Boyd sold it to the advocate James Roberton, grandson of John Roberton, 9th Laird of Earnock, later Lord Bedlay. The Robertons extended the castle, and held the property until 1786. Since then the castle has been owned by a number of people, including the Campbells of Petershill, who built a family mausoleum in the grounds. Bedlay is still privately owned and occupied as a house.

As of May 2007, Bedlay Castle was up for sale.

== The castle ==
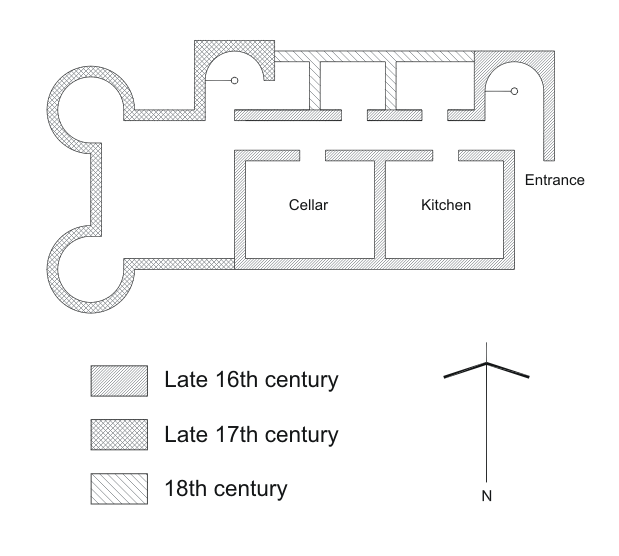
Floor plan of Bedlay Castle with approximate dates of construction.

Bedlay Castle stands on a natural defensive point, protected on three sides by watercourses, with the approach from the south. The original castle, built soon after 1580, was a simple tower house of two storeys and an attic. The tower house was around 13 by 7.5 metres, and had a square stair tower protruding from the north-east corner. On the ground floor were two vaulted cellars, with a hall above. The stair tower was later modified by the addition of an extra storey, reached by a spiral stair corbelled out from the join of the stair tower and the main block.

The second phase of building at Bedlay took place in the late 17th century, with a large extension added to the west. This extension is of the same height as the original building, with a single room on each floor. Round towers finish off both western corners of the extension. Because the extension was built on lower ground, an extra floor was created at the lower level, accessed from the ground floor, and including a hidden room beneath one of the towers.

A linking block of two storeys was added to the north side in the 18th century. Other modernisations include large sash windows, and the division of the main hall into two rooms. Garden ornaments including the stone balustrades and gate piers were brought here by the Campbells from their now-demolished property at Petershill.

== Ghostlore ==
A horse and carriage have also been heard in the lane beside the house, an old coach road. The Campbell mausoleum was also said to be haunted, until the building was moved to a nearby cemetery.
