= Lenzie Old Parish Church =

Church in Lenzie, Scotland

Lenzie Old
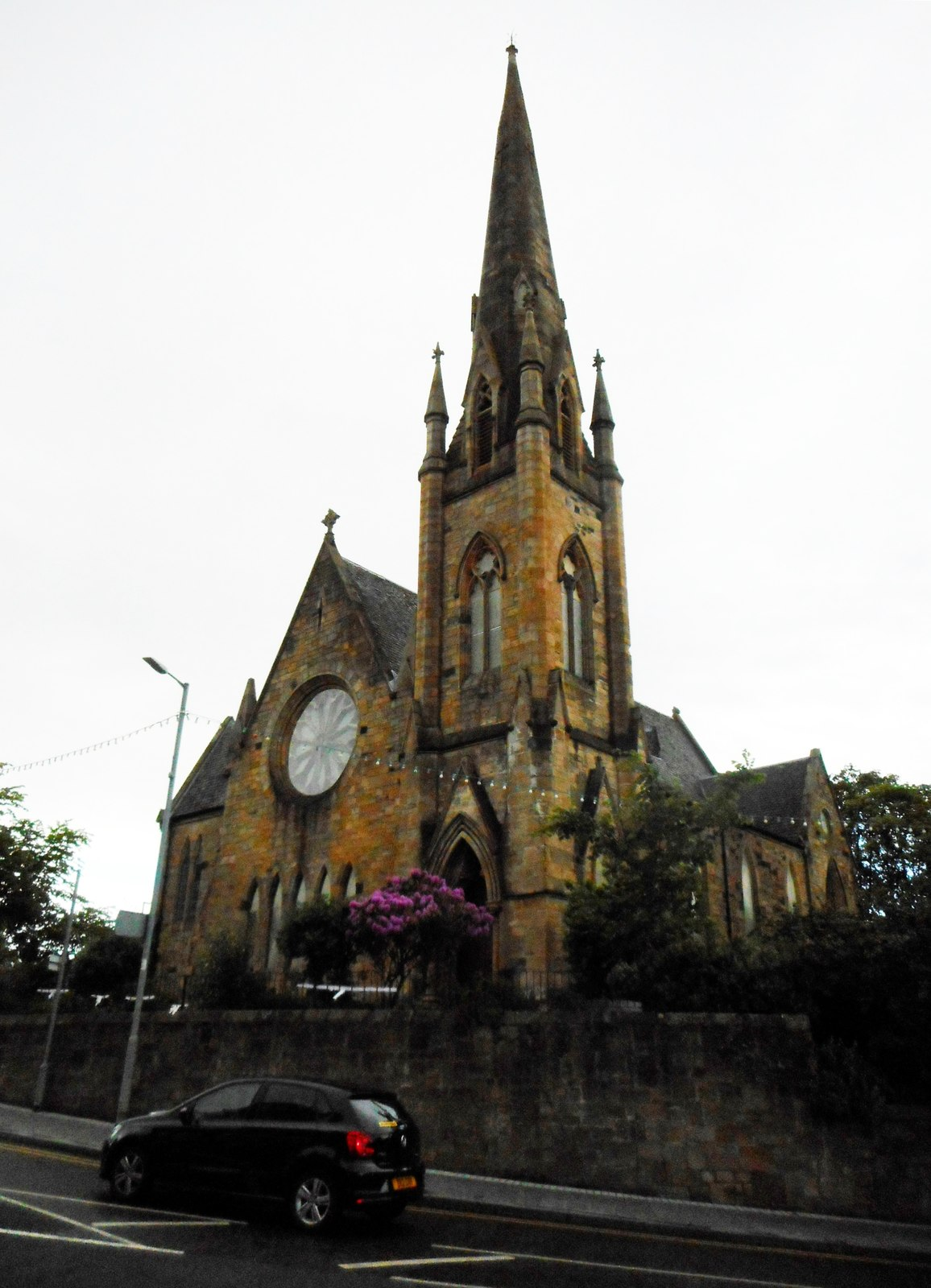
- Lenzie Old
- 55.9223°N 4.1537°W
- Denomination: Church of Scotland

History
- Status: Active

Architecture
- Heritage designation: Grade C
- Designated: 17 August 1977
- Architect(s): Clarke & Bell
- Completed: 1874

Specifications
- Materials: brick

Lenzie Old Parish Church is a listed church in the town of Lenzie in Dunbartonshire, Scotland.

The church, originally a chapel of ease, was completed in 1874. Although its name is ancient in origin, modern Lenzie only started to develop after piped water was extended to the area in the 1870s. Lenzie Old was one of three churches which were all built in the decade (St Cyprian's and Lenzie Union Parish Church were the others). The church gained listed status in 1977.
