= Devro =

UK-based manufacturing company

Devro plc
- Company type: Private limited company
- Traded as: LSE: DVO
- Industry: Food processing
- Founded: 1950
- Headquarters: Moodiesburn, Chryston, Scotland
- Key people: Gerard Hoetmer (Chairman); Rutger Helbing (CEO)
- Products: Collagen sausage and cooked meat casings; collagen films and casings for the medical and cosmetics industries
- Revenue: ▲£252.4 million (2021)
- Operating income: ▲£42.7 million (2021)
- Net income: ▲£31.1 million (2021)
- Owner: SARIA
- Website: www.devro.com

Devro plc is a multinational company with a registered office in Moodiesburn, Chryston, Scotland which manufactures and distributes goods derived from collagen, principally Sausage casings, a product in which it is the world leader. The firm also produces films, casings, and other specialised collagen products for use in the healthcare and cosmetics industries. The company was acquired by SARIA in 2023.

== History ==
Devro was founded as a new business of Johnson & Johnson in 1960 after its researchers developed a material suitable for the manufacture of sausage casings from collagen. The business name was devised as an acronym of "Development and Research Organisation", the Johnson & Johnson unit from which it emerged.

The firm was subject to a £108 million management buyout from Johnson & Johnson in 1991 and was listed on the London Stock Exchange two years later.

In 1996 it acquired the American firm Teepak International for US$135 million, including its majority stake in the Czech company Cutisin. The Czech unit was fully acquired in 2004.

Devro sold its cellulose business in 2000 for £4.8m, which resulted in a massive exceptional loss of £54.5m.

In early 2007 Devro engaged in talks with an undisclosed suitor, rumoured to be its then-largest shareholder Acomita Investment (a vehicle controlled by John Magnier), over a takeover of the company. The talks were however terminated after an agreement could not be reached on issues relating to its pension scheme.

The company was promoted to the FTSE 250 Index on 27 August 2010 after the acquisition of Arriva by Deutsche Bahn was completed.

In late 2015, Devro acquired PVI Industries, a Dutch-based collagen manufacturer, in a £10m deal.

Peter Page stepped down as Chief Executive on 28 February 2018, after almost 11 years in the position. He was replaced by Rutger Helbing, the company's former Finance Director.

In November 2022, the company agreed to a £540m takeover offer by SARIA Bio-Industries AG & Co. KG. The acquisition was completed in April 2023.

== Operations ==
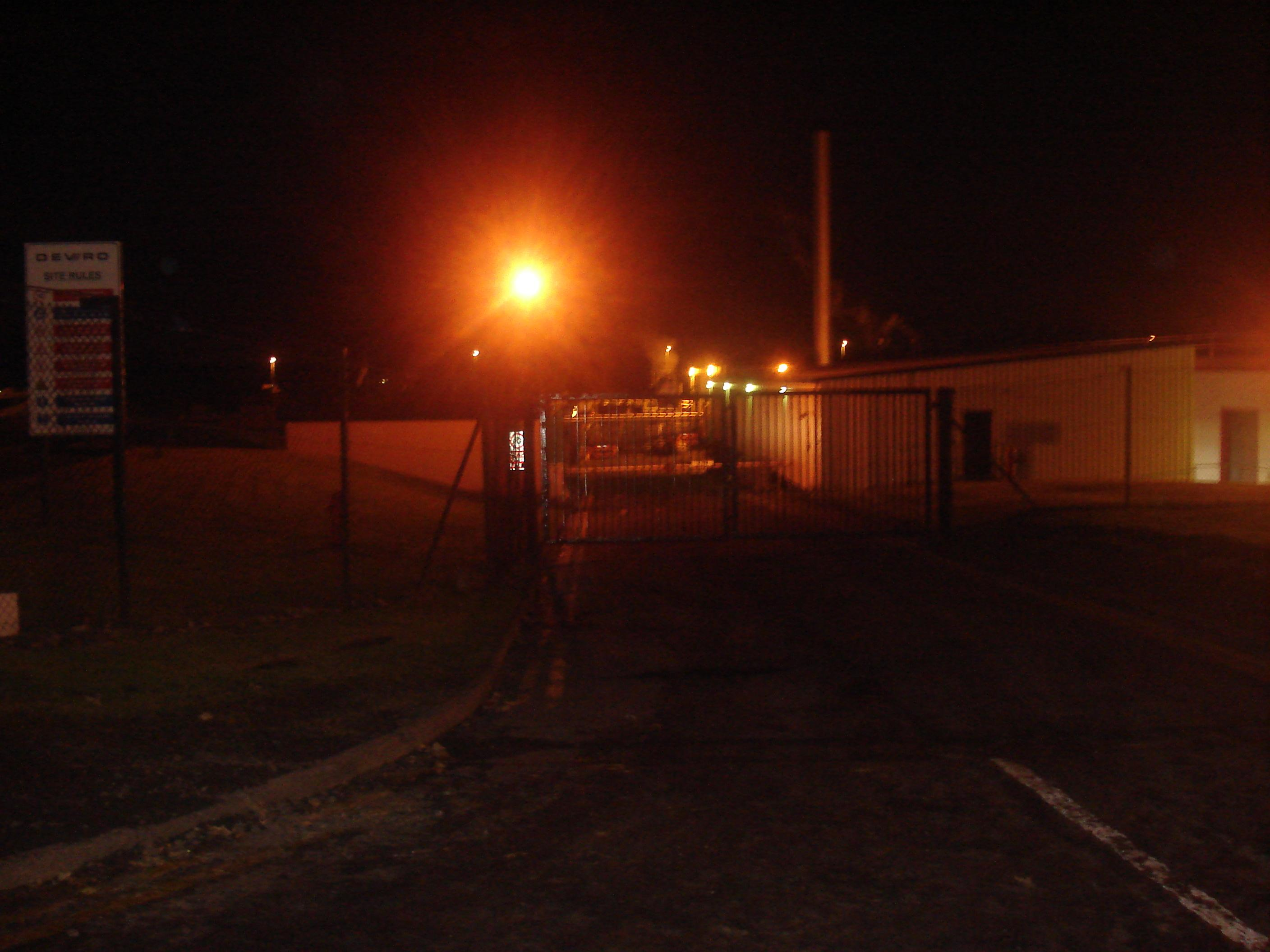
Devro HQ's manufacturing area at night

The majority of the company's employees are based in Europe, with the majority of these at manufacturing and research and development facilities in Jilemnice and Slavkov in the Czech Republic.

The company's largest manufacturing site by volume is also the newest, in Nantong, China, other manufacturing and technical plants are located in Jilemnice, Czech republic, Sandy Run, South Carolina in the United States and Bathurst, New South Wales in Australia.
