= Charlie Hodgson (rugby union, born 1938) =

Scottish rugby union player

- Full name: Charles Gordon Hodgson
- Born: 11 May 1938 Lenzie, Scotland
- Died: 19 July 2023 (aged 85) New Jersey, United States
- School: Lenzie Academy; Glasgow High School
- Occupation: Quantity surveyor

Rugby union career
- Position: Wing
International career
Years	Team	Apps	(Points)
1968	Scotland	2	(0)

Charles Gordon Hodgson (11 May 1938 – 19 July 2023) was a Scottish international rugby union player.

== Biography ==
=== Early life ===
Born and raised in Lenzie, Hodgson first started playing rugby at Lenzie Academy, under the guidance of ex-Rangers footballer Billy Williamson, before finishing his schooling at Glasgow High School.

=== Rugby career ===
Hodgson, a pacy winger, played his early senior rugby with Glasgow HSFP and scored the try that won them the 1961-62 Scottish Unofficial Championship. He joined London Scottish the following season after moving to Portsmouth for work and went on to captain the club. In 1968, Hodgson won two Scotland caps during the Five Nations, against Ireland at Lansdowne Road and England at Murrayfield. He was a county representative for both Hampshire and Middlesex.

=== Later years ===
Married to an American, Hodgson relocated with his family to the United States in 1969 to work at the New York office of a British surveying company and was later employed by Joseph Natoli Construction, of which he became Executive Vice President.

== See also ==
- List of Scotland national rugby union players
