= Charles Hodgson =

Charles Hodgson may refer to:

- Charles Hodgson (artist) (c.1770–1856), English landscape painter
- Roger Hodgson (Charles Roger Pomfret Hodgson, born 1950), English musician
- Charlie Hodgson (born 1980), English rugby union player
- Charlie Hodgson (rugby union, born 1938) (1938–2023), Scottish international rugby union player

== See also ==
- Charles Hodgson Fowler (1840–1910), English ecclesiastical architect
