= Alasdair Graham (pianist) =

Scottish pianist

Alasdair Graham (19 April 1934 – 25 July 2016) was a Scottish concert pianist and accompanist, and later an academic at the Royal College of Music.

== Life ==
Graham was born in Glasgow, son of James Graham, a joiner; christened Alexander, he later preferred the name Alasdair. The family moved soon afterwards to Kirkintilloch, and he was educated at Lenzie Academy. An aunt who was an accomplished pianist encouraged his interest in the piano. With a scholarship he went to the University of Edinburgh where he graduated in 1954; he studied at the Vienna State Academy for two years, and in Siena, Italy. In the UK he studied with Peter Katin.

He began a career as solo pianist, playing with the Scottish National Orchestra and other orchestras; he was popular with the Bournemouth Symphony Orchestra. He played at the Proms, working with conductors including Malcolm Sargent and Charles Groves. He also gave solo recitals, and was known as a sympathetic accompanist for debutante singers.

Graham's concert schedule involved much travelling, and his health was often fragile. In his late thirties he suffered a nervous breakdown, and did not afterwards play in public; he turned to teaching, becoming a professor at the Royal College of Music. After his retirement in 2003, the Royal College of Music set up an annual award in his name for accompanists.
