= Gadloch =

Loch in Scotland

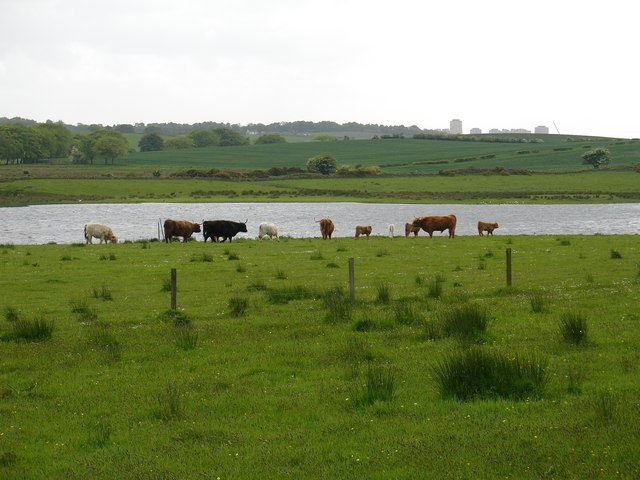
- Highland Cattle with the Gadloch in the background, viewed from the Crosshill Road direction

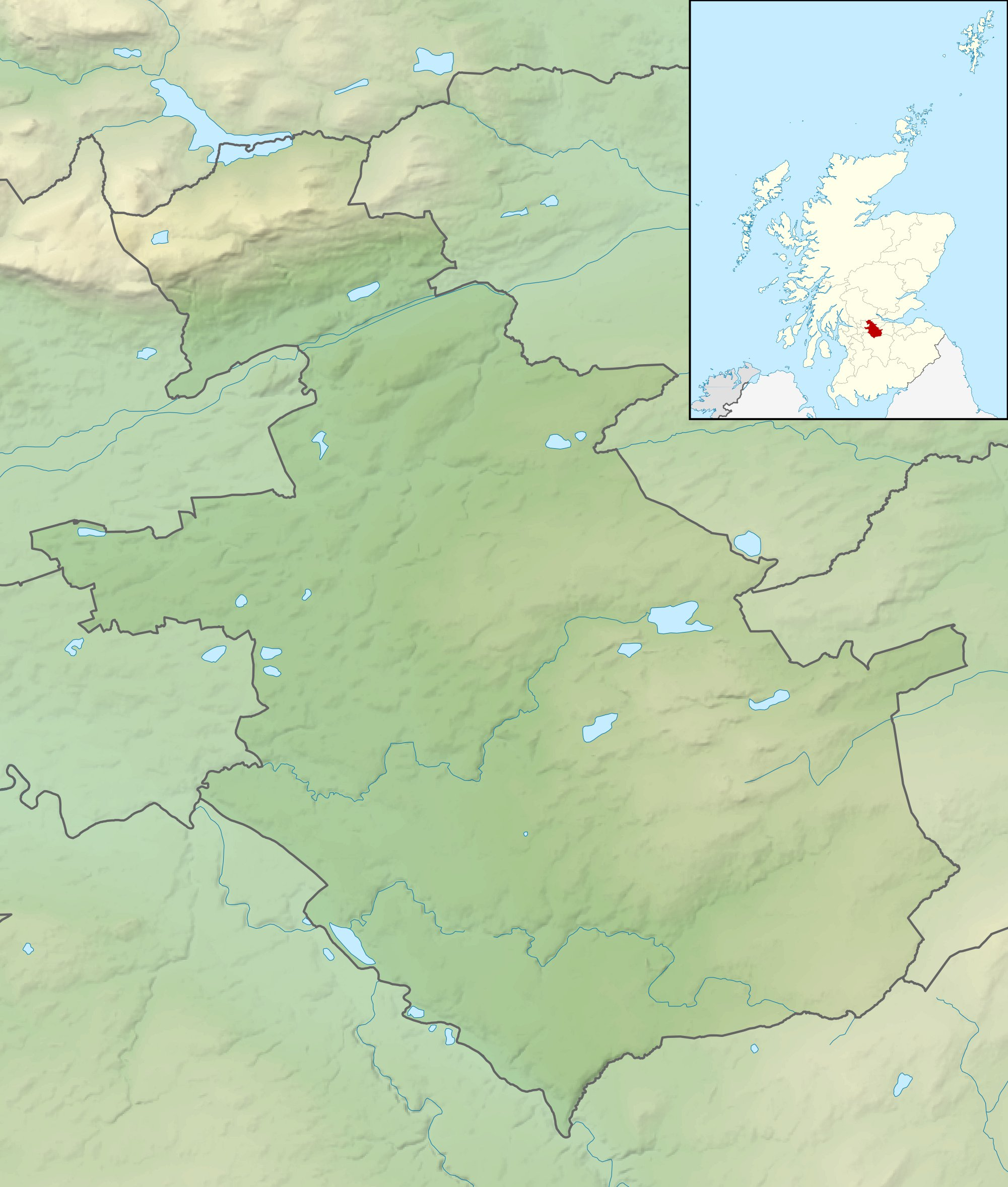
- Location within North Lanarkshire
- Location: North Lanarkshire
- Coordinates: 55.913428°N 4.163132°W
- Lake type: freshwater loch
- Basin countries: Scotland
- Surface area: 52 acres (21 hectares)
- Average depth: 8 feet (2.4 metres)
- Settlements: Auchinloch, Lenzie

The Gadloch is a fresh water loch in North Lanarkshire, situated near the town of Lenzie, Scotland.

To the south of the loch is the small village of Auchinloch. The village's name means "Field of the Loch" in Scottish Gaelic, and derives from its proximity to the Gadloch.

== History ==
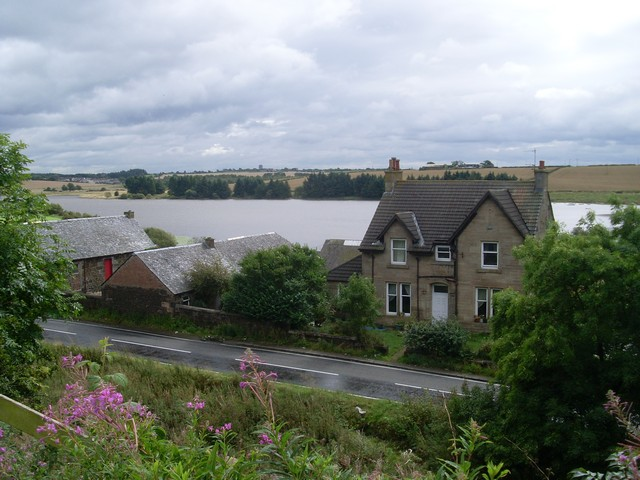
Wester Gadloch Farm with the Gadloch behind it, viewed from the direction of the railway bridge

The Gadloch was originally much larger, but was reduced by the addition of a drainage tunnel. Local folklore has it that the tunnel was excavated by Napoleonic prisoners of war in the early 19th century, though it is generally accepted that the tunnel predates that period. Following this the drained land was used for agricultural purposes and farms were built at the east and west ends of the Gadloch. The 18th century Easter Gadloch Farm was left unoccupied for a number of years but has now been re-developed. Over the years, the tunnel became compromised, and the water levels of the loch rose back towards their original height. Recent works have rectified this. Parkhillhead Farm overlooks the loch from the south.

== Curling ==
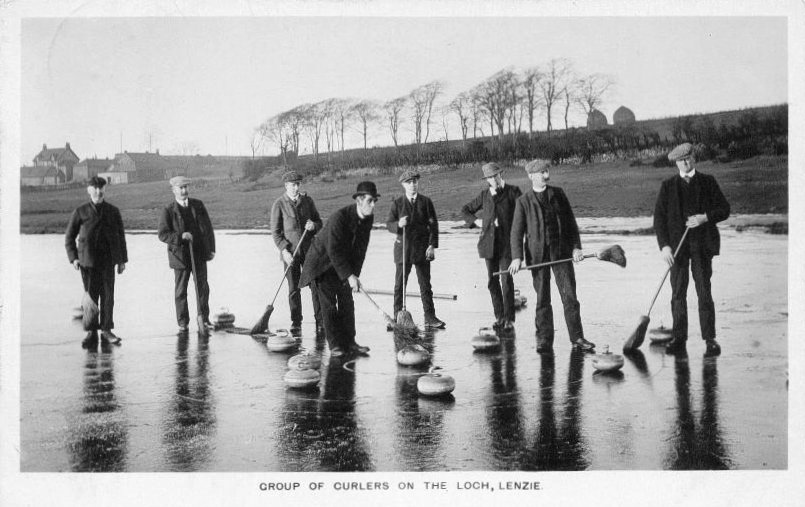
Group of curlers on the loch, Lenzie

In winter when there is thick enough ice the Gadloch is often used for curling and has been for many years. Several postcards depict curlers on the Gadloch in 1910. As of winter 2010/11, curlers were still active on the Gadloch. Cadder Curling Club was previously based in an old railway wagon at the loch's edge.

== Wildlife ==
Bird watchers are frequently seen at the Gadloch as it has a variety of bird species present and has been known to attract rare and non-native species as well, including some escaped from captivity. In the 1970s, white pelicans were sighted on the loch.

== Deaths ==
=== 1970s ===
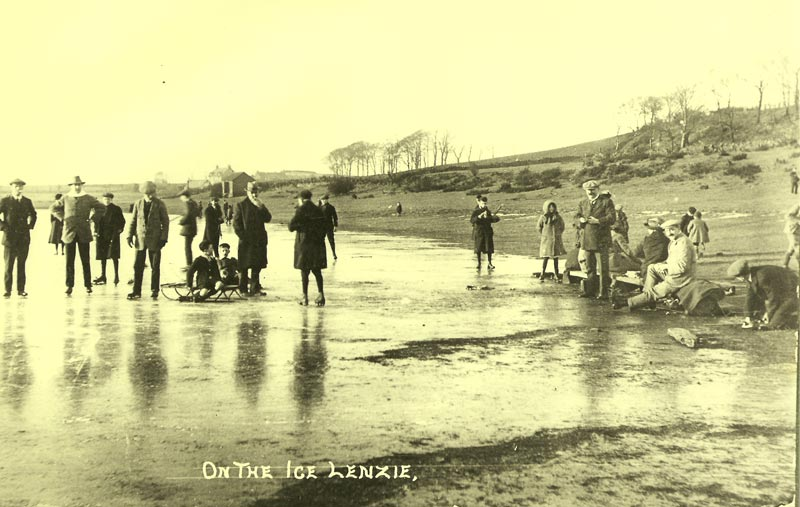
Early 1900s view of skaters on the frozen Gadloch

In 1974, Lee Fraser from Auchinloch fell through the ice along with his sledge, but died of hypothermia before he could be rescued.

=== 1980s ===
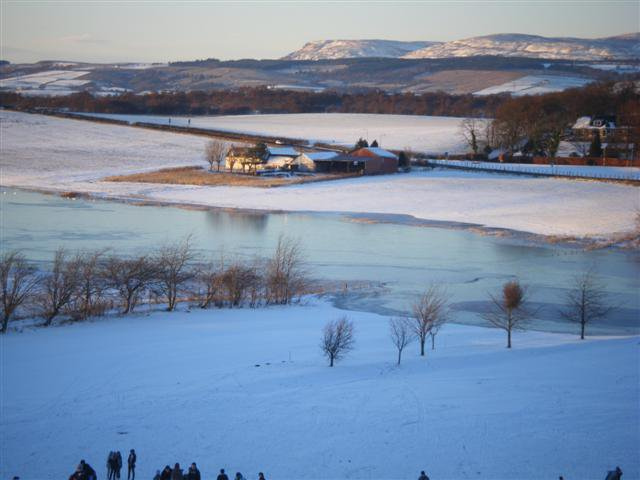
Frozen Gadloch, Winter 2010

In the 1980s one of the accused on trial for murders claimed to have killed and disposed of a man in the Gadloch The police and their underwater unit searched the loch but no body was ever found. "Mr. McEwan also claimed that another alleged victim was driven to Gadloch, near Lenzie, where his head was held under the water until he drowned. The body was then weighted down with bricks and left there".

=== 2011 ===
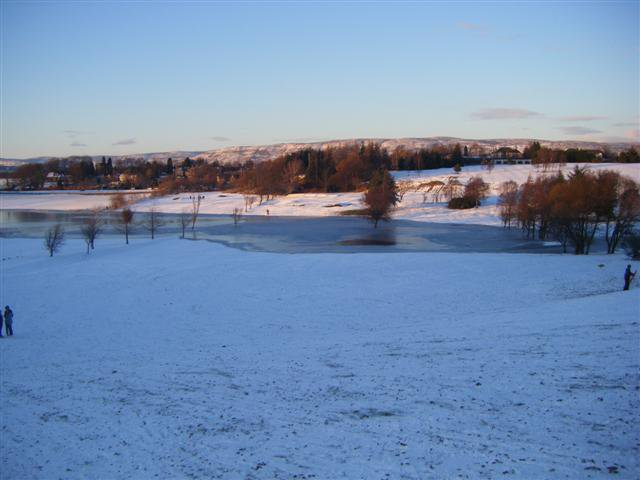
Frozen floodwater extending into Golf Course

On Sunday 18 December 2011 37-year-old builder John McAllister drowned after falling into the loch trying to rescue the family's 14-year-old pet spaniel Tain who had gone into the water. Strathclyde Police said that his body was recovered from the Gadloch following an extensive search involving both a police helicopter and divers. Roddy McAllister, 56, last heard his step-son John, 37, shout 'I'm needing help' as he struggled in the water at the popular walking area. John and Roddy had earlier been walking their six dogs when 14-year-old Tain had wandered onto the ice. Attempts to coax her back towards the shore were fruitless so the two ventured homewards expecting that Tain would return. Not long afterwards John noticed Tain in trouble from his house window overlooking the Gadloch and rushed to her aid planning to use the blue lilo he had grabbed to prevent him going through the ice. The lilo burst when John tried to hoist her out of the causing them both to plunge into the freezing waters. Strathclyde Fire and Rescue were also involved and the Officers of Strathclyde Police cordoned off an area of the adjacent Crosshill Road up to half-a-mile from the scene. Moving swiftly the Police had begun the search not long after 5pm and were using a helicopter to light up the water. An added difficulty was that the isolated spot sat behind an unoccupied farm house and was surrounded by trees, obscuring the accident site from the road and nearby Lenzie. McAllister's step-father Roddy and other family members were at the scene as the loch was being searched. The Police had been called to the incident at around 5.05pm that evening together with ambulance and fire and rescue services, McAllister's body was recovered at around 7.30pm. Tain also lost her life through drowning. The next day Roderick McAllister spoke of how the family were proud of son John for trying to save Tain: "I would say he was a real hero - a silly hero, but we are proud of him."His funeral was held on 7 January 2012 at Daldowie Crematorium and the family asked attendees to make donations to the Dogs Trust instead of flowers.

== Flooding ==
Flooding from the Gadloch severe enough to close the neighbouring roads has been common for many years. In more recent years, the Gadloch's drainage tunnel has collapsed and the water levels have risen even further, flooding into the nearby Lenzie Golf Course and affecting nearby farmland and Crosshill Road. In 2011/2012 parts of the golf course were ruined by the flooding and four different fairways had to be relaid and returfed after the Gadloch encroached more than 200 metres onto the greens. The heights reached by the water have become such a problem that the Lenzie community council has created a special section of its website to deal with coverage of the issue. In the winter time the frozen Gadloch covers the path to Auchinloch and members of the public have been taken to hospital after falling through the ice.

== Gallery ==
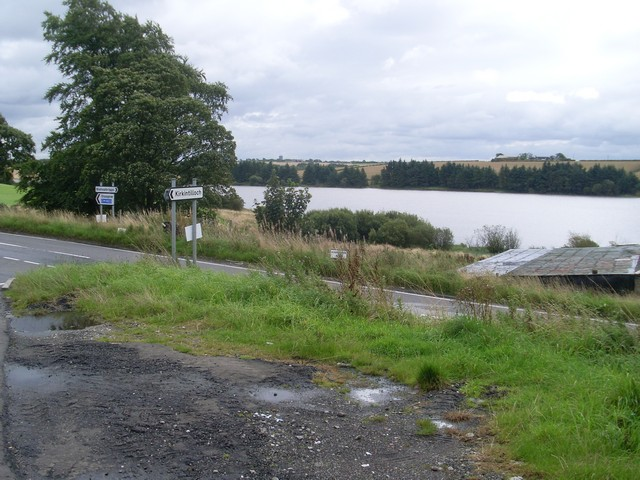
Gadloch from Crosshill Road

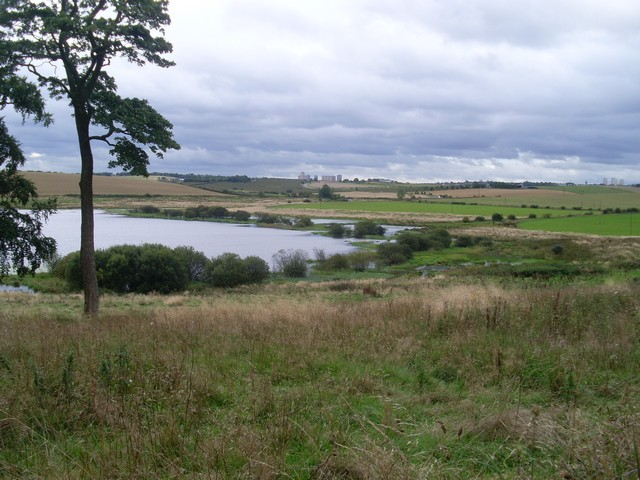
Southwest view across Gadloch Towards the distant Red Road Flats.

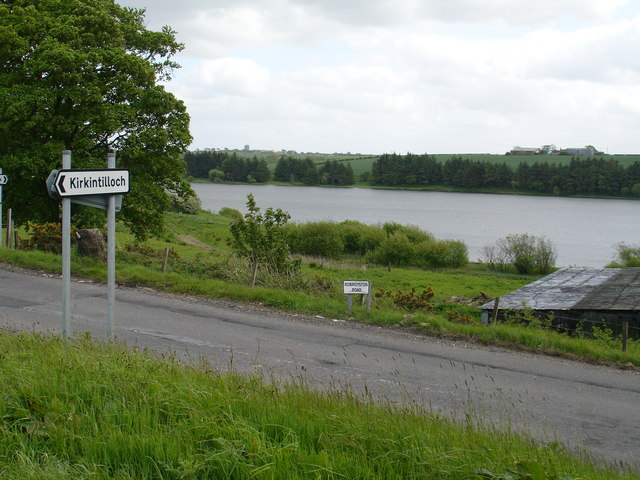
Gadloch

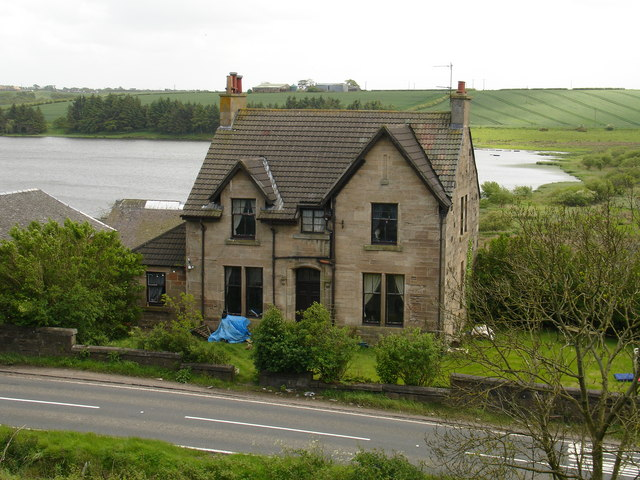
Wester Gadloch Farm, locally known as Loch Farm, the Gadloch can be seen in the distance

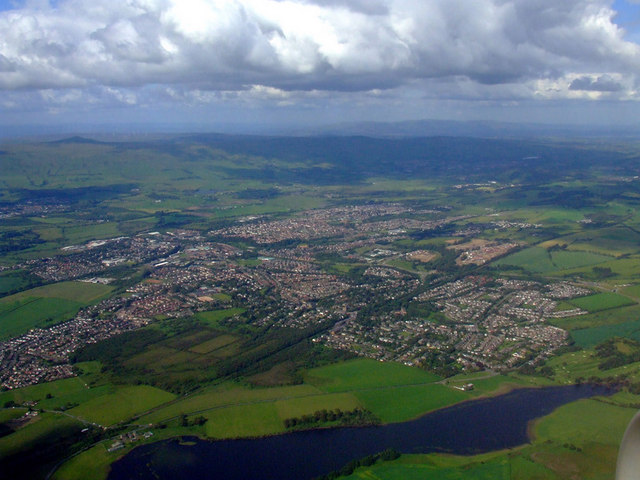
Lenzie from the air, Gadloch is in the foreground.

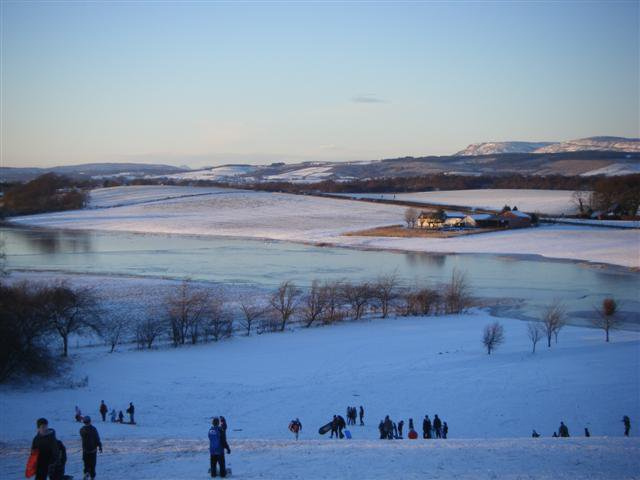

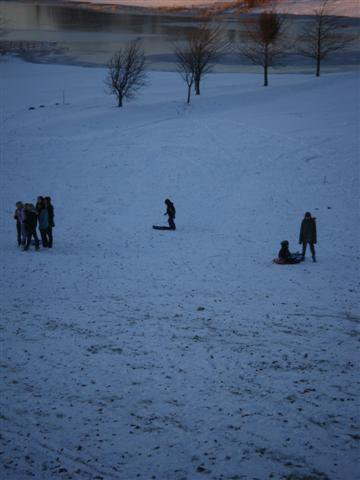

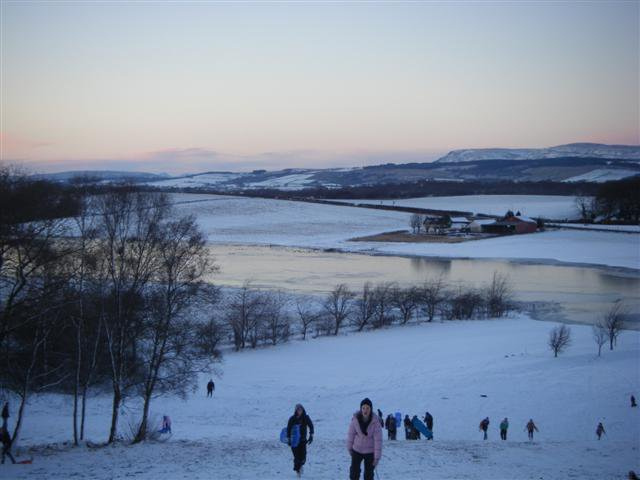
