= Jimmy Mack (broadcaster) =

Scottish broadcast reporter

Jimmy Mack MBE ( 26 June 1934–3 July 2004), born James F. McRitchie, was a Scottish broadcaster, best known for his work on BBC Radio Scotland and Radio Clyde.

Mack was born in Greenock, Scotland, on 26 June 1934. He was educated at Lenzie Academy and Bathgate Academy. He worked for the Guardian Royal Exchange insurance company from 1956 until 1970; his broadcasting career started in 1965 on the pirate radio station Radio Scotland 242, which was closed down in 1967 under the provisions of the Marine Broadcasting Offences Act 1967. Thereafter, he joined the BBC in Glasgow, including working as a DJ on BBC Radio 1, BBC Radio 2's Night Ride programme and BBC Radio 4 Scotland.

He moved to Kent, England, in 1970, becoming a presenter on the Chatham-based BBC Radio Medway (now BBC Radio Kent), plus occasional broadcasts on BBC Radio 2. He also produced some programmes for the national BBC Radio 4, such as You and Yours.

Following the launch of BBC Radio Scotland in 1978, Mack returned to Scotland in 1979, becoming presenter of the mid-morning programme (The Jimmy Mack Show), which in 1988 broadcast live from the Glasgow Garden Festival for a total of 108 consecutive outside broadcasts, a possible record for such a programme.

He became well-known on television in Scotland, with programmes for the BBC as well as Grampian Television and Scotland Today for STV.

In 1990, he left Radio Scotland to work for the commercial station Radio Clyde in the west of Scotland, becoming one of the station's main presenters on Clyde 2 from the launch on 3 January 1990. Mack presented the drivetime show for eight years and also presented the weekday breakfast show on occasions when main presenter Dave Marshall was off in the early 1990s, in addition to this, Mack presented some weekend specialist shows on Clyde 2 for most of the 1990s - Clyde Gold, Relax with Mack, Jimmy Mack's Chart Countdown and a 1960s show before taking over the early evening and weekend breakfast shows from September 1997 until July 2000, In 2001, he launched his own Saturday night show called Saturday Night with Jimmy Mack. He was patron of the Scottish Motor Neurone Disease Association. His charity work led to him being awarded the MBE in 1996. He continued to broadcast on Radio Clyde until two weeks before his death from cancer on 3 July 2004. He was married, with a son and a daughter.
