= Prosper De Mulder Group =

PDM Group (previously Prosper De Mulder Group) until 2011
- Company type: Private
- Industry: Food processing; energy production
- Founded: 1926
- Headquarters: Doncaster, England
- Number of locations: 23
- Area served: United Kingdom
- Key people: Prosper De Mulder, Prosper De Mulder Jr., Anthony De Mulder
- Number of employees: 1000 (2014)
- Website: www.saria.co.uk

Prosper De Mulder Group, commonly known as PDM Group, was a British group of companies that operated in a number of fields associated with the food chain. It was acquired by the German-based SARIA Group and the name was changed to SARIA in 2014. The company provided services to the agricultural and food sectors (recycling waste from meat and food industries), as a producer of green forms of energy, and as a manufacturer of products for human consumption, pet food, aquaculture, oleochemistry and agriculture.

== History ==
Prosper De Mulder was founded in 1926 in Doncaster by the De Mulder family and Prosper joined aged 16. It now employs over 1000 staff at 23 sites across the United Kingdom. Prosper De Mulder remained as Chairman until his death and was actively involved with the company until his late 80's. Away from work Mr De Mulder was active within the local Freemasons and was interested in sailing and flying. PDM Group increased its market share in the rendering (animals) industry in Britain; between 1968 and 1975, PDM acquired 79 U.K. rendering facilities, either closing, or absorbing them. PDM Group has expanded its range of food waste recycling services and has developed a business investing in Anaerobic Digestion (AD) operation to the UK. ReFood UK is reported to combine SARIA's expertise in operating AD plants with "PDM's UK food waste recycling capabilities". There are plans for a network of AD plants in the UK and use the by-product as a fertilizer

=== Sale of shares and name change ===
In 2010, German-based SARIA Group acquired a 10% interest in the group, increasing that to a controlling 51% a year later with the De Mulder family retaining the remaining shares. The company changed its name to 'SARIA' in 2014 and in February 2016, the De Mulder family sold their remaining shares to the SARIA Group.

=== Competition Commission investigation ===
PDM Group have been the subject of a Competition Commission investigation over a number of years. Following a 1993 Monopolies and Mergers Commission (MMC) report into the supply of animal waste in England and Wales and in Scotland, PDM Group were required to give undertakings to the Secretary of State for Trade and Industry. These undertakings related to the manner in which PDM had conducted its business with trading practices that had been found by the MMC to operate against the public interest. The principal issue identified in the MMC's report, in respect of PDM's trading practices, related to discriminatory pricing, and in particular the finding that there practices had harmed smaller competitors and restricted competition.

In addition, the MMC found that PDM's financial reporting were "not suitably transparent and gave a distorted account of the true profitability of its rendering business". PDM had was also found to have breached earlier undertakings relating to its gut-room business and to acquisitions, which had led to a restriction of competition.

=== Investigations regarding products not intended for human consumption ===
Rotherham council's environmental health department began an investigation in 1995 after it received a letter from an anonymous local butcher that Wells By Products, a PDM subsidiary, was illegally selling poultry not intended for human consumption. Police subsequently discovered a nationwide distribution network, using unmarked lorries, false names and paperwork to sell meat, heavily disguised to look white, which moved through a series of middlemen on to supermarkets. The investigation concluded that five meat traders had set up a secret boning shed operation at Wells By-Products’ factory at Darlton, near Newark. There, green bits of flesh, mould and feathers were removed from pet food grade meat. The meat was then hosed down and left to steep in salt baths. It was then packed and labelled as fit for humans. The scam had gone on for three years.

During the subsequent trial, which lasted for seventy days, the court heard that the conspirators had made profits of £2.5 million. On 22 December 2000, five men were jailed for a combined 24 years for supplying 1,300tons of potentially lethal condemned poultry for human consumption. Andrew Boid the former manager of the Wells By-Products factory was jailed for eight years: seven years for conspiracy and one year for fraud.

Doncaster based Nortech Foods, part of the PDM Group was investigated by the Food Standards Agency (FSA) in 2005. The investigation was launched after beef dripping made from fat not intended for human consumption was found to be on sale. The FSA investigation in conjunction with the local authorities centred on how the product entered the food chain and the extent of the problem.

The FSA said that the batch of dripping was highly unlikely to pose any risk to health because of the high temperature at which it was processed. The fat was derived from carcasses that had been through the normal hygiene and BSE controls. Nortech Foods disposed of all its remaining stock and carried out a trade withdrawal to recover from its customers any remaining dripping.

=== Fine for environmental offences ===
John Knight (Animal By Products) Ltd., based in Silvertown, London, was fined for the third time in three years in October 2012 at Thames Magistrate's Court. Newham Council received around 300 formal complaints during 2011 from local residents concerning smells emanating from the factory. The fine of £120,000 plus £66,150 costs is believed to be the largest fine ever obtained by a local authority for an offense of this nature under the Environmental Protection Act 1990. The company was found guilty of nine counts of failing to properly prevent emissions of offensive odours beyond the factory boundary in breach of its regulatory Environmental Permit. The company were previously fined £75,000 with £75,000 costs in 2011 due to odours emitted from the factory and £10,000 with £10,500 costs in 2009 when a pile of meal was left outside rotting.

== Company structure ==
PDM Group includes the following companies:

- Acacia Foods Ltd,
- Chettles Ltd
- De Mulder & Sons Ltd
- Frazer (Butchers) Ltd
- Granox Ltd (Widnes)
- J L Thomas and Company Ltd
- John Knight (Animal By Products) Ltd
- ReFood UK Ltd
- Nortech Foods Ltd
- Perimax (Scotland) Ltd
- T Quality Ltd
- Wells By Products Ltd.

== Role in spread of bovine spongiform encephalopathy ==
PDM Group grew through the 1960s to 1990s at which time it reportedly controlled 70% of Britain's meat rendering industry. PDM Group was linked with the outbreak of bovine spongiform encephalopathy (BSE). Numerous commentators have investigated a link between PDM and the outbreak of BSE and CJD.

Those linking PDM Group to BSE included David Hichclifffe, Member of Parliament for Wakefield. In early day motion 1006 (Session 1995–1996), which was tabled on 17 June 1996, he said “..Prosper De Mulder, the rendering company whose products are believed to have been a major source of BSE in cattle..”. The purpose of this early day motion was however to highlight a joint Observer World In Action investigation into the relationship between John Whitfield, MP for Dewsbury from 1983 to 1987 and PDM. During this time it was reported Mr Whifield had acted as PDM's solicitor and arranged meetings on their behalf to lobby Government Ministers not to abandon the use of meat and bone products in animal feeds. It also highlighted a donation of £10,000 that PDM had made to the Dewsbury Conservative Association in 1992 at a time when Mr Whitfield was seeking re-election.

In 2001, an employee of PDM Group, conceded it was "quite possible" that products manufactured by PDM (Prosper De Mulder) was ultimately responsible for cases of BSE worldwide.
