= Lenzie Peat Railway =

Former railway line in Scotland

Coordinates: 55°55′13″N 4°09′46″W

Lenzie Peat Railway was a narrow-gauge railway which ran on Lenzie Moss, which is situated to the west of the town of Lenzie in Scotland.

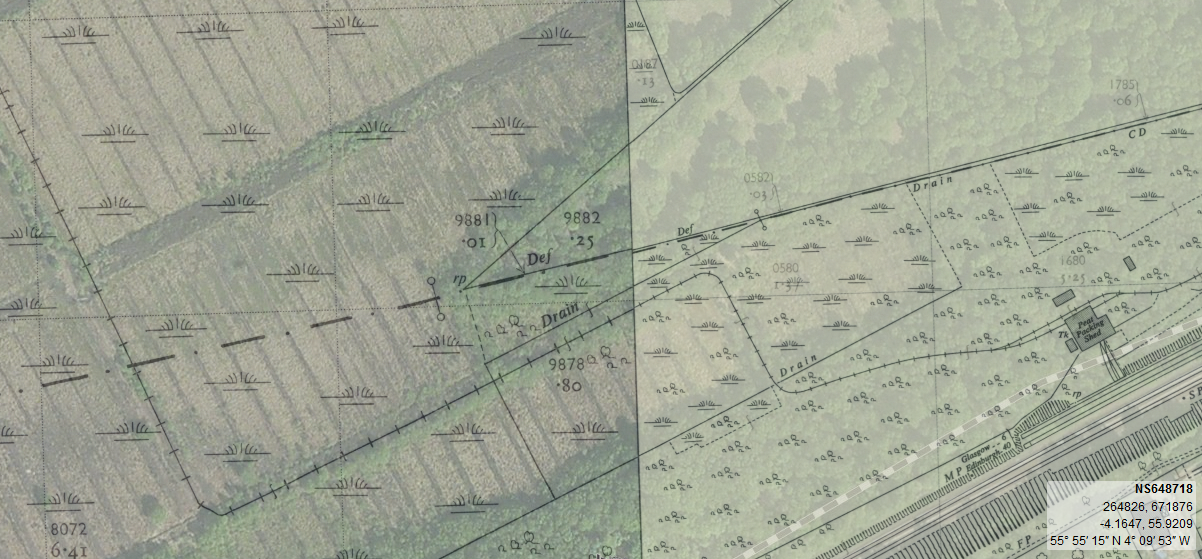
Lenzie Peat Railway map circa 1960

The bogs of the moss were exploited for peat, and the site was served by a 2 ft (610 mm) railway which took the cut peat to a storage and dispatch area (peat packing shed on the map) adjacent to the Edinburgh and Glasgow Railway (E&G). The works were owned by the Peat Development Co Ltd.

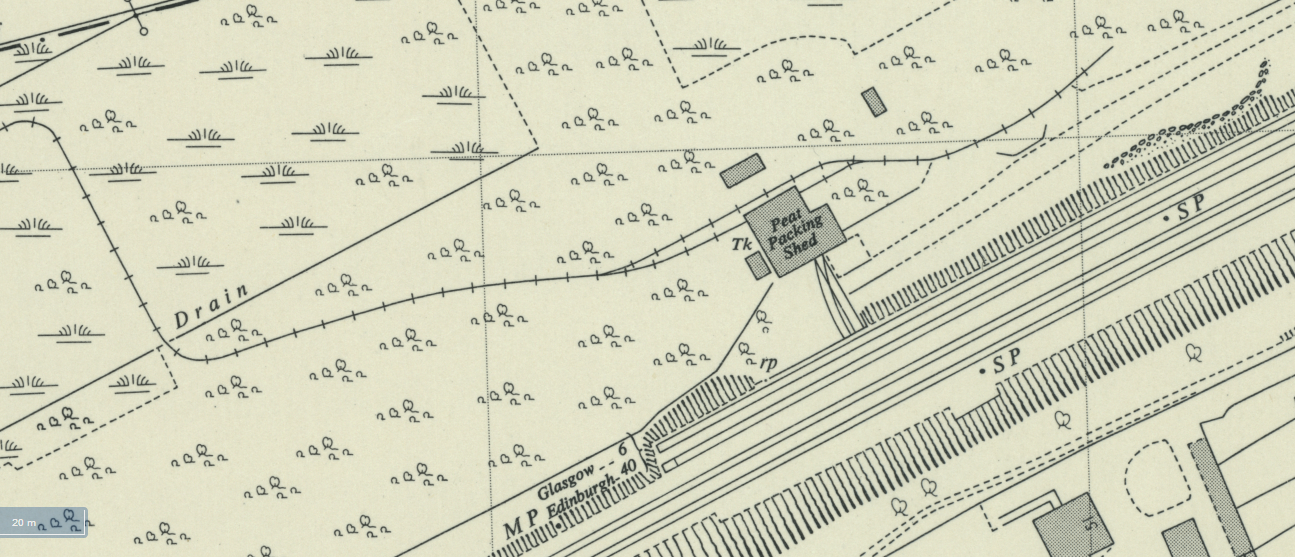
Lenzie Peat Railway peat packing shed

The railway was worked by two Lister petrol locomotives, Works Nos. 26286 of 1944 and 29890 of 1946. The Lenzie Peat Railway closed around 1966. The Lister locomotive 29890 is now owned by the West Lancashire Light Railway.

Lister locomotive 29890 in 2015

The cut peat was transported in wooden slatted wagons to the peat packing shed, and would be loaded onto trains at the sidings next to the Edinburgh and Glasgow Railway just west of Lenzie station, and then onwards transported (see map). The brick foundations of the peat packing shed are still evident today.

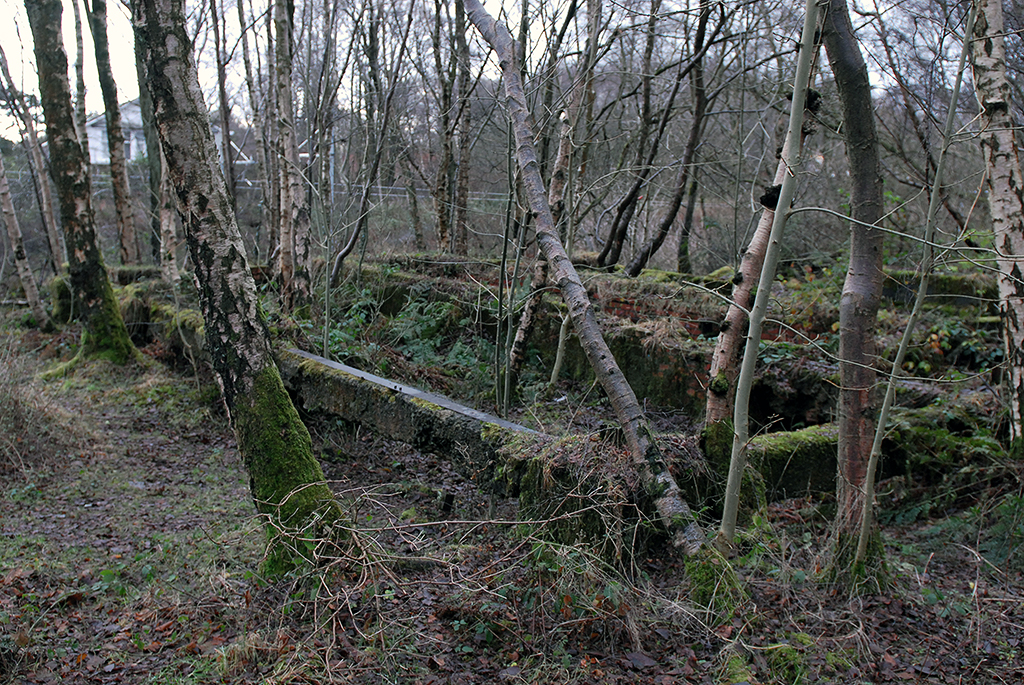
Remnants of the peat packing shed foundations in 2017

The following information appears on the East Dunbartonshire Council information board at the site of the peat packing shed brick foundations:

Little is known of the early human history of the Lenzie Moss area. There is evidence, however, that the peat processing on the site dates from the 13th Century. A charter granted by King Alexander II of Scotland in 1226 to Cambuskenneth Abbey, Stirlingshire, allowed the Canons of the Abbey to remove peat from the Moss. This right was later enjoyed by the freemen of the burgh known as "Peat Lords". The growth of the use of peat after the Second World War saw large-scale extraction by Lenzie Peat Development Company. A private railway siding, west of Lenzie station, was built to transport the peat in wooden slatted wagons from the peat bog to the storage and despatch shed. From here it was transported onwards via Lenzie station. This activity was responsible for flattening the original dome shape of the raised bog and created the ditches and baulks which characterise much of the surface today. The company ceased operation in the 1960s. In 2009, under East Dunbartonshire Council, Lenzie Moss was established as a Local Nature Reserve. Today, these brick foundations are all that remain of the commercial peat processing plant.
