= Chryston =

Coordinates: 55.906°N 4.110°W

Chryston: Scottish Gaelic: Baile Chrisdein; Scots: Chrystoun
- Village
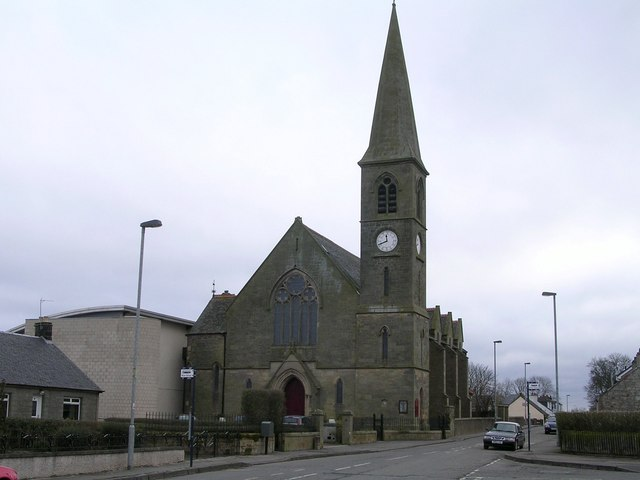
- Chryston Parish Church

- Location within North Lanarkshire Chryston (North Lanarkshire)
- Population: 3,100 (2020)
- OS grid reference: NS681701
- Council area: North Lanarkshire
- Lieutenancy area: Lanarkshire
- Country: Scotland
- Sovereign state: United Kingdom
- Post town: GLASGOW
- Postcode district: G69 9
- Dialling code: 01236
- Police: Scotland
- Fire: Scottish
- Ambulance: Scottish
- UK Parliament: Cumbernauld and Kirkintilloch
- Scottish Parliament: Coatbridge and Chryston

Chryston is a village in North Lanarkshire, around 7 miles (11 km) east of Glasgow, in Scotland. It lies north of its sister village, Muirhead, which is on the A80. The village has around double Muirhead's population, although the exact boundary between the two modern villages is difficult to find.

== History ==
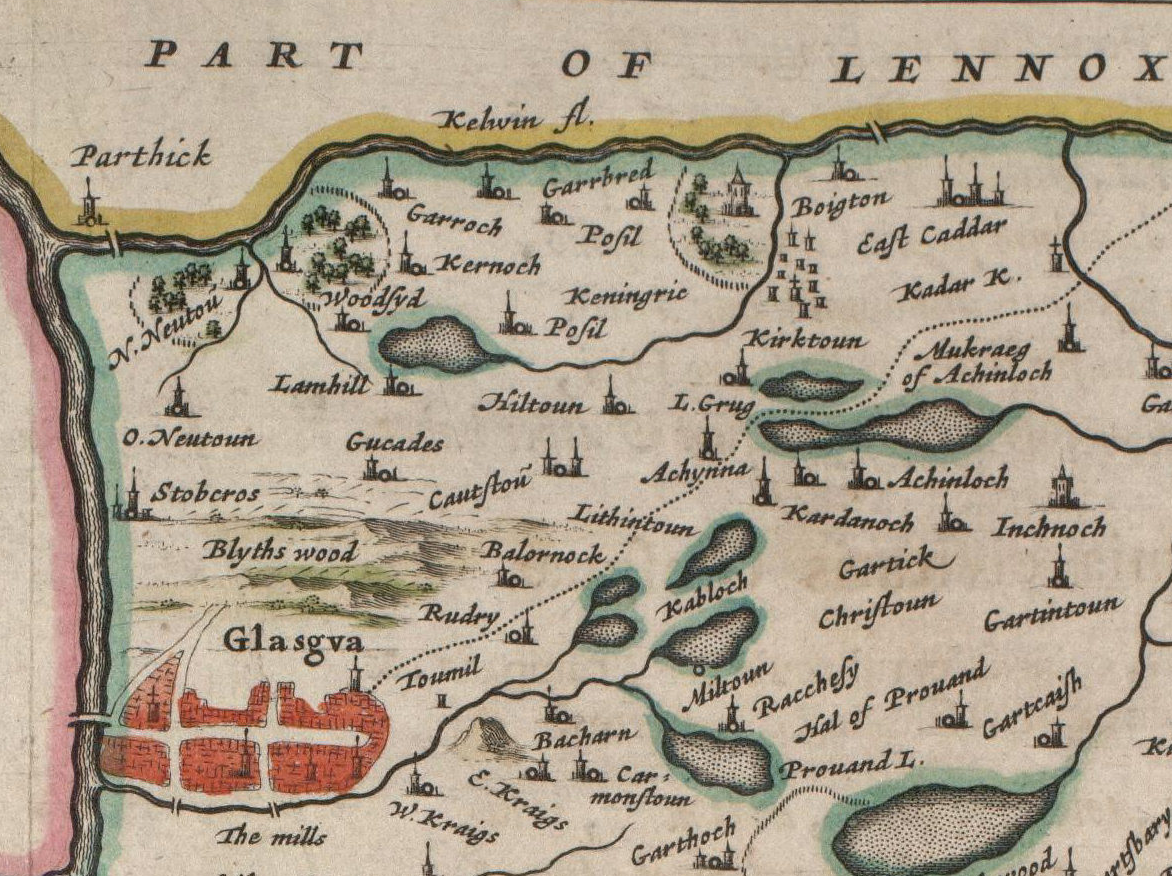
Blaeu's map based on Pont's original "Glasgow and the county of Lanark" map c.1596 depicting Chriſtoun (Chryston) north-west of Gartcaiſh (Gartcosh).

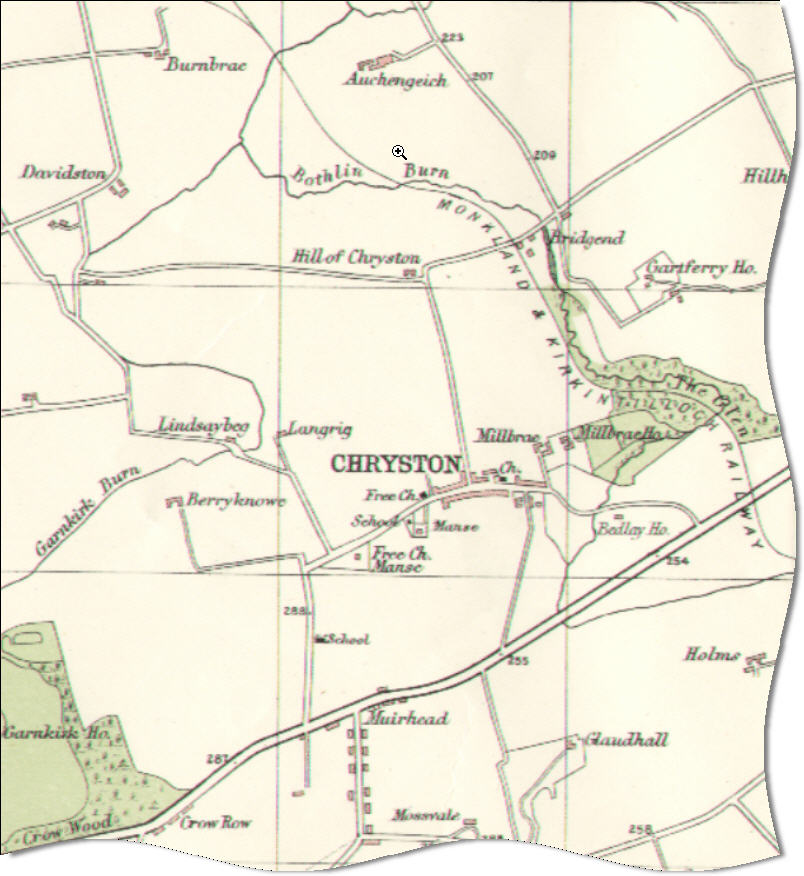
Map of Chryston in the early 1900s

The etymology of the name is uncertain but may refer to the "town of Cristinus". Several old documents show Chryston with various spellings including maps by Timothy Pont, William Forrest, Thomas Richardson, and William Roy.

In the 18th century, Chryston had one of the four schools in the parish of Cadder. William Barclay, himself a school teacher, reported the low pay of his profession in the Old Statistical Account.

One gazetteer, Samuel Lewis, from around 1846, describes a recently established library. He quotes 555 inhabitants. The same publication also stated that Chyston was a quoad sacra parish including the villages of Mollinsburn, Moodiesburn, Muirhead and the hamlet of Auchinloch. Even today Moodiesburn is often included in the Chryston district: Devro headquarters has Chryston as its official address, and Moodiesburn's Stoneyetts Hospital (originally part of East Muckcroft within the "Woodilee Estate") was sometimes listed under Chryston.

On Friday 18 September 1959, 47 miners lost their lives in the Auchengeich mining disaster at Auchengeich Colliery situated in nearby Moodiesburn.

Chryston High School is a six-year non-denominational secondary school situated on Lindsaybeg Road.

== Demography ==
Groome's Gazetteer gives historical statistics including population. The 1891 and 1901 statistics include Muirhead.

Year	Chryston Population	Quoad Sacra Parish Population
1836	374	_
1841	_	2,670
1846	555	_
1861	582	_
1871	486	3,203
1881	464	3,240
1891	899	_
1901	1,102	_

== See also ==
- List of places in North Lanarkshire
