= Lenzie Moss =

Nature reserve in East Dunbartonshire, Scotland

Coordinates: 55.92098°N 4.16515°W

Lenzie Moss is a local nature reserve in Lenzie, East Dunbartonshire, Scotland. It is a boggy, marshy area that has not been built on. The reserve comprises lowland raised bogs, which were extensively exploited for peat, and now feature the characteristics of peat cutting, and several acres of deciduous woodland mainly made up of silver birch. The area is a sanctuary for wildlife, including rabbits, deer and foxes.

The Lenzie Peat Railway was a narrow gauge railway which ran on Lenzie Moss serving the peat trade.

== Threats of development ==
In 2012 locals feared that the nature reserve was under threat after Lenzie Rugby Football Club revealed plans to develop land that borders Lenzie Moss. A local resident said: “Lenzie Moss is a unique asset and people go there for peace and tranquillity. Any development will destroy the place.” In 1989 the rugby club had applied for planning permission for 45 houses to be built on the moss, this led to opposition and petitions from locals. Protests against developing the site have attracted hundreds of local people.

The Friends of Lenzie Moss is a group formed in 1985 by enthusiasts dedicated to the conservation of Lenzie Moss.

== Incidents ==
There are ongoing problems with gangs of youths gathering on the moss. These include drinking and drug taking (and the associated littering) as well as instances of inter-gang violence. In July 2012 a 16 year old male was charged with attempted murder after a boy of 14 was hospitalised after being stabbed on the area of the Moss near Alexandra Avenue.
