= A80 road (Scotland) =

Road in Scotland

Coordinates: 55.94708°N 4.00709°W

A80

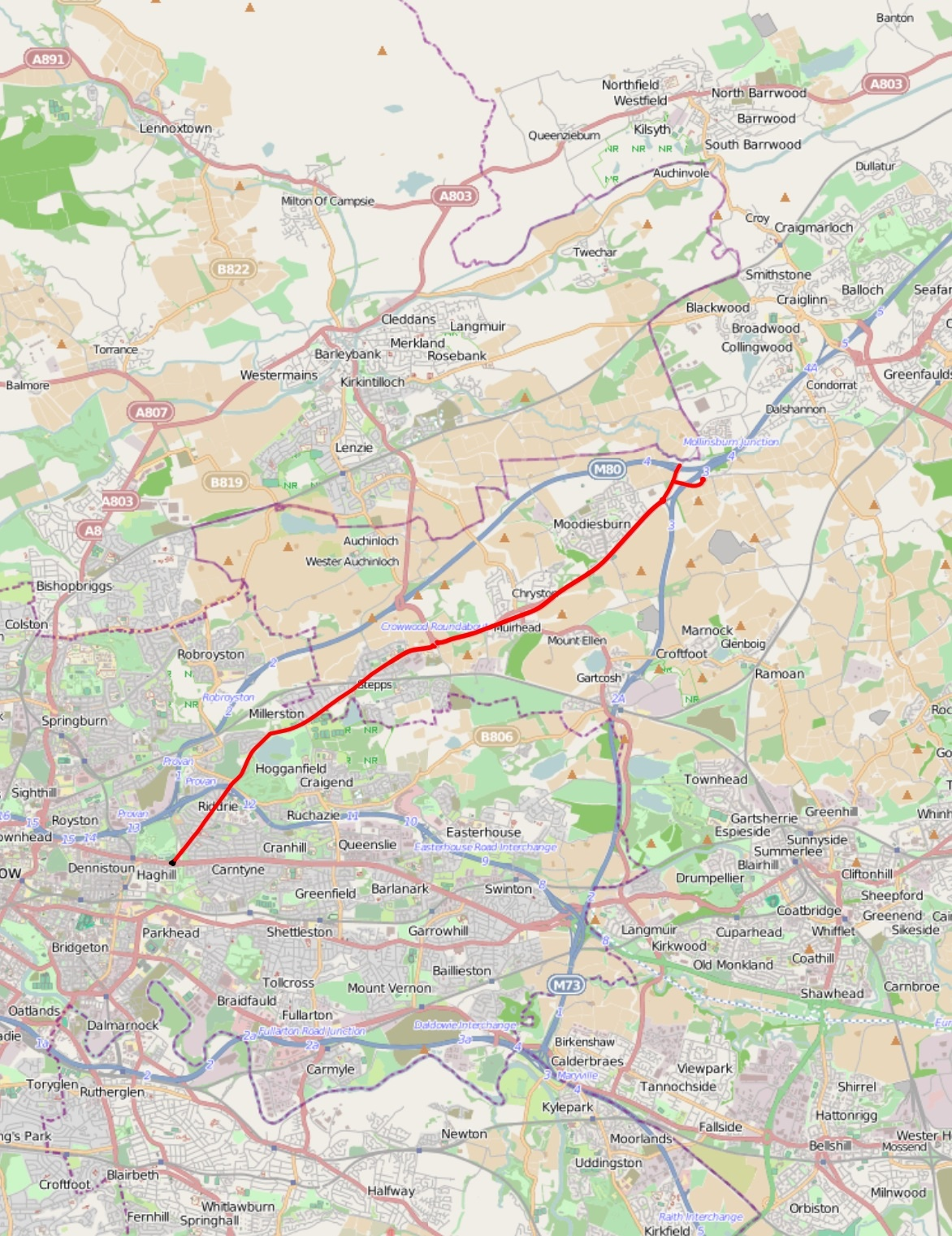
- Click map to enlarge

Route information
- Length: 7.2 mi (11.6 km)

Major junctions
- West end: A8 near Dennistoun, Glasgow
- M8 near Blackhill, Glasgow
- East end: M73 / M80 near Moodiesburn

Location
- Country: United Kingdom
- Constituent country: Scotland
- Council areas: Glasgow, North Lanarkshire

Road network
- Roads in the United Kingdom; Motorways; A and B road zones
| ← A79 | → A81 |

The A80 is a road in Scotland, running from the A8 to Moodiesburn, north east of Glasgow. Prior to the M80 opening, the A80 was one of Scotland's busiest truck roads.

== Original Route ==
The A80 was once the main route from Glasgow to Stirling. Much of the route between Glasgow and Stepps was widened to four lanes while the remainder of the route to Denny was upgraded to dual carriageway standards in the 1950s and 1960s, providing bypasses for Cumbernauld and Muirhead.

The dual carriageway ended north of Denny and continued as single carriageway, terminating on the A9 at Stirling. The route between Glasgow and Mollinsburn was later bypassed by the M80 motorway.

== A80 / M80 Upgrade project ==
=== History ===
One of Scotland's worst traffic jams has a reputation for being the A80. In 1992, the M80 Stepps bypass opened between the M8 and Stepps to relieve pressure on the road. This caused the M80 to lie in two parts with the A80 providing the link between the two sections: between the end of the Stepps bypass, and the 1974 section of the M80 which resumed at Haggs. The Stepps-Haggs stretch, built in the 1960s, was under-capacity in relation to the amount of traffic it carried, and the lack of hard shoulders meant that a vehicle breakdown potentially could cause massive jams

=== Auchenkilns roundabout upgrade ===
Despite long-term plans to replace the Stepps-Haggs section with a completed M80, the troublesome Auchenkilns roundabout in Cumbernauld was replaced by a grade separated junction in 2005 as traffic congestion meant it could not wait for the final upgrade (which at that stage, was still in planning). A dumbbell interchange junction between the A80, A73 and B8048 was opened in November 2005. A scheme was devised in the 1970s to replace the A80 with a motorway which would have linked western segment of the M80, bypassing Cumbernauld and linking to the M8, to the eastern segment, where it connects to the A803 and M876, through what was known as the Kelvin Valley Route. However, this was not implemented.

=== M80 Stepps to Haggs completion project ===
See M80 motorway

The Scottish Executive announced in 2002 that the A80 would be upgraded to Motorway standard, replacing the A80 from Stepps to Haggs with the M80. The Kelvin Valley route was not chosen as it would have breached the Antonine Wall and destroyed the Castlecary Roman fort; instead an on-line upgrade through Cumbernauld was selected.

The upgrade was completed in September 2011.

== Junction list ==
| Council area | Location | mi | km | Destinations | Notes |
|---|---|---|---|---|---|
| Glasgow | Dennistoun boundary | 0.0 | 0.0 | A8 (Cumbernauld Road / Edinburgh Road) / Todd Street to M8 / M74 – City Centre, Greenock, Edinburgh, Carlisle | Western terminus |
| Glasgow | Riddrie– Blackhill boundary | 0.9– 1.0 | 1.4– 1.6 | M8 – City Centre, Greenock, Glasgow Airport, Carlisle, Edinburgh | Access to M8 east via B765; M8 junction 12 |
| North Lanarkshire | Stepps | 3.7 | 6.0 | A806 north / Dewar Road to M80 – Stirling, Glasgow, Kirkintilloch, Crowwood, Grange | Southern terminus of A806 |
| North Lanarkshire | Chryston– Muirhead boundary | 4.4– 5.1 | 7.1– 8.2 | A752 south – Coatbridge, Gartcosh, Chryston, Muirhead | Northern terminus of A752 |
| North Lanarkshire | Moodiesburn– Mollinsburn boundary | 6.6– 7.2 | 10.6– 11.6 | M73 south / M80 – Carlisle, Glasgow, Stirling, Kincardine Bridge | Eastern terminus; northern terminus of M73; M73 junction 3; M80 junction 4 |
1.000 mi = 1.609 km; 1.000 km = 0.621 mi
