= Moodiesburn =

Coordinates: 55.918333°N 4.08666°W

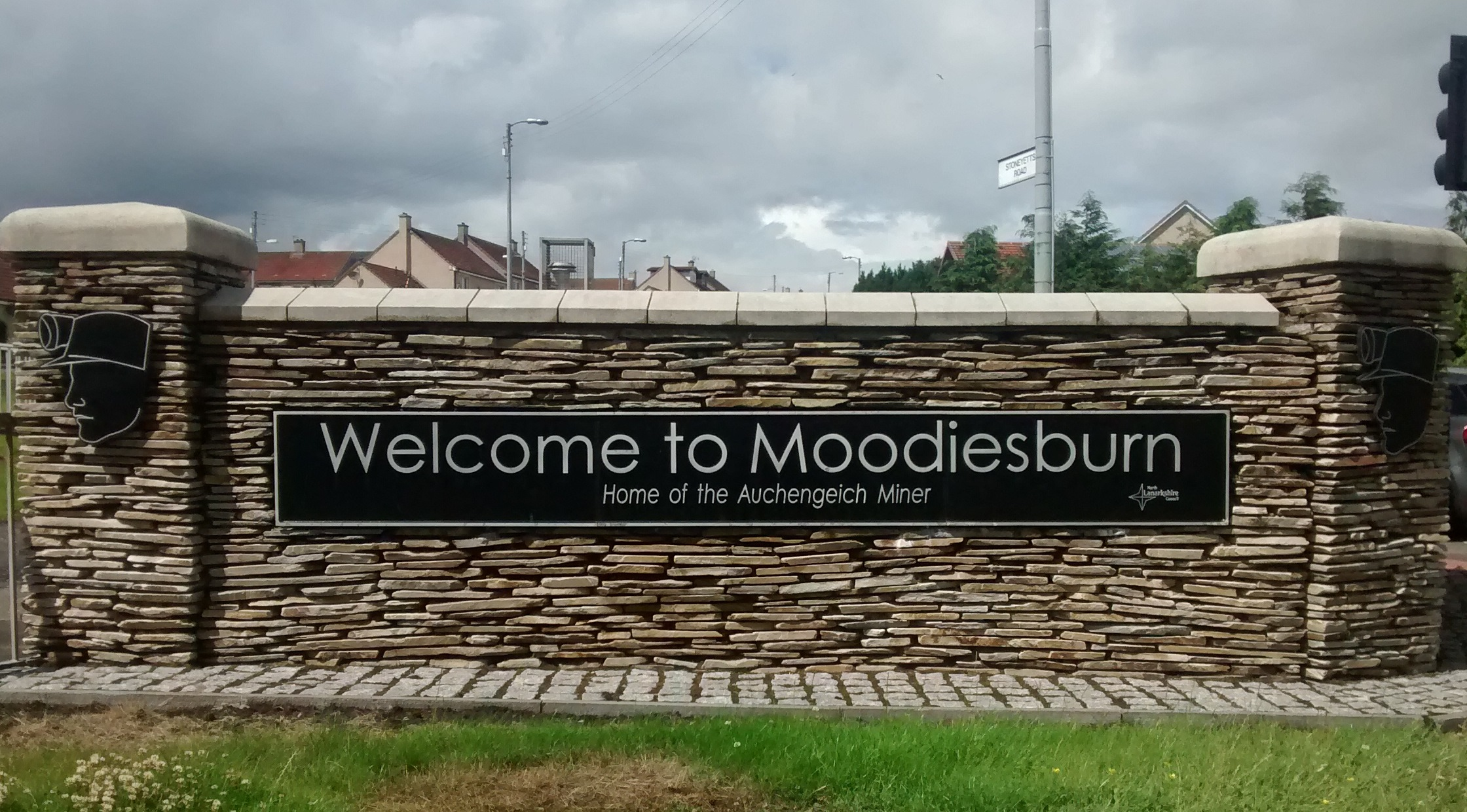
- Entrance to Moodiesburn via the A80

- Location within North Lanarkshire Moodiesburn (North Lanarkshire)
- Population: 6,830 (2020)
- OS grid reference: NS6960871434
- Council area: North Lanarkshire
- Lieutenancy area: Lanarkshire
- Country: Scotland
- Sovereign state: United Kingdom
- Post town: GLASGOW
- Postcode district: G69 0
- Dialling code: 01236
- Police: Scotland
- Fire: Scottish
- Ambulance: Scottish
- UK Parliament: Cumbernauld and Kirkintilloch
- Scottish Parliament: Coatbridge and Chryston

Moodiesburn is a village in Scotland, located 8 miles (13 kilometres) northeast of Glasgow, in the North Lanarkshire council area. It is situated on the north side of the A80 road and between the M73 and M80 motorways which converge nearby. Moodiesburn does not directly adjoin any other settlements, though the contiguous villages of Chryston and Muirhead are located a short distance to the west (the boundary being the Strathkelvin railway path) with Stepps just beyond, while outer parts of Cumbernauld lie to the east; however, its centre is about 5 miles (8 kilometres) from Moodiesburn.

The village's economic standing greatly declined in the latter half of the 20th century, following the Auchengeich mining disaster and the disintegration of local employment. In the early 21st century the economic demographic of the population has improved; good transport links enable a significant proportion of the population travel to Glasgow or nearby large towns for employment in the professional and commercial sphere.

The village is also located near several historical and cultural landmarks, including the Antonine Wall, a UNESCO World Heritage Site that was built by the Romans in the 2nd century AD. The area is popular with hikers and outdoor enthusiasts due to its scenery and proximity to the Scottish countryside.

== History ==
The etymology of the name is probably from the common Scottish surname Moody. Several old documents show Moodiesburn with various spellings including maps by Richardson, Forrest, and William Roy. Moodiesburn (or Mudiesburn) was formerly part of the parish of Cadder. The New Statistical Accounts recorded 30 families and 143 people in 1836. In 1846 there were reported to be 35 houses with 220 people living in them. Towards the end of the 19th century the population fell to as low as 150. The village was developed in the 20th century with employment in coal mining and around psychiatric institution Stoneyetts Hospital. In the 1930s, wooden houses were constructed on the estate of Gartferry House.

=== Auchengeich mining disaster ===
In September 1959, 47 men lost their lives in a coal mine near the village of Moodiesburn when a faulty fan purifying the air in the colliery went on fire due to an electrical fault. The men were in bogies travelling to the coal face to start work, and due to the intense smoke they were abandoned just a few hundred metres from safety. The mine was eventually flooded to put out the fire; there was only one survivor from the crews. The mining accident was one of the worst within the UK in the 20th century, widowing 41 women and leaving 76 children without fathers.

The First Minister of Scotland Alex Salmond unveiled a memorial on 18 September 2009 at Moodiesburn. Its centrepiece, a bronze statue of a miner, was stolen within weeks but replaced the following year after a fundraising drive. Norman Buchan wrote a song, "Auchengeich", about the disaster, recorded by Dick Gaughan and The Easy Club.

=== Aftermath and economic decline ===
Local mining declined in the years following the disaster. Stoneyetts ceased operation in 1992, followed by Scottish Power and Reekie Plant Hire sites closing in the latter half of the decade. A 1999 article in The Observer lamented Moodiesburn's lack of local employment, as well as the increasing disaffection of its younger residents:

"A good number of young families are blatantly poorer than our grandparents. They have less purchasing power because they live on benefit [...] Moodiesburn is a quiet island whose ageing inhabitants pass the time by looking after one another, visiting, retelling the past. The current that made people get up in the morning has been switched off. The young are null. They use drugs, spray graffiti. But they are quiet islanders, too, living invisibly at home with their disks and keyboards."

— Neal Ascherson, 10 October 1999

Auchengeich sewage works and the Moodiesburn House Hotel – previously the Bedlay Dowager House – were closed in 2003 and 2008, respectively. Two career options remain in the area: landscaping product supplier Charcon Scotland (part of Aggregate Industries), and food processing company Devro.

== Landmarks ==
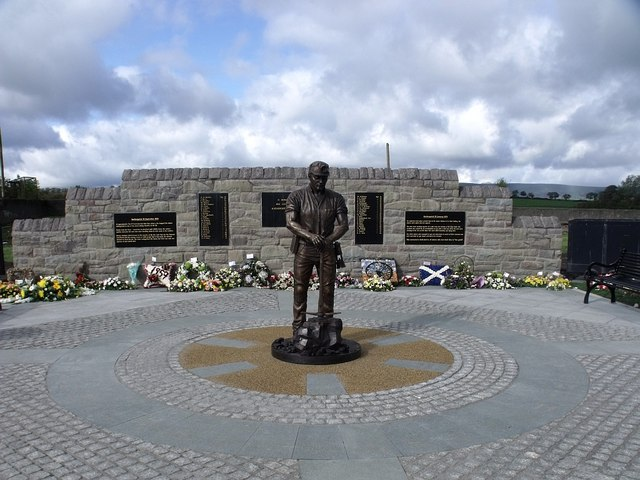
The Auchengeich Mining Disaster Memorial

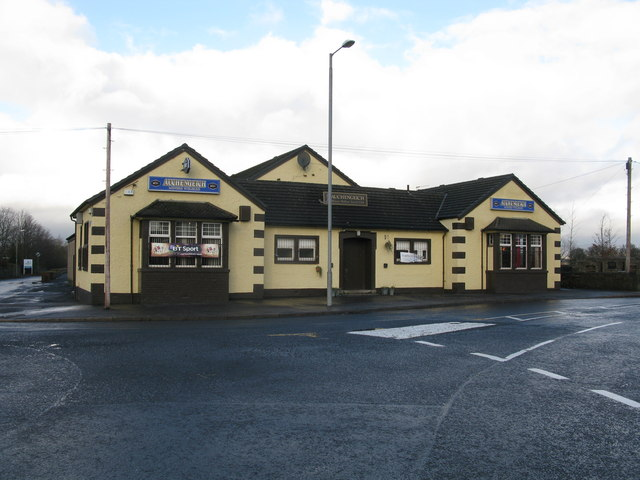
Auchengeich Miners Welfare Social Club

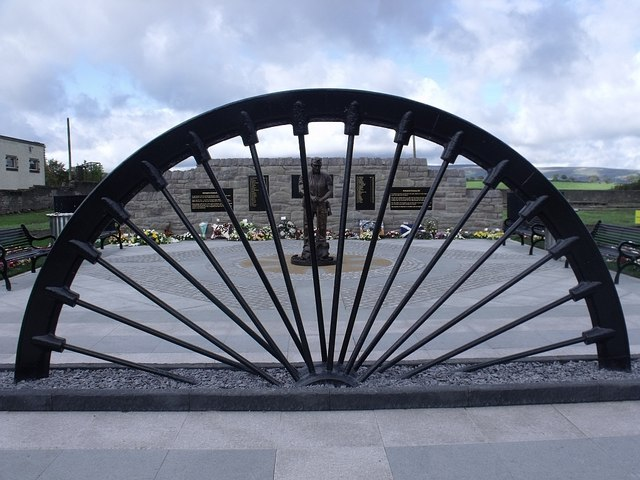
Auchengeich Memorial

Bedlay Cemetery is Moodiesburn's local cemetery. The nearby Bedlay Castle has stood since the late 16th century.

The village includes a community centre and library, a miners' welfare club (the Auchengeich Miners Welfare), a multi-denominational school (Glenmanor Primary, affiliated to Chryston High School), a Roman Catholic denominational school (St Michael's Primary, affiliated to St. Maurice's High School in Cumbernauld), a Church of Scotland parish church, a Roman Catholic church, and an independent evangelical church called New Beginnings. There is also the Silver Larch public house, a Knights of Saint Columba social club and a coffee shop called The Coffee House.

Although the oldest buildings and the original hamlet stood at the junction of Cumbernauld Road (A80) and Stoneyetts Road, its centre moved about 300 yards (270 m) north during the mid-20th century with the construction of a small development of timber-panelled homes and then expanded from there across the subsequent decades. The community's 1950s council housing is known as "Old Moodiesburn", though a substantial number of those homes are now privately owned. A batch of houses with updated facilities were constructed in the 1960s, and dubbed the "electric scheme" by locals. Modern homes have since been developed in this part of Moodiesburn, including by Taylor Woodrow, Persimmon, and Lovell. The opposite, north-eastern end, which happens to be near Devro headquarters, is composed mostly of private residences by Christian Salvesen, Tay/Wimpey, Bellway and Persimmon. Miller Homes were set to build on the former Stoneyetts Hospital site as of 2019.

A small estate of new council builds was erected in the midst of the Salvesen area in 2013.
