= SARIA =

Company

SARIA SE & Co. KG
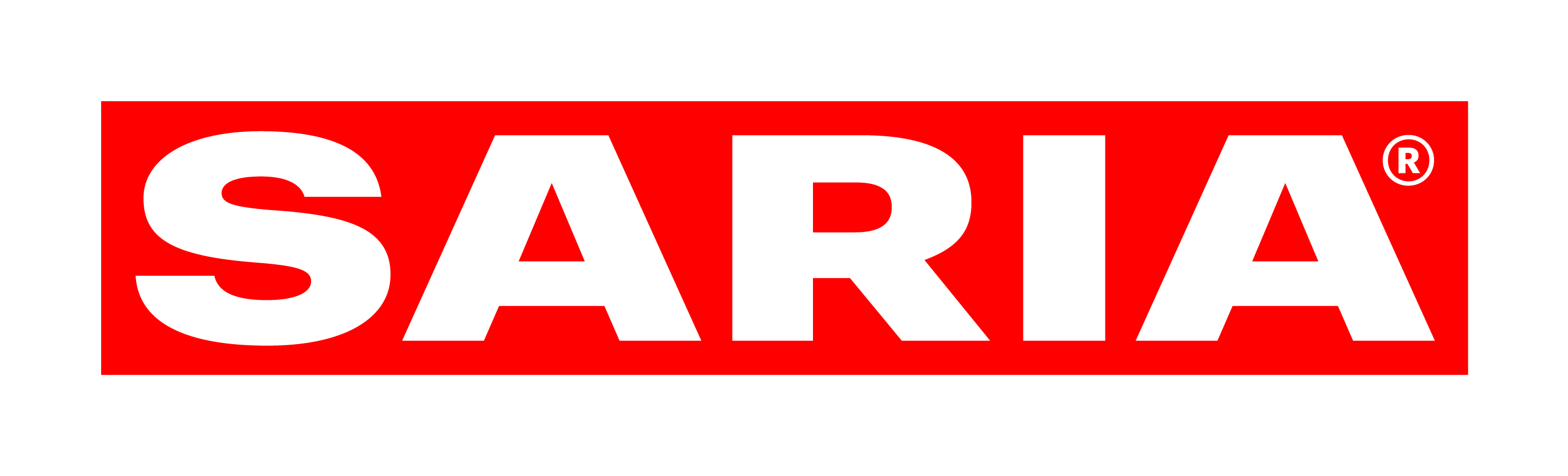
- Company type: SE & Co. KG
- Industry: Service provider
- Founded: 1998
- Headquarters: Selm, Germany
- Area served: Worldwide
- Key people: Lars Krause-Kjær, Nicolas Rottmann, Egbert Bernsmeister, Tim Schwencke, Franz-Bernhard Thier, Harald van Boxtel
- Revenue: 3,3 Mrd. EUR (2024)
- Number of employees: 13,000 (2024)
- Website: SARIA

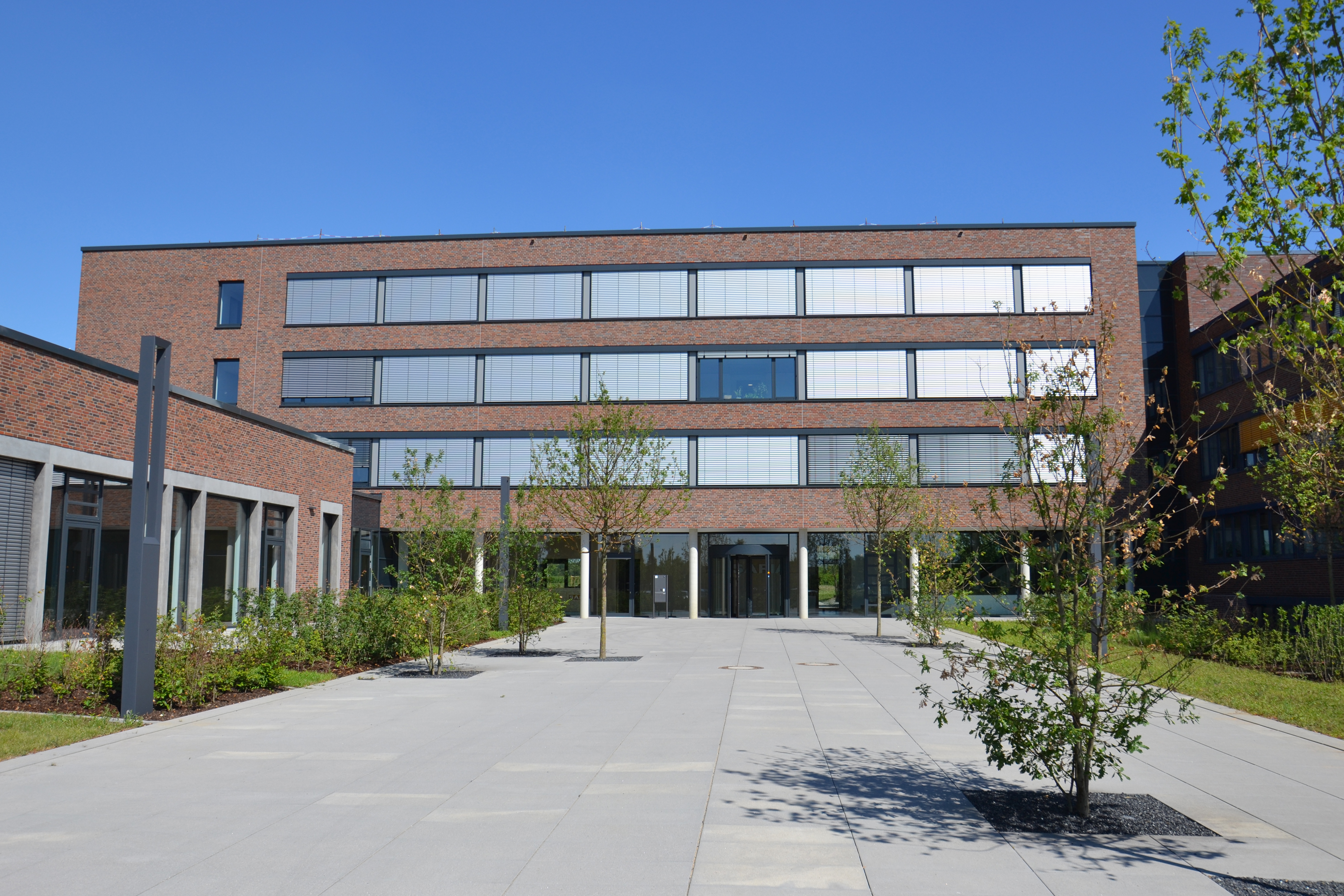
SARIA-Headquarter Selm

Saria SE & Co. KG (written as SARIA) is a family-run international group of companies with over 200 locations in 26 countries and 13,000 employees. The SARIA Group is headquartered in Selm.

== Description ==
With various activities and subsidiaries, the group of companies is active in agriculture, animal feed, food, and pharmaceutical industries as a service provider and manufacturer of quality products.

The group's main activities focus on the collection and processing of organic waste and animal by-products. In this way, the group has been contributing to the circular economy for decades.

SARIA is part of the RETHMANN Group.

== History ==
RETHMANN first became active in the field of recycling animal by-products when it took over the firm "Gebr. Schaap" in Marl, Germany in 1977. SARIA Bio-Industries AG & Co. KG was then founded in 1998 as an independent division of the RETHMANN Group. The new company united all of the Group's activities within the product and service segments that had previously been run by a number of companies including RETHMANN TBA GmbH & Co. KG.

Processing plants were already being operated at the time of the company's foundation in:

- Germany (7 plants)
- Austria (1 plant)
- Czech Republic (1 plant)
- France (10 plants, previously Soporga and SFM)
- Spain (1 plant)
- Poland (1 plant)

Since 1998, the company has been steadily growing in size by expanding into new areas, extending existing processing plants, and by taking over existing companies operating in the same sector of business. The company now operates approximately 200 sites which are located in 26 countries worldwide. A milestone in the company's history was, for example, when it put Germany's first ever plant into operation in 2001 to produce biodiesel from animal fat. This plant is located in Malchin, Germany. Further plants have followed, with vegetable oils now also being used to produce biofuels.

== De Mulder Group Acquisition ==
In 2011 the group acquired a controlling 51% interest in Prosper De Mulder Group, the UK's largest company associated with animal by-products. Members of the founder's family controlled the remaining share. In February 2016, SARIA purchased the remaining 49% of shares from the De Mulder Family.
