= St Cyprian's Church, Lenzie =

Coordinates: 55.9280°N 4.1570°W

St Cyprian's, Lenzie
- St Cyprian's in 2016
- St Cyprian's, Lenzie
- Denomination: Scottish Episcopal

History
- Status: Active

Architecture
- Heritage designation: Grade B
- Designated: 2 May 1984
- Architect: Alexander Ross
- Completed: 1873
- Construction cost: £2600

Specifications
- Materials: brick

Administration
- Parish: Cadder

St Cyprian's Church is an episcopal church in Beech road, Lenzie, East Dunbartonshire, Scotland. It was built in 1873 by Alexander Ross of Inverness and cost around £2600. The Church has been a category B listed building since 1984.

In October 2010 the church held a pet blessing service which was the first of its kind in East Dunbartonshire, the pet service has since become an annual event.

== Rectors ==
- Rev. Francis Patrick Flemyng, LL.D. 1872 to 1874
- Rev. Lionel William.Stanton, B.A. 1874 to 1876
- Rev. Henry Williams Kirby 1876 to 1911
- Rev. James Caughey Wilson 1912 to 1915
- Rev. Canon William Collins 1915 to 1954
- Rev. Canon Thomas Kindon Kay 1955 to 1965
- Rev. Douglas Wyndham Haling Grant, M.A 1965 to 1969
- Rev. Joseph Roderick McLellan, B.D. 1970 to 1978
- Rev. Harry Keith Tredgill 1978 to 1986
- Rev. John Edward Scott 1986 to 1989
- Rev. Kenneth James Shaw 1990 to ?
- Rev. John Marsburg ? to 2005
- Rev. Geoff Scobie 2006 to 2009
- Rev. Les Ireland 2012 to present
