= Chryston High School =

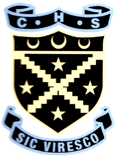

Location
- Lindsaybeg Road; Chryston; North Lanarkshire, G69 9DL; Scotland; 55.90365°N 4.10526°W

Information
- Type: Secondary school
- Motto: Sic Viresco
- Authority: North Lanarkshire Council
- Head Teacher: Gregg Orrock
- Gender: Mixed
- Enrollment: 791 in 2017
- Houses: Clyde; Forth; Kelvin
- Website: http://blogs.glowscotland.org.uk/nl/chrystonhigh

Chryston High School is a six-year non-denominational secondary school situated in Chryston, North Lanarkshire, Scotland.

The school plays an important role in the community with the students assisting with local authorities. The school was awarded the Charter Mark in September 2007, for excellence in customer service.

== Academic Standards ==
HM Inspectorate of Education, in their inspection in 2013, judged that the learning environment and support for the students was very good. The overall quality of attainment S1 to S6 was rated as 'Good', with particular strengths noted in pupil motivation and in the caring, inclusive environment.

== New building ==
Construction of the new £22 million Chryston High School building started in 2010 and was completed in mid-2012, with education commencing on 20 August 2012. The development was carried out by Morgan Sindall and was part of The Chryston High's £250 million Schools and Centres 21 programme. The new building was constructed on the playing fields of the previous site and features 23 classrooms and 27 practical rooms - this also includes facilities for vocational courses. A fitness studio, four-court games hall and five changing rooms also feature in the new school building. A full sized all-weather floodlit pitch was built on the existing Chryston High School site - this was completed around Easter 2013.

=== Old building ===
The original school building was opened in 1966 and a large extension was added in 1981.

== The Real Schools Variety Show ==
Chryston High School took part in Real Radio's "Real Variety Show", a talent show, on 11 September 2001. The school was selected as one of the 12 schools across Central Scotland to take part, out of an initial list of over 200 schools. The show was hosted by Steve McKenna, a DJ for Real Radio. Dance group "Annihilation" emerged winners after the decision made by 3 judges which the school had invited. "Annihilation" competed against the winners of the other 11 schools in which took place on the Real Radio website, and won. The winners, "Annihilation" were scheduled to perform at the Pavilion Theatre on Friday 25 September 2009 along with the likes of: MacDonald Brothers, Aftermath Street Dance Kru, Red Hot Chilli Pipers, impressionist Lewis MacLeod and the cast of Kylie Mania but contractual difficulties prevented this. Instead, the dance group performed at the Strathclyde Park Fireworks Display in Glasgow on 5 November 2009.

== Controversies ==
In 2002 the senior janitor at the school was suspended over allegations he downloaded pornography using a school computer.

In 2006, a 16-year-old female pupil pleaded guilty to dealing cannabis at the school, and was issued with an electronic tag.

In 2007 parents expressed anger after pupils were sent home alone in the middle of the night after problems with a school trip. Four members of staff and about 45 students had been stranded at the school when a bus booked to take a trip to Alton Towers had not turned up.

== Notable former pupils ==
- Craig Beattie, footballer with Edinburgh City, and formerly with Celtic and Swansea City
