= Woodilee Hospital =

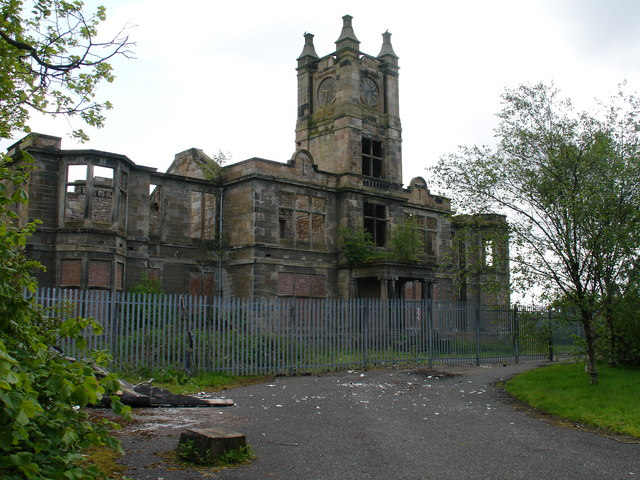
- The derelict central building in 2007

- Location of the hospital in East Dunbartonshire

Geography
- Location: Lenzie, East Dunbartonshire, Scotland
- Coordinates: 55.9289°N 4.1404°W

Organisation
- Care system: NHS
- Type: Psychiatric hospital, teaching hospital
- Affiliated university: University of Glasgow

Services
- Beds: 1,250

History
- Founded: 22 October 1875
- Closed: 2000

Links
- Lists: Hospitals in Scotland

Woodilee Hospital was a psychiatric institution situated in Lenzie, East Dunbartonshire, Scotland.

== History ==
=== Early years ===
In 1869 the Parochial Board of the Barony Parish of Glasgow set up a special committee, under Andrew Menzies of Balornock, to examine the problem of the provision of asylums in Glasgow. The Board of Lunacy favoured asylums in the countryside that offered a peaceful refuge from a hostile world for vulnerable people and gave them opportunities for employment and activity. It was a radical idea which no other Parochial Board had tried, and so before the committee could consider it they first had to clarify the law. After resolving that they could legally build a separate asylum for "pauper lunatics", a site was chosen at the junction of Woodilee estate and Lenzie Junction on the Glasgow to Edinburgh railway. It extended to 167 acres (68 hectares), larger than the Board wanted, but at £58 per acre (£140 per hectare) it was cheaper than any other site. The site was acquired in March 1871.

Seven architects tendered for the contract and James Salmon, Sons and Ritchie of West George Street in Glasgow were appointed. By the autumn the plans were approved and the main contractor, James Grant Jnr and his sub-contractors were engaged. Work was formally started in November 1871 when Andrew Menzies cut the first sod. A railway siding to bring building materials, and later to supply the finished hospital, was laid into the site from the adjacent line. It was completed in time for the ceremony to lay the foundation stone on 4 October 1872, when a special train brought the guests out from Glasgow to a temporary platform erected specially for the occasion.

The first patients were moved into Woodilee on 16 September 1875 and a month later, on 22 October 1875 the new "Woodilee Lunatic Pauper Asylum" was officially opened.

=== Expansion ===
The patients coming from other institutions found a vastly different culture at Woodilee. Under the pioneering influence of the first Medical Superintendent, Dr James Rutherford, doors were not locked and instead of prison-like wards, chemical and physical restraints, patients were given work to do. There were a variety of activities ranging from craft and hand work to physical work in the grounds, wards, laundry or on the farms servicing the hospital. After their exertions the patients could wander freely in the grounds. Woodilee was the first institution of its kind to be built without "airing courts," the open air courtyards for exercise within a building still found in prisons.

Glasgow had been growing steadily up to the 1870s and the years that followed saw a more rapid expansion in the city's industrial development and with it, a population explosion. The numbers of mentally ill grew in proportion and the years between the asylum's opening and the outbreak of the First World War were ones of almost continuous building and rebuilding on the site. Each new development created vacant space, but no sooner was it available than a seemingly inexhaustible supply of new patients filled it up, a problem compounded by changing social attitudes and a growing tendency for people to hustle elderly relatives into asylums. By the 1880s it was licensed for 600 patients.

Forty years after the asylum opened it had expanded from 400 beds to 1300. With such a massive increase, and costs rising in proportion, the heady days of innovation gave way to a regime shackled by everyday chores and, in line with practice at other Scottish asylums, the open doors policy was gradually abandoned. The status of the asylum was changing too. The legal and statutory framework which governed them also changed. Barony and City Parishes became separate Lunacy Districts in 1887, with the responsibility to provide care for mentally ill people in their areas. Barony was already doing this at Woodilee but city Parish, which earlier turned down an offer to build Woodilee as a joint venture, had to build a new asylum at Gartloch. It was opened in 1897. A year later the two Parish Councils were amalgamated and the two asylums came under the control of a new Glasgow District Lunacy Board.

The hospital continued to function through the First World War but, as the conflict dragged on, patients from other hospitals were moved to Woodilee to vacate space for wounded servicemen. Overcrowding became a serious problem, made worse by a government embargo that stopped all building work. Throughout the 1920s the numbers of elderly patients grew and the small ‘hospital’ wards were placed under severe strain. Clinical rooms were added to them and more space was created by erecting veranda wards and adapting day rooms and other wards, but the lack of ‘hospital’ space was a constant concern. In 1929, the Local Government Act swept away the old Poor Law provisions and much of the old terminology. The Act also transferred control to Glasgow Corporation Public Health Department. The Asylum was now a mental hospital.

A period of redevelopment and rebuilding followed, bathrooms and ward kitchens were upgraded and the nurses’ home extended.

Physician Superintendent Dr Henry Carr, who had maintained the standard of care, retired in December 1936 and was replaced by Dr John Robb. He was interested in the law as it related to mental illness and favoured a system of custodial care which kept patients in locked wards and restricted exercise to accompanied walks or the confines of enclosures.

=== National Health Service ===
With the creation of the National Health Service in 1948, the hospital was linked with the local Gartloch and Stoneyetts hospitals under the Board of Management for Glasgow North Eastern Mental Hospitals, part of the Western Regional Hospital Board. It was zoned with a catchment area of Northern Glasgow. Furniture was improved, but outwardly little changed until a new Physician Superintendent, William Cramond, arrived in 1955. Just before his appointment the drug chlorpromazine (or Largactil) had been introduced for the treatment of mental illness and Dr Cramond’s application of it at Woodilee, along with other reforms, was to have a profound effect on the hospital. Bed-ridden patients became ambulant and those with long term illness started to improve.

The reforms in mental health care in the 1950s were not confined to Woodilee and a decade of change was capped by the Mental Health (Scotland) Act of 1960 which superseded all of the old legislation. It also replaced the Board of Control with a Mental Welfare Commission. Further, more profound, change was signalled in a speech to the 1961 annual conference of the National Association for Mental Health by the then Minister of Health, Enoch Powell. He suggested that the new drug regimes and consequent falling patient numbers would mean that within fifteen years only half the beds available at that time would be needed.

=== Closure ===
On 13 March 1987 ("Black Friday" to many at the hospital), severe structural defects in the fabric of the buildings were discovered, leading to evacuation of a large part of the hospital; many of the evacuated patients were transferred to Stoneyetts Hospital in Moodiesburn. Many of the patients at Stoneyetts were transferred to Woodilee when that hospital closed in 1992, and Woodilee itself closed in 2000.
