= Lenzie Academy =

Comprehensive school in Lenzie, Scotland

- Acadamaidh Lenzie (Scottish Gaelic)

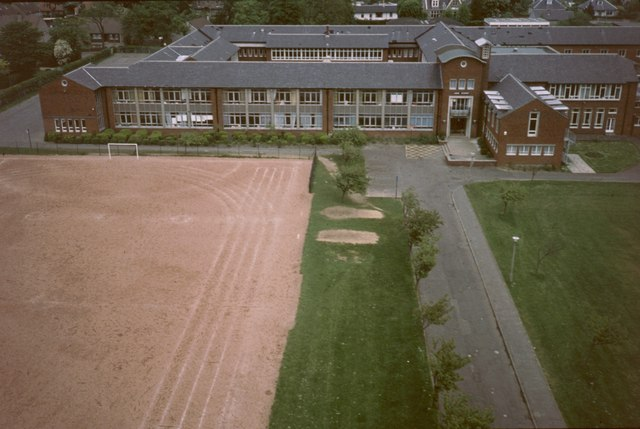

Location
- Myrtle Avenue, Lenzie; Glasgow, Greater Glasgow, G664HR; Scotland

Information
- Type: Comprehensive school
- Motto: Ditior Quia Doctior (Richer through learning)
- Established: 1886
- School district: East Dunbartonshire
- Head Teacher: Vicki Rice
- Faculty: 101
- Grades: S1 to S6
- Enrollment: 1,158 in 2017
- Yearbook: Lenzie Academy Yearbook
- Affiliations: Auchinloch Primary School; Lairdsland Primary School; Lenzie Meadow Primary School; Millersneuk Primary School
- Website: lenzieacademy.e-dunbarton.sch.uk

Lenzie Academy is a co-educational comprehensive secondary school located in Lenzie, East Dunbartonshire, Scotland. The catchment area covers Lenzie, Auchinloch and the southern parts of Kirkintilloch.

== History ==
In 2001, the suicide of Nicola Ann Raphael, a pupil at Lenzie Academy, was covered by the press.

In June 2020, East Dunbartonshire Council investigated a tweet from the school's physics department social media account that criticised taking the knee. Amy Callaghan said she had contacted the council and headteacher about the post.

== Governance ==
The school is managed by the senior management team, composed of the Head Teacher and six Deputy Head Teachers, each in charge of a year group.

== School structure ==
The most recently reported school roll is 1296, taught by a teaching staff of 101. The S1 intake cap is 240, based on an average annual first year intake of eight classes of approximately thirty pupils each, mostly coming from four associated primary schools, namely Auchinloch, Millersneuk, Lairdsland and Lenzie Meadow Primary. Approximately 40% of the total roll is from outside the catchment area, attending as placing requests. The S1 rolls have slightly reduced in recent years, and in early 2012, the reported 2012/2013 intake was 226 pupils, consisting of 125 from the zoned area and 101 through placing requests. The total school roll has been falling every year for the last 8 years, with the 2011/2012 figure being 25 pupils lower than the previous year's 1321 pupils.

=== Table ===
School year	School roll	S1 intake	S2	S3	S4	S5	S6	Placing requests	Sources
2004/2005	1,431	236	258	256	250	242	189		
2005/2006	1,387	237	238	260	253	227	172	122	
2006/2007	1,380	235	237	240	262	242	164		
2007/2008	1,362	239	232	240	236	244	171		
2008/2009	1,358	238	238	238	242	215	187		
2009/2010	1,334	235	237	238	233	217	174	109	
2010/2011	1,321	204	232	229	235	221	200	92	
2011/2012	1,296							103	
2012/2013	1,269	220	212	212	232	204	189	102	
2013/2014	1,238								
2014/2015	1,231								
2015/2016									
2016/2017	1,167	184	217	191	190	222	163		
2017/2018	1,158	199	186	216	191	175	191		

== Campus ==
The current red brick Academy building was built in 1960, and extensions have been added over the years. The original school building dating from when the Academy was founded in 1886 has since served as Lenzie Primary school. More than 110 years after opening, the school admitted its first physically disabled student in 1996, which meant the school had to install a lift and ramps to make the whole building accessible.

== Awards and recognition ==
=== Academic rankings ===
In 2014, the school was ranked 13th in STV's league table of Scottish state schools. This builds upon the 19th position achieved in 2013 and the 16th position achieved in 2012 based on the percentage of pupils obtaining five or more Highers at bands A-C.

== Notable alumni ==
- Moira Anderson (born 1938), singer
- Andrew Baker (born 1965), High Court judge
- Martin Creed (born 1968), Turner Prize-winning artist
- Rona Dougall, Scotland Tonight presenter, broadcast journalist
- Jane Duncan (1910–1976), author (known by her legal name of Elizabeth Jane Cameron while a pupil)
- Andy Dunlop (born 1972), Travis guitarist
- Alasdair Graham (1934–2016), Scottish concert pianist.
- Andrew Henderson (born 1980), Scottish rugby union footballer.
- Tom Johnston (1882–1965), Secretary of State for Scotland during the Second World War in Churchill's cabinet
- Jimmy Mack (1934–2004), broadcaster
- Gus MacPherson (born 1968), footballer.
- Ian McCartney (born 1951), former MP, chairman of the Labour Party and member of Tony Blair's cabinet He left the school at the age of 15 "under a bit of a cloud" without any qualifications or school prizes.
- Rhona McLeod (born 1966), news reader.
- Nicola Raphael (1985–2001) – a pupil whose suicide and preceding bullying at the school led to press coverage and later legal action.
- Michael Shea (1938–2009), Press Secretary to Queen Elizabeth II (1978–1987) He left the Academy after winning a scholarship to Gordonstoun at the age of 14.
- Billy Williamson (1922–2006), footballer, later a PE teacher at the school.

== Former headteachers ==
Lenzie Academy has had eleven head teachers. For 125 years until 2011, the head teacher was referred to as Rector.

	Head Teacher	Start of office	End of office	Duration (years)	Sources
1.	Alexander Buchanan M.A.	1886	1919	33	
2.	Peter Dawson	1919	1923	4	
3.	George Murray	1923	1935	12	
4.	Charles Farquharson	1935	1946	11	
5.	John Kerr	1946	1950	4	
6.	George Young	1950	1965	15	
7.	James Hamilton	1965	1977	12	
8.	Colin M. Brown	1978	1997	19	
9.	Roderick J. McLelland	1997	2011	14	
10.	Brian Paterson	2011	2026	15	
11.	Vicki Rice	As of 2026			

== See also ==
- List of places in East Dunbartonshire
- List of places in Scotland
- Category:People educated at Lenzie Academy
