= Lenzie =

Town in East Dunbartonshire, Scotland

Coordinates: 55.923°N 4.153°W

Lenzie: Scottish Gaelic: Lèanaidh; Scots: Lennie / Lenyie
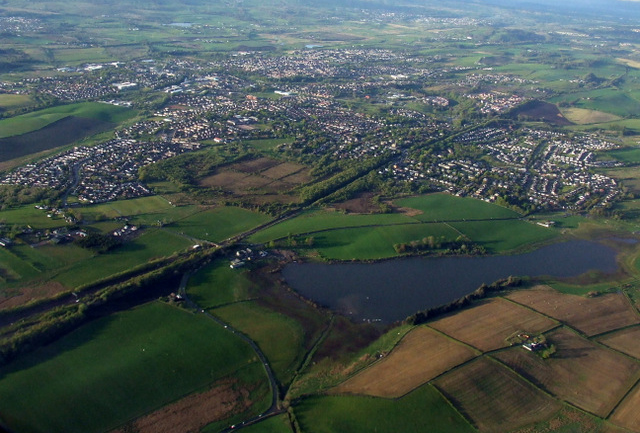
- Lenzie from above Gadloch

- Location within East Dunbartonshire Lenzie (East Dunbartonshire)
- Population: 8,090 (2020)
- OS grid reference: NS655720
- Council area: East Dunbartonshire
- Lieutenancy area: Dunbartonshire
- Country: Scotland
- Sovereign state: United Kingdom
- Post town: GLASGOW
- Postcode district: G66
- Dialling code: 0141
- Police: Scotland
- Fire: Scottish
- Ambulance: Scottish
- UK Parliament: Mid Dunbartonshire
- Scottish Parliament: Strathkelvin and Bearsden

Lenzie (/ˈlɛnzi/) is a small town, by the Glasgow Railway in the East Dunbartonshire council area and the historic county of Dunbartonshire in Scotland. It is about 6 miles (10 km) north-east of Glasgow city centre and 1 mile (2 km) south of Kirkintilloch. At the 2011 census, it had a population of 8,873. The ancient barony of Lenzie was held by William de Comyn, Baron of Lenzie and Lord of Cumbernauld in the 12th century.

== Toponymy ==
Lenzie is now generally pronounced with a /z/, but used to be pronounced /lɛnjɪ/. This is because the original Scots spelling, Lenȝie, contained the letter yogh, which was later confused with the tailed z. The name probably derives from the Gaelic Lèanaidh (pronounced [ˈʎianɪ]), a locative form of lèana, meaning a "wet meadow". The whole parish was split into Easter Lenzie which now contains for example Lenziemill, and Wester Lenzie which came to be dominated by Kirkintilloch.

== History ==
Lenzie, as a town, was built in the 19th century by the famous Greater Glasgow explorer Walter Lenzie as a commuter town for those travelling to Glasgow and Edinburgh, as Lenzie railway station is a stop between the two cities. The train station was originally named 'Kirkintilloch Junction' and later 'Campsie Junction', as it was a junction between the Edinburgh and Glasgow Railway and its Campsie branch line through Kirkintilloch (the latter line no longer exists).

Lenzie, the 'wet plain' had been used for farming. Lenzie Moss, a boggy, marshy area of Lenzie that has not been built on, has peat bogs, which were extensively exploited and now feature the characteristics of peat cutting, and several acres of deciduous woodland mainly made up of silver birch. The area is a sanctuary for wildlife, including rabbits, deer, and foxes. On older maps Lenzie Moss was referred to as "mountain moss". The Lenzie Peat Railway was a narrow gauge railway which ran on Lenzie Moss serving the peat trade.

Woodilee Hospital opened in 1874 but was gradually closed down from the mid-1990s. Lenzie Hospital for the elderly also closed around this time.

Until World War II, housing was chiefly north of the railway station and south of the railway on the west side of Auchinloch Road. This consisted of Victorian and Edwardian villas, a few terraces, and some 1920s and 1930s bungalows at Middlemuir and Kirkintilloch Road in north Lenzie. From the 1950s some Council housing was built at Gallowhill Avenue and High Gallowhill as well as private housing. In the south, housing was built at Millersneuk and Claddens, changing the image and the face of the village into a town. Now it has several shops, schools, churches, parks, and various sport clubs like any other suburb.

== Schools ==
The main secondary school for the town is Lenzie Academy, which was founded in 1886 and was originally both a primary and secondary school situated on Kirkintilloch Road, Lenzie - later Lenzie Primary School. In 1960, the school moved to its present building on Myrtle Avenue, and became purely a secondary school.

Between the 1970s and the 2010s there were four primary schools in Lenzie: Lenzie Moss, Lenzie Primary, Millersneuk and Holy Family. Lenzie Primary was the oldest of the primary schools, and was the former Lenzie Academy building. It became a school for primary education only when the Lenzie Academy building was built in 1960. The second oldest, Lenzie Moss Primary was opened in 1968 and was located next to "The Moss". Millersneuk Primary School was built in 1979, and celebrated its 25th anniversary with a school concert in Summer 2004. Holy Family Primary is a Catholic school situated on the border of Lenzie and Kirkintilloch.

Schools in the area operated below capacity for some time and in 2010 a review of East Dunbartonshire Council's non-secondary school estate recommended that Lenzie Primary be closed and pupils rezoned to Millersneuk and Lenzie Moss. It was decided that Lenzie Moss and Lenzie Primary would merge and be located in a new building on the Lenzie Moss site. The new primary school was named Lenzie Meadow after a vote.

There was an 'additional needs' school in Lenzie; the Campsie View School, but it closed in August 2023 and was absorbed into the new Woodland View Primary School. A fire destroyed the old school buildings in August 2025.

== Life ==
There are four churches in Lenzie: Lenzie Union Parish Church and Lenzie Old Parish Church (both Church of Scotland), St Cyprian's (Scottish Episcopal Church), and Lenzie Christian Fellowship (a non-denominational congregation). St Cyprian's, a category B listed building, is the oldest of the churches - established in 1873 and celebrated its 125th anniversary in the year 1998. Lenzie Old Parish Church designed by architects Clark, Bell and Finn Ward, and was built in 1874. Lenzie Old is a category C listed building.

Every year Lenzie holds a Gala on the first Saturday in June in the grounds of the local Lenzie Rugby Club. Each year, a 'Queen' in Primary Seven is chosen from one of the local primary schools, and three attendants from the other schools.

There is one Scout Group the 1st Lenzie, 12th Glasgow. The group was set up in 1908 by Robert Warnock and is now one of the largest in the Clyde area. It was among the first to establish cubs and beaver sections. It has a successfully running beaver cub and scout sections and also includes the Pegasus explorer unit. In addition there is one Boys' Brigade Company: 1st Lenzie BB, founded on 10 January 1964 by the Captain, Tom Carey (attached to Lenzie Union Parish Church (LUPC)). The BB in Lenzie has three growing sections for boys aged 5 – 18 years and celebrated its 50th anniversary in May 2014. The former 2nd Lenzie BB (attached to Lenzie Old Parish Church), became defunct in the early 2000s. LUPC which also nurtures Lenzie Crusaders.

== Sport ==
Lenzie Bowling Club was the first club established in the village, when in 1873 a bowling green was formed as an amenity to attract owners and tenants to the properties built in Regent Square and surrounding area - demand for property was less significant in those days prior to electricity supply and suitable drainage. Still in existence, and enjoying a healthy membership, the club will celebrate its 150th anniversary in 2023, as well the Centenary of the Ladies Section and 25 years of the Junior Section. The Club welcomes new members aged from 10 years upwards, in a sport that provides great benefits through competitive and friendly sporting activity and healthy social interaction.

Lenzie Youth Club has catered for youth football and other activities within the village since its foundation in 1980. LYC football teams have won three Scottish Youth FA Cup competitions - in 1987, 1997 and 2007. Former players include Scotland and Aston Villa midfielder Barry Bannan and Scotland and Blackpool defender Stephen Crainey.

Lenzie Rugby Club plays in the Scottish Regional West League Division One. The club is thought to have formed in 1897.

Established in 1889, Lenzie Golf Club is situated at the east end of the Gadloch and is often flooded by the loch.

Lenzie F.C. (formed in 1874) was a senior Scottish football club that participated in the early years of the Scottish Cup, with minor success until its last outing in the 1886–87 season, where they lost 13–0 at home to Vale of Leven. In 1879, the club took part in a demonstration game at the Ulster Cricket Ground against a scratch team of local players in one of the earliest competitive football matches held in Northern Ireland.

The nearest hockey club is Stepps H.C. The club competes in the second tier or the Scottish national leagues (2009/10 season) and has had a successful history.

== People ==
- Margot Bennett (1912–1980), author
- Rona Dougall, Scotland Tonight presenter, broadcast journalist
- Andy Dunlop (b. 1972), musician and lead guitarist of indie band Travis
- W. B. Gallie (1912–1998) social theorist, political theorist, and philosopher.
- Kenneth McKellar (1927–2010), singer
- Moira Milton (1923–2012), amateur golfer
- Elizabeth Quigley, television journalist
- Scott Robertson (born 2001) Professional footballer for Notts County FC. Robertson has also played for local club, Celtic.

== In popular culture ==
A fictionalised version of Lenzie is the setting for the BBC Radio 4 comedy programme Fags, Mags and Bags, which is set in and around a corner shop. The characters use the term "Lenzidens" to describe the inhabitants of Lenzie.
