= Fidget pie =

Cured pork and apple pie

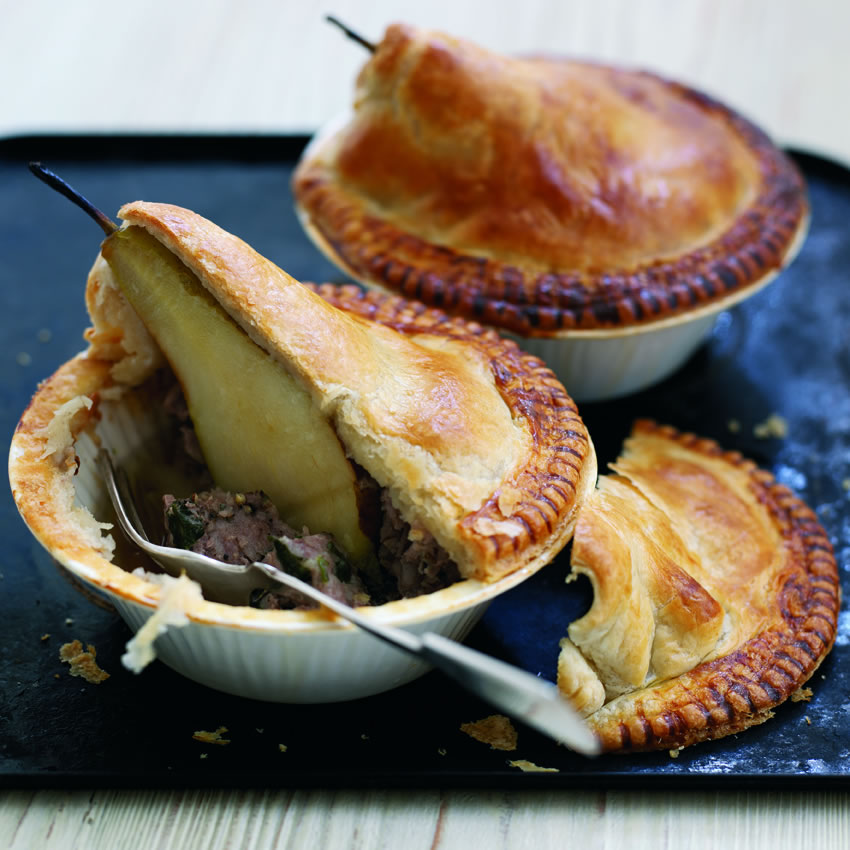
A version of fidget pie made with pears instead of apples

A fidget pie (alternatively fitchett or figet) is an English pie containing layers of apple, cured pork (typically bacon), onion, and sometimes potato under a crimped, shortcrust pastry top. The pie is particularly popular in Shropshire, a county in the West Midlands, where it is made with sugar and sweet spices. Other regions have their own versions, including ingredients such as sage or sultanas.

The name's origins are contested, although several theories identify "fidget" as derived from "fitchet(t)" an obsolete dialectal term for the polecat. The first reference to the pie identified by the Oxford English Dictionary was made in 1790, although pork and apple had been combined in pies since the pork pie first emerged earlier in the century. Since its first mention, the pie has been associated with the harvest, served to workers in the field.

== Name ==
"Fidget" in the pie's name does not reference restless motion. Lexicographer John Ayto identifies fidget as derived from fitchet(t), an obsolete, regional name for the polecat. Sources vary on what this link to the polecat may represent; culinary experts Laura Mason and Catherine Brown note the pie's reputation at times for smelling unpleasant during baking, while Ayto notes that fitchet was often used in reference to the colour of the animal, and may be intended to reference the colouration of a burnt pie. Departing from theories that its name references the polecat, researcher Lizzie Boyd suggests that "fidget" may derive from "fitched", originally meaning "five-sided", in reference to an early shape the pie was made in.

== Description ==
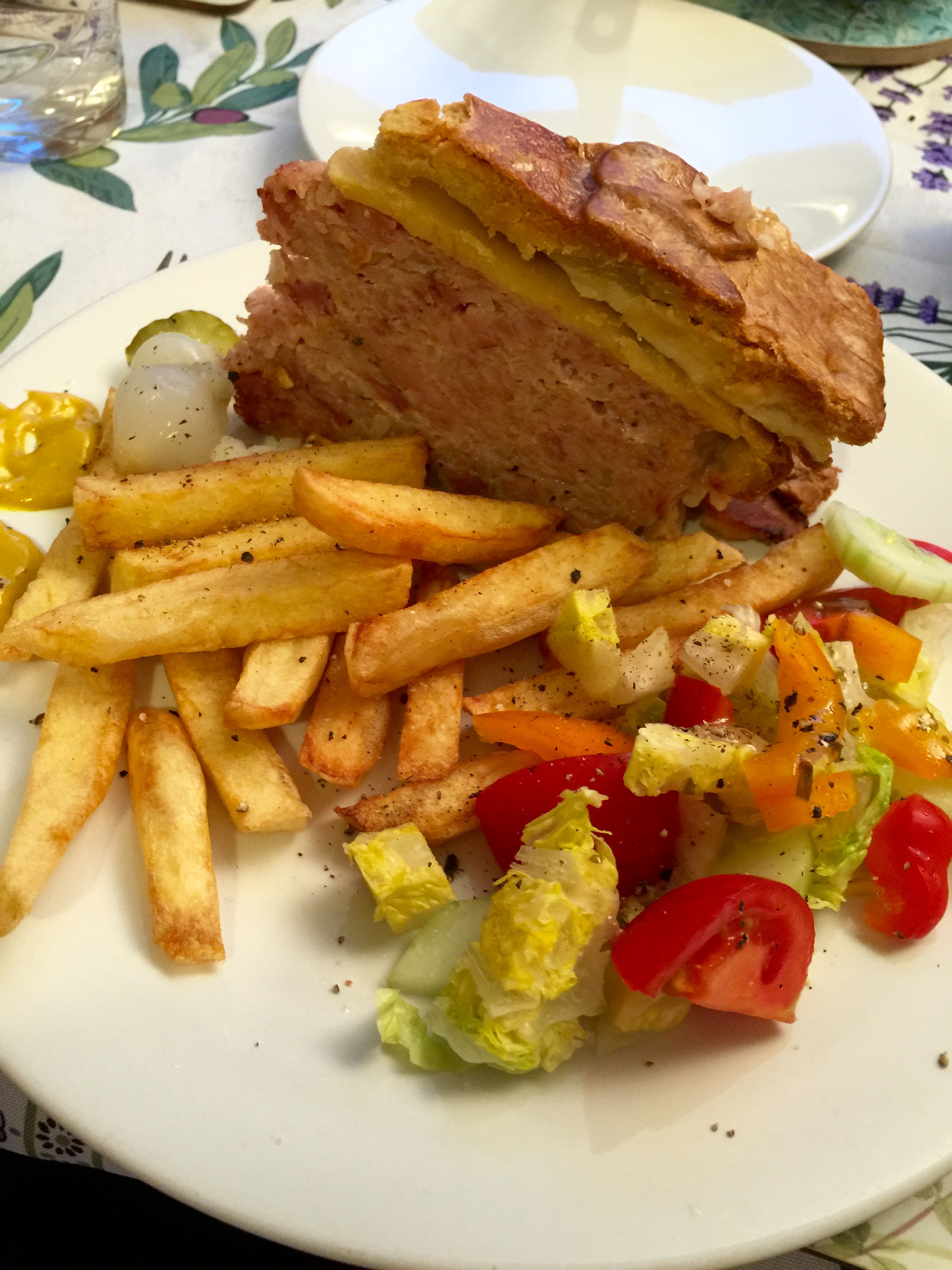
Fidget pie with chips and salad

A fidget pie contains apple, cured pork (typically bacon) and onion under a crimped, shortcrust pastry top. In some preparations, pastry surrounds the entire pie to create a portable, raised pie that can be sold to the public. The ingredients are often arranged in layers, with the pink gammon, bacon, or cured pork layer contributing the dominant flavour. Potato is sometimes included, layered with the apples and onions, balancing the flavour of the cured pork with a less intense sweetness. Salt and pepper are used as seasonings; wine and stock are also typically added. In more upscale preparations, cider and nutmeg may be included.

Regional versions vary slightly, all retaining the cured pork and apple elements. In Shropshire, where the pie is particularly prominent, sugar and sweet spices are added. Cheshire preparations also include sugar, along with sage, while Derbyshire versions include sultanas. Fidget pies prepared in Huntingdon, Cambridgeshire, lack the additions of other regions, though their filling is prepared to have a thicker consistency. In restaurants, modifications may extend further—at Bubby's in Manhattan, for instance, fidget pies have included Roquefort, honey and thyme. The mixture of meat and apples is also seen in the Devonshire squab pie, a dish that emerged in the 17th century.

Culinary experts Laura Mason and Catherine Brown describe a typical fidget pie as made to the following specifications: "about 18cm diameter, 5.5cm deep, weighing 1500g... it is baked at 160-170°C for up to 90 minutes." (Note: In imperial units, about 7 inch diameter, 2.1 inches deep, weighing 3.3 pound... it is baked at 320-338°F for up to 90 minutes.)

== History ==
Pork pies emerged in the United Kingdom around the beginning of the 18th century, and from the start prominently included apples. Early evidence that they were associated with the Cheshire region is seen in Hannah Glasse's The Art of Cookery Made Plain and Easy (1747), where one of two "Cheshire pork pies" is a raised pie, that included fresh pork, sweet apples, and white wine.

The first use of fidget pie identified by the Oxford English Dictionary came in 1790 in the form "fitchet-pie". The reference, appearing in the second edition of Francis Grose's Provincial Glossary read "Fitchet-pie, a pie given in the North and in Cheshire to the reapers at harvest-home, composed of apples, onions, and the fat of bacon, in equal quantities." The association of fidget pies with harvests has persisted. In older preparations in the West Midlands, cheese was sometimes used in place of bacon. Recipes proliferated in the 20th century along with descriptions of regional variations, including praise from Dorothy Hartley for versions made around Market Harborough.

== See also ==
- List of pies, tarts and flans

== Sources ==
- Ayto, John (2002). An A to Z of Food and Drink. Oxford, Oxfordshire: Oxford University Press. ISBN 0-19-280352-2.
- Boyd, Lizzie (1988). British Cookery (2nd ed.). Bromley, Kent: Christopher Helm Publishers. ISBN 0-7470-0223-1.
- "fidget pie". Oxford English Dictionary (online ed.). Oxford University Press. doi:10.1093/OED/9844314357. (Subscription or participating institution membership required.)
- Grigson, Jane (1984) [1971]. Good Things. Lincoln, Nebraska: University of Nebraska Press. ISBN 0-8032-5971-9.
- Hughes, Glyn (2017). The Lost Foods of England. Winster, Derbyshire: Lulu Press. ISBN 978-0-244-02963-0.
- Mason, Laura; Brown, Catherine (2007). From Norfolk Knobs to Fidget Pie: Food from the Midlands and East Anglia. London: Harper Press. ISBN 978-0-00-779-841-4.
- Segnit, Niki (2010). The Flavor Thesaurus. New York and London: Bloomsbury. ISBN 978-1-60819-874-0.
