= Cider cake =

Cake incorporating cider

Cider cake is a cake made with cider, prepared through the creaming method. The cake rises as acidic cider reacts with alkaline leavening agent to form bubbles of carbon dioxide in the batter. (Note: The same effect is created in cakes using vinegar or buttermilk, with these known under names like vinegar cake and soda cake.)

Recipes for cider cake exist around cider-producing regions of New England, America, and South England, United Kingdom, from the 19th century. In both locations, cider cakes are sometimes enriched with dried fruit and spices.

== New England ==
The cider cakes of America emerged as an adaptation of soft ginger bread, swapping molasses for sugar and cider. Recipes appear through New England cookbooks of the 19th century, with the earliest preparation identified by the food historians Keith Stavely and Kathleen Fitzgerald coming in a recipe dated "Nov. 11 1801". It appears in the manuscript cookbook of Ruth Emerson, the mother of Ralph Waldo Emerson, and made a firm cake from cider, flour, sugar, butter, leavening, with currants and raisins. (Note: Stavely and Fitzgerald liken this density to tea bread or quick bread.) The first recipe to appear in a published cookbook came almost three decades later, in Lydia Maria Child's 1829 household guide The Frugal Housewife. Child's recipe closely resembled Emerson's without its dried fruits, reading: "Cider cake is very good, to be baked in small loaves. One pound and a half of flour, half a pound of sugar, quarter of a pound of butter, half a pint of cider, one teaspoonful of pearlash; (Note: Potassium carbonate, made by processing potash.) spice to your taste. Bake till it turns easily in the pans. I should think about half an hour." The simple preparation is typical of Child's ethos of frugality; Stavely and Fitzgerald describe it as "made so obviously with what was to hand."

A record from around this time, has cider cake being consumed outside of New England. It comes in the recipe book of a woman from Savannah, Georgia c. 1828-1832, making the cake by combining pearlash with cider and vinegar. Recipes continued to appear in New England over the course of the 19th century, with several moving away from the simple preparation offered by Child. One of these was offered by Catharine Beecher in 1846, with a cake that tasted both sweeter and less noticeably of cider. A recipe from Eliza Leslie went further. Her cider was not only sweeter than Child's, but also more dense and rich. It contained dried fruits, wine and brandy either alone or together (in greater amounts than the cider), and more butter.

== South England ==
In England, recipes for cider cakes invariably contain baking powder, dating the dish in the country to the mid-19th century when the leavener was created. The cake has traditionally been made in the south of the country, within the cider-producing regions of Herefordshire, Gloucestershire, Oxfordshire, and Worcestershire. Dried fruits and spices—most often nutmeg—contribute flavour for what is a rich cake with a subtle taste of cider. Writing in the mid-20th century, Elisabeth Ayrton recommended pairing cider cake with puréed apples and cream. Alternatively, she suggested eating them at a picnic, alongside apples and cider. Jane Grigson included a recipe in her 1974 work English Food. There, she recommended buttering the cake before eating.

== See also ==
- Cider doughnut

== Sources ==
- Ayrton, Elisabeth (1977) [1974]. The Cookery of England. Harmondsworth, Middlesex: Penguin Books. ISBN 0-14-046188-4.
- Frey, Valerie J (2015). Preserving Family Recipes: How to Save and Celebrate Your Food Traditions. Athens, Georgia & London: University of Georgia Press. ISBN 978-0-8203-3063-1.
- Grigson, Jane (1974). English Food. London & Basingstoke, Hampshire. ISBN 333-12513-1.
- Mason, Laura; Brown, Catherine (2006) [1999 as Traditional Foods of Britain]. The Taste of Britain. London: Harper Press. ISBN 978-0-00-724132-3.
- Mason, Laura (2014) [1999]. "Cake-making". In Davidson, Alan; Jaine, Tom (eds.). The Oxford Companion to Food (3rd ed.). Oxford, Oxfordshire and New York: Oxford University Press. ISBN 978-1-78785-552-6.
- Stavely, Keith; Fitzgerald, Kathleen (2011). Northern Hospitality: Cooking by the Book in New England. Amherst, Massachusetts: University of Massachusetts Press. ISBN 978-1-55849-860-0.
- Stavely, Keith; Fitzgerald, Kathleen (2026). Northern Comfort: The New England Baking Tradition. New York University Press. ISBN 978-1-4798-4970-3.
- Weaver, William Woys (1982). A Quaker Woman's Cookbook: The Domestic Cooking of Elizabeth Ellicott Lea. Philadelphia, Pennsylvania: University of Pennsylvania Press. ISBN 0-8122-7848-8.
