= Wigg (cake) =

Type of cake in English cuisine

A wigg is a type of bun or small cake in English cuisine. Leavened with ale or barm, they were flavored with caraway and not as sweet as modern buns.

== Name ==
Their name was sometimes spelled wig, wigg or whig. The origin of this is unclear, and may be a derivation of the Tutonic word for wedge.

== History ==
The Oxford English Dictionary records uses of the term as early as 1376 in records of the London Guildhall (cum uno pane de obolo, vocato 'wygge'). Another record dating to 1413 is known from the court rolls of Maldon, Essex: ...panis wastel pistoris de Writle in defectus xs; item, le wigg ejusdem in defectu, xs. It was defined in the Promptorium Parvulorum as "brede (P. or bunne brede)". Thomas More's 1529 Dialogue Concerning Heresies includes a reference to those who become drunk during Lent on wigs (meaning "wine-dipped buns") and cracknels (meaning biscuits): "Some wax dronk in lent of wygges & cracknels".

In Richard Surflet's translation of Charles Estienne's Maison Rustique into English it says "The workers in pastrie do use the rising of beere to make their wigs withall". Jack a Lent (1620) by John Taylor described "round halfe-penny loaues ... transformed into square wiggs, (which wigges like drunkards are drowned in their Ale)." Samuel Pepys wrote in his diary "the only Lenten supper I have had of wiggs and ale."

A simplified form of the wigg bun was distributed in Herefordshire by a farmer to his workers, with butter and eggs omitted, for dipping in a bowl of ale with cheese as a supper during the harvest. They were also served at funerals dunked in arval ale, or eaten with arval cheese. Laura Mason, writing in the 21st century was able to identify one commercial producer of wiggs continuing, appearing in the north-west of England.

== Sources ==
- Mason, Laura; Brown, Catherine (2007) [1999]. From Eccles Cake to Hawkshead Wig: a Celebration of Northern Food. London: Harper Press. ISBN 978-0-00-726788-0.
- Moss, Kay (2013). Seeking the Historical Cook: Exploring Eighteenth-Century Southern Foodways. Columbia, South Carolina: University of South Carolina Press. ISBN 978-1-61117-259-1.
