= Sassermaet =

Shetland chopped meat product

- Sassermaet being fried
- Alternative names: Saucermeat
- Course: Main course
- Region or state: Shetland
- Serving temperature: Hot
- Main ingredients: Beef or pork
- Similar dishes: Lorne sausage

Sassermaet (Shaetlan pronunciation: [ˈsasərme̞t] SASS-ər-mit) is a chopped meat product traditional to the Shetland Islands.

== Description ==
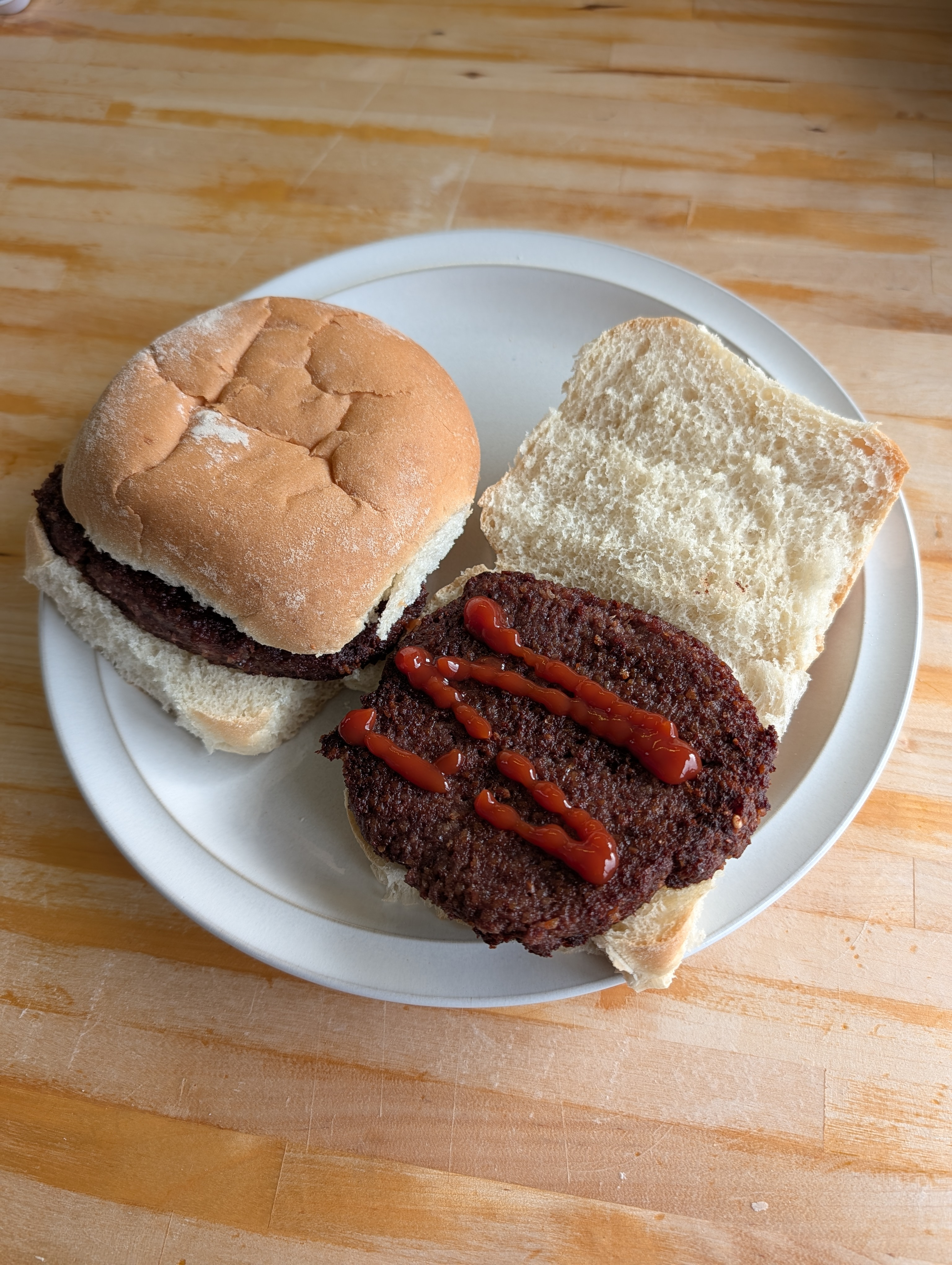
Two sassermaet rolls, one with tomato ketchup.

Sassermaet consists of a mixture of minced beef or occasionally pork, fat, rusk, salt, and spices. It may be mixed with onions and other ingredients to form patties or a meatloaf. The patties, known as brönies, are fried; the meatloaf is baked. Often, it is shaped into squares using Lorne sausage tins, producing a mass which can weigh multiple kilograms. Once shaped, butchers remove the sassermaet from its mould and let it set and harden in the refrigerator, before slicing portions for customers.

While frequently compared to Lorne sausage, Shetlanders assert that sassermaet is distinct. According to the food writers James and Tom Morton, among the Shetland population, sassermaet is regarded as a point of local pride while not being considered a fancy food, deriving from its high fat content and the simple ways butchers serve and cooks prepare it.

== History ==
In Shetland, sassermaet originated as a way to keep meat during long winters, as one of several meat preservation traditions on the islands that are linked to Shetland's historic ties to Scandinavia. Its name combines sasser, in the Shetland dialect an archaic term for "chopped", with maet, meaning food (together, "chopped food"). Through reanalysis, sassermaet has sometimes become interpreted in English as saucermeat, though this spelling is discouraged by Shaetlan language organisation I Hear Dee. In its original formulation, sassermaet was made by crofters—tenant farmers—in a large batch in the autumn to last the winter, using large quantities of salt and spices, and stored in earthenware crocks. Over the winter it was drawn down, combined with onions, fresh meat or breadcrumbs, and milk or eggs, then formed into brönies and fried, or baked as meatloaf.

One such typically large preparation of the spice mix was published by Margaret Stout in her 1925 cookbook Cookery for Northern Wives:

A mixture of spices in the following proportion is first made:

- 1/4 oz allspice
- 1/4 oz cloves
- 1/4 oz ginger
- 1/4 oz white pepper
- 1/4 oz black pepper
- 1/8 oz Jamaica pepper
- 1/8 oz cinnamon

This along with 6 oz salt, will season 12 lb minced meat.

Sassermaet continues to be prepared in Shetland in the original heavily spiced formulation by some home cooks, but more often it is made by butchers in a less heavily spiced version. As of the 1990s, Catherine Brown reported that all ten butchers in the islands prepared sassermaet for sale, with one making 200 kilograms (440 lb) a week. The types and ratios of spices vary between businesses and are closely guarded. Sassermaet is rarely found outside Shetland. In a 2022 episode of Landward, sassermaet was featured and was part of a cooking demonstration with celebrity chef Nick Nairn.

== See also ==
- Reestit mutton
- Scottish cuisine

== Sources ==
- Brown, Catherine (1998) [1996]. A Year in a Scots Kitchen: Celebrating Summer's End to Worshipping Its Beginning. Glascow: Neil Wilson Publishing. ISBN 1-897784-79-1.
- Brown, Catherine (2013) [1985]. Scottish Cookery (4th ed.). Edinburgh: Birlinn. ISBN 978-1-78027-108-8.
- Hope, Annette (1987). A Caledonian Feast. Edinburgh: Mainstream Publishing. ISBN 1-85158-077-8.
- "Kye Sassermaet". Scottish Food Guide.
- Lawrence, Sue (2006). A Cook's Tour of Scotland: From Barra to Brora in 120 Recipes. London: Headline Book Publishing. ISBN 0-7553-1417-4.
- Mason, Laura; Brown, Catherine (2006) [1999 as Traditional Foods of Britain]. The Taste of Britain. London: Harper Press. ISBN 978-0-00-724132-3.
- Morton, James; Morton, Tom (2018). Shetland: Cooking on the Edge of the World. London: Quadrille. ISBN 978-1-78713-306-8.
- "Sassermaet". I Hear Dee. 2021-11-28.
- "Shetland Kye Sassermaet - Arca del Gusto". Slow Food Foundation.
- "Vipond and Nairn make trip north for Landward". Shetland News. 2022-05-12.
