= Cider doughnut =

Type of doughnut

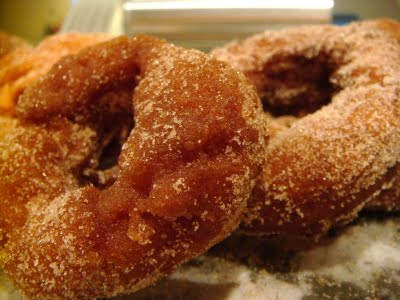
- Cider doughnuts topped with cinnamon
- Type: Doughnut
- Place of origin: United States
- Main ingredients: batter, cinnamon, nutmeg, apple cider

Cider doughnuts or apple cider doughnuts are American cake doughnuts that get their flavor from cinnamon, nutmeg and apple cider used in the batter. They are a harvest tradition in autumn in the northeastern United States and are sometimes sold at cider mills. They are often paired with apple cider, and may be covered with cinnamon or granulated sugar.

Cider doughnut season coincides with the harvest season for apples, beginning in September and lasting through November or December. According to Food & Wine, "year-round" cider doughnuts are likely to suffer from a lack of fresh-pressed cider and are best bought fresh, before they dry out. The doughnuts are sold in grocery stores as early as August and have also been offered as a seasonal item at Dunkin' Donuts.

They are a common accompaniment to leaf peeping and apple picking trips.

== History ==
Cider doughnuts date back as far as the late nineteenth century; a 1901 article in The Buffalo Enquirer references them served at Halloween parties. Doughnuts had long been associated with the autumn harvest season in the United States because animal slaughters would produce surplus fat for frying. The confection likely evolved with Adolph Levitt's 1921 invention of an doughnut-making machine which allowed producers to methodically fry circles of batter in oil. Farm stands that sold cider rapidly adopted the new contraption.

The first commercially produced cider doughnut may have been offered in 1951 by the Doughnut Corporation of America. The company's "sweet cider doughnut" was described in The New York Times as "a spicy round cake that is expected to have a natural fall appeal."

== Gallery ==
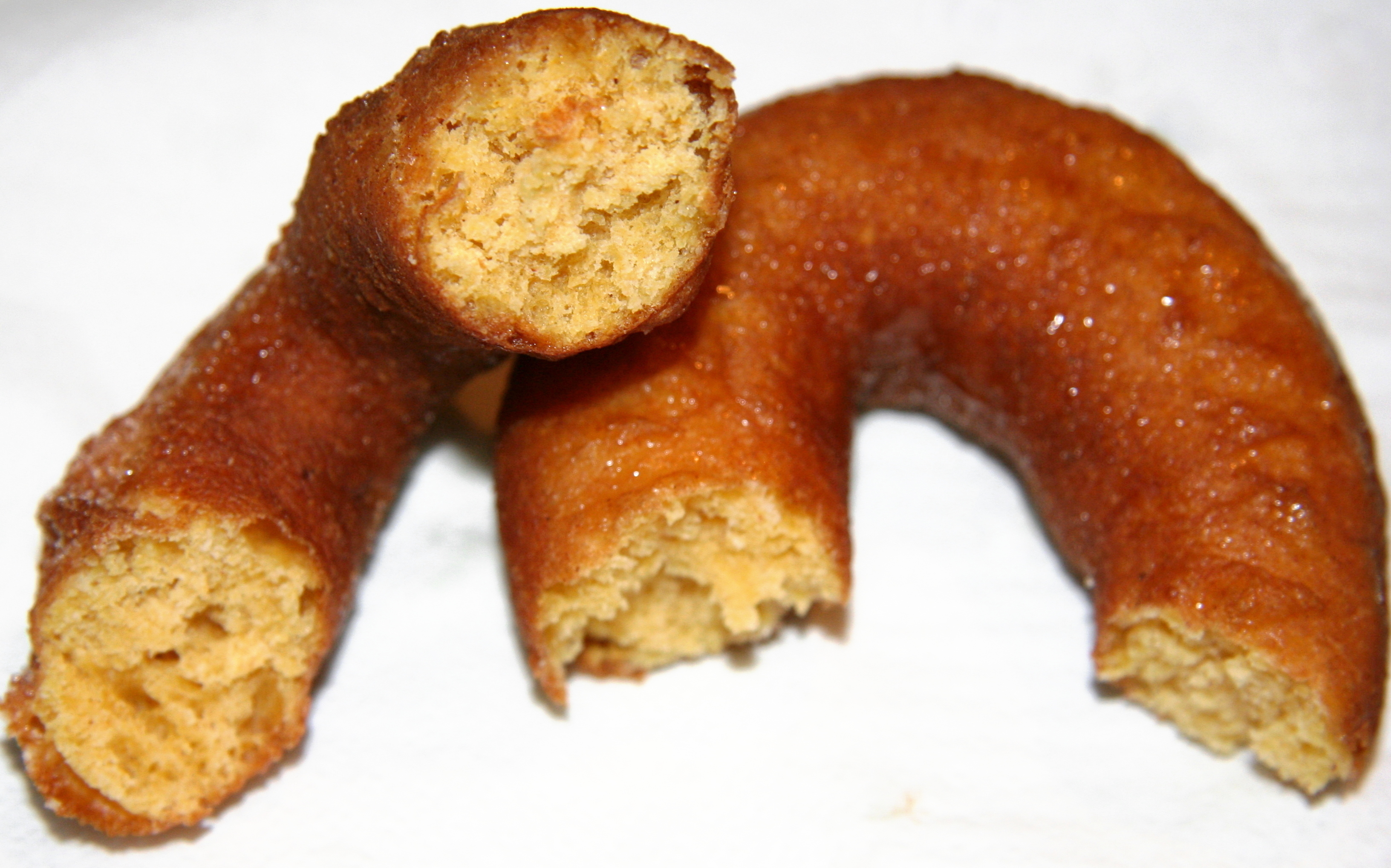
Cider doughnuts

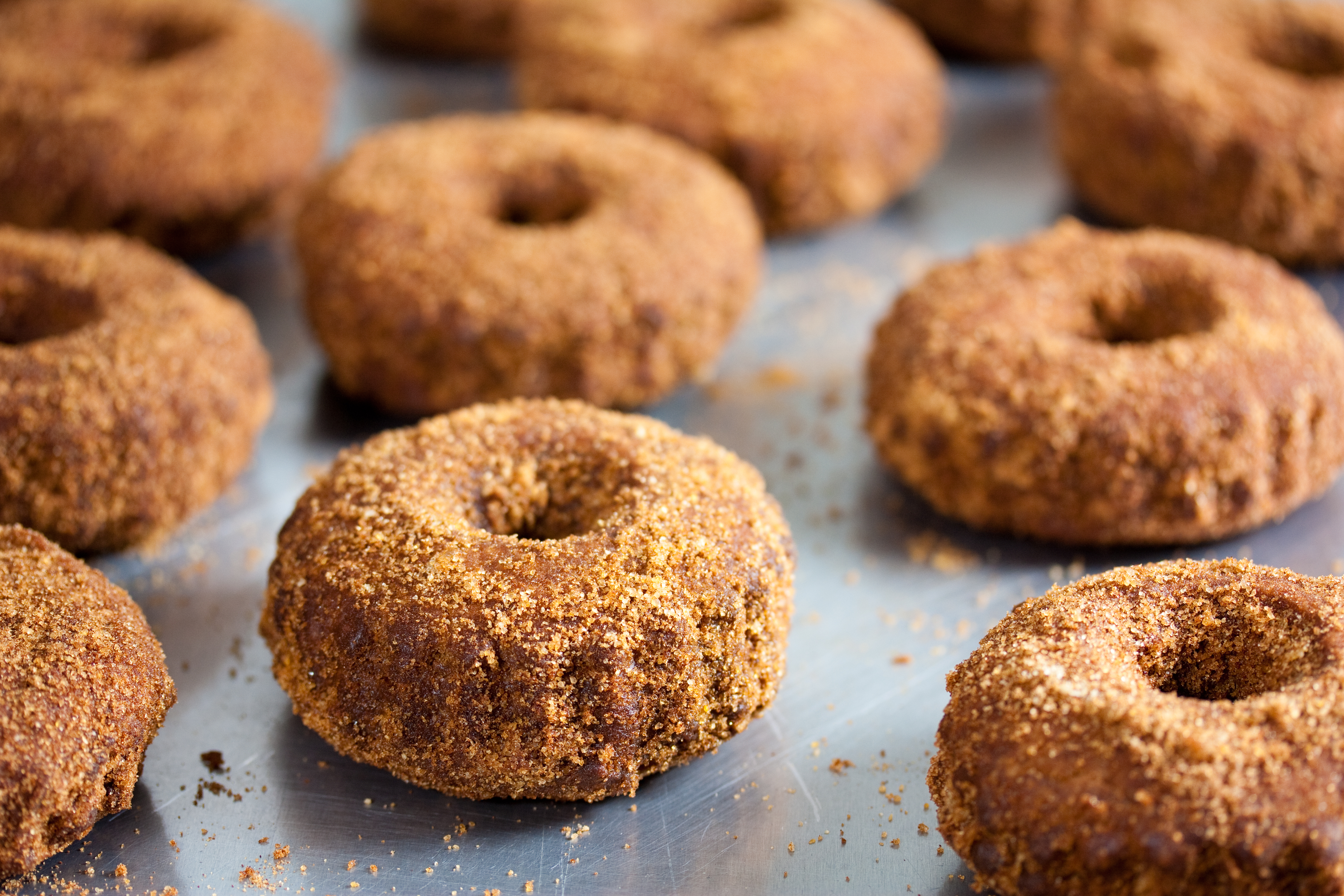
Vegan apple cider doughnuts

== See also ==
- Cider cake
- List of regional dishes of the United States
- List of doughnut varieties
- List of fried dough varieties
- List of breakfast foods
