= List of listed buildings in Kirkintilloch =

This is a list of listed buildings in the parish of Kirkintilloch in East Dunbartonshire, Scotland.

== List ==
Name	Location	Date listed	Grid ref. (Note: Sometimes known as OSGB36, the grid reference (where provided) is based on the British national grid reference system used by the Ordnance Survey. • "Guide to National Grid". Ordnance Survey. • "Get-a-map". Ordnance Survey.)	Geo-coordinates	Notes	LB number (Note: Historic Environment Scotland assign a unique alphanumeric identifier to each designated site in Scotland, for listed buildings this always begins with "LB", for example "LB12345".)	Image
Townhead And Luggiebank Road, Police Station				55°56′18″N 4°09′16″W	Category C(S)	44624	Upload another image See more images
R.C. Church Of The Holy Family And St. Ninian, Union Street				55°56′24″N 4°09′36″W	Category B	36663	Upload another image
Westermains Farm, 72-80 West High Street				55°56′27″N 4°09′44″W	Category B	36658	Upload Photo
Lenzie, Woodilee Hospital Main Block With Towers				55°55′39″N 4°08′00″W	Category B	13075	Upload another image See more images
Kilsyth Road, Former Broomhill Hospital Complex				55°56′51″N 4°08′54″W	Category B	49874	Upload another image See more images
West High Street Close At 18 E G A Colley's Property (South End West Side)				55°56′29″N 4°09′35″W	Category B	36653	Upload Photo
8, 10, 12, 14 Eastside				55°56′30″N 4°09′16″W	Category B	36656	Upload Photo
Gartshore Stables				55°56′29″N 4°05′37″W	Category B	12723	Upload Photo
St. Mary's Parish Church				55°56′21″N 4°09′19″W	Category B	36662	Upload another image
16 Boghead Road, Wester Gallow-Hill Cottage				55°55′42″N 4°09′50″W	Category C(S)	36660	Upload Photo
Dovecot, Gartshore House				55°56′21″N 4°05′42″W	Category B	12719	Upload Photo
Solsgirth				55°56′34″N 4°07′01″W	Category B	12721	Upload Photo
Luggie Bank House Including Yard And Detached Byre To Rear				55°56′12″N 4°08′50″W	Category B	36666	Upload Photo
Quaker's Cemetery Gartshore				55°56′09″N 4°05′58″W	Category B	12720	Upload Photo
Union Street, Kirkintilloch Town Hall				55°56′24″N 4°09′30″W	Category B	48641	Upload another image
Kilsyth Road, Former Lodge To Broomhill Hospital Complex (Including Boundary Walls And Gates)				55°56′36″N 4°08′57″W	Category B	49875	Upload Photo
Lenzie, 98-116 (Even Nos) Kirkintilloch Road, Queen's Building				55°55′19″N 4°09′16″W	Category C(S)	51265	Upload Photo
Old Aisle Road, Auld Aisle Cemetery Including Watch-House, Boundary Walls, Gatelodge And Gatepiers				55°55′57″N 4°08′18″W	Category A	36646	Upload another image See more images
The Steeple. (No. 5 West High Street)				55°56′28″N 4°09′33″W	Category B	36648	Upload Photo
West High Street, 16				55°56′28″N 4°09′35″W	Category C(S)	36649	Upload Photo
Glasgow Road, Washington House Including Boundary Walls And Gatepiers				55°56′25″N 4°09′51″W	Category C(S)	48633	Upload Photo
Union Street, St Ninian's Church Hall				55°56′23″N 4°09′34″W	Category B	48642	Upload Photo
Woodstock Avenue And Lammermoor Crescent, Meiklehill House Including Garden Terrace And Gatepiers				55°56′21″N 4°08′00″W	Category B	50008	Upload Photo
Twechar, Forth And Clyde Canal, Shirva Stables				55°57′08″N 4°05′50″W	Category C(S)	50222	Upload another image
Alexandra Street, St David's Memorial Park Parish Church (Church Of Scotland), Including Boundary Wall And Gatepiers				55°56′14″N 4°09′26″W	Category C(S)	51023	Upload Photo
Alexandra Street 2 K6 Telephone Kiosks				55°56′19″N 4°09′20″W	Category B	36667	Upload Photo
Luggie Bridge, High Street				55°56′30″N 4°09′20″W	Category B	36654	Upload Photo
No. 12 Glasgow Road				55°56′26″N 4°09′50″W	Category B	36657	Upload Photo
23-27 Townhead				55°56′16″N 4°09′15″W	Category C(S)	51592	Upload Photo
126 Cowgate (Eagle Inn)				55°56′19″N 4°09′20″W	Category B	49196	Upload Photo
Bandstand At Peel Park				55°56′25″N 4°09′40″W	Category C(S)	36664	Upload Photo
Drinking Fountain At Peel Park				55°56′25″N 4°09′42″W	Category C(S)	36665	Upload Photo
Old Parish Church Of St. Mary, Now A Museum				55°56′27″N 4°09′34″W	Category A	36645	Upload another image See more images
West High Street, Close At 18 P Brown's Property (South End East Side)				55°56′29″N 4°09′35″W	Category C(S)	36650	Upload Photo
West High Street, Close At 18 Air Powered Equipment (Scot) Ltd Premises (North End East Side)				55°56′29″N 4°09′35″W	Category B	36651	Upload Photo
West High Street Close At 18 The Wee House (North End West Side)				55°56′29″N 4°09′36″W	Category C(S)	36652	Upload Photo
Luggie Water Aqueduct And Bridge				55°56′23″N 4°09′04″W	Category A	36655	Upload Photo
Balquharrage Bridge				55°56′42″N 4°09′22″W	Category C(S)	36659	Upload Photo
10 & 12 Boghead Road				55°55′42″N 4°09′50″W	Category C(S)	36661	Upload Photo
Old School, Easterton				55°56′38″N 4°05′15″W	Category C(S)	13637	Upload Photo
Dovecot, Auchinvole				55°58′00″N 4°03′39″W	Category C(S)	12722	Upload Photo

== Key ==
The scheme for classifying buildings in Scotland is:

- Category A: "buildings of national or international importance, either architectural or historic; or fine, little-altered examples of some particular period, style or building type."
- Category B: "buildings of regional or more than local importance; or major examples of some particular period, style or building type, which may have been altered."
- Category C: "buildings of local importance; lesser examples of any period, style, or building type, as originally constructed or moderately altered; and simple traditional buildings which group well with other listed buildings."

In March 2016 there were 47,288 listed buildings in Scotland. Of these, 8% were Category A, and 50% were Category B, with the remaining 42% being Category C.

== See also ==
- List of listed buildings in East Dunbartonshire
