= J. Dalrymple Duncan =

Scottish landowner, antiquarian and amateur chemist (1852-1908)

(James) Dalrymple Duncan of Woodhead FRSE FSA (7 July 1852 – 8 February 1908), his birth name, was a Scottish lawyer, landowner and antiquarian. He assumed Dalrymple as a surname on the death of his uncle James Dalrymple of Woodhead; and was granted arms by the Lyon Court as Dalrymple in 1902.

He was a keen amateur chemist, elected a fellow of the Royal Society of Edinburgh. He was a fellow of both the Society of Antiquaries of London and Society of Antiquaries of Scotland. In 1907 he was founder of the Dalrymple Lecture in Archaeology.

== Background and early life ==
He was the son of Rev. Thomas Gray Duncan (1808–1861) and Mary Dalrymple (1811–1895) of Kirkintilloch, born on 7 July 1852. His father was educated at the University of Edinburgh, and became a minister of the Church of Scotland at St David's in Kirkintilloch. At the Disruption of 1843 he left the Church of Scotland and joined the Free Church of Scotland. He spent six years as minister at Lockerbie. He then moved to the Trinity Presbyterian Church of Newcastle upon Tyne in 1850, where he remained for the rest of his life.

Dalrymple Duncan was educated at the Newcastle school run by John Collingwood Bruce, and at Edinburgh High School. He attended Glasgow University and Edinburgh University.

== Legal career ==
Dalrymple Duncan then went to work for the law firm McGrigor, Donald & Co. In 1877 he entered the Royal Faculty of Procurators in Glasgow. Living at 54 Grant Street, Glasgow, from 1878 to 1887, he worked at Brownlie, Watson & Beckett, writers to the signet at 225 West George Street. At 211 Hope Street, Glasgow, he was in business with Duncan, Baird & Young in 1884; and subsequently as a partner in the law firm Duncan & Morrison. In 1901 he is listed as resigning as a Director from the firm of Duncan & Morrison of Hope Street.

The firm was carried on by his partner Frederick Lansdowne Morrison; a volunteer army officer, he served in World War I as colonel of the 5th (City of Glasgow) Battalion of the Highland Light Infantry, in France, Gallipoli and Palestine, dying of illness in Alexandria in 1917.

== Later life ==
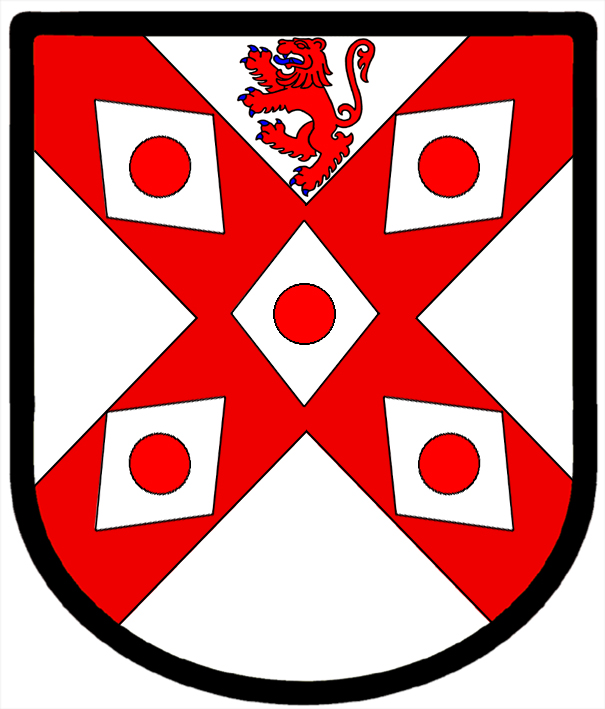
Dalrymple of Woodhead escutcheon, granted 1902

Around 1900 he changed his name to James Dalrymple Gray Dalrymple; around the same time he succeeded his uncle as laird of Woodhead, Dunbartonshire. At that period he was living at Meiklewood near Gargunnock, in the Stirling area (see below). He was a Justice of the Peace for both Dunbartonshire and Stirlingshire. He died on 8 February 1908.

== Interests ==
From 1870 to 1872 and from 1878 to 1880, Dalrymple Duncan was president of the Kirkintilloch Agricultural Society. He was secretary of the Glasgow Archaeological Society from 1877. He was elected a fellow of the Royal Society of Edinburgh in January 1889. His proposers were Sir James Robertson (Earl of Kintore), John Gray McKendrick, and John Ferguson.

Dalrymple Duncan by 1896 had been elected a fellow of the Society of Antiquaries of Scotland, and of the Society of Antiquaries of London.

== Family ==
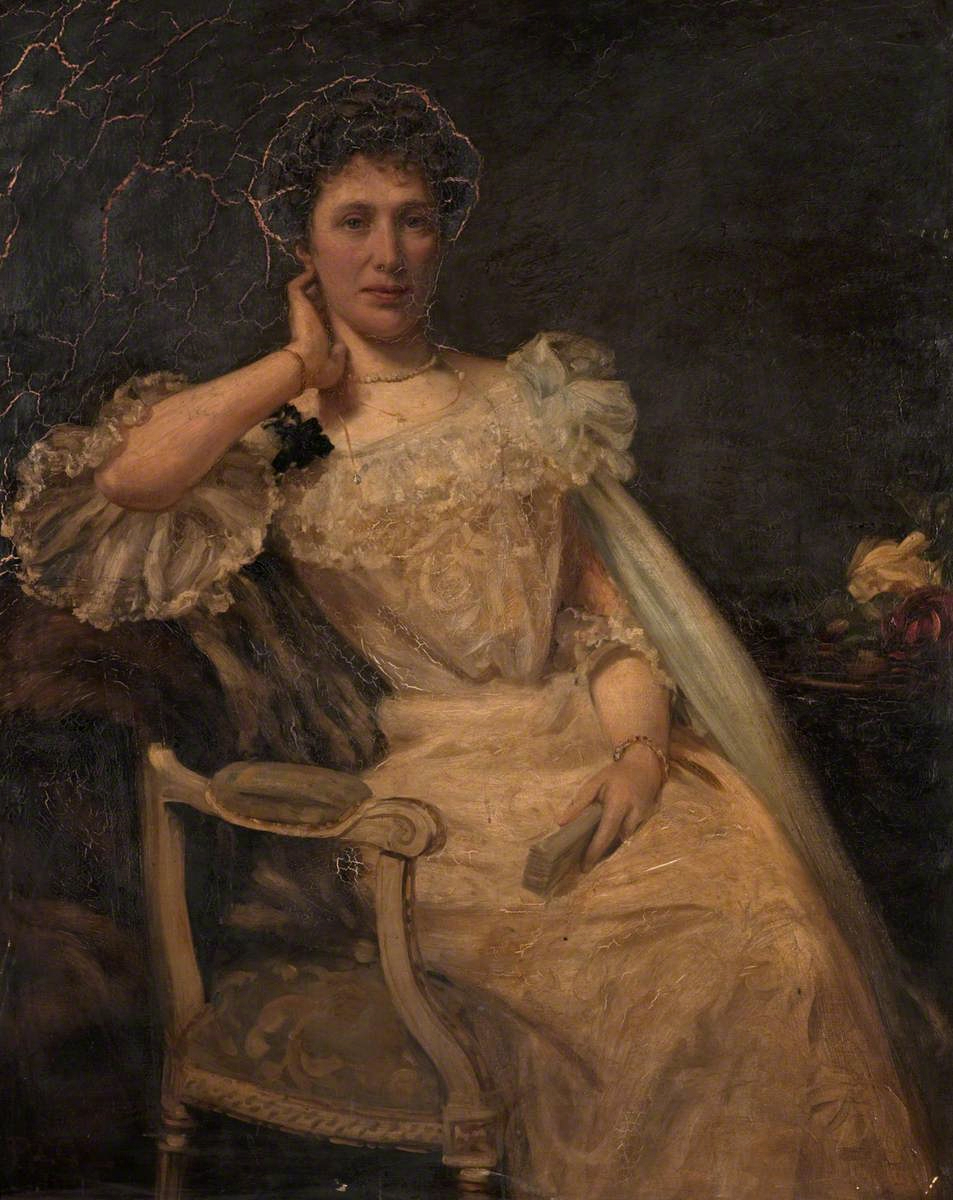
Mary Dalrymple Duncan, portrait by John Gibson in the Hunterian Museum and Art Gallery

In 1890, Dalrymple Duncan married Katherine Hutton Rowan of Holmfauldhead House, Govan (1854–1929), daughter of Stephen Rowan, who died in 1854. She had previously been married in 1878 to Patrick Francis Connal, son of William Connal of Solsgirth. The Meiklewood estate in Stirlingshire had been bought by her father from a branch of the Grahams of Montrose, and her mother Grace née Wingate (died 1877) resided there; her first husband died there in 1887. She had a son George Francis Connal (born 1885), later Connal-Rowan, an officer of the Argyll and Sutherland Highlanders.

Dalrymple Duncan's mother Mary Dalrymple Duncan died on 24 May 1895 at 54 Grant Street, Glasgow. He was survived by his brother Thomas Dalrymple of Woodhead (1854–1933).

== Publications ==
- Craignethan Castle
- Bothwell Castle
- A Visit to Les Saintes Maries de la Camargue, St Maximin and La Saint Baume (1890)
- St Martin D’Auxigny: An Old Scots Colony in France (1890)
- The Chateau of St Fargeau (1900)

== Legacy ==
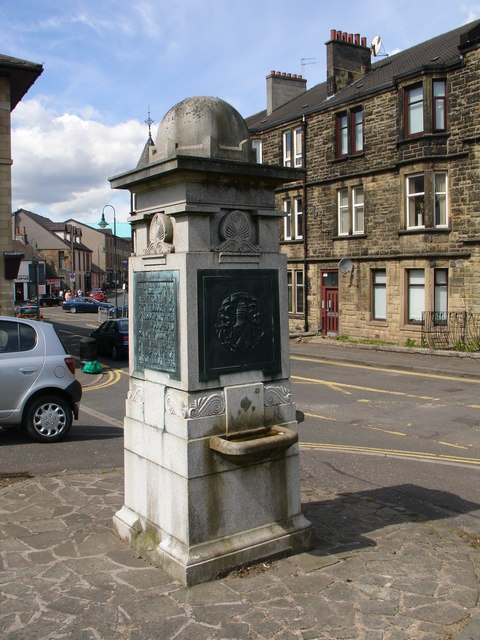
The Dalrymple Memorial, Townhead, Kirkintilloch

His country estate of Woodhead now forms Woodhead Park, gifted to Kirkintilloch in the early 20th century and formalised as a park in 1931.

The Dalrymple Fountain on Industry Street in Kirkintilloch was also gifted to the town.
