= Reestit mutton =

Type of salted mutton traditional to the Shetland Islands

Reestit Mutton
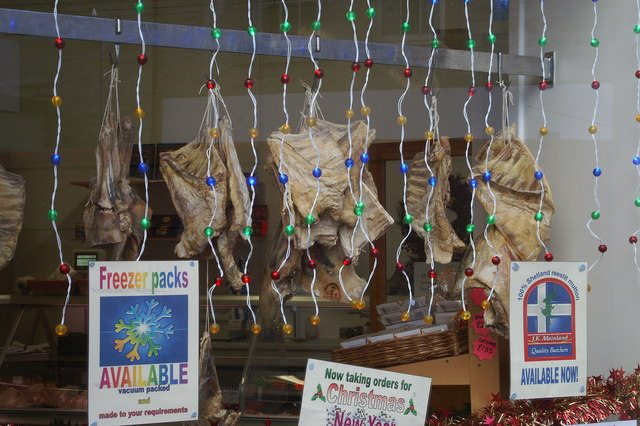
- Reestit mutton on display in a butcher's window in Lerwick
- Type: Cured meat
- Course: Starter or main course
- Place of origin: Scotland
- Region or state: Shetland
- Main ingredients: Mutton, salt
- Ingredients generally used: Sugar, saltpetre, sometimes served with bannocks
- Variations: Soup; Fried; Reestit mutton pie
- Similar dishes: Skerpikjøt

Reestit mutton (/ˈriːstɪt ˈmʌtən/ REES-tit-MUT-ən) is a type of salted mutton traditional to the Shetland Islands, Scotland. It has been termed "Shetland's national dish.”

== History ==
The name reestit mutton comes from the Shaetlan word reest, meaning to cure by drying or smoking. A wooden framework, called a reest, was traditionally placed across the rafters of a building, from which the mutton would traditionally be hung to dry with the aid of smoke from a peat fire.

Reestit mutton was traditionally prepared as a way of preserving mutton so that it could be eaten during winter. It is related to similar Scandinavian methods of drying meat, such as skerpikjøt and fenalår. If prepared correctly reestit mutton can remain edible for up to four years.

== Preparation and serving ==
Reestit mutton is prepared by soaking a leg or shoulder of mutton in brine. The correct ratio of coarse salt to water for the brine is achieved when a potato or egg will float in the solution. Some recipes also call for the addition of a small amount of sugar or saltpetre to the solution. The mutton is kept in the brine until the solution has reached all parts of the meat, which can take around three weeks. The meat is then hung to dry in proximity to a peat fire until the meat solidifies.

Reestit mutton is commonly used as the basis for reestit mutton soup. The soup is made with tatties (potatoes), and is commonly served with bannocks - small savoury scone-like baked items. This dish is commonly associated with the Up Helly Aa fire festival. It can also be used as the filling of a reestit mutton pie.

== Flavour ==
Reestit mutton has a salty flavour, which is also influenced by the peat smoke to which it is exposed when drying. The food is considered nostalgic by Shetlanders. The first butcher to sell reestit mutton on a commercial basis in Lerwick, Shetland advertised it as having "an acquired taste that you acquire at the first taste".

== See also ==
- Fenalår
- Skerpikjøt
- Sassermaet

== Sources ==
- Armitage, Marian (2 June 2016). "The Ultimate Reestit Mutton Pie". Shetland Life.
- Atia, Elizabeth (10 November 2014). "Reestit Mutton Soup". Shetland.org.
- Brown, Catherine (14 November 2011). A Year In A Scots Kitchen. Neil Wilson Publishing Ltd. ISBN 9781906476847.
- Graham, John J. (2009) [1979]. "reest". Shetland ForWirds.
- Wishart, Martin (6 February 2016). "Reestit mutton and tattie soup". HeraldScotland.
- National Geographic Book Service (1985). Discovering Britain & Ireland. Washington, D.C.: National Geographic Society. OCLC 1033641841.
- "Getting set to enjoy Shetland's national dish - reestit mutton". Scottish Field. 23 January 2018.
