= Kirkintilloch Town Hall =

Municipal building in Kirkintilloch, Scotland

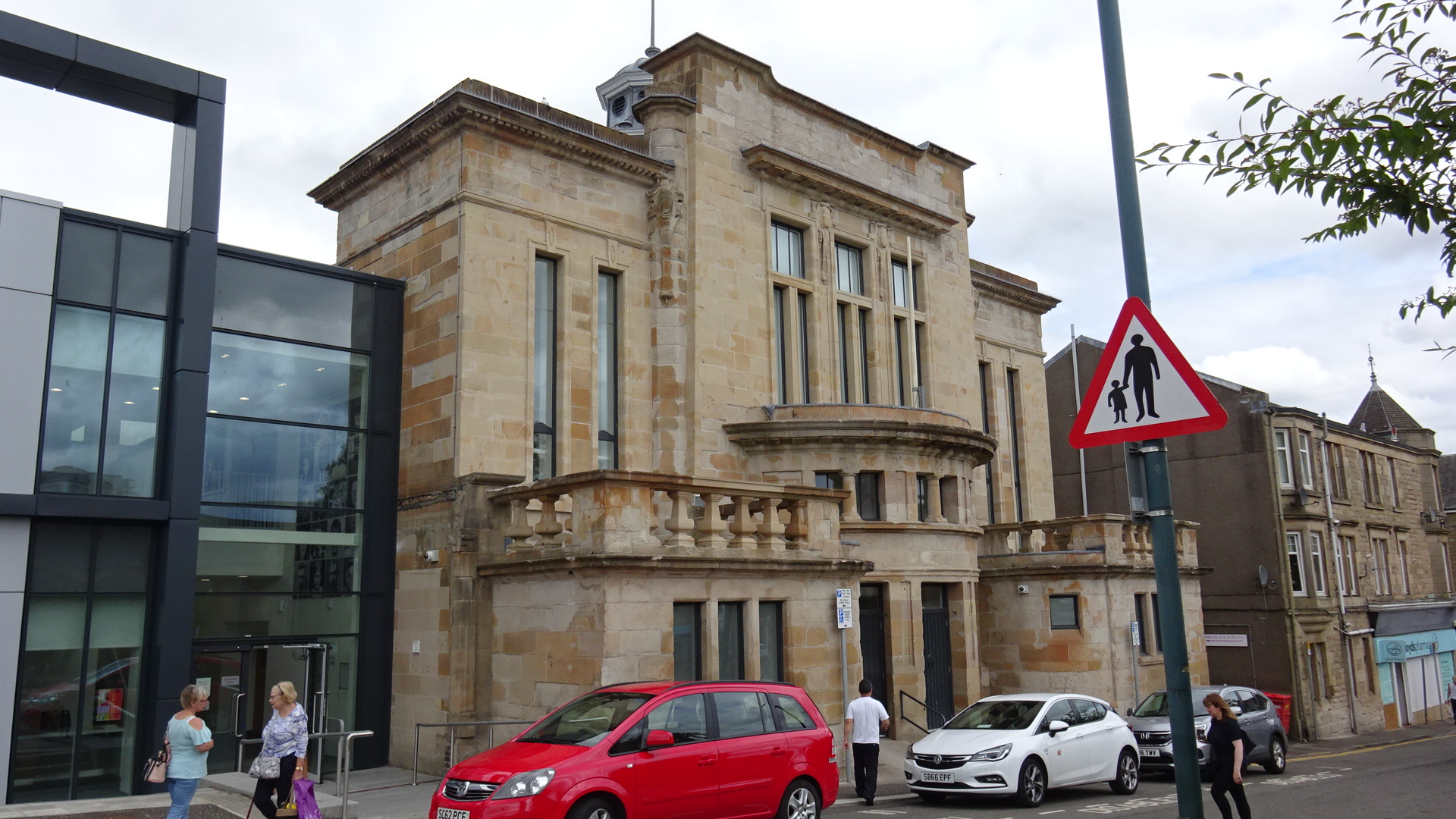
- Kirkintilloch Town Hall

- Shown in East Dunbartonshire
- 55.9400°N 4.1582°W
- Location: Kirkintilloch

History
- Built: 1906

Site notes
- Architect(s): Walker and Ramsay
- Architectural style: Classical style

Listed Building – Category B
- Designated: 28 May 2002
- Reference no.: LB48641

Kirkintilloch Town Hall is a municipal building in Union Street in Kirkintilloch, East Dunbartonshire, Scotland. It is a category B listed building.

== History ==
=== Early history ===
The current building was commissioned to replace the old tolbooth in West High Street which had been completed in 1815. After rapid industrial expansion and population growth in the local area, as well as a deterioration in the condition of the tolbooth, civic leaders decided to procure a purpose-built town hall: the site they selected in Union Street had previously been occupied by a school.

The new building was designed by Walker and Ramsay of Glasgow in the classical style. Paid for by public subscription, it cost £11,000 to build and opened in July 1906. The design involved a symmetrical frontage with five bays along Union Street; the central section of three bays featured an unusual bowed triple-doorway on the ground floor with a frieze and cornice above; there were six tall narrow windows on the first floor. The building was renovated in 1931 and extended in 1959.

=== Closure and redevelopment ===
The building was closed by East Dunbartonshire Council on 30 June 2004, largely due to the anticipated expense of restoring a building constructed of notoriously crumbling soft sandstone. In response, the Kirkintilloch Town Hall Preservation Trust was established as a registered charity to preserve the Hall and restore it for community use. In November 2010 rats were sighted inside the building and concerns were expressed that the hall could be infested with them. After the local newspaper asked East Dunbartonshire Council to see inside the building, the council turned down the request on the grounds of health and safety. Campsie and Kirkintilloch North councillor Charles Kennedy said that this showed how much the premises had deteriorated and called for their demolition. In December 2011 the Kirkintilloch Herald's request for access was granted and the paper reported on the building's condition; parts of the ceiling on one side of the hall had fallen onto the floor and there was debris lying all around, considerable dampness and crumbling paintwork. East Dunbartonshire Council stated that extensive dry rot and general fabric deterioration were the main problems with the Hall.

In the early summer of 2016 work began on the redevelopment of the hall into a centre for heritage, arts and culture. In July 2016, and in the course of works being done as part of the redevelopment, a number of Roman items were discovered in the building's car park, including pottery and a nail. The hall was officially reopened in November 2018.

== See also ==
- List of listed buildings in Kirkintilloch
