= Tommy Lorne =

British comedian

- 1920s postcard
- Born: Hugh Gallagher Corcoran; 7 December 1890; Kirkintilloch, Dunbartonshire, Scotland
- Died: 17 April 1935 (aged 44); Edinburgh, Scotland
- Occupation: Comic entertainer
- Years active: 1904–1935

Tommy Lorne (born Hugh Gallagher Corcoran; 7 December 1890 – 17 April 1935) was a Scottish music hall comedian of the 1920s.

== Life ==
Born in Kirkintilloch, he grew up in Glasgow. He joined a local minstrel troupe as a boy, and made his first music hall appearance in 1904, in a talent show run by George Formby Sr. Before becoming a full-time entertainer, he worked in a steelworks drawing office. A dancer as well as a comic entertainer, he formed a duo, Wallace and Lorne, who billed themselves as "Champion Dancers of the World", and performed sand dances in variety shows on tour in Scotland, the north of England, and Wales.

In 1916, Lorne joined the army, serving in India and Afghanistan, and when discharged in 1920 became a comedian in Harry McKelvie's company, performing in revues and pantomimes. He quickly became popular as a comic entertainer in Scotland, and developed a distinct and instantly recognisable act and style. He was tall and thin, and performed in a high-pitched voice, wearing clown-like white make-up, boots that were too large, a jacket that was too short, a Glengarry and a very short kilt.

He occasionally performed in London, but most of his appearances were in Scotland and the north of England. In 1924, he made a record-breaking tour of Scotland with a revue, Froth, that also featured the Houston sisters when it played in Glasgow. In 1927, Lorne made two short films, The Lard Song and Tommy Lorne and "Dumplings", both filmed in the DeForest Phonofilm sound-on-film process.

Although he had previously resisted playing as a pantomime dame, he had one of his greatest successes when he did so at the King's Theatre in Edinburgh in 1928. His work was admired by other Scottish comedians including Harry Lauder and Will Fyffe.

Lorne, who was an alcoholic, died from double pneumonia in hospital in Edinburgh after collapsing during a performance. He was 45.

== Legacy ==
Though it is sometimes said that Lorne sausage is named after him, advertisements for Lorne sausage have been found in newspapers as early as 1896, and both the sausage and Lorne himself seem to have taken their names from the Scottish region.

== Catchphrases ==
- "In the name of the wee man!"
- "Ah'll get ye, and if Ah don't get you the coos'll get ye!"
- "Sausages is the boys!"
