= Fenalår =

Norwegian cured leg of lamb

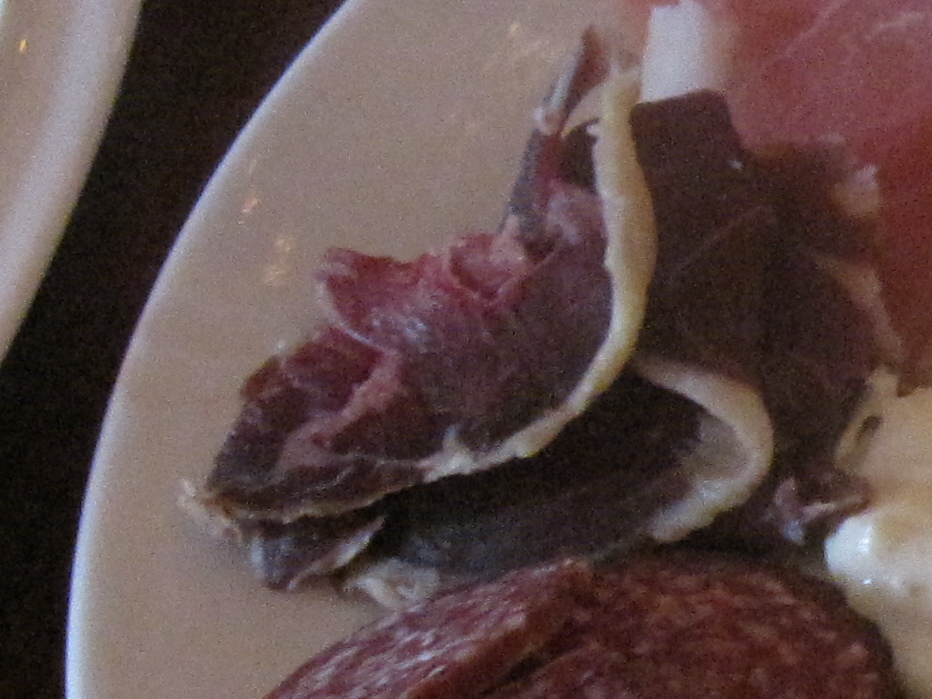
Slices of fenalår

Fenalår is a traditional Norwegian cured meat made from salted and dried leg of lamb. Fenalår is a very popular dish in Norway and is often served with other preserved food at a Christmas buffet or on Norwegian Constitution Day.

Curing time is normally about three months, but fenalår may be matured for a year or more. In some parts of the region, especially in the Voss area, the leg is also slightly smoked (using a cold smoke process) before curing to prevent any mould-related problems that may occur when drying meat in a humid, mild climate. It is still quite common for many Norwegians to salt and cure the meat at home. The finished meat is dark red to brown in color. Fresh-cut slices of high quality fenalår are smooth, tender and somewhat shiny, but not moist. The taste is slightly sweet and not too salty. The meat must have a pronounced, but never rancid, taste of mutton.

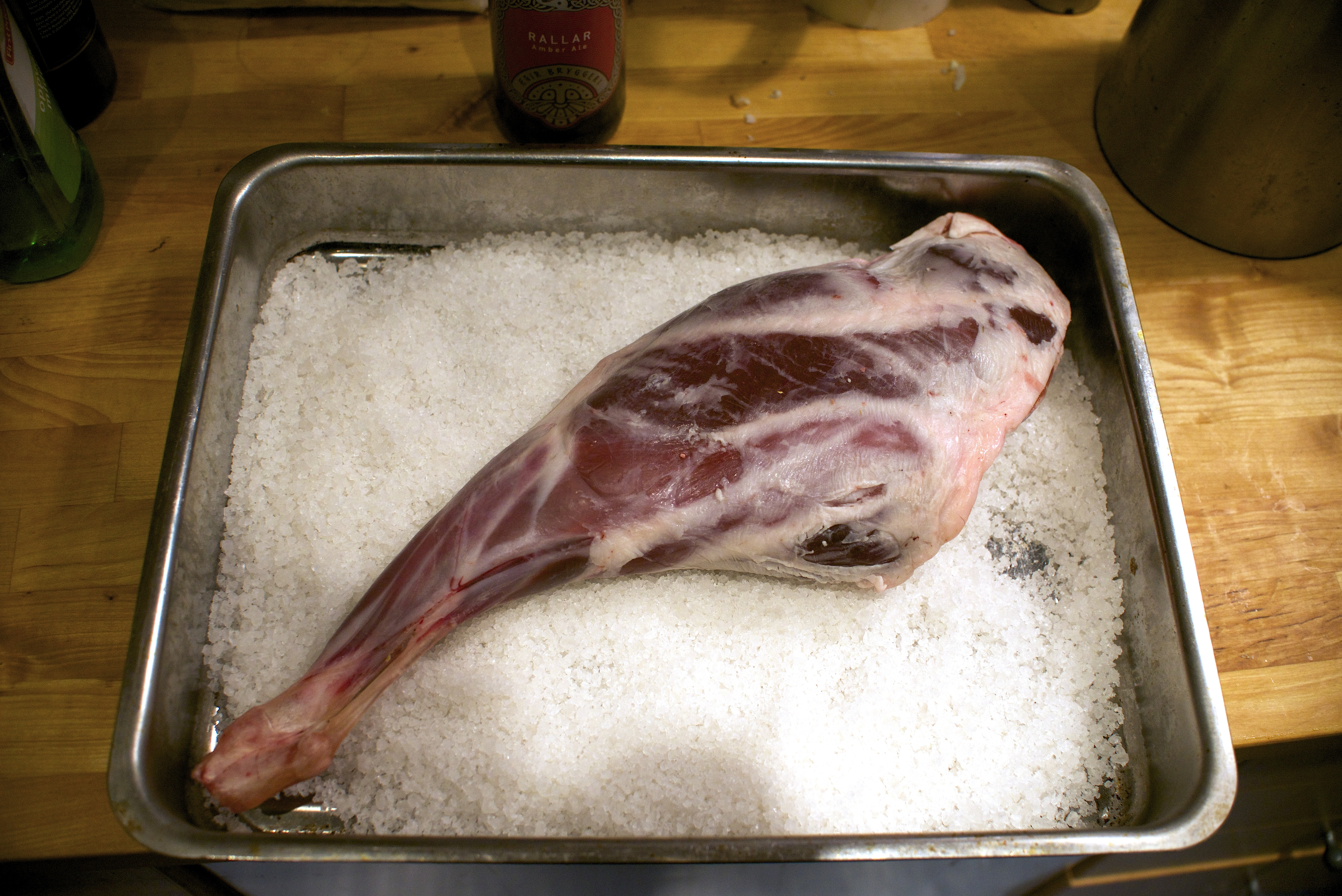
First stage of dry salting. The leg will be covered with salt and stored in a cool place for 3-5 days.

The meat is normally served as thin slices, but it is also common—at informal gatherings—to send the leg around the table with a sharp, stubby knife. The guests then slice the leg themselves. Thus, in western Norway, fenalår is called spikkekjøtt, literally 'whittle-meat', but this name may also originate from the word speke, 'to cure'. Fenalår is sometimes served with sour cream porridge (rømmegraut), scrambled eggs, a dill and double-cream-based, tepid potato salad and oven baked Bergen-style "water-pretzels" are other typical combinations.

== See also ==
- Norwegian cuisine
- List of Norwegian dishes
- Reestit mutton
- Pinnekjøtt
- Smalahove
- Ingrid Espelid Hovig
