= Skerpikjøt =

Wind-dried mutton from the Faroe Islands

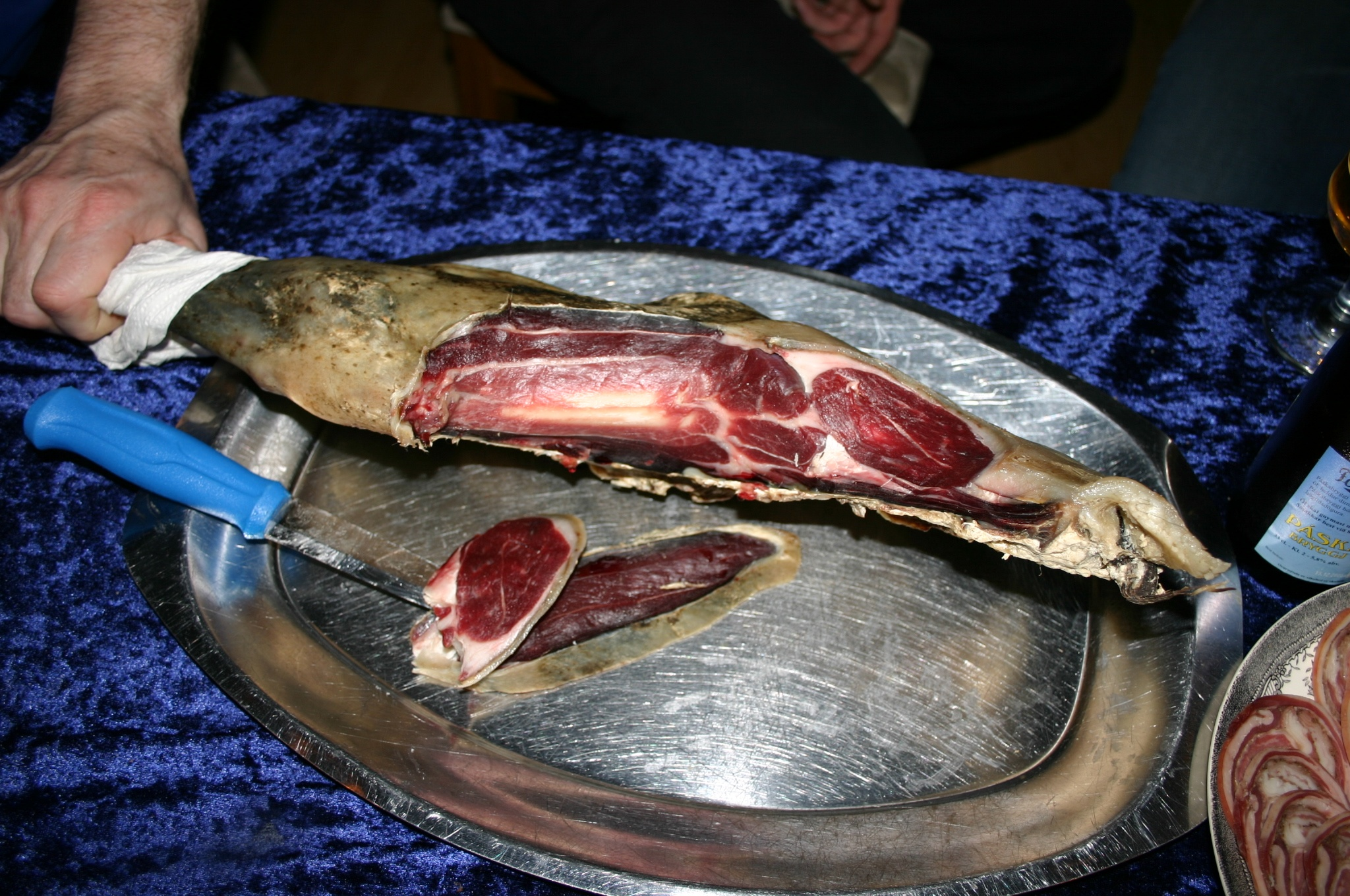
Skerpikjøt

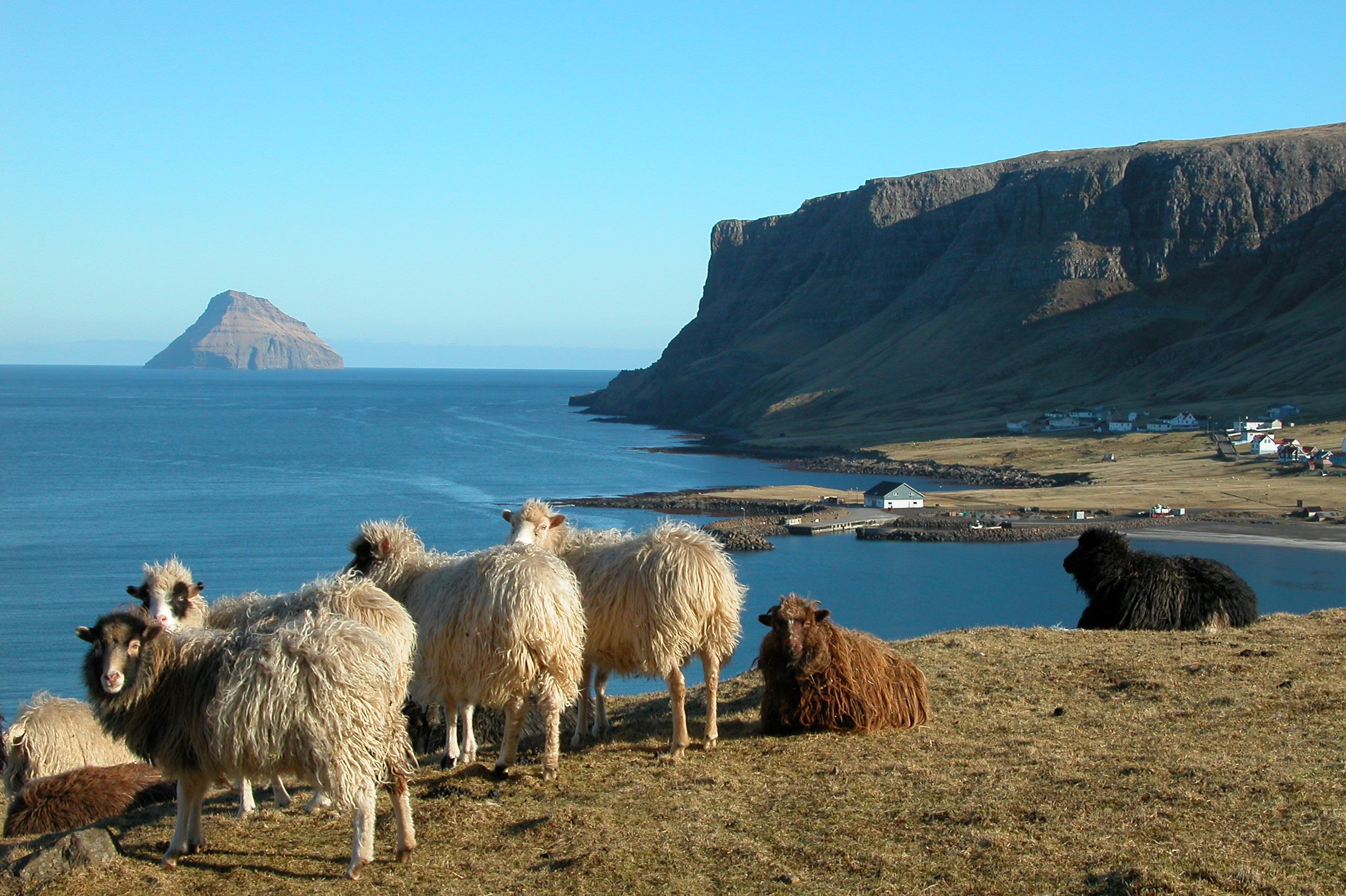
Faroese sheep

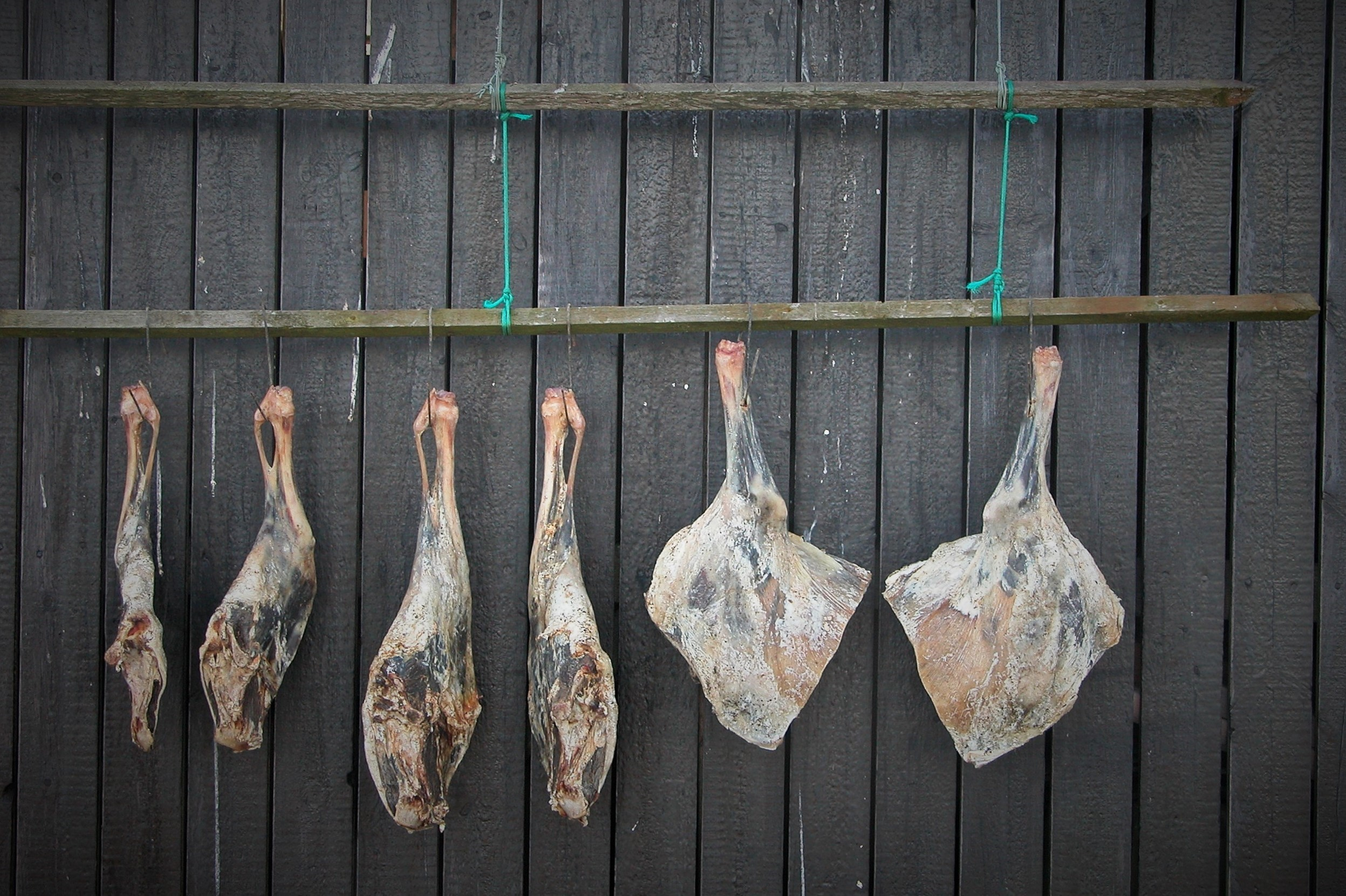
Lamb hanging out to dry

Skerpikjøt (Faroese pronunciation: [ˈskɛrpɪt͡ʃøːt]), a type of wind-dried mutton, is a common food of the Faroe Islands.

== Production ==
The mutton, usually in the form of shanks or legs (kjógv or bógv in Faroese, depending on which leg it is), is allowed to hang in a so-called hjallur, a drying shed ventilated by the wind, for five to nine months, with the process beginning in the colder fall months between September and October. It has a very strong smell, which may upset those who are not accustomed to it.

The hanging process covers three stages, or hjeldene. Each causing the meat to have different consistencies, smells and tastes.

- The first, visnaður, occurs after just a few days, but lamb and mutton are not eaten after such a short period.
- The second stage, ræstur, is of less predictable length, and provides dried meat suitable for eating without cooking.
- In reaching the final stage, turrur, cold weather can on occasion virtually eliminate the typical smell with a resulting weakening of taste. If, however, the weather is warm and wet during the first period, the fermentation process can cause the meat to decay, giving it too strong a taste.

There can therefore be variations in taste from year to year, but this is not usually a problem. A much more serious problem is infestation by flies. For this reason, the drying sheds used to be placed next to streams or the sea in order to diminish the arrival of flies.

== Consumption ==
When the skerpikjøt is ready, it is cut into thin slices and eaten on rye bread in the form of an open faced sandwich.

== See also ==
- Reestit mutton, a similar salted mutton dish from Shetland
- List of dried foods
- List of lamb dishes
