= Waterside, East Dunbartonshire =

Coordinates: 55.9337°N 4.1193°W

Waterside
- Location within East Dunbartonshire
- OS grid reference: NS674733
- Council area: East Dunbartonshire
- Lieutenancy area: Dunbartonshire
- Country: Scotland
- Sovereign state: United Kingdom
- Post town: GLASGOW
- Postcode district: G
- Dialling code: 0141
- Police: Scotland
- Fire: Scottish
- Ambulance: Scottish
- UK Parliament: Cumbernauld, Kilsyth and Kirkintilloch East
- Scottish Parliament: Strathkelvin and Bearsden

Waterside is a small village next to Kirkintilloch, East Dunbartonshire, on the eastern outskirts. It is roughly 10 miles north-east of Glasgow.

== History ==
In former times, Waterside was characterised by its neat and tidy weavers' cottages on the north bank of the Luggie river, and its picturesque mills on the south bank. In between lay a well-built mill dam.

Many of the former weavers' cottages survive but the mills have long since been demolished. The mill dam has collapsed into a scattering of stones on the river bed. The upper of the two mills, built in 1779 as a lint mill for the processing of flax for the local linen industry, was situated beside the dam, and was a popular subject for picture postcards. Further downstream was the Earl of Wigton's ancient corn mill of Duntiblae, where local people took their grain for grinding. A lade, or water course, led from the mill dam first to the lint mill, then several hundred yards downstream to the corn mill, to supply both with water. Remains of the lade channel can still be discerned on the south bank of the Luggie, near the footbridge.

The corn mill was burned down during the middle years of the nineteenth century but was rebuilt as a factory for making spades and shovels. The lint mill was later adapted as an auxiliary of the shovel works.

Another interesting building at Waterside is the former Subscription School, which survives just north of the footbridge. An inscription provides the information that it was erected in 1839 by Wm Aitken & Co., contractors. The Subscription School was superseded by Gartconner School and later served as a meeting place for a variety of local organisations.

== Waterside Football park ==
During 2011, the existing grass football pitch surface at Waterside has been upgraded with the installation of a new drainage system and sand slits. Surface works including levelling, cultivation, top dressing, grass seeding and initial maintenance work have also been carried out.

For the park's last event before this work began, a special charity match was arranged with local residents Paul Hartley and former Celtic hit man John Hartson captaining each of their teams. John Hartson bagged a hat-trick and led his side to a comfortable 6–3 victory on 11 January. It was the first time Hartson had graced a football pitch since his treatment for cancer. Many local celebrities took part in the match, such as former Saint Ninian's High pupil, and now star of The Thick Of It, Peter Capaldi.

== See also ==
- Kirkintilloch
