= Pigeon pie =

Game pie made using pigeon meat

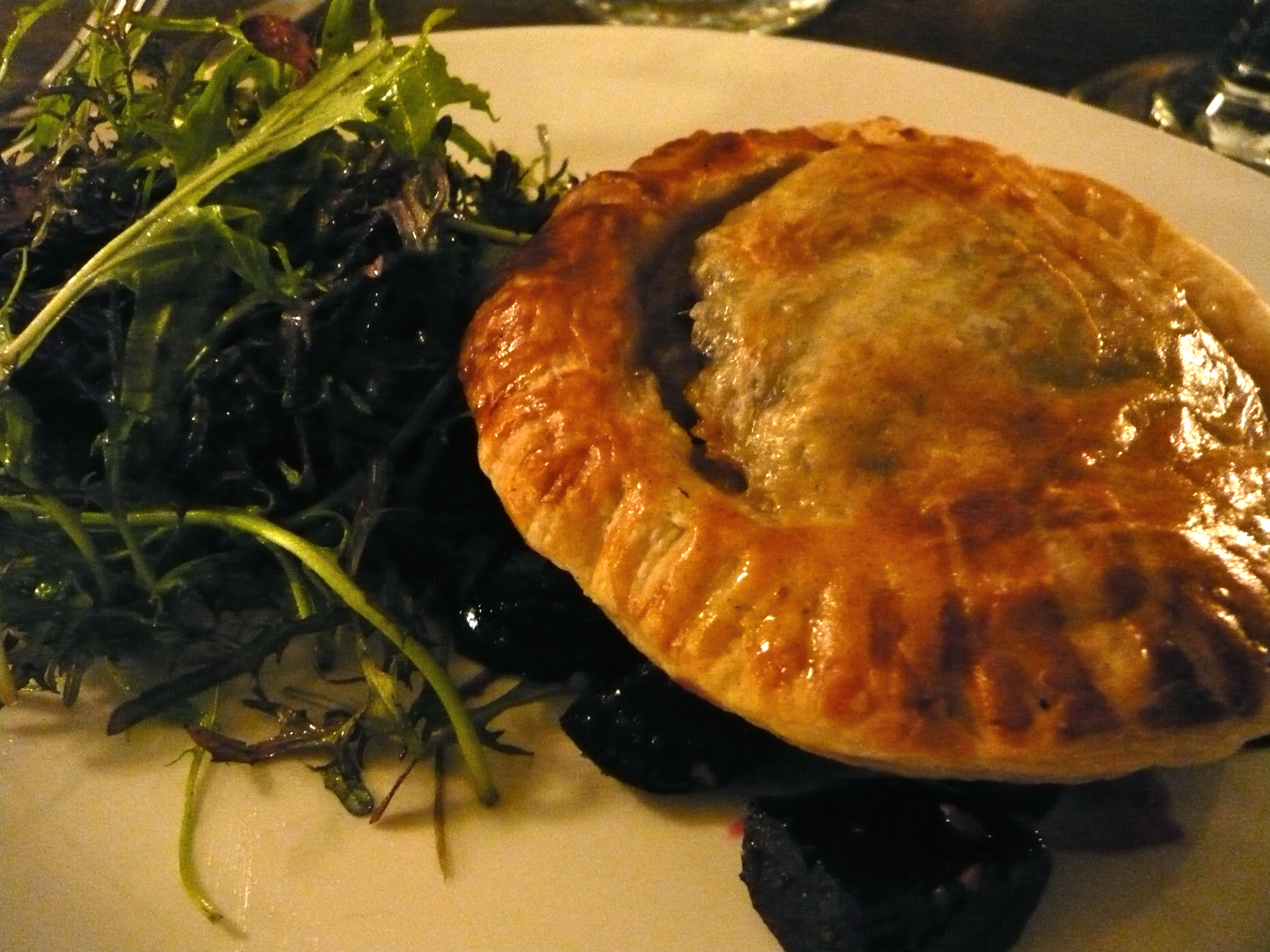
- Pigeon pie with beetroot
- Course: Main
- Place of origin: France
- Main ingredients: Pigeon

Pigeon pie is a savoury game pie made of pigeon meat and various other ingredients traditional to French cuisine and present in other European cuisines. It has been eaten at least as early as 1670 in French cuisine.

Similar dishes to pigeon pie exist in other cultures. In Morocco, a version made with a thin, phyllo-like pastry crust is called bastila. Early versions of the traditional Canadian dish of tourtière, currently made with meats such as pork or beef, were probably made of pigeon, likely the now extinct passenger pigeon.

== Historical record ==
An early recipe for pigeon pie was given in A Proper Newe Booke of Cokerye, published in London in 1575. James Hart, a Scottish physician, wrote in 1633 that pigeon pies were usually served with far too much pepper. The diary of Samuel Pepys recounts his attendance at a dinner party on May 24, 1667, in Islington, London, where the guests "dined upon nothing but pigeon-pyes". Cookery books of the seventeenth century show that pigeons were 'well spiced with nutmegs, cloves, pepper and salt, and sealed in butter within the cold pie, which could then be kept for several days. But with the advent of potting (preserving food, especially meat or fish, in a sealed pot or jar) pies of this type became less common'. Records in the British National Archives show that pigeon pie was a menu item at Kew Palace during the reign of George III. For the working classes however, without access to the dovecotes of the gentry, pigeon pie was a rare treat.

In 1879, the British Medical Journal reported a group of sailors aboard the Troop ship HMS Tamar (1863) were poisoned by a bad pigeon pie which spawned an Admiralty investigation.

Before the late 19th century in the United States, pigeon pie was a common dish. Archival records show that pigeon pie was a traditional dish for the American holiday of Thanksgiving, though is currently uncommon at Thanksgiving meals. Similarly, during the earlier part of the 19th century pigeon pie was a common Christmas meal in Detroit, but later was replaced by other meats. The reviewers in The Pacific Northwest Quarterly of the 1976 The Homestead Cookbook edited by Victoria Paul, noted that without publications of cookbooks like it, the traditional dish of pigeon pie would become culturally extinct in the United States.

In Spain, pigeon eating was a common practice as early as the 14th century under the 1379 Order of the Pigeon created by King Juan I of Castile. The order ate pigeon regularly at their order banquets. In 1611, a recipe book by the royal chef at the court of Philip III of Spain included recipes for pigeon pie. Similarly, a chef at a university residence hall in Spain included recipes for pigeon pies in his 1607 collection of recipes.

== See also ==
- Squab pie (English dish which in fact contains not squab but mutton)
- Pastilla
