= Broomhill Hospital =

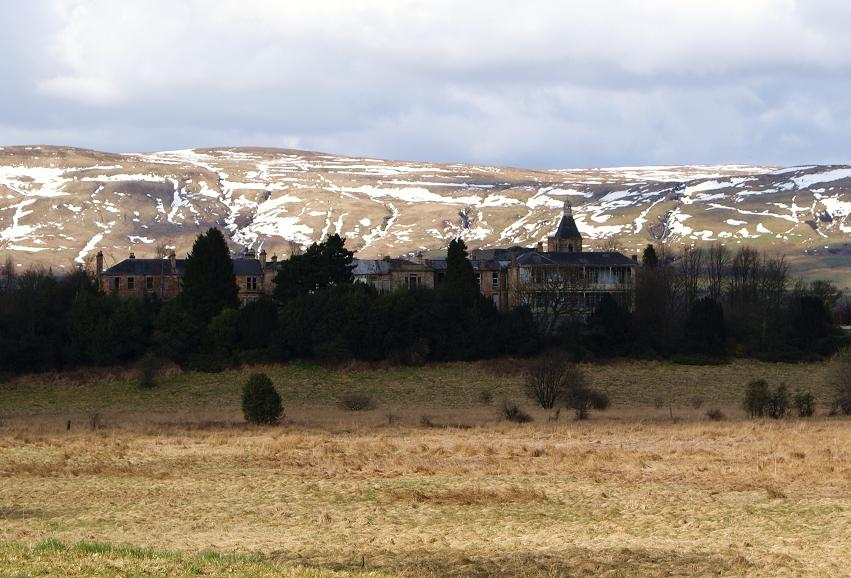
- The derelict hospital

- Location of the hospital in East Dunbartonshire

Geography
- Location: Kirkintilloch, East Dunbartonshire, Scotland
- Coordinates: 55.9466°N 4.1510°W

Organisation
- Care system: NHS
- Type: Geriatric hospital

History
- Founded: 1876
- Closed: 1995

Links
- Lists: Hospitals in Scotland

Broomhill Hospital was a health facility in Kirkintilloch, East Dunbartonshire, Scotland.

== History ==
The hospital, which was financed by a donation from Beatrice Clugston as a facility for incurable patients such as those with cancer, opened in 1876. The Lanfine Home for patients with tuberculosis was added in 1904. After joining the National Health Service in 1948, the hospital continued to care for chronically ill patients until it closed in 1995. The buildings, other than an old gatehouse, have been demolished and planning consent has been given for the site to be redeveloped for residential use.
