= Lorne sausage =

Traditional Scottish food item

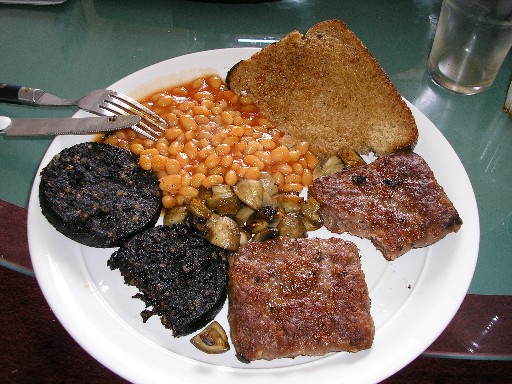
- Lorne sausage (lower right) served with black pudding, baked beans, mushrooms and fried bread
- Alternative names: Square sausage or slice
- Course: Breakfast
- Place of origin: Scotland
- Associated cuisine: Scottish
- Serving temperature: Hot
- Main ingredients: Minced meat, rusk, spices

The Lorne sausage, also known as square sausage or slice sausage, is a traditional Scottish food item made from minced meat, rusk and spices. Although termed a sausage, no casing is used to hold the meat in shape, hence it is usually served as square slices from a formed block. It is a common component of the traditional Scottish breakfast.

== Nomenclature ==
It is thought that the sausage is named after the region of Lorne in Argyll; advertisements for 'Lorne Sausage' have been found in newspapers as early as 1892. This was long before Scottish comedian Tommy Lorne, after whom the sausage has been said to be named, became well-known: he was born in 1890.

== History ==
The exact origins of the Lorne sausage remain unclear. It is often eaten in the Scottish variant of the full breakfast or in a morning roll. The sausage is also an appropriate size to make a sandwich using a slice from a plain loaf of bread cut in half.

== Preparation ==
Sausage meat (beef, pork or more usually a combination of the two) is minced with rusk and spices, packed into a rectangular tin with a cross-section of about ten centimetres (four inches) square, and sliced about one centimetre (one-half inch) thick before cooking. Square sausage has no casing, unlike traditional sausages, and must be tightly packed into the mould to hold it together; slices are often not truly square.

== See also ==
- List of sausages
- Sassermaet
- Breakfast sausage
- Scrapple
- Goetta
