= Squab pie =

English meat pie

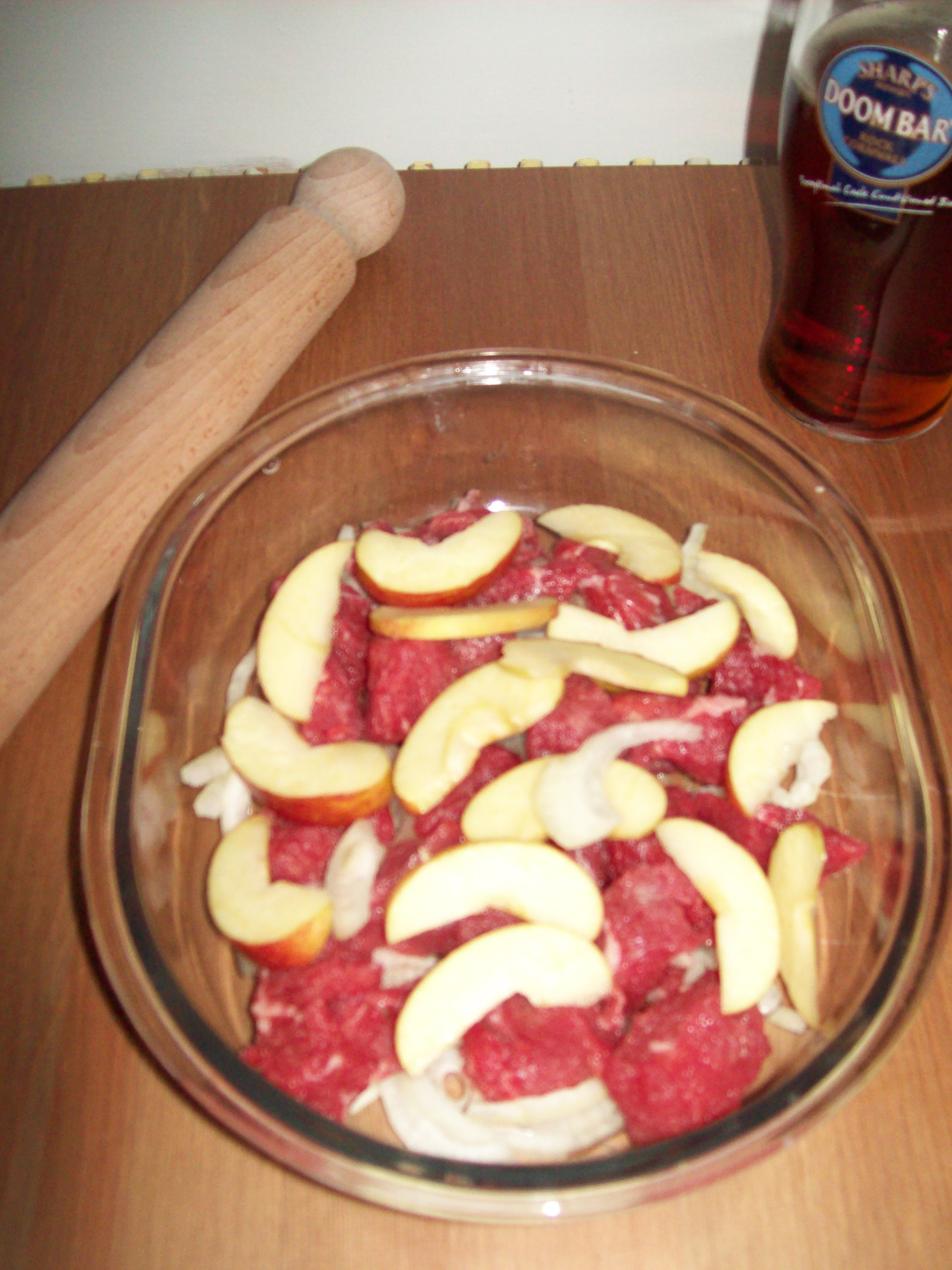
- A squab pie in preparation, before the pastry lid is added
- Course: Main
- Place of origin: United Kingdom
- Region or state: South West England
- Serving temperature: Hot
- Main ingredients: Lamb, Apples

Squab pie is a traditional dish from South West England, with early records showing it was associated with Cornwall, Devon and Gloucestershire. Although the name suggests it contains squab (young domestic pigeon), in fact it contains mutton and apples. The pie was eaten around the world in the 1900s, though outside South West England it generally did contain pigeon.

== Origins ==
Although it is not known exactly where squab pie was first made, it is clear that it was somewhere in South West England. There are references to it originating in Gloucestershire, Devon and Cornwall. Although it appears that squab pie did originally contain pigeons, mutton and apples have been used as a substitute since at least 1737 using a recipe that has remained in cookbooks for years afterwards. This misnaming has meant that the pie is considered to be a surprise. Squab is described as tender with a mild berry flavour, and so it is possible that the combination of mutton and apples created a similar flavour. There is also a theory that the name squab pie is short for "squabble pie", as it stems from a disagreement over whether to have a meat or apple pie.

There are many variations to the squab pie in England, although it traditionally includes mutton, it has come to mean a pie with many ingredients or a "scraps pie". Squab pie in Devon can be served with clotted cream. Alternatively, in America, it is cooked with squab, and is synonymous with pigeon pie.

== Recipe ==
Squab pie is a mutton pie with a shortcrust pastry lid. It should be made with at least one layer of onions, followed by alternating layers of sliced apples and mutton chops. The mixture should be covered with water, though less than in some pies, covered with pastry and baked in the oven for about two hours.

=== Variations ===
Within the UK, the most common variation is to use lamb, instead of mutton. Gloucester Squab pie did not require lamb and suggests any leftover meat could be used. Other ingredients can be included, for example Agatha Christie produced a variant which included hard-boiled eggs and another recipe took the concept of serving with clotted cream and adds cream to thicken.

Outside of England, the concept of squab pie does exist, but in a more literal form actually containing squab. Known as Piccioni All'Inglese, one Italian chef explains that he is aware that the recipe does not match the traditional English version, but he "[does] not care a fig". In America, squab pie still uses squab. It was included in a "Cooking for profit" book in San Francisco, to make a pie using 18 squabs in a gravy.

== Reaction ==
In 2009, less than 3% of British teenagers had tried the dish and it has been listed amongst the "at risk" British Classics. A prominent critic of squab pie was Charles Dickens' journal All the Year Round:

Of all the west country pies, squab pie is, in our humble estimation, the most incongruous and the most detestable. The odious composition is made of fat clumsy mutton chops, embedded in layers of sliced apples, shredded onions, and — O tempora! O mores! — brown sugar! The result is nausea, unsociability, and, in course of time, hatred of the whole human race. The greasy sugary, oniony taste is associated, in our mind, with the detested name of Bideford.

— Charles Dickens & Wilkie Collins, All the Year Round

Using its many ingredients definition, squab pie was used by Gallynipper as an analogy for New York City. This is a positive comparison, explaining that New York does "not smell bad... nor look uninviting" and that it is "a wonder and a success".

=== Poetry ===
Then in parts minutely nice
Soft and fragrant apples slice
With its dainty flesh, the sheep
Next must swell the luscious heap
Then the onions savory juice
Sprinkle not with hand profuse

— A gentleman of Bodmin, 1846

Squab pie has been the subject of poetry. In "The Squab-Pie. A Devonshire Tale" published in 1827, John Taylor uses verse to tell of the captain of a ship in Plymouth who forgot to get meat for his trip. A boy on the ship goes into town to claim a large squab pie from the bakery for a penny, though it was not meant to be his. Set on a Sunday, the family who had commissioned the pie from the baker, in order to avoid cooking, try to find it, but to no avail. Taylor explains the moral is that if you believe it is a sin to cook on a Sunday, you should not be still having a big meal by getting a baker to cook for you.

The ingredients are given in verse by a Cornishman from Bodmin, during William Sandys's 1846 tour around Cornwall. Sandys also includes a story of Christmas-time in Cornwall which includes the pie served with mashed potatoes and pilchards. In "Verses Occasioned by Ben Tyrrell's Mutton Pies", published in 1772, Thomas Warton also confirmed that the squab pie was mutton based and came from Cornwall. The Devon author, William Crossing, writing in 1911, discusses a short folk rhyme about squab pie: "Mutton, onions, apples and dough, Make a good pie as any I know." He does not say, however, from where he heard it. In the song "Glorious Devon" written by Sir Edward German in 1905, several Devonshire dishes receive praise: "Squab pie, junket and cider brew, Richest cream of the cow, What 'ud Old England without 'em do?"

=== Devil in Cornwall ===
Another legend surrounding squab pie, along with the other unusual pies of Cornwall, is that they were the reason that the Devil never came to Cornwall.

In his book Popular Romances of the West of England; or, The drolls, traditions, and superstitions of old Cornwall, a collection of Cornish traditions, Robert Hunt explains that the Devil crossed the River Tamar to Torpoint. The chapter, entitled "The Devil's Coits, etc.", reasons that the Devil discovered the Cornish would put anything in a pie and decided to leave before they took a fancy to a "devilly" pie, returning to Devon.

== See also ==
- List of lamb dishes
- List of pies, tarts and flans
- Fidget pie — another English pie containing meat and apples

== Sources ==
- Baldock, Dorothy, Favourite Cotswold Recipes, J. Salmon Ltd. (1996), ISBN 978-1-898435-07-5
