= Kirkintilloch =

Town in East Dunbartonshire, Scotland

Coordinates: 55.938°N 4.155°W

Kirkintilloch: Scottish Gaelic: Cair Cheann Tulaich; Scots: Kirkintulloch
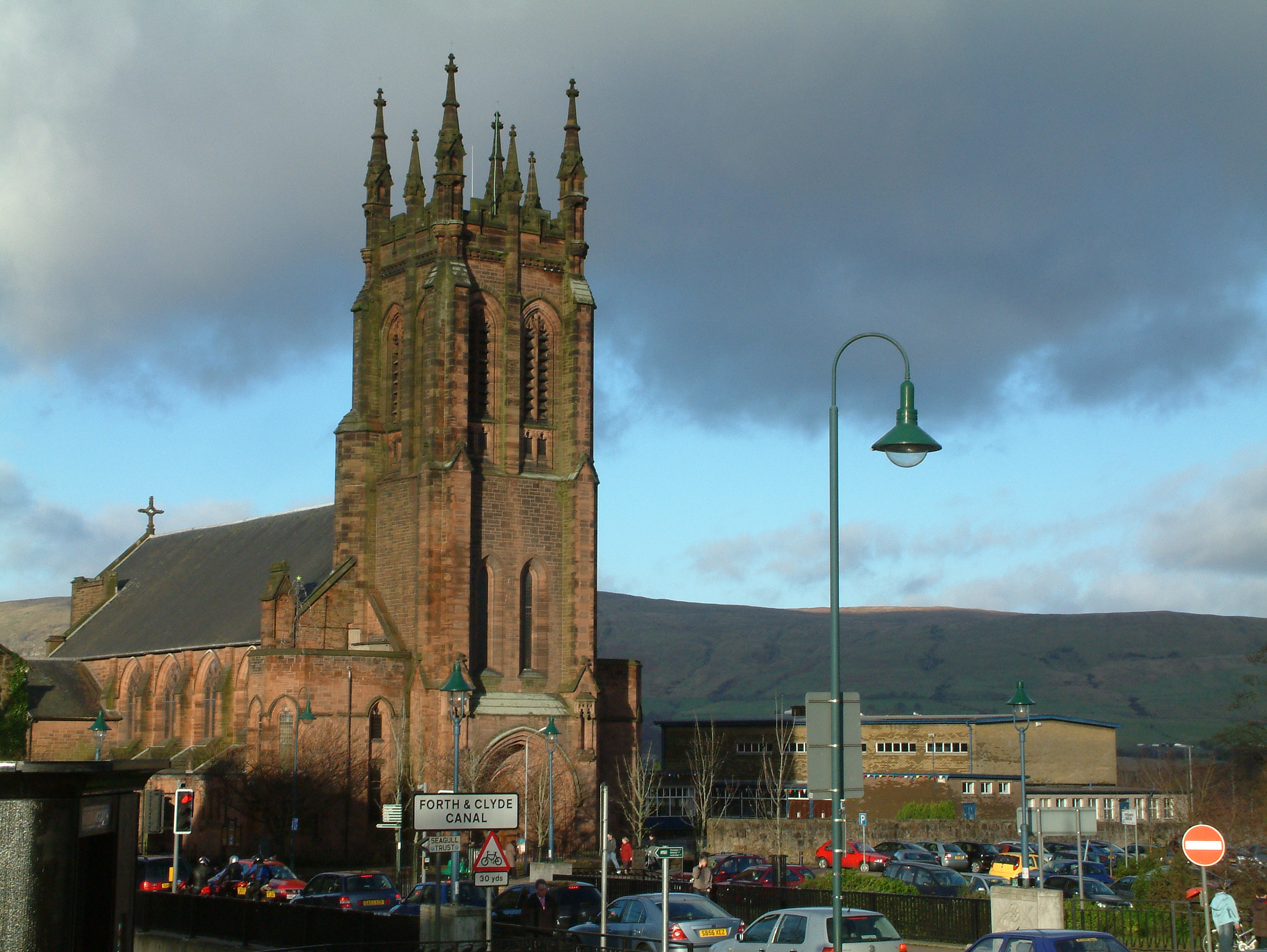
- St Mary's Church in Kirkintilloch's Cowgate

- Location within East Dunbartonshire Kirkintilloch (East Dunbartonshire)
- Population: 21,870 (2020)
- OS grid reference: NS655735
- Council area: East Dunbartonshire
- Lieutenancy area: Dunbartonshire
- Country: Scotland
- Sovereign state: United Kingdom
- Post town: Glasgow
- Postcode district: G66
- Dialling code: 0141
- Police: Scotland
- Fire: Scottish
- Ambulance: Scottish
- UK Parliament: Cumbernauld and Kirkintilloch; East Dunbartonshire
- Scottish Parliament: Strathkelvin and Bearsden

Kirkintilloch (/ˌkɜːrkɪnˈtɪləx/; Scots: Kirkintulloch; Scottish Gaelic: Cair Cheann Tulaich) is a town and a Burgh of Barony (The Baron of Kirkintilloch) in East Dunbartonshire, Scotland. It lies on the Forth and Clyde Canal and on the south side of Strathkelvin, about 8 miles (13 km) northeast of central Glasgow. Historically part of Dunbartonshire, the town is the administrative home of East Dunbartonshire council area, its population in 2009 was estimated at 19,700 and its population in 2011 was 19,689.

== Toponymy ==
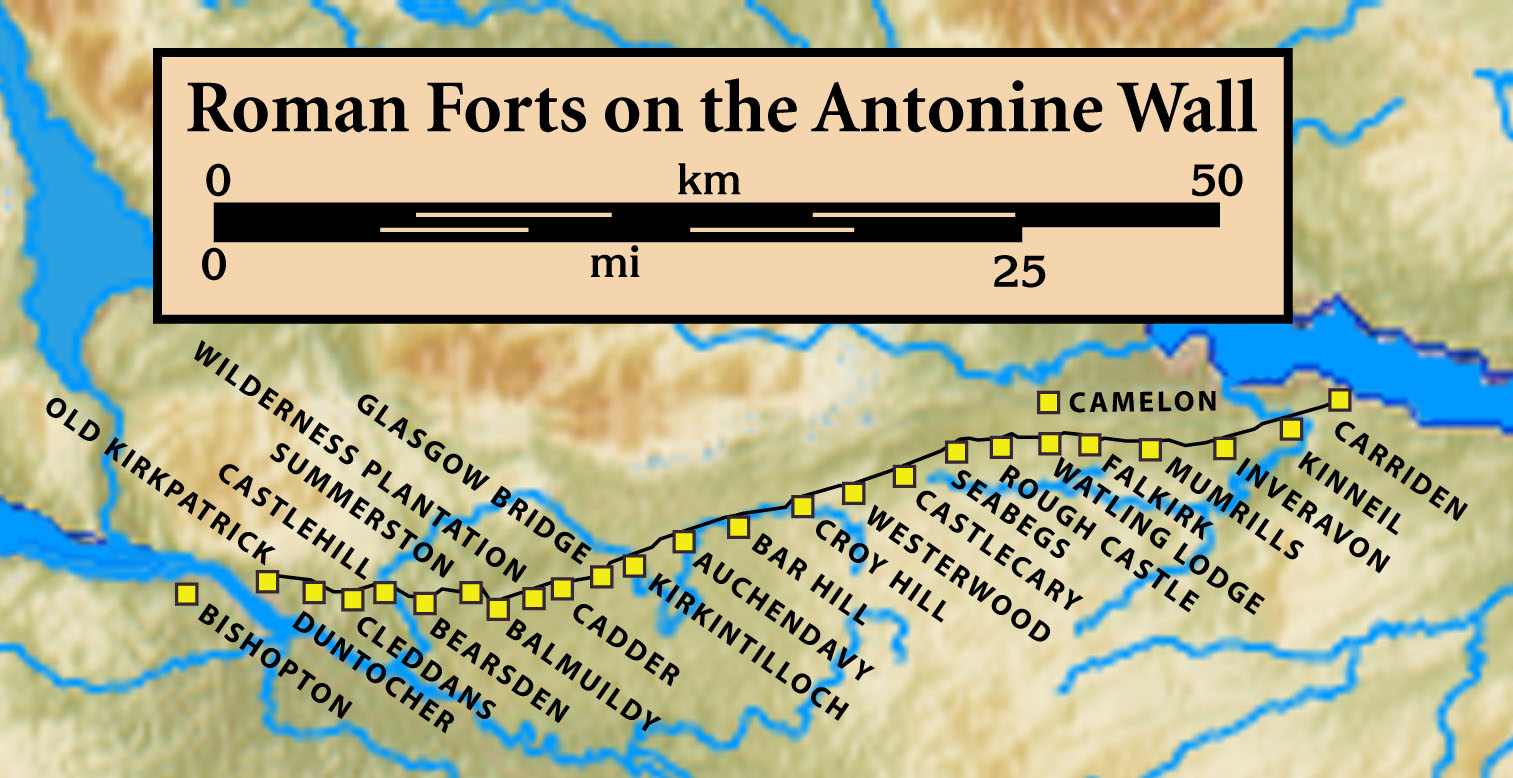
Forts and Fortlets associated with the Antonine Wall from west to east: Bishopton, Old Kilpatrick, Duntocher, Cleddans, Castlehill, Bearsden, Summerston, Balmuildy, Wilderness Plantation, Cadder, Glasgow Bridge, Kirkintilloch, Auchendavy, Bar Hill, Croy Hill, Westerwood, Castlecary, Seabegs, Rough Castle, Camelon, Watling Lodge, Falkirk, Mumrills, Inveravon, Kinneil, Carriden

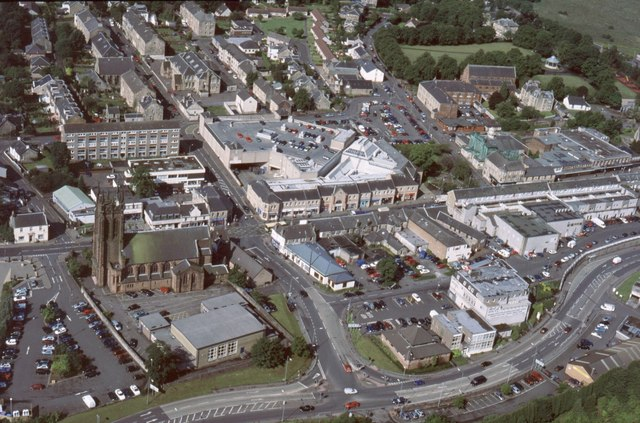
Aerial view of Kirkintilloch

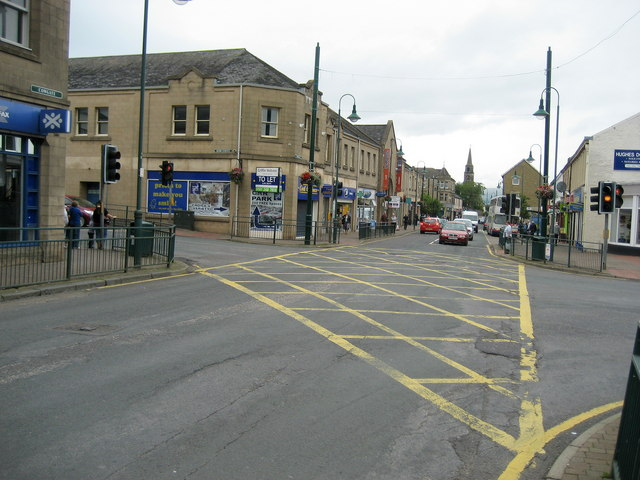
Cowgate

"Kirkintilloch" comes from the Gaelic Cair Cheann Tulaich or Cathair Cheann Tulaich, meaning "fort at the end of the hill". This, in turn, may come from a Cumbric name, Caer-pen-taloch, which has the same meaning. A possible reference to the site is made in the 9th century Welsh text Historia Brittonum, in which the Antonine Wall is said to end at 'Caerpentaloch'. The fort referred to is the former Roman settlement on the wall and the hillock is the volcanic drumlin which would have offered a strategic viewpoint for miles to the West, North and East. The etymology is sometimes taken literally as "Kirk in tilloch" ("church in the field"). Its long name is often shortened by locals to the colloquial Kirkie or Kirky, as reflected in a number of business names in the town.

== History ==
The first known settlement on the site of what is now Kirkintilloch was a Roman fort established in what is now the Peel Park area of the town. Dating from the mid-2nd century, the Antonine Wall, one of the northernmost frontiers in Roman Britannia was routed through Kirkintilloch; its course continues through the centre of the town to this day, although little trace can now be seen above ground. A digital reconstruction of the fort has been created. There are many archeological artifacts found in Kirkintilloch on display at the Hunterian Museum in Glasgow. There is no strong evidence of habitation on the site for the following thousand years until Clan Cumming established a castle (Motte and Bailey) and church there in the 12th century. A small settlement grew and was granted burgh status in 1211, becoming an important staging post for west–east journeys from Glasgow to eastern and north-eastern Scotland. From this time, a weekly market was held in the town, probably at the foot of Peel Brae (along with High Street and Cowgate, one of the three medieval thoroughfares in the town).

The castle was of some importance during the wars of independence when an English garrison was stationed there, commanded by Sir Philip de Moubray, who was later to command Stirling Castle at the time of the Battle of Bannockburn. Soldiers from the castle were dispatched to arrest William Wallace at Robroyston in 1305 and escorted him to Dumbarton Castle. Later the same year, the garrison is recorded as having sent a petition to King Edward of England complaining of non-payment of wages. The castle was attacked by Scottish forces in 1306 under Bishop Wishart of Glasgow (using timber given to Glasgow diocese by the English for cathedral repairs), but the siege was unsuccessful. The castle is thought to have been destroyed on the orders of Robert Bruce later in the conflict, although the traces of a mot surrounded by a ditch can still be seen in the Peel Park.

The original Cumming parish church, St Ninian's, was constructed around 1140 some distance to the east of the town (where some of the stones remain in the form of an 18th-century watchtower at the entrance to the Auld Aisle Cemetery) as Kirkintilloch was originally in the parish of Lenzie which stretched from Cumbernauld in the East to Kirkintilloch in the West. The establishment was part of the endowment of Cambuskenneth Abbey, and was accompanied by a grant of one oxgang of land (approximately 15 acres), the measurement that lent its name to the area near the church. A chapel to the Virgin Mary was established in the town itself, sometime before 1379, and was endowed with land at Duntiblae by Sir David Fleming. The move of the parish church to the site of the chapel at Kirkintilloch Cross (now the Auld Kirk Museum) in 1644 resulted in a split of the Parish into Easter and Wester Lenzie (later Cumbernauld and Kirkintilloch Parishes) The name Lenzie was later reused for Kirkintilloch's railway station on the main Glasgow to Edinburgh line, around which the later village of that name developed.

Following the Scottish victory in the wars of independence and the subsequent decline of Clan Cumming, the baronies of Kirkintilloch, Lenzie, and Cumbernauld were granted by Robert Bruce to Sir Malcolm Fleming, sheriff of Dumbarton and a supporter of the Bruce faction in the war. Hitherto part of Stirlingshire, the area subsequently became a detached part of the county of Dumbarton, in which it remains today.

On 3 January 1746, the retreating Jacobite army of Charles Stuart made its way through Kirkintilloch, on its way back from Derby, and on the march to Falkirk and ultimately Culloden. One of the Highland army's stragglers was shot dead at the town cross by a man hidden in a barn at the Kiln Close (where the library now stands). On hearing of the murder, Charles halted his army on the Kilsyth road and threatened to turn back and burn the town. The town magistrates persuaded him to continue marching, in return for an unspecified payment, and the town was spared.

The town was one of the hotbeds of the Industrial Revolution in Scotland, beginning with the emergence of a booming textile industry in the area. There were 185 weavers in Kirkintilloch by 1790, and in 1867 James Slimon's cotton mill at Kelvinside employed 200 women. With the construction of the Forth and Clyde Canal through the town in 1773, and the establishment of the Monkland and Kirkintilloch Railway in 1826, Kirkintilloch developed further as an important transportation hub, inland port and production centre for iron, coal, nickel and even small ships. This industrial heritage lives on in the town's designation as the "Canal Capital of Scotland", and in the redevelopment of the canal and surrounding former industrial sites in the early 21st century.

By the 20th century, the principal employers in the town were the shipbuilders J & J Hay and Peter McGregor, and the Lion (1880–1984) and Star foundries, all of which produced goods for the domestic market and for export around the world. Kirkintilloch's most famous exports were the distinctive red British post boxes and phone boxes K2 to K6, produced in the town until 1984.

In the 1930s Kirkintilloch was a location for Irish seasonal workers; it has been estimated that a quarter of the inhabitants were then of Irish descent. On 15 September 1937 ten young migrant potato pickers from Achill in Ireland died in a fire at Kirkintilloch.

Kirkintilloch was a "dry town" for much of its recent history, with the sale of alcohol on public premises banned from 1923 until 1967. The prohibition on the sale of alcohol had long been demanded by the Liberal Party and the temperance movement, both of which had a strong influence in the town in the early part of the 20th century, largely due to the perceived negative effects of alcohol on the town's inhabitants.

The 1960s development plan to redevelop inner city areas of Glasgow saw Kirkintilloch used as an overspill settlement for relocated Glaswegians in combination with the new towns of Livingston and Cumbernauld, offering employment in housebuilding and an increase to the local population to its current levels. Large numbers of new houses for owner occupation have been built since that time.

== Governance ==
Kirkintilloch and Lenzie had their own burgh council until the 1975 abolition of the counties of Scotland when it became part of the Strathkelvin local government district within the region of Strathclyde. A second reorganisation in 1996 established East Dunbartonshire council from Strathkelvin and the adjacent district of Bearsden and Milngavie, with Kirkintilloch is its administrative centre and the council's headquarters at Tom Johnston House in the town, named after prominent early 20th-century politician, Secretary of State for Scotland (1941–45) and Kirkintilloch native, Thomas Johnston. The council's headquarters moved to the William Patrick Library in August 2012, forming the local authority's first community hub. Tom Johnstone House was demolished in 2015, a mere 30 years after it was built.

== Geography ==
As well as the Forth and Clyde Canal the Luggie Water passes through Kirkintilloch, the canal crossing the Luggie on an aqueduct. The Luggie flows into the River Kelvin which in turn flows into the River Clyde in Glasgow.

Communities in and around Kirkintilloch include Cleddans, Harestanes, Hayston, Hillhead, Oxgang, Rosebank, Langmuir, Greens, Fauldhead, Waterside, Westermains, Lenzie, Gallowhill: Whitegates, Back O' Loch, Woodilee, and Broomhill.

== Culture ==
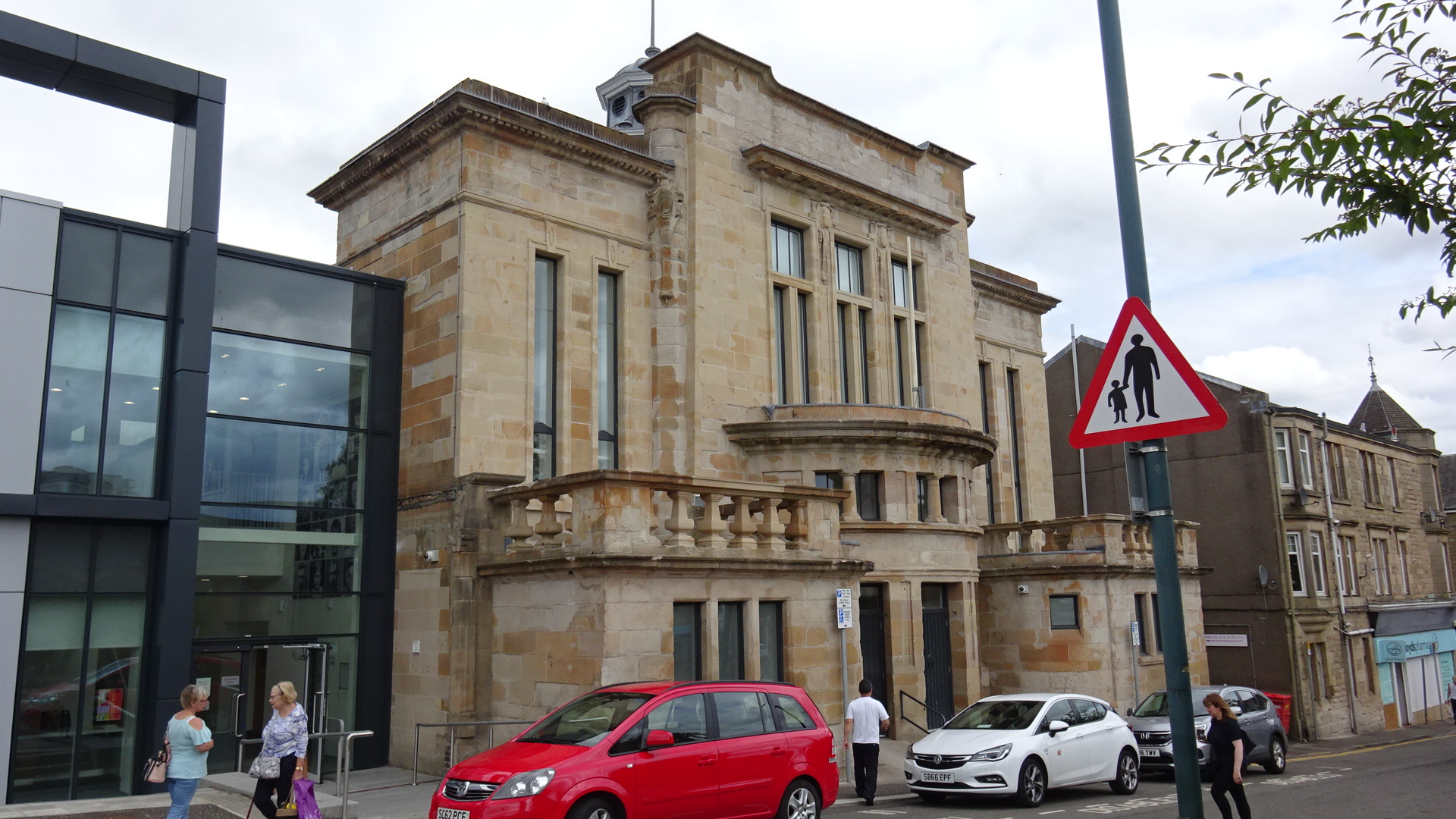
Kirkintilloch Town Hall

Kirkintilloch Town Hall was opened in 1906, paid for by public subscription. Listed as a building of special architectural or historic interest, it was closed by East Dunbartonshire Council in June 2004, largely due to the anticipated expense of restoring a building constructed of notoriously crumbling soft sandstone. In response the Kirkintilloch Town Hall Preservation Trust was established as a registered charity to preserve the hall and restore it for community use. Work began on the redevelopment of the hall in early summer 2016, with major works completed in October 2017. Kirkintilloch Town Hall officially reopened in November 2018.

The town is served by the William Patrick Library, which moved from a converted private villa near Peel Park to a new building on West High Street in the 1990s. The titular William Patrick was a local minister whose brother donated funds to the local people to have a library founded in William's name. The neglected old library was sold by the council back into private ownership and returned to residential use after restoration works. William Patrick Library is the main library for East Dunbartonshire Council and also houses the reference department and other council offices including social services, planning and a new community hub.

Kirkintilloch underwent significant population growth in the post-Second World War period, with several new amenities erected to cater for the growing population of the town and its surrounding villages. New shopping facilities were built in the Cowgate and Townhead areas, culminating in the opening, by Diana, Princess of Wales, of the Regent Centre shopping mall in the 1990s.

The local swimming pool and Community Education Centre, built in the 1960s and '70s in Woodhead Park to the south of the town, were demolished in 1999 and 2005 respectively. Woodhead Park was once home to a petting zoo, bandstand, greenhouses, putting green and public toilets. All are now closed, although a new leisure centre was opened on the same spot as the old pool in July 2007, providing facilities for tennis, badminton, swimming, football and a gymnasium. A large new children's play area has been created near the site of the former putting green in the park.

The construction of the new leisure centre came in combination with a wider-ranging artistic, cultural and social regeneration project called Kirkintilloch's Initiative. This includes the new link road largely funded by housebuilders developing on the site of the former Woodilee Hospital.

Kirkintilloch Learning Centre is located on Southbank Road, overlooking the Forth and Clyde Canal, an offshoot of Cumbernauld College.

Locally, a G66+ Live! Cultural festival offers a wide range of events from talks on history in local churches to musical events in the town's local bars. dramas and also entries from the schools in the G66 postcode area. G66+ Live! is annual festival taking place in June. Kirkintilloch's most successful musical ensemble is its brass band, the Kirkintilloch Band, who were crowned Scottish Brass Band Champions in 2007 and who have had success in competitions both in Scotland and further afield. Each August the local Canal Festival takes place.

An amateur theatre group, the Kirkintilloch Players, is based at the Turret Theatre in the Eastside area of Kirkintilloch, the former home of the town's Liberal Club.

The town has a pipe band of the same name, Kirkintilloch Pipe Band. Established on 12 November 1888, it takes part in civic and private events in the local and surrounding areas and also takes part in competition. Its pipers and drummers are mostly from the local area and the band still practises weekly in the Hillhead Community Centre.

== Education ==
There are six primary schools in Kirkintilloch, which are Hillhead, Holy Trinity, Harestanes, Oxgang, Gartconner, Lairdsland and Holy Family. There are also two schools in the area for children with special needs, these being Merkland School in Hillhead and Campsie View School in Lenzie.

The two secondary schools in the area are Kirkintilloch High School (Non-denominational) and St Ninian's High School (Roman Catholic) Both schools recently constructed new-build campuses, which were completed in August 2009.

In the Lenzie area primary schools include Lenzie Meadow Primary, Millersneuk and Holy Family Primary. Holy Family is a Catholic school on the edge of Lenzie on the border with Kirkintilloch, and is a feeder to St Ninian's High School. The other two non-denomination schools in the area feed onto Lenzie Academy, along with Lairdsland Primary in Kirkintilloch and the nearby Auchinloch Primary.

== Media ==
The Kirkintilloch Herald is the local newspaper of record, established by town businessman Donald MacLeod in premises on the Cowgate in 1883.

== Notable people ==
- Moira Anderson, singer
- Alexander Bain, inventor of an electric clock, lived in Kirkintilloch in his latter days
- Joe Caven (born 1936), Scottish former footballer
- Beatrice Clugston, philanthropist (1827–1888)
- Archibald Scott Couper, chemist
- Andrew Crumey, novelist
- J. Dalrymple Duncan (1852–1908), author and antiquarian
- Joseph Devine, Roman Catholic bishop
- Walter Dick, professional footballer who earned one cap for the United States
- John Erskine, theologian
- James Fletcher, industrialist
- John Fletcher, politician in New Zealand
- Jimmy Gallagher, professional footballer who played for the United States
- Alasdair Graham (1934–2016), concert pianist
- David Gray, poet
- Tom Johnston, Labour politician
- David Lapsley, professional footballer
- Tommy Lorne, comedian
- Hugh McCartney, Labour politician
- Ian McCartney, Labour politician
- John Meikle, recipient of the Victoria Cross
- Macvey Napier, solicitor and editor of the Encyclopædia Britannica
- Billy Rankin, guitarist
- Rita Taketsuru (born Jessie Roberta Cowan), Japanese whisky pioneer
- Jim Watt, boxer

== Sport ==
The town has a football club, Kirkintilloch Rob Roy F.C., thrice winners of the Scottish Junior Cup, who formerly played at Adamslie Park in the west of the town, but now play the town's Community Sports Complex after years in exile in Cumbernauld, and is also home to the amateur Harestanes A.F.C., three-time winners of the Scottish Amateur Cup.

Lenzie RFC is based in the town, playing their home games at Viewfield Avenue. They are in West regional league 1, the 4th tier of Scottish club rugby.

After the town had been without such facilities for the better part of a decade a replacement swimming pool and gym finally opened in July 2007 at Woodhead Park. The town is also home to the "Kirkintilloch Olympians", a local athletics club.

Kirkintilloch is also the home of Aberdeen and former Rangers player Gregg Wylde and Celtic and Scotland player, Charlie Mulgrew.

Lenzie Youth Club is a local football club founded in 1980 by Ian Stevenson which has sections from age 5 upwards. Famous ex Lenzie YC players include Barry Bannan and Stephen Crainey.

== Churches ==
There are a number of churches in Kirkintilloch. The four Church of Scotland congregations are: St Mary's and St David's Memorial Park in the town centre and St Columba's in Hillhead and Oxgang. The Baptist Union of Scotland has churches at Townhead and Harestanes. There are two Roman Catholic Churches - St Flannan's in Hillhead, and Holy Family and St Ninian's in the town centre. Jehovah's Witnesses have a congregation in Kirkintilloch which shares a Kingdom Hall with its sister congregation in Bishopbriggs.

== Twin town ==
- Yoichi, Hokkaido, Japan

== See also ==
- Thomas Muir (political reformer)
