= Beatrice Clugston =

Scottish philanthropist

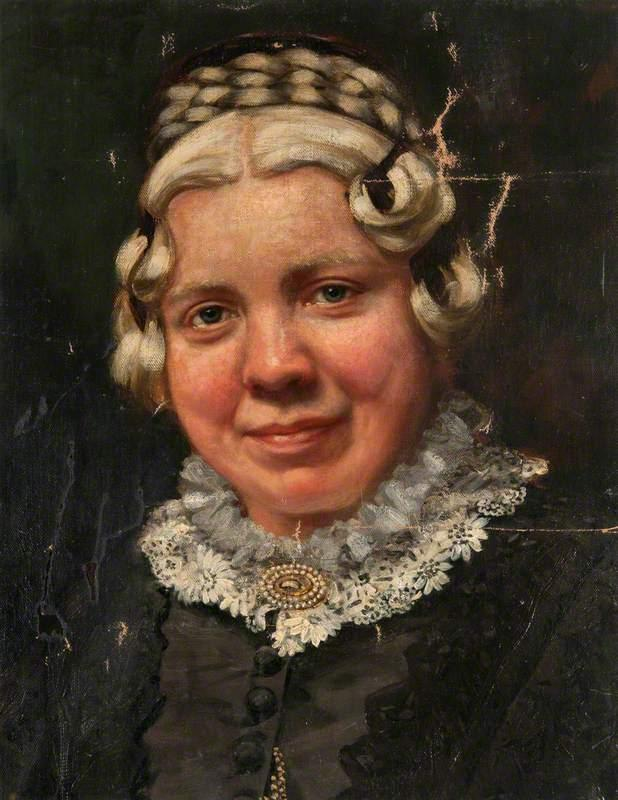
- Born: 19 September 1827; Glasgow, Scotland, United Kingdom of Great Britain and Ireland
- Died: 5 June 1888 (aged 60); Ardrossan, Scotland, United Kingdom of Great Britain and Ireland
- Occupation: philanthropist

Beatrice Clugston (19 September 1827 – 5 June 1888) was a British philanthropist in Glasgow.

== Early life ==
Clugston was born in Glasgow in 1827. She was raised in Glasgow to parents Mary (born Mackenzie) and John Clugston. Her father was an accountant who in time would own John Clugston & Co. (Bleachers) in south-east Glasgow.

Clugston founded the Glasgow Royal Dorcas Society in 1863 or 1864. The Dorcas Society would make sure that those leaving hospital had sufficient clothes and they would also give them some money to help see them through their recovery. Anyone who would not get any visitors would get a visit from someone from the society to check they were okay.

== Fundraising ==
Her remarkable talent was in fundraising where she invited the right people to the right events. At the Botanic Gardens she organised an event that raised £24,000. She raised money for the Samaritan Society of the Western Infirmary, Glasgow's Sick Children's Hospital and the local Magdalene Institution. In 1871 she ran an event at the City Hall and her supporters included Princess Louise, the duke and duchess of Argyll, the duke and duchess of Roxburghe making up twenty titled attendees.

Broomhill Hospital was financed by a donation from Clugston and the "Association for the Relief of Incurables in Glasgow and the West of Scotland" as a facility for incurable patients such as those suffering from cancer and it opened in 1876. The hospital would take those could not be cured and it would not accept paupers. The hospital expanded and in 1893 the hospital had a capacity for 100 patients

Clugston did not fare so well and in 1876 she was very poor. Despite this she would bring back home people who needed help. They would be fed but the food stores would be emptied. An appeal brought in £3,000 and an annuity was organised. Her mother was happy when they moved away from Glasgow as it stopped her daughter from offering more help.

== Death and legacy ==
Clugston died in Lenzie in 1888 and is buried in the Auld Aisle Cemetery. In 1891 a memorial to her was created at Broomhill hospital. That hospital would go on to expand further before closing finally in 1995.

Her legacy is now referenced in Beatrice Meadows, a new housing estate built on the grounds of where Broomhill Hospital stood, with Clugston Court the central street in the estate.

== Other Information ==
The tour company Gallus Pedals has named its bicycles after a number of famous Glaswegian women in various categories, Clugston is in the category "Leaders, Philanthropists and Community Builders" along with Isabella Elder.
