= John Gibson (painter) =

Scottish painter

- Born: 1768
- Died: 8 October 1852 (aged 83–84)
- Occupation: Painter

John Gibson (1768 – 8 October 1852) was a Scottish portrait painter.

== Biography ==
Gibson was a native of Glasgow, where he was largely employed. He contributed to the exhibition of the West of Scotland Academy. In October 1852, he took an active part on the committee engaged in hanging the pictures; he was subsequently present at the private view on 7 October, and attended the dinner afterwards. After returning home he revisited the exhibition gallery for some purpose, and was found lying dreadfully injured at the bottom of the stairs. He lingered till the following night, 8 October, when he died at an advanced age.
