= Kirkintilloch Herald =

Local newspaper in Scotland

- Type: Weekly newspaper
- Format: Tabloid
- Owner(s): National World
- Founded: 1883
- Headquarters: 11 Dalrymple Court; KIRKINTILLOCH; G66 3AA
- Circulation: 858 (as of 2023)
- Website: kirkintilloch-herald.co.uk

The Kirkintilloch Herald is a weekly tabloid newspaper serving the Kirkintilloch area of East Dunbartonshire, in Scotland. It is edited and printed in Kirkintilloch, and is known locally as the Kirky Herald. It also prints a Bishopbriggs edition.

== History ==
The newspaper was founded in 1883 in premises on the Cowgate by town businessman Donald MacLeod. It has been published by Johnston Press since the early 1970s.

== Editions ==
In addition to the main edition, there is one local sub-edition, sharing the same website:

- Bishopbriggs Herald

Both editions come out on Wednesdays.

== Campaigns ==
The paper has often been at the forefront of local causes, including a long-running but ultimately unsuccessful campaign to save accident and emergency and in-patient services at Stobhill Hospital.

== Editors ==
- Christine McPherson 1987 -2005
- Jim Holland 2005 -
