= National Dunking Association =

Doughnut promotion group

The National Dunking Association was a membership-based organization started by the Doughnut Corporation of America. It was established in the 1930s to help popularize doughnuts in North America.

At its peak, the association claimed millions of members across more than 300 chapters. Members included famous actors, athletes, political figures, and people of all ages.

== Activities ==
Members were encouraged to eat doughnuts using the Official Dunking Rules, a step-by-step method outlined by the organization. The lighthearted rules referred to dunking donuts as a sport and instructed members to break their donuts in half before swishing them rhythmically in coffee, cocoa, tea, or milk.

The association held various doughnut-focused events including an annual convention in New York City.

== Leadership ==
Presidents of the National Dunking Association included Jimmy Durante, Jack Lemmon, Red Skelton, Joey Bishop, and Johnny Carson. Bert Nevins served as the organization's vice president.

== Famous members ==
- Milton Berle
- Joey Bishop
- Judy Canova
- Johnny Carson
- Jimmy Durante
- Hoot Gibson
- Martha Graham
- Hildegarde
- Jack Lemmon
- Paul V. McNutt
- Uncle Don
- Zero Mostel
- Red Skelton

== Location ==
The National Dunking Association was located at 50 East 42nd Street in New York City.
