= Cake doughnut =

Doughnut type using cake batter

A cake doughnut (US) or baked doughnut (/ˈdoʊnət/) is a type of doughnut made from a special type of cake batter. Yeast and cake doughnuts contain most of the same ingredients, however, their structural differences arise from the type of flour and leavening agent used. In cake doughnuts, cake flour is used, and the resulting doughnut has a different texture because cake flour has a relatively low protein content of about 7 to 8 percent.

Crullers are a type of cake doughnut. Cake doughnuts can be glazed, powdered with confectioner's sugar, or covered with cinnamon and granulated sugar. They are also often topped with cake frosting and sometimes sprinkled with coconut, chopped peanuts, or sprinkles.

Cake doughnuts' oil content is generally between 20% and 25% compared to the fat content of yeast doughnuts, which may be between 25% and 35%. Extra fat in the form of shortening is included in the batter before cooking. Cake doughnuts may be baked or fried. When fried, cake doughnuts are typically cooked for a short time; 30 to 45 seconds at 375 °F (191 °C).

== History ==
Cake doughnuts first appeared in American cookbooks in the 1830s. In France during World War I, cake doughnuts became even more popular after the women served them to American soldiers at Salvation Army canteens.

At the same time, new donut shops were popping up all over the United States. There was a lot of effort at the time being put into streamlining donut production using machines. During this, the yeast donut was at a disadvantage. The yeast required it to have more time to rise, and it was more difficult to handle, so most bakers went the cake donut route. This was due to the baking soda being more predictable and an easier process to automate.
