= Laura Mason =

British food historian (1957–2021)

- Born: Laura Mason; 7 August 1957; Ilkley, Yorkshire, UK
- Died: 2 February 2021 (aged 63)
- Education: Ilkley Grammar School; Bradford College of Art; Leeds Polytechnic
- Occupation: Food historian
- Spouses: Ian Tomlin; Derek Johnson

Laura Mason (1957–2021) was a British food historian based in York. She studied home economics and food technology and published several books on cookery and its history.

== Early life and education ==
Mason was born in Ilkley on 7 August 1957 and attended Ilkley Grammar School. Her father was a farmer and her mother a local historian. She took a foundation course at Bradford College of Art and a degree in home economics and a further degree in food technology at Leeds Polytechnic.

== Career ==
Mason was appointed to an EU committee Euroterroirs in 1992. Its aim was to list national foods to extend the number covered by Protected Designation of Origin and Protected Geographical Indication. Mason explored foods in England and Wales while Catherine Brown looked at those in Scotland. Mason and Brown's research later underpinned the publication in 1997 of The Taste of Britain by Harper-Collins with a foreword by Hugh Fearnley-Whittingstall.

She published Sugar-Plums and Sherbert: a Prehistory of Sweets in 1998. As Alan Davidson's research assistant she wrote many of the articles in The Oxford Companion to Food (1999). She wrote several books for the National Trust: Farmhouse Cookery in 2005, and Book of Crumbles and Book of Afternoon Tea both in 2018, and Roasts in 2019. Her other publications included Sweets and Candy (2019) and Pine, about pine trees, in 2013.

== Personal life ==
Mason lived in York after moving there in 1976. She married Ian Tomlin, who died in 1982, and in 2012 married Derek Johnson. She died of cancer on 2 February 2021.

== Selected publications ==
- Mason, Laura (1999). Sweets and Sweet Shops. London: Shire Publications. ISBN 978-1911358473.
- Mason, Laura; Brown, Catherine (1999). Traditional Foods of Britain: An Inventory. Totnes: Prospect Books. ISBN 0907325874.
- Mason, Laura; Brown, Catherine (2006). The Taste of Britain. London: Harper Press. ISBN 9780007241323. First published in Great Britain as: Traditional Foods of Britain, by Prospect Books: 1999
- Mason, Laura (1998). Sugar-plums and Sherbet: The Prehistory of Sweets. Prospect Books. ISBN 978-0907325833.
- Mason, Laura; Brown, Catherine (1999) From Bath Chaps to Bara Brith. Totnes: Prospect Books
- Mason, Laura; From Eccles Cake to Hawkshead Wig: A Celebration of Northern Food. London: Harper, 2007
- Mason, Laura; Bedfordshire Clangers to Lardy Cake: Traditional Foods from the South and South East. London: Harper, 2007
