= Catherine Brown (food writer) =

Scottish food writer

Catherine Brown (1941–2024) was a Scottish food writer, who documented the cooking of Scotland and its culinary history in books, newspapers and magazines.

Brown was born in Glasgow, and spent her early career as a cook and culinary history researcher. In a stint working as a chef in the Loch Torridon Hotel, Brown cooked and promoted Scottish cooking, serving dishes such as venison tripe and a stag head broth. In the 1980s, Brown began a career in food writing, which she continued in into the 2010s. Her food writing involved work as the food correspondent for The Glasgow Herald, writing restaurant reviews for the Scottish Field, and writing and co-writing a series of books on Scottish cookery.

Brown supported localism and independent food retailers, and was concerned with the uptake of genetically modified food. She promoted these views in her writing, and through her advocacy succeeded in getting Dundee cake protected geographic status. Upon her death, the BBC eulogised that Brown had played a significant role in shifting public perception of Scottish food from being dominated by deep-fry cooking to being centred on "cooking with the best natural ingredients".

== Early life and career ==
Catherine Brown was born Catherine Grace Braithwaite in Glasgow on 20 August 1941 to Barclay Braithwaite, a civil engineer, and Catherine Braithwaite. She was raised in the city's Dennistoun district in a small tenement, attending Hutchesons' Grammar School. From her mother and maternal grandmother, Brown learned to cook, and at age 16 took on a job at a canteen on the River Clyde, serving breakfast fare to dockworkers.

Following Hutchesons', Brown attended the Glasgow and West of Scotland College of Domestic Science (now merged into Glasgow Caledonian University), before beginning a series of jobs as a cooking instructor and chef, including a stint at the Loch Torridon Hotel. There, Brown focused on promoting Scottish cookery rather than the more typical French, transitioning menus from French into English, Scots and Gaelic. This was an unusual move at a time when Scottish cookery was held in little regard. Among the dishes she served included a broth made from the heads of stags shot on the property, and Pocha Buidhe, a dish of venison tripe which was well received by visitors from continental Europe. Reflecting on her time at the Hotel, Brown credited F. Marian McNeill's 1929 The Scots Kitchen as being particularly influential on her approach to Scottish cooking.

Following her time at the Loch Torridon Hotel, Brown returned to Glasgow to take on a researcher role at the University of Strathclyde, compiling recipes from across Britain. The final result was published in 1976 as British Cookery, a book edited by Lizzie Boyd.

== Public career ==
Brown began a career in food writing in the 1980s. The impetus was the encouragement of a publisher, who had overheard her on a radio program speaking excitedly on Scottish cookery. She assumed the role of food correspondent at The Glasgow Herald where she remained for the next twenty years and gained a public profile, and in 1981 published her first book with Scottish Regional Recipes.

Over the course of her writing career she published 14 books. Her 1985 book Scottish Cookery was published across four editions, and Broths to Bannocks: Cooking in Scotland 1690 to the Present Day (1990), which was published in a second edition in 2010. Among the books she published was an edition of McNeill's The Scots Kitchen, which Brown edited and wrote an introduction for. With Laura Mason, she wrote the Traditional Foods of Britain, contributing writing on foods of Scotland. The book, part of the European Union's broader Euroterroirs initiative, was later reworked by HarperCollins into Taste of Britain (2006). Through her role as culinary advisor for the 2010 book Maw Broon's Cooking with the Bairns, she was given the status of "Auntie Catherine" in The Broons, a long-running comic strip in Scotland.

History was a dominant theme in Brown's food writing. Citing a comment on the history of porridge, Nigel Slater of the Guardian credited Brown as "Scotland's most respected cookery writer". In 2009, Brown's identification of haggis as English in origin gained attention in the press, and was described in her obituary in The Times as starting a "nationwide debate".

In her writing and work, Brown advocated for Scottish food and for a localist ethic, promoting the restaurants and producers of Scotland to her audiences. She was concerned with the uptake of genetically modified food, and believed consumers were being overly reliant on supermarkets to source their food and should shop more often at independent retailers. Much of this was argued in restaurant reviews that she wrote for the Scottish Field over a twelve year period. Her advocacy was also acted out through her role as television presenter in the 1998 food travel series Scotland’s Larder, alongside the British journalist Derek Cooper, and in writing travel guides. In 2014, her work in getting Dundee cake protected geographic status succeeded. In reporting on her death, the BBC credited Brown with playing a major role in a reputation shift of Scottish food from something dominated by deep frying, to a cuisine defined by "cooking with the best natural ingredients".

== Personal life and death ==
Catherine Braithwaite became Catherine Brown through her marriage to Iain Brown. Together, they had had at least two daughters, and when they divorced, she kept the name Brown. Influenced by her time working on Loch Torridon, she purchased a house there, and split her time in her last few years between there and a place on the Isle of Arran. She died on 28 November 2024, after living with dementia for several years.

== Bibliography ==
- Brown, Catherine (1981). Scottish Regional Recipes. Glasgow: Molendinar.
- Brown, Catherine (1985). Scottish Cookery. Glasgow: Richard Drew.
- Brown, Catherine (1990). Broths to Bannocks: A History of Cooking in Scotland from 1690 to the Present Day. London: John Murray.
- Whyte, Hamish; Brown, Catherine, eds. (1995). A Scottish Feast: An Anthology of Food and Eating. Glendaruel: Argyll.
- Brown, Catherine (1996). A Year in a Scots Kitchen: Celebrating Summer's End to Worshipping Its Beginning. Glascow: Neil Wilson Publishing.
- Brown, Catherine (2002). The Baker’s Tale. Glasgow: Neil Wilson Publishing.
- Brown, Catherine (2004). Classic Scots Cookery. Glasgow: Angels' Share.
- Mason, Laura; Brown, Catherine (2006) [1999 as Traditional Foods of Britain]. The Taste of Britain. London: Harper Press.
- Brown, Catherine (2010). Maw Broon's Cooking with Bairns: Recipes and Basics to Help Kids Learn to Cook. Glasgow: Waverley Books.
- Brown, Catherine (2011). Scottish Seafood: Its History and Cooking. Edinburgh: Birlinn Ltd.

== See also ==
- List of cookbook writers
