= Fiona =

Feminine given name

- Pronunciation: /fiˈoʊnə/ fee-OH-nə
- Gender: Feminine
- Language: English

Origin
- Language: Gaelic
- Derivation: fionn
- Meaning: White and fair
- Region of origin: Ireland and Scotland

Other names
- Related names: Fionnghal, Fíona, Gwen, Gwenn, Wynne

Fiona is a feminine given name of Gaelic origins. It means white or fair, while the Irish name Fíona means 'of wine', being the genitive of fíon 'wine'. It was first used by the Scottish writer James Macpherson in his Ossianic poems. Initially, the name was confined to Scotland but later it gained popularity in other countries, such as Liechtenstein, Switzerland, Australia, Germany and Canada.

== Etymology ==
Fiona originates from the Gaelic word fionn, meaning white or fair, being a Romantic Era Latinised form; or an Anglicisation of the Irish name Fíona (Scotland Fìona) meaning 'of wine', being the genitive of fíon (Scotland fìon) 'wine', from which is also derived the terms (Irish) fíniúin, (Irish, Scottish) crann fíona (crann 'tree'), and (Scottish) craobhfhìona (craobh 'tree, bush') 'grape-vine'. An alternative suggested by Hanks (2006) is that Fíona means vine. In ninth-century Welsh and Breton language Fion (today: ffion) referred to the foxglove species and is also a female given name as in Ffion Hague.

It was first used outside of literature by the Scottish writer William Sharp when he wrote under the pseudonym Fiona Macleod. Sharp may have drawn inspiration from the Gaelic variation of the name Catherine, namely Caitrìona. Fiona carries connotations of gentility and refinement, often suggesting aristocratic lineage for its bearer. Fiona is commonly shortened to Fi, with other variations including Fina, Fee, and Tiona.

Equivalents of the name Fiona in other languages include Gwenn in Breton, Gwen, and Wynne in Welsh. Masculine equivalents include Fion, Fionn, Finnán, Finnén, Finn, Gwyn and Wyn. The Scottish Gaelic feminine name Fionnghal is also sometimes equated with Fiona.

== Popularity ==
Initially, the name remained largely confined to Scotland until the latter part of the 20th century when it gained popularity in other parts of Britain, Australia, and Canada. Additionally, the Ossianic poems of James Macpherson helped to familiarize the name in the English-speaking world. It experienced a surge in popularity during the latter half of the 1960s.

It was the 439th most popular female name in Scotland in 2023. Fiona was the 71st most popular name for baby girls born in 2023 in Germany. The name was the most common female name in the ranking of most popular names for baby girls born in Liechtenstein in 2022. In 2023, in Switzerland, Fiona was the 66th most popular name. In Australia it is the 138th most popular baby name since the 1930s. In New Zealand it was particularly popular during the 1960s until around 1980. In Canada, it was the 154th most popular baby girl name in 2014 at the height of its recent popularity. In the US most girls named Fiona were born in the 21st century and the number of Fionas born per year was greater than 1,000 from 2009 until 2021. In the US, it has ranked among the top 1,000 most popular names for girls since 1990 and among the top 500 since 1999.

== People with the given name ==
- Fiona Adams (1935–2020), British photographer
- Fiona Allen (born 1965), English comedian and actress
- Fiona Alpass, New Zealand academic
- Fiona Apple (born 1977), American singer
- Fiona Argyle, Australian politician
- Fiona Baan (1938–1994), Scottish-born American sports administrator
- Fiona Balfour (born 1958), Australian business executive
- Fiona Bloom, music industry publicist
- Fiona Bruce (born 1964), BBC presenter
- Fiona Button, English actress
- Fiona Campbell (alpine skier) (1929–2005), British alpine skier
- Fiona Campbell (cricketer) (born 1981), Scottish cricketer
- Fiona Campbell (mezzo-soprano), Australian opera singer
- Fiona Campbell-Walter (born 1932), British model
- Fiona Kumari Campbell (born 1963), Australian disability studies researcher and theorist
- Fiona Clark (born 1954), New Zealand photographer
- Fiona Connor (born 1981), New Zealand artist
- Fiona Coyne (1965–2010), South African actress, author, playwright and presenter
- Fiona Crawley (born 2002), American tennis player
- Fiona Crombie (born c. 1973), Australian costume and production designer
- Fiona Davis (born 1966), Canadian author
- Fiona Dawson (born 1977), LGBT activist, writer, producer, and film director
- Fiona Dourif (born 1981), American actress
- Fiona Doyle (born 1991), Irish swimmer
- Fiona M. Doyle (born c. 1956), American scientist
- Fiona Dunbar (born 1961), English children's author and illustrator
- Fiona Edgar, New Zealand professor of management
- Fiona Fairhurst (born 1971), British inventor, designer of the Speedo Fastskin swimsuit
- Fiona Ferro (born 1997), French tennis player
- Fiona Flanagan (born 1961), American singer known mononymously as Fiona (singer)
- Fiona Fox (born 1964), British writer and chief executive
- Fiona Fullerton (born 1956), English actress
- Fiona Fung (born 1983), Hong Kong singer
- Fiona Fussi (born 1996), Singaporean fashion model and actress
- Fiona Gaunt (born 1947), English actress
- Fiona Gélin (born 1962), French actress
- Fiona Gell (born 1970s), Manx marine biologist and writer
- Fiona Geminder, Australian businessperson
- Fiona Givens, American writer, teacher, and speaker
- Fiona Glasscott (born 1982), Irish actress
- Fiona Godlee (born 1961), British-American journalist, first female editor of The British Medical Journal
- Fiona Graham (1961–2023), Australian anthropologist and geisha
- Fiona Gubelmann (born 1980), American actress
- Fiona Hammond (born 1983), Australian water polo player
- Fiona Highet, Scottish entomologist
- Fiona Hill (born 1965), British-American foreign affairs specialist and author
- Fiona Kennedy (born 1955), Scottish singer and actress
- Fiona Leggate (born 1980), British auto racing driver
- Fiona Lowry (born 1974), Australian painter
- Fiona MacDonald (born 1974), Scottish curler
- Fiona J. Mackenzie, Scottish Gaelic singer
- Fiona Macleod, pseudonym for English writer William Sharp
- Fiona Macpherson (born 1971), Scottish Philosopher
- Fiona Mactaggart (born 1953), British politician
- Fiona Mangan (born 1996), Irish road-cyclist
- Fiona May (born 1969), English-Italian athlete and actress
- Fiona McLeod Hill (born 1973), British political adviser
- Fiona McLeod (barrister) (born 1964), Australian barrister and Labor politician
- Fiona McFarlane (born 1978), Australian author
- Fiona Melrose (born 1973), South African novelist
- Fiona Millar (born 1958), British journalist and campaigner
- Fiona O'Donnell (born 1960), Scottish politician
- Fiona O'Driscoll, Irish camogie player
- Fiona O'Keeffe (born 1998), American long-distance runner
- Fiona O'Loughlin (comedian) (born 1963), Australian stand-up comedian
- Fiona O'Loughlin (politician) (born 1965), Irish politician
- Fiona O'Malley (born 1968), Irish politician
- Fiona O'Shaughnessy (born 1979), Irish actor
- Fiona O'Sullivan (born 1986), Irish footballer
- Fiona Onasanya (born 1983), British politician
- Fiona Peterson, Australian academic
- Fiona Phillips (born 1961), British journalist and broadcaster
- Fiona Pitt-Kethley (born 1954), British poet, novelist and journalist
- Fiona Richmond (born 1945), English glamour model
- Fiona Ritchie (born 1960), American broadcaster
- Fiona Robertson (born 1969), Scottish judoka and wrestler
- Fiona Robinson (sportswoman) (born 1969), Australian basketball and handball player
- Fiona Robinson (artist) (born 1949), British artist
- Fiona Scott Morton (born 1967), American economist
- Fiona Shaw (born 1958), Irish actress
- Fiona Sit (born 1981), Hong Kong singer
- Fiona Stanley, Australian epidemiologist and public health researcher
- Fiona Staples, Canadian comic book artist
- Fiona Urquhart (born 1987), Scottish cricketer
- Fiona Watt (author), British children's author
- Fiona Watt (born 1956), British scientist
- Fiona Wood (born 1958), Australian plastic surgeon and burns specialist
- Fiona Xie (born 1982), Singaporean television actress
- Fiona Yuen (born 1976), German-born Hong Kong model and actress
- Fiona Zedde (born 1976), Jamaican-born American fiction writer

=== Fictional characters ===
- Princess Fiona, the female lead in DreamWorks' Shrek franchise
- Fiona, in Dead or Alive Xtreme Venus Vacation
- Fiona Gallagher, daughter of Frank Gallagher in the British television series Shameless
- Princess Fiona, sorceress in The Chronicles of Amber novels

=== Animals ===
- Fiona (hippopotamus), (2017–2026)
