= Melrose (name) =

Melrose is both a surname and a given name. Notable people with the surname include:

== Surname ==
- Alex Melrose (1865–1944), South Australian lawyer and art patron
- Alexander Melrose (1889–1962), South Australian politician
- Barry Melrose (1956–2026), head coach of the National Hockey League's Tampa Bay Lightning & Los Angeles Kings
- Charles James Melrose (1913–1936), Australian aviator and holder of early flight records between Australia and other countries
- David Melrose, Scottish wheelchair curler
- Dianna Melrose (born 1952), British diplomat, ambassador to Cuba
- Fiona Melrose (born 1973), South African novelist
- George Melrose (1806–1894), pioneer in South Australia
- Graham Melrose (born 1949), Australian rules footballer
- Jim Melrose (born 1958), Scottish footballer
- Joseph Melrose (1944–2014), American diplomat who served as United States Ambassador to Sierra Leone
- Richard Burt Melrose (born 1949), Australian mathematician
- Robert Thomson Melrose (1862–1945), pastoralist and politician in South Australia

== Given name ==
- Melrose Bickerstaff, who appeared in America's Next Top Model season 7, which ran in 2006
