= Alex Melrose =

Australian lawyer (1865–1944)

Alexander Melrose (16 May 1865 – 2 September 1944) was a South Australian lawyer noted for his patronage of the arts.

== History ==
Alexander was a son of pastoralist George Melrose (1806–1894) and his wife Euphemia née Thomson (c. 1829–1887), who arrived in South Australia from Scotland in the Palmyra in 1839, who founded the "Rosebank" property in Mount Pleasant.

Alex was born in Australia and educated at Prince Alfred College, and studied law at the University of Adelaide. He was admitted as a barrister and solicitor in 1886, and practised his profession as partner with Robert Homburg then his son Hermann Homburg as Homburg & Melrose, Adelaide. until shortly before his death.

He was a talented writer, making many contributions to The Bulletin. He wrote several plays, which were produced by the Repertory Theatre, and in 1934 published Song and Slapstick, a collection of verse. He founded the Melrose Prize for literature. His 1917 play The Adventures of an Adventuress was produced in Adelaide and revived in Melbourne a few years later.

He was a connoisseur of fine art and member of the Libraries Board, which administered the Art Gallery. In 1928 he was deputised by the board to travel to Great Britain and purchase three paintings to fill gaps in the gallery's collection. In 1934 he gave £10,000 for an extension to the Art Gallery of South Australia, and endowed the Melrose Prize for portraiture, administered by the South Australian Society of Arts. He bequeathed his own valuable collection to the Gallery.

He was a member of the Botanic Garden Board, was president of the Royal Institution for the Blind from 1930 and vice-president of the Pioneers' Association from 1937.

For many years he was involved with the pastoral industry.

== Recognition ==
In 1936 he was awarded a medal by the Society of Artists in Sydney for services to Australian art.

The Melrose Gallery of the Art Gallery of South Australia, opened in 1937, was named at his request for his parents George and Euphemia Melrose.

== Family ==
Alex never married, and lived for many years at "Chiverton", Wattle Park, cared for by his niece, Alice Effie Ferguson ( –1949). His brothers were:

- George Thorburn Melrose (1855–1924)
- James Melrose (1857–1922), father of aviator "Jimmy" Melrose (1913–1936) and Clarice, who married lawyer Herbert Mayo, (later Mr Justice Mayo)
- Sir John Melrose (1860–1938), father of Alexander John Melrose MHA, MLC (1889–1962)
- Robert Thomson Melrose (1862–1945)

His sisters were:

- Jessie Melrose (ca.1848–1939) who married Dr. Hugh Ferguson MRCS JP. (ca.1832–1887)
- Elizabeth Thomson Melrose (ca.1856–1945), who married John Murray (ca.1849–1885), was mother of Sir John Stanley Murray (1884–1971), chairman of News Ltd.
- Lillie Margaret Melrose ( –1932), who married Dr. Henry Higham Wigg (1858–1950).

For more details on these family connections, see George Melrose.
