= Wigg (surname) =

Wigg is an English surname. Notable people with the surname include:

- Alexz Wigg (born 1989), English motorcycle racer
- Alfred Edgar Wigg (1857–1914), Australian surgeon
- Charles Mayes Wigg (1889–1969), English artist
- Edgar Smith Wigg (1818–1899), Australian stationer
- Edward Neale Wigg (1847–1927), Australian publisher and businessman
- George Wigg, Baron Wigg (1900–1983), British politician
- Lilly Wigg (1749–1828), English botanist
- Montagu Stone-Wigg (1861–1918), Anglican bishop
- Ron Wigg (1949–1997), English footballer
- Simon Wigg (1960–2000), English motorcycle racer

== See also ==
- Olaf Wiig, New Zealand journalist, victim of 2006 Fox journalists kidnapping
- Wigg (disambiguation)
- Wiggs (surname)
