= Wiggs =

Wiggs is a surname. Notable people with the surname include:

- Carson Wiggs (born 1990), American football player
- Emma Wiggs (born 1980), British paracanoeist and sitting volleyball player
- Ernie Wiggs (1940–2014), New Zealand rugby player
- Hubert Wiggs (1893–1977), American football player and coach
- Jimmy Wiggs (1876–1963), American baseball player
- Johnny Wiggs (1899–1977), jazz musician and band leader
- Josephine Wiggs (born 1963), English musician
- Pete Wiggs (born 1966), English musician and DJ
- Richard Wiggs, environmental activist, founder of Anti-Concorde Project
- Susan Wiggs, American romance novelist

== See also ==
- Mrs. Wiggs of the Cabbage Patch, 1901 novel by American author Alice Hegan Rice
  - Mrs. Wiggs of the Cabbage Patch (1919 film)
  - Mrs. Wiggs of the Cabbage Patch (1934 film)
  - Mrs. Wiggs of the Cabbage Patch (1942 film)
- Twiggs (disambiguation)
- Wigg (disambiguation)
- Wigg (surname)
- Wiggins (disambiguation)
