= Hyper Japan =

Anime convention in the United Kingdom

HYPER JAPAN
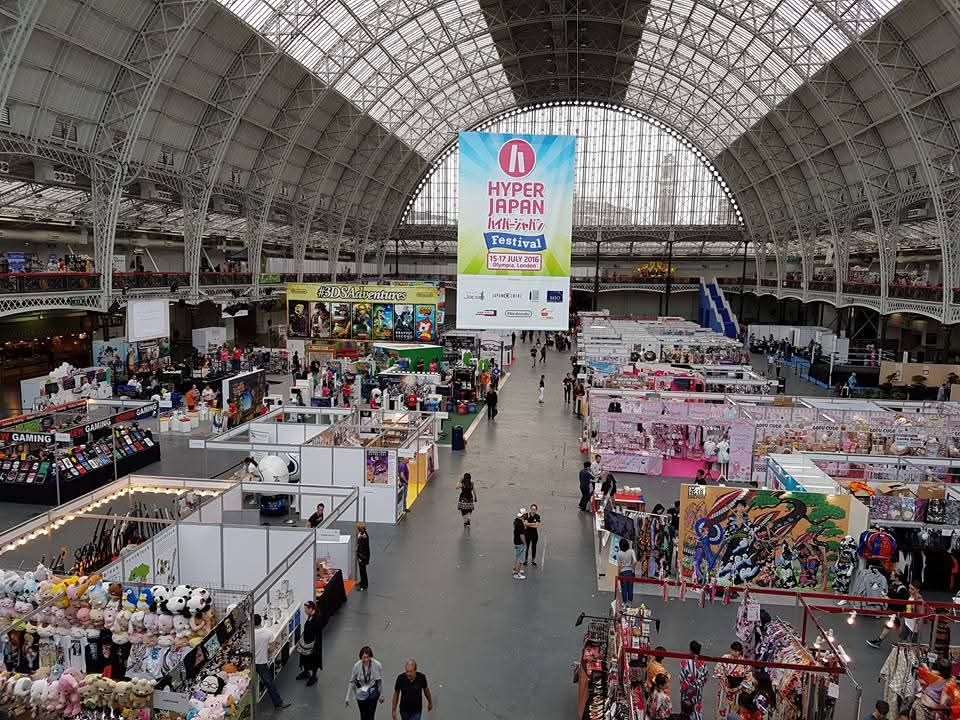
- Hyper Japan in 2016
- Status: Active
- Genre: Japanese culture
- Venue: Varies
- Location: London
- Country: United Kingdom
- Inaugurated: 2010
- Most recent: 2026
- Attendance: See below
- Organizer: Cross Media
- Website: hyperjapan.co.uk

HYPER JAPAN is the largest exhibition celebrating Japanese culture to be held in the UK. Organized by Cross Media Ltd., it was first held in London 2010, and since 2014, has taken place twice a year, in July and November. It takes place in Olympia, London.

== Overview ==
Centred on Japanese cuisine and popular culture such as gaming, manga, anime and music, the event introduces a wide range of Japanese culture, encompassing technology, fashion, traditional crafts. The venue is divided into three main areas; the stage area, the exhibition area and the experience area. The summer and winter events have different themes. The theme of the summer event is a festival of popular culture, while the winter event is a shopping and merchandising event centred around Christmas shopping.

HYPER JAPAN was developed in 2010, the brainchild of Cross Media Ltd.'s President and Representative Director Mr. Kazuhiro Marumo, as a fusion of Japanese cuisine, which is increasingly popular in the UK, and Japanese pop culture, which was already booming across Europe. In this sense, it is different from the many pop culture events that are currently held around the world by local fan communities.

=== History ===
From the first event in 2010 to the fifth event in 2013, HYPER JAPAN was staged irregularly, roughly once every nine months. Since 2014, it has been held twice a year, with a summer event in July and a Christmas event in winter. Since 2015, the summer event has taken place the week after the Japan Expo in Paris, and the Christmas event is held during the last weekend in November, which coincides with Black Friday.

=== Venues ===
As the event has grown in scale, it has moved to larger venues around London. In 2017, it took place in Tobacco Dock in the east of the city.

=== Partners ===
From the first event until the present, the Tokyo head office of the Japan Publications Trading Co., Ltd has been an official event partner, and has provided back-up for exhibitors coming from Japan. In 2014, ASOBISYSTEM, Co., Ltd., which is home to model Kyary Pamyu Pamyu, joined as an official partner, and HYPER KAWAii was staged as a sub-event as a collaboration between HYPER JAPAN and HARAJUKU KAWAii. The event is also sponsored by Japanese governmental and industry bodies such as the Embassy of Japan in London, the Japan External Trade Organization (JETRO), The Japan National Tourism Organization (JNTO), the Council of Local Authorities for International Relations (CLAIR), the Japan Foundation, the Association of Japanese Animations, the Visual Industry Promotion Organization (VIPO), the Foundation for the Promotion of Music Industry and Culture (PROMIC) and the Digital Content Association of Japan.

=== Japanese cuisine ===
A number of sub-events are organized as part of the event, all allowing visitors to vote for their favourite food and drink. The Sushi Awards aim to find the best sushi in the UK, the Sake Experience gathers together ten Japanese sake brewers with the aim of finding the UK's favourite sake and the Sake Cocktail awards determines the nation's favourite sake cocktail. The Japanese Ministry of Agriculture, Forestry and Fisheries has also participated on numerous occasions, holding cooking demonstrations, tasting corners and stage shows to drive publicity of Japanese cuisine and ingredients. Many Japanese food manufacturers also take part by taking exhibitor stands and doing cooking demonstrations.

=== Japanese popular culture ===
Many UK-based exhibitors sell a range of goods, including toys, figurines, clothing, books, magazines, fashion accessories, homeware, kitchen items, stationery and comics related to Japanese popular culture. A number of Japanese companies have exhibited as well, including Nintendo, Bandai Namco, Square Enix, Konami, Toei Animation, Kodansha Europe and Niconico. Since the first event, there has been a Cosplay show participated in by UK-based fans, and for a time, the UK heat of the World Cosplay Summit was held at the event. Many guest speakers from Japan have also appeared, including producer Mitsuhisa Ishikawa, director Naoyoshi Shiotani, writer Hirokatsu Kihara, voice actor Takashi Kondo and film director Satoshi Miki. Commenting just after his appearance, Ishikawa said, "I had thought that the UK was a conservative country, and may not appreciate the kind of edgy works we were creating, but I really feel that truly great work can transcend national boundaries. I really get the impression that Japanese culture is appreciated, so I hope that this kind of event will continue in the future."

=== Musical performances ===
There is a live stage at the venue, where acts that have performed include Yoshiki and ToshI of X Japan, Tomoyasu Hotei, Dempagumi.inc, Misaki Iwasa, May J., Jaru Jaru and Siro-A. Some performances have been live-streamed in Japan courtesy of Niconico.

=== Fashion ===
As well as a merchandise area, there is always a kawaii fashion show for fans to take part in. In the past, a fashion show has also been held as a collaboration between model Misako Aoki and shironuri artist MINORI. At HYPER JAPAN 2011, a UK Kawaii Star of the Year contest was held, which featured musician Kanon Wakeshima as a guest judge.

=== Technology ===
Japanese technology company ITK, which is best known for its handroid robotic hand, has appeared every year since 2011, either on stage or in a booth, showcasing their very latest technology. At HYPER JAPAN 2014 there was a guest appearance by Tomotaka Takahashi, who developed Kirobo, the world's first robotic astronaut, where he demonstrated his creation.

=== Traditional arts ===
In addition to sales of kimono, Japanese accessories and other traditional craft products and workshops, there are performances of martial arts, buyō (Japanese dancing), shamisen, shakuhachi, koto and taiko drum playing, tea ceremony, flower arranging and other traditional Japanese crafts. There is also an exhibition of bonsai by the Federation of British Bonsai Societies, which has previously been awarded a gold medal at the Royal Horticultural Society's Chelsea Flower Show. In 2013, there was a guest appearance by the Australian geisha Sayuki (real name: Fiona Graham) who was the first ever non-Japanese geisha. Together with other geisha from her house she provided a behind the scenes view of a geisha house, including dressing, make-up and practising.

=== Tourism and regional promotion ===
Besides governmental bodies such as the JNTO, CLAIR and the Tokyo Convention and Visitors' Bureau, UK-based travel agents specialising in trips to Japan also participate from time to time. In addition, representatives from Okinawa Prefecture, Fukuoka City, Shizuoka City, Nantan City and others have attended for reasons of regional promotion.

=== Charity ===
HYPER JAPAN 2011 was held to help reconstruction in the aftermath of the Tōhoku earthquake and tsunami, under the banner of Genki Giving. Donation money was raised via the earthquake exhibition section, charity raffle and workshops. The organizers also donated a portion of the sponsorship and ticket revenue from that event to the Tohoku Earthquake Relief Fund organized by the Japan Society.

== Events ==
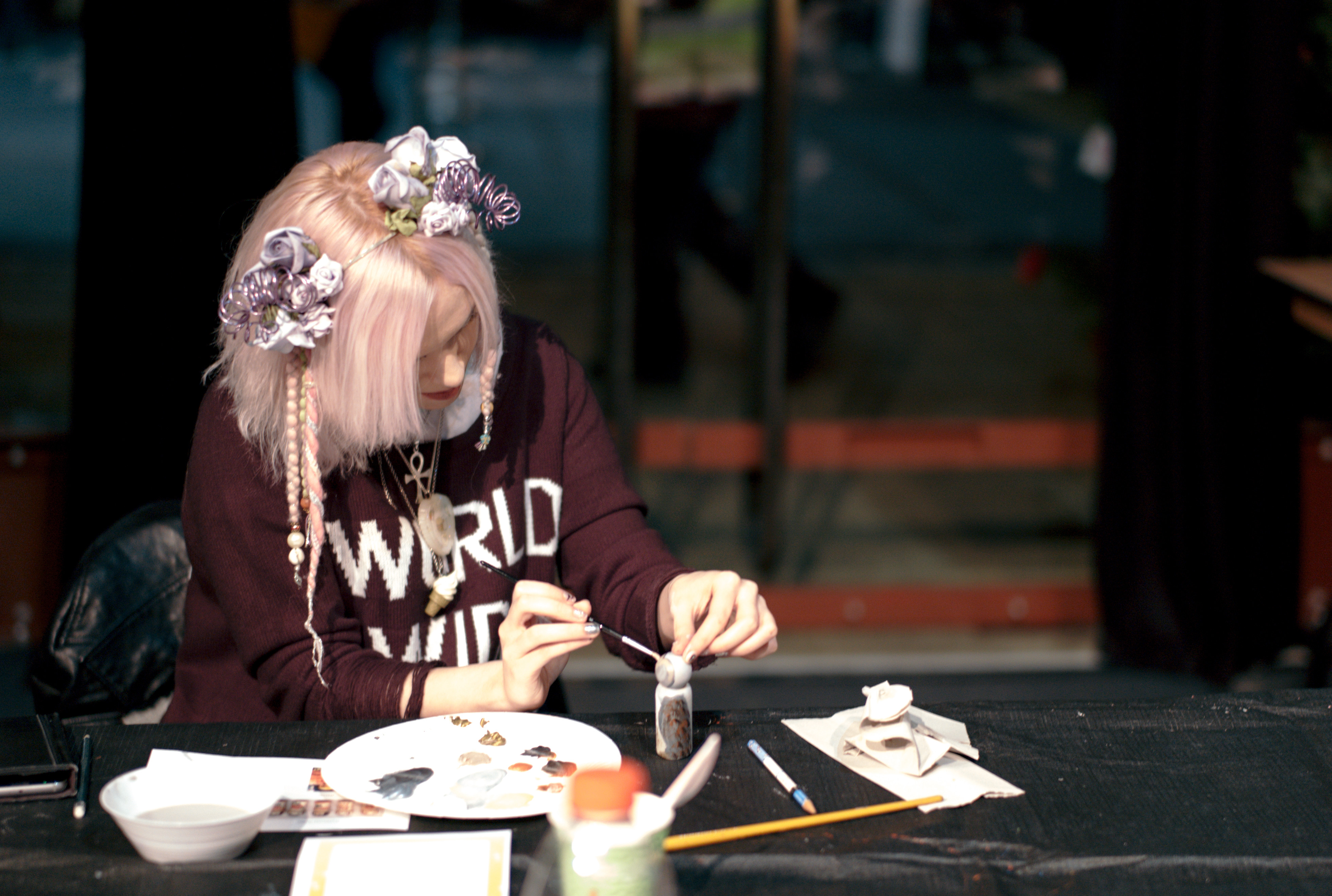
Craft Workshop at Hyper Japan

Event	Date	Venue	Attendance	Guests
HYPER JAPAN 2010	1–3 October 2010	The Old Truman Brewery	13,000	
HYPER JAPAN 2011	22–24 July 2011	Olympia Two	25,000	
HYPER JAPAN 2012 Spring	24–26 February 2012	Earl's Court	35,000	Natsuko Aso
HYPER JAPAN 2012 Christmas	23–25 November 2012	Earl's Court	46,000	
HYPER JAPAN 2013	26–28 July 2013	Earl's Court	62,000	Yun*Chi
HYPER JAPAN 2014	25–27 July 2014	Earl's Court	84,000	Yanakiku, Broken Doll, Hibiki Ichikawa, Akari Mochizuki, One Not'e, Siro-A, Mayuco, Den, Yun*Chi, Anna Yano, Ayumi Seto, Emma & Eri Tanioku, EVA, Naga Yanagi, NEEKO, Pochi, Yura, Kaede Ozawa, Himezawa
HYPER JAPAN 2014 Christmas Market	14–16 November 2014	Olympia	50,000	NeM, Hiroko Tanaka Nihon Buyo, Akari Mochizuki, Hibiki Ichikawa, SOAS Min'yo, SIRO-A, Anna Yano, Koike Miyu, Diana Garnet, Joe Inoue
HYPER JAPAN Festival 2015	10–12 July 2015	The O2	86,000	Tokyo Girl's Style, May J., Dempagumi.inc, Eir Aoi, Yoshiki, Toshi, Kobun Shizuno, Die Milch, Takamasa Sakurai, Hirokatsu Kihara
HYPER JAPAN Christmas Market 2015	27–29 November 2015	Tobacco Dock	50,000	Ladybaby, Minori, Enrique Gomez, James Hawkins, Salvatore Maggio
HYPER JAPAN Festival 2016	15–17 July 2016	Olympia	80,000	Charisma.com, Hirokatsu Kihara, Azumi Inoue, Yuyu, BANG, Yucha from Less Than Love
HYPER JAPAN Christmas Market 2016	25–27 November 2016	Tobacco Dock	50,000	The Hoopers, HIZAKI, Fuki
HYPER JAPAN Festival 2017	14–16 July 2017	Tobacco Dock	80,000	REOL, The Sixth Lie, Moso Calibration, Toriena, Fuka Mariwo, Broken Doll, Tokyo Rickshaw, KAIEN, SHINOBI-TRY, SHIN
HYPER JAPAN Christmas Market 2017	24–26 November 2017	Tobacco Dock	50,000	FEMM, MUTANT MONSTER, LOVEBITES, xiè, Kanon Suzuhara, Aimi Ikenaga, Mokapi, Shinjo-kun, Taro Fukushika, MIOU, BOO
HYPER JAPAN Festival 2018	13–15 July 2018	Olympia		Taketeru Sunamori
HYPER JAPAN Winter 2018	16–18 November	Olympia		Banzai Japan, Xmas Eileen, MUTANT MONSTER, Utaniwa Collabo, Sankei Amo, Nao Masaoka, Hibiki Ichikawa, DJ TAKAKI, Maika Kobayashi, Akari Mochizuki
HYPER JAPAN Festival 2019	12–14 July 2019	Olympia		NECRONOMIDOL, Miura Ayme, KUNI-KEN, choco, Mitsuhiro Arita, Harumi Shuhama, Naomi Suzuki, IJEN KAI
Hyper Japan Festival 2022	22–24 July 2022	Battersea Park		Double And (2&), Mikuromika, FEMM, Blank Paper, Mika Kobayashi, Nhot Bot, Miura Ayme, NECRONOMIDOL, Garuda, Katsura Sunshine, Kenichi Yamasaki, Nina Saotome, Nozomi Itagaki, Sare, L. J. English, Alfhilde, Nyaru, Japone Artists, Hibiki Ichikawa & Akari Mochizuki, Kani Kanizawa, YOSAKOI LONDON – TEMUZU, Merryweather, MION, Tokyo Soundscape, RoBKTA, Nyokeë, NILFRUITS, SAMURAI ARTIST KAMUI, Sif Avellana, Phoebe, BANG, Seirenkan Sōsuishi-ryū
Hyper Japan Festival 2023	21–23 July 2023	Olympia		FEMM, Miura Ayme, Isiliel, Kobayashi Mika, Japan Fudemoji Association, Densha, RIN-PA, Maids of England, Naomi Suzuki, LJ English, VOCAFEST UK & Ireland, YOSAKOI LONDON – TEMUZU, Samurai Artist KAMUI, R I N C H, Akari Mochizuki, DENSHONEN, Dariasirene, Ready Singer One, MION, Colorpointe
Hyper Japan Festival 2024	19–21 July 2024	Olympia	80,000	Romi Park; RAM RIDER; Who‑ya Extended; Akase Akari; SARE; Nyokee; Kaiju Project; Alessandra + DENSHONEN; Naho; Tsugaru Shamisen Players (traditional); KOTOMEN (koto); NIJISANJI EN (Vox Akuma, Elira Pendora, Kotoka Torahime)
Hyper Japan Festival 2025	18–20 July 2025	Olympia	85,000	Demian Bloom; Isiliel; London Okinawa Sanshinkai (sanshin); Ai Higuchi; marasy; Haruka Nakashima; KOTOMEN (koto); Einojo Senju; Dariasirene; TC.KYLIE × The Hourglass; Temuzu (Yosakoi); Ready Singer One; Two Gun Mathilda; SHAMISEN LONDON feat. Akari Mochizuki (shamisen); Hibiki Ichikawa & DJ TAKAKI (shamisen + DJ); Wa‑chord (taiko); Jewelia; Yuka Iguchi
Hyper Japan Manchester 2025	14–16 November 2025	Manchester Central Convention Complex	30,000	Marina Yozora; Yo‑Kai‑Wai ensemble; Yoh Kamiyama; Kaiju Project; DJ Mika; Tengu Taiko (taiko drums); Sumie (koto); Laonikos (shakuhachi); Akiharu Kitagawa (koto); Shoko Yoshida; L. J. English; Aya Hirano; #STDRUMS YUJI; Aziz Ibrahim & Sumie (guitar + koto); MIYUNA; Yukka; GB Kendo; Yusuke Yamasaki; PlayMud String Quartet
Hyper Japan Festival 2026	24–26 July 2026	Olympia		QUEEN BEE; Sacred Fleramo; British Shorinji Kempo Federation; UPIKO; TAKUYA TANIGUCHI THE TAIKOIST; Utane Chan; PlayMud Strings; Aigoro Hanayagi; Warakuren; Chiaki Kobayashi; Yuko Yokoi; The Sixth Lie; Press X; Nobu GOTO; TALE of GENJI / HOKUSAI IMMERSIVE CONCERT; Geeky Beats Big Band; KEISUKE YOSHIZAWA; Chaidura; Jikankai; Re:O; Elsie Lovelock; Eir Aoi; JERO11; avantgardey
