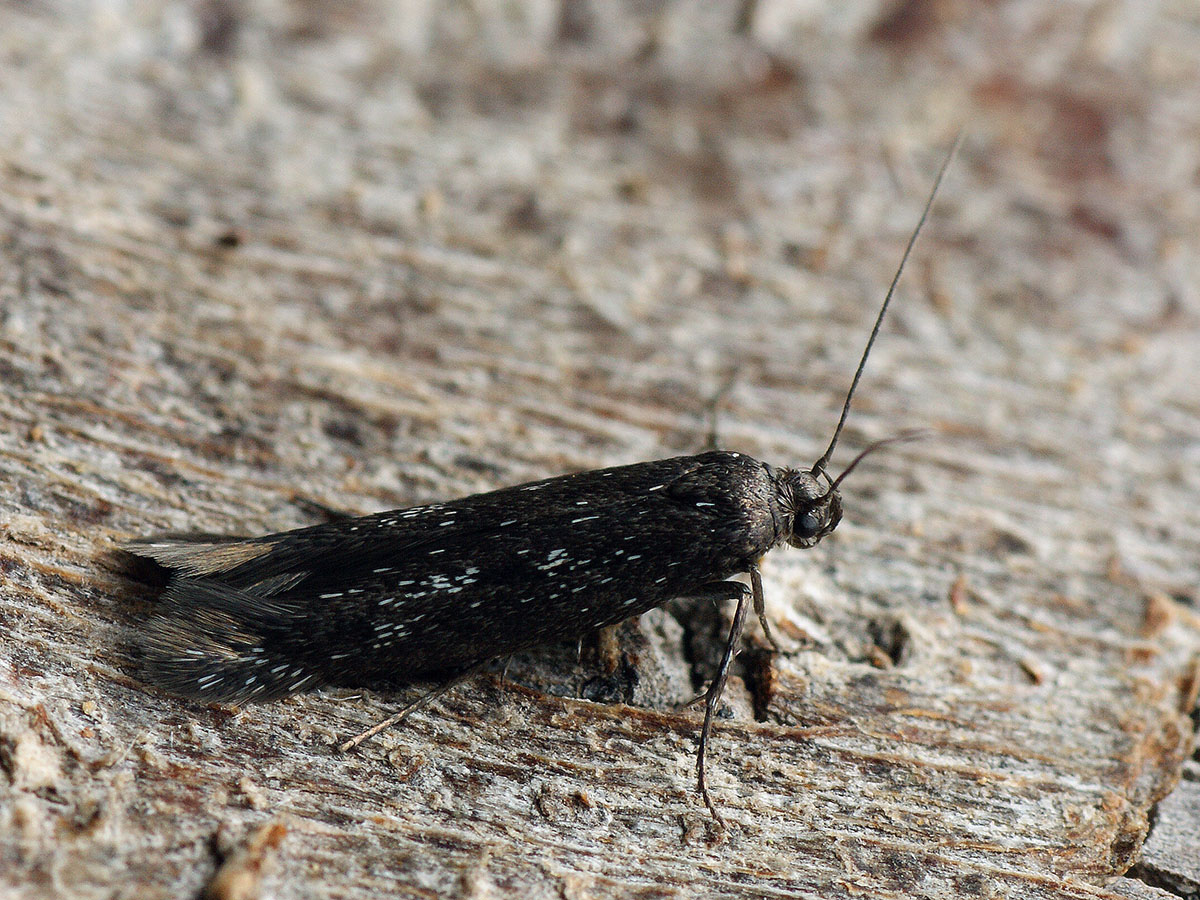

Scientific classification
- Kingdom: Animalia
- Phylum: Arthropoda
- Clade: Pancrustacea
- Class: Insecta
- Order: Lepidoptera
- Family: Scythrididae
- Genus: Scythris
- Species: S. inspersella

Binomial name
- Scythris inspersella (Hübner, 1817)

Synonyms
- List: Tinea inspersella Hübner, [1817]; Gelechia aterrimella Walker, 1864; Scythris hypotricha de Joannis, 1920; Scythris epilobiella McDunnough, 1942

= Scythris inspersella =

Species of moth

Scythris inspersella, the Norfolk owlet, is a moth of the family Scythrididae, first described by the German entomologist Jacob Hübner in 1817. It has a Holarctic distribution.

== Description ==
The wingspan is 13–15 mm. The forewings are black with blueish-white scales. The hindwings are dark ochreous brown. Adults are on wing from July to August, flying during the day, visiting flowers.

The larvae feed (usually gregariously) on rosebay willowherb (Chamerion angustifolium), broad-leaved willowherb (Epilobium montanum) and great willowherb (Epilobium hirsutum). They spin the terminal shoots of their host plant together. Larvae can be found in June and July.

== Distribution ==
The moth is found in Asia, Europe and North America. In Great Britain it was first found at Hockwold, Norfolk in 1977, although not identified until 1980. It has since been found elsewhere in Norfolk, Yorkshire (2001) and Tunstall Common, Suffolk.
