= Mary Millicent Wigg =

South Australian artist

Mary Millicent Wigg (nee Lamphee; 8 October 1904 – 29 April 2001) was an Australian oil painter, best known for her works depicting scenes from the South Australian Landscape and beyond. Active for over seven decades, she was a member of the South Australian Society of Arts and exhibited in Adelaide galleries from the 1960s onward. Wigg's work featured in the 1964 Adelaide Festival of arts, and her work continues to be collected and exhibited posthumously. Dedicated to her practice throughout her life, Wigg died aged 96 in a car accident while returning from a painting trip to the Flinders Ranges.

== Personal life ==
Mary Millicent Wigg (nee Lamphee) was born on October 8, 1904, in Kensington Park, South Australia, to Phillip and Clara (nee Dunstan) Lamphee.

Wigg attended Girton Girls School Adelaide and the Elder Conservatorium of Music. She played the viola in the Adelaide Symphony Orchestra and was strongly supported by industrial engineer and art collector, John William Calvert Murrell.

She was mentored by South Australian painter Ingrid Erns.

On June 20, 1931, she married engineer and pilot Ronald Wigg, the grandson of the founder of E. S. Wigg & Son. They had three children together; Helen, Hugh, and Phillip. She illustrated the 1992 book E.S. Wigg and his Successors, which detailed the history of the Wigg family.

Wigg died on April 29, 2001, aged 96, as a result of a car accident whilst returning from a painting trip to the Flinders Ranges.

== Artistic career ==
Wigg was an active artist from the 1930s and was painting up until her death in 2001 and is known for her Australian landscape paintings done with oils on board and masonite. She was a member of the South Australian Society of Arts from 1959 to 1970.

She exhibited at the Society of Arts Gallery Institute Building in North Terrace, Adelaide, in 1961 and 1963, and at the Walkerville Gallery in 1963 and 1967. Her work was also displayed during the Adelaide Festival of Arts Exhibition of Australian Art in 1964.

The book E.S. Wigg and his Successors features an oil painting of Wigg's on the cover depicting the original farm of Edgar Smith in the United Kingdom. Mary painted A Tidal Mill, built c. 1100 A.D., which was at Woodbridge, Suffolk on E.S. Wigg's original farm and the book contains other artworks and illustrations of hers.

== Exhibitions ==
She exhibited The Loft - Paradise on May 2, 1961 and King's Cross on 7 May 1963 held at the Society of Arts Gallery, Institute Building in North Terrace, Adelaide opened by South Australian artist, writer and author, Allan Sierp on May 7, 1963.

On September 1963 at the Walkerville Gallery, her exhibition was opened by distinguished Australian surgeon Sir Henry Newland where her oil works featured two Sydney Street scenes Kings Cross and Old houses, Pyrmont which art critics described as being drawn with assurance and clarity. Other exhibitions followed in the Adelaide Festival of Arts - exhibition of Australian art, March 6-21, 1964.

Wigg's work was shown again at the Walkerville Gallery on November 1,1965, opened by Mr E. C. Scales. Her works for this exhibition included studies from her travels overseas to places such as Africa and Hong Kong.

There was a later exhibition at the Walkerville Gallery in 1967 where reviewers described her impressions as rather tight and air-less, painstakingly accurate, and becoming almost primitive in a piece titled South Kensington. On 24 May 1972 she held another Exhibition of Paintings with Jessamy Bruce opened by gender equality activist and educator, Mrs Diana Medlin at the Miller Anderson Art Gallery in Adelaide.

In 2024, Wigg's paintings were displayed alongside many artworks from the Australian Heritage Festival and the Inaugural Perth Art Weekend.

== Collections ==
Since Wigg's death, her paintings have continued being sold at auctions and acquired by collectors.

One of Wigg's supporters and collectors was William John Calvert Murrell, who lived next door to Wigg at Frederick Street, Gilberton in Adelaide. William acquired several paintings from Wigg, including the first nude painting she had made of herself.
