= Fukagawa, Tokyo =

Fukagawa 深川
- District
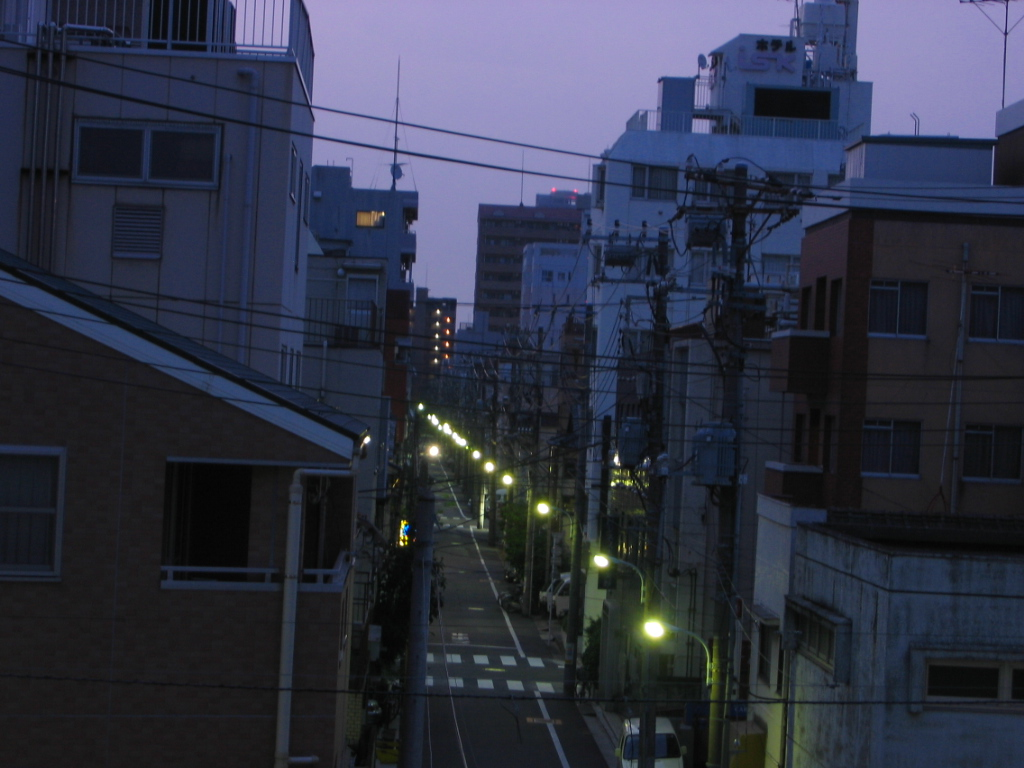
- Fukagawa in the evening

- Location in Tokyo
- Coordinates: 35°40′33″N 139°47′46″E
- Country: Japan
- Prefecture: Tokyo

Area
  - Total: 0.22 km^{2} (0.085 sq mi)

Population (August 2015)
  - Total: 3,843
- Postal Code: 135-0033

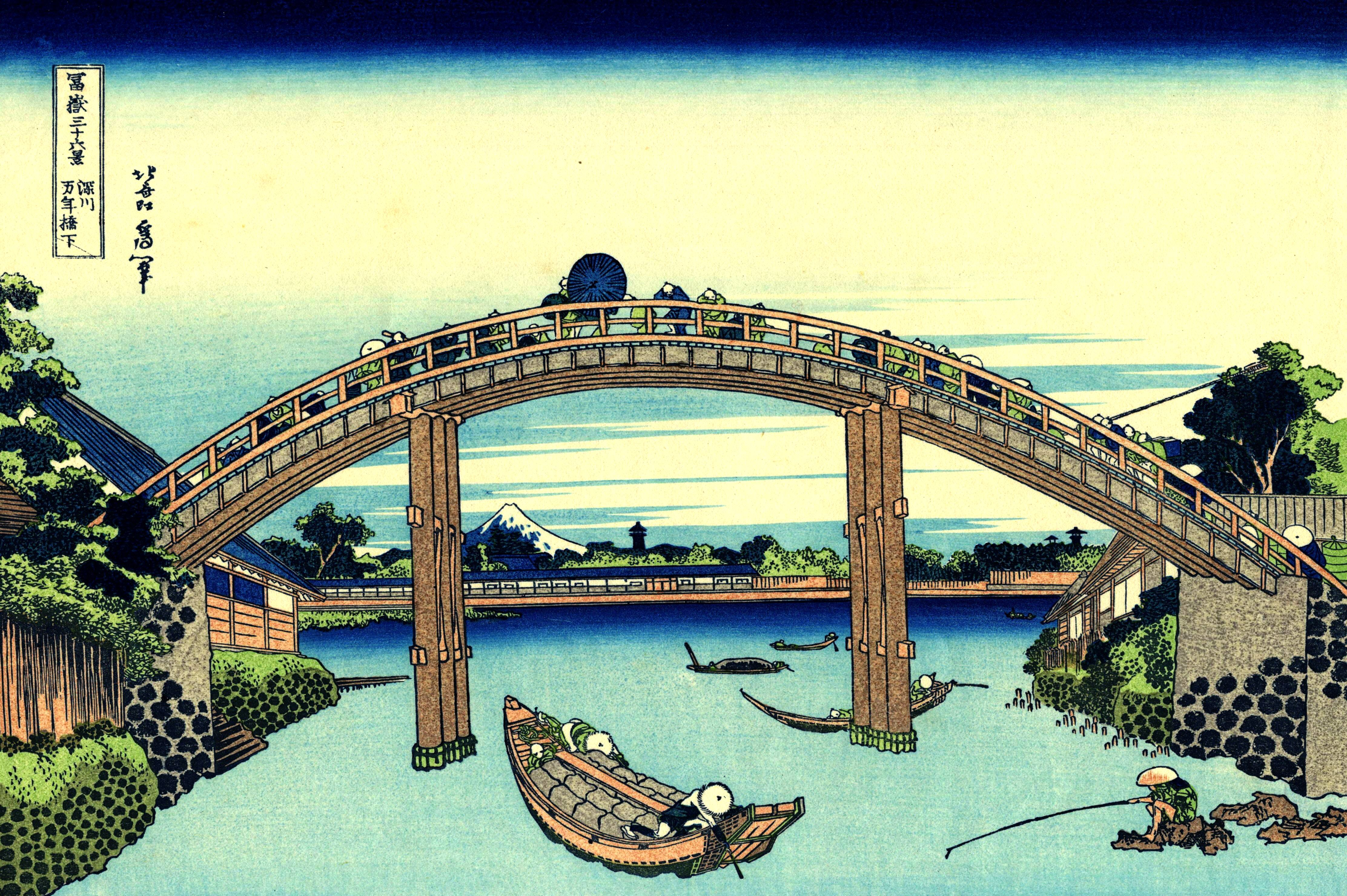
"Under Mannen Bridge at Fukagawa", part of Hokusai's Thirty-six Views of Mount Fuji.

Fukagawa (深川) is a district in Kōtō, Tokyo. It is traditionally part of the Shitamachi area of Tokyo. Formerly, it was a ward of the historical Tokyo City. In 1947, Fukagawa was incorporated into the ward of Kōtō, together with Suginami. Fukagawa has a large South Asian population, mainly consisting of Pakistanis and Bangladeshis.

== History ==
The Fukagawa neighbourhood is named after its founder, Fukagawa Hachirozaemon. Originally, parts of the Fukagawa district below the Eitai river (excluding Etchujima) had been part of the adjoining Pacific Ocean coastline; Hachirouemon developed these areas into viable land through the use of landfills.

After the loss of roughly 60 percent of the city to the Great Fire of Meireki in 1657, the local shogunate ordered Buddhist temples on the north and west banks of the Onagi River and the east bank of the Sumida River to be relocated. During this time, the area had been mainly occupied by fishermen, with a population of just over 1000; as of 1695, the area became officially known as the town of Fukagawa-Sagamachi.

Following this, Fukagawa became known for its granary trade in rice and other grains; up until World War II, it was known as one of Tokyo's largest grain markets. In later decades, the construction of bridges along the Sumida River (previously prohibited for security purposes) allowed greater external access to the area, leading to Fukagawa becoming a gateway for the neighbouring town of Monzen-machi and a local red-light district.

== Geisha ==
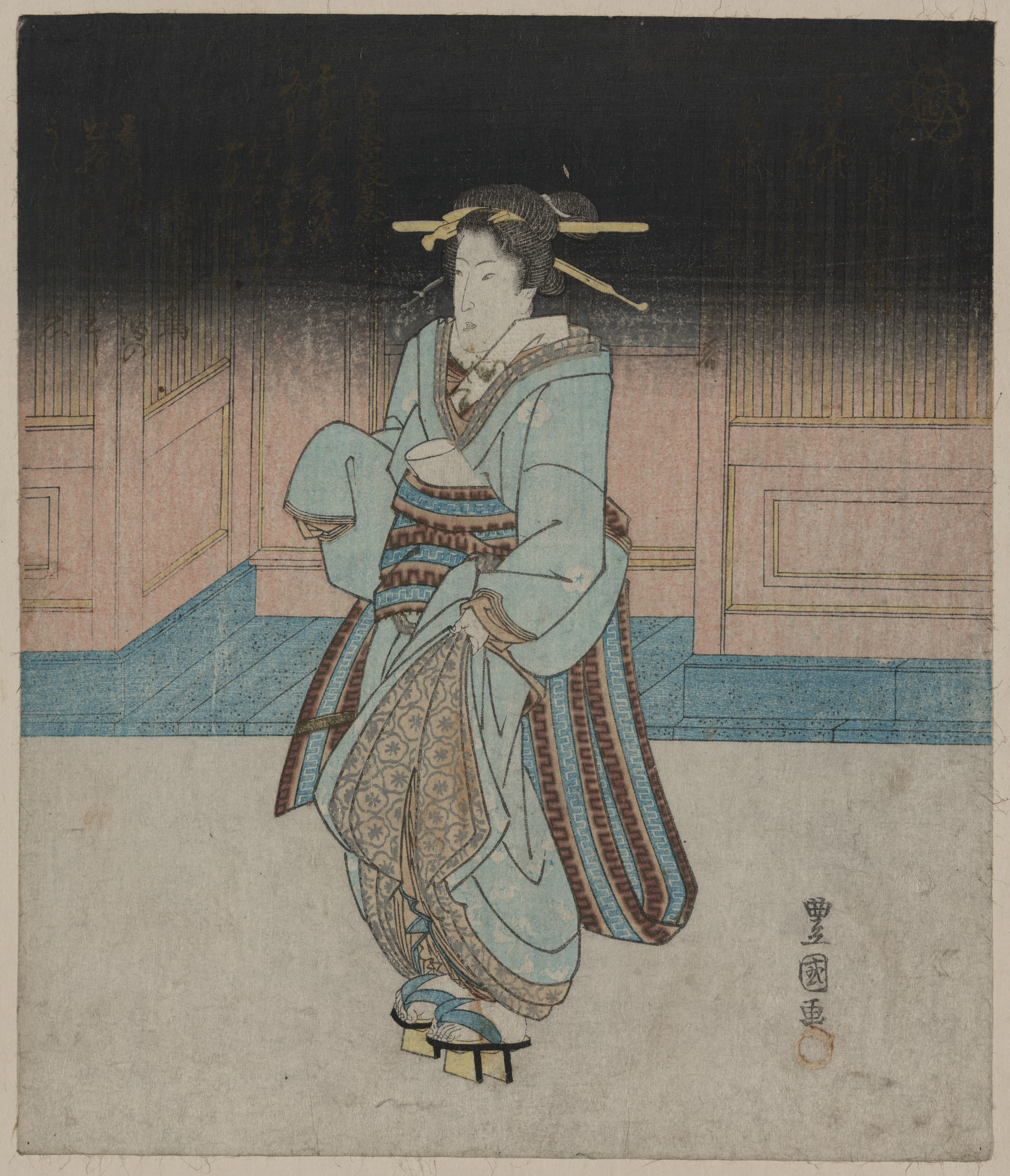
Yoru no Fukagawa Geisha, woodblock print by Utagawa Toyokuni.

Fukagawa was an area particularly known for the brash and cutting-edge styles of the geisha who worked there, known as haori geisha or tatsumi geisha, the former nickname ostensibly for having popularised the wearing of the haori – a kimono jacket – by women, when previously it had been worn solely by men. Fukagawa was the location of the first female geisha in Edo, as geisha had originally been male entertainers before transitioning to a majority-female profession in the early 19th century.

Numbers of geisha declined in the 1980s and the geisha office was temporarily closed. Fukagawa was revived in 2015 with the influx of a number of younger geisha who were still working individually in the area, including Australian national Fiona Graham and her geisha school.

== Matsuo Bashō ==
Fukagawa is known for its relations to the famous Japanese poet, Matsuo Bashō. In 1680, Bashō moved to Fukagawa. Here, he wrote one of his most famous poems, Frog Poem.

== Education ==
Koto Ward Board of Education operates public elementary and junior high schools.

Kazuya Elementary School (数矢小学校) and Meiji Elementary School (明治小学校) serve different parts of Fukagawa. Fukugawa Second Junior High School (深川第二中学校) serves the full neighborhood.
