= Edward Neale Wigg =

Edward Neale Wigg (1847 – 12 December 1927), commonly referred to as E. Neale Wigg, was a prominent Australian businessman. He operated a successful bookshop and stationers started by his father, known as ES Wigg & Son, and later was a major investor or director in many important Australian mining companies, notably BHP.

== Early life ==
Wigg was born in Warwickshire, England, son of Edgar Smith Wigg (7 June 1818 – 15 October 1899) of Tunstall, Suffolk. The family emigrated to Australia in May 1849, and Edgar founded a successful stationery and book shop at 12 Rundle Street, Adelaide.

Edward and his younger brothers Alfred and Henry studied at John Lorenzo Young's Adelaide Educational Institution.

== Bookselling interests ==
Edward joined his father’s business in 1867, when it became known as ES Wigg & Son. They bought out rival Charles Platts, becoming South Australia's largest bookseller. The Wiggs soon resold Platts' shop to John Howell, who died a few years later. ES Wigg & Son expanded its manufacturing facilities, opened another shop in Apollo Place, and added artists' supplies and educational material to its catalogue. They expanded their manufacturing facilities, opened another shop in Apollo Place, and added artists' supplies and educational material to their catalogue.

By 1885, the elder Wigg retired. William Laidlaw Davidson (1853-25 October 1924), who married his daughter Mary Jane Wigg (born 6 April 1860) on 1 September 1885, became manager. E. Neale Wigg remained head of the business. ES Wigg & Son opened branches in Broken Hill, Perth, Fremantle and Kalgoorlie. In 1904, it built a factory at 79-85 Port Road, Thebarton.

In 1910, E. Neale Wigg sold his interest in the company to the Davidson family, who retained the business name. In 1921, ES Wigg and Son moved to new premises at 65-69 Grenfell Street, on the Coromandel Place corner.

== Mining interests ==
E. Neale Wigg entered the mining business as a major investor in the Wirrialpa mine in 1887. He was elected chairman of directors of the Hale River Ruby Mine in 1888. He was a director of BHP from 1890 to 1906, and chairman of directors 1897-1899. As BHP chairman, he was responsible for hiring Guillaume Delprat, BHP's General Manager for over 20 years. He was also a director of the Lady Evelyn gold mine at Coolgardie, the Ivanhoe mine at Kalgoorlie, the Bon Accord Cape York Peninsula Syndicate, and Mount Lyell Mining & Railway Company.

== Personal ==
Wigg married Janet Davidson on 6 September 1871, just 17 days after she arrived on the ship City of Adelaide with her aunt and uncle. Their son Frank Morewood Wigg was born July 1872. He studied at Prince Alfred College and graduated MB and BCh at the University of Edinburgh in 1900, but died of pneumonia in Edinburgh a year later. His parents received the sad news as they were en route to England to see him. Apart from a few visits, they never returned to Australia, and around 1910 E. Neale Wigg changed his name to Edward Neale.

He was a strong Anglican churchman and was elected synodsman for St Matthew's Church at Kensington, South Australia every year from 1884 to 1887.

He left the bulk of his wealth to the University of Adelaide for medical research.

== Sources ==
- http://cityofadelaide.org.au/janet-davidson-wigg.html
