= Alfred Edgar Wigg =

South Australian medical practitioner (1857 – 1914)

Alfred Edgar Wigg (2 February 1857 – 1 May 1914) was a South Australian medical practitioner born in North Adelaide.

His father, Edgar Smith Wigg (7 June 1818 – 15 October 1899) of Tunstall, Suffolk came to South Australia in May 1810, and founded the successful E. S. Wigg and Son bookshop in Rundle Street.

He was a prize-winning pupil at J. L. Young's Adelaide Educational Institution and studied medicine at the University of Adelaide and University College London and in Europe, returning to Australia in 1882. with qualifications M.R.C.S., L.R.C.S. and M.D. (Brux).

He lived for some time on Sydenham Road and practised in Norwood until 1913, when he retired.

He was an honorary member of the staff of Adelaide Children's Hospital for over 30 years; for much of the time a board member and its senior surgeon. He was chairman of the Dental Board in 1903.

He was founding chairman, and at one stage president, of the East Torrens Bowling Club.

== Family ==
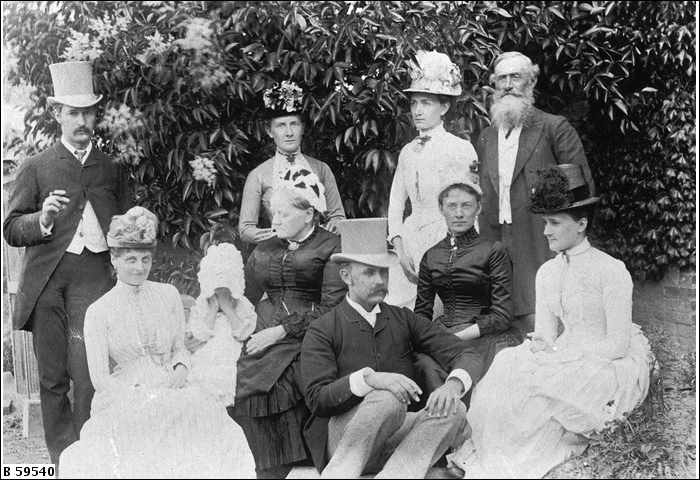
1887 Wigg family at 'Wockwalla', their summer residence at Bridgewater. Standing (from left): William Davidson, Nellie Wigg, Annie Wigg, E.S.Wigg. Seated (from left): Edith Wigg (née Parham), (probably) Olive Wigg, Mrs E.S.Wigg (née Jane Eccles), Alfred Wigg, Mary Wigg, and Florence Wigg

He married Edith Caroline Parnham 24 June 1884. They had three daughters:

(Winifred) Olive Wigg (23 Jun 1885 – 1964) married J(ohn) Stanley Murray on 8 June 1910
Doris Edith Wigg (21 Dec 1888 – 29 September 1891)
Phyllis Miriam Wigg, born on 6 September 1892, married Collier Robert Cudmore on 27 April 1922

He died of heart failure at Harrington Gardens, South Kensington in London, where he was attempting a rest cure, with his wife and daughter, Phyllis. His other daughter, Mrs. J. Stanley Murray also survived him.

He was survived by brothers E. Neale Wigg, who was living in London at the time, and Dr. Henry Higham Wigg, and sisters Mrs. W. L. Davidson (née Mary Jane Wigg), Ellen Deborah Wigg (born 9 January 1863) and Florence Fanny Wigg (born 29 May 1864).
