= Edgar Smith Wigg =

Australian bookseller & stationer (1818-1899)

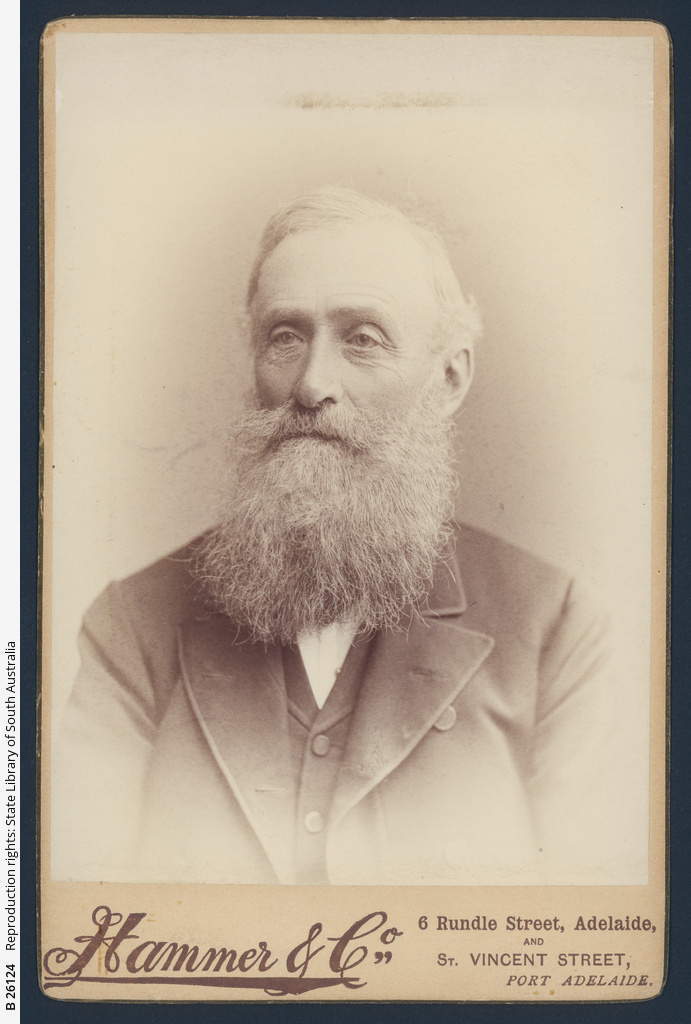

Edgar Smith Wigg (7 June 1818 – 14 September 1899) was a South Australian bookseller and stationer, founder of the Adelaide firm E. S. Wigg & Son. It still operates under that name as of December 2020, with branches across Australia.

== Early life ==
A son of Richard Wigg (c. 1790–1856), of Tunstall, Suffolk, Edgard Smith Wigg commenced work as a bank clerk, at which time he developed a book club for the benefit of his fellow workers. Sensing an opportunity, he opened a bookshop in Warwickshire. He married Fanny Neale Morewood of Atherstone, Warwickshire in September 1846. Their first child, Edward Neale Wigg, was born in 1847 and the family emigrated to the colony of South Australia shortly afterwards leaving on the William Hyde on 29 January 1849 and arriving in Port Adelaide in May 1849.

== E. S. Wigg & Son ==
Wigg rented a shop at 4 Rundle Street on 22 June 1849, where he started a business selling books and homeopathic medicine. Over time, he started manufacturing account books and educational materials.

In August 1857 the business moved to larger premises at 12 (later renumbered to 14) Rundle Street. In 1867 (or 1874?) Wigg bought another bookseller's business (Charles Platt) and became the largest bookseller in the colony, within a few years expanding the printing and manufacturing side of the business.

Wigg also opened a pharmacy at 34 King William Street.

In 1871 Edgar's son, Edward, married Janet Davidson, and a couple of years later, William Laidlaw Davidson emigrated to Adelaide and joined the company. In 1874(?) the company opened an office in London. An additional premises, a warehouse, was opened at Apollo Place in the city.

In 1885, Wigg’s daughter Mary married William Davidson, who by this time was managing the running of the business. The company opened branches in Western Australia during this period, and, after E. S. Wigg died in 1899, business expanded further. In 1902 a factory was built on Port Road at Southwark (now Thebarton and still in existence in 2016).

=== After Wigg's death ===
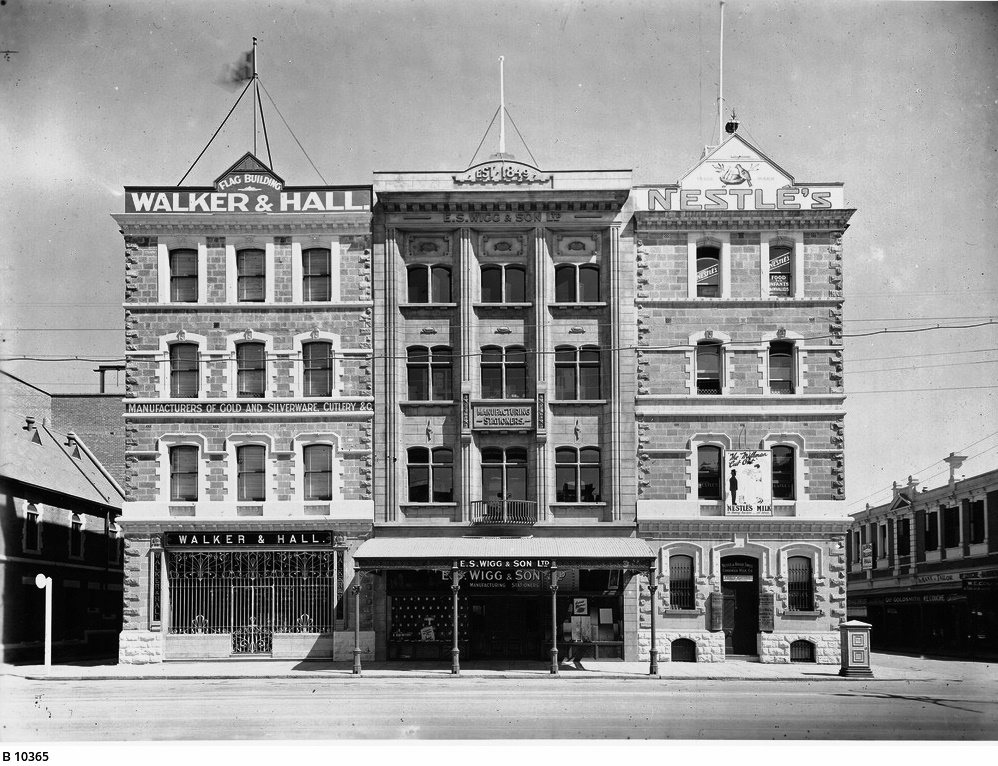
E. S. Wigg & Son stationers and adjoining buildings in Grenfell St, Adelaide, 1922

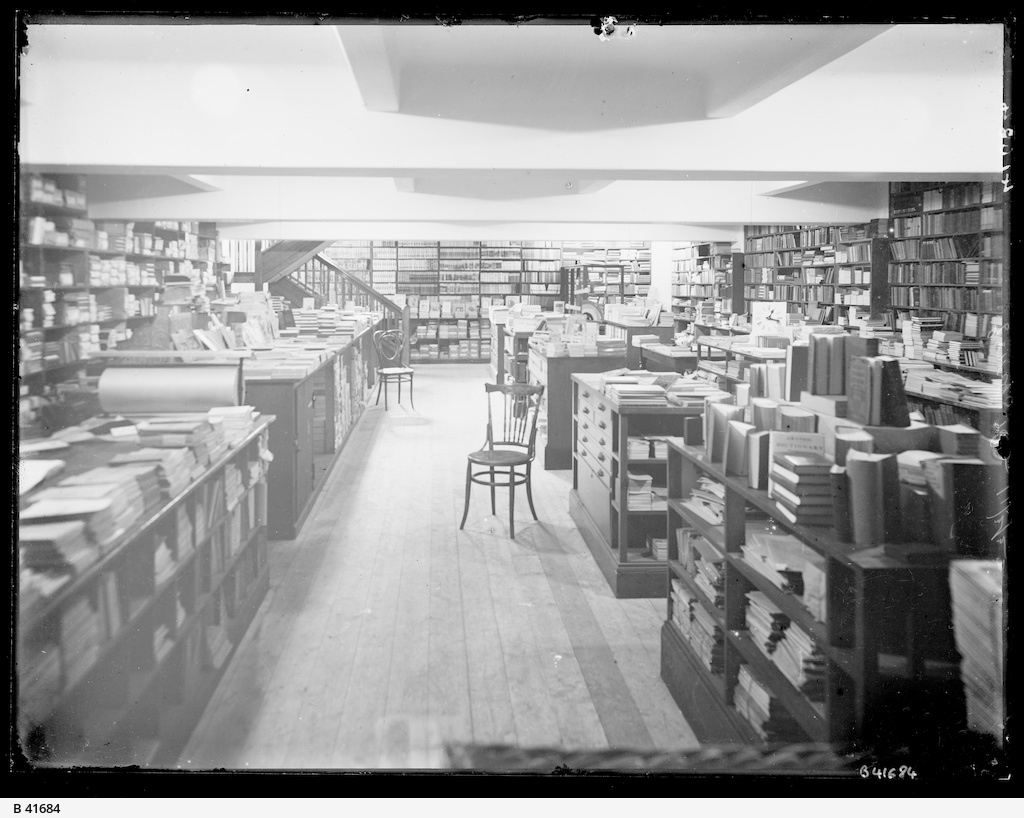
Interior of E.S. Wigg, stationery shop on Grenfell Street, Adelaide.

The company continued to grow, with the head office moving to 65 Grenfell Street in 1921, which housed the retail business until into the 21st century, and was heritage-listed on 1 November 2001. It is now known as Wiggs Building The company continued in the hands of the Davidson family until at least 2014, and is still registered as ES Wigg & Son Pty Ltd. The holding company owns a number of other businesses across the country, some registered as Wigg & Son, some as Wigg Packaging, and some with other names.

== Other activities ==
Wigg served on Adelaide City Council from 1871 to 1874 and from 1876 to 1880, then retired from business, handing it over to his eldest son E. Neale Wigg and his son-in-law W. L. Davidson.

He maintained a close relationship with the North Adelaide Baptist Church and the Institution for the Blind.

He died in 1899, aged 81.

== Siblings of E. S. Wigg ==
Two brothers of E. S. Wigg migrated to Australia in the 1850s, as did a widowed sister, who arrived on the maiden voyage of the Clipper Torrens in 1876 and lived in North Adelaide.

- R(ichard) Horace Wigg (c. 1822 – 25 September 1888) arrived in South Australia with his wife Elizabeth "Bessie" (c. 1824 – 26 May 1890) and son on the barque Lady Bruce in October 1853 and established a wholesale grocer's and wine and spirit store on King William Street, became "R. H. Wigg & Sons" in 1876. Their children included:

- Frederick Horace Wigg (1 February 1853 – 7 October 1924), J.P., married Julia Marianne Barber ( – April 1930) in 1876,
- Margaret Amelia Wigg (1854 – 2 August 1859)
- J(ohn) Richard Wigg (1856 – 26 April 1921) married Emily Margarette Frederica Barber on 4 December 1879. The Barber sisters were nieces, and wards, of J. W. Smith, American Consul in South Australia.
- Elizabeth Jane Wigg (1858–)
- Robert Wolton Wigg (1859 – 1 July 1943) married Ada Clarice Cutten in September 1882, lived in Victoria
- Edward Turner Wigg (1861 – 15 February 1885)
- Horace William Wigg (22 June 1865 – 5 January 1875) died after a fall at Waterfall Gully
They had a home "Woltonhurst", on the corner of Beulah Road and Kensington Terrace, Norwood.

- Wolton Wigg (28 October 1826 – 7 November 1915) married Sarah Thurlow (1835 - 9 May 1906) in 1866 and was a brewer in Rushworth, Victoria.

- Edgar Wigg (1867 - 10 July 1919)

- Mary Spencer, née Wigg (c. 1816 – 29 December 1882) was a sister.

== Children of E. S. Wigg ==
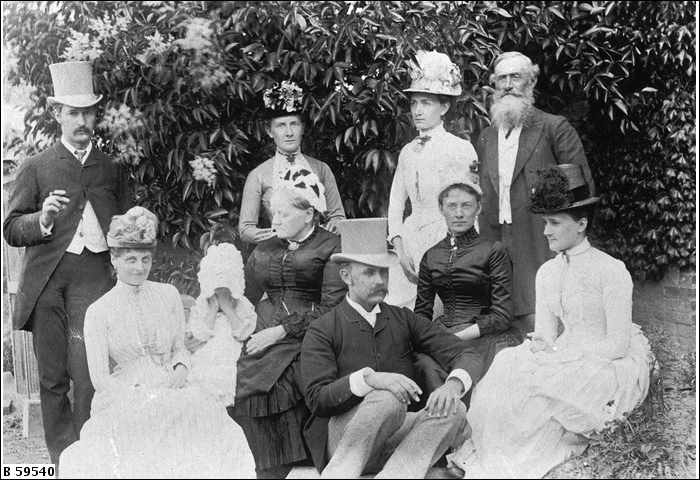
1887 Wigg family at 'Wockwalla', their summer residence at Bridgewater. Standing (from left): William Davidson, Nellie Wigg, Annie Wigg, E.S.Wigg. Seated (from left): Edith Wigg (née Parham), (probably) Olive Wigg, Mrs E.S.Wigg (née Jane Eccles), Alfred Wigg, Mary Wigg, and Florence Wigg

With Fanny Neale Wigg (née Morewood) (c. 1823 – 1 April 1853):

- Edward Neale Wigg (1847 – 12 December 1927) bookseller and chairman of directors BHP 1890-1913 Edward Neale Wigg married Janet N. Davidson on 6 September 1871.

- Frank Morewood Wigg M.B., Ch.M. (Edinburgh)(c. 1873 – 23 January 1901) died of pneumonia in Edinburgh aged 28

- Jessie Ann (22 April 1852 – 17 May 1853)

In November 1853 he married Alice (sometimes called Ann) Lane (c. 1819 – 13 January 1855) who came from Boscombe, Devon. They had no children. In November 1855 he married Jane Eccles ( – 22 July 1895); they had two boys and four girls:

- Alfred Edgar Wigg (2 February 1857 – 1 May 1914), a prominent medical practitioner, married Edith Caroline Parnham on 24 June 1884.

- (Winifred) Olive Wigg (1885–1964) married John Stanley Murray (1884–1971) on 8 June 1910

- Henry Higham Wigg (18 July 1858 – 22 April 1950) also a medical practitioner, married Lillie Margaret Melrose (25 Mar 1870 – 10 March 1932), a daughter of George Melrose, on 29 April 1891. He was Health Officer for Unley Council and was one of four patrons, with brothers-in law W. L. Davidson and F. A. Joyner, and miner Charles Henry de Rose, who sponsored the 20-year-old Hans Heysen's studies in Europe. Henry and Lillie had at least three children, Jean Melrose Wigg, Ronald Melrose Wigg and Neil Melrose Thorburn Wigg. Ronald Wigg married artist Mary Millicent Wigg (nee Lamphee 1901-2004) on 20 June 1931 and they had three children, Helen, Hugh and Philip. She illustrated the book E.S. Wigg and his Successors. The most famous was an oil painting of the original farm of Edgar Smith in the United Kingdom.
- Mary Jane Wigg (6 April 1860 – ) married William Laidlaw Davidson (1853-1924) on 1 September 1885. Davidson's sister Janet had previously married Edward Neale Wigg.
- Ellen Deborah Wigg (9 January 1863 – 9 March 1954).
- Florence Fanny Wigg (29 May 1864 – February 1940).
- Annie Adelaide Wigg (28 January 1867 – 14 August 1949) married Frederick Allen Joyner (c. 1864 – 15 December 1945) on 28 September 1889.

Their home for many years was at Lefevre Terrace Medindie. He bought the land in 1851 and had a cottage built there.

== Bibliography ==
The book E.S. Wigg and his successors (1992) is the history of the Wigg family. It contains 24 leaves of plates, many coloured. Several of these plates are works by the artist Mary Millicent Wigg (1904-2001), who married Ronald Melrose Wigg in 1931.
