= Fiona M. Doyle =

American materials scientist

Fiona Mary Doyle
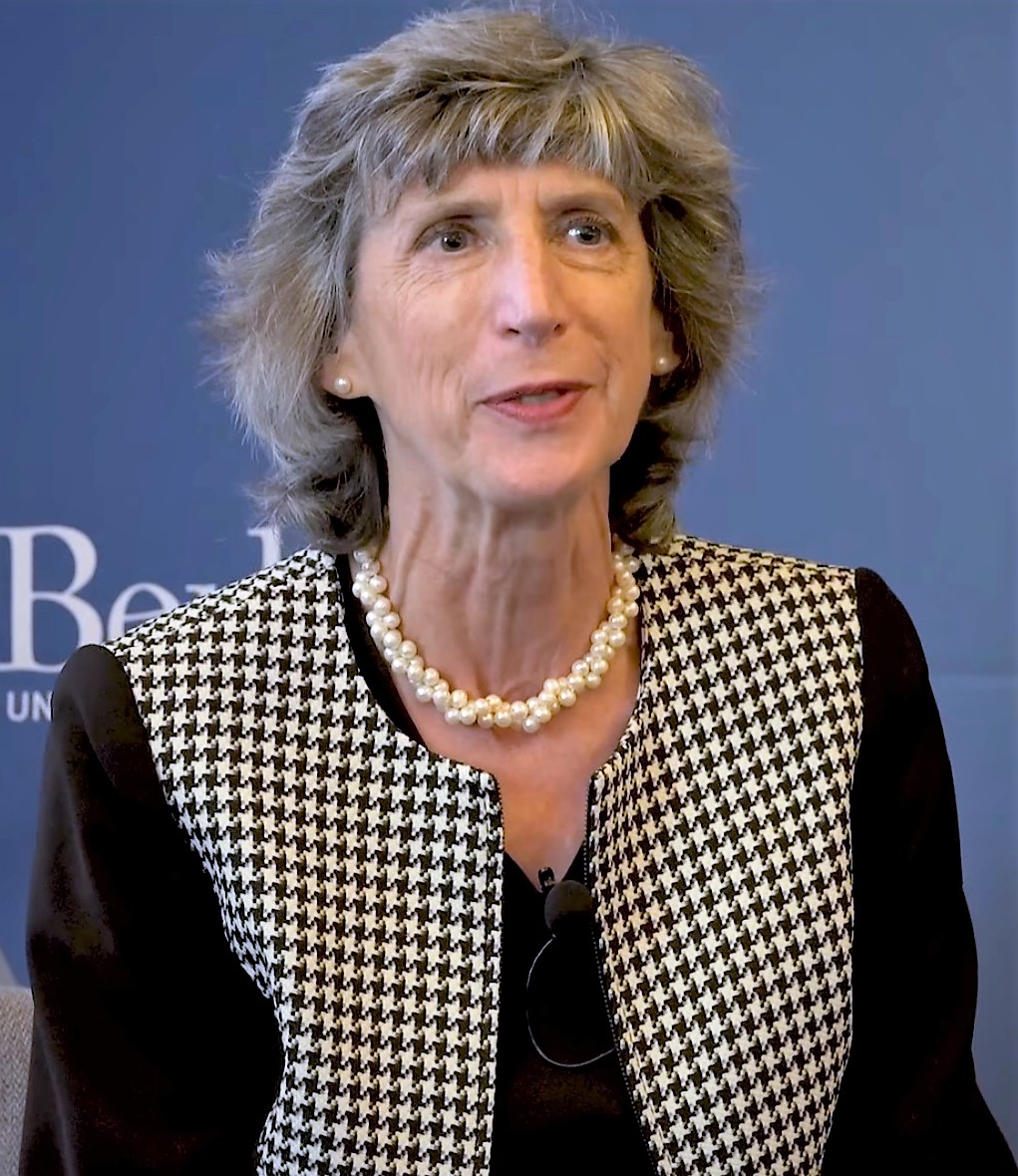
- Doyle speaks at the University of California, Berkeley in 2018
- Born: 1956 (age 69–70)
- Education: University of Cambridge; Imperial College London
- Awards: National Academy of Engineering (NAE)
- Scientific career
- Workplaces: University of California, Berkeley
- Thesis: Hydrolytic stripping of mixed metal carboxylates (1983)

Fiona Mary Doyle is an American materials scientist who is Professor of Materials Science and Engineering and the Donald H. McLaughlin Professor Emeritus at University of California, Berkeley. She was elected a member of the National Academy of Engineering in 2016 and a Fellow of The Minerals, Metals & Materials Society in 2021.

== Early life and education ==
Doyle was born in Newcastle upon Tyne, in 1956. She was an undergraduate student at the University of Cambridge, where she studied metallurgy and materials science. Doyle was a graduate student at Imperial College London, where she investigated hydrolytic stripping of mixed metal carboxylates. In her graduate engineering programme, she was the first and only woman, for nineteen years.

== Research and career ==
Doyle joined the faculty at the University of California, Berkeley in 1983. She was the first woman to join the Department of Materials Science and Engineering, and remained the only woman for twenty years. She was promoted to Professor in 1994.

Doyle's research considered the separation of metals from their ores through environmentally benign solution-based approaches. She was also interested in ways to mitigate environmental contamination and sustainable strategies to produce and recycle engineering materials. She was the guest editor for the special issue of Metals 'recycling and recovery of rare earth metals'.

Doyle served as Chair of the Academic Senate. From 2005 Doyle served as Dean of the Berkeley graduate division, where she looked to improve diversity within the graduate student population. She developed child care programs, mentoring opportunities and career workshops. She was also responsible for the creation of Engineering Student Services, which improved the experience of undergraduate researchers. Over the duration of her time as Dean, Doyle increased the funding available as graduate student fellowships by $10 million. Doyle was honoured by The Minerals, Metals & Materials Society for her services to materials science and student development. She was elected to the National Academy of Engineering section on Earth Resources in 2016. Upon her retirement in 2019, Doyle was appointed the Donald H. McLaughlin Professor Emeritus at University of California, Berkeley. In 2021 she was elected Fellow of The Minerals, Metals & Materials Society.

== Selected publications ==
- H Liu; TA Bruton; W Li, JV Buren; C Prasse; FM Doyle; DL Sedlak(January 2016). "Oxidation of benzene by persulfate in the presence of Fe (III)-and Mn (IV)-containing oxides: stoichiometric efficiency and transformation product" Environmental science & technology. 50 (2): 890-898. doi.org/10.1021/acs.est.5b04815
- Feng Xie; Ting An Zhang; David Dreisinger; Fiona Doyle (February 2014). "A critical review on solvent extraction of rare earths from aqueous solutions". Minerals Engineering. 56: 10–28. doi:10.1016/j.mineng.2013.10.021. ISSN 0892-6875. Wikidata Q59592195.
- Anh Le-Tuan Pham; Changha Lee; Fiona M Doyle; David L Sedlak (1 December 2009). "A silica-supported iron oxide catalyst capable of activating hydrogen peroxide at neutral pH values". Environmental Science & Technology. 43 (23): 8930–8935. doi:10.1021/es902296k. ISSN 0013-936X. PMC 2792909. PMID 19943668. Wikidata Q37473896.
- Haizhou Liu; Thomas A Bruton; Fiona M Doyle; David L Sedlak (18 August 2014). "In situ chemical oxidation of contaminated groundwater by persulfate: decomposition by Fe(III)- and Mn(IV)-containing oxides and aquifer materials". Environmental Science & Technology. 48 (17): 10330–10336. doi:10.1021/es502056d. ISSN 0013-936X. PMC 4151705. PMID 25133603. Wikidata Q34119821.
