= Sayuki =

Sayuki is a feminine Japanese given name. Notable people with the name include:

- Fiona Graham (1961–2023), an Australian anthropologist and professional geisha named Sayuki
- Sayuki Takagi (born 1997), a Japanese pop singer

== Fictional characters ==
- Sayuki Ayase, a character in the Your Diary visual novel
- Sayuki Katagiri, a character in the light novel and anime series Lovely Idol
- Sayuki Kuroda, a character in the visual novel Girls Beyond the Wasteland
- Sayuki Manaka, a character in the media series Duel Masters
- Sayuki Sakurai, a character in the manga series Chocolate Cosmos
- Sayuki Shirakawa, a character in the visual novel series A Kiss for the Petals
- Sayuki Takigawa, a character in the 22/7 anime TV series
- Sayuki Tezuka, a character in the game and anime series Night Shift Nurses
- Sayuki Tokihara, a character in the light novel series Hensuki

== See also ==
- Heavenly Guardian, a 2007 video game known as Legend of Sayuki in Europe
