= Tunstall Common =

Protected area in Tunstall, Suffolk

Coordinates: 52.141°N 1.474°E

- Site of Special Scientific Interest
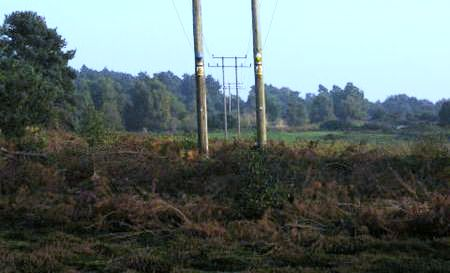
- Location of Tunstall Common.
- Area of search: Suffolk
- Grid reference: TM 378 549
- Interest: Biological
- Area: 36.6 hectares (90 acres)
- Notification date: 1984
- Location map: Magic Map

Tunstall Common is a 36.6 hectares (90 acres) biological Site of Special Scientific Interest east of Tunstall in Suffolk. It is part of the Sandlings Special Protection Area under the European Union Directive on the Conservation of Wild Birds, and the Suffolk Coast and Heaths Area of Outstanding Natural Beauty.

Most of this dry lowland heath is dominated by heather, with diverse lichens and mosses. There are also areas of acid grassland, which are being invaded by gorse and bracken. Pine scrub is encroaching from neighbouring plantations.

There is access from Orford Road and footpaths, which run through the common.
