= Fiona Graham =

Australian anthropologist, geisha

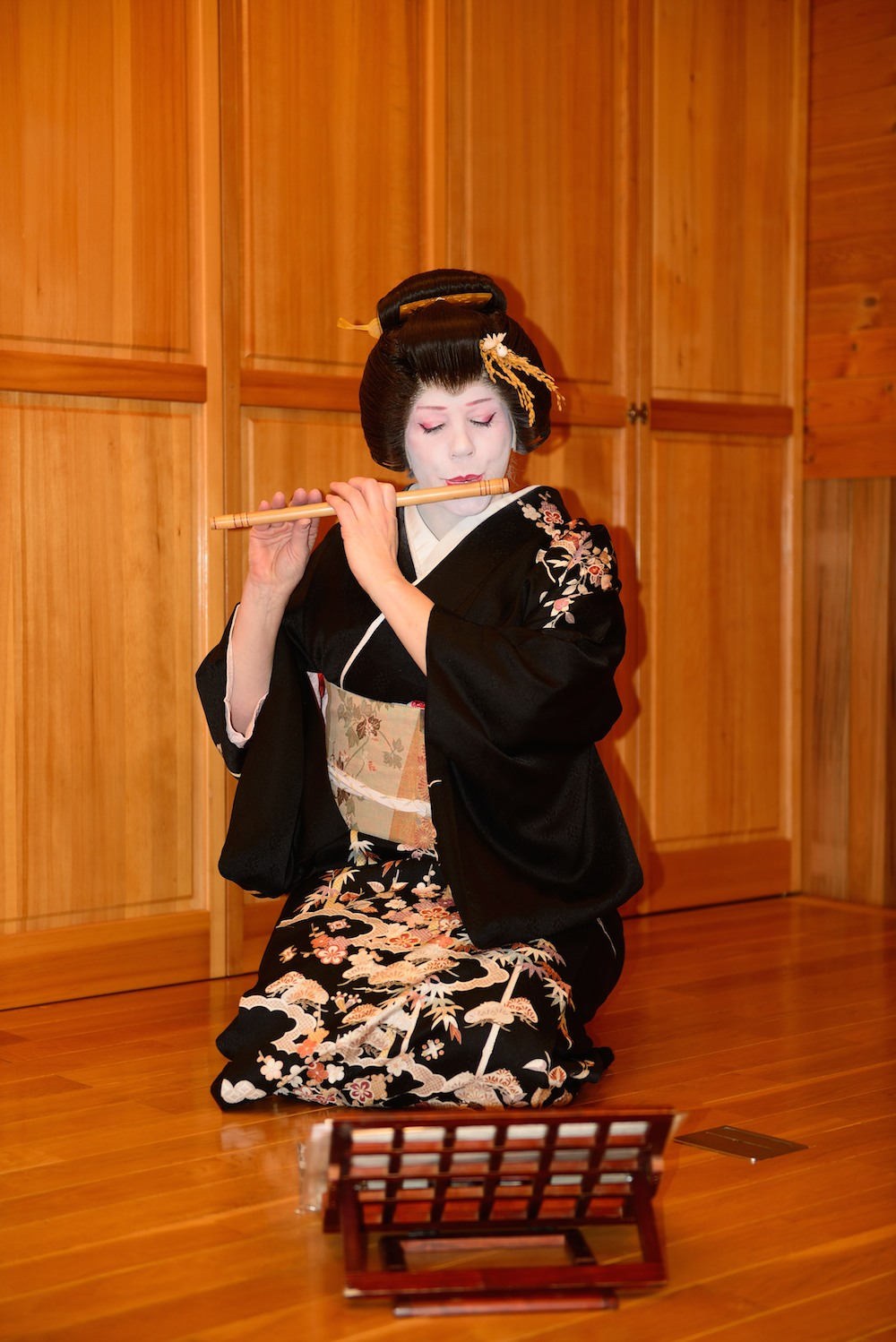
- Graham as Sayuki playing the yokobue Japanese flute in January 2013
- Born: Fiona Caroline Graham; 16 September 1961; Melbourne, Australia
- Died: 26 January 2023 (aged 61)
- Other name: Sayuki
- Education: Keio University; University of Oxford (M.Phil., D.Phil.)
- Occupations: Anthropologist, geisha
- Website: www.sayuki.net (archived 2022 version)

Fiona Caroline Graham (16 September 1961 – 26 January 2023) was an Australian anthropologist working as a geisha in Japan. She made her debut as a geisha (trainee) in 2007 in the Asakusa district of Tokyo under the name Sayuki (紗幸) as a part of her anthropological study, and as of 2021 was working in the Fukagawa district of Tokyo.

== Early life ==
Graham was born in Melbourne, Australia, and first travelled to Japan aged 15 for a student exchange programme, where she attended high school and lived with her host family. She had two siblings.

== Academic career ==
Graham's first degrees, in psychology and teaching, were taken at Keio University. She completed an M.Phil. in 1992 and a D.Phil. 2001 in social anthropology at the University of Oxford, focusing on Japanese corporate culture. She has been a lecturer on geisha studies at Keio and Waseda Universities.

Graham has published three volumes of anthropology.

Inside the Japanese Company (2003) and A Japanese Company in Crisis (2005) are about the large insurance company (given the fictional name "C-Life") that Graham joined upon graduation, and which she later observed, first as a researcher and later as a documentary film maker. The book's main subject is "the uneven erosion of the commitment of [the company's] salary men to an overarching corporate ideology", with Graham concentrating on the cohort who entered the company when she did. The reviewer of both books for the British Journal of Industrial Relations viewed her portrayal favourably, but thought that it "[did] not adequately address wider issues of structure and power relations".

The reviewer for the journal Organization of Inside the Japanese Company was troubled by the uninformativeness about Graham's interviewees and by serious problems with the book's quantitative survey. Nevertheless, he found the book insightful and rewarding.

"C-Life" eventually went under in October 2000, (Note: The large Japanese insurance company Chiyoda Seimei Hoken also collapsed in October 2000.) and A Japanese Company in Crisis concentrated on the ways in which individual employees thought and acted in expectation of the hard times ahead. The reviewer again found flaws with the book, but on balance gave it a highly favourable review. The review of the book in Social Science Japan Journal had similar high praise for it.

In Playing at Politics: An Ethnography of the Oxford Union (2005), Graham built on a 2001 documentary (The Oxford Union: Campus of Tradition) that she had made for Japanese television about candidacy for president of the Oxford Union:

Graham focuses on the highly ambitious individuals who decide that their future careers will benefit more from being known as former Presidents of the Oxford Union than from the quality of their degrees. . . . The carping comments from those on the sidelines, who view the candidates as slimy self-degraders desperate for status, provide an amusing counterpoint to the seriousness of the contestants.

The reviewer for the Journal of the Royal Anthropological Institute found the book a "witty examination of British political processes" and "[recommended it] to all would-be politicians and their tutors".

== Geisha activities ==
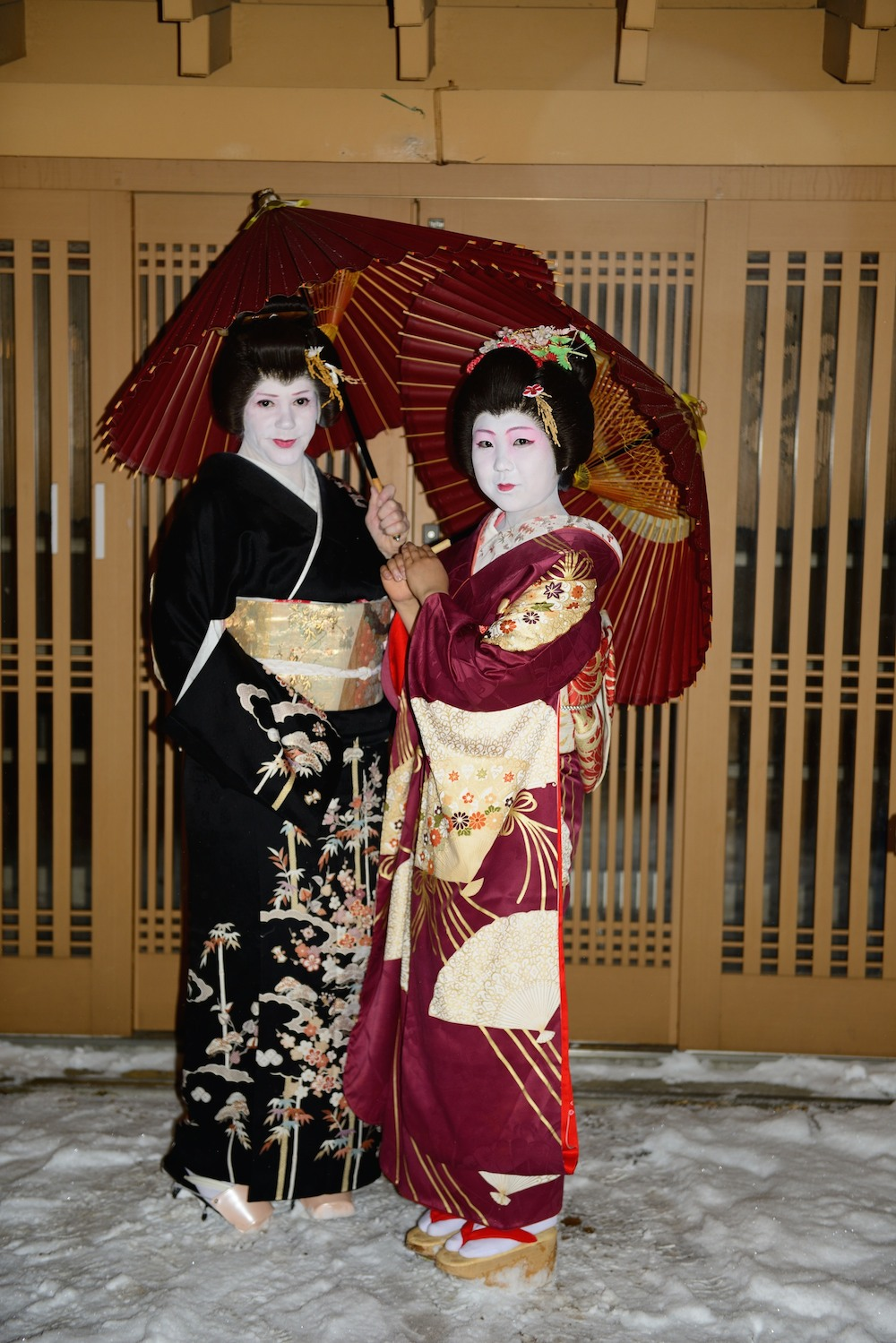
Sayuki (left) and one of her trainees in January 2013

Graham initially entered the geisha profession with the intention of directing a documentary project for the National Geographic Channel; however, upon completing her training (undertaken as part of the documentary's filming), she was given permission to continue working full-time as a geisha, and formally debuted under the name of "Sayuki" in December 2007, though the Asakusa Geisha Association claims that she did not complete required training.

Graham debuted in the Asakusa geisha district of Tokyo, and her training before this lasted for a year; this included lessons on dance, tea ceremony and the shamisen. Graham specialised in yokobue (the Japanese side-blown flute). As of 2013, the documentary itself remained unfinished.

After working in Asakusa for four years as a geisha, Graham applied for permission to take over the okiya run by her geisha mother, who was retiring due to ill health; her request was denied on the grounds of her being a foreigner.

In 2011, after being asked to leave the geisha community of Asakusa, Graham left to operate independently (against the Asakusa Geisha Association's regulations), though she continued to work as a geisha within the area, opening a kimono shop in Asakusa in the same year. In 2013, Graham was running an independent okiya in Yanaka, Tokyo, with four apprentices. By 2021, Graham had permanent residency in Japan and was running an okiya in the Fukagawa district of Tokyo with three apprentices. Graham allowed tourists to come and watch the young geisha have their lessons.

Graham travelled internationally to demonstrate the traditional arts employed by geisha, visiting the United Kingdom to perform at the Hyper Japan festival in 2013, Dubai in the same year, and Brazil in 2015.

When the COVID-19 pandemic hit Japan in 2020, Graham added online geisha banquets to the okiya's repertoire of events.

Graham died in January 2023.

== Wanaka Gym court case ==
In December 2010, Graham, the sole owner of The Wanaka Gym Ltd., a New Zealand company, faced penalties totaling NZ$64,000 and was also ordered to cover NZ$9,000 in costs due to a conviction related to an unsafe building utilized for tourist accommodation. The building had been declared "dangerous" in June 2008, but continued to house paying residents in the two months after. After the conviction, Graham made a number of unsuccessful appeals, and a final leave to appeal by both Graham and the company was rejected in December 2014 by the Supreme Court of New Zealand.

== Books by Graham ==
- Inside the Japanese Company. London: Routledge, 2003. doi:10.4324/9780203433638. Hardback ISBN 0-415-30670-1, Adobe eReader ISBN 0-203-34098-1, ebook ISBN 0-203-43363-7.
- A Japanese Company in Crisis: Ideology, Strategy and Narrative. RoutledgeCurzon Contemporary Japan series, 1. London: RoutledgeCurzon, 2005. ISBN 0-415-34685-1.
- Playing at Politics: An Ethnography of the Oxford Union. Edinburgh: Dunedin Academic Press, 2005. ISBN 9781281232168, ISBN 9781906716851, paperback ISBN 978-1-903765-52-4.
