= Wigg =

Wigg may refer to:

- Wigg (cake)
- Wigg (surname)
- Vöggr or Wigg, man in Scandinavian legend notable for giving Hrólfr Kraki (Hroðulf in Beowulf) his cognomen kraki, and for avenging his death
- WIGG (AM), defunct radio station (1420 AM) in Wiggins, Mississippi, United States
- Friedrich Heinrich Wiggers also known as F. H. Wigg, German botanist
- Fatmawati Soekarno Airport (ICAO: WIGG)

== See also ==
- Ludwig Vörg, Ludwig "Wiggerl" Vörg, mountaineer
- Wiig, surname
