= Herbert Mayo (judge) =

South Australian jurist

Herbert Mayo KCMG
- Born: 3 June 1885; Adelaide, South Australia, Australia
- Died: 1 October 1972 (aged 87)
- Education: St Peter's College, Adelaide
- Occupation: jurist
- Known for: judge of the Supreme Court of South Australia (1942–1966)
- Notable work: Law Society of South Australia (1924–1941); South Australian editor of the Australian Law Journal
- Spouse(s): Clarice Gwendoline Thomson Melrose (m. 1911; died 1957); Gwen Alister Brookes, née McInnes (m. 1958)
- Children: 2 sons, 3 daughters
- Parents: George Gibbes Mayo (father); Henrietta Mary Mayo, née Donaldson (mother)
- Relatives: Helen Mayo (sister), Elton Mayo (theorist)

Sir Herbert Mayo (3 June 1885 – 1 October 1972) was a prominent South Australian jurist.

== History ==
Herbert Mayo was born in Adelaide a son of George Gibbes Mayo (–), and Henrietta Mary Mayo, née Donaldson (–). George Mayo was an engineer. Herbert was educated at St Peter's College, Adelaide and studied law at the University of Adelaide, and was called to the Bar in December 1909. He had a practice at Lameroo and Pinnaroo before in 1914 joining with Stanley Murray and Collier Cudmore as the legal firm of Mayo, Murray & Cudmore with offices in Street. Sir Josiah Symon was later to join the firm. In 1929 he joined with William A. "Willie" Magarey (who died later the same year), Ronald Finlayson and J. P. Astley to form Magarey, Finlayson, Mayo & Astley, then became Finlayson, Mayo, Astley & Hayward, with which A. R. Downer and John Hervey Bagot were early associated. He was appointed King's Counsel in 1930.

He served from 1924 to 1941 on the council of the Law Society of South Australia and its president in the years 1932–33, 1934–35 and 1939–41, and was for many years South Australian editor of the Australian Law Journal. He also lectured at the School of Law at the University of Adelaide.

He served from 1942 to 1966 as judge of the Supreme Court of South Australia, replacing (later Sir) Mellis Napier who had been appointed Chief Justice.

== Recognition ==
He was appointed KCMG in the King's Birthday honours list in 1948.

== Family ==
Herbert Mayo married Clarice Gwendoline Thomson Melrose (27 March 1890 – 29 May 1957) on 17 May 1911. She was a daughter of James Melrose (1857–1922) and granddaughter of George Melrose (1806–1894). Their children included:

- Eric Elton Mayo (28 July 1912 – 19 November 1941) who as Lieut. Eric Elton Mayo RAN on 4 July 1939 married (Edith) Janet Allen Simpson (1915–1995), and was lost in the sinking of HMAS Sydney. They had two sons.
- Clarice Elton Mayo (1914– )
- Diana Elton Mayo (1917– )
- George Melrose Elton Mayo (1918– )
- Helen Prudence Elton Mayo (1921– )

He married again, to the widow Gwen Alister Brookes, née McInnes (1908– ) on 3 June 1958.

The medical doctor Helen Mayo (1878–1967) was a sister and the organizational theorist Elton Mayo (1880–1949) was a brother.
