= Metals (journal) =

- Discipline: Metallurgy, engineering
- Language: English
- Edited by: Hugo F. Lopez

Publication details
- History: 2011-present
- Publisher: MDPI
- Frequency: Monthly
- Open access: yes
- Impact factor: 2.351 (2020)

Standard abbreviations
- ISO 4: Metals

Indexing
- ISSN: 2075-4701

Links
- Journal homepage

Metals is a monthly peer-reviewed open access scientific journal covering related scientific research and technology development. It was established in 2011 and is published by MDPI in affiliation with the Portuguese Society of Materials and the Spanish Materials Society. The editor-in-chief is Hugo F. Lopez (University of Wisconsin-Milwaukee). The journal publishes reviews, regular research papers, short communications, and book reviews. There are occasional special issues.

== Abstracting and indexing ==
The journal is abstracted and indexed in:

- Chemical Abstracts
- Current Contents/Engineering, Computing & Technology
- Current Contents/Physical, Chemical & Earth Sciences
- Science Citation Index Expanded
- Scopus
