= Fiona Peterson =

Australian Professor of Transdisciplinary Education

- Other name: J. Fiona Peterson

Academic background
- Education: RMIT University

Fiona Peterson is an Australian academic, and is a full professor at the Auckland University of Technology, specialising in transdisciplinary education and digital education.

== Academic career ==
Peterson completed a Master of Philosophy and a PhD at the Royal Melbourne Institute of Technology. Her dissertation was titled Technologically speaking: creating a strategic knowledge network and the new 'network advantage' for global education. Peterson joined RMIT and was associate professor there before joining the faculty of the Auckland University of Technology in 2019, where she was appointed Professor of Transdisciplinary Education. She is also Deputy Dean of the Faculty of Design and Creative Technologies at Auckland.

Peterson leads and is the chief investigator in the Digital Work Practices collaborative research project at RMIT, which is funded by the Australian Technology Network of Universities. The project is a partnership between RMIT, Queensland University of Technology and University of Technology Sydney to investigate how prepared graduates are for digital working, and to embed digital technologies into curricula. Peterson published a book on creative leadership in education in 2013, published by SensePublishers Rotterdam.

Peterson's paper Profession learning: A continuum reimagined won the 2018 International Excellence Award from The Learner, and her 2015 paper Learning and Teaching Scholarship: Discovery across Disciplines won the 2015 Interdisciplinary Social Sciences International Award for Excellence. In 2008 Peterson was awarded an Australian Learning and Teaching Council Citation Award.

== Selected works ==
- Peterson, J. Fiona; Cathy Lockhart; Kerin Elsum; Bronwyn Clarke; Catherine Raffaele (2018). "Professional Learning: A Continuum Reimagined". The International Journal of Learning. 25 (1): 39–55. doi:10.18848/1447-9494/cgp/v25i01/39-55. Wikidata Q126687306.
- Peterson, J. Fiona (2009). "Strategic knowledge networks for global education". London Review of Education. doi:10.1080/14748460802700652. Wikidata Q111218164.
- Peterson, J. Fiona; Cathy LOCKHART; Catherine RAFFAELE (2019). "Adaptive digital capability development". Conference Proceedings of the Academy for Design Innovation Management. 2 (1). doi:10.33114/adim.2019.07.237. Wikidata Q126687310.
- Peterson, J. Fiona; Peter Fray; Penelope Williams (2020). "Digital Capabilities and Connecting the Dots for Evolving Work Practices: Are We There Yet?". International Journal of Learning in Higher Education. 27 (2): 27–42. doi:10.18848/2327-7955/cgp/v27i02/27-42. Wikidata Q126687308.
- Peterson, J. Fiona; Tania Ka’ai; Valance Smith; McPherson, Kathryn Margaret (2023). "Re-imagining student success: Integrating strategy and action through an Indigenous lens". Art, Design and Communication in Higher Education. 22 (2): 209–239. doi:10.1386/adch_00075_1. Wikidata Q126687305.
- Peterson, J. Fiona; Derek Walker (2006). "Preparing for Leadership: Knowledge Networks in Postgraduate Education". International Journal of Knowledge, Culture and Change Management. 5 (5): 169–176. doi:10.18848/1447-9524/cgp/v05i05/49574. Wikidata Q123347259.
