= Banzai Japan =

Japanese idol group

- Origin: Tokyo, Japan
- Genres: J-pop
- Years active: 2014–present
- Labels: Cospanic Entertainment
- Members: Fumi Fujisaki; Sasa Sasagawa; Shiori Fujisaki; Maika Ando; Yūki Mochimaru; Kana Ichinose; Rino Ibusuki; Riko Ueno; Aira Tsukumo; Yū Kōsaka; Nino Yūnagi; Arisu Hoshino
- Past members: See former members
- Website: cospanic.com/banzai-japan/

Banzai Japan (バンザイジャパン) is a Japanese girl group formed in 2014 with the aim of uniting all forty-seven of Japan's prefectures.

== History ==
Banzai Japan made their major label debut with the single "Juunin Toiro / Kingyo no Uta" through Rock Fields' sub-label Victoria Beats in June 2019. Their second major single, "Jumpin'! Nappu! Japan!", was released in March 2020. Their third major single, "Banzai Fighter / Engi ga Ii Machi / Yell Delivery", was released in January 2021. They released their fourth major single, "Afrodynamite / Otomegokoro", in February 2022. Their fifth major single, "Cheer Dance Time / Let Me Cryyyyyyyyyyy / Hibana, Odoriuta", was released in February 2023. They released their sixth major single, "Nippon Isshū Ai no Gohan Tabi / Banzai! Banzai! / Curtain Call", in June 2024.

== Members ==
=== Current ===
2nd generation (2015)

- Fumi Fujisaki (藤崎ふみ)

3rd generation (2015)

- Sasa Sasagawa (笹川ささ)

5th generation (2017)

- Shiori Fujisaki (藤崎しおり)

7th generation (2019)

- Maika Ando (安堂舞花)

8th generation (2020–2021)

- Yūki Mochimaru (餅丸夢姫)
- Kana Ichinose (一ノ瀬かな)

10th generation (2022)

- Rino Ibusuki (指宿理乃)
- Riko Ueno (上野りこ)
- Aira Tsukumo (九十九愛桜)
- Yū Kōsaka (神坂優羽)
- Arice Hoshino (星乃ありす)

11th generation (2023)

- Nino Yūnagi (悠凪ニノ)

=== Former ===
1st generation (2014–2015)

- Yuna Shinkai (新海由奈)
- Mizu Minamo (水萌みず)
- Sayo Hanasaka (花坂小夜)
- Nagi Takahashi (髙橋なぎ)
- Mei Yasuhara (安原めい)
- Yuki Komachi (小町ゆき)

2nd generation (2015)

- Himawari Nakano (中野向日葵)
- Julia Asahi (朝日珠莉愛)
- Rima Minato (皆戸理芳)

3rd generation (2015)

- Kyoko Tomonaga (友永響子)
- Aya Izumi (和泉彩)

4th generation (2016)

- Naru Minami (実波なる)
- Rin Shida (志田りん)
- Koma Nakayama (仲山コマ)
- Maria Nabana (菜花まりあ)

5th generation (2017)

- Mau Araragi (蘭まう)
- Itsuki Sato (佐藤樹姫)
- Ayumi Harukawa (春川愛美)
- Rena Shimada (島田玲奈)

6th generation (2018)

- Tsukasa Fujitani (藤谷つかさ)
- Kū Satonaka (里中空)
- Saya Hanaki (花城沙耶)
- Yūmi Asahina (朝日奈ゆうみ)

7th generation (2019–2020)

- An Hatsuki (羽月杏)
- Emino Matsuda (松田恵実乃)
- Airi Takijima (滝嶌愛梨)
- Nonoka Chikugo (筑後ののか)

8th generation (2020–2021)

- Haruna Mizusawa (水沢はるな)
- Mio Hoshizora (星空みお)
- Meru Sakura (咲良める)
- Aoi Nanase (七瀬あおい)

9th generation (2021)

- Honoka Yamaguchi (山口穂花)
- Riai Jinguuji (神宮寺莉愛)

10th generation (2022)

- Ari Takahashi (高橋あり)

== Discography ==
=== Digital albums ===
Title	Album details
Ichi Fuji Ni Taka San Banzai! (一富士二鷹三ばんざい！)	Released: September 25, 2017; Label: Cospanic Entertainment; Formats: digital download

=== Singles ===
Title	Year	Peak chart positions	Album
Title	Year	Oricon	Album
"Yamato Nadeshiko no Hi ga Noboru" (大和撫子の日が昇る)	2016	—	Ichi Fuji Ni Taka San Banzai!
"Konya mo Tottemo Dance de Zansu!" (今夜もとってもダンスでざんす!)	2018	—	Non-album singles
"Juunin Toiro / Kingyo no Uta" (十人十色/金魚の歌)	2019	15	Non-album singles
"Jumpin'! Nappu! Japan!" (ジャンピン!なっぷ!Japan!)	2020	10	Non-album singles
"Banzai Fighter / Engi ga Ii Machi / Yell Delivery" (Banzai Fighter/縁起が良い街/エールデリバリー)	2021	15	Non-album singles
"Afrodynamite / Otomegokoro" (アフロダイナマイト/乙女心)	2022	9	Non-album singles
"Cheer Dance Time / Let Me Cryyyyyyyyyyy / Hibana, Odoriuta" (チアダンスタイム/Let Me Cryyyyyyyyyyy/火花、踊唄)	2023	11	Non-album singles
"Nippon Isshū Ai no Gohan Tabi / Banzai! Banzai! / Curtain Call" (日本一周愛のご飯旅/バンザイ!バンザイ!/カーテンコール)	2024	12	Non-album singles
"—" denotes releases that did not chart or were not released in that region.
