= Alexander Melrose =

Australian politician

Alexander John Melrose (18 March 1889 – 6 September 1962) was a politician in the State of South Australia.

== History ==
Alexander Melrose, c. 1940.

Melrose was born at Kooringa, the only son of the noted philanthropist Sir John Melrose (1860–1938), of Ulooloo, and his wife Emily Eliza Melrose, née Edhouse (1862–1923). Alex's grandfather, George Melrose (1806–1894), was a Scottish pioneer settler of South Australia. Jimmy Melrose, the famous aviator, was a cousin.

Melrose was educated at St. Peter's College, and was early involved in running the station, as his father lost his sight around 1901. He lived at Kadlunga station, Mintaro, where he bred Merino sheep, Jersey cattle, and Percheron horses. He also had an interest in Oakbank Station in South Australia and Williambury, in the Gascoyne River district of Western Australia.

Melrose was a long time member of the District Council of Stanley and its chairman for twelve years, until its amalgamation with the District Council of Clare, and continued as a member of the larger council. He was involved in the establishment of the Clare and District Hospital, then after its incorporation in 1925 was on its board of management, including a stint as chairman. He was a director of Mintaro Slate and Flagstone Company. He was a member of the council of the S.A. Polo Association for six years, captain of the Clare Polo Club, and a foundation member of the Watervale Golf Club.

Melrose was president of the Liberal and Country League and represented the Liberal Party in the House of Assembly seats of Burra Burra 1933-1938 and Stanley 1938–1941. He was elected to a Midland District seat in the Legislative Council 1941–1962.

== Family ==
In 1913, Melrose married Jane Florence "Jennie" Lewis (17 March 1884 – 24 August 1970), daughter of John Lewis; their children included:

- Evonne Ashley Melrose (24 February 1915 – 4 May 1996) married on 10 December 1937 James Elder "Jim" Gosse (4 September 1910 – 10 October 1973). They had four children.
- Eleanor Emily Brook "Poss" Melrose (14 March 1917 - 29 October 2004) married on 25 November 1939 Richard Stanley Carstairs "Dick" Rymill (12 September - 15 July 1997). They had two children. After a divorce on 1 April 1963 Eleanor married on 19 February 1966 Peter Edwin Siekmann (18 October 1909 – 6 Jul 1998). No issue - they remained together for the rest of their lives.
- John Lewis Melrose (21 April 1924 – 29 January 1987) educated at St. Peter's College, never married. Lived at and managed Kadlunga, Mintaro all his life.

== See also ==
- George Melrose#Family for more information on Melrose's family
