= Fiona Bloom =

American music industry publicist

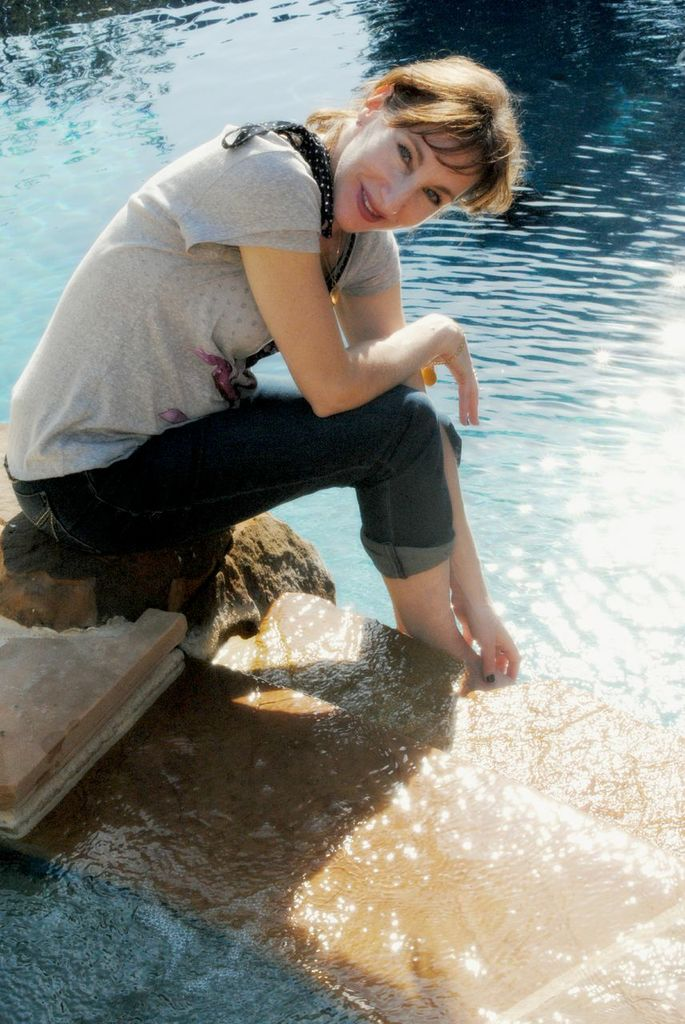
- Occupation: Music industry publicist

Fiona Bloom is a music industry publicist who runs the New York City agency The Bloom Effect.

== Early life ==
Bloom grew up in St John's Wood, London. She took piano lessons as a child and trained to be a concert pianist. She moved to the U.S. after her father moved to Atlanta, Georgia for business reasons. She started training as a disk jockey and worked at college radio in Georgia State University.

== Career ==
After receiving a degree in Speech Communications, Bloom began her professional career in 1991 at WSTR FM as the station's assistant music director, and she also served as an on-air personality. In 1994, EMI Records head Daniel Glass appointed her to the position of Director of New Artist Marketing. After working at EMI, Bloom served as the Director of Media Relations at Zero Hour Records. She started her own subsidiary record label, called 3-2-1, in 1996.

Bloom started her agency The Bloom Effect in 2007. That year, she was named Top Consultant/Strategist of the Year by the National Association of Recording Industry Professionals (NARIP). Her agency represents acts including Jesse Clegg and Wayna, who was subsequently nominated for a Grammy Award.

In 2013, Bloom set up StoryTime, a twice-weekly children's book reading session which now runs at Butterfly 7, a children's store in Brooklyn. She says the sessions are "very interactive" and have a musical element.
