= George Melrose =

George Melrose (22 December 1806 – 8 April 1894) was a Scottish pioneer of South Australia, whose descendants were prominent in pastoral and professional circles.

== History ==
George Melrose (22 December 1806 – 8 April 1894), the last surviving son of John Melrose of Balerno, Scotland, left his homeland on the Palmyra, arriving in 1839. He gained experience as a sheep farmer; first on the Bremer River, then at Macclesfield with (later Sir) Walter W. Hughes; next at Mount Barker with Robert Lawson of Padthaway; then took up land on the South Rhine (now Marne River), the foundation of what would become "Rosebank", his Mount Pleasant property. All the neighboring country having been taken up, he embarked on a number of exploratory expeditions, mostly east of the Murray, and in 1846 started to invest in the Lake Victoria region, and moved there with his new wife in 1847. After squatting there for seven years negotiations with the New South Wales government broke down, and the lease was awarded to someone else, so he returned to Mount Pleasant, which he and his family built up over the decades. The homestead was built in 1858. He later also purchased "Wangaraleednie" (near Franklin Harbor, from two doctors named McKechnie), Borthwick Brae, and Ulooloo runs.

== Family ==
On 24 May 1847 Melrose married Euphemia Thomson (20 April 1829 – 31 October 1887), a daughter of John Thomson originally of Kirkcaldy, Scotland, who arrived in South Australia aboard Moffatt in December 1839 and settled at "Lily Bank", Mount Pleasant. Their children were:

- Janet "Jessie" Melrose (15 March 1848 – 27 September 1939) married Dr. Hugh Ferguson MRCS JP. (c. 1832 – 25 June 1887) on 22 October 1868

- Alice Effie Ferguson ( – 29 June 1949) cared for her uncle Alex at "Chiverton", Wattle Park, and was bequeathed by him a parcel of land which became Ferguson Conservation Park, near Stonyfell, South Australia.

- Elizabeth Thomson Melrose (15 October 1853 – 18 March 1945) married John Murray (c. 1849 – 28 May 1885) on 29 November 1877.

- Sir John Stanley Murray (1884–1971) married (Winifred) Olive Wigg (1885–1964), a granddaughter of E. S. Wigg, on 8 June 1910.
She married again, to Archibald MacDiarmid (c. 1847 – 19 August 1930) on 26 March 1890.

- George Thorburn Melrose (18 June 1855 – 11 May 1924), of "Rosebank"
- James Melrose (29 June 1857 – 16 April 1922), of Wangaraleednie Station, Franklin Harbor; later of "Glenwood", Aldgate, married Isabel Mary Edhouse (June 1849 – 8 November 1908) on 6 August 1881. They had five children. He sold up the station and moved to "Glenwood", Aldgate, destroyed by fire in April 1900 and rebuilt. Their family included:

- Effie Jessie Melrose (15 July 1882 – 25 November 1910) married David Fulton on 18 April 1906. She died of pneumonia as a complication of measles.
- Florence Isabel Melrose (15 Apr 1884 – 3 October 1958) was engaged to T. Hope Murray, Jr. in August 1908.
- Clarice Gwendoline Thomson Melrose (27 March 1890 – 29 May 1957) married Herbert Mayo KC (3 June 1885 – 1 October 1972) on 17 May 1911. Mayo was a partner in law firm Symon, Mayo, Murray and Cudmore.
- George Stanley Melrose (3 November 1886 – 31 January 1927) married Ethel Janet Baker in 1920, owned "Willogoleche", Hallett. They had two sons and a daughter.
- Eric Nesbit Melrose (c. 1888 – 1 December 1909) died of meningitis
He married again, on 4 July 1912, to Hildergarde "Hilda" Westley Billing ( – ), a sister of Noel Billing. He died at their winter home in Glenelg. She sold "Glenwood" in 1923. They had only one child:
- Charles James Melrose, universally known as Jimmy Melrose, (13 September 1913 – 5 July 1936), a noted aviator.

- Sir John Melrose (12 January 1860 – 16 September 1938), of Ulooloo, lost his sight in 1901. He was a noted philanthropist. He married Emily Eliza Edhouse (1862–1923) on 17 April 1886. They had three children:

- Emily Jessie Melrose (20 January 1887 – 19 December 1911). She married Charles Gerald Hack (27 September 1874 – 7 March 1936) on 29 October 1910, they had no children.
- Alexander John Melrose (18 March 1889 – 6 September 1962) married Jane Florence Lewis (17 March 1884 – 24 August 1970) on 1 March 1913; she was a daughter of John Lewis (1844–1923). He was MHA 1933–1941 and MLC 1941–1962 and president of the Liberal and Country League. They had three children.
- Lillie Margaret Melrose (17 Apr 1891 – 22 Jun 1970) married Arthur Gaynor Owen Smyth (2 October 1897 – 3 June 1970) on 12 December 1939; they had no children. Lillie cared for her father at Ulooloo.

- Robert Thomson Melrose (22 April 1862 – 26 April 1945), of Rosebank; pastoralist and politician. He married Gwendoline Grace Lawrie (1908–1991) they had no children.
- Alexander "Alex" Melrose (16 May 1865 – 2 September 1944), a lawyer, was partner with Hermann Homburg in Homburg & Melrose, Adelaide. His significant donations to the Art Gallery of South Australia were commemorated in the Melrose Gallery. He never married.
- Lillie Margaret Jane "Lily" Melrose (25 Mar 1870 – 10 March 1932) married Dr. Henry Higham Wigg (18 July 1858 – 22 April 1950), a son of E. S. Wigg, on 29 April 1891.
