= Fiona Highet =

British entomologist

Fiona Highet MBE
- Education: University of Glasgow (BSc)
- Scientific career
- Workplaces: SASA

Fiona Highet MBE is an entomologist based in Scotland. She is an expert in bees and is Entomology Manager at SASA (formerly Science and Advice for Scottish Agriculture).

== Education and career ==
Highet was awarded a BSc in Zoology at the University of Glasgow in 1997, in 1999 she started working at SASA as a diagnostician in virology and zoology, subsequently working her way up to Entomology Manager and Senior Entomologist.

Her work looks at insects of agricultural importance including aphids, in particular Highet works on the health of bees, she has been involved in research into the metagenomics of honeybees in Scotland and she works as part of the Scottish Bee Health Team. Highet has also been involved in outreach working with school groups to investigate bee parasites.

== Honours and awards ==
In June 2018 Highet was awarded the Member of the British Empire in the Queen's birthday honours for services to bee health.
