= Fiona Gell =

- Born: Fiona Rachel Gell; 1972/1973; Ormskirk, England
- Other names: FR Gell; Fiona R Gell
- Education: University of York

Fiona Rachel Gell (born 1972/1973) is a Manx marine biologist and writer. Working for the Department of Environment, Food & Agriculture (DEFA), she oversaw the establishment of the Isle of Man's ten Marine nature reserves among other work. Isle of Man Today called her "one of the leading voices fighting to protect our island's marine surroundings". Her debut book Spring Tides: Exploring Marine Life on the Isle of Man was published in 2022.

== Early life and education ==
Gell spent her early childhood in Liverpool. When she was 6, she relocated to her paternal family's home the Isle of Man, where Gell grew up along Ramsey Bay in the north of the island.

Gell graduated with a Bachelor of Science (BSc) in Biology from the University of York 1995 and completed a PhD in 1999. Her PhD focused on seagrass fisheries in the Quirimbas Islands.

== Career ==
Gell held postdoctoral research, lecturer and fellowship positions at the University of York, the University of Liverpool and Newcastle University. Her work included co-authoring the study "Benefits Beyond Boundaries: The Fishery Benefits of Marine Reserves" with Callum Roberts. Gell returned to the Isle of Man to work in the University of Liverpool's Port Erin Marine Laboratory.

After the Port Erin Marine Laboratory closed in 2006, Gell joined the Isle of Man Government's Department of Environment, Food & Agriculture (DEFA) as Senior Marine Biodiversity Officer. In this role, Gell worked to establish Ramsey Bay as the island's first Marine Nature Reserve in 2011. By 2018, the number of marine nature reserves established by Gell and her team around the island grew to 10. Gell advocated for engagement with local communities and the fishing industry to bring about the reserves. In 2016, the Isle of Man became the first whole island jurisdiction to be designated a UNESCO Biosphere Reserve. Gell appeared in an installment of Countryfile on BBC Two. Gell was awarded the inaugural UCM Honorary Fellowship in 2017.

Gell later headed the DEFA's Ecosystem Policy team. Gell helped develop the Isle of Man's Climate Change Act 2021. She joined the delegation representing the Isle of Man at the COP26 in Glasgow with Daphne Caine and Richard Lole.

In 2020, Weidenfeld & Nicolson acquired the rights to publish Gell's debut book Spring Tide in 2022. She had previously written poetry for publications such as The Stinging Fly and Wasafiri and contributed to The Guardian. Described as a "nature memoir", the book charts Gell's personal journey and career while surveying the Isle of Man's ecology. Spring Tides was selected as a Book of the Month by Martin Chilton of The Independent.

Gell won the 2023 Corlett Bolton Research Award.

== Bibliography ==
=== Books ===
- Spring Tides: Exploring Marine Life on the Isle of Man (2022)

=== Select academic articles ===
- "Diversity of fishes in seagrass beds in the Quirimba Archipelago, northern Mozambique" (2002) in Marine and Freshwater Research, with Mark W Whittington
- "Benefits Beyond Boundaries: The Fishery Benefits of Marine Reserves" (2003) in Trends in Ecology & Evolution, with Callum Roberts
- "In Deep Water: Exposing the hidden impacts of oil and gas on the UK's seas" (2023) in Uplift and Oceana, with et al
- "Communicating the complexity of Marine Protected Areas in creative writing: A personal perspective" (2025) in Marine Policy
