= Robert Thomson Melrose =

Australian politician and pastoralist

Robert Thomson Melrose (22 April 1862 – 26 April 1945) was a pastoralist and politician in South Australia.

== History ==
Melrose's parents George Melrose (22 December 1806 – 8 April 1894) and Euphemia, née Thomson, (died 1887) left Balerno, Scotland, on the Palmyra, arriving in 1839. George established a sheep run at Macclesfield with (later Sir) Walter W. Hughes, later settled at Mount Pleasant.

Robert was educated at Prince Alfred College, then settled on the family property "Rosebank", of 5,800 acres (2,300 ha) at Mount Pleasant, where he was a very successful breeder of Aberdeen Angus cattle and Merino sheep, and was involved in extensive tree planting.

He was a director of Elder, Smith & Co., Ltd., and from 1917 until his death was a longtime member of the Stockowners' Association and the Agricultural and Horticultural Society and its president 1919–1920.

He was chairman of the Anti-Cancer Campaign at the University of Adelaide and on the board of the Adelaide Botanic Garden.

He was a keen golfer.

== Politics ==
Melrose was a member of the Legislative Council from 1921 to 1927.

== Family ==
Robert T. Melrose was a second generation member of a large and influential South Australian family founded by George Melrose.

He was married, leaving a widow, Gwendoline Grace Melrose (1908–1991). They had no children.
