= Fiona Melrose =

South African novelist

- Born: 1973 (age 52–53); Johannesburg, South Africa
- Education: University of the Witwatersrand; Birkbeck, University of London
- Years active: 2016–present

Fiona Melrose (born 1973) is a South African novelist. She is known for her novels Midwinter (2016), Johannesburg (2018) and Even Beyond Death (2025).

== Early life and education ==
Melrose was born in Johannesburg. Melrose graduated with a Bachelor of Arts (BA) and a Master of Arts (MA) in Politics and Literary Criticism, both from the University of the Witwatersrand. After working in finance, she later completed a second MA in Creative Writing at Birkbeck, University of London.

== Career ==
Via Corsair (a Little, Brown Book Group imprint), Melrose's debut novel Midwinter was published in 2016. She wrote the novel while staying with her brother in Woodbridge, Suffolk. Midwinter was longlisted for the Women's Prize for Fiction and shortlisted for the New Angle Prize.

Melrose reunited with Corsair for the publication of her second novel Johannesburg in 2018. Based on Virginia Woolf's Mrs Dalloway, the novel takes place over a single day in December 2013. Melrose is the second novelist after Karel Schoeman to write a South African Mrs Dalloway tribute, which was the subject of a 2023 comparative academic article by Andrew van der Vlies of the University of Adelaide. Johannesburg was shortlisted for the Royal Society of Literature (RSL) Encore Award and also longlisted for a South African Sunday Times CNA Literary Award.

Melrose returned in 2025 with her third novel and first work of historical fiction Even Beyond Death. Set in 1657 Avignon, the novel follows the relationship between Jehan, Marquis de Baudelaire and his Dutch valet Jonathan Kryk. Even Beyond Death was named one of the best historical fiction books of 2025 by The Sunday Times (UK).

== Bibliography ==
- Midwinter (2016)
- Johannesburg (2018)
- Even Beyond Death (2025)

== Accolades ==
Year	Award	Category	Title	Result	Ref.
2017	New Angle Prize		Midwinter	Shortlisted	
2017	Women's Prize for Fiction		Midwinter	Longlisted	
2018	Royal Society of Literature	Encore Award	Johannesburg	Shortlisted	
2019	Sunday Times CNA Literary Awards	Barry Ronge Fiction Prize	Johannesburg	Longlisted	
