= Jimmy Melrose =

Australian aviator

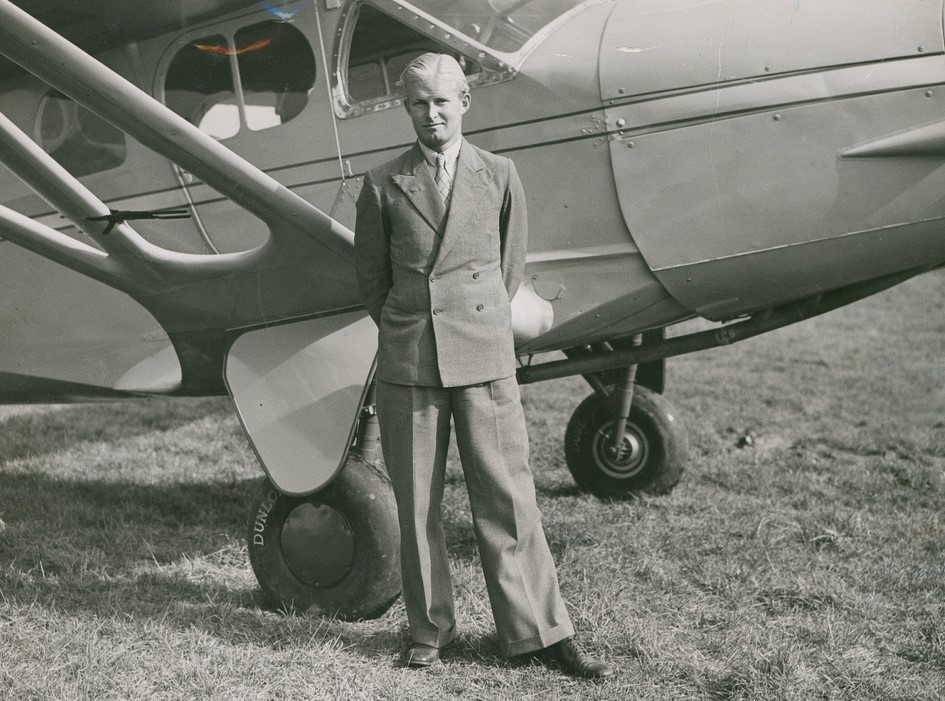

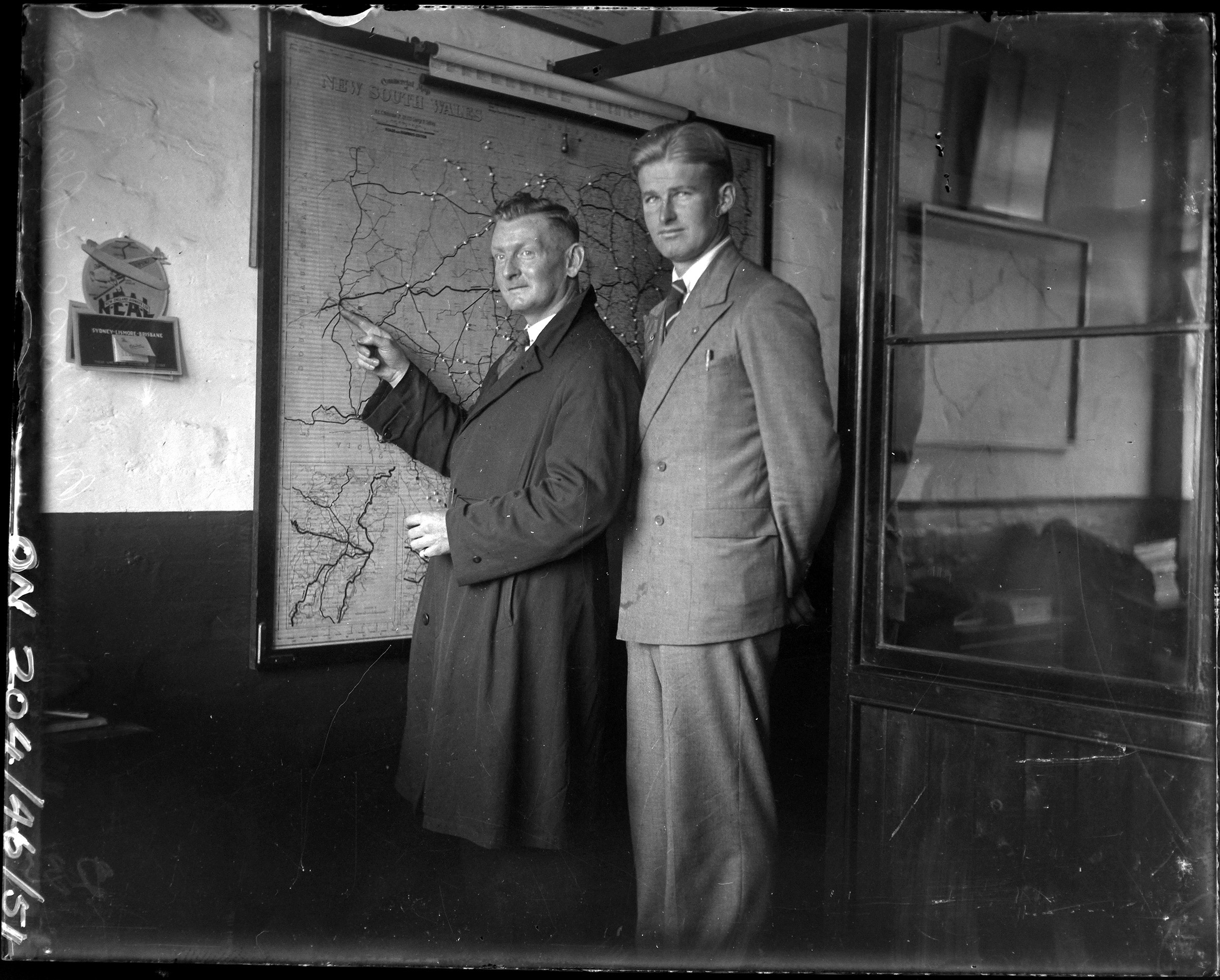
C. J. Melrose (right) with Shell's Captain F. S. Briggs at Shell's Sydney office in August 1934.

Charles James Melrose (13 September 1913 – 5 July 1936) was an Australian aviator who held a number of flying records, and was the youngest and only solo flier to finish the Melbourne (MacRobertson) Centenary Air Race in 1934.

== History ==
Melrose was a son of James Melrose of Wangaraleednie Station, Franklin Harbor, near Cowell, South Australia, a member of the wealthy pastoral family headed by George Melrose (1806–1894) of "Rosebank", Mount Pleasant. His mother, Hilda Westley Melrose, née Billing, the second wife of James Melrose, died a few months before Melrose's 10th birthday. He was educated at St. Peter's College and took his first flying lessons at Parafield Airport while still at school, gaining his pilot's licence at age 19.

He flew a DH80A Puss Moth registered VH-UQO and christened My Hildergarde to England just after his 21st birthday to compete in the race, reaching Croydon in a record 8 days, 9 hours. He finished the race in sixth place in 10 days, 16 hours, earning second on handicap. He was the youngest, and only solo, flier to complete the course. He also owned a Leopard Moth, a faster plane that could not be made ready in time for the race. He gained much assistance from his uncle, Noel Billing, founder of the Supermarine company.

In November 1935, while returning to Australia in a Percival Gull Four, registered VH-UVH and christened Westley, he helped in the unsuccessful search for Sir Charles Kingsford Smith around the Bay of Bengal. Melrose had been the last person to sight Kingsford Smith's Lockheed Altair in the night air as it flew above him. A public appeal to reward him financially was decried by his uncle Sir John Melrose, pointing out that the family could well afford to support Jimmy's hobby. Australia was at that time in the grip of the Great Depression.

On his return from the Air Race, Melrose was considering giving up racing and turning his mind to commencing an air taxi service, something virtually non-existent in the mid-1930s.

== Death ==
He died in July 1936, at the age of 22, when his new high-wing monoplane Billing, a Heston Phoenix registration VH-AJM, broke up in turbulence over South Melton, Victoria on a charter flight from Melbourne to Darwin. His passenger was mining manager Lt. Col Alexander George Campbell, DSO. Two days later, over one hundred thousand people lined the streets of Melbourne to pay their last respects to Melrose.

== Legacy ==
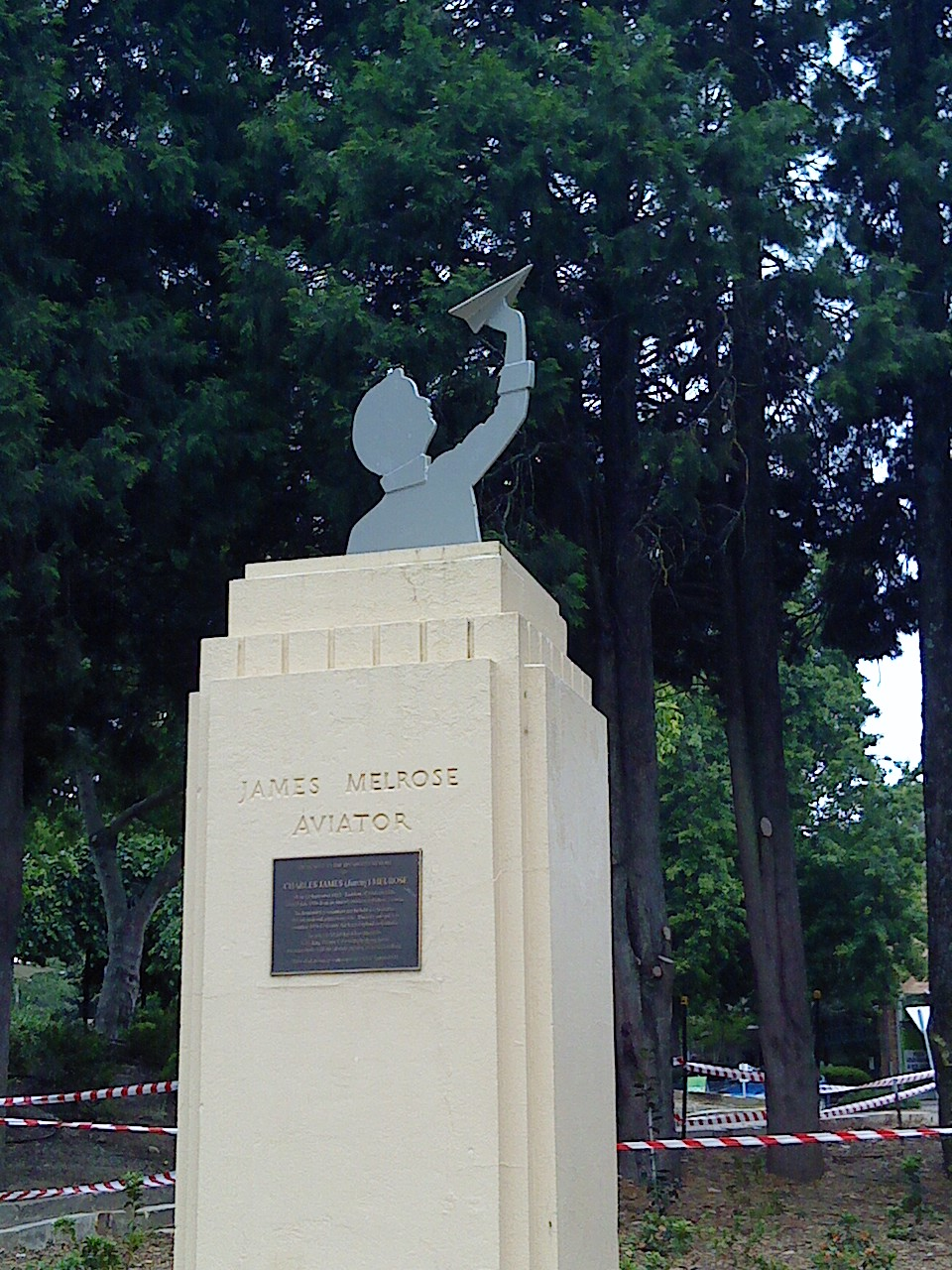
Melrose memorial in Stirling, SA

In Australia, the suburbs Melrose Park, New South Wales and Melrose Park, South Australia are both named after him, as is James Melrose Road, which runs along the southern boundary of Adelaide Airport. In the United Kingdom, Charles Melrose Close in Mildenhall, Suffolk, where the 1934 Air Race originated, is also named after him.

A monument to his memory was erected at Stirling, South Australia, and has been recently renovated. He spent much of his childhood, before the death of his father, at "Glenwood" in nearby Aldgate. A memorial plaque marks the family home at 13 South Esplanade, Glenelg, which was their winter residence from around 1916, then later their only home.

== Sources ==
- Gunton, Eric The Jimmy Melrose Story, Australia's Youngest Air Ace. Published by the author 1990. ISBN 0646002740
- Blake, Helen Boy Phoenix, C James Melrose. Angus and Robertson 2008. ISBN 9780980654400
