= Tunstall, Suffolk =

Village and civil parish in Suffolk, England

Coordinates: 52.144°N 1.45°E

Tunstall
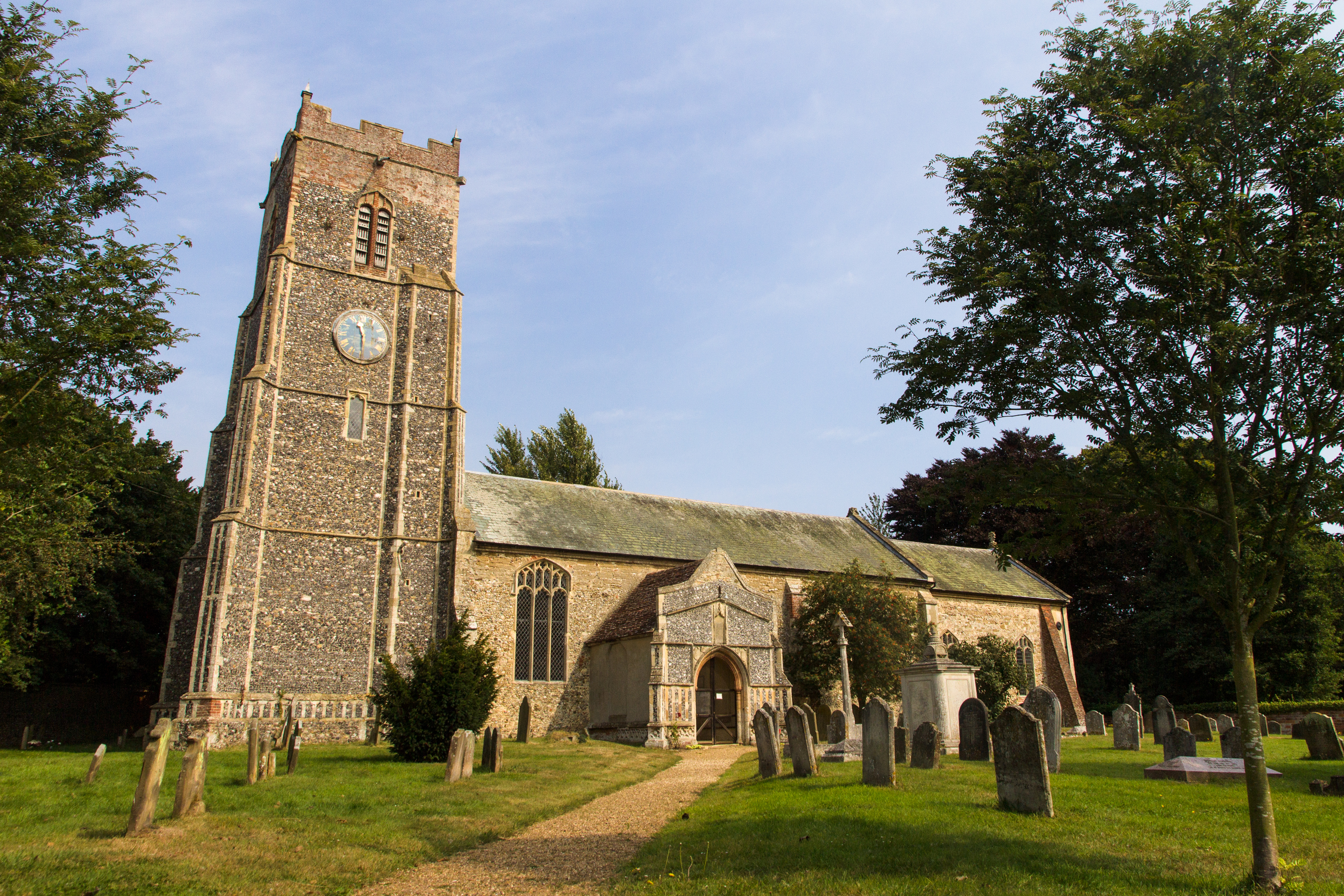
- Church of St Michael and All Angels, Tunstall

- Location within Suffolk
- Population: 513 (2011)
- District: East Suffolk
- Shire county: Suffolk
- Region: East
- Country: England
- Sovereign state: United Kingdom
- Post town: Woodbridge
- Postcode district: IP12
- UK Parliament: Suffolk Coastal

Tunstall is a village and civil parish in Suffolk, England. There are two settlements named Tunstall next to each other, 7.5 miles (12.1 km) north east of Woodbridge. However, these are not two separate villages but one, despite the gap between the main village and the hamlet known as Tunstall Common. Both lie within the parish of Tunstall.

The village itself is a good-sized settlement with a pub (The Green Man) and a church called St Michael's, notable for its unusual box pews. Half a mile away, Tunstall Common has a dozen houses and a Baptist chapel. Residents of the hamlet consider themselves to live at Tunstall on the Common, and letters are either addressed to The Common, Tunstall, or Tunstall Common.

Tunstall Common itself is a Site of Special Scientific Interest (SSSI), a fragment of the ancient sandling dry lowland heath that was once extensive across this area of coastal Suffolk. It lies next to Tunstall Forest, which was started in the 1920s as a pine plantation. In the Great Storm of 1987, Tunstall Forest lost thousands of trees and the opportunity was taken to diversify the mix of trees planted. The area is in the Suffolk Coast and Heaths Area of Outstanding Natural Beauty and is a haven for wildlife, including fallow deer and muntjac. The adjacent Rendlesham Forest is known for the former RAF Bentwaters site, now in private ownership, and alleged alien sightings in the 1980s.

The Snape Maltings complex is within the parish of Tunstall.

== Literary references ==
- The Black Arrow by Robert Louis Stevenson is set in Tunstall hamlet and forest.
