= Clydebank Co-operative Society =

Retail co-operative in Clydebank, Scotland

Clydebank Co-operative Society Limited
- Type: Consumer Co-operative
- Industry: Retailing; Funerals; Post offices
- Founded: 1881
- Headquarters: Clydebank, Scotland, UK
- Area served: Clydebank
- Revenue: £14.1 million (FY 2022/23)
- Website: realco-op.co.uk

Clydebank Co-operative Society Limited is the smallest consumers' co-operative in Scotland, based in the town of Clydebank near Glasgow. Along with Scotmid and The Co-operative Group, it is one of three consumer co-operative retail societies in Scotland, and the only one not merged into a regional or national society.

Unusually for co-operatives in the United Kingdom, it is not a member of Co-operatives UK. However, in its founding year of 1881, it joined the Scottish Co-operative Wholesale Society. Before the second world war, community leader Jenny Hyslop was one of the society's organisers.

Until 2013, Clydebank Co-op had buying arrangements with the Co-operative Retail Trading Group (CRTG), a buying group managed by The Co-operative Group, the successor of SCWS, which also manages The Co-operative brand.

In 2013/2014, Clydebank Co-op left the CRTG, agreeing to buy from local wholesaler JW Filshill, and co-brand its six stores with Filshill's KeyStore brand.

In 2012 Clydebank Co-op became the main sponsor of Clydebank FC, which is a community fan owned football club.

== Stores ==
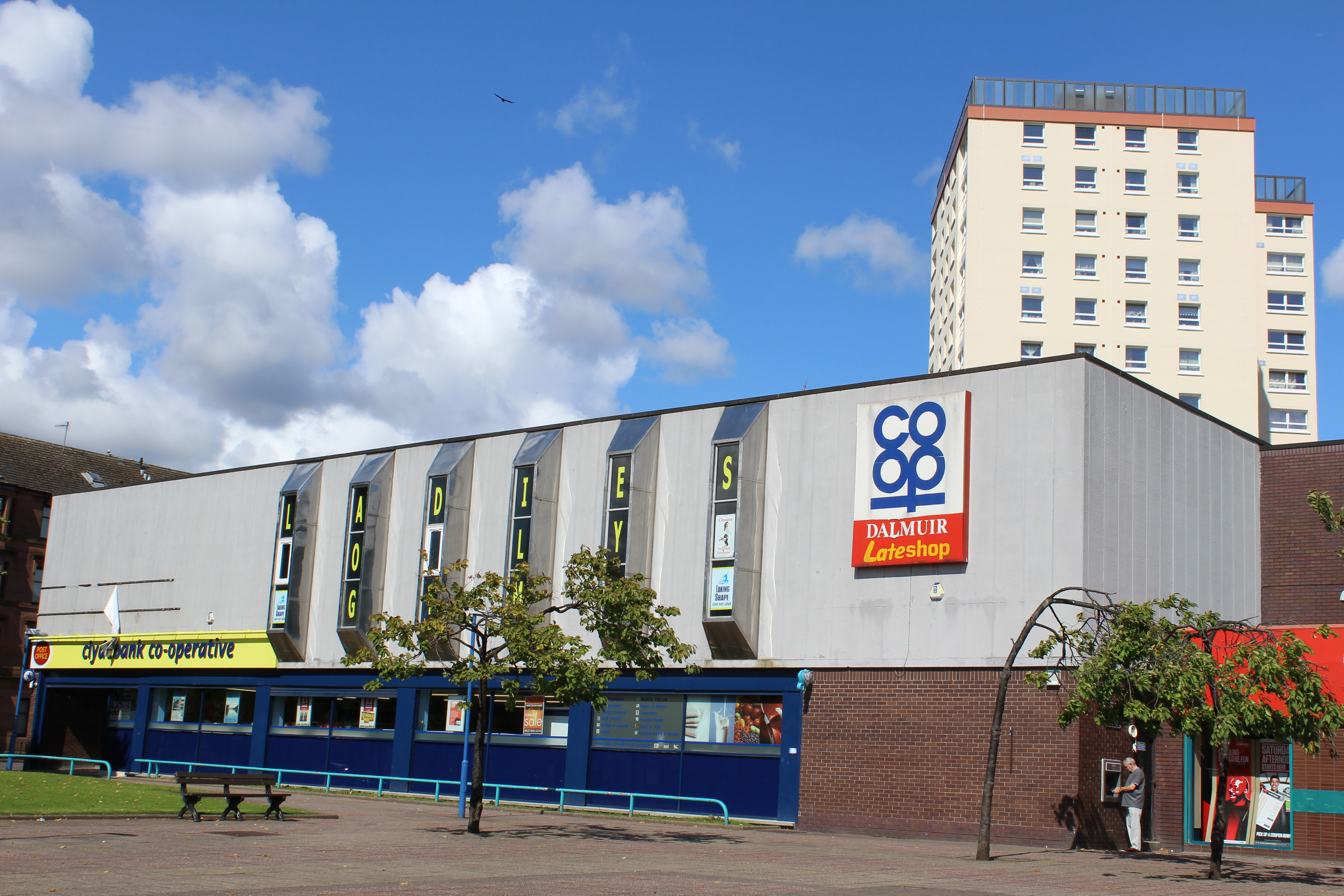
The co-operative's largest store, on Dunn Street, Dalmuir.

As of 2015, the society operates seven food stores ranging from just over 6,500 square feet at Dunn Street, to its smallest, 1,800 square feet (170 m^{2}), at Great Western Road & Sylvania Way South, Clydebank

- Great Western Road, Knightswood
- Faifley Road, Faifley
- Sylvania Way South, Clydebank
- Kilbowie Road, Clydebank
- Dunn Street, Dalmuir
- Duntocher Road, Parkhall

In 2014, it closed its Hardgate food store, reducing the number of its food stores from seven to six. The Hardgate store later reopened as a Co-op/KeyStore More and continues to trade.

== See also ==
- British co-operative movement
