= Kilwinning Old Parish church =

Church building in North Ayrshire, Scotland

Coordinates: 55°39′14.29″N 4°41′52.65″W

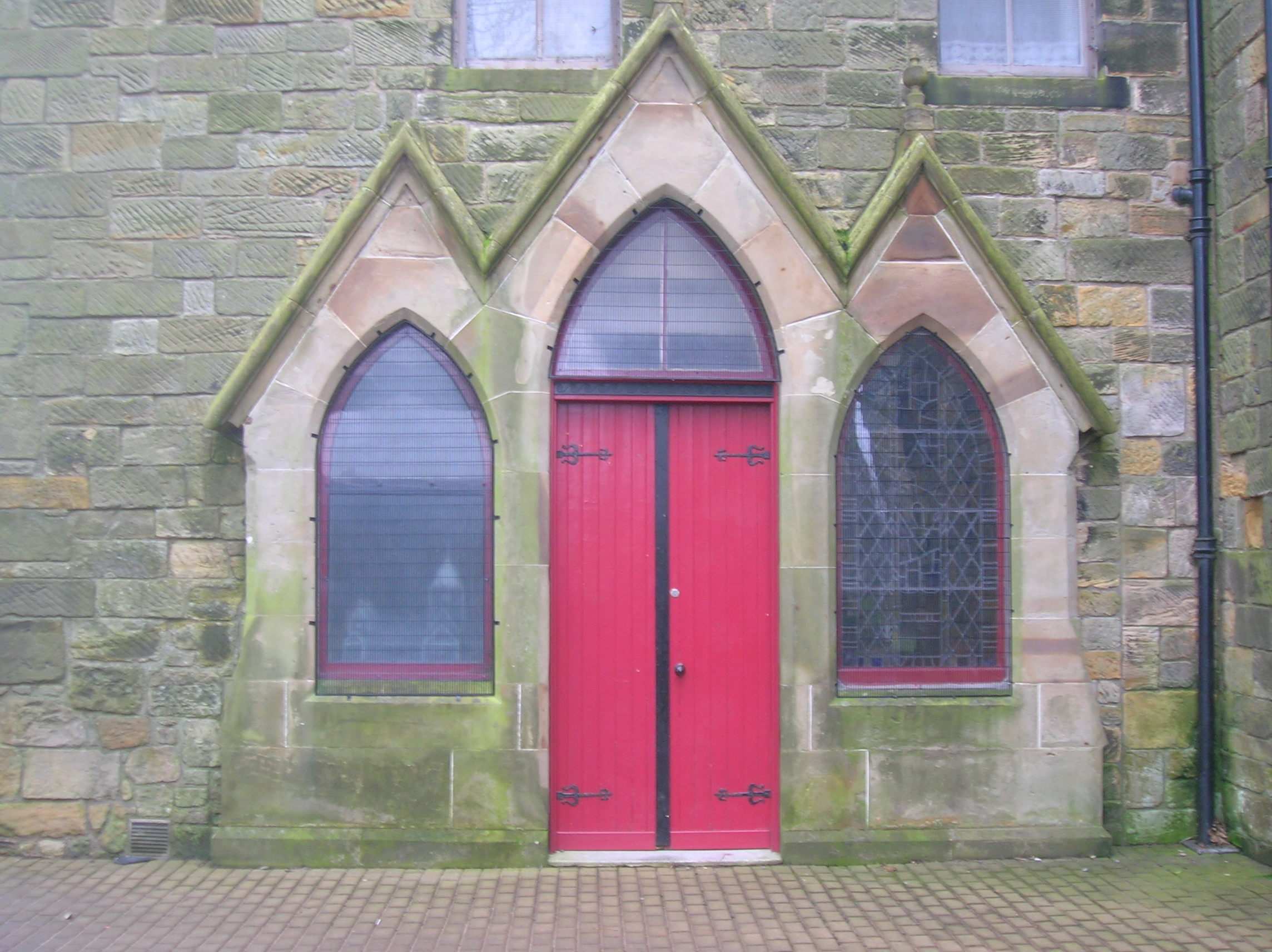
The church entrance

Kilwinning Old Parish church is located (NS 30321 432940) on the site of the old Kilwinning Abbey, North Ayrshire, Scotland.

== History ==
=== The first parish church ===
It is often claimed that the abbey was destroyed during or shortly after Scottish Reformation, but there is no real evidence for this and Timothy Pont, the famous cartographer stated that most of it was still standing in the early 1600s. The structure of this monastery, said Pont, ‘was solid and grate, all of freestone cutte, the church fair and staitly after ye modell of yat of Glasgow, with a fair steiple of 7 score foote of height, yet standing quhen I myselve did see it.’ He also saw the original abbey records, further proof that it was not destroyed by the Reformers, though they may have been kept at Eglinton Castle by then. Without the revenues from church lands and property, the parish church could not afford to maintain a great building already damaged by wind and weather and as it deteriorated, local builders, including the Earls of Eglinton, helped themselves to a lot of free building material. A'new' parish church seems to have been constructed in the ruins, sometime after that date Pont visited, reusing existing stones. The first Protestant minister was William Kilpatrick in 1587.

=== The existing Abbey church ===
This building was designed by John Swan and built by John Wright and John Garland at the cost of £546, being completed in 1774 on the site of its 16th century predecessor. It was constructed at the expense of the Earl of Eglinton. An old stone bearing the arms of the Eglinton family and the date 1593 is incorporated into a wall of the church.

==== The church interior ====
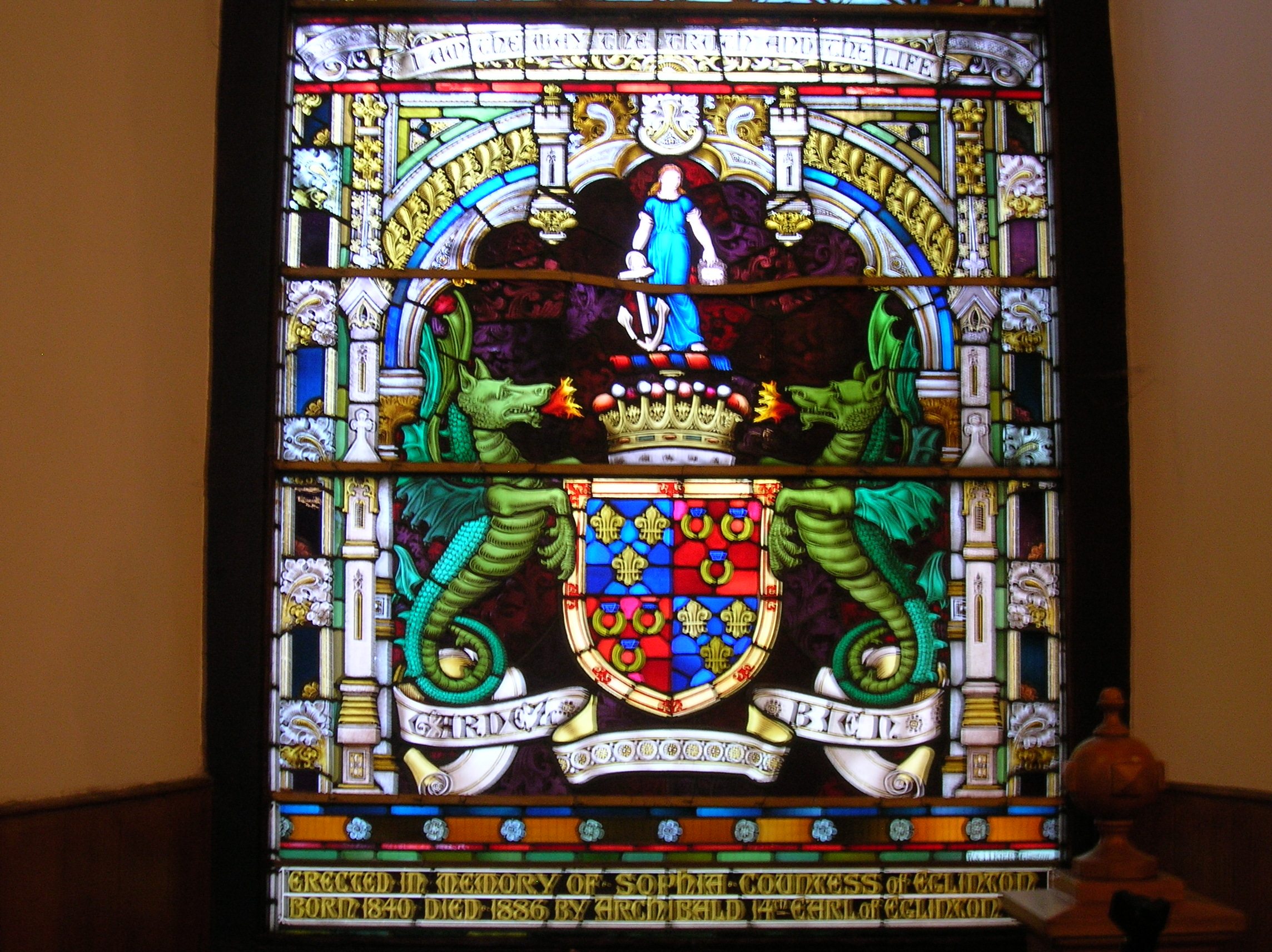
Memorial window to Lady sophia Montgomerie

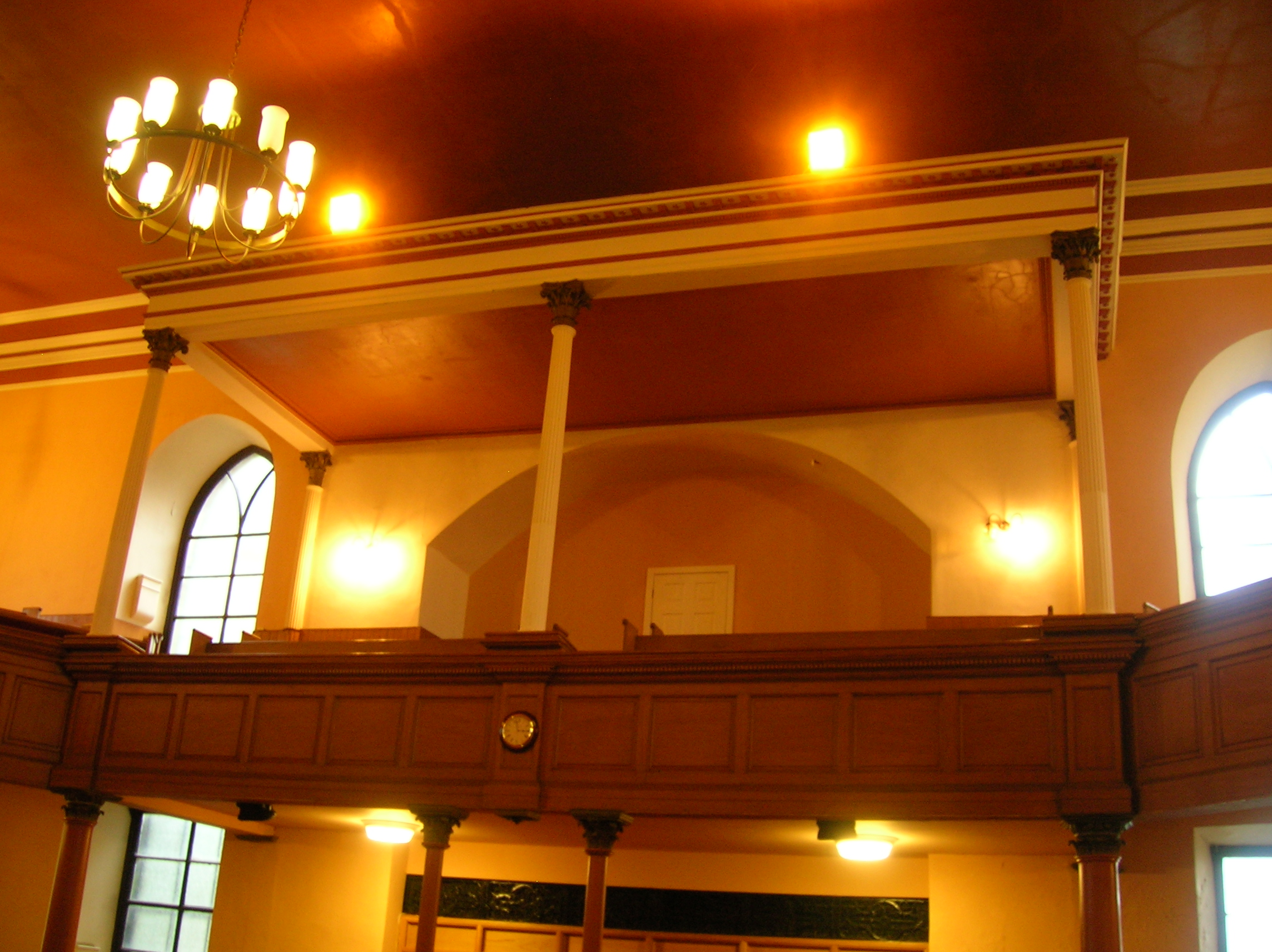
The Eglinton Loft or Gallery and its Corinthian columns

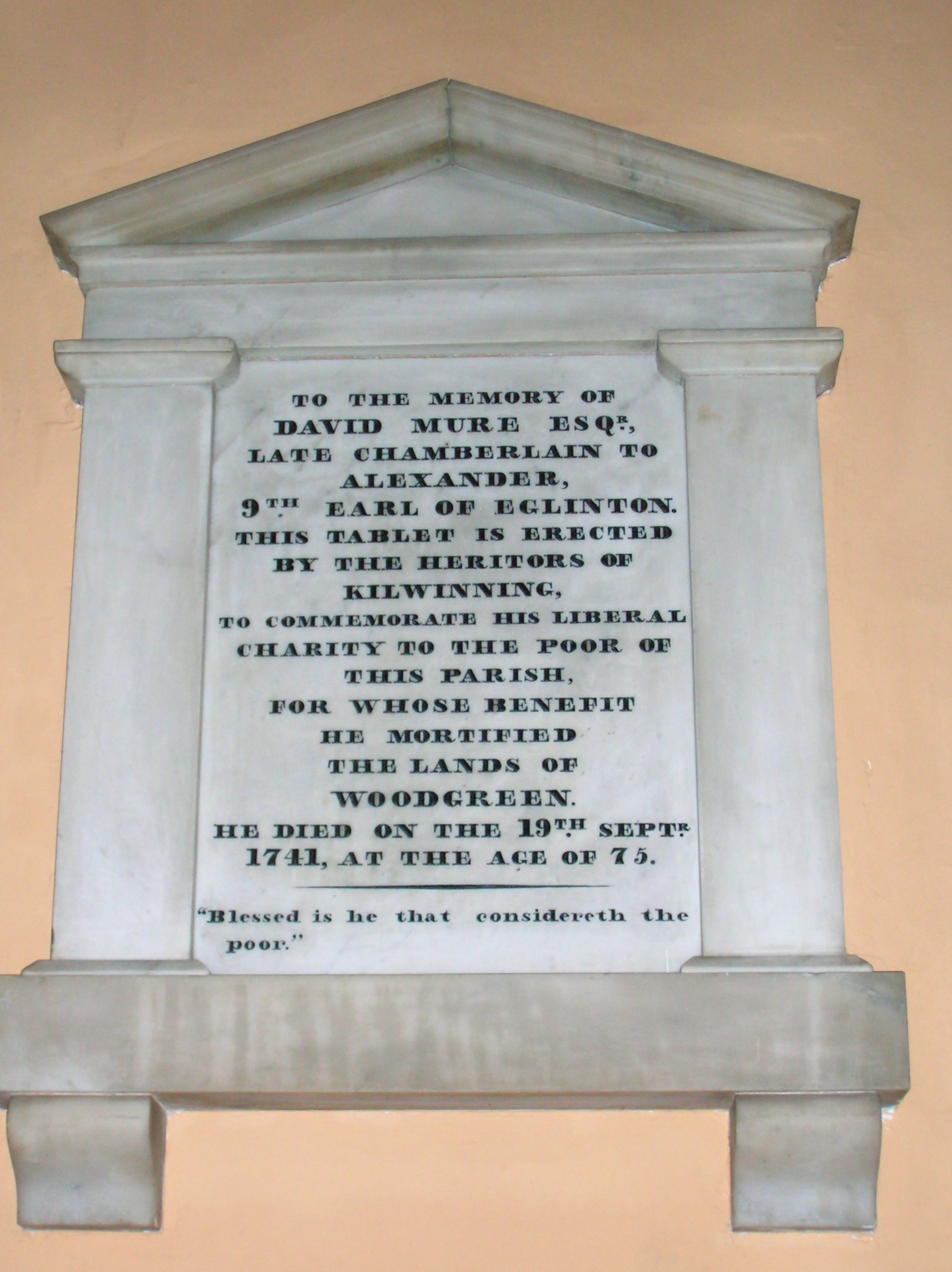
Memorial to David Mure

The interior is a little less spartan and austere than the exterior. A prominent feature is the Eglinton Loft or Gallery, built as an area for the exclusive use of the Earls of Eglinton and their retinue. A private entrance and the Eglinton Room, complete with fireplace, provided the deference and comfort that the Earls expected.

The fine organ was built by Foster and Anderson in 1897. The Memorial Screen was dedicated in 1990 to the memory of Colonel A. R. Cole-Hamilton who died at Gallipoli in 1915, his mother Sarah, and his wife Gladys. The screen features the coat of arms of the Cole-Hamiltons and the seal of the Abbot of Kilwinning Abbey.

The church has some fine stained glass windows, including one to Lady Sophia Montgomerie, Countess of Eglinton and wife of the 9th Earl of Eglinton and another by Stephen Adam to the Rev Lee Ker, minister of this church and author of a detailed book on the churches of Kilwinning. The Conn and Hendrie families are likewise commemorated as are James Gaul, Alexander Stewart, Thomas Borland, and the Rev Archibald Hunter.

An 800th Tapestry was created by the members and friends of the Abbey church to celebrate the 800th anniversary of the founding of the abbey.

An unusual marble memorial stone is to David Muir, Chamberlain to the 9th Earl of Eglinton, who generously left his lands of Woodgreen to the poor of the parish.

The tower of the old abbey fell in 1814, however it was rebuilt on a smaller scale by Messrs Connell of Dalgarven, who also built the Eglinton Tournament Bridge, the architect being David Hamilton. Considerable restorations were made on the choir of the abbey church and in parts of the nave in 1814.

== The churchyard ==
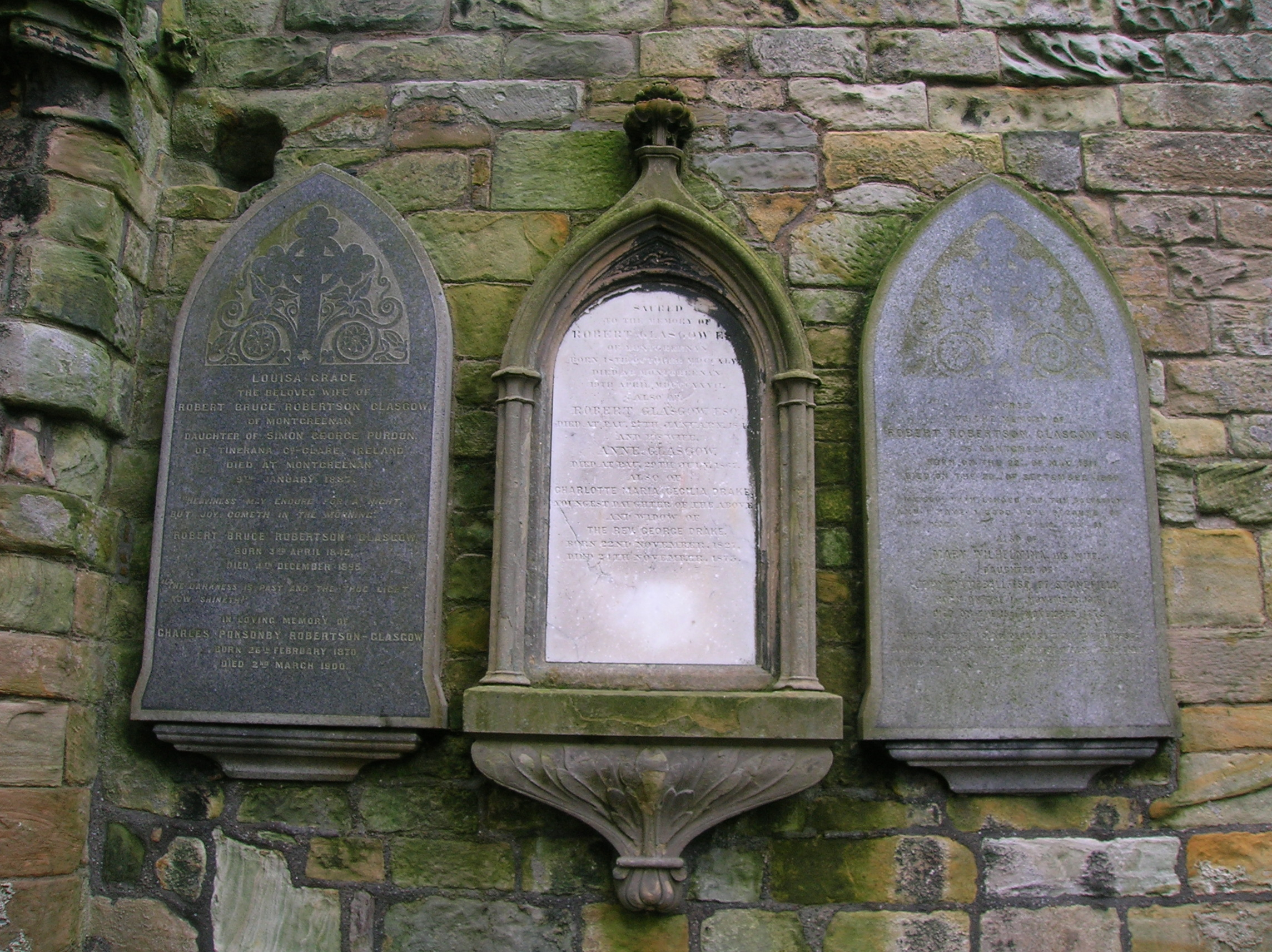
The Glasgow family memorials

The Glasgow's of Montgreenan are buried here, as are the said David Muir (see photograph), a number of the Earls of Eglinton and their families, as well as the Reverend Doctor James Steven who Robert Burns mentions in 'The Calf'.

== Views of the church and grounds ==
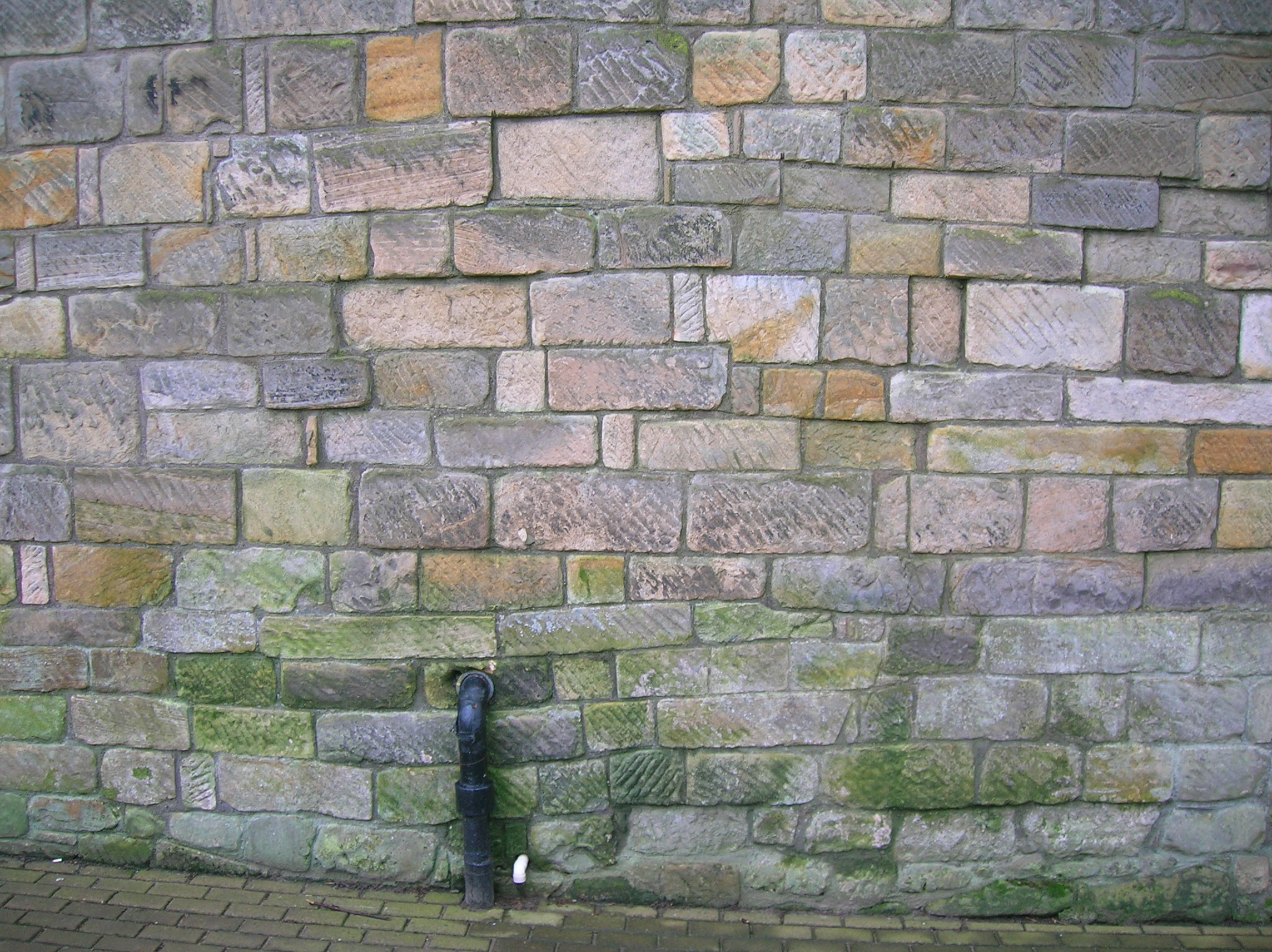
Irregular recycled ashlar stonework

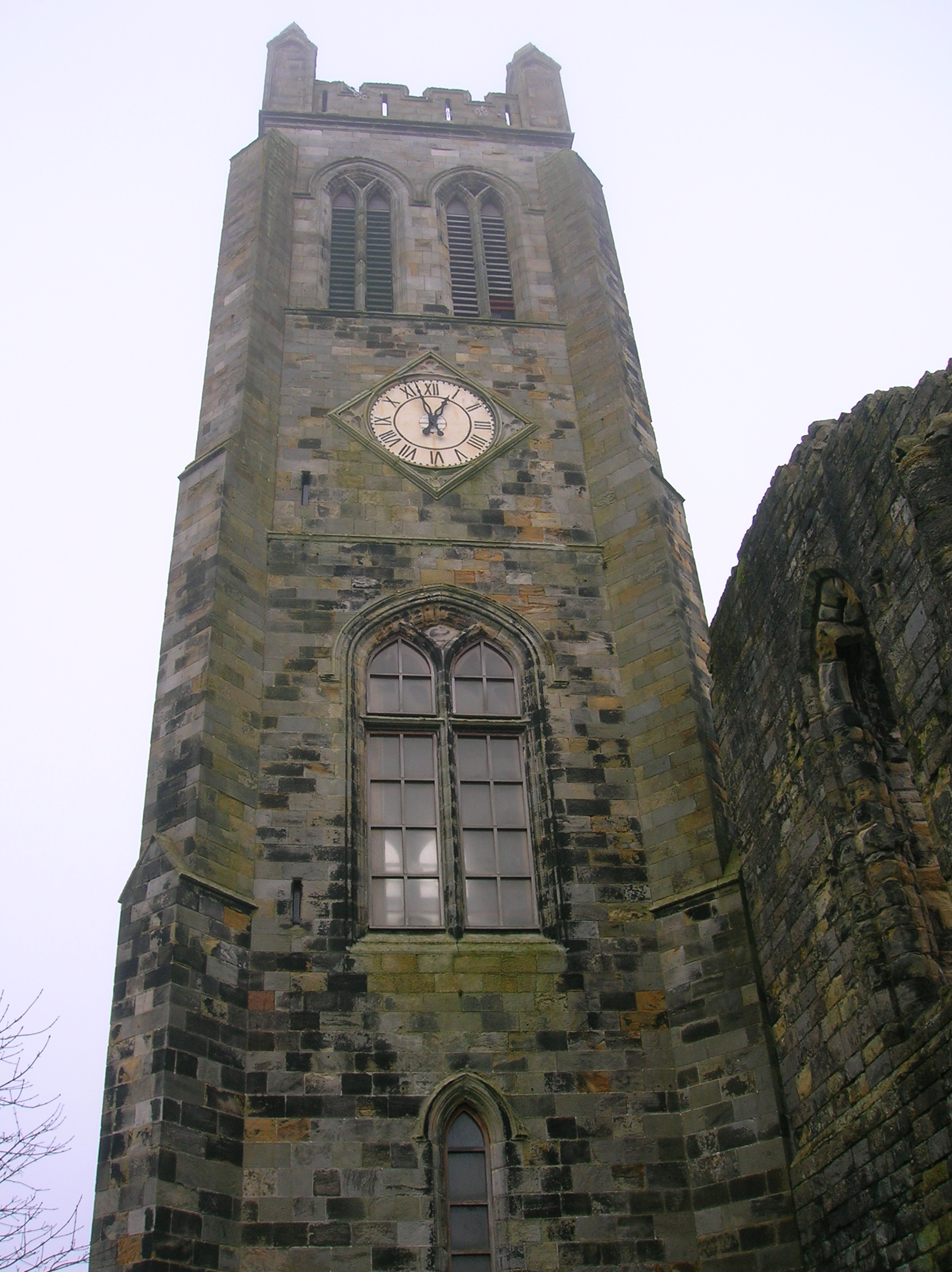
The Kilwinning church tower

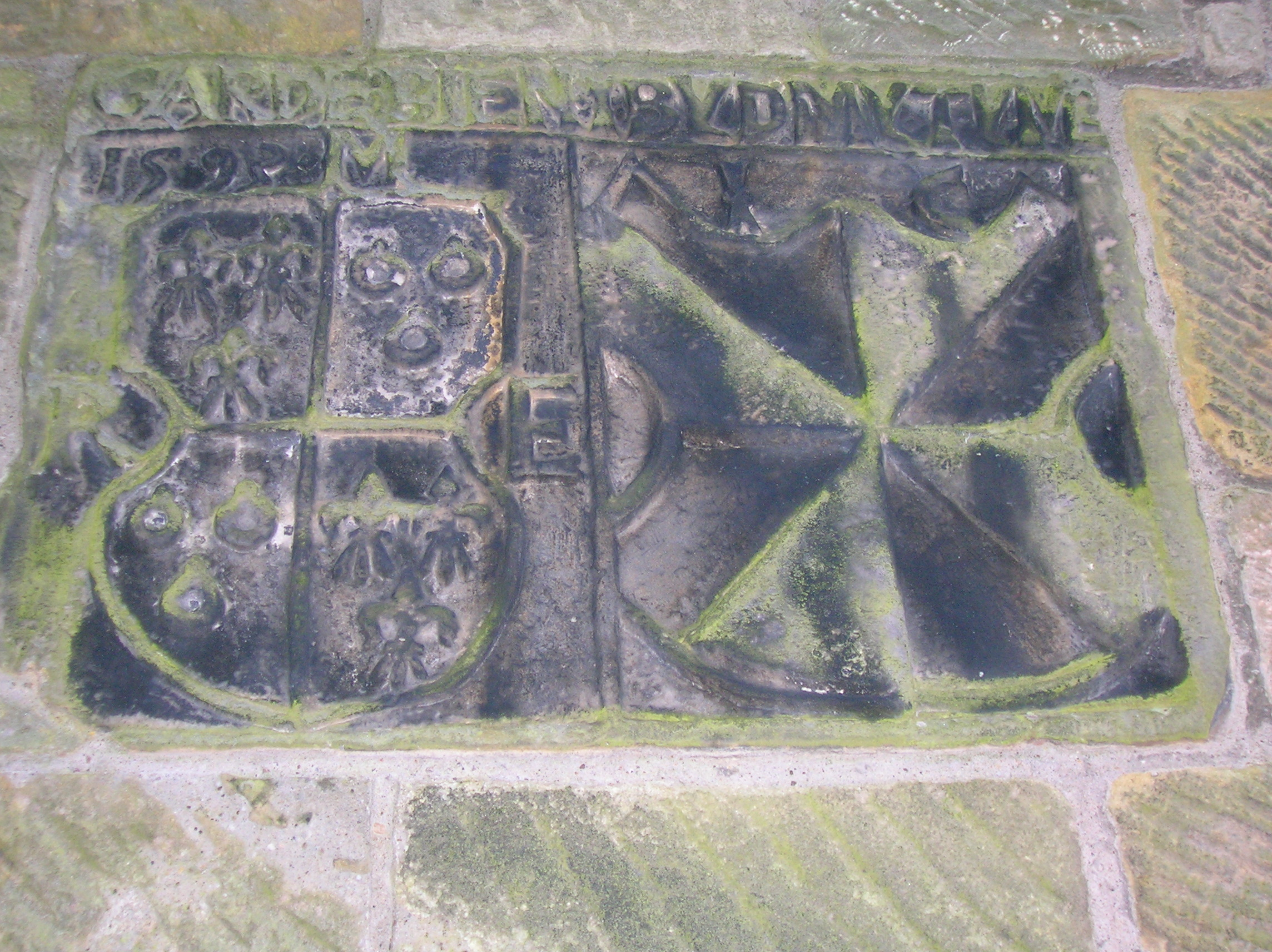
Coats of arms of the Earls of Eglinton and Loudoun

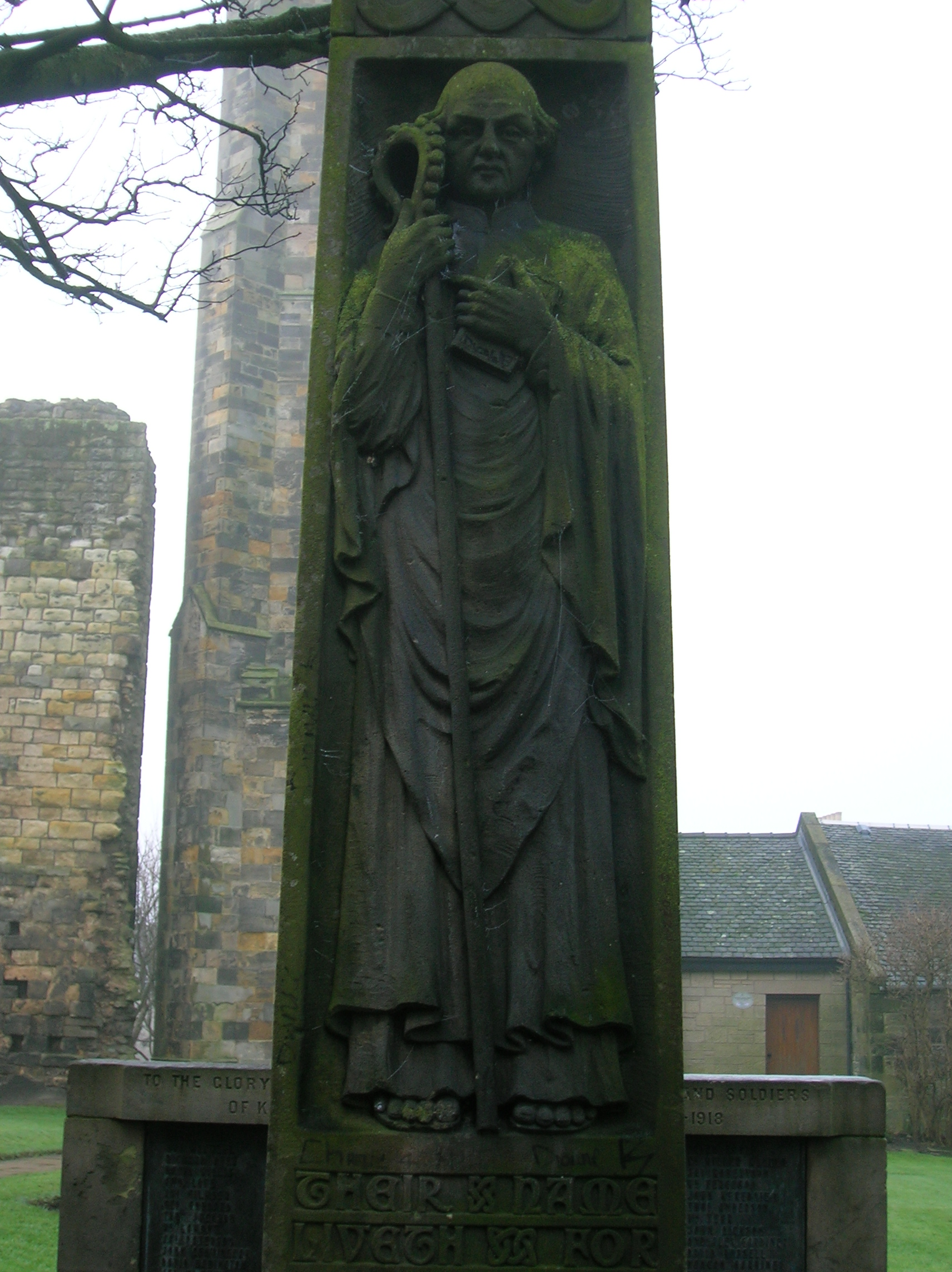
Saint Winning as part of the WW2 Memorial

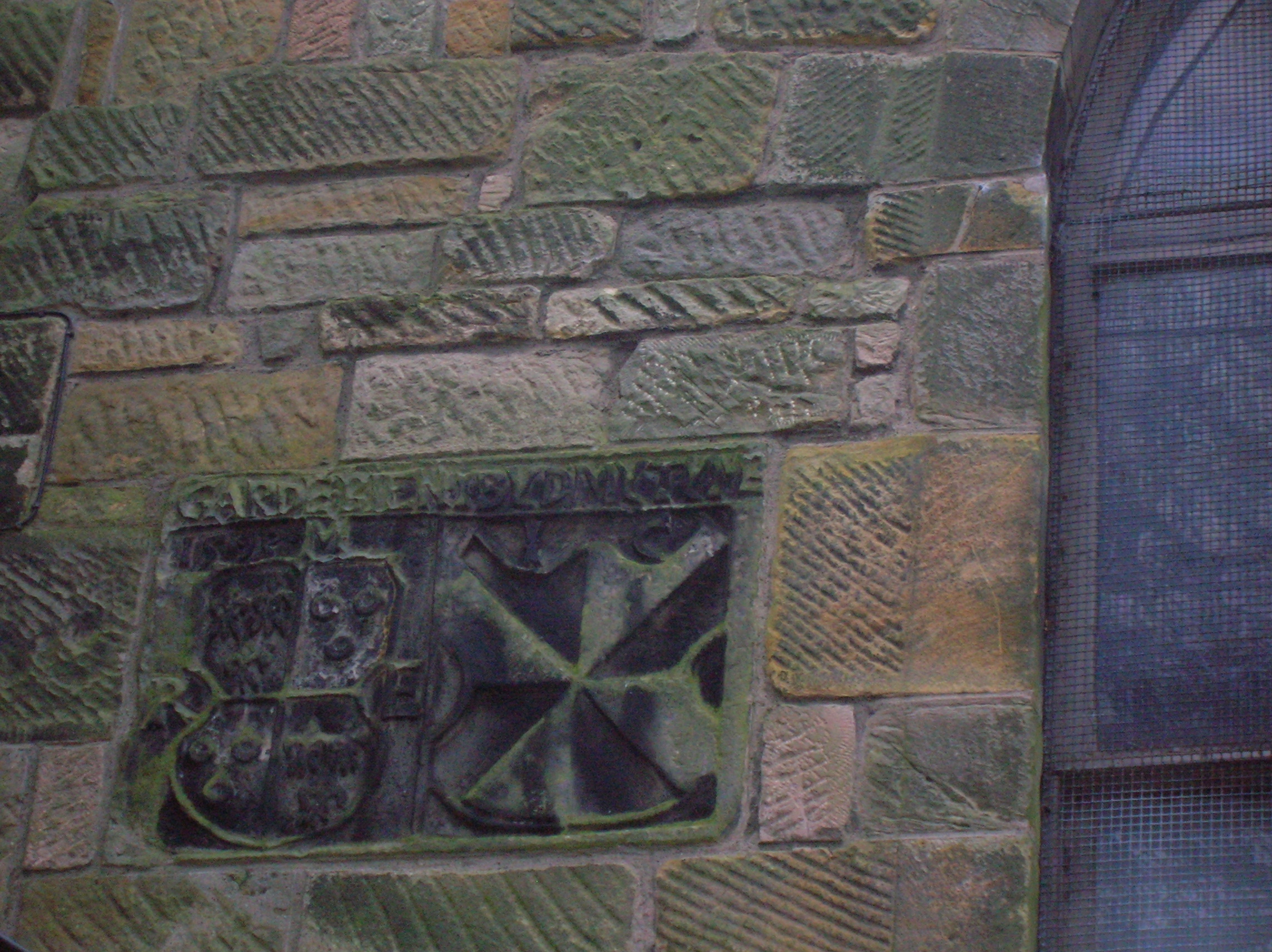
Campbell and Montgomery conjoined arms

== See also ==
- Eglinton Castle
- Eglinton Country Park
