= List of Category A listed buildings in East Dunbartonshire =

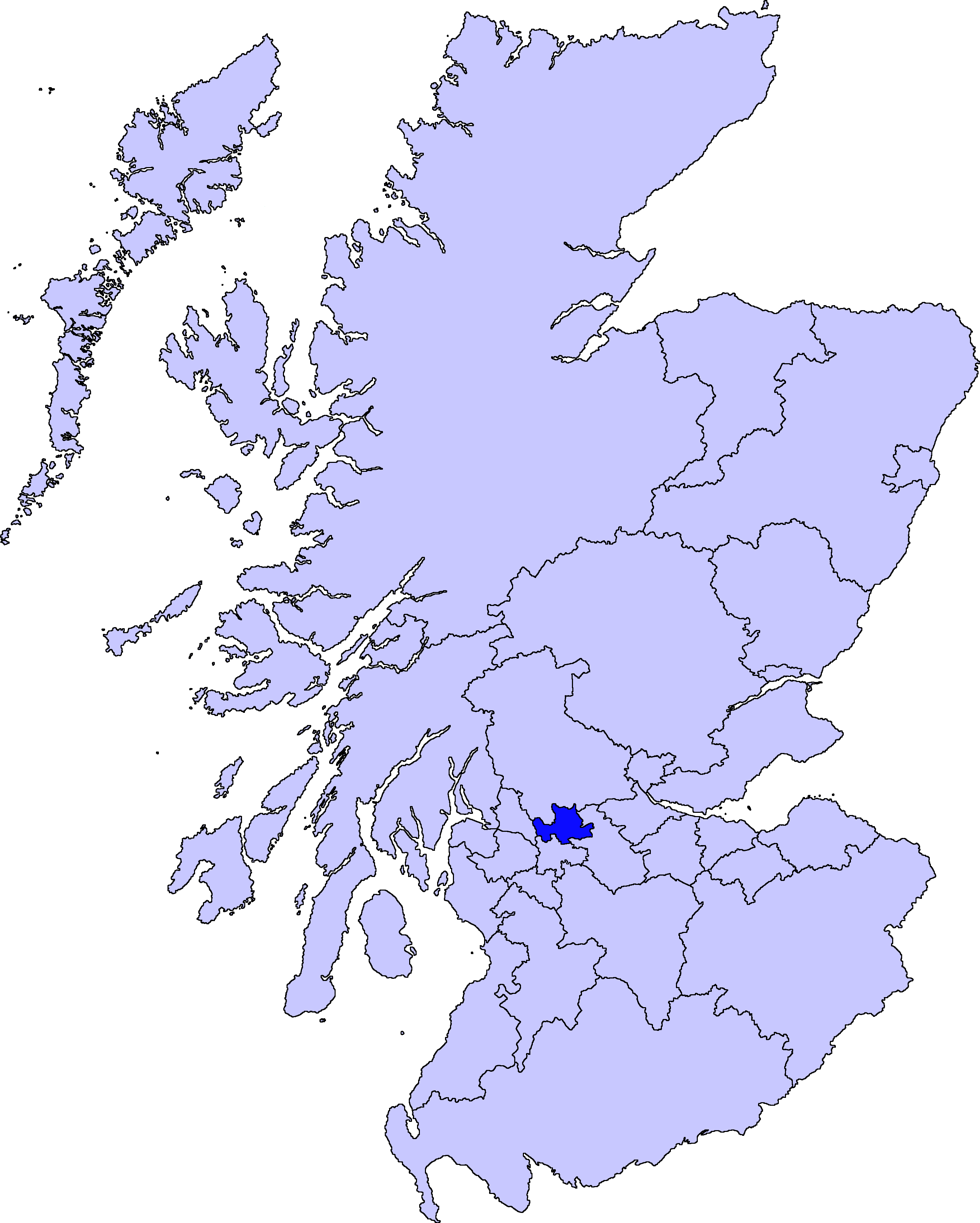
East Dunbartonshire shown within Scotland

This is a list of Category A listed buildings in East Dunbartonshire, Scotland.

In Scotland, the term listed building refers to a building or other structure officially designated as being of "special architectural or historic interest". Category A structures are those considered to be "buildings of national or international importance, either architectural or historic, or fine little-altered examples of some particular period, style or building type." Listing was begun by a provision in the Town and Country Planning (Scotland) Act 1947, and the current legislative basis for listing is the Planning (Listed Buildings and Conservation Areas) (Scotland) Act 1997. The authority for listing rests with Historic Scotland, an executive agency of the Scottish Government, which inherited this role from the Scottish Development Department in 1991. Once listed, severe restrictions are imposed on the modifications allowed to a building's structure or its fittings. Listed building consent must be obtained from local authorities prior to any alteration to such a structure. There are approximately 47,400 listed buildings in Scotland, of which around 8% (some 3,800) are Category A.

The council area of East Dunbartonshire covers 175 square kilometres (68 sq mi), and has a population of around 104,700. There are 15 Category A listed buildings in the area. These include several works by the Glasgow-based architect David Hamilton, including the now-derelict Lennox Castle, and two late villas by Alexander Thomson. There are several Category A listed churches and country houses, with the oldest being Bardowie Castle, which dates partly to the 16th century.

== Listed buildings ==
Name	Location	Date listed	Geo-coordinates	Notes	LB number	Image
High Church of Campsie	Main Street, Lennoxtown	5 September 1973	55°58′32″N 4°11′59″W	19th-century church by David Hamilton	4353	Upload another image See more images
Lennox Castle	Lennoxtown	5 September 1973	55°58′39″N 4°14′09″W	19th-century country house by David Hamilton, later a hospital and now derelict	4354	Upload another image See more images
Kincaid House	Milton of Campsie	5 September 1973	55°57′29″N 4°09′51″W	17th-century country house, rebuilt in the 19th century by David Hamilton	4357	Upload Photo
27 Victoria Road	Lenzie	17 August 1977	55°55′04″N 4°09′14″W	19th-century villa by Alexander Thomson	4407	Upload Photo
Warwick Croft and 43 Alexandra Road	Heriot Road, Lenzie	17 August 1977	55°55′03″N 4°09′21″W	Pair of 19th-century villas by Alexander Thomson	4408	Upload another image
Bardowie Castle	Bardowie	5 September 1973	55°56′08″N 4°16′40″W	16th-century tower with later additions, still occupied	5726	Upload another image See more images
Mugdock Reservoir and Craigmaddie Reservoir	New Kilpatrick	14 May 1971			18227	Upload another image See more images
New Kilpatrick Parish Church	Kirk Road, Bearsden	14 May 1971	55°55′17″N 4°19′58″W	Early 19th-century church	22130	Upload another image See more images
Kilmardinny House	Bearsden	14 May 1971	55°55′33″N 4°19′19″W	Mid-19th-century country house, now Bearsden Arts Centre	22135	Upload another image
Cawder House	Cadder, Bishopbriggs	12 January 1971	55°55′37″N 4°13′58″W	17th-century country house, remodelled by David Hamilton	22272	Upload another image
Old Parish Church of St. Mary	Cowgate, Kirkintilloch	14 May 1971	55°56′27″N 4°09′34″W	17th-century church, now a museum	36645	Upload another image See more images
Auld Aisle Cemetery	Old Aisle Road, Oxgangs, Kirkintilloch	14 May 1971	55°55′57″N 4°08′18″W	Former churchyard, including 18th-century watch-house	36646	Upload another image See more images
Luggie Water Aqueduct and Bridge	Barleybank, Kirkintilloch	29 April 1986	55°56′23″N 4°09′04″W	18th century aqueduct by John Smeaton, carrying the Forth and Clyde Canal over a road and the Luggie Water	36655	Upload another image See more images
Factor's House, Dougalston	Dougalston, Milngavie	14 May 1971	55°56′12″N 4°17′41″W	18th-century house	37847	Upload Photo
Glenshira, 27 Boclair Road	Bearsden	25 April 2002	55°55′15″N 4°18′51″W	Arts and Crafts house of 1926	48593	Upload Photo

== See also ==
- Scheduled monuments in East Dunbartonshire
