= List of listed buildings in East Dunbartonshire =

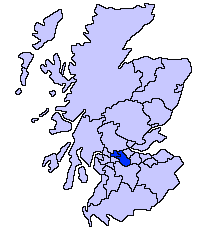
East Dunbartonshire shown within Scotland

This is a list of listed buildings in East Dunbartonshire. The list is split out by parish.

- List of listed buildings in Baldernock, East Dunbartonshire
- List of listed buildings in Bearsden, East Dunbartonshire
- List of listed buildings in Bishopbriggs, East Dunbartonshire
- List of listed buildings in Cadder, East Dunbartonshire
- List of listed buildings in Campsie, East Dunbartonshire
- List of listed buildings in Kirkintilloch, East Dunbartonshire
- List of listed buildings in Milngavie, East Dunbartonshire
- List of listed buildings in New Kilpatrick, East Dunbartonshire

== See also ==
- Scheduled monuments in East Dunbartonshire
