= Jenny Hyslop =

- Born: Janet Kerr Reid; 13 July 1898; Gorbals
- Died: 13 September 1989 (aged 91); Canniesburn Hospital
- Occupation: community leader

Jenny Kerr Hyslop born Janet Kerr Reid (13 July 1898 – 13 September 1989) was a Scottish community leader, co-operative worker and disability activist.

== Early life ==
Hyslop was born in the Gorbals area of Glasgow in 1898. She was the last of three children born to Mary Kerr Hyslop and Thomas Reid. One of her first jobs was delivering milk as her family owned two shops on the south side of Glasgow. In 1921 she married and moved to Clydebank.

== Career ==
=== Rent strike ===
When she arrived in Clydebank their neighbours were involved in a rent strike. There was a history of rent strikes and they had led in 1915 to the Rents and Mortgage Interest Restriction Act. Now in 1921, there was a new set of laws and Hyslop was asked to pay her rent but to refuse to pay any increases. She took a lead in the rent strike. When people came to enforce and evict tenants they would ring bells to make everyone aware.

=== Second World War ===
She was a member of the Women's Co-operative Guild and she helped manage the Clydebank Co-operative Society. During the Second World War she became an ARP Warden and she was one of few women promoted to be section heads. On 13 and 14 March 1941 the Clydebank Blitz took place and her house was destroyed. Of the 12,000 houses in Clydebank only eight were undamaged. Hyslop was working through this when 35,000 people lost their place to live. Her ARP headquarters at Radnor Park Church Hall took in 60 casualties after the nearby first aid post caught fire. There was no doctor, but a team of final year medical students arrived from Glasgow's Western Infirmary.

=== Disability rights activism ===
In 1955 she became the first secretary of the Voluntary Association for Handicapped Persons after many years of campaigning and the Government's advisory Disablement Advisory Committee. She was annoyed that schools for disabled people only took those who were deemed teachable. One of her children had a disability and she was annoyed that disabled children were not seen in a normal community. Her organisation used its 170 members to found a new home on the Drumry Road in Clydebank which opened in 1978.

== Personal life ==
In 1978 she was awarded Scotswoman of the Year by the Evening Times newspaper. Hyslop died in Glasgow's Canniesburn Hospital in 1989.
