= List of listed buildings in Bearsden =

This is a list of listed buildings in the parish of Bearsden in East Dunbartonshire, Scotland.

== List ==
Name	Location	Date Listed	Grid Ref. (Note: Sometimes known as OSGB36, the grid reference (where provided) is based on the British national grid reference system used by the Ordnance Survey. • "Guide to National Grid". Ordnance Survey. • "Get-a-map". Ordnance Survey.)	Geo-coordinates	Notes	LB Number (Note: Historic Environment Scotland assign a unique alphanumeric identifier to each designated site in Scotland, for listed buildings this always begins with "LB", for example "LB12345".)	Image
Duntocher Road, St Andrew's College, Eyre Hall, Consuela Hall, Ogilvie House, Lescher Hall And Julie Billiart Hall				55°55′45″N 4°20′39″W	Category A	44962	Upload Photo
Westerton, 1-15 (Odd Nos) Northview				55°54′27″N 4°20′15″W	Category C(S)	22161	Upload Photo
Westerton 17-31 (Odd Nos) Northview				55°54′27″N 4°20′19″W	Category C(S)	22162	Upload Photo
Westerton, 2 -16 (Even Numbers) Northview				55°54′28″N 4°20′15″W	Category C(S)	22163	Upload Photo
Westerton, 6, 8 Stirling Avenue				55°54′24″N 4°20′09″W	Category C(S)	22165	Upload Photo
Westerton, 10, 12 Stirling Avenue				55°54′25″N 4°20′08″W	Category C(S)	22166	Upload Photo
Carse View Drive, 8				55°55′37″N 4°19′08″W	Category C(S)	22141	Upload Photo
Westerton, 25-39 (Odd Nos) Maxwell Avenue				55°54′29″N 4°20′11″W	Category B	22151	Upload Photo
Westerton, 51-65 (Odd Nos) Maxwell Avenue				55°54′27″N 4°20′11″W	Category B	22153	Upload Photo
Westerton, 67-71 (Odd Nos) Maxwell Avenue				55°54′25″N 4°20′11″W	Category B	22154	Upload Photo
Westerton, 73-79 (Odd Nos) Maxwell Avenue				55°54′23″N 4°20′09″W	Category C(S)	22155	Upload Photo
Westerton, 46-56 (Even Nos) Maxwell Avenue				55°54′27″N 4°20′13″W	Category C(S)	22159	Upload Photo
18 Boclair Road, Romanhurst, Including Boundary Walls, Gatepiers And Gates				55°55′11″N 4°18′53″W	Category C(S)	46094	Upload Photo
19 Boclair Road				55°55′13″N 4°18′58″W	Category C(S)	48592	Upload Photo
Westerton, 14, 16 Stirling Avenue				55°54′26″N 4°20′07″W	Category C(S)	22167	Upload Photo
Carse View Drive, 7				55°55′36″N 4°19′07″W	Category C(S)	22140	Upload Photo
Westerton, 41-49 (Odd Nos) Maxwell Avenue				55°54′28″N 4°20′11″W	Category C(S)	22152	Upload Photo
Westerton, 101-107 (Odd Nos) Maxwell Avenue				55°54′19″N 4°20′06″W	Category C(S)	22158	Upload Photo
25 Macfarlane Road, The Waterboard House, Including Boundary Wall, Gatepiers And Gates				55°54′46″N 4°19′16″W	Category C(S)	46095	Upload Photo
Bearsden, Kilmardinny Crescent, White Lodge				55°55′35″N 4°19′16″W	Category B	48081	Upload Photo
27 Boclair Road Including Ancillary Building, Terrace Walls And Gatepiers				55°55′15″N 4°18′51″W	Category A	48593	Upload Photo
Bearsden Cross, 102-116 (Even Nos) Drymen Road, 2-22 (Even Nos) New Kirk Road And 1-11 (Odd Nos) Roman Road				55°55′11″N 4°20′00″W	Category C(S)	48594	Upload Photo
Kilmardinny Avenue, Kilmardinny Lodge Including Boundary Walls And Piers				55°55′39″N 4°18′56″W	Category C(S)	48600	Upload Photo
Boclair Road, New Kilpatrick Cemetery, Including Gatepiers, Gates, Boundary Wall And Pathways				55°55′17″N 4°18′41″W	Category B	50221	Upload another image See more images
Westerton 2, 4 Stirling Avenue				55°54′24″N 4°20′09″W	Category C(S)	22164	Upload Photo
Camstradden Drive East, Pinehurst With Terrace Walls				55°54′57″N 4°20′44″W	Category B	22168	Upload Photo
Carse View Drive, 5 Glen Haven				55°55′37″N 4°19′03″W	Category B	22138	Upload Photo
West End Square Maryhill Road				55°54′30″N 4°19′10″W	Category B	22148	Upload Photo
36 And 38 Roman Road, Registrar's Office				55°55′07″N 4°19′22″W	Category C(S)	46096	Upload Photo
100 Milngavie Road, Bearsden Council Chambers				55°55′05″N 4°19′14″W	Category B	43521	Upload Photo
Westerton, 58-64 (Even Nos) Maxwell Avenue				55°54′26″N 4°20′13″W	Category C(S)	22160	Upload Photo
Carse View Drive, 2 Overdale				55°55′37″N 4°18′58″W	Category C(S)	22137	Upload Photo
Westerton, 89-99 (Odd Nos) Maxwell Avenue				55°54′20″N 4°20′07″W	Category C(S)	22157	Upload Photo
Drymen Road, Bearsden North (Church Of Scotland) Church Including Church Hall And Gatepiers				55°55′11″N 4°20′04″W	Category B	48595	Upload Photo
Drymen Road, War Memorial				55°55′10″N 4°20′00″W	Category B	48596	Upload Photo
Mcfarlane Road, Milepost				55°54′51″N 4°19′13″W	Category C(S)	48601	Upload Photo
Bearsden, 44 Pendicle Road Including Boundary Wall And Gatepiers				55°54′45″N 4°20′23″W	Category C(S)	49617	Upload Photo
Carse View Drive, 6				55°55′37″N 4°19′05″W	Category C(S)	22139	Upload Photo
Carse View Drive, 9 Highhowe				55°55′38″N 4°19′08″W	Category B	22142	Upload Photo
Lochend Farm, 21 Lochend Road				55°54′49″N 4°20′11″W	Category B	22144	Upload Photo
Drymen Road, Mileposts				55°55′33″N 4°20′30″W	Category C(S)	48597	Upload Photo
Milngavie Road, Milepost				55°55′39″N 4°18′55″W	Category C(S)	48603	Upload Photo
Killermont House				55°54′30″N 4°18′08″W	Category B	22131	Upload Photo
Kilmardinny House				55°55′33″N 4°19′19″W	Category A	22135	Upload another image
Carse View Drive, 1				55°55′37″N 4°18′57″W	Category C(S)	22136	Upload Photo
Lower Kilmardinny House, Milngavie Road				55°55′36″N 4°18′51″W	Category B	22145	Upload Photo
Westerton, 81-87 (Odd Nos), Maxwell Avenue				55°54′21″N 4°20′09″W	Category C(S)	22156	Upload Photo
6 Kilmardinny Crescent, Green Ridge Including Terrace Walls, Boundary Walls And Gatepiers				55°55′28″N 4°19′24″W	Category B	48599	Upload Photo
Garscube Mill				55°54′26″N 4°18′55″W	Category B	22133	Upload Photo
Shaw Hospital Drymen Road				55°55′34″N 4°20′18″W	Category B	22134	Upload Photo
Carse View Drive, 10				55°55′38″N 4°19′07″W	Category B	22143	Upload Photo
Drymen Road, 22 Carrick Arden				55°54′46″N 4°19′27″W	Category B	22146	Upload Photo
24 Boclair Crescent, Blaven Including Garden Walls And Gatepiers				55°55′08″N 4°18′55″W	Category B	22150	Upload Photo
6 Roman Road Including Boundary Walls, Gatepiers And Gates				55°55′09″N 4°19′55″W	Category B	48604	Upload Photo
2 Chesters Road, Scotus College Including Archway And Former Stable Block, Boundary Wall And Gatepiers				55°55′06″N 4°20′44″W	Category C(S)	50878	Upload Photo
9 Ralston Road				55°55′25″N 4°20′01″W	Category B	43907	Upload Photo
New Kilpatrick Parish Church, Bearsden				55°55′17″N 4°19′58″W	Category A	22130	Upload Photo
Bridge In Garscube Park				55°54′16″N 4°19′03″W	Category B	22132	Upload Photo
Milngavie Road, 156 Bournemouth				55°55′19″N 4°19′07″W	Category C(S)	22147	Upload Photo
Canniesburn Square, Bearsden				55°54′34″N 4°19′26″W	Category C(S)	22149	Upload Photo
8A Camstradden Drive East Including Terrace Walls And Gatepiers				55°54′55″N 4°20′51″W	Category B	48598	Upload Photo
Mcfarlane Road, Horse Trough				55°54′42″N 4°19′20″W	Category C(S)	48602	Upload Photo

== Key ==
The scheme for classifying buildings in Scotland is:

- Category A: "buildings of national or international importance, either architectural or historic; or fine, little-altered examples of some particular period, style or building type."
- Category B: "buildings of regional or more than local importance; or major examples of some particular period, style or building type, which may have been altered."
- Category C: "buildings of local importance; lesser examples of any period, style, or building type, as originally constructed or moderately altered; and simple traditional buildings which group well with other listed buildings."

In March 2016 there were 47,288 listed buildings in Scotland. Of these, 8% were Category A, and 50% were Category B, with the remaining 42% being Category C.

== See also ==
- List of listed buildings in East Dunbartonshire
