= List of listed buildings in New Kilpatrick =

This is a list of listed buildings in the parish of New Kilpatrick in East Dunbartonshire, Scotland.

== List ==
Name	Location	Date Listed	Grid Ref. (Note: Sometimes known as OSGB36, the grid reference (where provided) is based on the British national grid reference system used by the Ordnance Survey. • "Guide to National Grid". Ordnance Survey. • "Get-a-map". Ordnance Survey.)	Geo-coordinates	Notes	LB Number (Note: Historic Environment Scotland assign a unique alphanumeric identifier to each designated site in Scotland, for listed buildings this always begins with "LB", for example "LB12345".)	Image
Switchback Road, Canniesburn Hospital, Original Hospital Blocks, Lodge And Pair Houseblocks				55°54′38″N 4°19′50″W	Category B	19256	Upload Photo
Crossburn				55°56′36″N 4°20′59″W	Category B	14396	Upload Photo
Mugdock Reservoir, Barrachan With Ancillary Structures (Former Glasgow Corporation Water Works)				55°57′18″N 4°18′24″W	Category C(S)	51266	Upload Photo
Mugdock Reservoir, Mugdock Cottage (Former Glasgow Corporation Water Works)				55°57′03″N 4°18′36″W	Category C(S)	51275	Upload Photo
Mugdock Reservoir And Craigmaddie Reservoir Including Straining Wells, James Gale Memorial And Boundary Walls (Former Glasgow Corporation Water Works)				55°57′03″N 4°18′05″W	Category A	18227	Upload another image
Mugdock Reservoir, Craigholm (Former Glasgow Corporation Water Works)				55°57′26″N 4°18′47″W	Category C(S)	51274	Upload Photo

== Key ==
The scheme for classifying buildings in Scotland is:

- Category A: "buildings of national or international importance, either architectural or historic; or fine, little-altered examples of some particular period, style or building type."
- Category B: "buildings of regional or more than local importance; or major examples of some particular period, style or building type, which may have been altered."
- Category C: "buildings of local importance; lesser examples of any period, style, or building type, as originally constructed or moderately altered; and simple traditional buildings which group well with other listed buildings."

In March 2016 there were 47,288 listed buildings in Scotland. Of these, 8% were Category A, and 50% were Category B, with the remaining 42% being Category C.

== See also ==
- List of listed buildings in East Dunbartonshire
