= List of listed buildings in Cadder =

This is a list of listed buildings in the parish of Cadder in East Dunbartonshire, Scotland.

== List ==
| Name | Location | Date Listed | Grid Ref. (Note: Sometimes known as OSGB36, the grid reference (where provided) is based on the British national grid reference system used by the Ordnance Survey. • "Guide to National Grid". Ordnance Survey. • "Get-a-map". Ordnance Survey.) | Geo-coordinates | Notes | LB Number (Note: Historic Environment Scotland assign a unique alphanumeric identifier to each designated site in Scotland, for listed buildings this always begins with "LB", for example "LB12345".) | Image |
|---|---|---|---|---|---|---|---|
| Kirkintilloch Road, Lenzie The Tower | | | | 55°55′21″N 4°09′15″W | Category C(S) | 4401 | Upload Photo |
| Victoria Road, Lenzie No 21 | | | | 55°55′07″N 4°09′16″W | Category B | 4404 | Upload Photo |
| Victoria Road, Lenzie, No 31 Craigievar | | | | 55°55′03″N 4°09′13″W | Category B | 4409 | Upload Photo |
| Victoria Road, Lenzie Nos 50 And 52 | | | | 55°54′58″N 4°09′14″W | Category B | 161 | Upload Photo |
| Victoria Road, Lenzie No 3 | | | | 55°55′13″N 4°09′19″W | Category C(S) | 4403 | Upload Photo |
| Victoria Road, Lenzie Nos 34 And 36 | | | | 55°55′05″N 4°09′18″W | Category B | 4405 | Upload Photo |
| 14 And 16 Glenbank Road, Lenzie | | | | 55°55′08″N 4°09′12″W | Category C(S) | 4394 | Upload Photo |
| Heriot Road, Lenzie Warwick Croft And No 43 Alexandra Road | | | | 55°55′03″N 4°09′21″W | Category A | 4408 | Upload another image |
| Victoria Road, Lenzie No 39 | | | | 55°55′02″N 4°09′12″W | Category C(S) | 4410 | Upload Photo |
| Beech Road, 9, 11 Netherhall Gatepiers And Gates | | | | 55°55′36″N 4°09′26″W | Category B | 4399 | Upload Photo |
| Kirkintilloch Road, 65 Lenzie | | | | 55°55′26″N 4°09′20″W | Category C(S) | 4402 | Upload Photo |
| Victoria Road, Lenzie No 28 And No 16 Glenhead Road | | | | 55°55′05″N 4°09′15″W | Category B | 4406 | Upload Photo |
| Cadder Yard, Mile Post | | | | 55°54′53″N 4°11′03″W | Category C(S) | 44587 | Upload Photo |
| Lenzie Old Parish Church, Kirkintilloch Road | | | | 55°55′20″N 4°09′13″W | Category C(S) | 4400 | Upload Photo |
| Victoria Road, Lenzie No. 27 | | | | 55°55′04″N 4°09′14″W | Category A | 4407 | Upload Photo |
| Lenzie, Beech Road St Cyprian's Episcopal Church & Lych Gate | | | | 55°55′41″N 4°09′24″W | Category B | 4395 | Upload another image |

== Key ==
The scheme for classifying buildings in Scotland is:

- Category A: "buildings of national or international importance, either architectural or historic; or fine, little-altered examples of some particular period, style or building type."
- Category B: "buildings of regional or more than local importance; or major examples of some particular period, style or building type, which may have been altered."
- Category C: "buildings of local importance; lesser examples of any period, style, or building type, as originally constructed or moderately altered; and simple traditional buildings which group well with other listed buildings."

In March 2016 there were 47,288 listed buildings in Scotland. Of these, 8% were Category A, and 50% were Category B, with the remaining 42% being Category C.

== See also ==
- List of listed buildings in East Dunbartonshire
