= List of listed buildings in Bishopbriggs =

This is a list of listed buildings in the parish of Bishopbriggs in East Dunbartonshire, Scotland.

== List ==
Name	Location	Date listed	Grid ref. (Note: Sometimes known as OSGB36, the grid reference (where provided) is based on the British national grid reference system used by the Ordnance Survey. • "Guide to National Grid". Ordnance Survey. • "Get-a-map". Ordnance Survey.)	Geo-coordinates	Notes	LB number (Note: Historic Environment Scotland assign a unique alphanumeric identifier to each designated site in Scotland, for listed buildings this always begins with "LB", for example "LB12345".)	Image
Cawder Estate, Cawder House				55°55′37″N 4°13′58″W	Category A	22272	Upload another image
Cawder Estate, Cawder House, Bridge Over Bishopbriggs Burn				55°55′35″N 4°13′31″W	Category C(S)	22275	Upload Photo
Cadder Road, Cawdermill House				55°55′22″N 4°13′00″W	Category C(S)	22279	Upload Photo
Cadder Road, Cadder No 21 (Kirklea) And Adjoining School Rooms				55°55′19″N 4°12′53″W	Category B	22280	Upload Photo
Cawder Estate, Cawder House Stables Including Boundary Walls And Gatepiers				55°55′34″N 4°13′53″W	Category B	22276	Upload Photo
Kirkintilloch Road, St Matthew's Roman Catholic Church				55°54′22″N 4°13′26″W	Category C(S)	22287	Upload Photo
Cawder Estate, Cawder House, Icehouse				55°55′41″N 4°14′07″W	Category B	22274	Upload Photo
Cadder Bridge Cottages				55°55′22″N 4°12′55″W	Category B	22278	Upload Photo
Huntershill House				55°53′58″N 4°13′31″W	Category B	22281	Upload Photo
Gateway At Drive Entrance				55°53′57″N 4°13′34″W	Category B	22282	Upload Photo
Kirkintilloch Road, Strathkelvin District Library Headquarters, Formerly Bishopbriggs High School				55°54′22″N 4°13′24″W	Category B	22286	Upload another image See more images
Cadder Road, Cadder Parish Church, Including Church Yard, Watch-House And Boundary Walls				55°55′26″N 4°13′01″W	Category B	22271	Upload another image See more images
Cawder Estate, Cawder House, Dovecote				55°55′34″N 4°13′47″W	Category B	22273	Upload Photo
Cawder Estate, Cawder House Gatelodge				55°55′26″N 4°13′08″W	Category C(S)	22277	Upload Photo
118, 120 Kirkintilloch Road The Crow Tavern				55°54′13″N 4°13′33″W	Category C(S)	22285	Upload another image See more images
2 Cadder Road				55°55′15″N 4°12′42″W	Category C(S)	50015	Upload Photo
Easter Cadder, Forth And Clyde Canal, Glasgow Bridge Stables Including Boundary Wall To Canal Towpath				55°55′52″N 4°11′15″W	Category B	22284	Upload Photo

== Key ==
The scheme for classifying buildings in Scotland is:

- Category A: "buildings of national or international importance, either architectural or historic; or fine, little-altered examples of some particular period, style or building type."
- Category B: "buildings of regional or more than local importance; or major examples of some particular period, style or building type, which may have been altered."
- Category C: "buildings of local importance; lesser examples of any period, style, or building type, as originally constructed or moderately altered; and simple traditional buildings which group well with other listed buildings."

In March 2016 there were 47,288 listed buildings in Scotland. Of these, 8% were Category A, and 50% were Category B, with the remaining 42% being Category C.

== See also ==
- List of listed buildings in East Dunbartonshire
