= George James Miller =

Scottish architect (1902–1940)

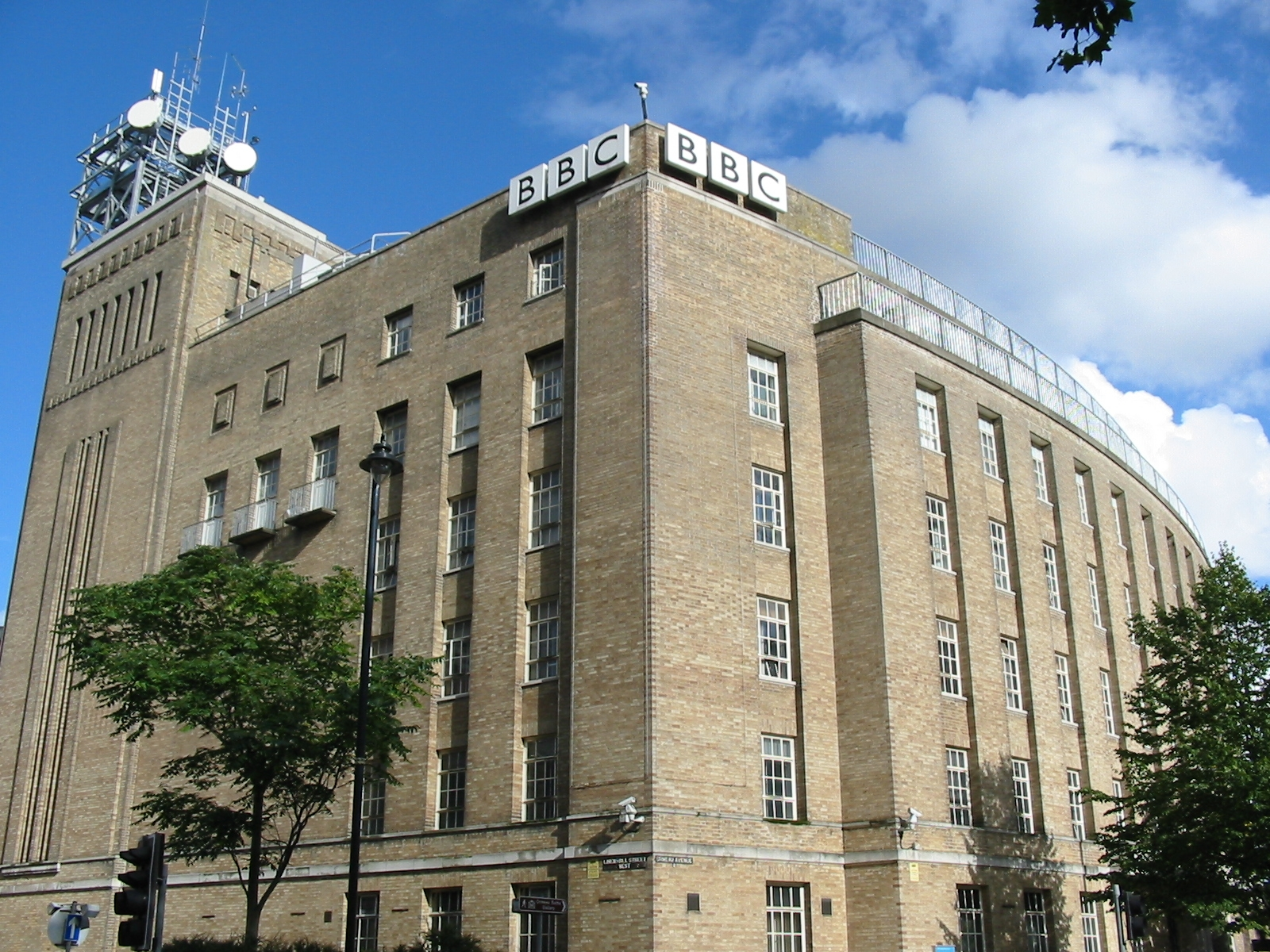
BBC Broadcasting House, Belfast

George James Miller (1902–1940) was a Scottish architect, specialising in hospitals.

== Life ==
He was born in Glasgow in 1902–03, the only son of Glasgow architect James Miller and his wife Emelina Henrietta Crichton.

Miller was sent to boarding school in Edinburgh, being educated at Fettes College. He then studied art and architecture at St John's College, Cambridge. Returning to Glasgow, he was apprenticed in his father's office and studied at the Royal Technical College of Glasgow. Around 1932 he obtained a position in Sir Herbert Baker's office for experience. Around 1936 he returned to Glasgow and joined his father's practice; the practice then became James Miller & Son.

He died on 14 May 1940 after a brief illness, at which point his father wound up the practice. He was buried in Hillfoot Cemetery in Bearsden, Glasgow.

== Family ==
He was married to Margaret Isobel Kincaid, daughter of James S Kincaid.

== Main projects ==
- Housing in Craigleith, Edinburgh (1930)
- St Nicholas Church, Cardonald (1935)
- BBC Broadcasting House, Belfast (1936)
- Canniesburn Hospital and Convalescent Home (1936)
- 30 Old Kirk Road, Corstorphine, Edinburgh (1936)
- Four houses, East Craigs, Edinburgh (1936)
- Factory and offices for Michael Nairn & Co (linoleum) in Kirkcaldy (1936)
- Balnagarrow, villa in Cramond (1937)
- Nurses Home for Glasgow Royal Infirmary (1937)
- Ear, Nose and Throat Hospital in Greenock (1937)
- SMT bus garage in Glasgow (1937)
- Remodelling of the Locarno ballroom on Sauchiehall Street (1937)
- Almond Lodge, Edinburgh (1938)
- Gilbert Bain Hospital, Lerwick (1938)
- Numerous works in the 1938 Empire Exhibition, most notably the South Africa Pavilion (1938)
- Shanks & Co, toiletware showroom and offices 189 West George Street (1938)
- Millers Timber Truss Co Ltd, 7 Calderwood Road (1939)
- Killearn Emergency Hospital (War Hospital) (1939)
- Conversion of Gleneagles Hotel into an Emergency War Hospital (1939)
