= List of listed buildings in Milngavie =

This is a list of listed buildings in the former burgh of Milngavie in East Dunbartonshire, Scotland. Although burghs were abolished for administrative purposes in 1975, Historic Scotland continue to use them and civil parishes for the purposes of geographically categorising listed buildings.

== List ==
Name	Location	Date Listed	Grid Ref. (Note: Sometimes known as OSGB36, the grid reference (where provided) is based on the British national grid reference system used by the Ordnance Survey. • "Guide to National Grid". Ordnance Survey. • "Get-a-map". Ordnance Survey.)	Geo-coordinates	Notes	LB Number (Note: Historic Environment Scotland assign a unique alphanumeric identifier to each designated site in Scotland, for listed buildings this always begins with "LB", for example "LB12345".)	Image
James Watt Building, Cloberfield				55°56′59″N 4°19′30″W	Category B	37855	Upload Photo
Sinclair Street, Edward Viii Post Box				55°56′41″N 4°19′05″W	Category C(S)	48607	Upload Photo
Glasgow Road, Milepost				55°56′28″N 4°18′41″W	Category C(S)	48608	Upload Photo
Corbie-Ha, Ashfield Road				55°56′22″N 4°19′08″W	Category B	37845	Upload Photo
Old Castle Mains				55°56′20″N 4°20′26″W	Category B	37851	Upload Photo
Craigallian Lodge, Mugdock Road				55°57′00″N 4°18′59″W	Category C(S)	37853	Upload another image
St Pauls Church Milngavie				55°56′32″N 4°18′39″W	Category C(S)	37848	Upload another image See more images
133 Mugdock Road, Woodlands Including Ancillary Buildings, Boundary Walls, Gatepiers And Gates				55°56′52″N 4°19′06″W	Category B	48606	Upload Photo
The Black Bull Hotel				55°56′27″N 4°19′04″W	Category C(S)	37849	Upload Photo
Clober Farm, Graigton Road				55°56′49″N 4°20′03″W	Category C(S)	37854	Upload Photo
1 St Edmunds Grove, Including Terrace Walls And Gatepiers				55°56′58″N 4°19′13″W	Category C(S)	48605	Upload Photo
Cairns Church, Buchanan Street				55°56′40″N 4°18′49″W	Category B	37856	Upload another image
Gavins Mill, Gavins Mill Road				55°56′22″N 4°19′01″W	Category B	37844	Upload Photo
Dovecot, Dougalston				55°56′32″N 4°18′11″W	Category B	37846	Upload another image See more images
Factor's House, Dougalston				55°56′12″N 4°17′41″W	Category A	37847	Upload Photo
Barloch House Barloch Avenue				55°56′43″N 4°18′53″W	Category B	37850	Upload Photo
Railway Station, Milngavie				55°56′29″N 4°18′52″W	Category B	37852	Upload another image See more images

== Key ==
The scheme for classifying buildings in Scotland is:

- Category A: "buildings of national or international importance, either architectural or historic; or fine, little-altered examples of some particular period, style or building type."
- Category B: "buildings of regional or more than local importance; or major examples of some particular period, style or building type, which may have been altered."
- Category C: "buildings of local importance; lesser examples of any period, style, or building type, as originally constructed or moderately altered; and simple traditional buildings which group well with other listed buildings."

In March 2016 there were 47,288 listed buildings in Scotland. Of these, 8% were Category A, and 50% were Category B, with the remaining 42% being Category C.

== See also ==
- List of listed buildings in East Dunbartonshire
