= Hafton House =

Category B listed house in Hunters Quay, Argyll and Bute

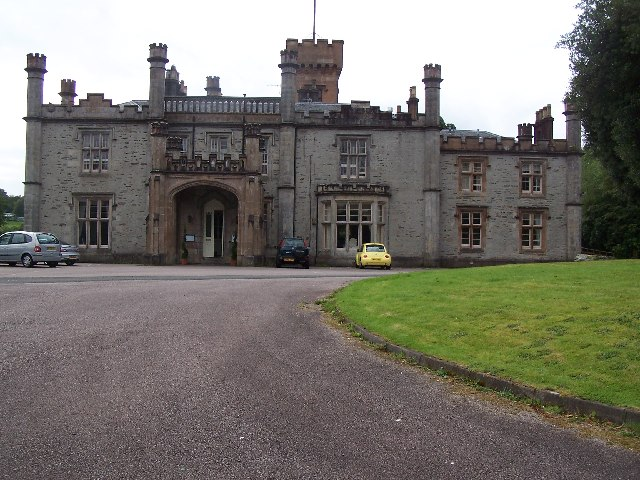
- Hafton House in 2005
- Interactive map of the Hafton House area
- Alternative names: Hafton Castle

General information
- Location: Hunters Quay, Argyll and Bute, Scotland
- Coordinates: 55.9773°N 4.9248°W
- Completed: late 18th century
- Client: James Hunter

Technical details
- Floor count: 2

Design and construction
- Architect: David Hamilton

Website
- http://www.hafton-castle.co.uk

Hafton House (also known as Hafton Castle) is a Category B listed country house in Hunters Quay, Argyll and Bute, Scotland. The property is located on the southern shores of the Holy Loch. It dates to the late 18th century, built to a design by David Hamilton, and it received its historic designation in 1971. It is two storeys, with a higher tower.

One of its first owners was James Hunter (1814–1854). As of 1841, Hunter was living at Hafton "age 25 (sic), of independent means, with his wife [Eliza] and children, Eliza age 4, James age 3 and William age 4 months, as well as other Hunter relatives and 7 female servants". At least one other child — a daughter, Rosina Jane — was born later. James Hunter Sr. was still resident there in 1851, age 37. James Hunter Jr. purchased nearby Dunloskin Farm in the 1870s.

In the 1870s, the property was 5,740 acres (2,320 ha).

The grounds also contain a gatehouse and a bridge.

== See also ==
- List of listed buildings in Argyll and Bute
