= Lennox Castle =

Castle in Scotland

Coordinates: 55.9774°N 4.2354°W

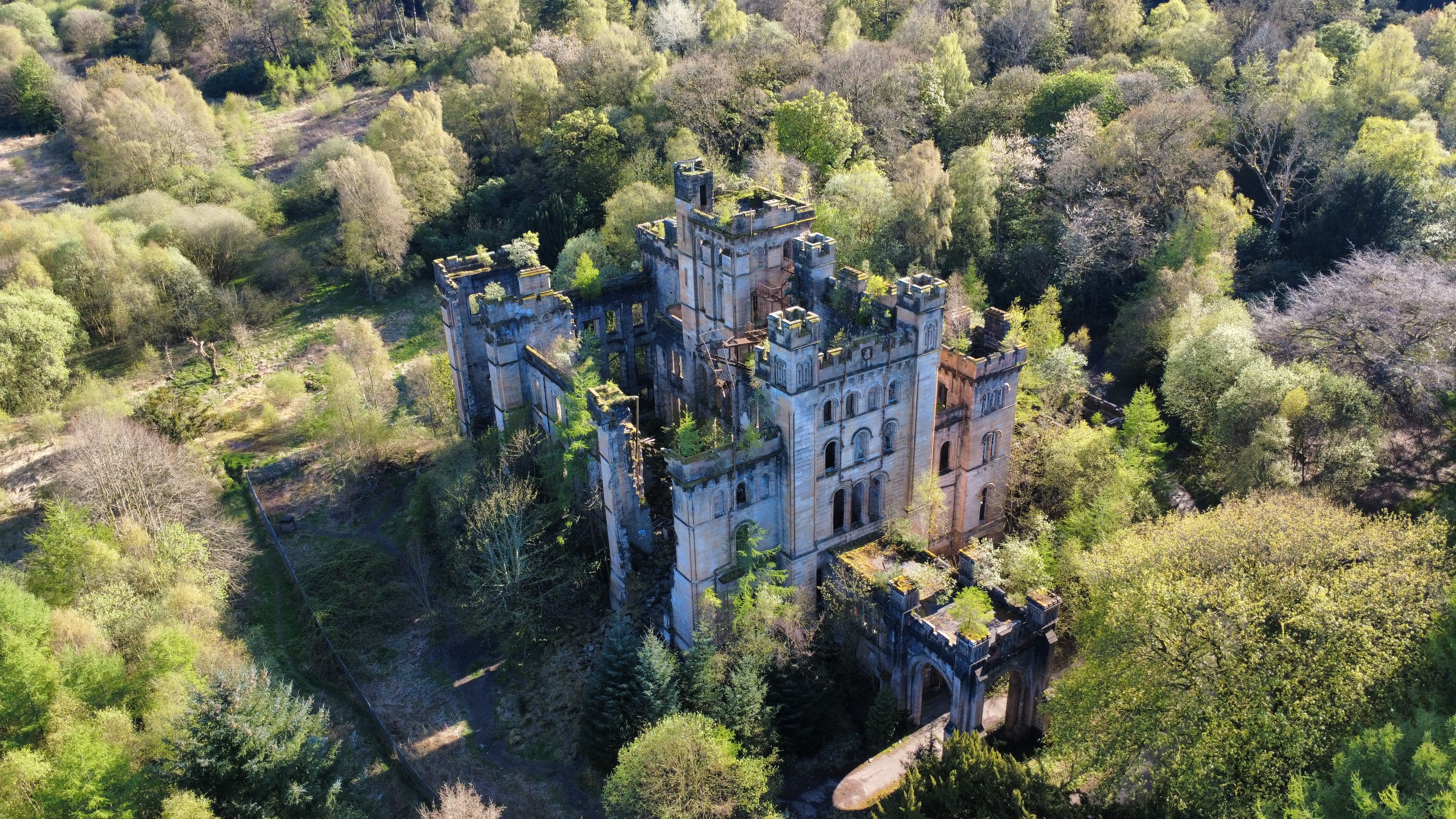
Remains of Lennox Castle as it appeared in 2025

Lennox Castle is an abandoned castle in Lennoxtown, East Dunbartonshire, Scotland, approximately 12 miles (19 kilometres) north of Glasgow. It is infamous for previously hosting Lennox Castle Hospital, Scotland's "largest institution for people with learning disabilities".

The castle was built between 1837 and 1841 by David Hamilton for John Lennox Kincaid, on the Lennox of Woodhead Estate, replacing Kincaid House. In 1927, the castle and its land was purchased by the Glasgow Corporation, and converted into a hospital for people with learning disabilities; the hospital opened in 1936. The castle itself was the nurses' home, whilst its grounds provided accommodation for about 1,200 patients. The Scotsman reports that soon afterwards, the facilities were "vastly overcrowded, understaffed and underfunded".

By 1982, 1360 patients between the ages of 10 and 80 years old were looked after by around 500 staff, with fewer than half of these being trained nurses. The Scottish Hospitals Advisory Service had visited the year before and recommended a further 100 staff. The care provided by the hospital was reported to be poor, with patients being malnourished.

There was also a separate maternity unit in operation between the 1940s and 1960s; singer Lulu and footballer John Brown were among the babies born there.

This hospital was closed in 2002, as a reflection in changes to how society treated patients with learning disabilities with a view to keeping them in the community. Further, it was noted that patients were treated poorly by staff. Its time as a hospital was the basis for Linda McLean’s award winning play Castle Lennox.

The castle itself (Category A listed since the 1970s) is in ruins following a fire in 2008. Part of the grounds of the castle were converted into Celtic F.C.'s Lennoxtown Training Centre (opened in 2007), while other parts towards Lennoxtown village have become a long-term residential development to be completed in several phases, known as Campsie View. As of 2025, only one of these phases has been completed (in 2015), although plans are underway to commence further construction by late 2026.

== See also ==
- List of Category A listed buildings in East Dunbartonshire
- List of listed buildings in Campsie, East Dunbartonshire
