= Balgray Tower =

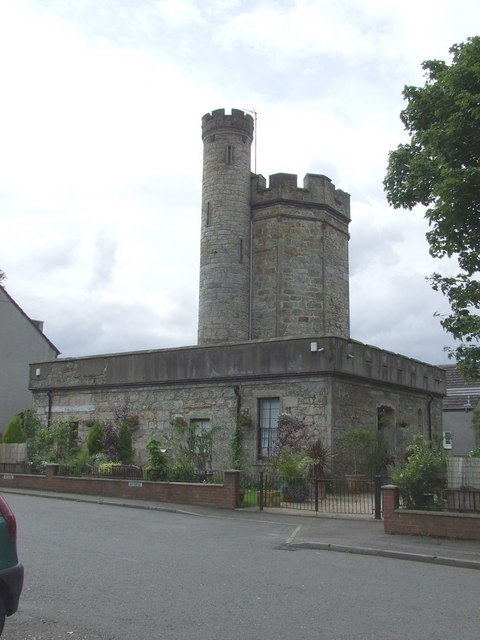
- Balgray Tower (view from Broomfield Road)

- Location within Glasgow council area
- Alternative names: Breeze’s Tower, Springburn Castle

General information
- Type: Gothic villa with castellated tower
- Architectural style: Gothic Revival
- Classification: Category B listed building
- Location: Springburn, Glasgow, Scotland
- Coordinates: 55.8872°N 4.2295°W
- Construction started: c. 1820–1830
- Client: Duncan (of Mosesfield)

Design and construction
- Architect: Style of David Hamilton
- Designations: Listing Scotland: Balgray Tower, 50 Broomfield Road, Glasgow

Balgray Tower is an early nineteenth-century Gothic villa with an attached castellated tower at 50 Broomfield Road in the Springburn district of Glasgow, Scotland. It was built c. 1820–1830 in the Picturesque Gothic Revival style and is protected as a Category B listed building for its architectural and historic interest.

== History ==
Balgray Tower was commissioned circa 1820 by industrialist Moses McCulloch of Cumberland Ironworks, one of Scotland’s early notable ironfounders. McCulloch engaged leading Glasgow architect David Hamilton (architect) to design the tower, which served both as a residence and a prominent local landmark. The building was originally set in open countryside north of Glasgow, surrounded by estates and farmland before the urban expansion of the city.

Over time the property acquired popular local names including Breeze’s Tower and Springburn Castle. The Breeze’s Tower name derives from the Breeze family, who owned the property for much of the latter nineteenth century and whose name became locally associated with the structure.

By the late twentieth century, the surrounding area had been developed with residential housing, placing Balgray Tower within a residential streetscape rather than in landscaped grounds.

== Architecture ==
Balgray Tower is a distinctive example of the Picturesque Gothic Revival villa form adapted for a domestic residence. It is constructed of rubble stone with harled finishes and ashlar dressings, characteristic of nineteenth-century Scottish Gothic vernacular. The building has a U-plan and features a prominent central tower with crenellated parapets concealing the roofs and round-headed bipartite windows with hood-moulds. Arrow slits and carved masks below the parapet add to its romantic medieval character. A circular staircase turret at the rear rises above the parapet and is topped by a small cap-house.

Internally, the tower is typically accessed by a spiral staircase that rises to panoramic viewing levels providing 360-degree views over the surrounding neighbourhood.

== Location and setting ==
Balgray Tower stands on Broomfield Road in Springburn, a district to the north of Glasgow’s city centre. Originally located in rural surroundings when first built, the tower is now embedded within a suburban context and is visible in views across the area due to its elevated position.

== Conservation ==
The building was designated a Category B listed structure on 15 December 1979 by Historic Environment Scotland. This status recognises Balgray Tower as a building of regional architectural or historic importance and provides legal protections for its preservation.

== Cultural references ==
Local stories have included folklore elements about the building, including anecdotes that the tower may be haunted, reflecting its distinctive and evocative character among nearby residents.

== See also ==
- David Hamilton (architect)
