= List of listed buildings in Baldernock =

This is a list of listed buildings in the parish of Baldernock in East Dunbartonshire, Scotland.

== List ==
Name	Location	Date Listed	Grid Ref. (Note: Sometimes known as OSGB36, the grid reference (where provided) is based on the British national grid reference system used by the Ordnance Survey. • "Guide to National Grid". Ordnance Survey. • "Get-a-map". Ordnance Survey.)	Geo-coordinates	Notes	LB Number (Note: Historic Environment Scotland assign a unique alphanumeric identifier to each designated site in Scotland, for listed buildings this always begins with "LB", for example "LB12345".)	Image
Craigmaddie House And Dovecot				55°57′37″N 4°17′09″W	Category B	5728	Upload Photo
Bardowie Castle				55°56′08″N 4°16′40″W	Category A	5726	Upload another image
Boghall, Near Bardowie				55°56′28″N 4°16′31″W	Category B	5730	Upload another image
Bardowie, Robinsfield House, Including Boundary Walls And Gatepiers				55°55′54″N 4°16′28″W	Category B	5724	Upload Photo
Baldernock Mill Cottage And Former Saw Mill				55°56′45″N 4°17′00″W	Category C(S)	5729	Upload Photo
Craigmaddie Castle				55°57′40″N 4°17′03″W	Category B	5727	Upload Photo
Boghall Lodge And Gates				55°56′28″N 4°16′28″W	Category B	5731	Upload Photo
The Jaw, Bardowie				55°56′14″N 4°16′58″W	Category B	5723	Upload Photo
Strathblane Road, North Lodge (Also Known As Craigmaddie Lodge) Including Gates, Railings And Gatepiers (Former Glasgow Corporation Water Works)				55°57′12″N 4°17′41″W	Category C(S)	51264	Upload Photo
Baldernock Parish Church (Church Of Scotland) Including Graveyard, Watch House, Gatepiers, Gates, Postbox And Boundary Wall				55°56′51″N 4°16′50″W	Category B	5725	Upload Photo

== Key ==
The scheme for classifying buildings in Scotland is:

- Category A: "buildings of national or international importance, either architectural or historic; or fine, little-altered examples of some particular period, style or building type."
- Category B: "buildings of regional or more than local importance; or major examples of some particular period, style or building type, which may have been altered."
- Category C: "buildings of local importance; lesser examples of any period, style, or building type, as originally constructed or moderately altered; and simple traditional buildings which group well with other listed buildings."

In March 2016 there were 47,288 listed buildings in Scotland. Of these, 8% were Category A, and 50% were Category B, with the remaining 42% being Category C.

== See also ==
- List of listed buildings in East Dunbartonshire
