= List of listed buildings in Campsie, East Dunbartonshire =

This is a list of listed buildings in the parish of Campsie in East Dunbartonshire, Scotland.

== List ==
Name	Location	Date Listed	Grid Ref. (Note: Sometimes known as OSGB36, the grid reference (where provided) is based on the British national grid reference system used by the Ordnance Survey. • "Guide to National Grid". Ordnance Survey. • "Get-a-map". Ordnance Survey.)	Geo-coordinates	Notes	LB Number (Note: Historic Environment Scotland assign a unique alphanumeric identifier to each designated site in Scotland, for listed buildings this always begins with "LB", for example "LB12345".)	Image
Lennox Castle				55°58′39″N 4°14′09″W	Category A	4354	Upload another image See more images
Kincaid House (Hotel)				55°57′29″N 4°09′51″W	Category A	4357	Upload Photo
Sundial In Garden				55°59′17″N 4°13′48″W	Category B	4352	Upload Photo
Lennox Family Vault And Waiting Room, Graveyard Of Old Parish Church, Clachan Of Campsie				55°59′22″N 4°13′44″W	Category B	4358	Upload Photo
Glorat				55°58′26″N 4°10′43″W	Category B	4356	Upload Photo
Craighead Library And Youth Centre (Former Primary School)				55°57′55″N 4°09′38″W	Category C(S)	49876	Upload Photo
Old Parish Church And Churchyard				55°59′22″N 4°13′46″W	Category B	4351	Upload Photo
"Roman" Bridge Dyke Farm Road Near Milton Of Campsie				55°58′24″N 4°07′29″W	Category C(S)	4360	Upload Photo
Stone Bridge Over Former Railway Near East Lodge, Lennoxtown				55°58′44″N 4°12′50″W	Category C(S)	51594	Upload Photo
High Church Of Campsie				55°58′32″N 4°11′59″W	Category A	4353	Upload another image See more images
Woodhead				55°58′41″N 4°14′06″W	Category B	4355	Upload Photo
Aldessan House, Clachan Of Campsie				55°59′21″N 4°13′44″W	Category B	4359	Upload Photo
Birdston Farm				55°57′07″N 4°09′28″W	Category B	4361	Upload Photo

== Key ==
The scheme for classifying buildings in Scotland is:

- Category A: "buildings of national or international importance, either architectural or historic; or fine, little-altered examples of some particular period, style or building type."
- Category B: "buildings of regional or more than local importance; or major examples of some particular period, style or building type, which may have been altered."
- Category C: "buildings of local importance; lesser examples of any period, style, or building type, as originally constructed or moderately altered; and simple traditional buildings which group well with other listed buildings."

In March 2016 there were 47,288 listed buildings in Scotland. Of these, 8% were Category A, and 50% were Category B, with the remaining 42% being Category C.

== See also ==
- List of listed buildings in East Dunbartonshire
