= KeyStore =

J.W. Filshill Ltd.
- Logo used since 1995

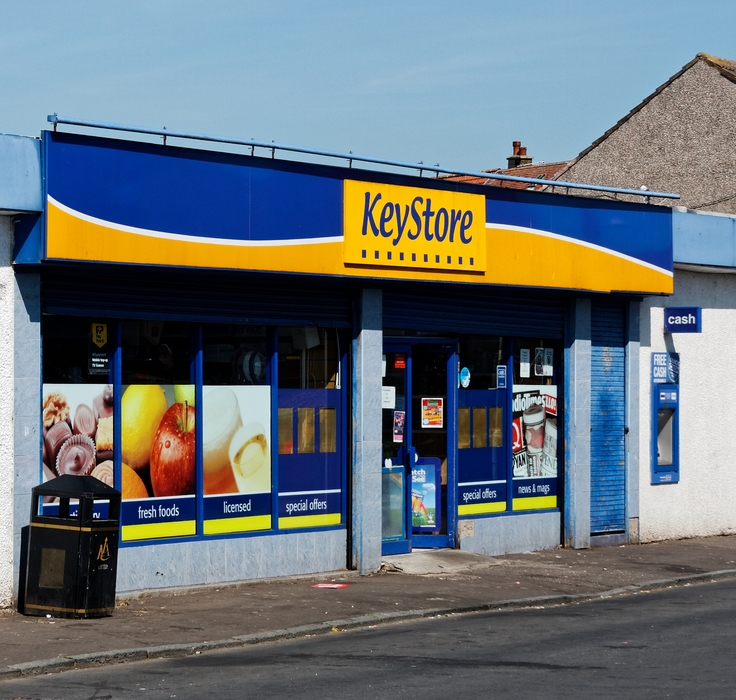
- Keystore in Kilwinning, North Ayrshire
- Trade name: KeyStore
- Industry: Convenience store symbol group
- Founded: 1995; 31 years ago
- Brands: KeyStore Express, KeyStore More
- Owner: JW Filshill Ltd.
- Website: https://www.keystore.co.uk

J.W. Filshill Ltd. (trading as KeyStore) is a Scottish convenience store symbol group. The chain predominantly trades in Scotland, but also has some stores in Northern England. As of July 2020, there are 187 stores.

== History ==
KeyStore is a symbol group owned by wholesaling group J.W. Filshill Ltd.

In early 2020, the brand launched its first store on a forecourt site.

In June 2024, the brand created a TikTok account, posting videos online showcasing new services and offers.
