= Canniesburn Hospital =

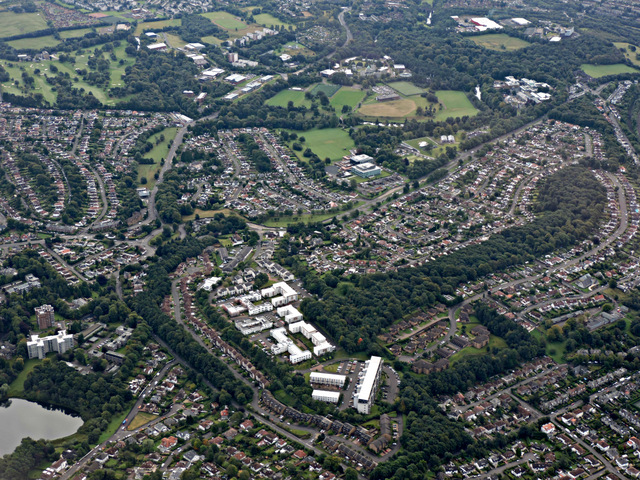
- The distinctively white buildings of Canniesburn Hospital

- Shown in East Dunbartonshire

Geography
- Location: Switchback Road, Bearsden, Scotland
- Coordinates: 55.9103°N 4.3317°W

Organisation
- Care system: NHS Scotland
- Type: General

Services
- Emergency department: No

History
- Founded: 1938
- Closed: 2003

Links
- Lists: Hospitals in Scotland

Canniesburn Hospital was a health facility on Switchback Road in Bearsden, East Dunbartonshire, Scotland. The original hospital blocks constitute a Grade B listed building.

== History ==
The facility, which was designed in 1936 by George James Miller (1902-1940) the "son" of James Miller & Son, was established as an auxiliary hospital for the Glasgow Royal Infirmary in 1938. The hospital joined the National Health Service in 1948 and a major plastic surgery unit, which quickly established an international reputation, was opened in 1968. After services transferred to the Glasgow Royal Infirmary, the hospital closed in 2003 and some of the buildings were subsequently converted by Cala Homes into apartments.

== See also ==
- List of listed buildings in New Kilpatrick
