= David Hamilton (architect) =

Scottish architect (1768–1843)

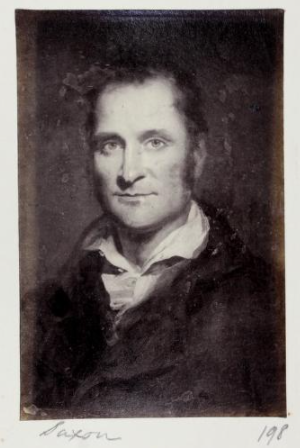
David Hamilton, Glasgow architect

David Hamilton (11 May 1768 – 5 December 1843) was a Scottish architect based in Glasgow. He has been called the "father of the profession" in Glasgow.

== Career ==
Notable works include Hutchesons' Hall, Nelson Monument in Glasgow Green and Lennox Castle. The Royal Exchange in Queen Street is David Hamilton's best known building in Glasgow. It was completed in 1829, built around an existing mansion house dating from 1778. It now serves as the city's Gallery of Modern Art.

In 1835, Hamilton came third in the competition to design the Houses of Parliament (London) and won £500. He was the only Scottish architect to win a prize for his entry.

He is known to have been sculpted by both William Mossman and Patric Park.

Thomas Gildard and John Thomas Rochead were trained by him.

He was father-in-law to the architect James Smith and maternal grandfather of the alleged murderer Madeleine Smith.

== Gallery of his work ==
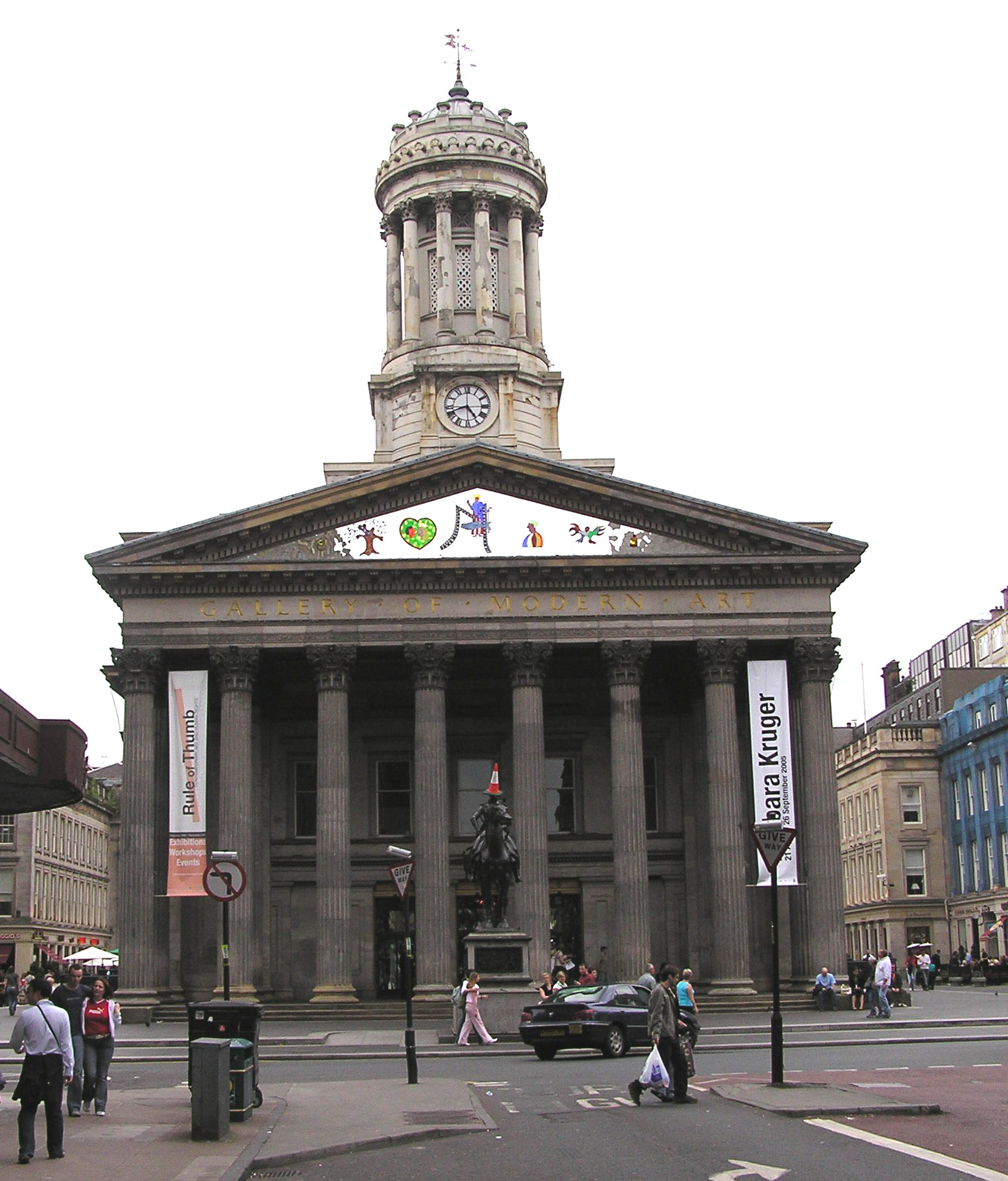
Façade of the Gallery of Modern Art on Queen Street, Glasgow

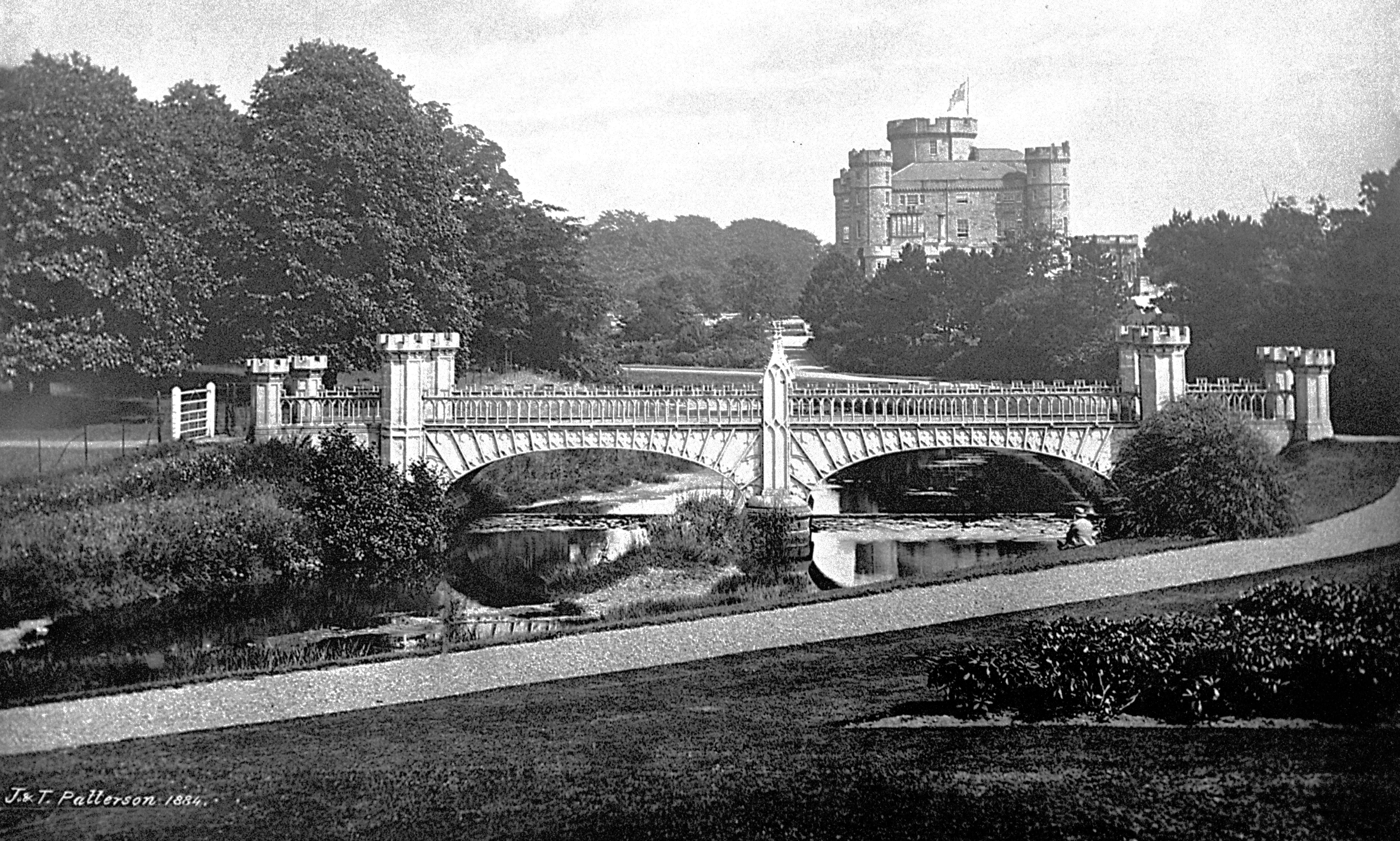
The Eglinton Tournament Bridge as designed by David Hamilton.

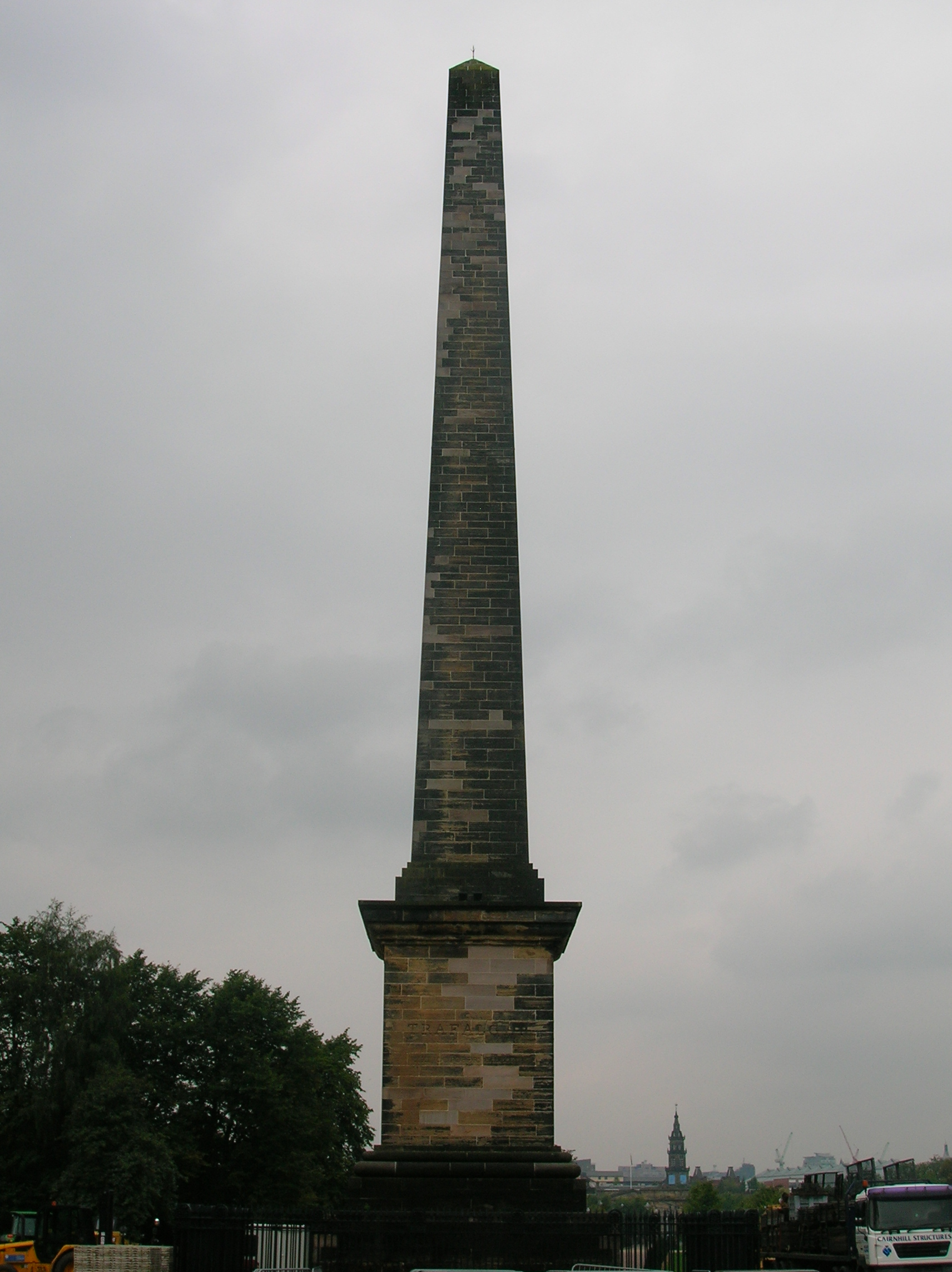
The Nelson monument in Glasgow Green.

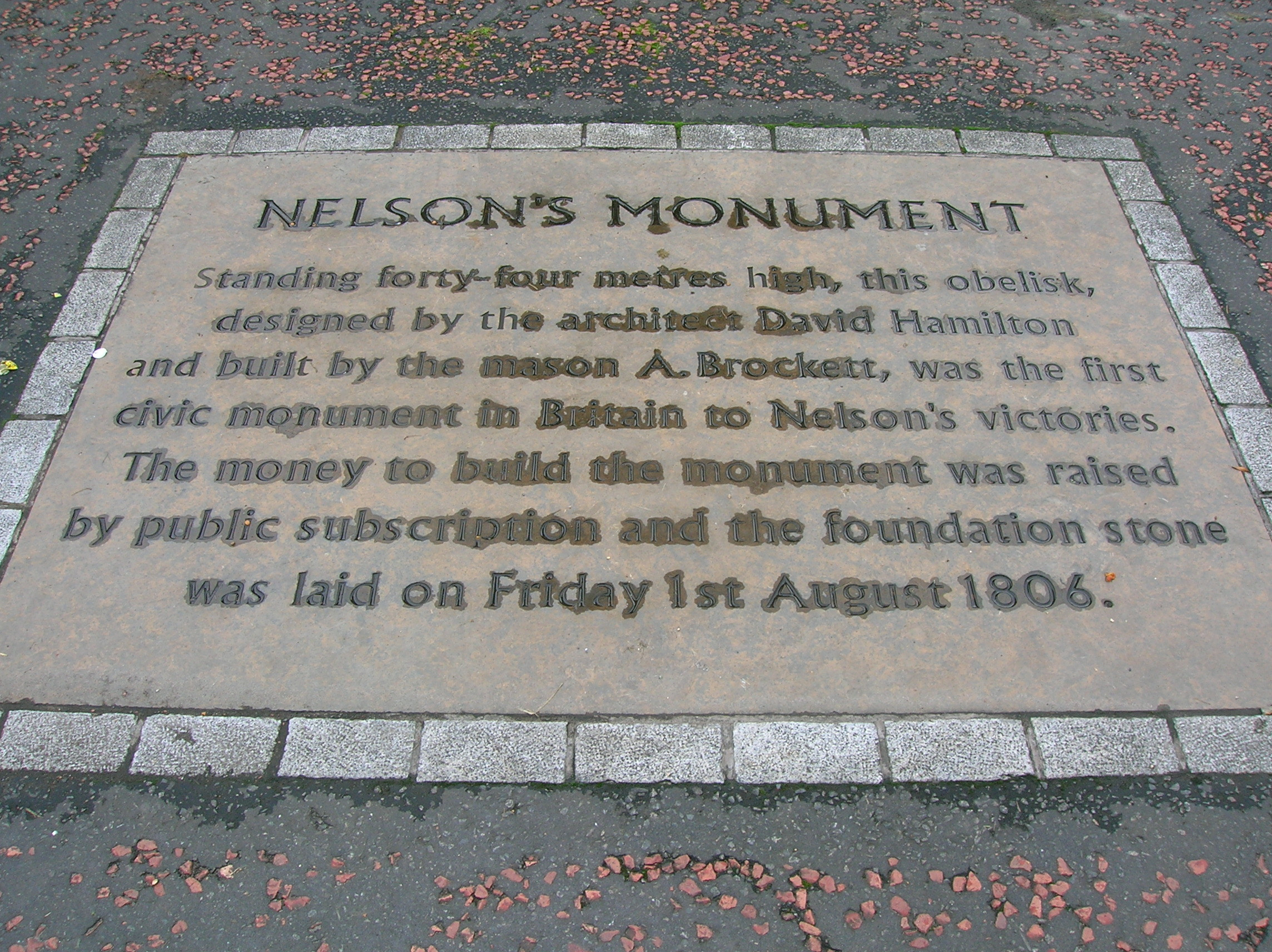
commemorative slab at the Nelson Monument.

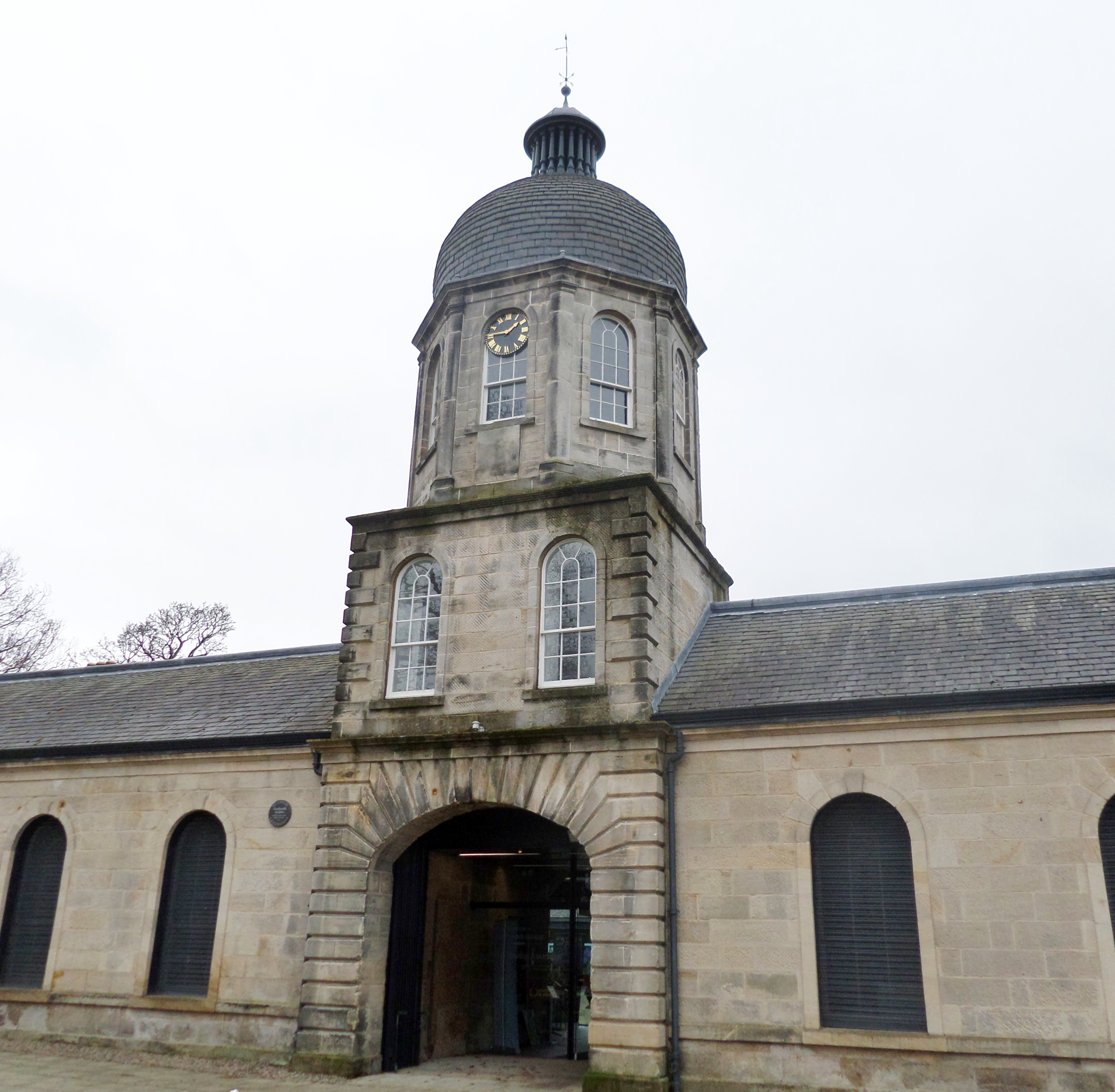
Stables block at Castlemilk estate.

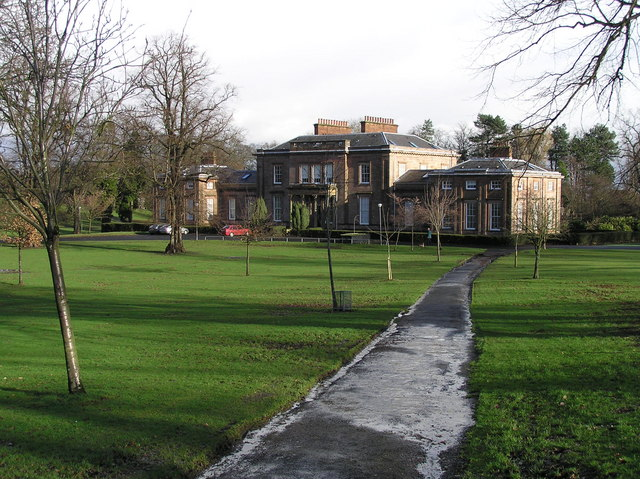
Aikenhead House, King's Park, Glasgow.

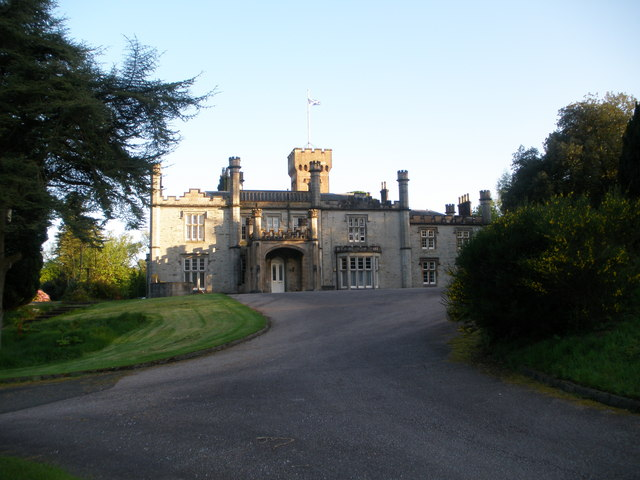
Hafton House in Hunters Quay, Argyll and Bute

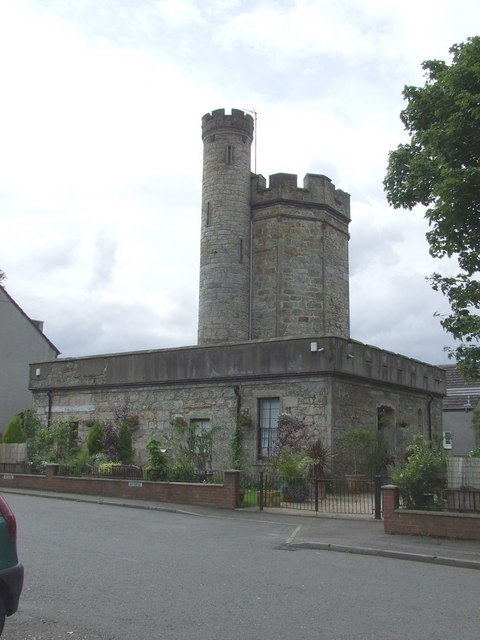
Balgray Tower in Glasgow.

== See also ==
- Eglinton Tournament Bridge Designed by David Hamilton & restored in 2008.
