= West Dunbartonshire Council =

Governing council in West Dunbartonshire, Scotland, UK

West Dunbartonshire Council Comhairle Siorrachd Dhùn Breatann an Iar
- Coat of arms

- Council logo

Leadership
- Provost: Karen Murray Conaghan, SNP since 28 August 2024
- Leader: Martin Rooney, Labour since 25 September 2024
- Chief Executive: Peter Hessett since 2022

Structure
- Seats: 22 councillors
- Graph of the party split among 22 seats.
- Political groups: Administration (8) Labour (8) Other parties (14) SNP (7) WDCP (1) Independent (6)

Elections
- Voting system: Single transferable vote
- Last election: 5 May 2022
- Next election: 6 May 2027

Meeting place
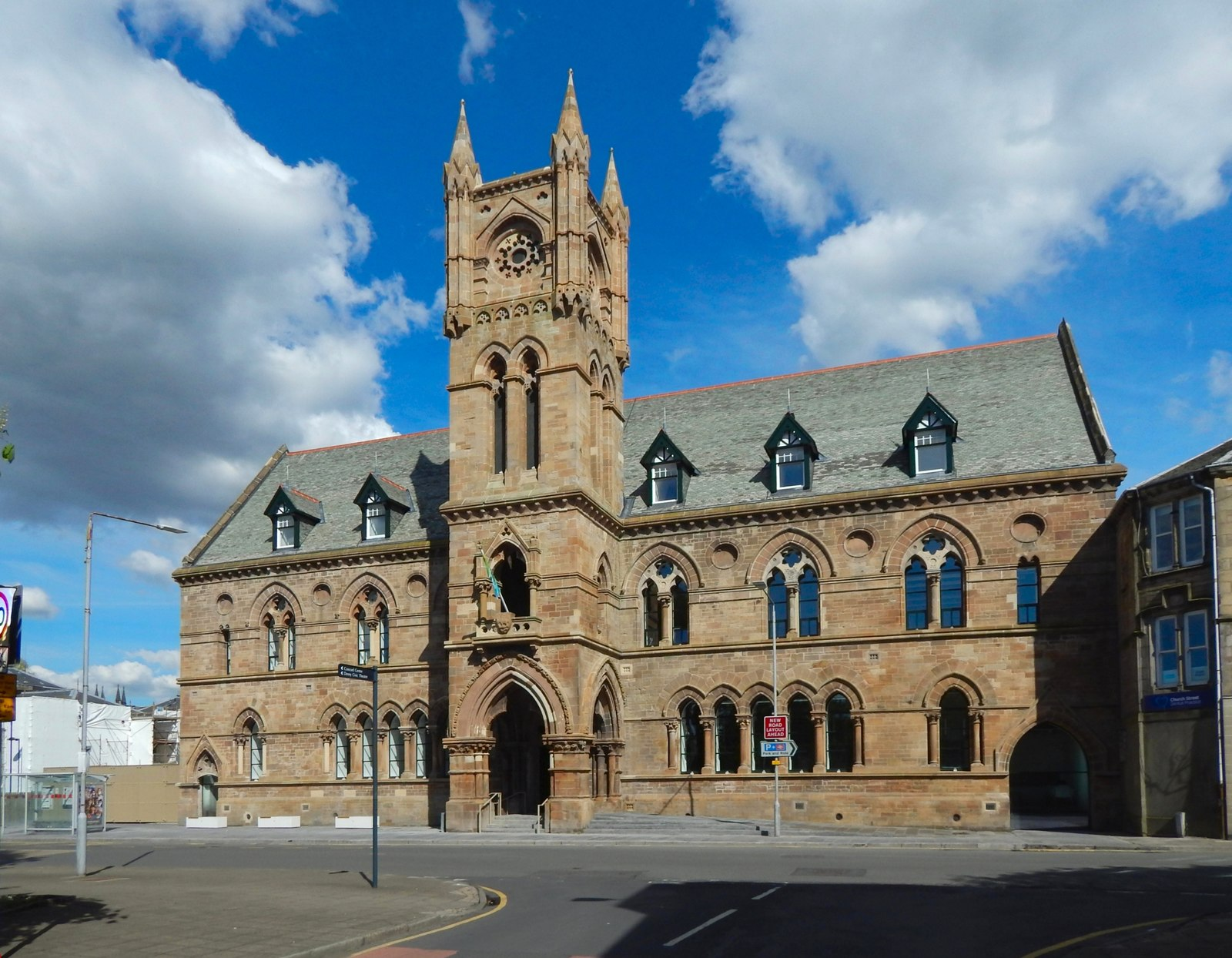
- Burgh Hall, 16 Church Street, Dumbarton, G82 1QL

Website
- www.west-dunbarton.gov.uk

West Dunbartonshire Council is the local authority for West Dunbartonshire, one of the 32 council areas of Scotland. The council is based in Dumbarton. It has alternately been under no overall control and under Labour control since 1996.

The council comprises 22 councillors elected from 6 wards.

== Administrative history ==
West Dunbartonshire and its council were created in 1996 under the Local Government etc. (Scotland) Act 1994. The 1994 act originally named the new district "Dumbarton and Clydebank", but the shadow authority elected in 1995 requested a change of name to "West Dunbartonshire", which was agreed by the government before the new council area came into force.

== Governance ==
=== Political control ===
At the 2022 election, Labour won a majority of the seats on the council. After by-elections and changes of allegiance, Labour lost its majority in August 2024 and resigned the leadership of the council. After the other parties and independent councillors were unable to agree an alternative administration, Labour was reinstated to the council's leadership positions in September 2024, running the council as a minority administration.

The first election was held in 1995, initially operating as a shadow authority alongside the outgoing authorities until the new system came into force on 1 April 1996. Political control of West Dunbartonshire Council since 1996 has been as follows:

Party in control	Years
Labour	1996–2007
No overall control	2007–2012
Labour	2012–2017
No overall control	2017–2022
Labour	2022–2024
No overall control	2024-present

=== Leadership ===
The role of provost is largely ceremonial in West Dunbartonshire. They chair full council meetings and act as the council's civic figurehead. Political leadership is provided by the leader of the council. The leaders since 1996 have been:

Councillor	Party	From	To
Mary Campbell	Labour	1 Apr 1996	4 Jun 1997
Andy White	Labour	4 Jun 1997	20 Dec 2006
Martin Rooney	Labour	20 Dec 2006	12 Mar 2007
Denis Agnew	Independent	12 Mar 2007	May 2007
Iain Robertson	SNP	16 May 2007	26 May 2010
Ronnie McColl	SNP	26 May 2010	May 2012
Martin Rooney	Labour	16 May 2012	May 2017
Jonathan McColl	SNP	17 May 2017	May 2022
Martin Rooney	Labour	18 May 2022	28 Aug 2024
Martin Rooney	Labour	25 Sep 2024	

=== Composition ===
Following the 2022 election and subsequent by-elections and changes of allegiance up to October 2026, the composition of the council was:

Party	Seats
Labour	8
SNP	7
West Dunbartonshire Community Party	1
Independent	6
Total	22

The next election is due in 2027.

== Premises ==
The council is based at the former Burgh Hall at 16 Church Street in Dumbarton. It also has an area office in the main shopping centre in Clydebank.

When the council was created in 1996, it inherited several buildings from its predecessors, including Municipal Buildings and Crosslet House from Dumbarton District Council, Clydebank Town Hall and the nearby Council Offices on Rosebery Place from Clydebank District Council, and the County Buildings, Dumbarton from Strathclyde Regional Council.

The council gradually consolidated its offices, with Crosslet House being demolished in 2015, the Rosebery Place offices being demolished in 2017, and the County Buildings being demolished in 2019.

In 2018 the council consolidated most of its offices to Burgh Hall, which had been vacant for some years. The front part of the 1866 building was retained and a modern office complex built to the rear. The Municipal Buildings in Dumbarton are still used by the council as a register office, whilst Clydebank Town Hall is now primarily an events venue.

== Elections ==
Since 2007 elections have been held every five years under the single transferable vote system, introduced by the Local Governance (Scotland) Act 2004. Election results since 1995 have been as follows:

Year	Seats	Labour	SNP	Conservative	Independent / Other	Notes
1995	22	14	7	0	1	
1999	22	14	7	0	1	New ward boundaries.
2003	22	17	3	0	2 (Note: 1 Scottish Socialist)	
2007	22	10	9	0	3 (Note: 1 Scottish Socialist)	New ward boundaries.
2012	22	12	6	0	4 (Note: 1 Scottish Socialist)	
2017	22	8	10	2	2 (Note: 1 West Dunbartonshire Community Party)	New ward boundaries.
2022	22	12	9	0	1 (Note: 1 West Dunbartonshire Community Party)	

== Wards ==
Map of the area's wards (2017 configuration)

Six multi-member wards were created for the 2007 election, replacing 22 single-member wards which had been in place since the creation of the council in 1995:

Ward number	Ward	Location	Largest settlement	Additional settlements	Seats
1	Lomond		Balloch	Gartocharn, Jamestown, Levenvale, Mill of Haldane	3
2	Leven		Alexandria	Bonhill, Dalmonach, Renton, Dumbarton (northern parts)	4
3	Dumbarton		Dumbarton	Milton, Bowling	4
4	Kilpatrick		Duntocher	Faifley, Hardgate	3
5	Clydebank Central		Clydebank		4
6	Clydebank Waterfront		Clydebank	Old Kilpatrick	4
