= Clydebank and Milngavie (Scottish Parliament constituency) =

Region or constituency of the Scottish Parliament

- Burgh constituency for the Scottish Parliament
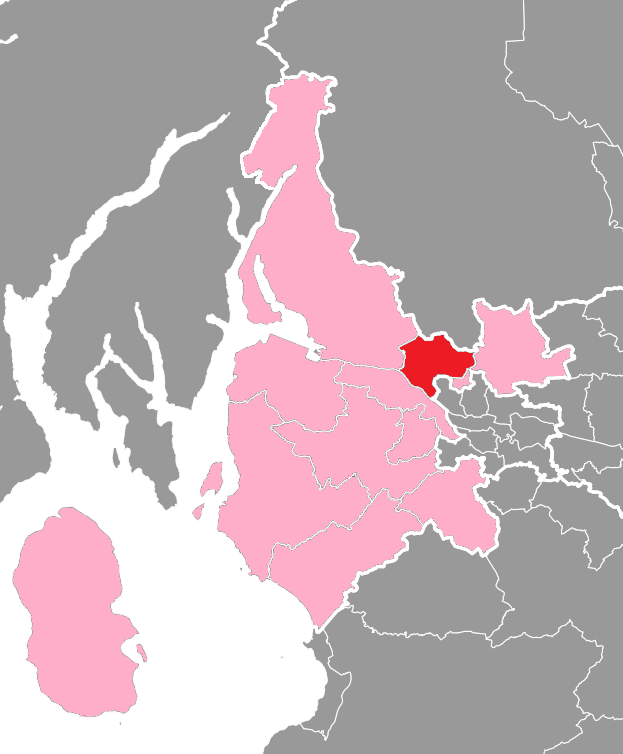

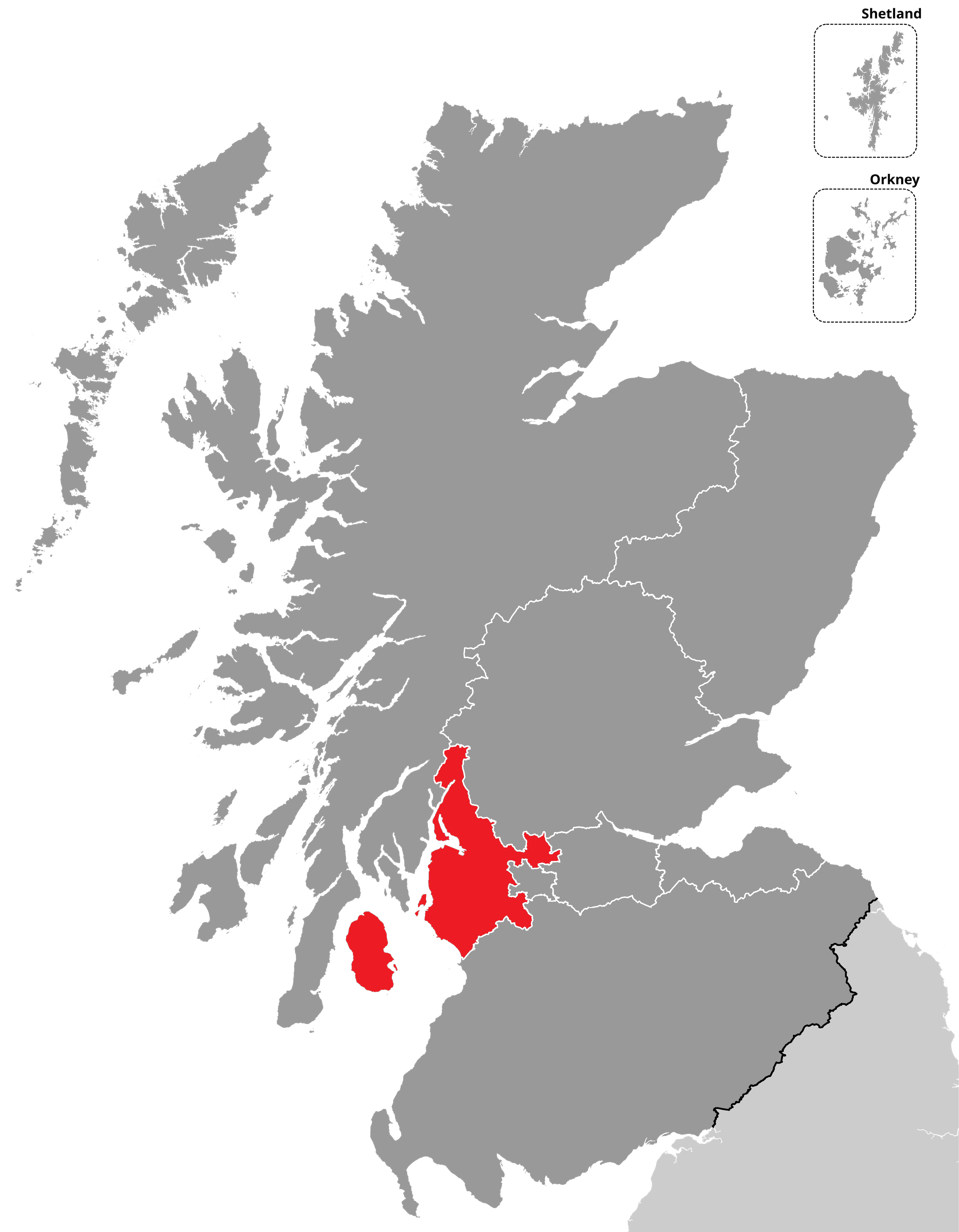
- Clydebank and Milngavie shown within the West Scotland electoral region and the region shown within Scotland
- Electoral region: West Scotland
- Electorate: 54,483 (2026)

Current constituency
- Created: 1999
- Party: Scottish National Party
- MSP: Marie McNair
- Council area: West Dunbartonshire; East Dunbartonshire

Clydebank and Milngavie (Gaelic: Bruach Chluaidh agus Muileann-Ghaidh) is a burgh constituency of the Scottish Parliament covering part of the council areas of East Dunbartonshire and West Dunbartonshire. Under the additional-member electoral system used for elections to the Scottish Parliament, it elects one Member of the Scottish Parliament (MSP) by the first past the post method of election. It is also one of ten constituencies in the West Scotland electoral region, which elects seven additional members, in addition to the ten constituency MSPs, to produce a form of proportional representation for the region as a whole.

The current member is Marie McNair of the Scottish National Party (SNP), who has held the seat since the 2021 Scottish Parliament election.

== Electoral region ==
The other nine constituencies of the West Scotland region are: Cunninghame North, Cunninghame South, Dumbarton, Eastwood, Inverclyde, Paisley, Renfrewshire North and Cardonald, Renfrewshire West and Levern Valley, and Strathkelvin and Bearsden. The region covers the whole of the council areas of East Dunbartonshire, East Renfrewshire, Inverclyde, North Ayrshire, Renfrewshire, and West Dunbartonshire; and parts of the council areas of Argyll and Bute, East Ayrshire, and Glasgow.

== Constituency boundaries and council area ==
Map of boundaries from 2011

The rest of East Dunbartonshire is covered by the Strathkelvin and Bearsden constituency; the rest of West Dunbartonshire is covered by the Dumbarton constituency.

The Clydebank and Milngavie constituency was created at the same time as the Scottish Parliament, in 1999, with the name and boundaries of the existing Clydebank and Milngavie UK Parliament constituency. Ahead of the 2005 United Kingdom general election the House of Commons constituencies in Scotland were altered, whilst the existing Scottish Parliament constituencies were retained. There is now no longer any link between the two sets of boundaries. The constituency boundaries were reviewed and altered ahead of the 2011 Scottish Parliament election. In 2025, ahead of the 2026 Scottish Parliament election, a further review was undertaken: a very minor boundary change was made in the Old Kilpatrick area where the constituency borders the Dumbarton constituency in order to align constituency and ward boundaries.

The electoral wards of East Dunbartonshire Council and West Dunbartonshire Council used in the current creation of Clydebank and Milngavie are:

- East Dunbartonshire
  - Milngavie (entire ward)
  - Bearsden North (entire ward)
- West Dunbartonshire
  - Kilpatrick (entire ward)
  - Clydebank Central (entire ward)
  - Clydebank Waterfront (entire ward)

== Member of the Scottish Parliament ==
Election	Member	Party
1999	Des McNulty	Labour
2011	Gil Paterson	SNP
2021	Marie McNair	SNP

== Election results ==
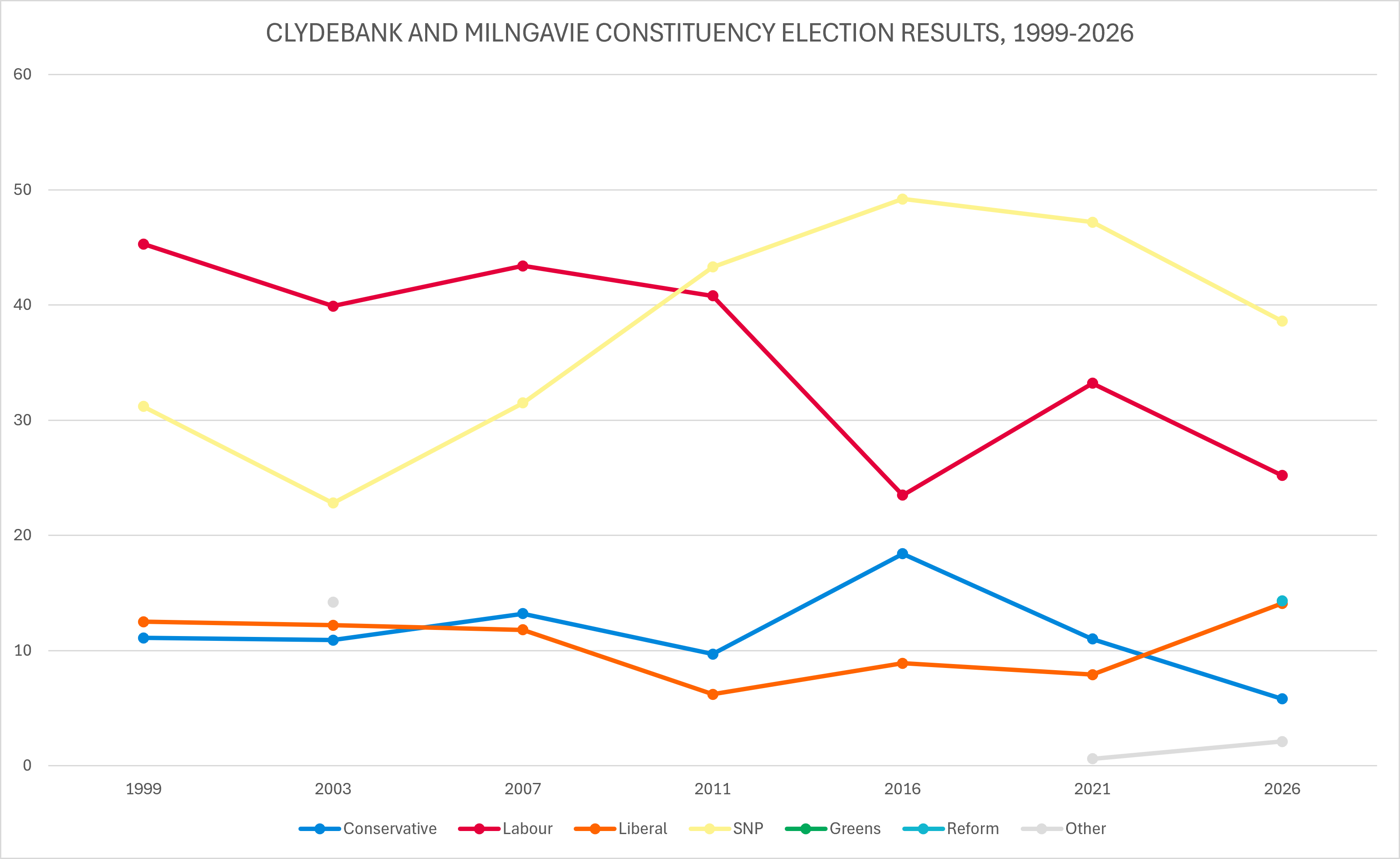
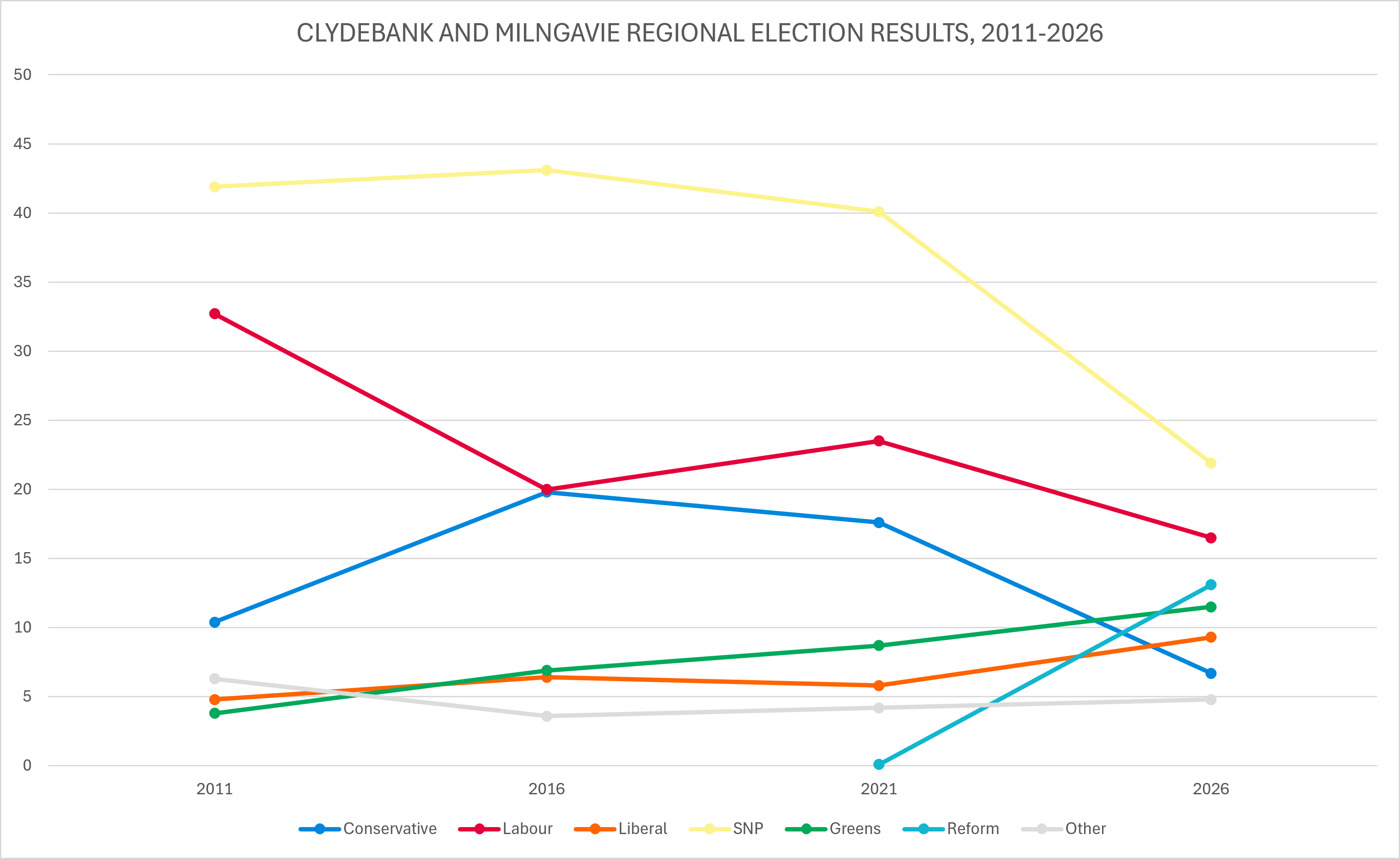

=== 2020s ===
2026 Scottish Parliament election: Clydebank and Milngavie
Party	Candidate	Constituency			Regional		
Party	Candidate	Votes	%	±%	Votes	%	±%
SNP	Marie McNair (Note: Incumbent member for this constituency)	12,126	38.6	▼8.6	8,249	26.1	▼14.0
Labour	Callum McNally	7,929	25.2	▼8.0	6,206	19.6	▼3.9
Reform	Andy White	4,510	14.3	New	4,958	15.7	▲15.6
Green					4,339	13.7	▲5.0
Liberal Democrats	Ben Langmead	4,419	14.1	▲6.2	3,491	11.0	▲5.2
Conservative	Alix Mathieson	1,820	5.8	▼5.2	2,527	7.9	▼9.7
Socialist Labour					275	0.8	New
Scottish Common Party	Claire Gallagher	647	2.1	New	269	0.8	New
Independent Green Voice					248	0.8	▲0.3
Scottish Family					222	0.7	▲0.2
AtLS					204	0.6	New
Liberal					196	0.6	New
ISP					126	0.4	New
Scottish Socialist					101	0.3	New
Independent	William Wallace				50	0.2	New
UKIP					47	0.1	Steady
Alliance for Democracy and Freedom Scotland					41	0.1	New
Independent	Paddy McCarthy				23	0.1	New
Scottish Libertarian					19	0.1	▼0.1
Independent	Paul Mack				7	0.0	New
Majority		4,197	13.3	▼0.7			
Valid votes		31,451			31,598		
Invalid votes		164			89		
Turnout		31,615	58.0	▼11.0	31,687	58.2	▼10.8
SNP hold		Swing		▼0.3			
Notes

2021 Scottish Parliament election: Clydebank and Milngavie
Party	Candidate	Constituency			Regional		
Party	Candidate	Votes	%	±%	Votes	%	±%
SNP	Marie McNair	17,787	47.2	▼2.0	15,121	40.1	▼3.0
Labour	Douglas McAllister	12,513	33.2	▲9.7	8,866	23.5	▲3.5
Conservative	Pam Gosal	4,153	11.0	▼7.4	6,622	17.6	▼2.2
Green					3,269	8.7	▲1.8
Liberal Democrats	Katy Gordon	2,987	7.9	▼1.0	2,169	5.8	▼0.6
Alba					576	1.5	New
All for Unity					343	0.9	New
Independent	Alexander Robertson	220	0.6	New			
Scottish Family					189	0.5	New
Independent Green Voice					172	0.5	New
Freedom Alliance (UK)					85	0.2	New
Abolish the Scottish Parliament					65	0.2	New
Scottish Libertarian					56	0.1	New
Reform					48	0.1	New
TUSC					47	0.1	New
UKIP					32	0.1	▼1.5
Independent	James Morrison				21	0.1	New
Independent	Maurice Campbell				18	0.0	New
Scotia Future					12	0.0	New
Renew					3	0.0	New
Majority		5,274	14.0	▼11.7			
Valid votes		37,660			37,714		
Invalid votes		107			66		
Turnout		37,767	69.0	▲8.8	37,780	69.0	▲8.8
SNP hold		Swing					

=== 2010s ===
2016 Scottish Parliament election: Clydebank and Milngavie
Party	Candidate	Constituency			Region		
Party	Candidate	Votes	%	±%	Votes	%	±%
SNP	Gil Paterson (Note: Incumbent member for this constituency)	16,158	49.2	▲5.9	14,216	43.1	▲1.2
Labour	Gail Casey	7,726	23.5	▼17.3	6,595	20.0	▼12.7
Conservative	Maurice Golden	6,029	18.4	▲8.7	6,536	19.8	▲9.4
Green					2,259	6.9	▲3.1
Liberal Democrats	Frank Bowles	2,925	8.9	▲2.7	2,126	6.4	▲1.6
UKIP					511	1.6	▲0.9
Solidarity					278	0.8	▲0.6
Scottish Christian					207	0.6	▼0.2
RISE					173	0.5	New
Scottish Libertarian					39	0.1	New
Majority		8,432	25.7	▲23.2			
Valid votes		32,838			32,940		
Invalid votes		114			50		
Turnout		32,952	60.2	▲6.5	32,990	60.2	▲6.5
SNP hold		Swing					
Notes

2011 Scottish Parliament election: Clydebank and Milngavie
Party	Candidate	Constituency			Region		
Party	Candidate	Votes	%	±%	Votes	%	±%
SNP	Gil Paterson (Note: Incumbent member on the party list, or for another constituency)	12,278	43.3	N/A	11,935	41.9	N/A
Labour	Des McNulty (Note: Incumbent member for this constituency)	11,564	40.8	N/A	9,295	32.7	N/A
Conservative	Alice Struthers	2,758	9.7	N/A	2,887	10.4	N/A
Liberal Democrats	John Duncan	1,769	6.2	N/A	1,379	4.8	N/A
Green					1,076	3.8	N/A
All-Scotland Pensioners Party					452	1.6	N/A
Scottish Christian					231	0.8	N/A
Socialist Labour					218	0.8	N/A
BNP					204	0.7	N/A
UKIP					200	0.7	N/A
Scottish Socialist					199	0.7	N/A
Ban Bankers Bonuses					111	0.4	N/A
Pirate					74	0.3	N/A
Solidarity					58	0.2	N/A
Independent	Richard Vassie				30	0.1	N/A
Majority		714	2.5	N/A			
Valid votes		28,369			28,349		
Invalid votes		109			110		
Turnout		28,478	53.7	N/A	28,459	53.7	N/A
SNP win (new boundaries)							

=== 2000s ===
2007 Scottish Parliament election: Clydebank and Milngavie
Party	Candidate	Votes	%	±%
Labour	Des McNulty	11,617	43.4	+3.5
SNP	Gil Paterson	8,438	31.5	+8.7
Conservative	Murray Roxburgh	3,544	13.2	+2.3
Liberal Democrats	Ashay Ghai	3,166	11.8	−0.4
Majority		3,179	11.9	−5.2
Turnout		26,765	55.9	+4.2
Labour hold		Swing		

2003 Scottish Parliament election: Clydebank and Milngavie
Party	Candidate	Votes	%	±%
Labour	Des McNulty	10,585	39.9	−5.4
SNP	James Yuill	6,051	22.8	−8.4
Liberal Democrats	Rod Ackland	3,224	12.2	−0.3
Conservative	Mary Leishman	2,885	10.9	−0.2
Scottish Socialist	Dawn Brennan	1,902	7.2	New
Independent	Danny McCafferty	1,867	7.0	New
Majority		4,534	17.1	+3.0
Turnout		26,514	51.7	−11.8
Labour hold		Swing		

=== 1990s ===
1999 Scottish Parliament election: Clydebank and Milngavie
Party	Candidate	Votes	%	±%
Labour	Des McNulty	15,105	45.3	N/A
SNP	James Yuill	10,395	31.2	N/A
Liberal Democrats	Rod Ackland	4,149	12.5	N/A
Conservative	Dorothy Luckhurst	3,688	11.1	N/A
Majority		4,710	14.1	N/A
Turnout		33,337	63.5	N/A
Labour win (new seat)				

== See also ==
- Clydebank and Milngavie (UK Parliament constituency)
