= 2012 West Dunbartonshire Council election =

2012 Scottish local government election

← 2007	3 May 2012	2017 →

All 22 seats to West Dunbartonshire Council 12 seats needed for a majority
	First party	Second party
Leader	Martin Rooney	Ronnie McColl
Party	Labour	SNP
Leader's seat	Lomond	Lomond (defeated)
Last election	10 seats, 37.7%	9 seats, 34.1%
Seats before	8	9
Seats won	12	6
Seat change	▲2	▼3
Popular vote	12,497	8,126
Percentage	46.6%	30.3%
Swing	▲8.9%	▼3.8%
	Third party	Fourth party
Leader	George Black	Jim Bollan
Party	Independent	Scottish Socialist
Leader's seat	Dumbarton	Leven
Last election	2 seats, 8.7%	1 seat, 6.7%
Seats before	3	1
Seats won	3	1
Seat change	▲1	Steady
Popular vote	3,503	1,407
Percentage	13.1%	5.3%
Swing	▲4.4%	▼1.4%
- Composition of the council after the election
Council Leader before election
Ronnie McColl defeated
SNP
Council Leader after election
Martin Rooney
Labour

The 2012 West Dunbartonshire Council election was held on 3 May 2012 on the same day as the 31 other local authorities in Scotland. The election used the six wards created under the Local Governance (Scotland) Act 2004, with 22 Councillors being elected. Each ward elected either 3 or 4 members, using the STV electoral system.

The election saw Labour gain 2 seats to secure an overall majority on the Council while also significantly increasing their vote. The Scottish National Party remained in second place on the Council but West Dunbartonshire proved to be their worst performance in Scotland as they lost 3 seats including that of Council leader Ronnie McColl. Independents increased their seat numbers to 3 through the addition of former Labour Councillor and the Scottish Socialist Party retained their sole seat - their only one in Scotland.

Following the election the Labour majority administration was formed. This replaced the previous SNP minority led administration which had been supported by Independent councillors that had existed from 2007-2012.

== Results ==
2012 West Dunbartonshire Council election result
Party	Seats	Gains	Losses	Net gain/loss	Seats %	Votes %	Votes	+/−
Labour	12	2	0	▲2	54.6	46.6	12,497	▲8.9
SNP	6	0	3	▼3	27.3	30.3	8,126	▼3.8
Independent	3	1	0	▲1	13.6	13.1	3,503	▲4.4
Scottish Socialist	1	0	0	Steady	4.6	5.3	1,407	▼1.4
Conservative	0	0	0	Steady	0.0	4.3	1,139	▼3.4
Communist	0	0	0	Steady	0.0	0.4	94	New
Scottish Christian	0	0	0	Steady	0.0	0.2	39	New

Note: "Votes" are the first preference votes. The net gain/loss and percentage changes relate to the result of the previous Scottish local elections on 3 May 2007. This may differ from other published sources showing gain/loss relative to seats held at dissolution of Scotland's councils.

== Ward results ==
=== Lomond ===
- 2007: 2xSNP; 1xLabour
- 2012: 2xLab; 1xSNP
- 2007-2012 Change: Lab gain one seat from SNP

Lomond - 3 seats
Party	Candidate	FPv%	Count						
Party	Candidate	FPv%	1	2	3	4	5	6	7
Labour	Martin Rooney (incumbent)	33.64	1,243						
SNP	Jonathan McColl *	18.35	678	686.9	711.2	736.5	775.5	784.5	1,342.9
SNP	Ronnie McColl (incumbent)	14.48	535	544.8	561.5	593	636.3	647.6	
Labour	Hazel Sorrell	14.18	524	789.4	840.7	884.9	998.8		
Conservative	Brian McKenzie Walker	9.34	345	350.9	354.9	416.4			
Independent	George Rice	5.66	209	214.1	238.9				
Scottish Socialist	Louise Robertson	4.36	161	167.9					
Electorate: 8,958 Valid: 3,695 Spoilt: 79 Quota: 924 Turnout: 3,774 (42.13%)

- = Sitting Councillor for a different Ward.

=== Leven ===
- 2007: 2xSNP; 1xLab; 1xSSP
- 2012: 2xLab; 1xSNP; 1xSSP
- 2007-2012 Change: Lab gain one seat from SNP

Leven - 4 seats
Party	Candidate	FPv%	Count						
Party	Candidate	FPv%	1	2	3	4	5	6	7
Labour	John Millar (incumbent)	31.8	1,622						
Scottish Socialist	Jim Bollan (incumbent)	21.0	1,073						
SNP	Gail Robertson	20.3	1,036						
Labour	Michelle Stewart	8.1	412	868.5	879.3	879.7	912.4	1,011.1	1,128.9
SNP	May Smillie (incumbent)	7.7	392	417.6	425.9	439.4	473.9	549.4	
Independent	Archie Thomson	6.4	329	359.4	371.6	371.9	459.8		
Conservative	David Jardine	4.6	237	244.8	247.9	248.1			
Electorate: 13,186 Valid: 5,101 Spoilt: 99 Quota: 1,021 Turnout: 5,200 (39.44%)

=== Dumbarton ===
- 2007: 2xLab; 1xSNP; 1xIndependent
- 2012: 2xLab; 1xSNP; 1xIndependent
- 2007-2012 Change: No change

Dumbarton - 4 seats
Party	Candidate	FPv%	Count						
Party	Candidate	FPv%	1	2	3	4	5	6	7
Labour	David McBride (incumbent)	30.59	1,678						
SNP	Ian Murray	18.01	988	1,015.3	1,027.1	1,039.1	1,050.8	1,071.1	1,130.4
Independent	George Black (incumbent)	13.96	766	788.1	803.4	818.6	840.2	905.1	1,146.6
Labour	Thomas Rainey	13.74	754	1,218.9					
SNP	Iain Robertson (incumbent)	10.21	560	568.6	574.9	581.2	583.7	597.1	621.3
Independent	Iain Ellis	6.60	362	368.9	377.8	380.2	418.1	465.1	
Conservative	Sally Page	4.14	227	230.5	233.6	234.7	241.2		
Independent	Andrew Muir	1.55	85	93.3	98	106.6			
Scottish Socialist	Cammy Fyfe	1.20	66	71.9	78				
Electorate: 12,620 Valid: 5,486 Quota: 1,098 Turnout: 5,600 (44.37%)

=== Kilpatrick ===
- 2007: 2xLab; 1xSNP
- 2012: 2xLab; 1xSNP
- 2007-2012 Change: No change

Kilpatrick - 3 seats
Party	Candidate	FPv%	Count					
Party	Candidate	FPv%	1	2	3	4	5	6
Labour	Douglas McAllister (incumbent)	48.01	1,717					
SNP	Jim Finn (incumbent)	21.11	755	785.2	811.4	823.7	839.6	1,110.5
Labour	Lawrence O'Neill (incumbent)	11.19	400	1,113.8				
SNP	Ian Dickson	7.96	285	291.2	301.4	305.5	324.4	
Independent	Walter Graham	7.27	260	284.9	321.9	336.8	388.8	408.2
Conservative	Douglas Boyle	3.38	121	125.8	134.7	135.1		
Scottish Socialist	Dawn Fyfe	1.06	38	41.8	53.8			
Electorate: 9,004 Valid: 3,576 Spoilt: 86 Quota: 895 Turnout: 3,662 (40.67%)

=== Clydebank Central ===
- 2007: 2xLab; 1xSNP; 1xIndependent
- 2012: 2xLab; 1xSNP; 1xIndependent
- 2007-2012 Change: No change

Clydebank Central - 4 seats
Party	Candidate	FPv%	Count					
Party	Candidate	FPv%	1	2	3	4	5	6
Labour	Patrick Gerard McGlinchey (incumbent)	34.83	1,587					
SNP	Jim Brown (incumbent)	26.36	1,201					
Independent	Denis Agnew (incumbent)	17.10	779	798.9	814.9	863	910	955
Labour	John Mooney	12.42	566	1,158.9				
SNP	Frank McNiff	5.20	237	250.6	493.9	523.1	541.8	564.6
Communist	Tom Morrison	2.06	94	98.7	103	114.9	119.2	
Conservative	Douglas Campbell	2.02	92	94.6	97.2	104.9		
Electorate: 11,559 Valid: 4,556 Spoilt: 108 Quota: 912 Turnout: 4,664 (40.35%)

=== Clydebank Waterfront ===
- 2007: 2xSNP; 2xLab
- 2012: 2xLab; 1xSNP; 1xIndependent
- 2007-2012 Change: Independent gain one seat from SNP

Clydebank Waterfront - 4 seats
Party	Candidate	FPv%	Count						
Party	Candidate	FPv%	1	2	3	4	5	6	7
Labour	Gail Casey (incumbent)	33.55	1,473						
SNP	William Hendrie (incumbent)	24.05	1,056						
Independent	Marie McNair (incumbent)†	16.24	713	777.1	785.2	796.6	809.8	842.8	901.5
Labour	Kath Ryall	11.87	521	929.9					
SNP	Jim McElhill (incumbent)	9.18	403	435.7	583.7	590.9	598.9	619.8	636.9
Conservative	Linda Kinniburgh	2.66	117	128.3	130.3	131.9	139.1	142.6	
Scottish Socialist	Ann Lynch	1.57	69	83.5	86.9	89.7	89.9		
Scottish Christian	Alastair Manderson	0.89	39	43	44.9	45.9			
Electorate: 11,451 Valid: 4,391 Spoilt: 108 Quota: 879 Turnout: 4,499 (39.29%)

== Aftermath ==
After the election Labour were able to form a majority administration. This replaced previous SNP led minority administration.

On 5 January 2016, Marie McNair joined the Scottish National Party and ceased to be an independent.
