= 2017 West Dunbartonshire Council election =

2017 Scottish local government election

← 2012	4 May 2017	2022 →

All 22 seats to West Dunbartonshire Council 12 seats needed for a majority
	First party	Second party	Third party
Leader	Jonathan McColl	Martin Rooney	Sally Page
Party	SNP	Labour	Conservative
Leader's seat	Lomond	Lomond	Lomond
Last election	6 seats, 30.3%	12 seats, 46.6%	0 seats, 4.3%
Seats before	7	12
Seats won	10	8	2
Seat change	▲4	▼4	▲2
Popular vote	12,422	10,408	3,869
Percentage	40.1%	33.6%	12.5%
Swing	▲9.8%	▼13.0%	▲8.2%
	Fourth party	Fifth party
Leader	Jim Bollan	Denis Agnew
Party	West Dunbartonshire Community	Independent
Leader's seat	Leven	Clydebank Central
Last election	Did not exist	3 seats, 13.1%
Seats before	0	3
Seats won	1	1
Seat change	▲1	▼2
Popular vote	2,413	1,648
Percentage	7.8%	5.3%
Swing	New	▼7.8%
Council Leader before election
Martin Rooney
Labour
Council Leader after election
Jonathan McColl
SNP

The 2017 West Dunbartonshire Council election was held on 4 May 2017, on the same day as the 31 other local authorities in Scotland. The election used the six wards created under the Local Governance (Scotland) Act 2004, with 22 Councillors being elected. Each ward will elect either 3 or 4 members, using the STV electoral system.

Following the 2012 election a Labour majority administration was formed. After this election, the SNP group and Councillor Denis Agnew formed a minority coalition administration, led by the SNP leader, Jonathan McColl. As part of the deal, the title of Bailie was revived, and Councillor Agnew was appointed as West Dunbartonshire's first. The 2017 election marked the first time that Conservatives were elected to the Council in its history.

== Results ==
2017 West Dunbartonshire Council election result
Party	Seats	Gains	Losses	Net gain/loss	Seats %	Votes %	Votes	+/−
SNP	10	4	0	▲4	45.45	40.1	12,422	▲9.8
Labour	8	0	4	▼4	36.4	33.6	10,408	▼13.0
Conservative	2	2	0	▲2	9.1	12.5	3,869	▲8.2
West Dunbartonshire Community	1	1	0	▲1	4.5	7.8	2,413	New
Independent	1	0	2	▼2	4.5	5.3	1,648	▼7.8
Liberal Democrats	0	0	0	Steady	0.0	0.43	133	New
Scottish Green	0	0	0	Steady	0.0	0.33	103	New

Note: "Votes" are the first preference votes. The net gain/loss and percentage changes relate to the result of the previous Scottish local elections on 3 May 2012. This may differ from other published sources showing gain/loss relative to seats held at dissolution of Scotland's councils.

== Ward results ==
=== Lomond ===
- 2012: 2xLab; 1xSNP
- 2017: 1xSNP; 1xLab; 1xCon
- 2012-2017 Change: Con gain one seat from Lab

Lomond - 3 seats
Party	Candidate	FPv%	Count					
Party	Candidate	FPv%	1	2	3	4	5	6
SNP	Jonathan McColl (incumbent)	24.8	1,082	1,109				
Labour	Martin Rooney (incumbent)	21.6	945	977	977.4	1,024.5	1,386.6	
Conservative	Sally Page	21.5	939	968	968.3	989.4	1,037.4	1,099.9
Labour	Hazel Sorrell (incumbent)	10.9	477	498	498.3	542.4		
SNP	Chris Pollock	10.5	458	481	495.7	604.0	639.1	674.9
West Dunbartonshire Community	Louise Robertson	5.6	246	300	300.6			
Independent	George Rice	5.0	218					
Electorate: 9,132 Valid: 4,365 Spoilt: 106 Quota: 1,092 Turnout: 48.9%

=== Leven ===
- 2012: 2xLab; 1xSNP; 1xSSP
- 2017: 2xSNP; 1xWDCP; 1xLab
- 2012-2017 Change: SNP and WDCP gain one each from Lab and SSP

Leven - 4 seats
Party	Candidate	FPv%	Count						
Party	Candidate	FPv%	1	2	3	4	5	6	7
SNP	Ian Dickson	23.0	1,353						
West Dunbartonshire Community	Jim Bollan (incumbent)	21.9	1,291						
Labour	John Millar (incumbent)	16.1	946	948.6	967.5	978.5	1,000.6	1,175.4	1,942.6
Labour	Michelle McGinty (incumbent)†	12.5	739	742.6	758.8	771.6	808.6	933.9	
SNP	Caroline McAllister	11.4	673	825.0	850.9	903.1	927.0	942.9	972.5
Conservative	Peter Parlane	11.1	655	655.5	663.1	669.7	704.0		
Liberal Democrats	George Drummond	2.3	133	135.2	143.9	153.3			
Scottish Green	Sean Quinn	1.7	103	108.3	120.7				
Electorate: 13,832 Valid: 5,893 Spoilt: 155 Quota: 1,179 Turnout: 43.7%

† Michelle McGinty was previously known as Michelle Stewart.

=== Dumbarton ===
- 2012: 2xLab; 1xSNP; 1xIndependent
- 2017: 2xSNP; 1xLab; 1xCon
- 2012-2017 Change: SNP and Con gain one each from Lab and Ind

Dumbarton - 4 seats
Party	Candidate	FPv%	Count					
Party	Candidate	FPv%	1	2	3	4	5	6
Labour	David McBride (incumbent)	26.9	1,762					
SNP	Karen Conaghan	22.8	1,499					
Conservative	Brian Walker	14.6	957	979.7	980.5	1,009.3	1,147.1	1,388.0
SNP	Iain McLaren	12.3	809	827.1	989.8	998.6	1,254.1	1,403.0
West Dunbartonshire Community	George Black (incumbent)	12.1	792	821.0	827.1	888.3		
Labour	Elizabeth Ruine	8.9	584	910.2	915.0	937.2	1,103.6	
Independent	Andrew Muir	2.4	159	168.4	170.9			
Electorate: 13,146 Valid: 6,562 Spoilt: 168 Quota: 1,313 Turnout: 51.2%

=== Kilpatrick ===
- 2012: 2xLab; 1xSNP
- 2017: 2xLab; 1xSNP
- 2012-2017 Change: No change

Kilpatrick - 3 seats
Party	Candidate	FPv%	Count				
Party	Candidate	FPv%	1	2	3	4	5
Labour	Douglas McAllister (incumbent)	40.7	1,704				
SNP	Jim Finn (incumbent)	23.1	965	1,000.9	1,019.5	1,023.2	1,738.6
SNP	Claire Gallagher	19.1	800	827.4	838.6	842.7	
Labour	Lawrence O'Neill (incumbent)	8.8	367	886.4	1,071.4		
Conservative	Hermione Spencer	8.2	346	369.2			
Electorate: 9,052 Valid: 4,182 Spoilt: 161 Quota: 1,046 Turnout: 48.0%

=== Clydebank Central ===
- 2012: 2xLab; 1xSNP; 1xIndependent
- 2017: 2xSNP; 1xLab; 1xIndependent
- 2012-2017 Change: SNP gain one from Lab

Clydebank Central - 4 seats
Party	Candidate	FPv%	Count					
Party	Candidate	FPv%	1	2	3	4	5	6
SNP	Jim Brown (incumbent)	32.8	1,631					
Labour	John Mooney (incumbent)	23.7	1,180					
Independent	Denis Agnew (incumbent)	15.9	791	806.2	880.0	893.7	953.5	1,050.8
SNP	Diane Docherty	14.3	714	1,298.0				
Conservative	Penny Hutton	8.9	441	443.7	450.1	454.1	460.5	524.7
Labour	Alan Sorrell	2.7	135	138.1	184.0	327.1	345.3	
West Dunbartonshire Community	Dean Allardice	1.7	84	87.1	123.4	125.3		
Electorate: 11,928 Valid: 4,976 Spoilt: 189 Quota: 996 Turnout: 43.3%

=== Clydebank Waterfront ===
- 2012: 2xLab; 1xSNP; 1xIndependent
- 2017: 2xSNP; 2xLab
- 2012-2017 Change: SNP gain one from Ind

Clydebank Waterfront - 4 seats
Party	Candidate	FPv%	Count								
Party	Candidate	FPv%	1	2	3	4	5	6	7	8	9
SNP	William Hendrie (incumbent)	29.6	1,487								
Labour	Gail Casey (incumbent)	25.9	1,298								
SNP	Marie McNair (incumbent)	12.0	601	933.9	945.3	947.3	966.2	1,051.9			
Conservative	David Jardine	10.6	531	534.9	546.2	548.2	560.2	597.0	597.5	612.3	
SNP	Frank McNiff	7.0	350	438.3	439.7	443.7	455.5	494.0	533.7		
Independent	Joe Henry	5.8	292	310.5	327.3	343.3	423.3				
Labour	Daniel Lennie	5.4	271	285.0	503.8	507.2	523.2	595.4	597.4	737.4	951.9
Independent	Locky Cameron	2.9	146	151.8	158.4	165.4					
Independent	Brian Murray	0.8	42	42.0	42.5						
Electorate: 11,689 Valid: 5,018 Spoilt: 171 Quota: 1,004 Turnout: 44.4%
