= 2007 West Dunbartonshire Council election =

2007 Scottish local government election

← 2003	3 May 2007	2012 →

All 22 seats to West Dunbartonshire Council 12 seats needed for a majority
	First party	Second party
Leader	Martin Rooney	Ronnie McColl
Party	Labour	SNP
Leader's seat	Lomond	Lomond
Last election	17 seats, 46.8%	3 seats, 33.6%
Seats before	15	3
Seats won	10	9
Seat change	▼7	▲6
Popular vote	13,596	12,307
Percentage	37.7%	34.1%
Swing	▼9.1%	▲0.5%
	Third party	Fourth party
Leader	George Black	Jim Bollan
Party	Independent	Scottish Socialist
Leader's seat	Dumbarton	Leven
Last election	1 seat, 6.5%	1 seat, 10.1%
Seats before	4	1
Seats won	2	1
Seat change	▲1	Steady
Popular vote	3,142	2,413
Percentage	8.7%	6.7%
Swing	▲2.2%	▼3.4%
Council Leader before election
Denis Agnew
Independent
Council Leader after election
Iain Robertson
SNP

The 2007 West Dunbartonshire Council election was held on 3 May 2007, the same day as the other Scottish local government elections and the Scottish Parliament general election. The election was the first one using six new wards created as a result of the Local Governance (Scotland) Act 2004, each elected three or four councillors using the single transferable vote system form of proportional representation. The new wards replace 22 single-member wards which used the plurality (first past the post) system of election.

== Results ==
2007 West Dunbartonshire Council election result
Party	Seats	Gains	Losses	Net gain/loss	Seats %	Votes %	Votes	+/−
Labour	10	-	-	▼7	45.5	37.7	13,596	▼9.1
SNP	9	-	-	▲6	40.9	34.1	12,307	▲0.5
Independent	2	-	-	▲1	9.1	8.7	3,142	▲2.2
Scottish Socialist	1	-	-	Steady	4.6	6.7	2,413	▼3.4
Conservative	0	-	-	Steady	0.0	7.6	2,726	▲4.6
Green	0	-	-	Steady	0.0	2.7	973	New
A Strong Voice for Clydebank	0	-	-	Steady	0.0	2.6	926	New

== Ward results ==
West Dunbartonshire Council election, 2007: Lomond
Party	Candidate	FPv%	%	Seat	Count
Labour	Martin Rooney	1,386	27.1	1	1
SNP	Craig McLaughlin	1,317	25.8	2	1
SNP	Ronald McColl	1,060	20.7		
Conservative	David Jardine	613	12.0		
Labour	Ann Rushforth	278	5.4		
Scottish Socialist	Louise Robertson	251	4.9		
Green	Richard Giles McCarthy	206	4.0		

West Dunbartonshire Council election, 2007: Leven
Party	Candidate	FPv%	%	Seat	Count
SNP	Jonathan McColl	1,680	24.2		
Labour	John Millar	1,542	22.2		
Scottish Socialist	Jim Bollan	1,469	21.1		
SNP	May Smillie	662	9.5		
Conservative	Ian McDonald	518	7.4		
Labour	Martin Neill	505	7.3		
Independent	Alan Gadsby-Turner	332	4.8		
Green	Carola Boehm	248	3.6		

West Dunbartonshire Council election, 2007: Dumbarton
Party	Candidate	FPv%	%	Seat	Count
Labour	Geoff Calvert	1,292	17.7		
SNP	Iain Robertson	1,204	16.5		
Labour	David McBride	1,107	15.2		
SNP	Betty Mitchell	979	13.4		
Conservative	Martyn Anthony McIntyre	719	9.9		
Independent	George Black	696	9.6		
Green	Rose Harvie	387	5.3		
Independent	Linda McColl	351	4.8		
Independent	Alistair Tuach	304	4.2		
Scottish Socialist	Les Robertson	242	3.3		

West Dunbartonshire Council election, 2007: Kilpatrick
Party	Candidate	FPv%	%	Seat	Count
Labour	Douglas McAllister	1,356	29.8		
Labour	Margaret Bootland	1,188	26.1		
SNP	Jim Finn	1,092	24.0		
SNP	Frank McNiff	403	8.8		
Conservative	Douglas John Boyle	378	8.3		
Scottish Socialist	Cammy Fyfe	138	3.0		

West Dunbartonshire Council election, 2007: Clydebank Central
Party	Candidate	FPv%	%	Seat	Count
Labour	Patrick Gerard McGlinchey	1,610	26.0		
SNP	Jim Brown	1,423	23.0		
Labour	Willie McLaughlin††	873	14.1		
Independent	Denis Agnew	601	9.7		
A Strong Voice for Clydebank	Andy White	548	8.8		
SNP	Alex Scullion	467	7.6		
Conservative	David James Crichton	221	3.6		
Independent	Locky Cameron	155	2.5		
Green	Danielle Casey	132	2.1		
Scottish Socialist	Alex Cunningham	115	1.9		
Independent	Charles Murray	30	0.5		

West Dunbartonshire Council election, 2007: Clydebank Waterfront
Party	Candidate	FPv%	%	Seat	Count
Labour	Gail Casey	1,922	32.0		
SNP	William Hendrie	1,435	23.9		
SNP	Jim McElhill	585	9.7		
Labour	Marie McNair†	537	8.9		
Independent	Dennis Brogan	407	6.8		
A Strong Voice for Clydebank	Jackie Maceira	378	6.3		
Conservative	Terry Stables	277	4.6		
Independent	Joe Brady	266	4.4		
Scottish Socialist	Dawn Fyfe	198	3.3		

== Aftermath ==
On 3 November 2008, Clydebank Waterfront Cllr Marie McNair resigned from the Labour Party and then sat as an Independent.

On 2 February 2009, Clydebank Central Cllr Willie McLaughlin resigned from the Labour Party and sat as an Independent until 30 March 2011, when he sat as a member of Ban Bankers' Bonuses.

Labour's Margaret Bootland resigned due to ill health in December 2010. The by-election was won by Labour's Lawrence O'Neill on 3 March 2011.

Kilpatrick By-Election (3 March 2011) - 1 seat
Party	Candidate	FPv%	Count
Party	Candidate	FPv%	1
Labour	Lawrence O'Neill	60.01	1,382
SNP	Frank McNiff	32.94	758
Conservative	Douglas Boyle	6.99	161
Electorate: 8,963 Valid: 2,301 Spoilt: 26 Quota: 1,151 Turnout: 2,327 (25.98%)
