= Lomond (ward) =

Electoral ward in West Dunbartonshire, Scotland

Location of the ward

Lomond is one of the six wards used to elect members of the West Dunbartonshire Council. It elects three Councillors.

The ward covers the northern parts of the Vale of Leven closest to Loch Lomond and the rural area east of the loch, including Balloch, Gartocharn, Jamestown, Levenvale, Mill of Haldane, Rosshead and Tullichewan.

== Councillors ==
Election	Councillors		
2007	Ronald McColl (SNP)	Craig McLaughlin (SNP)	Martin Rooney (Labour)
2012	Jonathan McColl (SNP)	Hazel Sorrell (Labour)	Martin Rooney (Labour)
2017	Jonathan McColl (SNP)	Sally Page (Conservative)	Martin Rooney (Labour)
2022	Jonathan McColl (SNP)	Hazel Sorrell (Labour)	Martin Rooney (Labour)

== Election results ==
=== 2022 election ===
2022 West Dunbartonshire Council election

Lomond - 3 seats
Party	Candidate	FPv%	Count				
Party	Candidate	FPv%	1	2	3	4	5
SNP	Jonathan McColl (incumbent)	34.5	1,494				
Labour	Martin Rooney (incumbent)	21.7	938	1,017.4	1,163.1		
Labour	Hazel Sorrell	16.6	719	782.1	969.3	1,035.0	1,433.5
Conservative	Sally Page (incumbent)	15.4	666	680.9	731.0	735.2	
West Dunbartonshire Community	Drew MacEoghainn	11.8	509	620.7			
Electorate: 9,111 Valid: 4,326 Spoilt: 75 Quota: 1,082 Turnout: 48.3%

=== 2017 election ===
2017 West Dunbartonshire Council election

Lomond - 3 seats
Party	Candidate	FPv%	Count					
Party	Candidate	FPv%	1	2	3	4	5	6
SNP	Jonathan McColl (incumbent)	24.8	1,082	1,109				
Labour	Martin Rooney (incumbent)	21.6	945	977	977.4	1,024.5	1,386.6	
Conservative	Sally Page	21.5	939	968	968.3	989.4	1,037.4	1,099.9
Labour	Hazel Sorrell (incumbent)	10.9	477	498	498.3	542.4		
SNP	Chris Pollock	10.5	458	481	495.7	604.0	639.1	674.9
West Dunbartonshire Community	Louise Robertson	5.6	246	300	300.6			
Independent	George Rice	5.0	218					
Electorate: 9,132 Valid: 4,365 Spoilt: 106 Quota: 1,092 Turnout: 48.9%

=== 2012 election ===
2012 West Dunbartonshire Council election

Lomond - 3 seats
Party	Candidate	FPv%	Count						
Party	Candidate	FPv%	1	2	3	4	5	6	7
Labour	Martin Rooney (incumbent)	33.64	1,243						
SNP	Jonathan McColl *	18.35	678	686.9	711.2	736.5	775.5	784.5	1,342.9
SNP	Ronnie McColl (incumbent)	14.48	535	544.8	561.5	593	636.3	647.6	
Labour	Hazel Sorrell	14.18	524	789.4	840.7	884.9	998.8		
Conservative	Brian McKenzie Walker	9.34	345	350.9	354.9	416.4			
Independent	George Rice	5.66	209	214.1	238.9				
Scottish Socialist	Louise Robertson	4.36	161	167.9					
Electorate: 8,958 Valid: 3,695 Spoilt: 79 Quota: 924 Turnout: 3,774 (42.13%)

=== 2007 election ===
2007 West Dunbartonshire Council election

2007 West Dunbartonshire Council election: Lomond
Party	Candidate	FPv%	%	Seat	Count
Labour	Martin Rooney	1,386	27.1	1	1
SNP	Craig McLaughlin	1,317	25.8	1	1
SNP	Ronald McColl	1,060	20.7		
Conservative	David Jardine	613	12.0		
Labour	Ann Rushforth	278	5.4		
Scottish Socialist	Louise Robertson	251	4.9		
Scottish Green	Richard Giles McCarthy	206	4.0		
