= 2022 West Dunbartonshire Council election =

West Dunbartonshire Council election

- 5 May 2022

All 22 seats to West Dunbartonshire Council 12 seats needed for a majority
	First party	Second party	Third party
Leader	Martin Rooney	Jonathon McColl	Jim Bollan
Party	Labour	SNP	West Dunbartonshire Community
Leader's seat	Lomond	Lomond	Leven
Last election	8 seats, 33.6%	10 seats, 40.1%	1 seat, 7.8%
Seats before	8	10	1
Seats won	12	9	1
Seat change	▲4	▼1	Steady
Popular vote	12,473	12,676	1,462
Percentage	41.9%	42.6%	4.9%
Swing	▲8.3%	▲2.5%	▼2.9%
Council Leader before election
Jonathan McColl
SNP
Council Leader after election
Martin Rooney
Labour

The 2022 West Dunbartonshire Council election was held on 5 May 2022, on the same day as the 31 other local authorities in Scotland. The election used the six wards created under the Local Governance (Scotland) Act 2004, with 22 councillors being elected. Each ward elected either 3 or 4 members, using the STV electoral system - a form of proportional representation.

The SNP minority administration formed after the 2017 election was replaced with a new Labour majority administration.

== Results ==
2022 West Dunbartonshire Council election result
Party	Seats	Gains	Losses	Net gain/loss	Seats %	Votes %	Votes	+/−
Labour	12	4	0	▲4	54.5	41.9	12,473	▲8.3
SNP	9	0	1	▼1	40.9	42.6	12,676	▲2.5
West Dunbartonshire Community	1	0	0	Steady	4.5	4.9	1,462	▼2.9
Conservative	0	0	2	▼2	0.0	8.9	2,644	▼3.6
Green	0	0	0	Steady	0.0	0.7	206	▲0.4
Scottish Family	0	0	0	Steady	0.0	0.4	121	New
TUSC	0	0	0	Steady	0.0	0.2	73	New
Independent	0	0	1	▼1	0.0	0.2	51	▼5.1
Scottish Libertarian	0	0	0	Steady	0.0	0.2	45	New
Sovereignty	0	0	0	Steady	0.0	0.1	30	New

== Ward results ==
=== Lomond ===
- 2017: 1xSNP; 1xLab; 1xCon
- 2022: 2xLab; 1xSNP
- 2017-2022 Change: Lab gain one seat from Con

Lomond - 3 seats
Party	Candidate	FPv%	Count				
Party	Candidate	FPv%	1	2	3	4	5
SNP	Jonathan McColl (incumbent)	34.5	1,494				
Labour	Martin Rooney (incumbent)	21.7	938	1,017.4	1,163.1		
Labour	Hazel Sorrell	16.6	719	782.1	969.3	1,035.0	1,433.5
Conservative	Sally Page (incumbent)	15.4	666	680.9	731.0	735.2	
West Dunbartonshire Community	Drew MacEoghainn	11.8	509	620.7			
Electorate: 9,111 Valid: 4,326 Spoilt: 75 Quota: 1,082 Turnout: 48.3%

=== Leven ===
- 2017: 2xSNP; 1xWDCP; 1xLab
- 2022: 2xLab; 1xSNP; 1xWDCP;
- 2017-2022 Change: Lab gain one from SNP

Leven - 4 seats
Party	Candidate	FPv%	Count						
Party	Candidate	FPv%	1	2	3	4	5	6	7
SNP	Ian Dickson (incumbent)	25.7	1,494						
Labour	John Millar (incumbent)	18.7	1,089	1,095.2	1,101.2	1,116.8	1,184.3		
Labour	Michelle McGinty	16.4	956	963.3	966.3	997.8	1,116.8	1,130.7	1,280.3
West Dunbartonshire Community	Jim Bollan (incumbent)	16.4	953	972.2	988.4	1,047.1	1,136.1	1,138.2	1,500.6
SNP	Ronnie McColl	11.2	653	913.3	917.3	1,007.6	1,017.3	1,017.9	
Conservative	Matthew Dillon	7.2	420	421.1	432.1	439.3			
Green	Paula Baker	3.5	206	226.5	231.7				
Independent	Sian Wilkie	0.9	51	51.7					
Electorate: 13,820 Valid: 5,822 Spoilt: 129 Quota: 1,165 Turnout: 43.1%

=== Dumbarton ===
- 2017: 2xSNP; 1xLab; 1xCon
- 2022: 2xLab; 2xSNP
- 2017-2022 Change: Lab gain one from Con

Dumbarton - 4 seats
Party	Candidate	FPv%	Count					
Party	Candidate	FPv%	1	2	3	4	5	6
SNP	Karen Conoghan (incumbent)	33.8	2,171					
Labour	David McBride (incumbent)	31.8	2,045					
Labour	Gurpreet Singh Johal	14.5	950	987	1,546.5			
Conservative	Brian Walker (incumbent)	9.4	601	602.9	642.4	682.5	686.5	696.4
SNP	Chris Pollock	8.2	592	1,246.2	1,265.4	1,291.8	1,295.8	1,305.8
TUSC	Lynda McEwan	1.1	73	86.9	99.9	123.0	127.7	137.4
Scottish Libertarian	Johnathan Rainey	0.7	45	49.7	54.8	62.3	68.5	
Sovereignty	Kelly Wilson	0.5	30	30.8	32.2	34.3		
Electorate: 13,336 Valid: 6,524 Spoilt: 163 Quota: 1,305 Turnout: 50.1%

=== Kilpatrick ===
- 2017: 2xLab; 1xSNP
- 2022: 2xLab; 1xSNP
- 2017-2022 Change: no change

Kilpatrick - 3 seats
Party	Candidate	FPv%	Count	
Party	Candidate	FPv%	1	2
Labour	Douglas McAllister (incumbent)	49.1	1,903	
SNP	Gordon Scanlan	25.4	986	
SNP	Marina Scanlan	12.5	486	524.2
Labour	Lawrence O'Neill (incumbent)	7.0	272	1,020.6
Conservative	David Jardine	5.9	229	269.7
Electorate: 8,987 Valid: 4,059 Spoilt: 183 Quota: 970 Turnout: 45.2%

=== Clydebank Central ===
- 2017: 2xSNP; 1xLab; 1xIndependent
- 2022: 2xSNP; 2xLab
- 2017-2022 Change: Lab gain one seat from Independent

Clydebank Central - 4 seats
Party	Candidate	FPv%	Count			
Party	Candidate	FPv%	1	2	3	4
SNP	Diane Docherty (incumbent)	41.0	1,903			
Labour	Craig Edward	25.8	1,199			
Labour	Claire Steel	13.9	645	717.7	900.7	1,137.8
SNP	Sophie Traynor	11.1	531	1,367.8		
Conservative	Liam Wilson	7.9	366	368.6	384.2	390.5
Electorate: 11,820 Valid: 4,848 Spoilt: 204 Quota: 929 Turnout: 41.0%

=== Clydebank Waterfront ===
- 2017: 2xSNP; 2xLab
- 2022: 2xSNP; 2xLab
- 2017-2022 Change: no change

Clydebank Waterfront - 4 seats
Party	Candidate	FPv%	Count					
Party	Candidate	FPv%	1	2	3	4	5	6
SNP	James McElhill	31.8	1,493					
Labour	Daniel Lennie (incumbent)	25.9	1,217					
SNP	Lauren Oxley	16.3	767	1,179.9				
Labour	June McKay	11.5	540	571.5	811.4	822.1	868	1,093.5
Conservative	Holly Moscrop	7.7	362	367.2	374.2	376.6	403.9	
SNP	Jacob Toland	4.2	196	255.3	259.5	475.1	493.2	500.8
Scottish Family	Brian Michael Lally	2.6	121	125.4	129.5	130.6		
Electorate: 11,537 Valid: 4,696 Spoilt: 158 Quota: 940 Turnout: 42.1%

== Aftermath ==
Labour won twelve seats, giving them the majority they needed to regain control of the council from the SNP, who had won control in 2017. Martin Rooney was appointed Council Leader, with Michelle McGinty serving as his deputy.

Clydebank Central SNP councillor Diane Docherty quit the SNP group in January 2023, and now sits as an independent.

In July 2024 Labour councillor and Provost Douglas McAllister was elected to Parliament for the West Dunbartonshire constituency during the 2024 United Kingdom general election, and as such stood back from being Provost.

Ex-council leader Dumbarton SNP councillor Jonathon McColl quit the SNP group on 19 August 2024, and now sits as an independent.

Clydebank Waterfront Labour councillors Daniel Lennie and June McKay quit the Labour group in August 2024, and now sit as independents. This resulted in the Labour group losing control of the council. However, in September 2024, it was announced that Labour will retain control of the council as a minority administration, as opposition councillors were unable to form a coalition administration.

On 28 August 2024, Dumbarton councillor Karen Murray Conaghan was elected to serve as the new Provost, becoming the first woman to hold the position in the history of the council.

=== Clydebank Central by-election ===
A by-election was held on 13 June 2024 after Clydebank Central Labour councillor Craig Edward was removed from the party group after being charged with possession of indecent images and had resigned as a councillor after pleading guilty. It was won by the Labour candidate Fiona Hennebry.

Clydebank Central by-election (13 June 2024) - 1 seat
Party	Candidate	FPv%	Count			
Party	Candidate	FPv%	1	2	3	4
Labour	Fiona Hennebry	49.6	1,398	1,400	1,404	1,425
SNP	Marina Scanlan	38.9	1,095	1,099	1,118	1,127
Conservative	Ewan McGinnigle	4.4	125	126	126	130
Independent	Andrew Muir	3.1	87	87	91	98
Liberal Democrats	Kai Robert Murray Pyper	1.8	52	56	59	
Communist	Nathan Hennebry	1.7	47	47		
Sovereignty	Kelly Wilson	0.4	12			
Electorate: 11,702 Valid: 2,816 Spoilt: 29 Quota: 1,409 Turnout: 24.3%

=== Kilpatrick by-election ===
In September 2024 Labour councillor and newly elected Member of Parliament Douglas McAllister resigned as a councillor. A by-election was held in the Kilpatrick ward on 28 November 2024.

Kilpatrick by-election (28 November 2024) - 1 seat
Party	Candidate	FPv%	Count					
Party	Candidate	FPv%	1	2	3	4	5	6
Labour	William Rooney	42.75	725	731	736	753	782	814
SNP	Marina Scanlan	30.31	514	514	518	523	559	564
Reform	David Haydn Smith	10.38	176	178	184	186	191	200
Conservative	Ewan McGinnigle	5.72	97	97	97	102	103	
Green	Paula Baker	4.30	73	83	84	95		
Liberal Democrats	Kai O'Connor	3.71	63	64	66			
Scottish Family	Andrew Muir	1.47	25	25				
Communist	Dylan McAllister	1.36	23					
Electorate: 8,879 Valid: 1,696 Spoilt: 9 Quota: 849 Turnout: 19.2%

=== Clydebank Waterfront by-election ===
In March the incumbent SNP councillor resigned from the council triggering a by-election.

Clydebank Waterfront by-election (15 May 2025) - 1 seat
Party	Candidate	FPv%	Count						
Party	Candidate	FPv%	1	2	3	4	5	6	7
SNP	Kevin Crawford	35.6	1,039	1,042	1,061	1,095	1,098	1,123	1,331
Reform	David Smith	26.3	768	722	780	782	808	840	919
Labour	Maureen McGlinchey	25.3	739	742	745	759	770	822	
Liberal Democrats	Cameron Eoin Stewart	4.7	138	138	138	154	167		
Conservative	Brian Walker	2.9	84	85	85	87			
Green	Eryn Browning	2.6	76	77	83				
Alba	Kristopher Duncan	1.6	47	51					
Scottish Family	Andrew Muir	0.9	25						
Electorate: 11,657 Valid: 2,916 Spoilt: 38 Turnout: 25.3%

Eryn Browning was deselected as the Scottish Greens' candidate, but retained their logo attached to her name on the ballot.
