= Johnny Blues Well =

Johnny Blue's Well
- Year: 1800s
- Type: Public fountain
- Medium: Stone
- Dimensions: 1.3 m × 2.15 m (4.3 ft × 7.1 ft)
- Location: Neilston, Glasgow, Scotland; 55°47′13.2″N 4°23′47.2″W

The Johnny Blue's Wells (Scots: Johnny Blue Waal) (Barrhead Dialect) is a spring well in the back roads district in East Renfrewshire, Scotland. Standing 1.3 metres (4 ft 3 in) high and 2.15 metres (7 ft 1 in) wide, it is a small former watering point between Neilston and Barrhead on Springfield Road.

== History ==
According to local tradition, Johnny Blue was a print maker in the dye works who walked past the well going home to Neilston and reputedly washed the blue dye off himself there. His real name was James Ferguson and he came from Gateside. Ferguson was also a poet, two of his poems appeared in Vale of Leven poet, Hugh Caldwell's 1903 collection as part of a brief flyting between the two writers and a further poem appears in The Annals of Barrhead.

"Johnnie Blue" wis a poet, Gateside his abode,
His well's situated on Neilston back-road,
An' over its waters he cast a great spell,
That they'd a' be poets who drank oot the well.

— Hugh Caldwell, 2nd stanza of "Johnnie Blue's Well"

In 2017, the East Renfrewshire Council assured Barrhead residents that the local landmark would be preserved after concerns were raised about a new housing development at the site. Residents have requested a plaque to be mounted and it be declared a historic site.
