= Vale of Leven =

Area of West Dunbartonshire, Scotland

Coordinates: 55.9780°N 4.5808°W

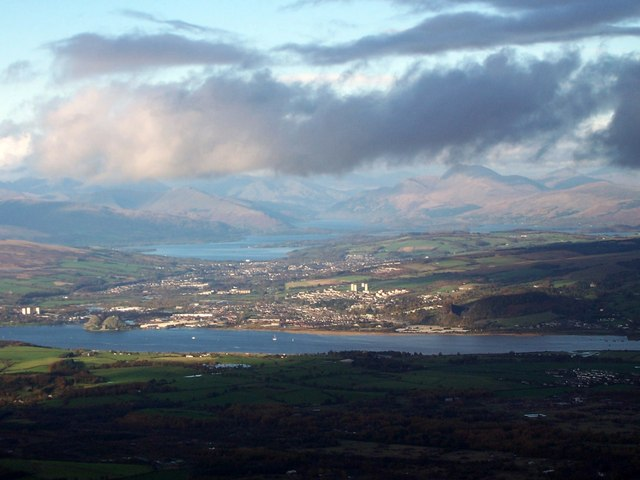
View of the Vale of Leven from the south side of the Clyde, with Loch Lomond and the Scottish Highlands in the distance

The Vale of Leven (Scottish Gaelic: Magh Leamhna) is an area of West Dunbartonshire, Scotland, comprising the valley of the River Leven. It historically formed the core of the region of Lennox.

Geographically, the Vale runs from Loch Lomond in the north to Dumbarton in the south, where the River Leven empties into the Clyde. However, the name is often applied specifically to the urban area towards the north of the valley, consisting of a number of communities. These were historically separate villages but have expanded into one conurbation. The largest of these communities is the town of Alexandria, which sits on the west bank of the Leven. Alexandria is connected to the village of Renton to the south and to the village of Balloch to the north. Across the river from Alexandria is Bonhill, which is connected to Jamestown to the north. The combined population of these areas in 2020 was approximately 22,000.

The area's name lends itself to Alexandria's local football club, Vale of Leven F.C.; the secondary school, Vale of Leven Academy; the Vale of Leven District General Hospital; and other local organisations.

== Geography ==
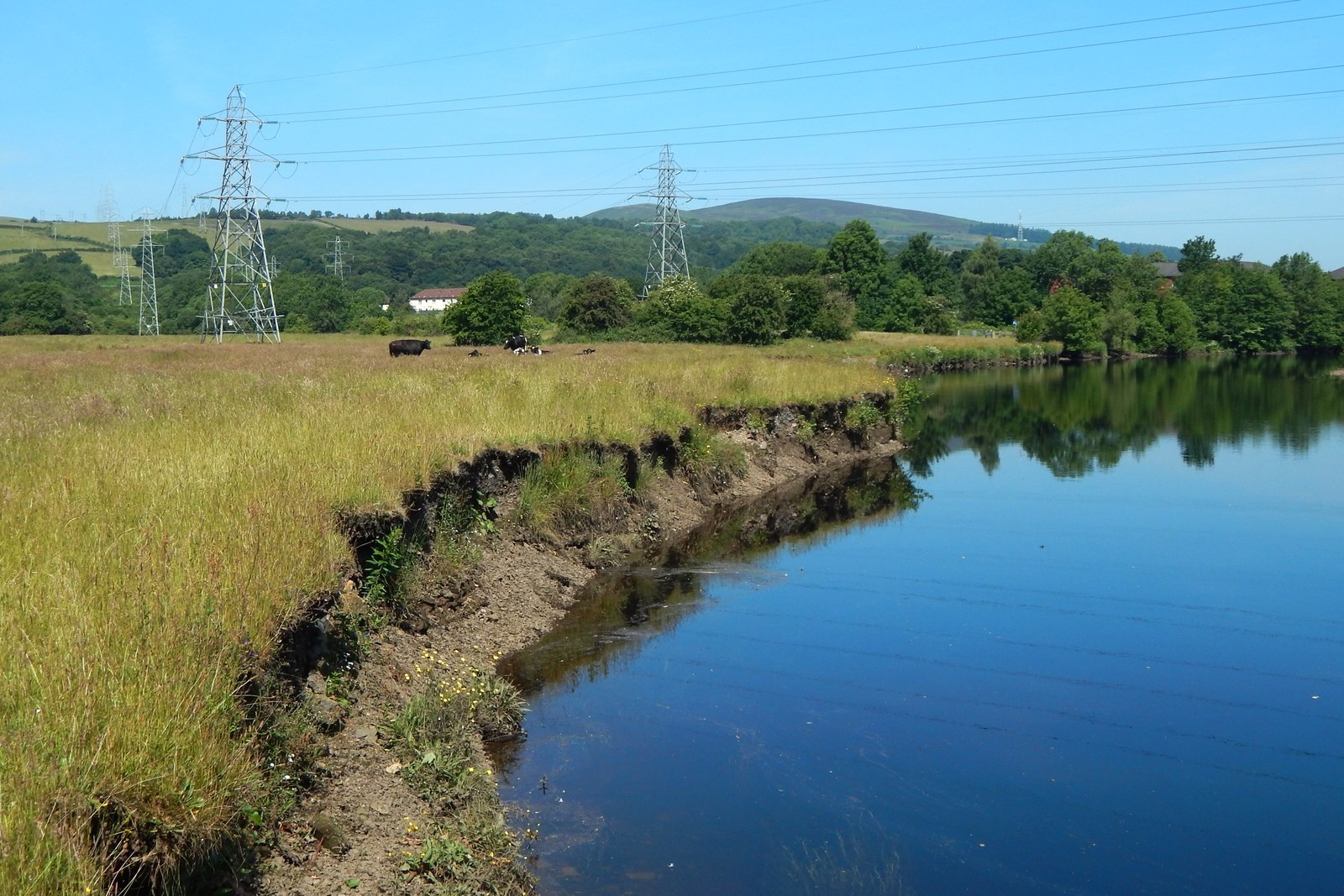
A rural part of the Vale

The Vale is bounded on the east by the Kilpatrick Hills, while the hills to the west form a minor offshoot of the Scottish Highlands, comprising Ben Bouie, Mount Mallow and Carman Muir. The valley was shaped by glacial action associated with the last glacial period in Britain, the Loch Lomond Readvance. While the valley itself is mostly sedimentary and metamorphic, the surrounding hills are composed of 340 million year old igneous rock from the carboniferous. Notably, Dumbarton Rock consists of the remnants of a volcanic plug formed during the same period.

== History ==
Carman Hill is a large hillfort sitting west of Renton. Despite its impressive size, a lack of detailed archaeological investigations make the timing of its inhabitation and many other basic details uncertain, but its close geographical proximity to the major fortress of Alcluith at Dumbarton Rock (sited where the River Leven meets the River Clyde) suggests a relationship with this important iron age centre. After incorporation of Alcluith's successor state, Strathclyde, into the kingdom of Scotland, the Vale of Leven became the political centre of the Earldom of Lennox. By the 13th century nearby Dumbarton was centrally controlled by the crown as a royal burgh, however the Vale of Leven remained a relatively wild area. As an example, in 1230 when the Earl of Lennox granted valuable fishing rights on the River Leven to local monks, he had to promise them protection to enable them to work there. After the Wars of Independence, Robert the Bruce purchased land in Cardross and the Vale of Leven. He lived and ruled from there until his death in 1329. There is a small King Robert the Bruce Heritage Centre situated at the train station in Renton.

The Vale of Leven was an area of small farms and relatively low population until industrialisation started with the establishment of a bleach-field at Dalquhurn, Renton in 1715. Both dyeing and bleaching industries were attracted to the area by the reliable and fast flowing waters of the River Leven. By the 1830's dye works had spread along the river from Renton to Balloch. Individual works included those at Dalquhurn, Cordale, Bonhill, Alexandria, Milton, Dalmonach, Dillichip, Ferryfield and Levenbank. People emigrated from the Highlands, from Ireland and from northern England to staff this industry, and the five villages of The Vale grew. In 1897 several of these works amalgamated as the United Turkey Red Company. The last dyeworks in the area was the British Silk Factory which closed in 1980. Current notable employers include Loch Lomond Distilleries, Chivas Brothers distillers, and Aggreko Generators. The tourism and hospitality industries are also important local employers.

== Politics ==
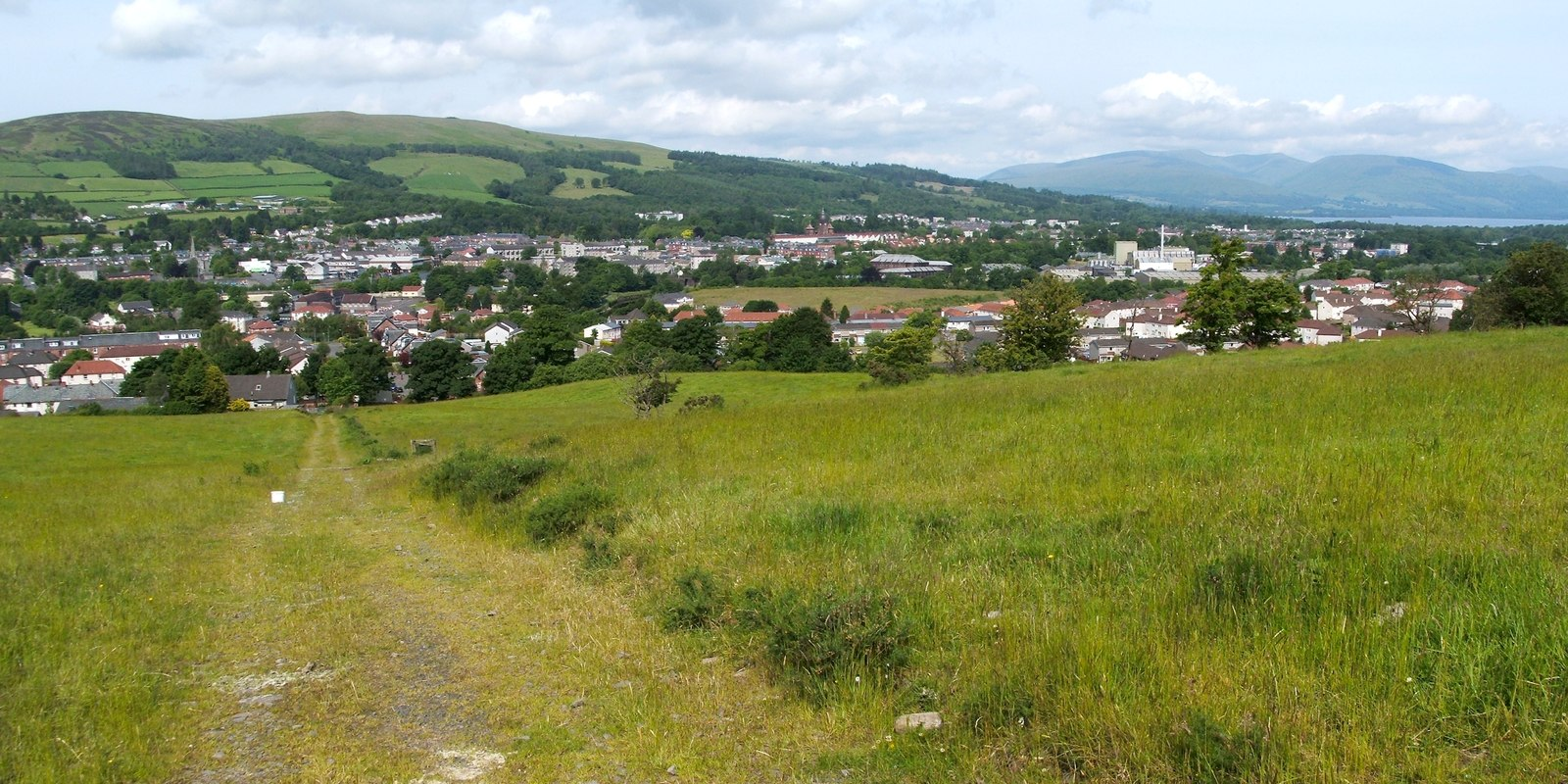
View over Bonhill and Alexandria

The area is traditionally industrial, based particularly on the dyeing industry, but with the decline of manufacturing in Scotland has had to look to new areas for employment. The area had exceptionally high levels of unemployment in the 1920s and 1930s, which gave it a radical reputation, with Communism and Socialism being popular political philosophies in particular. During that time it was known as one of the "Little Moscows" in Britain, i.e. an area where the Communist Party of Great Britain had exceptional strength. The Vale of Leven District Council (which disappeared in the local government reorganisation of the 1970s) could have had the distinction of being the only local council in Great Britain where the Communist Party were ever the largest single party, although unlike most of the "little Moscows" it was not a coal mining area. The Communist Party went into serious decline locally in the 1950s under the influence of the Cold War, more quickly than in some other "little Moscows". However, there was an important industrial struggle during the early 1970s when the Plessey factory experienced a lengthy sit-in, objecting to its proposed closure.

In recent years the Labour Party and the Scottish National Party have been the dominant parties in the area, though Jim Bollan of the West Dunbartonshire Community Party and formerly the Scottish Socialist Party has been a councillor for the Leven ward of West Dunbartonshire council since 2007.

== Sport ==
The Vale of Leven was a hotspot for the early development of Scottish football. This relatively small area gave birth to numerous football clubs, of which the most successful were Vale of Leven FC and Renton FC. Neither is currently a senior team, but by 1888 the 2 clubs had won 5 Scottish Cup finals between them. As well as football teams, The Vale currently is home to the Vale of Leven Golf Club, the Vale of Leven Cricket Club, the Loch Lomond Rugby Club, a swimming pool, several bowling clubs, and the Vale of Leven & District Angling Club. The latter reflects the River Leven's historic recognition as a salmon and trout river.

== Walking and cycling ==
Two major walking and/or cycling routes cross the Vale of Leven. National Cycling Network route 7 (Glasgow to Balloch) runs along the length of the River Leven and the John Muir Way crosses the northern end of the valley. There are also many local hill walking routes leading to Cardross, Helensburgh and Glen Fruin to the west and into the Kilpatrick hills to the east.

== Transport ==
Train links to Glasgow with railway stations at Balloch, Alexandria and Renton. Bus links to Glasgow via Dumbarton and Clydebank. Also bus routes to Drymen, Helensburgh, and Luss. The A82 trunk road from Glasgow to Fort William runs through the Vale of Leven.
