= Clydebank Central (ward) =

Electoral ward in West Dunbartonshire, Scotland

Location of the ward

Clydebank Central is one of the six wards used to elect members of the West Dunbartonshire Council. It elects four Councillors.

The ward covers northern parts of the town of Clydebank, although despite its name it only includes part of the town centre, namely the areas north of the Forth and Clyde Canal at the Clyde Shopping Centre, Clyde Retail Park and Clydebank Business Centre, while south of the canal is within the Clydebank Waterfront ward. West of Boquhanran Road tunnel, the boundary between the wards changes from the canal to the Argyle Line / North Clyde Line railway tracks. Residential neighbourhoods in the ward include Drumry, Kilbowie, Linnvale, North Mountblow, Parkhall and Radnor Park

== Councillors ==
Election	Councillors			
2007	Patrick Gerard McGlinchey (Labour)	Willie McLaughlin (Labour)	Jim Brown (SNP)	Denis Agnew (Ind.)
2012	Patrick Gerard McGlinchey (Labour)	John Mooney (Labour)	Jim Brown (SNP)	Denis Agnew (Ind.)
2017	Diane Docherty (Ind.)	John Mooney (Labour)	Jim Brown (SNP)	Denis Agnew (Ind.)
2022	Diane Docherty (Ind.)	Fiona Hennebry (Labour)	Sophie Traynor (SNP)	Craig Edward (Labour)
2024 by-	Diane Docherty (Ind.)	Fiona Hennebry (Labour)	Sophie Traynor (SNP)	Clare Steel (Labour)

== Election results ==
=== 2024 by-election ===
Clydebank Central by-election (13 June 2024) - 1 seat
Party	Candidate	FPv%	Count			
Party	Candidate	FPv%	1	2	3	4
Labour	Fiona Hennebry	49.6	1,398	1,400	1,404	1,425
SNP	Marina Scanlan	38.9	1,095	1,099	1,118	1,127
Conservative	Ewan McGinnigle	4.4	125	126	126	130
Independent	Andrew Muir	3.1	87	87	91	98
Scottish Liberal Democrats	Kai Robert Murray Pyper	1.8	52	56	59	
Communist	Nathan Hennebry	1.7	47	47		
Independent	Kelly Wilson	0.4	12			
Electorate: 11,702 Valid: 2,816 Spoilt: 29 Quota: 1,409 Turnout: 24.3%

=== 2022 Election ===
2022 West Dunbartonshire Council election

Clydebank Central - 4 seats
Party	Candidate	FPv%	Count			
Party	Candidate	FPv%	1	2	3	4
SNP	Diane Docherty (incumbent)	41.0	1,903			
Labour	Craig Edward	25.8	1,199			
Labour	Clare Steel	13.9	645	717.7	900.7	1,137.8
SNP	Sophie Traynor	11.1	531	1,367.8		
Conservative	Liam Wilson	7.9	366	368.6	384.2	390.5
Electorate: 11,820 Valid: 4,848 Spoilt: 204 Quota: 929 Turnout: 41.0%

=== 2017 Election ===
2017 West Dunbartonshire Council election

Clydebank Central - 4 seats
Party	Candidate	FPv%	Count					
Party	Candidate	FPv%	1	2	3	4	5	6
SNP	Jim Brown (incumbent)	32.8	1,631					
Labour	John Mooney (incumbent)	23.7	1,180					
Independent	Denis Agnew (incumbent)	15.9	791	806.2	880.0	893.7	953.5	1,050.8
SNP	Diane Docherty	14.3	714	1,298.0				
Conservative	Penny Hutton	8.9	441	443.7	450.1	454.1	460.5	524.7
Labour	Alan Sorrell	2.7	135	138.1	184.0	327.1	345.3	
West Dunbartonshire Community	Dean Allardice	1.7	84	87.1	123.4	125.3		
Electorate: 11,928 Valid: 4,976 Spoilt: 189 Quota: 996 Turnout: 43.3

=== 2012 Election ===
2012 West Dunbartonshire Council election

Clydebank Central - 4 seats
Party	Candidate	FPv%	Count					
Party	Candidate	FPv%	1	2	3	4	5	6
Labour	Patrick Gerard McGlinchey (incumbent)	34.83	1,587					
SNP	Jim Brown (incumbent)	26.36	1,201					
Independent	Denis Agnew (incumbent)	17.10	779	798.9	814.9	863	910	955
Labour	John Mooney	12.42	566	1,158.9				
SNP	Frank McNiff	5.20	237	250.6	493.9	523.1	541.8	564.6
Communist	Tom Morrison	2.06	94	98.7	103	114.9	119.2	
Conservative	Douglas Campbell	2.02	92	94.6	97.2	104.9		
Electorate: 11,559 Valid: 4,556 Spoilt: 108 Quota: 912 Turnout: 4,664 (40.35%)

=== 2007 Election ===
2007 West Dunbartonshire Council election

West Dunbartonshire Council election, 2007: Clydebank Central
Party	Candidate	FPv%	%	Seat	Count
Labour	Patrick Gerard McGlinchey	1,610	26.0		
SNP	Jim Brown	1,423	23.0		
Labour	Willie McLaughlin††	873	14.1		
Independent	Denis Agnew	601	9.7		
A Strong Voice for Clydebank	Andy White	548	8.8		
SNP	Alex Scullion	467	7.6		
Conservative	David James Crichton	221	3.6		
Independent	Locky Cameron	155	2.5		
Green	Danielle Casey	132	2.1		
Scottish Socialist	Alex Cunningham	115	1.9		
Independent	Charles Murray	30	0.5		
