= Local government in Scotland =

System of state administration on a local level in Scotland

Local government in Scotland comprises thirty-two local authorities, commonly referred to as councils. Each council provides public services, including education, social care, waste management, libraries and planning. Councils receive the majority of their funding from the Scottish Government, but operate independently and are accountable to their local electorates. Councils raise additional income via the Council Tax, a locally variable domestic property tax, and Business rates, a non-domestic property tax.

Councils are made up of councillors who are directly elected by the residents of the area they represent. Each council area is divided into a number of wards, and three or four councillors are elected for each ward. There are currently 1,226 elected councillors in Scotland. Local elections are normally held every five years and use the single transferable vote electoral system. The most recent election was the 2022 Scottish local elections and the next election will be the 2027 Scottish local elections.

Council administrations typically comprise a group of councillors within the council who are able to command majority support. Minority administrations and majority administrations may be formed. Although coalition administrations are more typical, occasionally a majority administration is formed by a single political party, but this is uncommon due to the proportional voting system used in Scottish local elections. Despite being uncommon on the Scottish mainland, it is possible for independent politicians to form an administration.

The Convention of Scottish Local Authorities (COSLA) is an umbrella organisation formed in 1975 to represent the views of Scotland's thirty-two councils to central government.

== History ==
=== Origins ===
The history of Scottish local government mainly surrounds involves the counties of Scotland. The counties have their origins in the sheriffdoms or shires over which a sheriff (a contraction of shire reeve) exercised jurisdiction.

Malcolm III appears to have introduced sheriffs as part of a policy of replacing native "Celtic" forms of government with Anglo Saxon and French feudal structures. This was continued by his sons Edgar, Alexander I and in particular David I. David completed the division of the country into sheriffdoms by the conversion of existing thanedoms.

From the seventeenth century the shires started to be used for local administration apart from judicial functions. In 1667 Commissioners of Supply were appointed in each sheriffdom to collect the land tax. The commissioners eventually assumed other duties in the county. In 1858, police forces were established in each county under the Police (Scotland) Act 1857.

As a result of the dual system of local government, burghs (of which there were various types) often had a high degree of autonomy.

=== Modern history ===
The Local Government etc. (Scotland) Act 1994 abolished the two-tier structure of regions and districts created by the Local Government (Scotland) Act 1973

Between 1890 and 1975 local government in Scotland was organised with county councils (including four counties of cities) and various lower-level units. Between 1890 and 1929, there were parish councils and town councils, but with the passing of the Local Government (Scotland) Act 1929, the functions of parish councils were passed to larger district councils and a distinction was made between large burghs (i.e. those with a population of 20,000 or more) and small burghs. This system was further refined by the passing of the Local Government (Scotland) Act 1947.

Effective from 1975, the Local Government (Scotland) Act 1973 passed by the Conservative government of Edward Heath introduced a system of two-tier local government in Scotland (see Local government areas of Scotland 1973 to 1996), divided between large regional councils and smaller district councils. The only exceptions to this were the three island councils, Western Isles, Shetland and Orkney which had the combined powers of regions and districts. The Conservative government of John Major (1990–1997) decided to abolish this system and merge their powers into new unitary authorities. The new councils vary wildly in size – some are the same as counties, such as Clackmannanshire, some are the same as former districts, such as Inverclyde, and some are the same as the former regions, such as Highland. The changes took effect in 1996 with shadow councillors elected in 1995 to oversee the smooth transition of control.

In 2007, council elections moved to the single transferable vote system, with wards represented by either three or four councillors. The transition has resulted in no uncontested seats and has ended single-party controlled councils. In 2016, there were ward boundary changes in 25 local authority areas, following the Scottish Government accepting some of the recommendations of Local Government Boundary Commission for Scotland.

The Islands (Scotland) Act 2018 and the Scottish Elections (Reform) Act 2020 have given Boundaries Scotland increased flexibility to vary the size of wards. Mainland wards may now have between 2 and 5 councillors, and single councillor wards are permitted where such a ward includes an inhabited island.

In September 2026 the Scottish Government launched a review into local government in Scotland, based on an initial proposal of 6-10 regions focussed on strategic decision-making, with the regions being subdivided into a total of 120-160 "community authorities" focused on local decision-making.

== Responsibilities ==
- Council Tax
- Non-domestic rates collection
- Maintenance of all roads and pavements (except trunk roads which are the responsibility of Transport Scotland)
- All aspects of education relating to each respective council area; including early years, primary, secondary, additional support needs and school transportation
- The planning system, and Section 75
- Parking
- Bus stops
- Supporting non-commercial bus services
- Provides some Community Transport
- Local authority nurseries and private partnership nursery establishments
- Care of the elderly,
- Protection of vulnerable children and adults
- Refuse collection and disposal
- Licensing of hours of sale for alcohol
- Licensing of cultural music parades
- Licensing of taxis and private hire vehicles
- Licensing of window cleaners, market traders, scrap metal merchants, and street hawkers
- Licensing of sexual entertainment venues
- Food Hygiene inspections
- Regulation of landlords
- Council leisure centres and swimming baths
- Public parks
- Administering the Scottish Welfare Fund

== Map of council areas ==
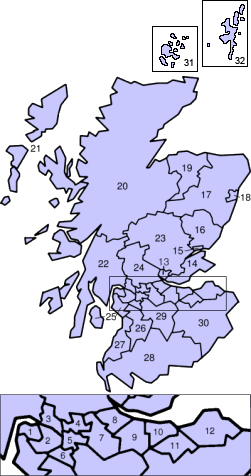

1. Inverclyde
2. Renfrewshire
3. West Dunbartonshire
4. East Dunbartonshire
5. Glasgow City
6. East Renfrewshire
7. North Lanarkshire
8. Falkirk
9. West Lothian
10. City of Edinburgh
11. Midlothian
12. East Lothian
13. Clackmannanshire
14. Fife
15. Dundee City
16. Angus
17. Aberdeenshire
18. Aberdeen City
19. Moray
20. Highland
21. Na h-Eileanan Siar
22. Argyll and Bute
23. Perth and Kinross
24. Stirling
25. North Ayrshire
26. East Ayrshire
27. South Ayrshire
28. Dumfries and Galloway
29. South Lanarkshire
30. Scottish Borders
31. Orkney
32. Shetland

== Governance and administration ==
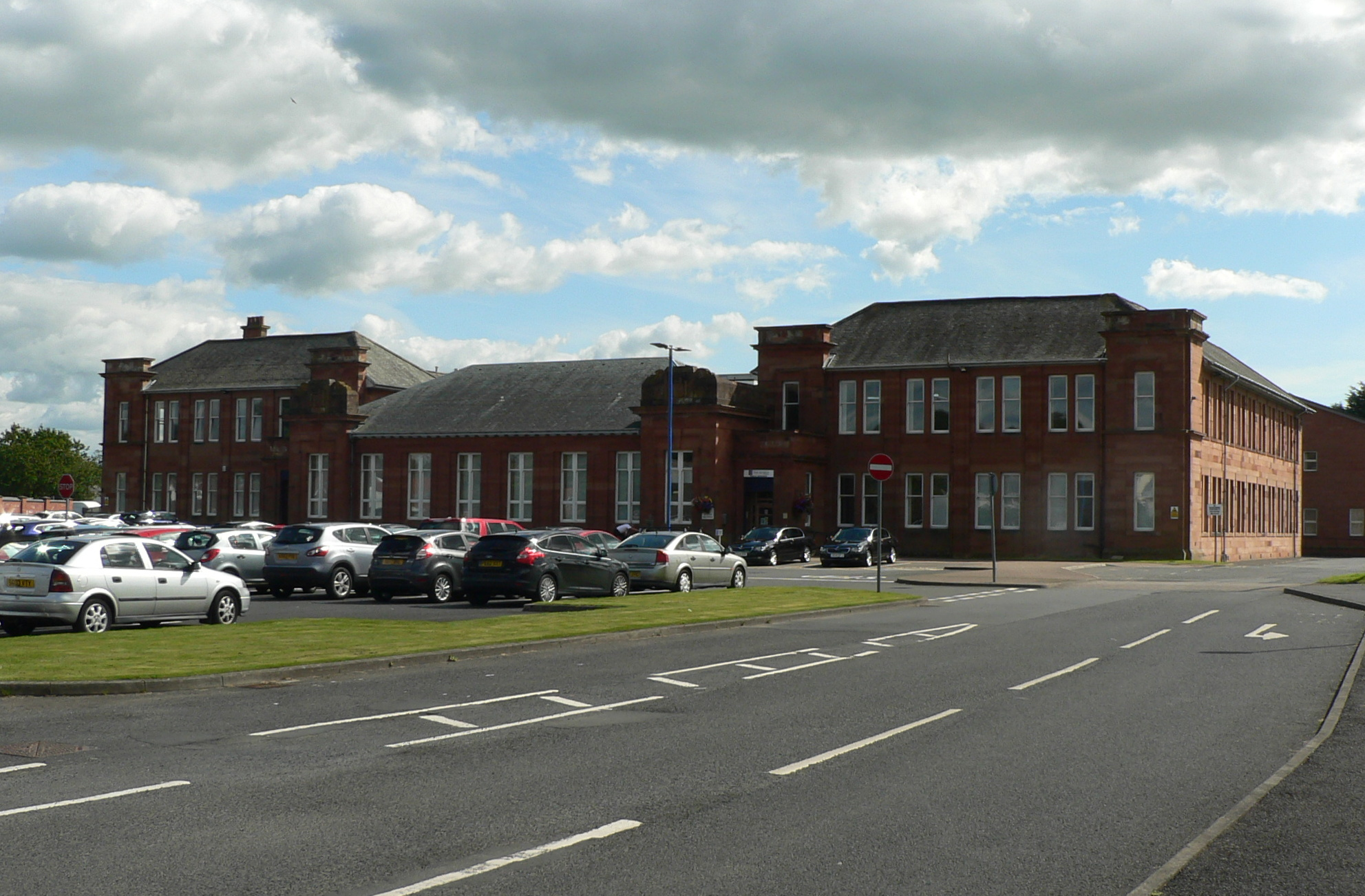
Council headquarters of East Ayrshire Council located in the administrative centre of East Ayrshire, Kilmarnock

The power vested in local authorities is administered by elected councillors. There are currently 1,227 councillors, each paid a part-time salary for the undertaking of their duties. In total, there are 32 unitary authorities, the largest being the Glasgow City with more than 600,000 inhabitants, the smallest, Orkney, with just over 20,000 people living there (population of 21,670 in 2015).

Councillors are subject to a Code of Conduct instituted by the Ethical Standards in Public Life etc. (Scotland) Act 2000 and enforced by the Standards Commission for Scotland. If a person believes that a councillor has broken the code of conduct they make a complaint to the Commissioner for Ethical Standards in Public Life in Scotland (CESPLS). The Commissioner makes a determination on whether there is a need for an investigation, and then whether or not to refer the matter to the Standards Commission.

=== Provost ===
Each council elects a provost from among the members of the council to chair meetings and to act as a figurehead for the area. A council may also elect a depute provost, though this is not required. In the four cities of Glasgow, Edinburgh, Aberdeen and Dundee the provost is called a Lord Provost, whilst in other councils the council may choose another title for their provost or conveners. Most councils use the term 'provost', some use the term 'convener'.

The office of provost or convener is roughly equivalent to that of a mayor in other parts of the United Kingdom. Traditionally these roles are ceremonial and have no significant administrative functions. Lord provosts in the four city councils have the additional duty of acting as Lord Lieutenant for their respective city.

=== Leader of the Council ===
Since 2007 each council has been required to designate a "leader of the council" and a "civic head", who receive additional remuneration for holding those roles. The regulations direct that unless a council decides otherwise the leader is the convener and the civic head is the depute convener. In practice, most authorities appoint someone other than the convener as leader of the council, such that the political leader of the council is not also presiding over the debate at council meetings. The convener or provost usually takes the civic head role. The leader of the council is usually the leader of the largest political group, or in a coalition the leader of the largest party in that coalition. The Leader of the Council has no executive or administrative powers designated by statute. Prior to 2007 many authorities recognised the leader of the largest political group or coalition administration as being leader of the council, but there was no legislative basis for the role.

=== Officers ===
Officers of a council are administrative, non-political staff of the council. Generally the composition of the council's officers are a matter for the council, but there are a number of statutory officers whose roles are defined by the central government.

The most significant of these officers is the Head of Paid Service, usually titled the Chief Executive. The Chief Executive is similar in function to a city manager, though certain councillors have executive authority and there is no clear division of powers.

There is also a statutory Monitoring Officer, who usually heads the Legal Services division of the council, as well as a Chief Financial Officer.

== 2022 election results ==
Summary of the May 2022 Scottish council election results
Party	First-preference votes			Councils		2017 seats		2022 seats		
Party	Count	Of total (%)	Change	Count	Change	Count	Of total (%)	Count	Of total (%)	Change
No overall control	—N/a			27	▼2	—N/a		—N/a		
SNP	633,252	34.1%	▲1.8%	1	▲1	431	35.1%	453	36.9%	▲22
Labour	403,243	21.7%	▲1.6%	1	▲1	262	21.4%	282	23.0%	▲20
Conservative	364,824	19.6%	▼5.7%	0	Steady	276	22.5%	214	17.5%	▼62
Liberal Democrats	159,815	8.6%	▲1.7%	0	Steady	67	5.5%	87	7.1%	▲20
Independents	156,815	8.4%	▼2.0%	3	Steady	168	13.7%	152	12.4%	▼15
Green	110,791	6.0%	▲1.9%	0	Steady	19	1.6%	35	2.9%	▲16
Alba	12,335	0.7%		0	Steady				0.0%	New
Scottish Family	6,857	0.4%		0	Steady				0.0%	New
West Dunbartonshire Community	1,462	0.1%		0	Steady			1	0.1%	Steady
Scottish Socialist	1,058	0.1%	▲0.1%	0	Steady				0.0%	Steady
TUSC	1,022	0.1%		0	Steady				0.0%	Steady
British Unionist	859	0.1%		0	Steady			1	0.1%	▲1
Rubbish	787	0.0%		0	Steady			1	0.1%	Steady
Independence for Scotland	742	0.0%		0	Steady				0.0%	New
Libertarian	698	0.0%		0	Steady				0.0%	Steady
Freedom Alliance	555	0.0%		0	Steady				0.0%	New
Volt UK	421	0.0%		0	Steady				0.0%	New
Socialist Labour	381	0.0%		0	Steady				0.0%	Steady
UKIP	372	0.0%	▼0.2%	0	Steady				0.0%	Steady
Women's Equality	228	0.0%		0	Steady				0.0%	New
Social Democratic	222	0.0%		0	Steady				0.0%	Steady
Sovereignty	154	0.0%		0	Steady				0.0%	New
Communist	119	0.0%		0	Steady				0.0%	New
Pensioner's	75	0.0%		0	Steady				0.0%	New
Vanguard	74	0.0%		0	Steady				0.0%	New
Workers	61	0.0%		0	Steady				0.0%	New
Scottish Eco-Federalist	24	0.0%		0	Steady				0.0%	New
Total	1,889,658	100.0	±0.0	32	Steady	1,223	1,227	1,226	100.00	Steady

=== Council control ===
Last updated 25 February 2026.

Council	Control		Web
Aberdeen City	NOC	SNP-LD coalition	URL
Aberdeenshire	NOC	Con-LD-ind. coalition	URL
Angus	NOC	Con-ind.-Lab minority	URL
Argyll & Bute	NOC	SNP-LD-Grn-Lab-ind. coalition	URL
Clackmannanshire	NOC	SNP minority	URL
Dumfries & Galloway	NOC	SNP minority	URL
Dundee City	SNP	Majority	URL
East Ayrshire	NOC	SNP minority	URL
East Dunbartonshire	NOC	SNP minority	URL
East Lothian	NOC	Lab minority	URL
East Renfrewshire	NOC	Lab-ind. minority	URL
City of Edinburgh	NOC	Lab minority	URL
Falkirk	NOC	SNP minority	URL
Fife	NOC	Lab minority	URL
Glasgow City	NOC	SNP minority	URL
Highland	NOC	SNP-ind. coalition	URL
Inverclyde	NOC	Lab minority	URL
Midlothian	NOC	SNP minority	URL
Moray	NOC	Con minority	URL
Na h-Eileanan Siar	Ind	Majority	URL
North Ayrshire	NOC	SNP minority	URL
North Lanarkshire	NOC	Lab minority	URL
Orkney	Ind.	Ind-Grn coalition	URL
Perth & Kinross	NOC	SNP minority	URL
Renfrewshire	NOC	SNP minority	URL
Scottish Borders	NOC	Con-ind. coalition	URL
Shetland	Ind.	Majority	URL
South Ayrshire	NOC	Ind minority	URL
South Lanarkshire	NOC	Lab-LD-ind. minority	URL
Stirling	NOC	SNP-Grn-ind coalition	URL
West Dunbartonshire	NOC	Lab minority	URL
West Lothian	NOC	Lab minority	URL

== 2017 election results ==
Following boundary changes:

Summary of the 3 May 2017 Scottish council election results
Party	First-preference votes			Councils	+/-	2012 seats		2017 seats		Seat change
Party	First-preference votes			Councils	+/-	Seats won	Notional	Seats won	Seat %	vs Notional
Scottish National Party	610,454	32.3%	0.0	0	▼1	425	438	431	35.1%	▼7
Conservative	478,073	25.3%	▲12.0%	0	Steady	115	112	276	22.5%	▲164
Labour	380,957	20.2%	▼11.4%	0	▼3	394	395	262	21.4%	▼133
Independents	199,261	10.5%	▼1.3%	3	Steady	196	198	172	14.1%	▼26
Liberal Democrats	128,821	6.8%	▲0.2%	0	Steady	71	70	67	5.5%	▼3
Scottish Greens	77,682	4.1%	▲1.8%	0	Steady	14	14	19	1.6%	▲5
No Overall Control	—	—	—	29	▲4	—	—	—	—	—
Total	1,889,658	100.0	±0.0	32	Steady	1,223	1,227	1,227	100.00	Steady

Note: There were boundary changes in many of these councils. Notional seats and seat change are based on a notional 2012 result calculated by the BBC. The methodology was officially revealed on 9 May 2017. The relevant explanation is available on the BBC Website. Comparisons with the actual results from 2012 are inconsistent, as the number of seats and seat changes will be different because of an increase in council seats across the country from 1,223 to 1,227 and the different boundaries.

The BBC notional calculation is as follows:
Party	2012 seats	2012 notional
Scottish National Party	425	438
Conservative	115	112
Labour	394	395
Liberal Democrats	71	70
Scottish Greens	14	14
Others	204	198
Total	1,223	1,227

=== Council control ===
Political control may be held by minority governments (min), coalitions (co), joint leadership arrangements (j.l.) or partnership working arrangements (p.w.).

Last update 13 February 2022.

Council	Control		Web	Total	SNP	CON	LAB	LD	SGP	Alba	Other	Vacant	Upcoming by-elections
Aberdeen City	NOC	CON+ALAB (Note: 9 Aberdeen Labour (Councillors suspended by Labour from party for their coalition with Conservatives).)+IND co	URL	45	19	10	9	3			4		
Aberdeenshire	NOC	CON+LD+IND co	URL	70	19	20	1	13	1	3	16		
Angus	NOC	CON+IND+LD co	URL	28	9	8		1			10		
Argyll & Bute	NOC	CON+LD+IND+ISP co	URL	36	11	8		5			11	1	
Clackmannanshire	NOC	SNP min	URL	18	7	5	4				1	1	
Dumfries & Galloway	NOC	LAB+SNP co	URL	43	10	16	10	1			6		
Dundee City	NOC	SNP min	URL	29	13	3	8	2			3		
East Ayrshire	NOC	SNP min	URL	32	14	6	9				3		
East Dunbartonshire	NOC	LD+CON co	URL	22	7	5	2	6			1	1	
East Lothian	NOC	LAB min	URL	22	6	7	9						
East Renfrewshire	NOC	SNP+LAB co	URL	18	5	5	4				4		
City of Edinburgh	NOC	SNP+LAB co	URL	63	16	17	11	6	7		5	1	
Falkirk	NOC	SNP+IND co	URL	30	13	7	7				3		
Fife	NOC	SNP+LAB j.l.	URL	75	29	13	23	7			2	1	
Glasgow City	NOC	SNP min	URL	85	35	7	30		6	2	5		
Highland	NOC	IND+LD+LAB co	URL	74	19	10	3	11	1		29	1	
Inverclyde	NOC	LAB min	URL	22	5	2	8	1		2	4		
Midlothian	NOC	LAB min	URL	18	7	5	6						
Moray	NOC	SNP min	URL	26	7	9	1				8	1	
Na h-Eileanan Siar	IND	IND	URL	31	6	1			1	1	22		
North Ayrshire	NOC	LAB min	URL	33	9	8	11				5		
North Lanarkshire	NOC	LAB min	URL	77	26	8	31			3	9		
Orkney	IND	IND	URL	21					2		19		
Perth & Kinross	NOC	CON min	URL	40	13	18	1	5			3		
Renfrewshire	NOC	SNP min	URL	43	19	8	13	1			2		
Scottish Borders	NOC	CON+IND co	URL	34	8	15		2			9		
Shetland	IND	IND	URL	22	1						21		
South Ayrshire	NOC	SNP+LAB+IND p.w.	URL	28	9	12	5				2		
South Lanarkshire	NOC	SNP min	URL	64	25	11	17	3			8		
Stirling	NOC	SNP+LAB	URL	23	7	9	4		1	1	1		
West Dunbartonshire	NOC	SNP+IND	URL	22	9	2	8			1	2		
West Lothian	NOC	LAB min	URL	33	14	7	11				1		

== 2012 election results ==
=== Council control ===
The 32 unitary authorities were controlled as follows. The figures incorporate the results from the 2012 local government election, plus gains and losses from subsequent local by-elections, and party defections.

Council	Political control	Lab	SNP	LD	Con	Grn	Ind/Oth	Total
Aberdeen City	Lab-Con-Ind	17	16	5	2	0	3	43
Aberdeenshire	Conservative/Liberal Coalition	2	26	10	16	1	13	68
Angus	SNP (minority)	1	14	1	4	0	9	29
Argyll and Bute	Ind-LD-Con	1	8	4	3	0	20	36
Clackmannanshire	Lab (minority)	8	9	0	1	0	0	18
Dumfries and Galloway	Lab-Ind (minority)	13	9	1	9	0	15	47
Dundee City	SNP	10	16	1	1	0	1	29
East Ayrshire	SNP-Con	14	15	0	2	0	1	32
East Dunbartonshire	Lab-Con-LD	9	8	3	2	0	2	24
East Lothian	Lab-Con-Ind	10	8	0	3	0	2	23
East Renfrewshire	Lab-SNP	8	4	0	6	0	2	20
City of Edinburgh	Lab-SNP	21	17	2	11	5	2	58
Comhairle nan Eilean Siar (Outer Hebrides)	Ind	2	4	0	0	0	25	31
Falkirk	Lab-Ind-Con	14	13	0	2	0	3	32
Fife	Lab (minority)	33	26	10	3	0	6	78
Glasgow City	Lab	40	30	1	1	4	2	78
Highland	SNP-Lab	7	17	13	0	0	42	80
Inverclyde	Lab (minority)	9	6	2	1	0	2	20
Midlothian	SNP-Ind (minority)	8	8	0	0	1	1	18
Moray	Ind-Con	2	11	0	3	0	10	26
North Ayrshire	Lab (minority)	12	11	0	1	0	6	30
North Lanarkshire	Lab (minority)	31	22	0	0	0	17	70
Orkney	Ind	0	0	0	0	0	21	21
Perth and Kinross	SNP (minority)	4	18	5	11	0	3	41
Renfrewshire	Lab	20	16	1	1	0	2	40
Scottish Borders	Ind-SNP-LD	0	8	6	9	0	11	34
Shetland	Ind	0	0	0	0	0	22	22
South Ayrshire	Con-Lab	9	9	0	10	0	2	30
South Lanarkshire	Lab	38	21	1	3	0	4	67
Stirling	Lab-Con	8	9	0	4	1	0	22
West Dunbartonshire	Lab	38	21	1	3	0	4	22
West Lothian	Lab (minority)	16	15	0	1	0	1	32
TOTAL	-	379	401	66	110	12	254	1222

== 2007 election results ==
Following the introduction of the Local Governance (Scotland) Act 2004 local elections are held using the single transferable vote, with this taking place for the first time in 2007. This change in voting system saw all but five councils end up with no one party in control. Labour retained control of Glasgow City and North Lanarkshire, while Orkney, Shetland and Na h-Eileanan Siar continue to be controlled by Independent councillors.

=== Council control ===
The 32 unitary authorities are controlled as follows. The figures incorporate the results from the 2007 local government election, plus gains and losses from subsequent local by-elections, and party defections.

Council	Political control	Lab	SNP	LD	Con	Grn	Oth	Total
Aberdeen City	LD-SNP	10	13	15	4	0	1	43
Aberdeenshire	SNP	2	28	12	14	1	11	68
Angus	Con-LD-Lab-Oth	2	13	3	5	0	6	29
Argyll and Bute	Oth-LD-Con	0	10	8	3	0	15	36
Clackmannanshire	Lab (minority)	8	8	0	1	0	1	18
Dumfries and Galloway	Con-LD (minority)	14	10	3	18	0	2	47
Dundee City	SNP (minority)	8	14	2	3	0	2	29
East Ayrshire	SNP (minority)	14	14	0	3	0	1	32
East Dunbartonshire	Con-Lab (minority)	6	8	3	5	0	2	24
East Lothian	SNP-LD	7	7	6	2	0	1	23
East Renfrewshire	Lab-SNP-Oth-LD	7	3	1	7	0	2	20
City of Edinburgh	LD-SNP	15	12	17	11	3	0	58
Comhairle nan Eilean Siar (Outer Hebrides)	Ind	2	4	0	0	0	25	31
Falkirk	Lab-Oth-Con	14	13	0	2	0	3	32
Fife	SNP-LD	24	23	21	5	0	5	78
Glasgow City	Lab	46	22	5	1	5	0	79
Highland	Oth-LD-Lab	7	18	21	0	0	34	80
Inverclyde	Lab-Con-Oth	9	5	4	1	0	1	20
Midlothian	Lab (minority)	9	6	3	0	0	0	18
Moray	Oth-Con	2	9	0	3	0	12	26
North Ayrshire	Lab (minority)	12	8	2	3	0	5	30
North Lanarkshire	Lab	40	23	1	1	0	5	70
Orkney	Oth	0	0	0	0	0	21	21
Perth and Kinross	SNP-LD	3	18	8	12	0	0	41
Renfrewshire	SNP-LD	17	17	4	2	0	0	40
Scottish Borders	Oth-Con-LD	0	6	10	11	0	7	34
Shetland	Oth	0	0	0	0	0	22	22
South Ayrshire	Con (minority)	9	8	0	12	0	1	30
South Lanarkshire	Lab-Con-LD	30	24	2	8	0	3	67
Stirling	Lab-Con	8	9	0	4	0	1	22
West Dunbartonshire	SNP-Oth	10	9	0	0	0	3	22
West Lothian	SNP-Oth	14	13	0	1	0	4	32
TOTAL	-	348	363	166	143	8	194	1222

== Community councils ==
Community councils represent the interests of local people. Local authorities have a statutory duty to consult community councils on planning, development and other issues directly affecting that local community. However, the community council has no direct say in the delivery of services. In many areas they do not function at all, but some work very effectively at improving their local area. Elections for community councils are determined by the local authority but the law does state that candidates cannot stand on a party-political ticket.

== See also ==
- 2022 Scottish local elections
- List of political parties in Scotland
- Subdivisions of Scotland
- Local government in England
- Local government in Northern Ireland
- Local government in Wales
- Business rates in Scotland
- Local income tax
- Convention of Scottish Local Authorities
- Scottish Housing Regulator
- Social care in Scotland
- List of Scottish council areas by population
