= Clydebank Waterfront (ward) =

Electoral ward in West Dunbartonshire, Scotland

Location of the ward

Clydebank Waterfront is one of the six wards used to elect members of the West Dunbartonshire Council. It elects four Councillors.

The ward covers southern parts of the town of Clydebank close to the River Clyde including part of the town centre, namely the areas south of the Forth and Clyde Canal around Chalmers Street and Glasgow Road (with the bus station and Clydebank railway station), while everything north of the canal at that point is within the Clydebank Central ward. West of Boquhanran Road tunnel, the boundary between the wards changes from the canal to the Argyle Line / North Clyde Line railway tracks. Residential neighbourhoods in the ward include Clydeholm, Dalmuir, South Mountblow (Clydemuir), Whitecrook and all parts of the adjoining settlement of Old Kilpatrick.

== Councillors ==
Election	Councillors			
2007	Gail Casey (Labour)	Marie McNair (Labour /Ind. /SNP)	William Hendrie (SNP)	Jim McElhill (SNP)
2012	Gail Casey (Labour)	Marie McNair (Labour /Ind. /SNP)	William Hendrie (SNP)	Kath Ryall (Labour)
2017	Gail Casey (Labour)	Marie McNair (Labour /Ind. /SNP)	William Hendrie (SNP)	Daniel Lennie (Labour)
2022	June McKay (Labour /Ind.)	James McElhill (SNP)	Lauren Oxley (SNP)	Daniel Lennie (Labour)
2025	June McKay (Labour /Ind.)	Kevin Crawford (SNP)	Lauren Oxley (SNP)	Daniel Lennie (Labour)

== Election results ==
=== Clydebank Waterfront by-election ===
Clydebank Waterfront by-election (15 May 2025) - 1 seat
Party	Candidate	FPv%	Count						
Party	Candidate	FPv%	1	2	3	4	5	6	7
SNP	Kevin Crawford	35.6	1039	1042	1061	1095	1098	1123	1331
Reform	David Smith	26.3	768	772	780	782	808	840	919
Labour	Maureen McGlinchey	25.3	739	742	745	759	770	822	
Scottish Liberal Democrats	Cameron Eoin Stewart	4.7	138	138	138	154	167		
Conservative	Brian Walker	2.9	84	85	85	87			
Green	Eryn Browning	2.6	76	77	83				
Alba	Kristopher Duncan	1.6	47	51					
Scottish Family	Andrew Muir	0.9	25						
Electorate: 11,657 Valid: 2,916 Spoilt: 38 Turnout: 25.3%

During the campaign Eryn Browning was suspended from the Greens; however, as this happened after the deadline to remove her as a candidate, she still appeared on the ballot paper.

=== 2022 election ===
2022 West Dunbartonshire Council election

Clydebank Waterfront - 4 seats
Party	Candidate	FPv%	Count					
Party	Candidate	FPv%	1	2	3	4	5	6
SNP	James McElhill	31.8	1,493					
Labour	Daniel Lennie (incumbent)	25.9	1,217					
SNP	Lauren Oxley	16.3	767	1,179.9				
Labour	June McKay	11.5	540	571.5	811.4	822.1	868	1,093.5
Conservative	Holly Moscrop	7.7	362	367.2	374.2	376.6	403.9	
SNP	Jacob Toland	4.2	196	255.3	259.5	475.1	493.2	500.8
Scottish Family	Brian Michael Lally	2.6	121	125.4	129.5	130.6		
Electorate: 11,537 Valid: 4,696 Spoilt: 158 Quota: 940 Turnout: 42.1%

=== 2017 election ===
2017 West Dunbartonshire Council election

Clydebank Waterfront - 4 seats
Party	Candidate	FPv%	Count								
Party	Candidate	FPv%	1	2	3	4	5	6	7	8	9
SNP	William Hendrie (incumbent)	29.6	1,487								
Labour	Gail Casey (incumbent)	25.9	1,298								
SNP	Marie McNair (incumbent)	12.0	601	933.9	945.3	947.3	966.2	1,051.9			
Conservative	David Jardine	10.6	531	534.9	546.2	548.2	560.2	597.0	597.5	612.3	
SNP	Frank McNiff	7.0	350	438.3	439.7	443.7	455.5	494.0	533.7		
Independent	Joe Henry	5.8	292	310.5	327.3	343.3	423.3				
Labour	Daniel Lennie	5.4	271	285.0	503.8	507.2	523.2	595.4	597.4	737.4	951.9
Independent	Locky Cameron	2.9	146	151.8	158.4	165.4					
Independent	Brian Murray	0.8	42	42.0	42.5						
Electorate: 11,689 Valid: 5,018 Spoilt: 171 Quota: 1,004 Turnout: 44.4

=== 2012 election ===
2012 West Dunbartonshire Council election

Clydebank Waterfront - 4 seats
Party	Candidate	FPv%	Count						
Party	Candidate	FPv%	1	2	3	4	5	6	7
Labour	Gail Casey (incumbent)	33.55	1,473						
SNP	William Hendrie (incumbent)	24.05	1,056						
Independent	Marie McNair (incumbent)†	16.24	713	777.1	785.2	796.6	809.8	842.8	901.5
Labour	Kath Ryall	11.87	521	929.9					
SNP	Jim McElhill (incumbent)	9.18	403	435.7	583.7	590.9	598.9	619.8	636.9
Conservative	Linda Kinniburgh	2.66	117	128.3	130.3	131.9	139.1	142.6	
Scottish Socialist	Ann Lynch	1.57	69	83.5	86.9	89.7	89.9		
Scottish Christian	Alastair Manderson	0.89	39	43	44.9	45.9			
Electorate: 11,451 Valid: 4,391 Spoilt: 108 Quota: 879 Turnout: 4,499 (39.29%)

=== 2007 election ===
2007 West Dunbartonshire Council election

West Dunbartonshire Council election, 2007: Clydebank Waterfront
Party	Candidate	FPv%	%	Seat	Count
Labour	Gail Casey	1,922	32.0		
SNP	William Hendrie	1,435	23.9		
SNP	Jim McElhill	585	9.7		
Labour	Marie McNair†	537	8.9		
Independent	Dennis Brogan	407	6.8		
A Strong Voice for Clydebank	Jackie Maceira	378	6.3		
Conservative	Terry Stables	277	4.6		
Independent	Joe Brady	266	4.4		
Scottish Socialist	Dawn Fyfe	198	3.3		
