= Bonhill =

Coordinates: 55.983°N 4.567°W

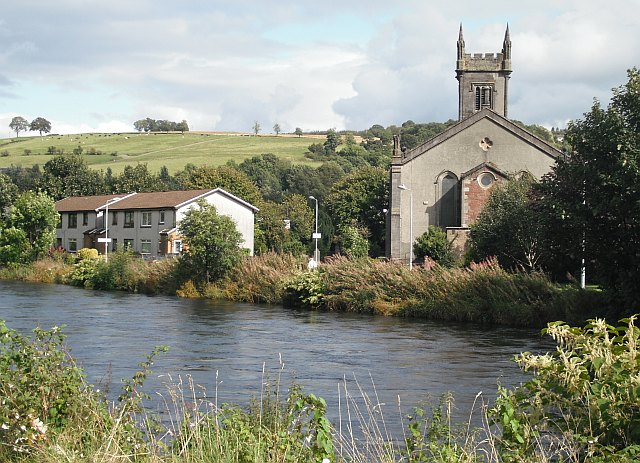
- Bonhill parish church, across the River Leven

- Location within West Dunbartonshire
- Population: 9,060 (2020)
- OS grid reference: NS4079
- Civil parish: Bonhill
- Council area: West Dunbartonshire
- Lieutenancy area: Dunbartonshire
- Country: Scotland
- Sovereign state: United Kingdom
- Post town: ALEXANDRIA
- Postcode district: G83
- Dialling code: 01389
- Police: Scotland
- Fire: Scottish
- Ambulance: Scottish
- UK Parliament: West Dunbartonshire
- Scottish Parliament: Dumbarton

Bonhill is a town in the Vale of Leven area of West Dunbartonshire, Scotland. It is sited on the Eastern bank of the River Leven, on the opposite bank from the larger town of Alexandria.

== History ==
The area is mentioned in a charter of 1225 giving the monks from Paisley Abbey fishing rights on the east bank of the River Leven at the Linbrane pool. Bonhill Parish was noted in a charter of 1270 as "the parish of Buthehille", and the name became Bonyle about 1550, with the variants Binnuill, Bonuil and Bonill appearing before Bonhill was adopted by 1700. In 1650 this small poor parish was enlarged, and since then the Parish has included most of the towns and villages in the Vale of Leven.

The village of Bonhill itself featured an early church, and a ford across the River Leven on the drovers' road to Glasgow. The first modern church was built close to the river in 1747, and it was replaced in 1835 by the present Church of Scotland building on the site of an earlier small church. Various churches of other denominations were constructed from 1830, but closed in the 1960s.

The textile finishing industry came to Bonhill with a printworks, the Dalmonach Works which started in 1786. It burnt down in 1812, and was rebuilt by Henry Bell. A second textile works opened in 1793, and two more works had begun by 1840. Some closed shortly afterwards, but one lasted to 1936. The Dalmonach Works itself featured a school outside the main gates, serving children from the area as well as children employed in the works. After the works closed in 1929, its buildings were used an army barracks during World War II, and subsequently occupied by various smaller companies before the buildings were demolished in 2006, leaving only the school which remains as a listed building.

The town rapidly expanded in the 1960s and 1970s when many residents of Glasgow were moved to "New Bonhill" built on green field sites aimed at facilitating economic expansion and assisting with the removal of below-standard Glasgow housing. This process was known as the "Glasgow overspill". The new houses were built by Dumbarton District Council and the now defunct Scottish Special Housing Association (SSHA). Many think that the scale of the new estates was too large and monolithic in terms of tenure. Originally fairly prosperous (SSHA provided houses for workers in order to assist the economy), the industrial decline that hit the Alexandria area hard led to high levels of unemployment and the social ills that often follow that.

The new Bonhill estates were built quite high up on the hill providing magnificent views up the valley to Loch Lomond. Amenities were planned and built, schools, library, shops, a pub, take away etc. Bus routes were introduced but the houses felt remote from Alexandria centre (a town lacking basic amenities itself).

The Council housing was provided with a district heating system using a single power plant. The system had a set charge collected with rent rather than being metered the aim being to ensure nobody suffered from fuel poverty. Unfortunately this was very badly engineered, used poor material and suffered from vast leakages. The system became uneconomic because of the many breakdowns and the communal plant was removed and individual gas boilers installed.

The New Bonhill estates suffered from vandalism, however demolition of the tenement flats and the introduction of mixed tenure has mitigated this somewhat.

The largest employers for Bonhill residents are Faslane/Coulport submarine bases and West Dunbartonshire Council. Bonhill and the wider West Dumbartonshire area is essentially now commuter belt for Glasgow. The nearest town is Dumbarton, two miles (three kilometres) away.

According to the 2011 census, Bonhill's population had declined slightly to 9,360.
