= Kilpatrick (ward) =

Electoral ward in West Dunbartonshire, Scotland

Location of the ward

Kilpatrick is one of the six wards used to elect members of the West Dunbartonshire Council. It elects three Councillors.

The ward covers the northern outskirts of Clydebank, namely the adjoining suburban villages of Duntocher, Faifley and Hardgate.

== Councillors ==
Election	Councillors		
2007	Jim Finn (SNP)	Margaret Bootland (Labour)	Douglas McAllister (Labour)
2012	Jim Finn (SNP)	Lawrence O'Neill (Labour)	Douglas McAllister (Labour)
2017	Jim Finn (SNP)	Lawrence O'Neill (Labour)	Douglas McAllister (Labour)
2022	Gordon Scanlan (SNP)	Lawrence O'Neill (Labour)	Douglas McAllister (Labour)
2024 by-election	Gordon Scanlan (SNP)	Lawrence O'Neill (Labour)	William Rooney (Labour)

== Election results ==
=== 2024 by-election ===
In September 2024 Labour councillor and newly elected Member of Parliament Douglas McAllister resigned as a councillor. A by-election was held in the Kilpatrick ward on 28 November 2024.

Kilpatrick by-election (28 November 2024) - 1 seat
Party	Candidate	FPv%	Count					
Party	Candidate	FPv%	1	2	3	4	5	6
Labour	William Rooney	42.75	725	731	736	753	782	814
SNP	Marina Scanlan	30.31	514	514	518	523	559	564
Reform UK	David Haydn Smith	10.38	176	178	184	186	191	200
Conservative	Ewan McGinnigle	5.72	97	97	97	102	103	
Scottish Green	Paula Baker	4.30	73	83	84	95		
Scottish Liberal Democrats	Kai O'Connor	3.71	63	64	66			
Scottish Family	Andrew Muir	1.47	25	25				
Communist	Dylan McAllister	1.36	23					
Electorate: 8,879 Valid: 1,696 Spoilt: 9 Quota: 849 Turnout: 19.2%

=== 2022 election ===
2022 West Dunbartonshire Council election

Kilpatrick - 3 seats
Party	Candidate	FPv%	Count	
Party	Candidate	FPv%	1	2
Labour	Douglas McAllister (incumbent)	49.1	1,903	
SNP	Gordon Scanlan	25.4	986	
SNP	Marina Scanlan	12.5	486	524.2
Labour	Lawrence O'Neill (incumbent)	7.0	272	1,020.6
Conservative	David Jardine	5.9	229	269.7
Electorate: 8,987 Valid: 4,059 Spoilt: 183 Quota: 970 Turnout: 45.2%

=== 2017 election ===
2017 West Dunbartonshire Council election

Kilpatrick - 3 seats
Party	Candidate	FPv%	Count				
Party	Candidate	FPv%	1	2	3	4	5
Labour	Douglas McAllister (incumbent)	40.7	1,704				
SNP	Jim Finn (incumbent)	23.1	965	1,000.9	1,019.5	1,023.2	1,738.6
SNP	Claire Gallagher	19.1	800	827.4	838.6	842.7	
Labour	Lawrence O'Neill (incumbent)	8.8	367	886.4	1,071.4		
Conservative	Hermione Spencer	8.2	346	369.2			
Electorate: 9,052 Valid: 4,182 Spoilt: 161 Quota: 1,046 Turnout: 48.0

=== 2012 election ===
2012 West Dunbartonshire Council election

Kilpatrick - 3 seats
Party	Candidate	FPv%	Count					
Party	Candidate	FPv%	1	2	3	4	5	6
Labour	Douglas McAllister (incumbent)	48.01	1,717					
SNP	Jim Finn (incumbent)	21.11	755	785.2	811.4	823.7	839.6	1,110.5
Labour	Lawrence O'Neill (incumbent)	11.19	400	1,113.8				
SNP	Ian Dickson	7.96	285	291.2	301.4	305.5	324.4	
Independent	Walter Graham	7.27	260	284.9	321.9	336.8	388.8	408.2
Conservative	Douglas Boyle	3.38	121	125.8	134.7	135.1		
Scottish Socialist	Dawn Fyfe	1.06	38	41.8	53.8			
Electorate: 9,004 Valid: 3,576 Spoilt: 86 Quota: 895 Turnout: 3,662 (40.67%)

=== 2007 election ===
2007 West Dunbartonshire Council election

West Dunbartonshire Council election, 2007: Kilpatrick
Party	Candidate	FPv%	%	Seat	Count
Labour	Douglas McAllister	1,356	29.8		
Labour	Margaret Bootland	1,188	26.1		
SNP	Jim Finn	1,092	24.0		
SNP	Frank McNiff	403	8.8		
Conservative	Douglas John Boyle	378	8.3		
Scottish Socialist	Cammy Fyfe	138	3.0		
