= Jim Bollan =

Scottish politician

Councillor Jim Bollan

Councillor, West Dunbartonshire Council
- Incumbent
- Assumed office 3 May 2007 Serving with Cllrs Ian Dickson, Caroline McAllister, John Millar
- Constituency: Leven
- In office 6 May 1999 – 2 May 2007
- Constituency: Renton and Alexandria South

Personal details
- Party: West Dunbartonshire Community Party (since 2016)
- Other political affiliations: Scottish Socialist Party (2000–2016); Independent (1995–2000); Scottish Labour Party (1980s–1995); Communist Party of Great Britain (until 1980s)

Jim Bollan (born c. 1950) is a councillor in West Dunbartonshire, representing the West Dunbartonshire Community Party. Until 2016 he was a member of the Scottish Socialist Party (SSP), having been the only elected representative from that party left in Scotland.

== Political career ==
Bollan, at one time a member of the Communist Party of Great Britain, was elected as a Labour councillor for Renton and Alexandria South ward in 1988, later becoming the party group leader on Dumbarton District Council. He was elected as an Independent representative on West Dunbartonshire Council in the 1999 local elections, defeating Labour and Scottish National Party (SNP) opponents. He went on to join the SSP and was re-elected in 2003, defeating an SNP opponent.

Bollan has not been a prominent figure in the SSP at a national level, but he has been involved in the campaign against conditions in Cornton Vale women's prison, as his daughter was one of a number of women prisoners who have committed suicide there. He has been an opponent of the Trident programme for many years and has taken part in many protests against their presence at the Faslane base, including those organised by Faslane Peace Camp.

In May 2009, he was suspended from the council for nine months for alleged misconduct after he was refused permission to address the council on changes to workers' terms and conditions imposed by the new single status arrangement, describing the manner in which the council drove through changes as "shite" and "a stitch up". His suspension was protested by Socialist Resistance and the Secretary of Clydebank Trades Council, Tom Morrison.

Bollan was selected as the no. 1 candidate for the SSP in the West Scotland region for the 2011 Scottish Parliament election, but failed to win the seat. In the 2012 local elections, he was re-elected fairly comfortably as a councillor, coming second and winning on the first count.

In November 2013, Bollan resigned from the GMB in protest of its "dictatorial and undemocratic" decision to campaign against Scottish independence.

In February 2015, Bollan announced that he intended to stand down at the next council election in 2017. He told the Dumbarton and Vale of Leven Reporter: "I don't believe you should go on and on in these elected positions forever. Come the elections in 2017 I will have been a councillor for 28 years and I believe this is a sufficient amount of time to have been in that role." After his announcement, messages of support flooded in on social media. However, in August 2016 he decided to stand again in the 2017 local elections for the West Dunbartonshire Community Party, which he had formed with fellow councillor George Black. He was once again re-elected in Leven ward, coming in second place with 22% of the vote.
