= West Dunbartonshire Community Party =

Scottish political party

- Leader: Drew MacEoghainn
- Founded: 19 May 2016; 9 years ago
- Headquarters: Alexandria, West Dunbartonshire
- Ideology: Socialism
- Political position: Left-wing
- Colours: Purple
- West Dunbartonshire Council: 1 / 22

The West Dunbartonshire Community Party is a minor left-wing political party involved in local government elections in West Dunbartonshire, Scotland. The party was formed in 2016 to contest the 2017 West Dunbartonshire Council election.

== History ==
In 2016, the party was founded by Drew MacEoghainn along with other community activists. It was decided that the party should have no leader giving an equal say to all members. The Scottish Socialist Party's only elected representative, Councillor Jim Bollan, and his independent colleague, Councillor George Black, joined the party. The two councillors retained their existing designations until the council was dissolved in early 2017 in preparation for the election that May.

In the election, only Bollan was elected to represent the party, with Black losing his seat in Dumbarton ward.

In March 2021, the party was deregistered from the Electoral Commission's Register of Political Parties; it was reregistered that May.

Bollan retained his seat in the 2022 election.

== Policies ==
The party has been described as left-wing. Its policy platform includes:

- Support for nationalisation of public transport and other public services
- Opposition to education budget cuts
- Support for a unionised workforce
- Opposition to nuclear weapons
- Support for a fully funded health service.
- A plan to ensure that council houses make up at least 25% of houses on new developments

The party also says that most of its members support Scottish independence but they are "granted freedom to both express and back whatever view on Scottish Independence they so choose".

The party opposes plans to build a Flamingo Land resort on Loch Lomond.
