= Douglas McAllister =

Scottish Labour Party politician

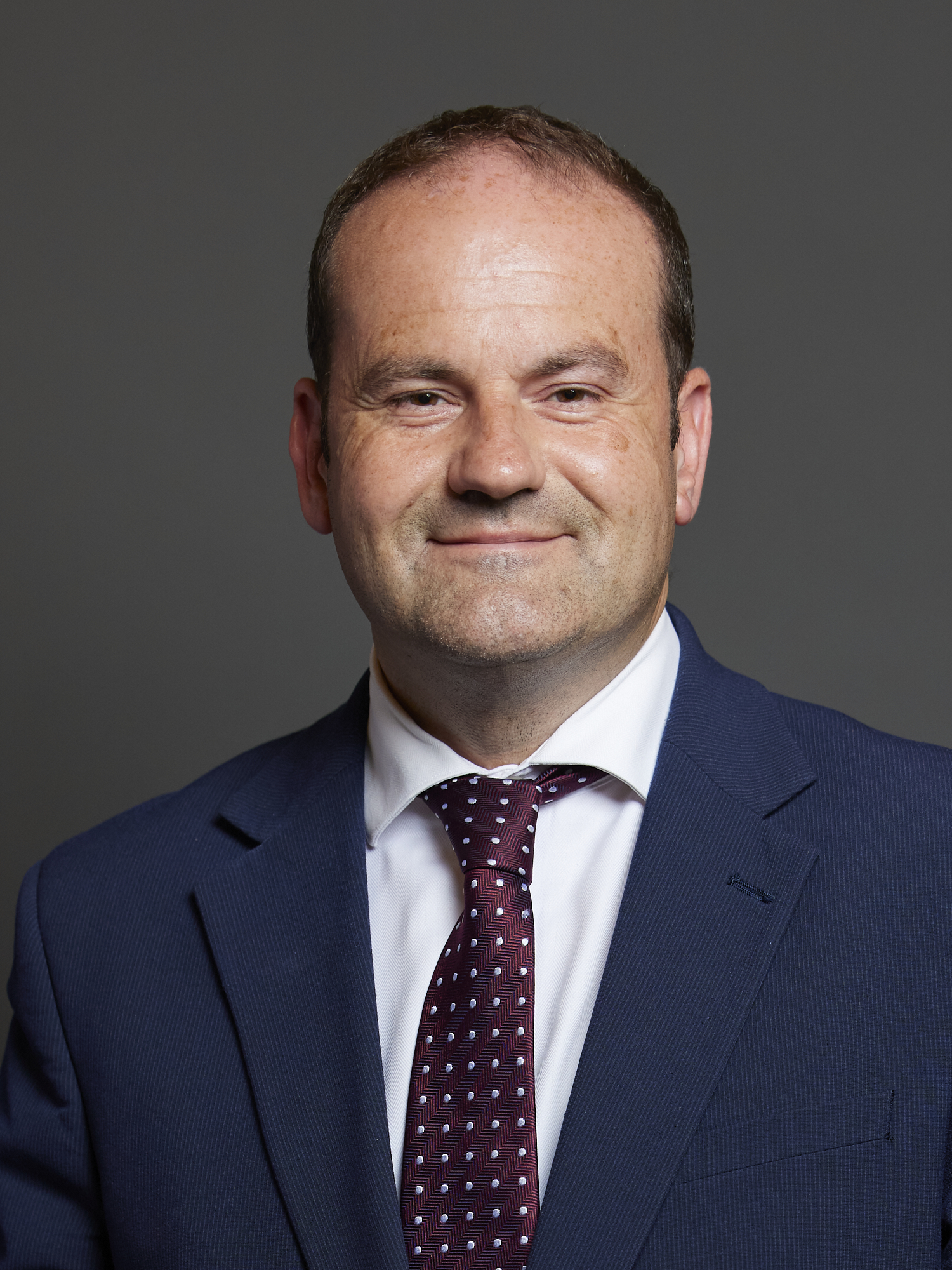
- Official portrait, 2024

Member of Parliament for West Dunbartonshire
- Incumbent
- Assumed office 4 July 2024
- Preceded by: Martin Docherty-Hughes
- Majority: 6,010 (15.2%)

Personal details
- Born: Douglas James McAllister Scotland
- Party: Scottish Labour Party
- Children: 2
- Education: University of Glasgow
- Website: https://members.parliament.uk/member/5057/

Douglas James McAllister (born 1973) is a Scottish Labour Party politician who has served as the Member of Parliament (MP) for West Dunbartonshire since July 2024.

== Education and legal career ==
McAllister grew up in Drumry, Clydebank. He graduated from the University of Glasgow in 1995 with a law degree. He worked as a defence lawyer for 27 years.

== Political career ==
He also served as a Councillor for the Kilpatrick Ward in West Dunbartonshire which he represented for 23 years (previously named Hardgate Ward). He was also the Provost of West Dunbartonshire Council for seven years.

In 2021, McAllister contested Clydebank and Milngavie for the Scottish Parliament elections, coming second behind the SNP candidate Marie McNair.

== Personal life ==
McAllister is married and has two sons. He was diagnosed with chronic myeloid leukaemia in 2008.
