= Marie McNair =

Scottish National Party politician

Marie McNair MSP
- Official portrait, 2026

Member of the Scottish Parliament for Clydebank and Milngavie
- Incumbent
- Assumed office 6 May 2021
- Preceded by: Gil Paterson
- Majority: 4,197 (13.4%)

Personal details
- Party: Scottish National Party (since 2016)
- Other political affiliations: Labour (until 2008); Independent (2008–2016)

Marie McNair (born 1975/76) is a Scottish National Party (SNP) politician who has been the Member of the Scottish Parliament (MSP) for Clydebank and Milngavie since May 2021.

== Early career ==
Before entering politics, McNair spent 14 years working as a nurse at St Margaret of Scotland Hospice in Clydebank.

== Political career ==
Initially a member of the Labour Party, McNair was elected as a councillor for the Clydebank Waterfront ward at the 2003 Scottish local elections. She was re-elected in 2007, but quit the party in November 2008 to stand as an independent. In her resignation letter, she said: "There is a ruling clique that ignores views expressed that they don't agree with and their style of leadership has intimidation at its core. These are all issues that have been raised within the party at all levels to no avail. I feel strongly that I can better express and stand up for the views of my constituents when free from the restraints of the Labour Group's ruling clique."

After being re-elected as an independent candidate in 2012 and voting Yes in the 2014 Scottish independence referendum, McNair defected to the SNP in January 2016 and was elected in Clydebank Waterfront for a fifth time in 2017.

In October 2020, she was part of an all-woman shortlist to replace the retiring Gil Paterson as MSP for Clydebank and Milngavie, and was chosen as the candidate the following month. At the election, she was elected with a slightly reduced majority.

Marie has re-elected as MSP on 8 May 2026.

Scottish Parliament
Preceded by Gil Paterson	MSP for Clydebank and Milngavie; 2021 – present	Incumbent
