= West Dunbartonshire =

Council area of Scotland

West Dunbartonshire: Siorrachd Dhùn Breatann an Iar (Scottish Gaelic); Wast Dunbairtonshire (Scots)
- Council area
- Coat of arms

- West Dunbartonshire shown within Scotland
- Coordinates: 55°59′24″N 4°30′54″W
- Sovereign state: United Kingdom
- Country: Scotland
- Lieutenancy area: Dunbartonshire
- Unitary authority: 1 April 1996
- Administrative HQ: Dumbarton Burgh Hall

Government
  - Type: Council
  - Body: West Dunbartonshire Council
  - Control: Labour
  - MPs: Douglas McAllister (L)
  - MSPs: 2 MSPs: Jackie Baillie (L); Marie McNair (SNP)

Area
  - Total: 61 sq mi (159 km^{2})
  - Rank: 31st

Population (2025)
  - Total: 88,340
  - Rank: 26th
  - Density: 1,440/sq mi (556/km^{2})
- Time zone: UTC+0 (GMT)
  - Summer (DST): UTC+1 (BST)
- ISO 3166 code: GB-WDU
- GSS code: S12000039
- Website: west-dunbarton.gov.uk

West Dunbartonshire (Scots: Wast Dunbairtonshire; Scottish Gaelic: Siorrachd Dhùn Breatann an Iar, pronounced [ˈʃirˠəxk ɣum ˈpɾʲɛht̪ən̪ˠ əɲ ˈiəɾ]) is one of the 32 local government council areas of Scotland. The area lies to the north-west of the Glasgow City council area and contains many of Glasgow's commuter towns and villages. West Dunbartonshire also borders Argyll and Bute, East Dunbartonshire, Renfrewshire and Stirling.

The council area was formed in 1996 from the former Clydebank district and the eastern part of Dumbarton district, which had both been part of Strathclyde Region. The districts covered the historic County of Dumbarton, which was abolished in 1975.

West Dunbartonshire has three main urban areas: Clydebank, Dumbarton and the Vale of Leven. The area also includes the intervening rural areas, including the Kilpatrick Hills and the south-eastern bank of Loch Lomond. The council is based at 16 Church Street in Dumbarton, although Clydebank is the largest town.

== History ==
West Dunbartonshire was created in 1996 under the Local Government etc. (Scotland) Act 1994, which abolished the regions and districts which had been created in 1975, replacing them with unitary council areas. West Dunbartonshire covered the area of the abolished Clydebank district and the eastern part of Dumbarton district. In a referendum in 1994 the largely rural western part of the old Dumbarton district, including the town of Helensburgh, had voted to join Argyll and Bute rather than stay with Dumbarton.

The 1994 act originally named the new district "Dumbarton and Clydebank", but the shadow authority elected in 1995 requested a change of name to "West Dunbartonshire", which was agreed by the government before the new council area came into force.

== Demography ==
=== Languages ===
The 2022 Scottish Census reported that out of 86,078 residents aged three and over, 28,045 (32.6%) considered themselves able to speak or read the Scots language.

The 2022 Scottish Census reported that out of 86,068 residents aged three and over, 835 (1%) considered themselves able to speak or read Gaelic.

== Governance ==
The council is based in Dumbarton at the former Burgh Hall. The council has been under no overall control since 2024.

== Wider politics ==
=== Constituencies ===
West Dunbartonshire is represented by two constituency members of the Scottish Parliament (MSPs) elected in the Dunbarton constituency and in the Clydebank and Milngavie constituency along with one member of the United Kingdom parliament (MP) elected in the West Dunbartonshire constituency area.

=== Independence referendum ===
On 18 September 2014, West Dunbartonshire was one of the four council areas which had a majority "Yes" vote in the Scottish Independence Referendum at 54.0% with an 87.9% turnout rate.. The other council areas voting "Yes" were Dundee (57.3%), Glasgow (53.5%) and North Lanarkshire (51.1%).

== Communities ==
The area is divided into 17 community council areas, 10 of which have community councils as at 2023 (being those with asterisks in the list below):

- Alexandria*
- Balloch and Haldane
- Bonhill and Dalmonach*
- Bowling and Milton*
- Clydebank East*
- Dalmuir and Mountblow
- Dumbarton East and Central*
- Dumbarton North
- Dumbarton West
- Duntocher and Hardgate
- Faifley*
- Kilmaronock*
- Linnvale and Drumry
- Old Kilpatrick*
- Parkhall, North Kilbowie and Central*
- Renton
- Silverton and Overtoun*

== Settlements ==
The largest settlements in West Dunbartonshire.

Largest settlements by population:

Settlement	Population (2020)
Clydebank	25,620
Dumbarton	20,480
Bonhill	9,060
Alexandria	6,710
Duntocher	6,680
Balloch	6,010
Faifley	4,740
Old Kilpatrick	4,470
Renton	2,350
Bowling	560

== Main sights ==
- Erskine Bridge
- Dumbarton Castle
- Inchmurrin, the largest freshwater island in the British Isles
- Kilpatrick Hills
- Loch Lomond
- Loch Lomond and the Trossachs National Park
- Overtoun Bridge
- River Leven

== See also ==
- Dumbarton
- Clydebank
- Vale of Leven
- Dumbarton Burgh Hall
- Municipal Buildings, Dumbarton
- Clydebank Town Hall
- County Buildings, Dumbarton
- East Dunbartonshire
- Clydebank (district)
- Dumbarton (district)
- Strathclyde
- County of Dumbarton
- The Lennox
- List of places in West Dunbartonshire
- List of castles in West Dunbartonshire
- West Dunbartonshire Council elections
- Dumbarton (Scottish Parliament constituency)
- Clydebank and Milngavie (Scottish Parliament constituency)
- West Dunbartonshire (constituency)
- Subdivisions of Scotland
