= List of state schools in Scotland (council areas excluding cities, S–W) =

The following is a partial list of currently operating state schools in the unitary council areas of Scottish Borders, Shetland Islands, South Ayrshire, South Lanarkshire, Stirling, West Dunbartonshire, West Lothian and Western Isles in Scotland, United Kingdom. You may also find Category:Schools in Scotland of use to find a particular school. See also the List of the oldest schools in the United Kingdom.

By unitary council area.

Note that the allocations to address and council area may not be accurate in every case and you can help if you have access to local directories.

== Scottish Borders ==
=== Primary schools ===
- Ancrum Primary School, Ancrum
- Ayton Primary School, Ayton
- Balmoral Primary School, Galashiels
- Broomlands Primary School, Kelso
- Broughton Primary School, Broughton
- Burgh Primary School, Galashiels
- Burnfoot Community School, Hawick
- Channelkirk Primary School, Oxton
- Chirnside Primary School, Chirnside
- Clovenfords Primary School, Clovenfords
- Cockburnspath Primary School, Cockburnspath
- Coldingham Primary School, Coldingham
- Coldstream Primary School, Coldstream
- Denholm Primary School, Denholm
- Drumlanrig St Cuthbert's Primary School, Hawick
- Duns Primary School, Duns
- Earlston Primary School, Earlston
- Edenside Primary School, Kelso
- Ednam Primary School, Ednam
- Eyemouth Primary School, Eyemouth
- Fountainhall Primary School, Fountainhall
- Glendinning Terrace Primary School, Galashiels
- Gordon Primary School, Gordon
- Greenlaw Primary School, Greenlaw
- Halyrude Primary School, Peebles
- Heriot Primary School, Heriot
- Jedburgh Grammar Campus, Jedburgh (ages 2–18)
- Kingsland Primary School, Peebles
- Kirkhope Primary School, Ettrickbridge
- Knowepark Primary School, Selkirk
- Langlee Primary School, Galashiels
- Lauder Primary School, Lauder
- Lilliesleaf Primary School, Lilliesleaf
- Melrose Primary School, Melrose
- Morebattle Primary School, Morebattle
- Newcastleton Primary School, Newcastleton
- Newlands Primary School, West Linton
- Newtown Primary School, Newtown St Boswells
- Philiphaugh Community School, Selkirk
- Priorsford Primary School, Peebles
- Reston Primary School, Reston
- Sprouston Primary School, Sprouston
- St. Boswells Primary School, St Boswells
- St. Joseph's R.C. Primary School, Selkirk
- St. Margaret's R.C. Primary School, Galashiels
- St. Peter's Primary School, Galashiels
- St. Ronan's Primary School, Innerleithen
- Stirches Primary School, Hawick
- Stow Primary School, Stow
- Swinton Primary School, Swinton
- Trinity Primary School, Hawick
- Tweedbank Primary School, Tweedbank
- Walkerburn Primary School, Walkerburn
- West Linton Primary School, West Linton
- Westruther Primary School, Westruther
- Wilton Primary School, Hawick
- Yarrow Primary School, Yarrow
- Yetholm Primary School, Town Yetholm

=== Secondary schools ===
- Berwickshire High School, Duns
- Earlston High School, Earlston
- Eyemouth High School, Eyemouth
- Galashiels Academy, Galashiels
- Hawick High School, Hawick
- Jedburgh Grammar Campus, Jedburgh (ages 2–18)
- Kelso High School, Kelso
- Peebles High School, Peebles
- Selkirk High School, Selkirk

=== Special schools ===
- Wilton Centre, Hawick

== Shetland Islands ==
=== Primary schools ===
- Aith Junior High School, Bixter (ages 3–16)
- Baltasound Junior High School, Baltasound, Unst (ages 3–16)
- Bell's Brae Primary School, Lerwick
- Brae High School, Brae (ages 2–18)
- Burravoe Primary School, Burravoe, Yell
- Cullivoe Primary School, Cullivoe, Yell
- Cunningsburgh Primary School, Cunningsburgh
- Dunrossness Primary School, Dunrossness
- Fair Isle Primary School, Fair Isle
- Foula Primary School, Foula
- Hamnavoe Primary School, Burra
- Happyhansel Primary School, Walls
- Lunnasting Primary School, Vidlin
- Mid Yell Junior High School, Mid Yell (ages 2–16)
- Mossbank Primary School, Mossbank
- Nesting Primary School, Skellister
- North Roe Primary School, North Roe
- Ollaberry Primary School, Ollaberry
- Sandness Primary School, Sandness
- Sandwick Junior High School, Sandwick (ages 3–16)
- Scalloway Primary School, Scalloway
- Skeld Primary School, Skeld
- Sound Primary School, Lerwick
- Tingwall Primary School, Tingwall
- Urafirth Primary School, Hillswick
- Whalsay School, Symbister (ages 3–16)
- Whiteness Primary School, Whiteness

=== Secondary schools ===
- Aith Junior High School, Bixter (ages 3–16)
- Anderson High School, Lerwick
- Baltasound Junior High School, Baltasound, Unst (ages 3–16)
- Brae High School, Brae (ages 3–18)
- Mid Yell Junior High School, Mid Yell (ages 3–16)
- Sandwick Junior High School, Sandwick (ages 3–16)
- Whalsay School, Symbister (ages 3–16)

== South Ayrshire ==
=== Nursery schools ===
- Cherry Tree Early Years Centre, Ayr
- Girvan Early Years Centre, Girvan
- Prestwick North Early Years Centre, Prestwick
- Space Place Early Years Centre, Prestwick
- Wallacetown Early Years Centre, Ayr

=== Primary schools ===
- Alloway Primary School, Alloway
- Annbank Primary School, Mossblown
- Ballantrae Primary School, Ballantrae
- Barassie Primary School, Barassie
- Barr Primary School, Barr
- Barrhill Primary School, Barrhill
- Braehead Primary School, Ayr
- Colmonell Primary School, Colmonell
- Coylton Primary School, Coylton
- Crosshill Primary School, Crosshill
- Culzean Primary School, Maybole
- Dailly Primary School, Dailly
- Dalmilling Primary School, Ayr
- Doonfoot Primary School, Ayr
- Dundonald Primary School, Dundonald
- Fisherton Primary School, Dunure
- Forehill Primary School, Ayr
- Girvan Primary School, Girvan
- Glenburn Primary School, Prestwick
- Grammar Primary School, Ayr
- Heathfield Primary School, Ayr
- Holmston Primary School, Ayr
- Kincaidston Primary School, Ayr
- Kingcase Primary School, Prestwick
- Kirkmichael Primary School, Maybole
- Maidens Primary School, Girvan
- Minishant Primary School, Minishant
- Monkton Primary School, Prestwick
- Muirhead Primary School, Troon
- Newton Primary School, Ayr
- Sacred Heart Primary School, Girvan
- Straiton Primary School, Maybole
- Struthers Primary School, Troon
- Symington Primary School, Symington
- St. Cuthbert's Primary School, Maybole
- St. John's Primary School, Ayr
- St. Ninian's Primary School, Prestwick
- St. Patrick's Primary School, Troon
- Tarbolton Primary School, Tarbolton
- Troon Primary School, Troon

=== Secondary schools ===
- Ayr Academy, Ayr
- Belmont Academy, Ayr
- Carrick Academy, Maybole
- Girvan Academy, Girvan
- Kyle Academy, Ayr
- Marr College, Troon
- Queen Margaret Academy, Ayr
- Prestwick Academy, Prestwick

=== Special schools ===
- Invergarven School, Girvan
- Southcraig School, Ayr

== South Lanarkshire ==
=== Nursery schools ===
- Avondale ELC, Strathaven
- Ballerup Nursery Centre, East Kilbride
- Calderside Nursery, Blantyre
- Cathkin Community Nursery, Whitlawburn
- Early Learning Unit, Hamilton
- First Step Community Nursery, Hamilton
- Glenburgh Nursery, Rutherglen
- Halfmerke Community Nursery, East Kilbride
- Hollandbush Nursery, Hamilton
- Kilbryde ELC, East Kilbride
- Kirkstyle ELC, Carluke
- Larkhall Children's Centre, Larkhall
- Lightburn ELC, Halfway
- Millburn ELC, Newton
- Rigside and Rural Communities Nursery, Lanark
- Rooftop Nursery, East Kilbride
- Springlaw ELC, Springhall
- Westburn Nursery, Cambuslang
- Woodhill ELC, Kirkmuirhill
- Woodlands Nursery Centre, Hamilton

=== Primary schools ===
- Abington Primary School, Abington
- Auchengray Primary School, Carnwath
- Auchinraith Primary School, Blantyre
- Auldhouse Primary School, Auldhouse
- Bankhead Primary School, Rutherglen
- Beckford Primary School, Hamilton
- Bent Primary School, Lesmahagow
- Biggar Primary School, Biggar
- Black Mount Primary School, Biggar
- Blacklaw Primary School, St Leonards
- Blackwood Primary School, Kirkmuirhill
- Bothwell Primary School, Bothwell
- Braehead Primary School, Lanark
- Braidwood Primary School, Braidwood
- Burgh Primary School, Rutherglen
- Burnside Primary School, Burnside
- Cairns Primary School, Halfway
- Calderwood Primary School, Rutherglen
- Canberra Primary School, Westwood
- Carluke Primary School, Carluke
- Carmichael Primary School, Thankerton
- Carnwath Primary School, Carnwath
- Carstairs Junction Primary School, Carstairs Junction
- Carstairs Primary School, Carstairs
- Castlefield Primary School, Greenhills
- Cathkin Primary School, Cathkin
- Chapelton Primary School, Chapelton
- Chatelherault Primary School, Hamilton
- Coalburn Primary School, Coalburn
- Coulter Primary School, Biggar
- Craigbank Primary School, Larkhall
- Crawford Primary School, Crawford
- Crawforddyke Primary School, Carluke
- Crosshouse Primary School, Greenhills
- Dalserf Primary School, Ashgill
- David Livingstone Memorial Primary School, Blantyre
- Douglas Primary School, Douglas
- East Milton Primary School, Westwood
- Forth Primary School, Forth
- Gilmourton Primary School, Strathaven
- Glassford Primary School, Glassford
- Glengowan Primary School, Larkhall
- Glenlee Primary School, Burnbank
- Greenhills Primary School, Greenhills
- Halfmerke Primary School, East Mains
- Hallside Primary School, Drumsagard
- Hareleeshill Primary School, Larkhall
- Heathery Knowe Primary School, The Murray
- High Blantyre Primary School, Blantyre
- High Mill Primary School, Carluke
- Hunter Primary School, Calderwood
- Jackton Primary School, East Kilbride
- James Aiton Primary School, Cambuslang
- Kirkfieldbank Primary School, Kirkfieldbank
- Kirklandpark Primary School, Strathaven
- Kirkton Primary School, Carluke
- Kirktonholme Primary School, West Mains
- Lamington Primary School, Lamington
- Lanark Primary School, Lanark
- Law Primary School, Law
- Leadhills Primary School, Leadhills
- Libberton Primary School, Carnwath
- Loch Primary School, Springhall
- Long Calderwood Primary School, Calderwood
- Machanhill Primary School, Larkhall
- Maxwellton Primary School, Calderwood
- Milton Primary School, Lesmahagow
- Mossneuk Primary School, Mossneuk
- Mount Cameron Primary School, St Leonards
- Mount Cameron Primary School Gaelic Unit, St Leonards
- Muiredge Primary School, Uddingston
- Murray Primary School, The Murray
- Neilsland Primary School, Hamilton
- Netherburn Primary School, Netherburn
- New Lanark Primary School, Lanark
- Newfield Primary School, Stonehouse
- Newton Farm Primary School, Newton
- Our Lady and St. Anne's Primary School, Hamilton
- Our Lady of Lourdes Primary School, The Murray
- Park View Primary School, Halfway
- Quarter Primary School, Quarter
- Rigside Primary School, Rigside
- Robert Owen Memorial Primary School, Lanark
- Robert Smillie Memorial Primary School, Larkhall
- Sandford Primary School, Strathaven
- South Park Primary School, The Murray
- Spittal Primary School, Spittal
- St. Anthony's Primary School, Springhall
- St. Athanasius' Primary School, Carluke
- St. Blane's Primary School, Blantyre
- St. Bride's Primary School, Bothwell
- St. Bride's Primary School, Cambuslang
- St. Cadoc's Primary School, Halfway
- St. Charles' Primary School, Newton
- St. Columbkille's Primary School, Rutherglen
- St. Cuthbert's Primary School, Burnbank
- St. Elizabeth's Primary School, Hamilton
- St. Hilary's Primary School, St Leonards
- St. John the Baptist Primary School, Uddingston
- St. John's Primary School, Blackwood
- St. John's Primary School, Hamilton
- St. Joseph's Primary School, Blantyre
- St. Kenneth's Primary School, West Mains
- St. Leonard's Primary School, Calderwood
- St. Louise Primary School, The Murray
- St. Mark's Primary School, Hamilton
- St. Mark's Primary School, Blairbeth
- St. Mary's Primary School, Hamilton
- St. Mary's Primary School, Lanark
- St. Mary's Primary School, Larkhall
- St. Ninian's Primary School, Hamilton
- St. Patrick's Primary School, Strathaven
- St. Paul's Primary School, Hamilton
- St. Peter's Primary School, Hamilton
- St. Vincent's Primary School, Greenhills
- Stonehouse Primary School, Stonehouse
- Tinto Primary School, Symington
- Townhill Primary School, Hillhouse
- Udston Primary School, Hamilton
- Underbank Primary School, Crossford
- West Coats Primary School, Cambuslang
- Wester Overton Primary School, Strathaven
- Wiston Primary School, Biggar
- Woodhead Primary School, Woodhead
- Woodpark Primary School, Lesmahagow
- Woodside Primary School, Silvertonhill

=== Secondary schools ===
- Biggar High School, Biggar
- Calderglen High School, East Kilbride
- Calderside Academy, Blantyre
- Carluke High School, Carluke
- Cathkin High School, Cambuslang
- Duncanrig Secondary School, East Kilbride
- Hamilton Grammar School, Hamilton
- Holy Cross High School, Hamilton
- John Ogilvie High School, Hamilton
- Lanark Grammar School, Lanark
- Larkhall Academy, Larkhall
- Lesmahagow High School, Lesmahagow
- St Andrew's and St Bride's High School, East Kilbride
- Stonelaw High School, Rutherglen
- Strathaven Academy, Strathaven
- Trinity High School, Eastfield
- Uddingston Grammar School, Uddingston

=== Special schools ===
- Greenburn School, East Kilbride
- Hamilton School for the Deaf, Hamilton
- Rutherglen High School, Cambuslang
- Sanderson High School, East Kilbride
- Stanmore House School, Lanark
- Victoria Park School, Carluke
- West Mains School, East Kilbride

== Stirling ==
=== Nursery schools ===
- Arnprior Nursery, Arnprior
- Cornton Nursery, Cornton
- Cowie Nursery, Cowie
- Crianlarich Nursery, Crianlarich
- Fallin Nursery and Out of School Care, Fallin
- Hillview Children and Family Centre, Stirling
- Killin Nursery, Killin
- Park Drive Nursery, Bannockburn
- Raploch Nursery, Raploch
- Wellgreen Nursery, Stirling

=== Primary schools ===
- Aberfoyle Primary School, Aberfoyle
- Allan's Primary School, Stirling
- Balfron Primary School, Balfron
- Bannockburn Primary School, Bannockburn
- Borestone Primary School, St. Ninians
- Braehead Primary School, Stirling
- Bridge of Allan Primary School, Bridge of Allan
- Buchlyvie Primary School, Buchlyvie
- Callander Primary School, Callander
- Cambusbarron Primary School, Cambusbarron
- Cornton Primary School, Cornton
- Cowie Primary School, Cowie
- Crianlarich Primary School, Crianlarich
- Deanston Primary School, Deanston
- Doune Primary School, Doune
- Drymen Primary School, Drymen
- Dunblane Primary School, Dunblane
- East Plean Primary School, Plean
- Fallin Primary School, Fallin
- Fintry Primary School, Fintry
- Gargunnock Primary School, Gargunnock
- Gartmore Primary School, Gartmore
- Killearn Primary School, Killearn
- Killin Primary School, Killin
- Kincardine-In-Menteith Primary School, Stirling
- Kippen Primary School, Kippen
- Newton Primary School, Dunblane
- Our Lady's Primary School, Stirling
- Port of Menteith Primary School, Port of Menteith
- Raploch Primary School, Raploch
- Riverside Primary School, Stirling
- St. Margaret's R.C. Primary School, Cowie
- St. Mary's Episcopal Primary School, Dunblane
- St. Mary's R.C. Primary School, Bannockburn
- St. Ninian's Primary School, Stirling
- Strathblane Primary School, Blanefield
- Strathyre Primary School, Strathyre
- Thornhill Primary School, Thornhill

=== Secondary schools ===
- Balfron High School, Balfron
- Bannockburn High School, Bannockburn
- Dunblane High School, Dunblane
- McLaren High School, Callander
- St Modan's High School, Stirling
- Stirling High School, Stirling
- Wallace High School, Stirling

=== Special schools ===
- Ballikinrain Residential School, Balfron
- Camphill School
- Castleview School,
- Kildean Pre-School
- Kildean School
- Riverside School
- Snowdon School
- Whins of Milton School

== West Dunbartonshire ==
=== Primary schools ===
- Aitkenbar Primary School, Bellsmyre
- Balloch Primary School, Balloch
- Bonhill Primary School, Bonhill
- Braehead Primary School, Dumbarton
- Carleith Primary School, Duntocher
- Christie Park Primary School, Alexandria
- Clydemuir Primary School, Dalmuir
- Dalreoch Primary School, Castlehill
- Edinbarnet Primary School, Faifley
- Gartocharn Primary School, Gartocharn
- Gavinburn Primary School, Old Kilpatrick
- Goldenhill Primary School, Hardgate
- Kilbowie Primary School, Clydebank
- Knoxland Primary School, Dumbarton
- Lennox Primary School, Bonhill
- Levenvale Primary School, Alexandria
- Linnvale Primary School, Clydebank
- Our Holy Redeemer's Primary School, Clydebank
- Our Lady of Loretto Primary School, Dalmuir
- Renton Primary School, Renton
- St. Eunan's Primary School, Drumry
- St. Joseph's Primary School, Faifley
- St. Kessog's Primary School, Balloch
- St. Martin's Primary School, Renton
- St. Mary's Primary School, Alexandria
- St. Mary's Primary School, Duntocher
- St. Michael's Primary School, Brucehill
- St. Patrick's Primary School, Silverton
- St. Peter's Primary School, Bellsmyre
- St. Ronan's Primary School, Bonhill
- St. Stephen's Primary School, Clydebank
- Whitecrook Primary School, Clydebank

=== Secondary schools ===
- Clydebank High School, Clydebank
- Dumbarton Academy, Dumbarton
- Our Lady and St Patrick's High School, Dumbarton
- St Peter the Apostle High School, Clydebank
- Vale of Leven Academy, Alexandria

=== Special schools ===
- Cunard School, Clydebank
- Kilpatrick School, Dalmuir

== West Lothian ==
=== Primary schools ===
- Addiewell Primary School, Addiewell
- Armadale Primary School, Armdale
- Balbardie Primary School, Bathgate
- Bankton Primary School, Livingston
- Bellsquarry Primary School, Bellsquarry
- Blackburn Primary School, Blackburn
- Blackridge Primary School, Blackridge
- Boghall Primary School, Boghall
- Bridgend Primary School, Bridgend
- Broxburn Primary School, Broxburn
- Calderwood Primary School, East Calder
- Carmondean Primary School, Livingston
- Croftmalloch Primary School, Whitburn
- Deans Primary School, Deans
- Dedridge Primary School, Dedridge
- East Calder Primary School, East Calder
- Eastertoun Primary School, Armadale
- Falla Hill Primary School, Fauldhouse
- Greenrigg Primary School, Greenrigg
- Harrysmuir Primary School, Livingston
- Holy Family R.C. Primary School, Winchburgh
- Howden St Andrew's Primary School, Howden
- Kirkhill Primary School, Broxburn
- Kirknewton Primary School, Kirknewton
- Knightsridge Primary School, Knightsridge
- Letham Primary School, Craigshill
- Linlithgow Bridge Primary School, Linlithgow Bridge
- Linlithgow Primary School, Linlithgow
- Livingston Village Primary School, Livingston Village
- Longridge Primary School, Longridge
- Low Port Primary School, Linlithgow
- Meldrum Primary School, Livingston
- Mid Calder Primary School, Mid Calder
- Murrayfield Primary School, Blackburn
- Our Lady of Lourdes Primary School, Blackburn
- Our Lady's R.C. Primary School, Stoneyburn
- Parkhead Primary School, West Calder
- Peel Primary School, Livingston
- Polkemmet Primary School, Whitburn
- Pumpherston & Uphall Station Community Primary School, Pumpherston
- Riverside Primary School, Craigshill
- Seafield Primary School, Seafield
- Simpson Primary School, Bathgate
- Southdale Primary School, Armadale
- Springfield Primary School, Linlithgow
- St. Anthony's R.C. Primary School, Armadale
- St. Columba's R.C. Primary School, Bathgate
- St. John Ogilvie R.C. Primary School, Deans
- St. John the Baptist R.C. Primary School, Fauldhouse
- St. Joseph's R.C. Primary School, Linlithgow
- St. Joseph's R.C. Primary School, Whitburn
- St. Mary's R.C. Primary School, Bathgate
- St. Mary's R.C. Primary School, Polbeth
- St. Nicholas R.C. Primary School, Broxburn
- St. Ninian's R.C. Primary School, Livingston
- St. Paul's R.C. Primary School, East Calder
- St. Thomas' R.C. Primary School, Addiewell
- Stoneyburn Primary School, Stoneyburn
- Toronto Primary School, Howden
- Torphichen Primary School, Torphichen
- Uphall Primary School, Uphall
- Westfield Primary School, Westfield
- Whitdale Primary School, Whitburn
- Williamston Primary School, Murieston
- Winchburgh Primary School, Winchburgh
- Windyknowe Primary School, Bathgate
- Woodmuir Primary School, Breich

=== Secondary schools ===
- Armadale Academy, Armdale
- Bathgate Academy, Bathgate
- Broxburn Academy, Broxburn
- Deans Community High School, Deans
- Inveralmond Community High School, Livingston
- The James Young High School, Livingston
- Linlithgow Academy, Linlithgow
- Sinclair Academy, Winchburgh
- St Kentigern's Academy, Blackburn
- St Margaret's Academy, Livingston
- West Calder High School, Polbeth
- Whitburn Academy, Whitburn
- Winchburgh Academy, Winchburgh

=== Special schools ===
- Beatlie School, Livingston
- Burnhouse School, Whitburn, Bathgate
- Cedarbank School, Livingston
- Pinewood School, Blackburn, West Lothian
- Donaldson's School, Linlithgow

== Western Isles ==
=== Primary schools ===
- Back School, Isle of Lewis
- Balivanich School, Isle of Benbecula
- Bernera School, Isle of Lewis (mothballed 2021)
- Breasclete School, Isle of Lewis
- Castlebay Community School, Isle of Barra (ages 3–18)
- Eoligarry School, Barra
- Iochdar School, Isle of South Uist
- Laxdale School, Isle of Lewis
- Leverhulme Memorial School, Leverburgh, Isle of Harris
- Lionel School, Isle of Lewis
- Sgoil an Rubha, Point, Isle of Lewis
- Sgoil an Taobh Siar, Isle of Lewis
- Sgoil Dhalabroig, Isle of South Uist
- Sgoil na Pairc, Isle of Lewis
- Sgoil nan Loch, Leurbost, Isle of Lewis
- Sgoil Uibhish a Tuath, Bayhead, Isle of North Uist
- Shawbost School, Isle of Lewis
- Sir E Scott School, Tarbert Isle of Harris (ages 3–18)
- Stornoway Primary School, Stornoway, Isle of Lewis
- Tolsta School, North Tolsta, Isle of Lewis (mothballed 2019)
- Tong School, Isle of Lewis
- Uig School, Timsgarry, Isle of Lewis

=== Secondary schools ===
- Castlebay Community School, Isle of Barra (ages 3–18)
- Nicolson Institute, Stornoway, Isle of Lewis
- Sgoil Lionacleit, Isle of Benbecula
- Sir E Scott School, Tarbert Isle of Harris (ages 3–18)

== Other schools in Scotland ==
- List of independent schools in Scotland
- List of state schools in Scotland (city council areas)
- List of state schools in Scotland (council areas excluding cities, A–D)
- List of state schools in Scotland (council areas excluding cities, E–H)
- List of state schools in Scotland (council areas excluding cities, I–R)

== See also ==
- Education in Scotland
- Education in the United Kingdom
- Education Scotland
