= List of places in West Dunbartonshire =

Map of places in West Dunbartonshire compiled from this list
See the list of places in Scotland for places in other counties.

This List of places in West Dunbartonshire is a list of links for any town, village, hamlet, castle, golf course, historic house, island, lake, nature reserve, reservoir, river, and other place of interest in the West Dunbartonshire council area of Scotland.

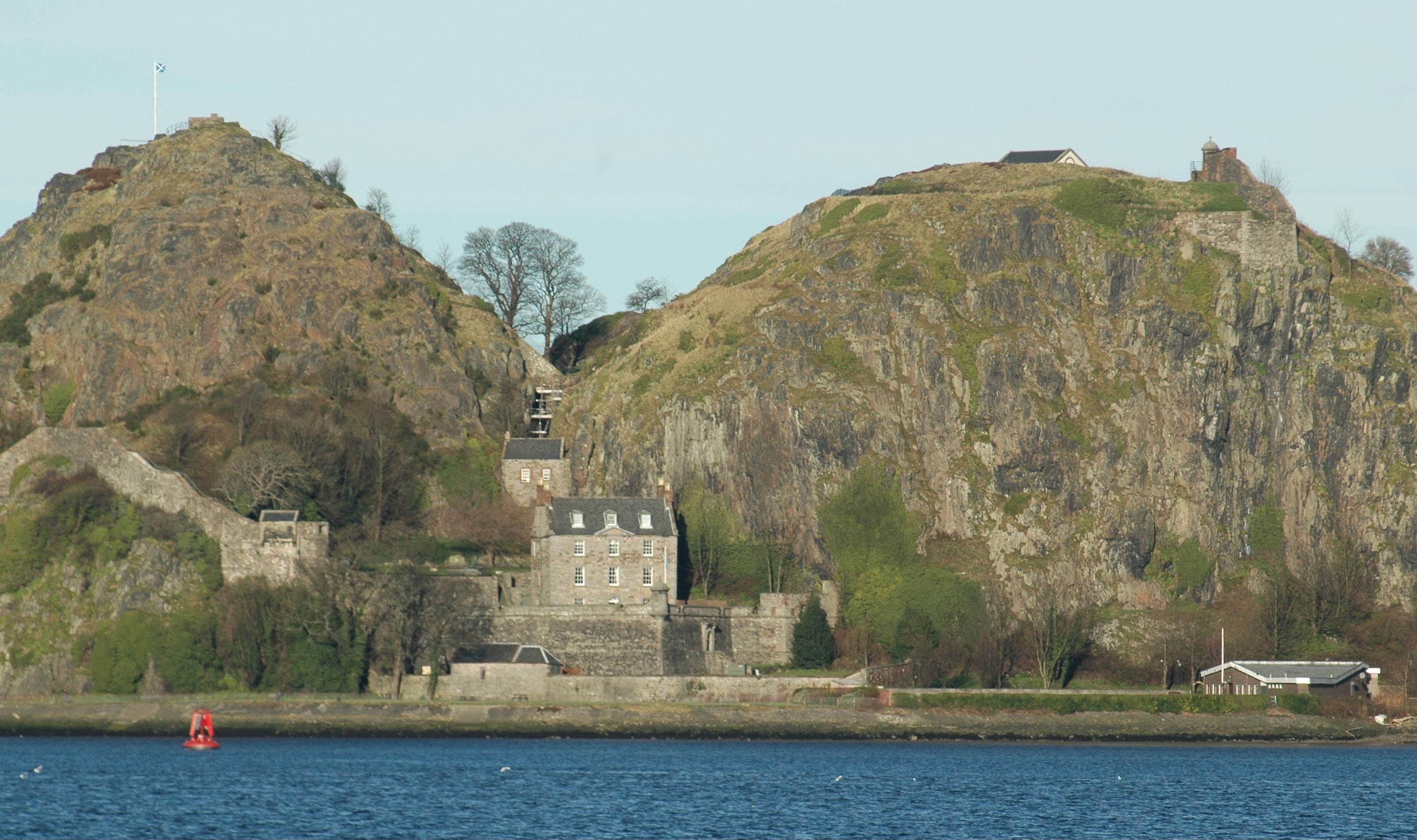
Dumbarton Castle

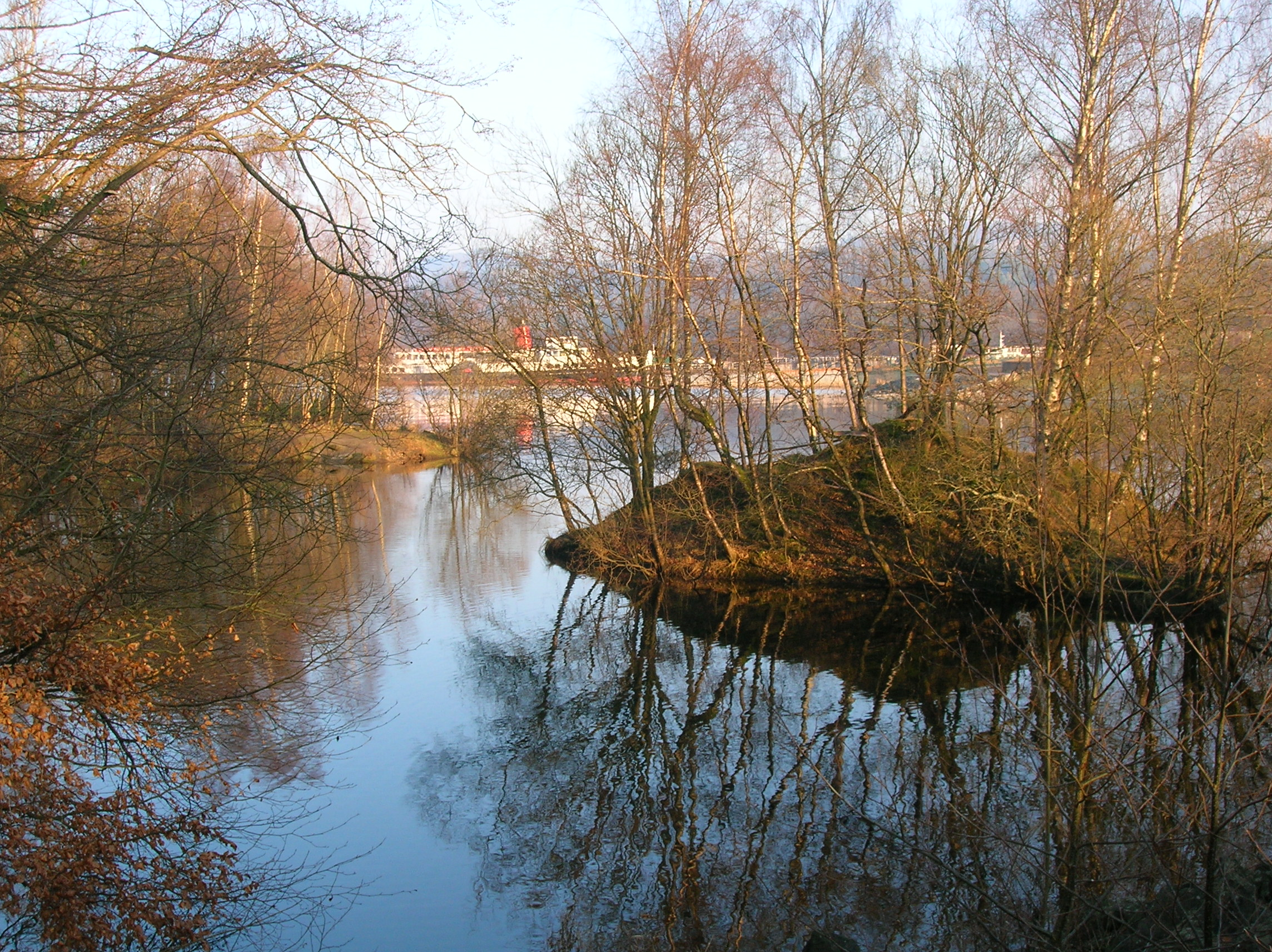
Balloch

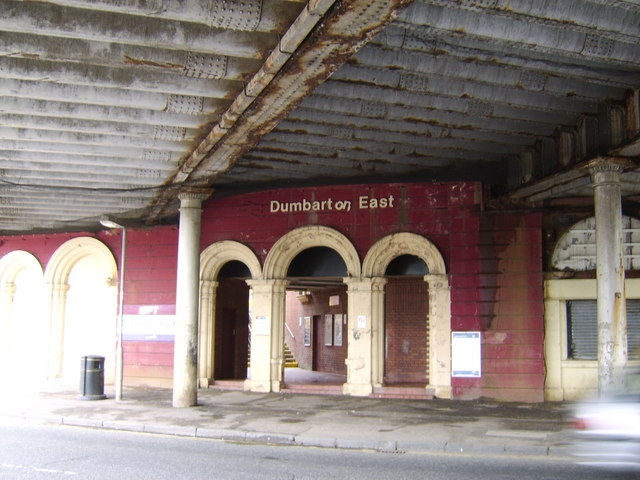
Dumbarton

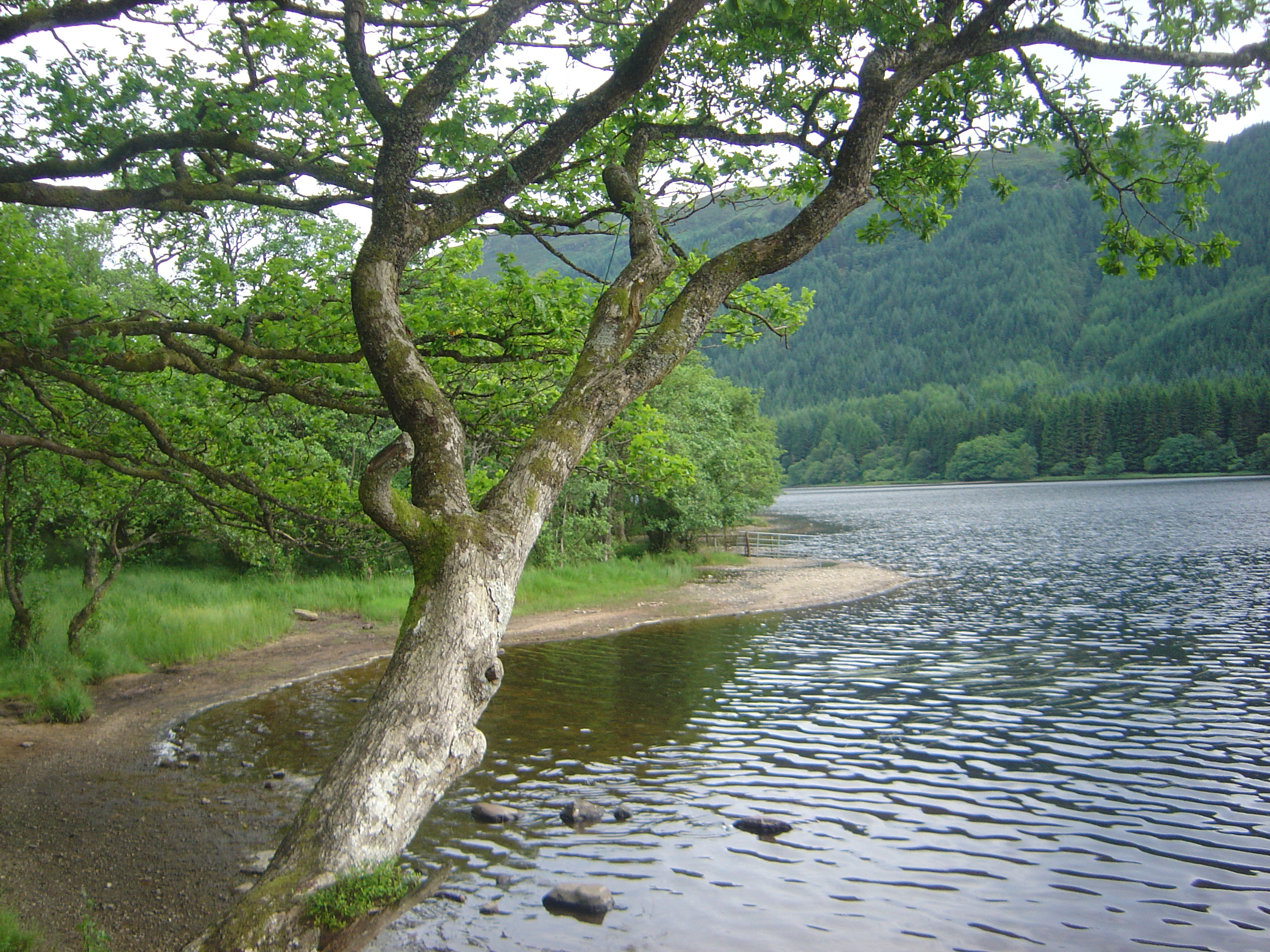
Trossachs

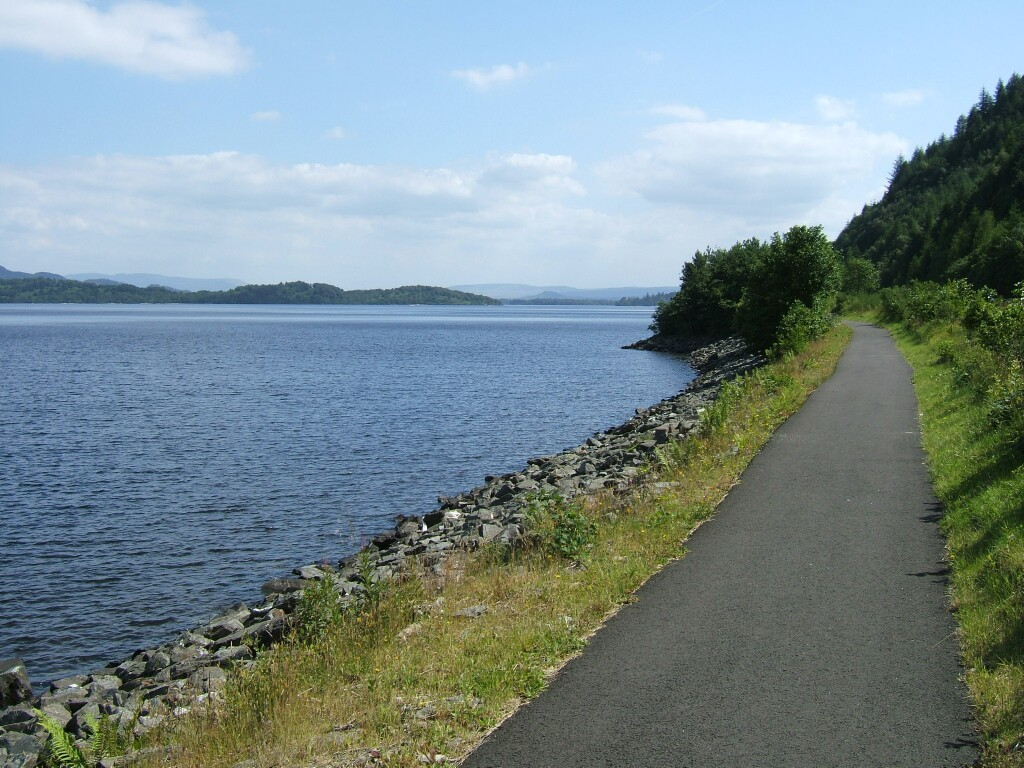
Loch Lomond

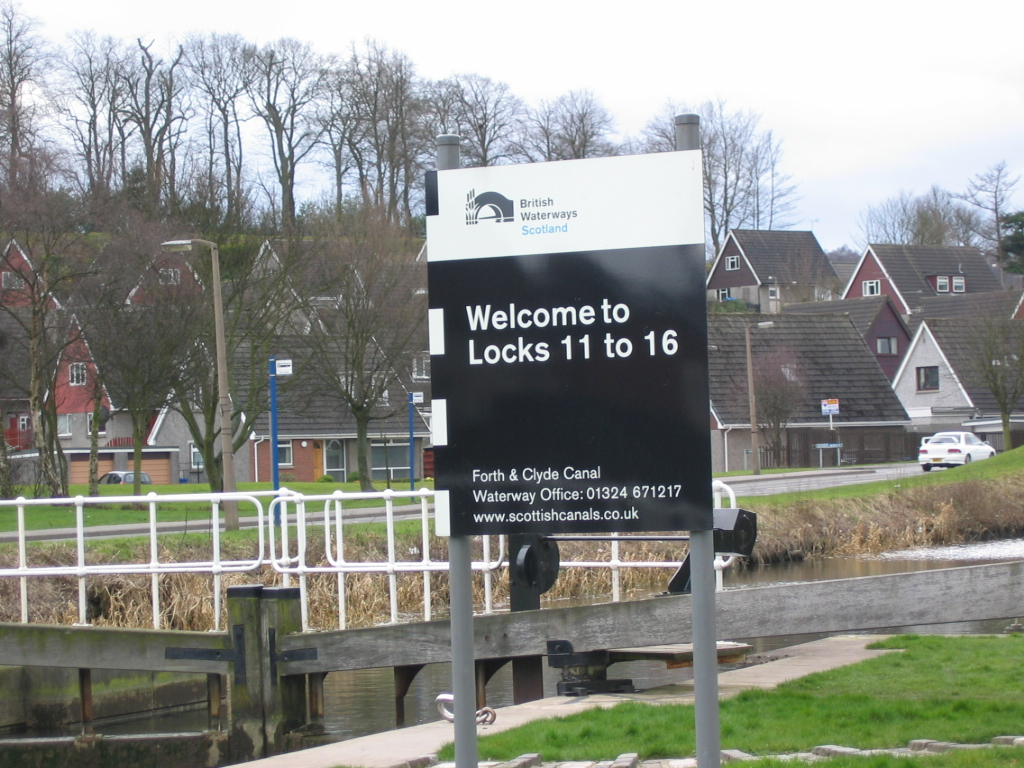
Forth and Clyde Canal

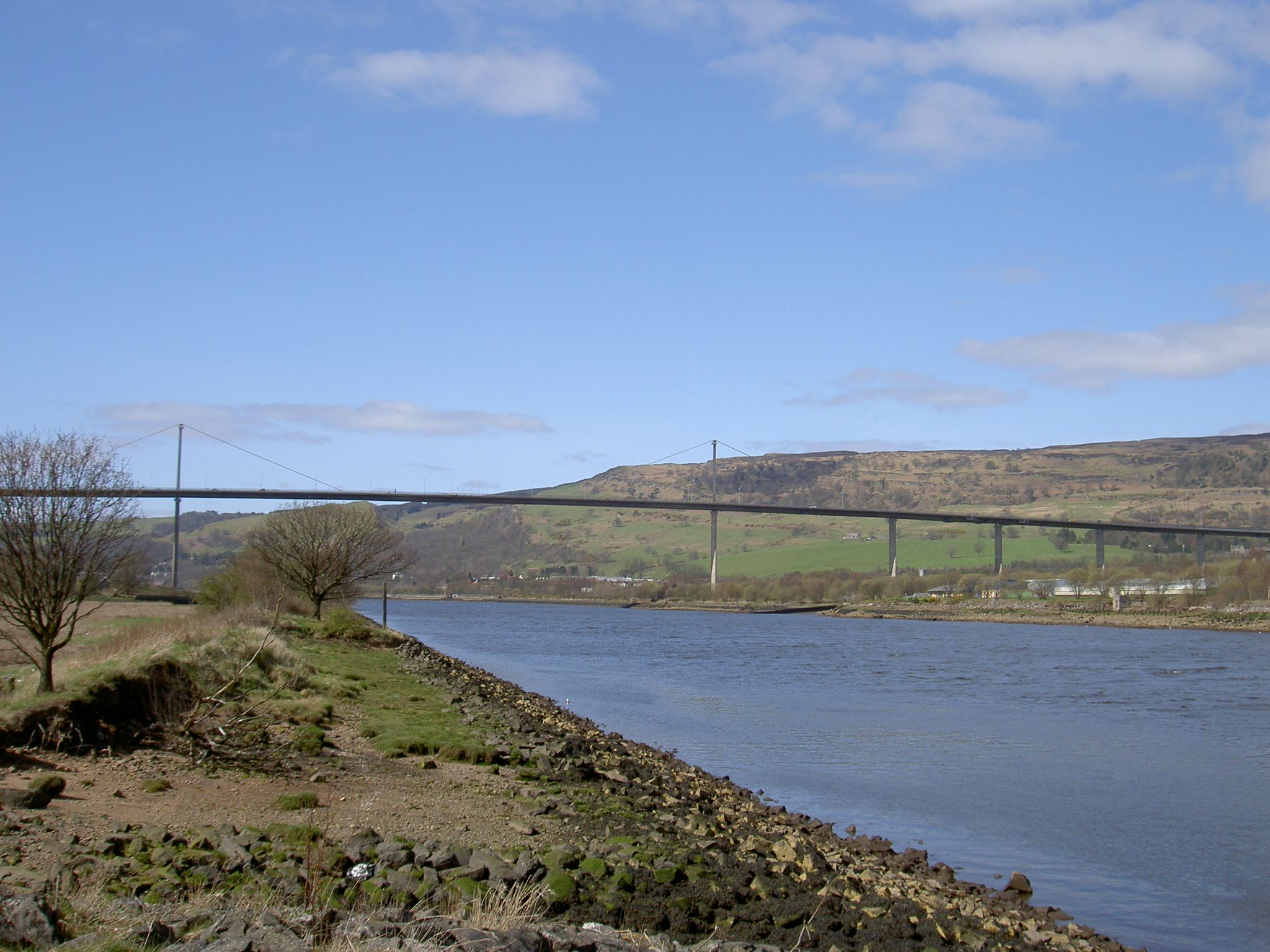
Erskine Bridge

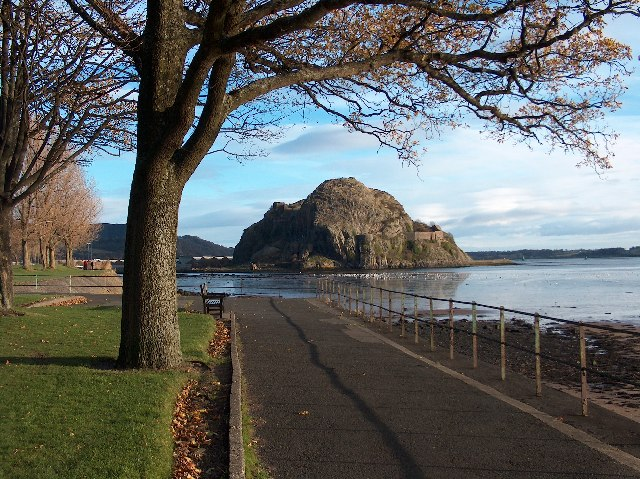
Dumbarton Rock from Levengrove Park

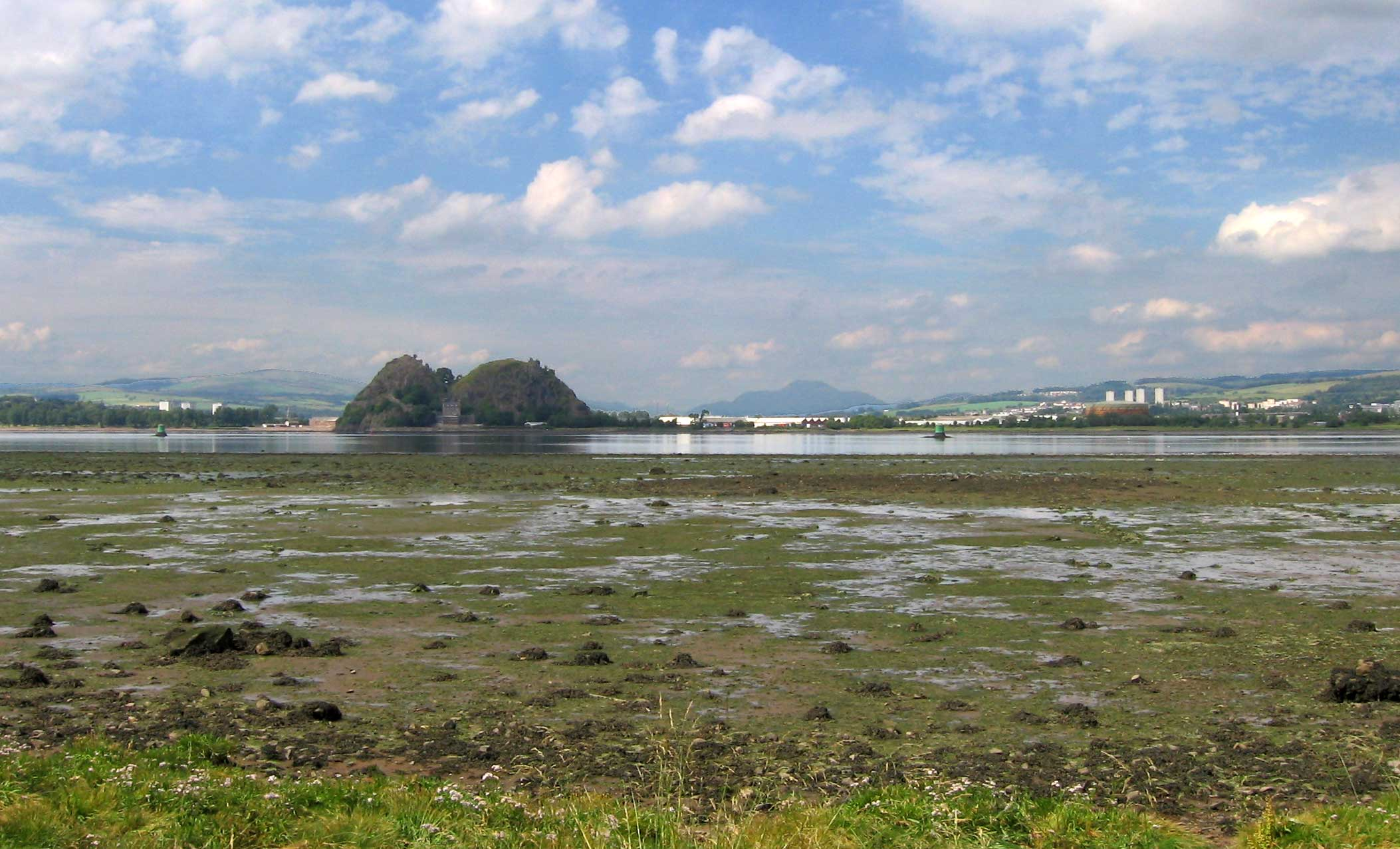
Dumbarton across the Clyde

== A ==
- Alexandria, Alexandria railway station
- Antonine Wall
- Argyll Motor Works

== B ==
- Balloch, Balloch Castle, Balloch Country Park, Balloch railway station
- Bellsmyre
- Bonhill
- Bowling, Bowling railway station
- Brucehill

== C ==
- Castlehill
- Clydebank, Clydebank High School, Clydebank Museum, Clydebank railway station, Clydebank Town Hall
- Crosslet

== D ==
- Dalmonach
- Dalmuir, Dalmuir railway station
- Dalreoch railway station
- Dennystown
- Drumry, Drumry railway station
- Dumbarton, Dumbarton Academy, Dumbarton Castle, Dumbarton Football Stadium, Dumbarton Rock
- Dumbuck Ford
- Duntocher

== E ==
- Erskine Bridge

== F ==
- Faifley
- Forth and Clyde Canal

== G ==
- Glenhead Park
- Golden Jubilee University National Hospital

== H ==
- Hardgate
- Holm Park

== I ==
- Inchmurrin

== J ==
- Jamestown

== K ==
- Kilbowie
- Kilpatrick Hills
- Kilpatrick railway station
- Kirktonhill

== L ==
- Linnvale
- Loch Lomond, Loch Lomond and The Trossachs National Park, Loch Lomond Distillery, Loch Lomond Golf Club

== M ==
- Mill of Haldane
- Milton
- Milton Island
- Millburn Park
- Mountblow

== O ==
- Old Kilpatrick
- Our Lady and St Patrick's High School
- Overtoun, Overtoun House

== P ==
- Parkhall

== R ==
- Radnor Park
- Renton, Renton railway station
- River Clyde
- River Leven
- Rosshead

== S ==
- Silverton
- Singer railway station
- St Peter the Apostle High School

== T ==
- Titan Clydebank

== V ==
- Vale of Leven, Vale of Leven Academy, Vale of Leven Hospital

== W ==
- Westcliff
- West College Scotland
- Whitecrook

== Y ==
- Yoker railway station

== See also ==
- List of listed buildings in West Dunbartonshire
- List of places in Scotland
- Wards of West Dunbartonshire
