= A. Catrina Coleman =

Scottish electrical engineer

A. Catrina Coleman FIEEE FOSA
- Born: 1956 (age 69–70); Glasgow, Scotland
- Education: Notre Dame High School, Dumbarton, Scotland; University of Glasgow
- Known for: semiconductor lasers
- Awards: Engineering Achievement Award, IEEE Photonics Society (2006)
- Scientific career
- Workplaces: University of Glasgow; University of Illinois Urbana-Champaign; University of Texas at Dallas

Ann Catrina Coleman (née Bryce; born 1956) is a Scottish electrical engineer and professor at the University of Texas at Dallas specialising in semiconductor lasers. She is an Associate Vice President (for membership development) of the Photonics Society.

== Early life and education ==
Coleman was born in Glasgow, Scotland, in 1956, the first daughter of Nora (McColl) and Vincent Redvers Hanna. She was educated at St. Stephen's Primary School in Dalmuir and Notre Dame High School in Dumbarton. She then graduated with a BSc degree in physics from the University of Glasgow in 1978, and took teacher training at St. Andrews College of Education in Bearsden. After two years as a high school physics teacher, she returned to the University of Glasgow and was awarded the PhD in physics in 1987.

== Career ==
After graduating, she remained at the University of Glasgow. She joined the Optoelectronics Group of the Department of Electronics and Electrical Engineering at the University of Glasgow as a postdoctoral research assistant and was appointed a research fellow in 1992, becoming a senior research fellow in 1997 and professorial research fellow in 2005. She and the other members of this group are primarily recognised for their pioneering work on fabricating photonic integrated circuits on III-V semiconductor chips based on quantum well intermixing.

In 2012, Coleman joined the Department of Electrical and Computer Engineering at the University of Illinois Urbana-Champaign working in the Micro and Nanotechnology Laboratory. In 2013, she moved to the University of Texas at Dallas as professor of electrical engineering and materials science and engineering.

== Honours and professional activities ==
Coleman was elected a fellow of the Institute of Electrical and Electronics Engineers in 2008 for contributions to compound semiconductor integrated optoelectronic devices, and fellow of the Optical Society of America in 2009. In 2006 she shared (with J.H. Marsh) the IEEE Photonics Society (formerly Lasers and Electro-Optics Society) Engineering Achievement Award for extensive development and commercialization of quantum well intermixing for photonic devices. Coleman has been an elected board member and vice president of the IEEE Photonics Society. She has published more than 100 papers in scholarly journals with more than 40 invited presentations and publications.
