= Robert McCallum =

Robert McCallum may refer to:

- Robert McCallum Jr. (born 1946), American attorney and diplomat
- Robert Hope McCallum (1864–1939), builder, entrepreneur, and social figure in Auckland, New Zealand
- Robert McCallum, pseudonym of Gary Graver (1938–2006), American film director
- Robert McCallum (director), Canadian documentary filmmaker
