= Townend, Dumbarton =

Suburb of Dumbarton, West Dunbartonshire, Scotland, United Kingdom

Coordinates: 55°56′57″N 4°33′37″W

Townend is a moderate to large housing suburb (area) in Dumbarton, Scotland. It stretches from Dumbarton Central Station to Barloan Toll, and to Round Riding Rd to the east.

The area has a mix of residential houses, private and council lets. In the area is the set of River City, a BBC Television soap opera. Dumbarton Common is in Townend, next to the Broadmeadow Industrial Estate and The Meadow Centre, which has the town's swimming bath, sauna, and fitness suite.
