= Scotch Watch =

Scottish guard geese

Scotch Watch was the nickname given to the gaggle of guard geese that patrolled the Ballantine's bonded warehouse in Dumbarton, Scotland from 1959 to 2012. Although eventually augmented by CCTV cameras, the geese were part of the tradition of the facility, and were both a tourist attraction and advertising feature. In 2012, Chivas Brothers, the owner of the warehouse, "retired" the seven geese still guarding the warehouse. They were assimilated into a flock of geese at Glasgow Green.
