= Bellsmyre =

Housing estate in Dumbarton, Scotland

Coordinates: 55°57′30″N 4°32′59″W

Bellsmyre is a large housing estate in the town of Dumbarton in West Dunbartonshire, Scotland. Located on the edge of the Kilpatrick Hills in the northeast of Dumbarton. Bellsmyre is one of five predominantly council housing schemes in Dumbarton, the other four being Westcliff, Silverton, Brucehill and Castlehill.

The estate was originally masterplanned by the architect Ninian Johnston of Boswell, Mitchell & Johnston. The first streets were built in the late 1940s, i.e. Aitkenbar Circle, Bellsmyre Avenue, Carman View and Lomond Drive. The original houses in Bellsmyre are recognisable as they are British Iron and Steel Federation houses The scheme was expanded by the Scottish Special Housing Association (SSHA) in the 1950s as a municipal housing estate, with many residents moving from the city of Glasgow as part of the "overspill" programme of moving people from inner city districts to new towns and other areas outwith the city boundaries. Much of the remaining publicly owned housing under landlord Scottish Homes was transferred to the Bellsmyre Housing Association in 1992.

There are two later built areas adjacent to Bellsmyre; Stoneyflatt and Glenside, of which Stoneyflatt has been almost totally demolished to make way for new mixed tenure housing.

There are also two primary schools in the area, namely Aitkenbar and St Peter's. St Peter's Roman Catholic Church in Bellsmyre was designed by Garner, Preston & Strebel and opened in 1971, winning a RIBA award in 1973. There is also a secondary 'high school' - Our Lady and St. Patrick's, constructed in 2017.

In 2002, Bellsmyre was selected as the pilot area for a Scottish Executive digital inclusion project, which entailed the free provision of home computers with internet access to all households in the area.

On 5 June 2007, an unexploded World War II bomb was found at a housing construction site, and some houses nearby and Aitkenbar Primary School were evacuated. The pupils were relocated to St Peters Primary School for that day.

It was the childhood home of John McFall, a former MP for Dumbarton and the current the Lord Speaker. In a profile of him after his election, The Times noted, "the language which Lord McFall of Alcluith uses to describe the way peers scrutinise and amend bills passed to them from the House of Commons, is pure Bellsmyre."
