= Dumbarton Academy =

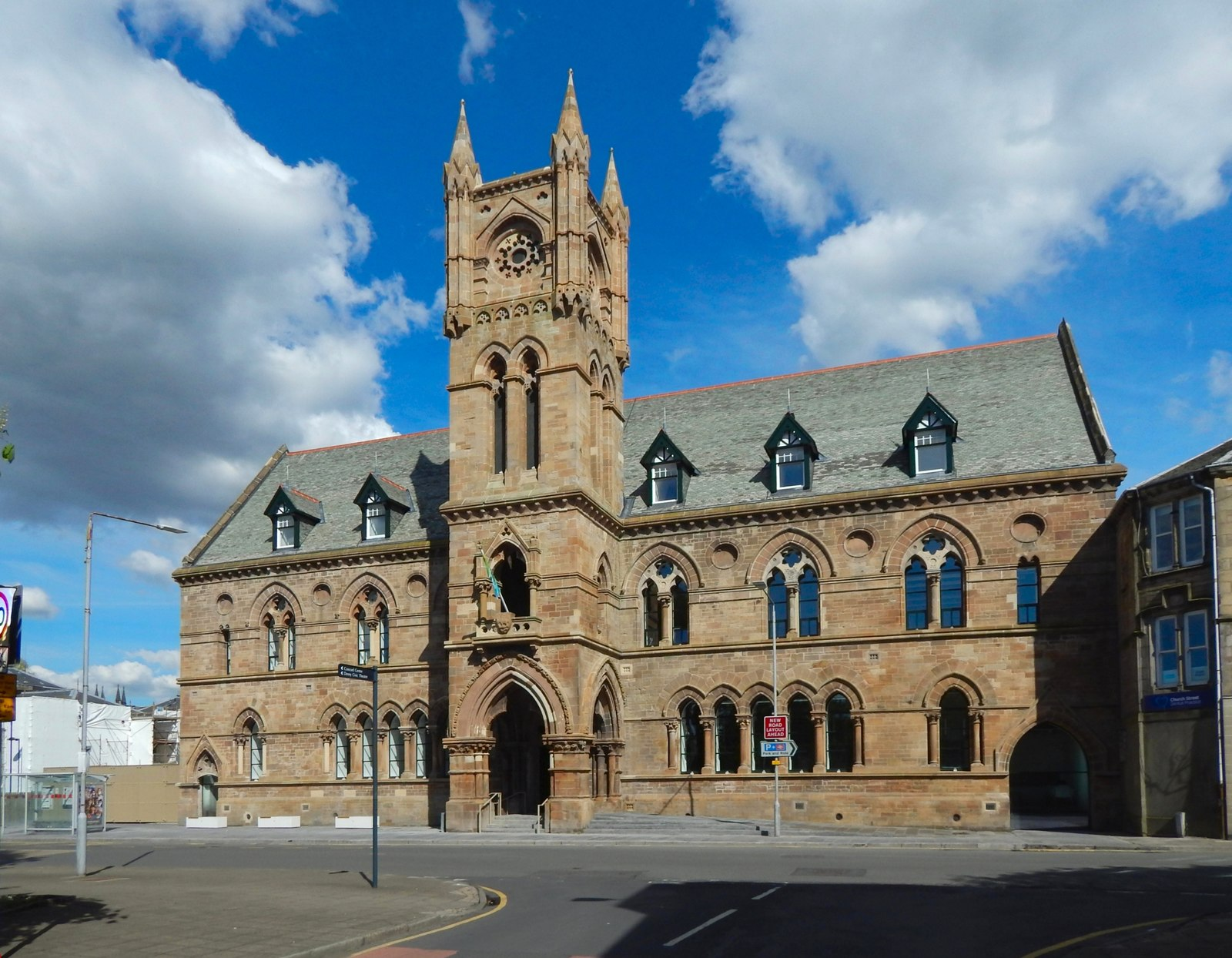
- The Old Burgh Hall and Academy, Dumbarton.

Location
- Crosslet Road; Dumbarton, West Dunbartonshire, G82 2AJ; Scotland; 55°56′49″N 4°33′32″W

Information
- Other name: Dumbarton Grammar School
- Type: Secondary school
- Motto: Fortitudo et Fidelitas (Strength and Loyalty)
- Established: c1485, 540 years old
- Local authority: West Dunbartonshire
- Head teacher: Alison Boyles
- Gender: Mixed
- Age: 11 to 18
- Enrollment: 500 (ish)
- Houses: Clyde; Fruin; Leven; Luss
- Colours: Royal Blue & Yellow
- Sports: Football, Hockey, Netball, Rugby
- Nickname: Dton Accies
- Alumni name: Old Dton Accies
- Website: https://sites.google.com/ourcloud.buzz/dumbarton-acad

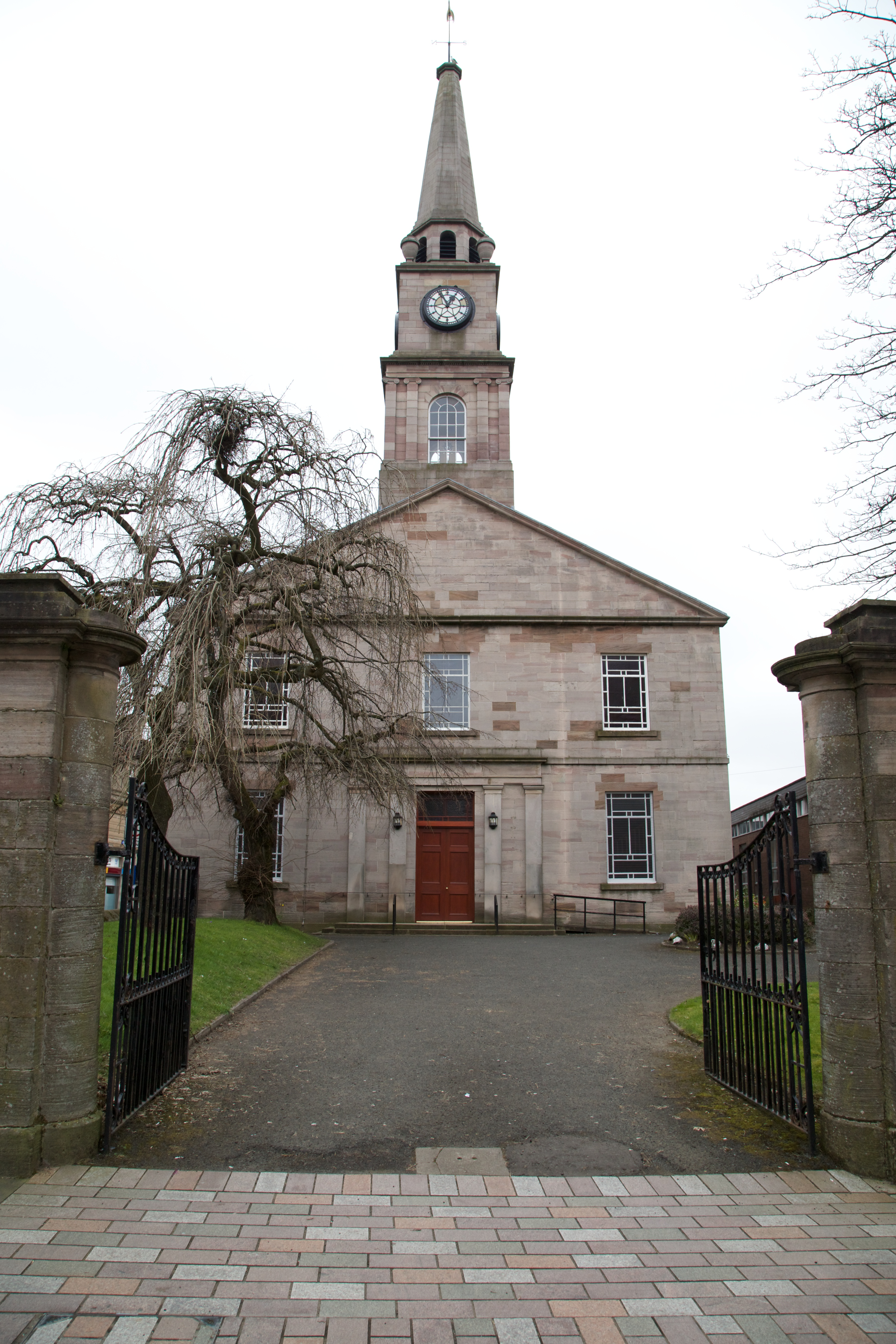
Dumbarton Parish Church; former location of Dumbarton Academy

Dumbarton Academy (formerly Dumbarton Grammar School) is a non-denominational, co-educational state secondary school founded circa 1485. The school is located in the Historical town of Dumbarton, Scotland.

== History ==
=== Early history ===
The earliest recorded reference to Dumbarton Academy, or Dumbarton Grammar School as it was formerly known, dates back to 1485. A charter from that year reveals that certain lands in Glasgow were bestowed upon the chaplain of St. Peter's Altar at the parish church of Dumbarton, accompanied by an endowment. This generous gift stipulated that the chaplain was to serve as the master of the Grammar School of Dumbarton.

However, the precise founding date of the school remains elusive, and it is widely speculated by scholars that the institution may have been established long before this earliest documented reference in 1485.

Matthew Forsyth is recorded as the inaugural schoolmaster and chaplain of St. Peter's Altar within the parish church of Dumbarton in 1512. For the following centuries, specifically during the 17th and much of the 18th century, the Grammar School occupied a series of chambers at the base of the parish church's tower.

=== 18th, 19th and early 20th centuries ===
By the late 18th century, the church was increasingly regarded as an unsuitable setting for the education of Dumbarton's young minds. In 1761, Robert Colquhoun, the incumbent schoolmaster, made a formal appeal to the Dumbarton Town Council, urging the establishment of a more fitting premises for the school. The council responded favourably, permitting Colquhoun to lease "Walker's Close", a structure located on Dumbarton High Street.

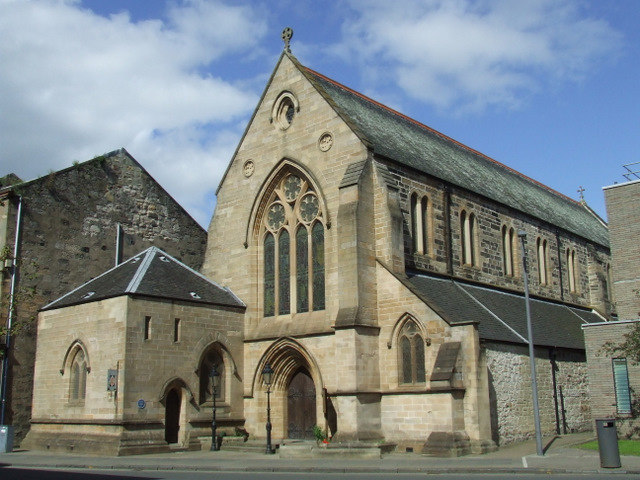
Former site of Dumbarton Grammar, now st. Augustine Church

In 1785, Dumbarton Grammar School was designate a parcel of land on the west side of Church Street for the purpose of constructing a new, purpose-built school building. In 1789, just four years later, a new school building was inaugurated on the site that now houses the St. Augustine's Church Halls.

From 1841 onwards the population of Dumbarton Burgh began to increase dramatically due to the expansion of shipbuilding on the Clyde during industrialisation and by 1860 it was apparent that new school premises were required.

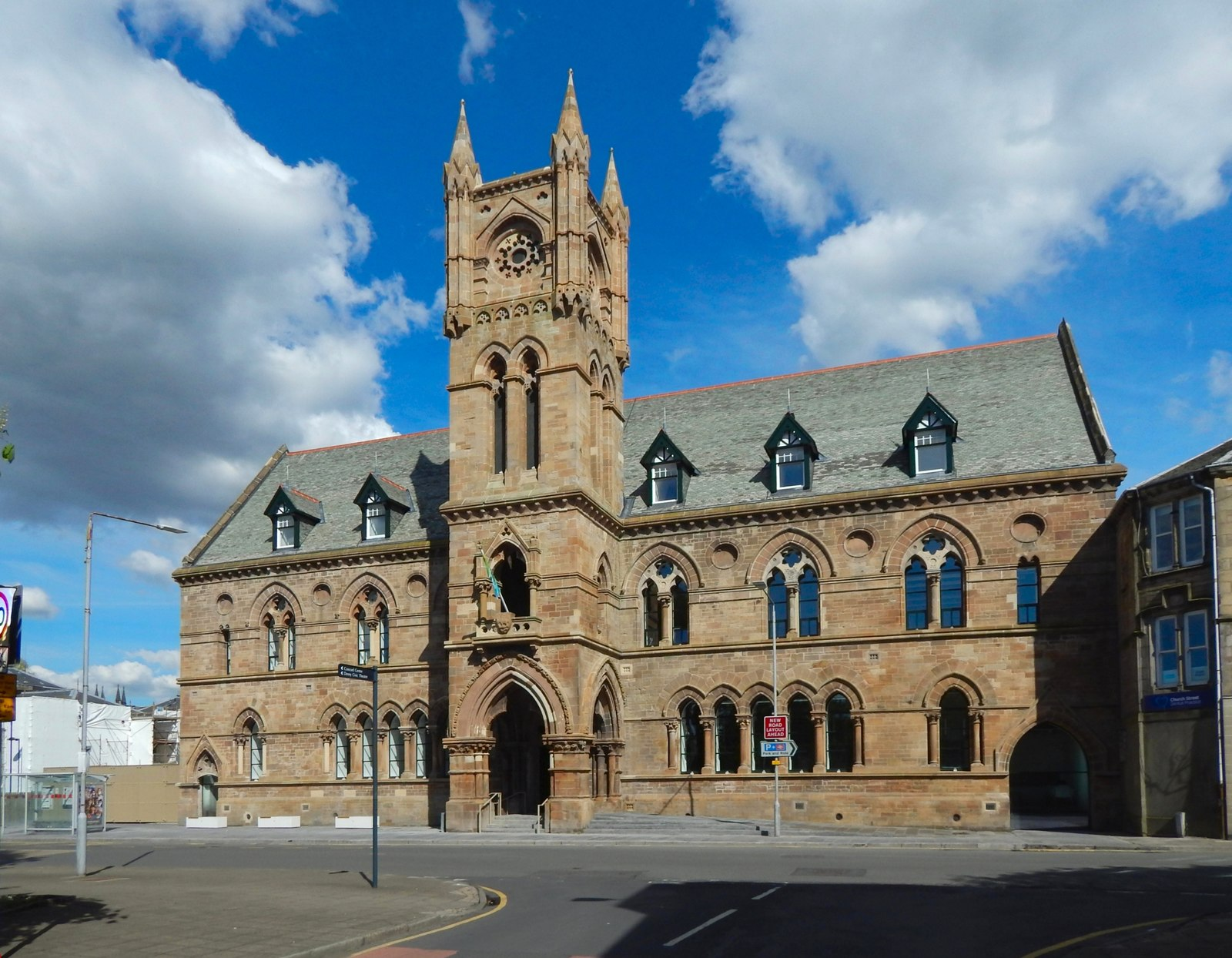
The Old Burgh and Academy Building

A new combined burgh hall and academy was erected in Church Street in 1866. Designed by the esteemed architects Robert Grieve Melvin and William Leiper in the Gothic Revival style, was constructed from ashlar stone and completed in two stages. The Burgh Hall was finished in January 1866, followed by the completion of the School itself in August of the same year.

In 1882, a devastating fire nearly destroyed the school building, forcing pupils to continue their education in temporary locations, including the nearby Burgh Hall. After two years of reconstruction, the rebuilt Academy on Church Street was officially opened on 15 September 1884.

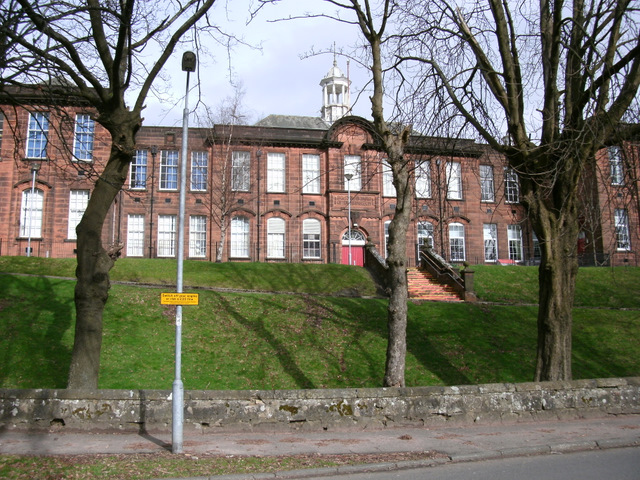
Former premises of Dumbarton Academy, now Braehead Primary School, Overlooking Dumbarton common

A new premises was opened, with a site selected that overlooked Dumbarton Common. The building was constructed on the grounds previously occupied by Braehead House and was officially opened in August 1914. As a result of the growing population on the Clyde due to the rapid expansion of the ship building industry, Dumbarton Academy now had to impose stricter entry requirements. This reorganisation meant the School only accepted those secondary school pupils who gained 60% or over in the qualifying examination.

=== Contribution to WW1 & WW2 ===
Dumbarton Academy made significant contributions during both World War I and World War II. In World War I, many former pupils and staff enlisted, and several were killed. The school supported the war effort by organizing fundraisers, collecting supplies, and maintaining morale through letters to the front. A memorial was erected to honour those who died. In World War II, former students joined the military, while the academy helped with civil defence and organized campaigns to collect supplies. The school also provided shelter for evacuated children.

A memorial was erected to honour those who died. This can be seen upon entering the current school building, showing the names of those who died.

=== Modern Restructuring ===
In the late twentieth century, in accordance with government reforms, Dumbarton Academy was reorganized into a free to attend state school. As a result, the academy moved to Crosslet Road, while Braehead School was repurposed as Braehead Primary School, accommodating younger pupils instead and acting as the main feeder school to Dumbarton Academy.

No longer a fee paying school, in 1985 the school celebrated its 500-year anniversary by putting on a concert and art display run by the pupils for the townsfolk. In addition to this a summer fair open to all was organised as a sign of appreciation to the local community.

== 21st century ==
=== Modernised premises ===
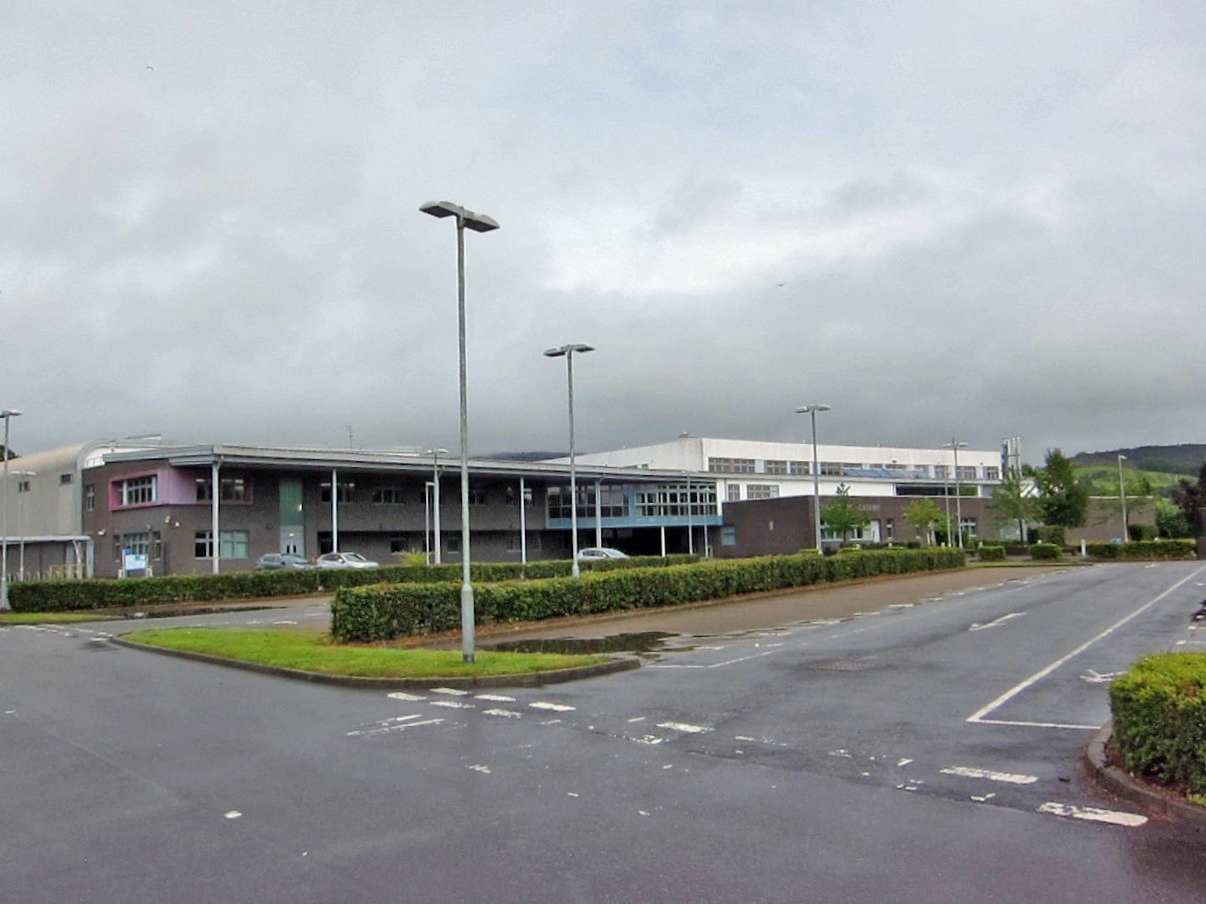
Modernised Dumbarton Academy premises opened 2013

Dumbarton Academy's new £15.5 million building, opened in 2013, features 57 classrooms, sports facilities, and a 'Walk of Life' timeline. The modern design supports improved learning and technology integration. The project was funded by the Scottish Futures Trust and West Dunbartonshire Council.

The new premises included a new theatre hall, gym, canteen, a modernised library, study spaces, multiple 3G pitches and a Sports hall named in honour of a former teacher who died before being able to see the new Facility.

=== Miscellaneous ===
The school received a positive report from the 2009 HMIE inspection.

Alison Boyles is the current head teacher. She is also the headteacher of Dalreoch primary school, maintaining both posts simultaneously.

In 2024 a teacher at the school published the book "The (Mis)adventures of a Dumbarton Maths' Teacher". The book reached number 1 on Amazon for political comedy. The book chronicles his time at the school since 1989. Described as a humorous insight into the life of a maths teacher, it sparked controversy after its release. Head teacher Alison Boyles sent a letter to parents informing them that the council was unaware of the book's existence and that it contained views not shared by the council or the school. An investigation was launched.

Dumbarton Academy's position in the Scottish Secondary School League Tables declined between 2016–17 and 2022–23.

== Uniform, Logo and Latin Motto ==
The schools colour are a royal blue and a contrasting bright yellow. Historically the school blazer was of royal blue colour. Now Dumbarton Academy's uniform includes a black blazer with additional blue ribbon for senior pupils at the school, white shirt, school tie, dark trousers or skirt, and black shoes. Students may also wear a school jumper or cardigan in colder weather.

The schools logo is a traditional shield shape that bears the depiction of an elephant bearing a castle upon its back at the top of the crest. The elephant is a prominent symbol within Dumbarton, likely being used as a symbol of strength and grandeur in medieval Europe. The association (some have claimed) is akin to the naming of Elephant and Castle in London though there is no evidence for this and why the elephant is such a prominent symbol in Dumbarton is mere speculation. On the bottom of the crest is depicted the dormant volcanic rock of Dumbarton. While the current logo bears no official heraldic authority, the school does not have an official coat of arms, historically speaking the school would use the official arms of the town of Dumbarton.

Dumbarton Academy's Latin motto is "Fortitudo et Fidelitas," which translates to "Strength and Loyalty."

== Enrolment and school houses ==
The school has an enrolment of just around 500 pupils split between 6 years.

Dumbarton Academy has four houses: Fruin, Clyde, Leven, and Luss. These houses are named after notable Rivers in the local area.

- Fruin – Named after the River Fruin, symbolizing energy and determination, with the house colour red
- Clyde – Named after the River Clyde, reflecting stability and trust, with the house colour blue.
- Leven – Named after the River Leven, symbolizing warmth and optimism, with the house colour yellow.
- Luss – Named after the River Luss, representing growth and harmony, with the house colour green.

== Notable faculty ==
- Raymond Robertson, Conservative MP 1992-1997 for Aberdeen South
- Paul Creaney, author of academic textbooks
- Bappi Bhattacharyya, author

== Notable alumni ==
Dumbarton Academy has produced a number of notable alumni who have gone on to make significant contributions in various fields. While not an exhaustive list, it highlights the most standout characters Dumbarton Academy has produced.

Perhaps the most internationally renowned is Sir Jackie Stewart, a three-time Formula 1 world champion. In the realm of literature, A. J. Cronin, a celebrated novelist and physician, left an indelible mark with works such as The Citadel and The Keys of the Kingdom.

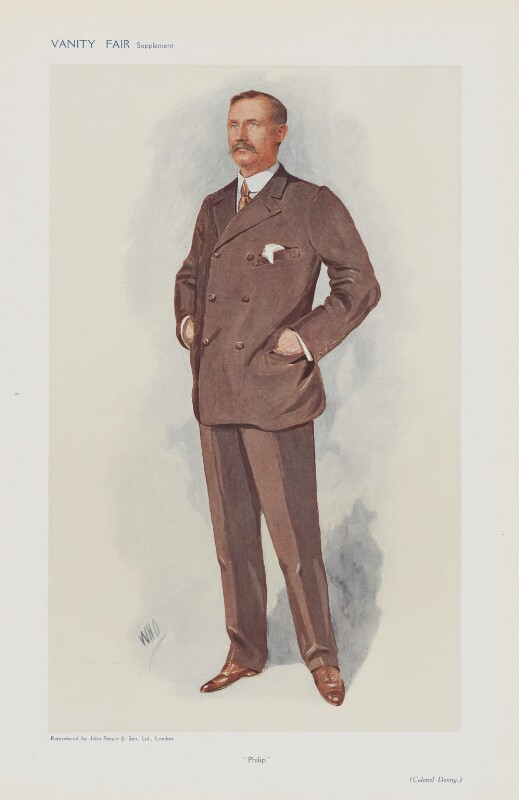
John McAusland Denny, Vanity Fair

The artist William Strang RA was educated at the school.

Old Dumbarton Accies have left their mark on politics too. David Steel, Baron Steel of Aikwood, was the leader of the Liberal Democrats & the first Presiding Officer of the Scottish Parliament. Similarly, Patrick Harvie, Co-Convenor of the Scottish Green Party was once a pupil at Dumbarton academy. Other Old dton Accies that are worth mentioning in the world of politics include John McAusland Denny(Historic Conservative MP), Paul Smith (who at the age of 14, founded a political party called the Scottish People's Workers Socialist party), John Hutcheson (New Zealand politician) and Ian Campbell (former Labour MP).

Douglas Gordon, a prominent Scottish contemporary artist, won the Turner Prize in 1996. Alongside him, William Strang, a gifted painter and etcher, gained recognition for his striking portraits and historical scenes.

In Academia the standout character is Professor John Campbell Brown, Regius Professor of Astronomy and Astronomer Royal for Scotland since 1995. Lastly, the realm of business and industry Dumbarton Academy can boast the Sir Archibald Denny, a key figure in the Clyde shipbuilding industry.

== See also ==
- List of the oldest schools in the United Kingdom
