= Robert Hope McCallum =

Entrepreneur and social figure in Auckland, New Zealand

Robert Hope McCallum (27 August 1864 – 28 June 1939) was a prominent builder, entrepreneur, and social figure in Auckland, New Zealand, during the late Victorian and early Edwardian periods.

Robert Hope McCallum

== Biography ==
=== Early life ===
McCallum was born in Dumbarton, Scotland, on August 27, 1864. He was the oldest of nine children born to Reverend Alexander and Margaret McCallum. In 1875, the family emigrated to the United States as a result of his father's poor health, settling in Northern California. Three years later, the family moved again, traveling on board the SS City of Sydney, arriving in Auckland in June 1878. Eight years later, his mother died suddenly at the age of 50 seized during a fainting fit; McCallum was 21 years old at the time.

=== Building career ===
Grand Hotel Rotorua

McCallum lived most of his life in the Auckland seaside community of Devonport, New Zealand. He constructed multiple buildings predominantly in Auckland as well as remote areas up to 500 miles away. The most notable project was the Grand Hotel Rotorua, constructed in 1893–1895. With 90 rooms, it was the largest provincial hotel in New Zealand at the time, accommodating guests such as the Prince and Princess of Wales and Ministers of the Crown. Other projects include the Takapuna Tramways, and the Hobson and Symonds Street brick shops. McCallum placed upwards of a hundred tenders (bids) during his time as a builder including successful submissions for the Auckland Harbour Board (later the Ports of Auckland) and Wingate and Co., a prominent hardware, general merchants, and iron store trading company.

=== Business career ===
In addition to his building career, McCallum was a well-known property speculator. He accumulated a significant portfolio of rental property in and around Auckland and acquired land as far away as Calgary, Canada, where he purchased raw prairie lots, which he later sold in 1912. He was also a diversified investor, holding stock in Wingate and Co. and Marky Films Ltd., an early producer of motion pictures and talkies.

=== Personal life ===
McCallum travelled extensively and often. In 1900, he travelled around the world to study architecture and again in 1911 to visit family and friends. Over his lifetime, passenger logs list him as traveling to Sydney, Melbourne, Paris, the Pacific Islands, Tahiti, Palestine, Egypt, the United States, Canada, and his Mother Country (Scotland and England).

In 1905, at the age of 40, McCallum married Henrietta (Hetty) West, who was 18 years his junior. They had their first child, Ivan, a year later, quickly followed by a daughter, Valerie, and another son, Bruce.

=== Community and Social Life ===
McCallum was active in community affairs. In 1893, he made an unsuccessful bid for a council seat on the Devonport Borough Council and was a long-time member of the North Shore Athletic Association. He was a bicycling enthusiast and a member of the Cycling Club, competing in many competitions. McCallum was an avid participant in lawn bowling and a member of the Devonport Bowling Club for many years.

McCallum lived a life not without controversy and navigated various skirmishes with the police over the years. In 1903, he was charged with willfully permitting the use of one of his properties as a brothel. He appeared in court on multiple occasions for minor infractions, including shooting at a pack of dogs, disembarking a ferry prematurely, and leaving construction equipment unattended in public space.

=== Death ===
McCallum died of pneumonia on June 28, 1939, at the age of 74 while abroad in Sydney, Australia. Though he had three children, he left no heirs. Ivan, his firstborn son, died from typhoid at the age of three; Valerie went on to marry, but died childless at the age of 65; and Bruce died in 1943, aged 34, after his plane was shot down over Belgium during World War II
