= Our Lady and St Patrick's High School =

Our Lady & St Patrick's High School

Location
- Howatshaws Road, Bellsmyre; Dumbarton, G82 3DR; Scotland
- Coordinates: 55.959900°N 4.552163°W

Information
- Type: Comprehensive School
- Motto: Uniter Deo (Union with God)
- Religious affiliation: Catholic
- Established: 1990
- Authority: West Dunbartonshire
- Head teacher: Christopher Smith
- Faculty: 100
- Gender: Co-educational
- Age: 11 to 18
- Enrollment: 949
- Colours: Green and blue, light blue and yellow
- Accreditation: Investors in People, Schools of Ambition
- Examination board: Scottish Qualifications Authority
- Website: OLSP homepage

Our Lady & St Patrick's High School is a six-year co-educational comprehensive Roman Catholic school, situated in the Bellsmyre area of Dumbarton, Scotland. It is the only denominational secondary school for Dumbarton, the nearby Vale of Leven Community and Helensburgh.

== History ==
The school's origins can be traced back to the closure of two previous Roman Catholic single-sex schools in the area: St. Patrick's (an all-boys school) and Notre Dame (an all-girls school). In 1990 the two were merged into a new school, using the newer buildings of Notre Dame in the Castlehill neighbourhood on the west side of Dumbarton (completed in 1969). In order to represent both of the previous schools, the new name "Our Lady and St. Patrick's" was chosen.

Previously, a local convent had a large influence in the school as they previously managed the all-girls school Notre Dame, which was incorporated into it. The school colours, green and blue were chosen from the existing schools and are the colours most commonly associated with the namesake religious figures; blue for the Virgin Mary and green for St. Patrick.

== 21st century ==
In 2017, a new campus was constructed for the school at a cost of £25 million, located in the northern edge of the town at Bellsmyre (the location was previously occupied by four residential tower blocks). The Castlehill campus was demolished the following year.

The school enjoys a healthy reputation amongst the community as a school of high achievement with some year groups experiencing a regular pass rate of 95% in exams. The school serves the catchment of Dumbarton, Alexandria, Balloch, Helensburgh and the Rosneath peninsula.

The school is currently providing educational services for around 1100 pupils and the current headmaster is Chris Smith, who assumed the role with the retirement of previous headmaster Charles Rooney in 2014.

== Philosophy ==
Like all Catholic schools in Scotland, Our Lady and St. Patrick's conforms with the "Charter for Catholic Schools in Scotland", a set of guidelines set down by the Scottish Government. Our Lady and St Patrick's is a major part of the Catholic community for its relatively large catchment area and regularly performs a celebration of mass for events such as local Primary 7 graduation into the school and for Remembrance Day commemorations.

== Notable former pupils ==
- Morgan McMichaels (b. 1981) - professional drag performer and contestant in RuPaul's Drag Race, season two
- Caroline Glachan (b. 1982) - murdered while a pupil
- Zander Diamond (b. 1985) - professional footballer, Burton Albion F.C.
- Ryan Conroy (b. 1987) - professional footballer, Dundee F.C.
- Jim O'Brien (b. 1987) - professional footballer, Notts County F.C.
- Cardinal Keith O'Brien (1938-2018) - Archbishop of Saint Andrews and Edinburgh (attended St. Patrick's High School prior to merging)
