= Castlehill, Dumbarton =

Area of West Dunbartonshire, Scotland

Coordinates: 55.95055°N 4.59512°W

Castlehill is an area of Dumbarton in the West Dunbartonshire area of Scotland. Located in the Western part of the town next to the Brucehill area, Castlehill was built as a council run housing scheme. Many of the houses have subsequently been bought by the tenants, reducing the number of houses still in the tenure of the local authority.

This area of Dumbarton also has two Primary schools, St. Michaels Primary & Dalreoch Primary.

Castlehill is the former site of a castle dating from several hundred years ago. There is the suggestion that this may have been the site of the manor house that Robert the Bruce built in 1326 and died in 1329, however it seems more likely such a manor house would have been closer to the River Leven. Castlehill is also the former site of a monument (the area is known locally as `the mony`) to Robert Bontine Cunninghame Graham. The monument has been removed and a plaque detailing the information is in its place. In recent years, Castlehill has undergone small-scale residential development and community renewal projects supported by West Dunbartonshire Council. The area now features improved public amenities and pedestrian access connecting it to nearby Dalreoch and the River Leven walkway.

Historically, the district has been associated with Dumbarton’s shipbuilding heritage, as many residents once worked in the Clyde shipyards. Today, Castlehill maintains a mix of traditional housing and modern council estates, reflecting its transition from a post-industrial neighborhood to a growing suburban community.
