= Dumbarton East, Dumbarton =

Coordinates: 55.948°N 4.552°W

Dumbarton East is an area of the town of Dumbarton, Scotland. It mainly consists of Victorian-era sandstone buildings built by the Denny shipbuilding company to house its workers. Within this area is Dumbarton Castle and the Bet Butler Stadium - home of Dumbarton F.C.

Dumbarton Castle sits on Dumbarton Rock at the point where the River Leven joins the River Clyde. The Castle has played a significant historical role and many well known figures from Scottish and British history have been associated with it. These include Mary, Queen of Scots, William Wallace and Queen Elizabeth II.

Dumbarton Rock is a geological formation known as a "volcanic plug", formed by prehistoric build up of igneous Basalt.

The Bet Butler Stadium, home of Dumbarton F.C., is located in Dumbarton East. The stadium was built in 2000 as a replacement for the aging Boghead Park.

The area is served by Dumbarton East railway station which is accessed from Glasgow Road.

== Silverton ==
Silverton is a large housing scheme in Dumbarton East, Scotland, located between Dumbarton Rock and Dumbuck Hill and Round Riding Road to the north. It derives its name from the farm upon which it is now located.

It is predominantly a residential area, with both public and private housing stock. Due to its relatively flat geography, the public sector housing was often let to the elderly and infirm of Dumbarton, but now houses a mix of those and commuters to the largest city in Scotland, Glasgow, not far from the town. Dumbarton Academy, the nondenominal public secondary school (though predominantly Protestant) and St. Patrick's Primary School are situated in Silverton, as is the Brock Bowling Club. Dumbarton East railway station is nearby, and so is the East End Park football pitch.

There are three newsagent Shops (one of them has a post office), and a Fish & Chip and Pizzeria take-away shop. There is also a swing park in an area known as The Dam.
