= Dumbarton =

Coordinates: 55.95°N 4.566667°W

Dumbarton: Scottish Gaelic: Dùn Breatann
- Town
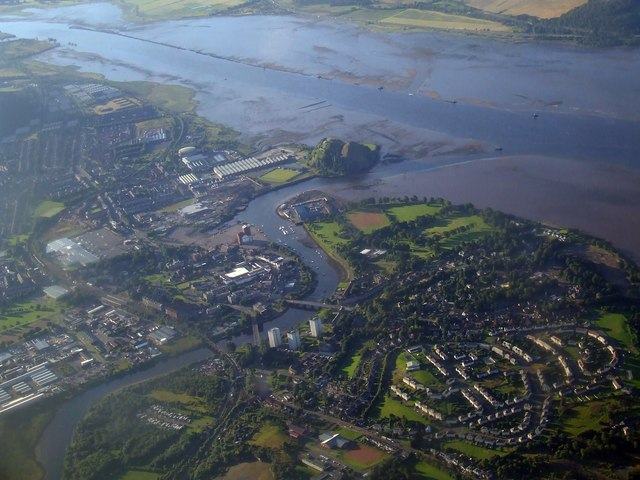
- Aerial view of Dumbarton

- Location within West Dunbartonshire
- Population: 20,480 (2020)
- OS grid reference: NS397759
  - Edinburgh: 54 mi (87 km) E
  - London: 356 mi (574 km) SSE
- Council area: West Dunbartonshire
- Lieutenancy area: Dunbartonshire
- Country: Scotland
- Sovereign state: United Kingdom
- Post town: DUMBARTON
- Postcode district: G82
- Dialling code: 01389
- Police: Scotland
- Fire: Scottish
- Ambulance: Scottish
- UK Parliament: West Dunbartonshire
- Scottish Parliament: Dumbarton

Dumbarton (/dʌmˈbɑːrtən/; Scottish Gaelic: Dùn Breatann [t̪um ˈpɾʲɛht̪ən̪ˠ]) is a town in West Dunbartonshire, Scotland, on the north bank of the River Clyde where the River Leven flows into the Clyde estuary. In 2006, it had an estimated population of 19,990.

Dumbarton was the capital of the ancient Kingdom of Strathclyde, and later the county town of Dunbartonshire. Dumbarton Castle, on top of Dumbarton Rock, dominates the area. Dumbarton was a royal burgh between 1222 and 1975.

Dumbarton emerged from the 19th century as a centre for shipbuilding, glassmaking, and whisky production. However, these industries have since declined, and Dumbarton today is increasingly a commuter town for Glasgow 13 miles (21 km) east-southeast of it. Dumbarton F.C. is the local football club.

== History ==
=== Early history ===
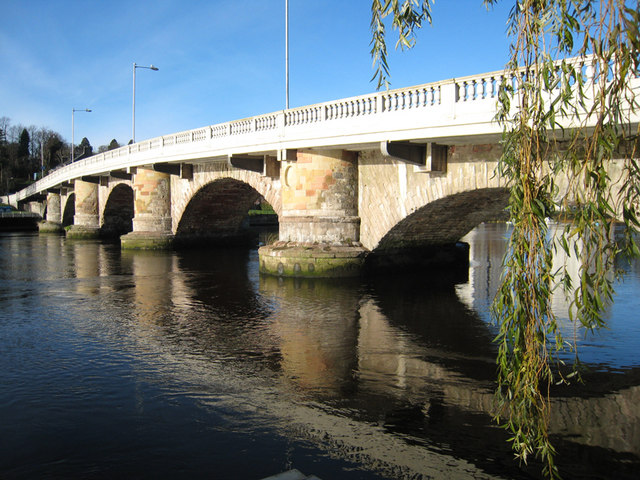
The Old Dumbarton Bridge over the River Leven.

Dumbarton history goes back at least as far as the Iron Age and probably much earlier. It has been suggested that in Roman times Dumbarton was the "place of importance" named as Alauna in Ptolemy's historic map. Dumbarton is also sometimes associated with the little-known, and hard to place, Roman province of Valentia. However, more recent studies favour locations in England or Wales for this province. In post-Roman times the settlement at Dumbarton was known as Alcluith, there is a record in Irish chronicles of the death of Guret, rex Alo Cluathe ("king of Clyde Rock"), in AD 658.

Rhydderch son of Tudwal was a powerful Christian King who reigned at Dumbarton in the late sixth century. He is recorded as fighting against the heathen Angles in Northumbria, and was the patron of St. Kentigern, "apostle of Strathclyde and founder of the bishopric of Glasgow". The fortress of Dumbarton was the stronghold of the kingdom of Alclud, and the centre of Breton power in northern Britain, for more than two centuries from the mid-seventh century, until the Vikings destroyed the fortress after a four-month siege in 870. The loss of the British power base led to the emergence of the new kingdom of Strathclyde, or Cumbria, with a major centre at Govan. The title "king of the Britons of Srath Clúade" was first used in 872. Dumbarton was later the county town of the county of Dunbartonshire, formerly known as Dumbartonshire. The name comes from the Scottish Gaelic Dùn Breatainn meaning "fort of the Brythons (Britons)", and serves as a reminder that the earliest historical inhabitants of Clydesdale spoke an early form of the Welsh language.

=== 13th century to 19th century ===
Hartfield House was completed in 1853. Alexander II granted the status of royal burgh in 1222.

In September 1605 Chancellor Dunfermline reported to King James VI that inundations of the sea were likely to destroy and take away the whole town. It was estimated that the flood defences would cost 30,000 pounds Scots, the cost being levied nationwide.

A bridge over the River Leven had been proposed in 1682. The Old Dumbarton Bridge was eventually built in 1765 by John Brown of Dumbarton, at the site of a ferry crossing. It was constructed at the behest of the Duke of Argyll, who was anxious to obtain access to Glasgow from his estate at Rosneath. The bridge, with five segmental arches with rounded cutwaters, resulted in the extension of Dumbarton to West Bridgend. The bridge was substantially developed in 1884 and 1934. It is now B-listed and was refurbished in 2006.

=== 20th century ===
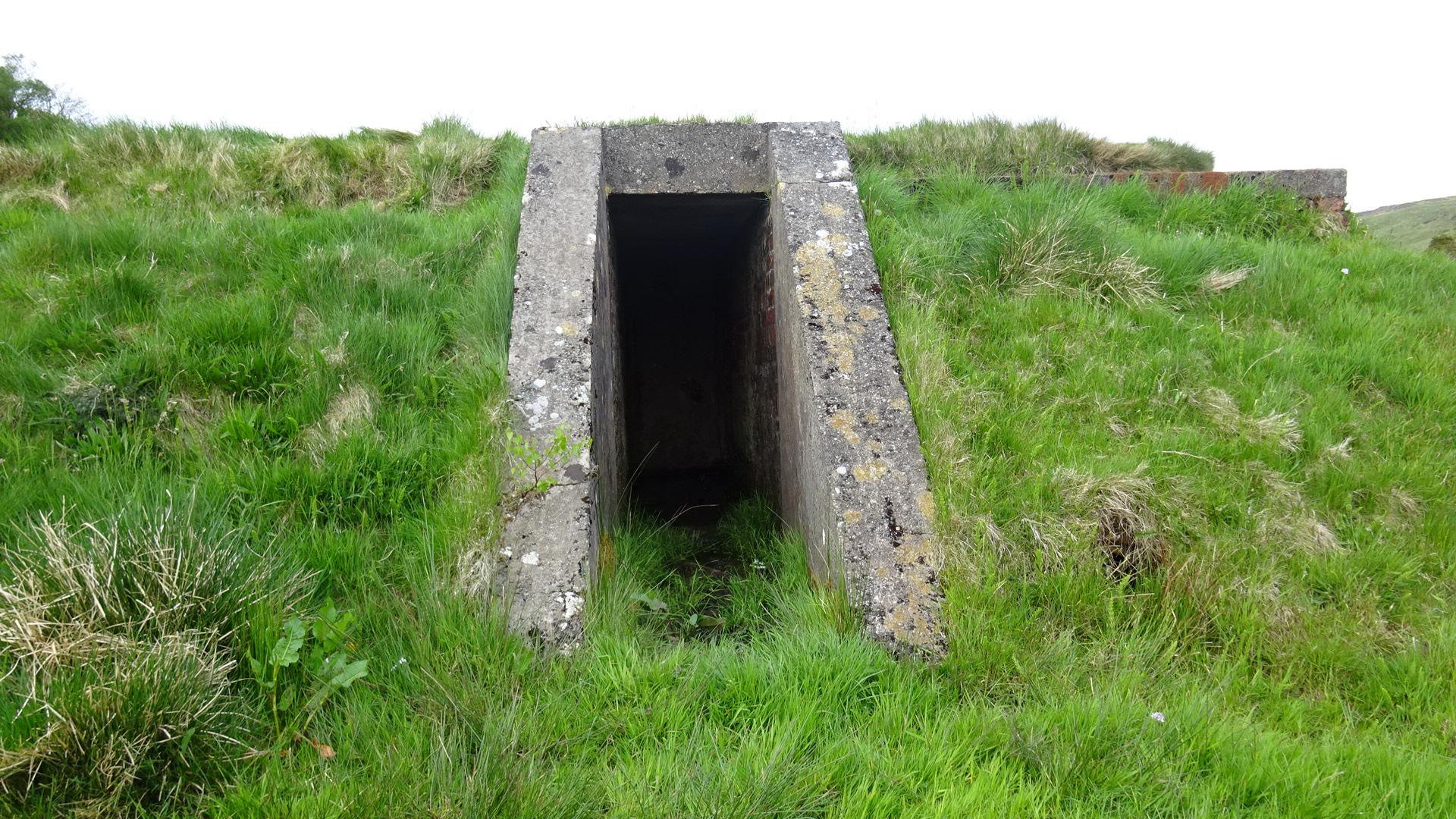
The entrance to the Auchenreoch Muir "Starfish" decoy control bunker.

During World War II Dumbarton was heavily bombed by the German air force. The Germans were targeting the shipyards, and the area in the vicinity of the yards was consequently hit, with Clyde and Leven Street being severely damaged. In an attempt to lure the German aircraft away from the shipyards, decoy lights were routinely placed on the Kilpatrick hills above the town, lights were set out on reservoirs to mimic those of the shipyards reflecting on the waters of the Leven and Clyde. The ploy was sometimes successful in diverting the bombers and many bombs fell harmlessly onto the moors and lochs. The Auchenreoch Muir 'Starfish' site above Dumbarton was part of a system of decoy fires operated by the RAF that used pyrotechnics to simulate the appearance of the incendiaries dropped by the German pathfinder aircraft, thereby diverting the bombers from their intended targets. 23 bomb craters are still identifiable in the area around the surviving control bunker as evidence of the success of the diversion.

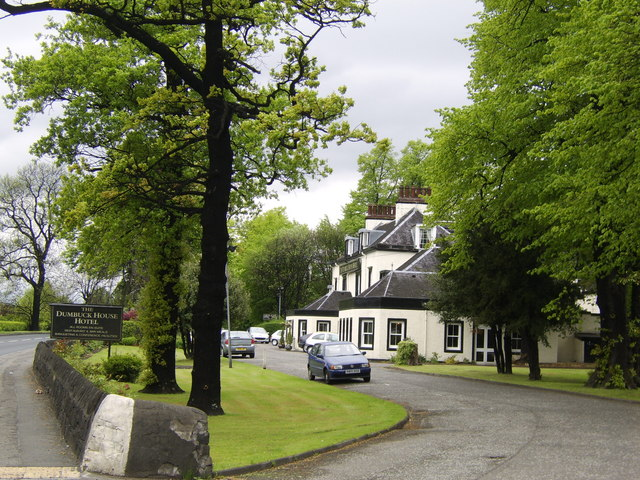
Dumbuck House (with later extensions) as a hotel in 2007. The Category B listed building was demolished in 2024 following two major fires that left it severely damaged.

The one time village and estate of Dumbuck now lie partly within the boundary of Dumbarton, while the remaining portion comprising the associated Dumbuck Hill and its large incorporated quarry (Dumbuck Quarry) are treated here together with the neighbouring village of Milton, as the next adjacent generally recognised locality today. In the Dumbarton portion, the Category B-listed Dumbuck House, originally constructed for Colonel Andrew Geils, was the original estate house and was converted into a hotel in the 20th century. It was destroyed in a fire in 2024 and subsequently demolished. For additional information regarding the Dumbuck estate, including mention of the somewhat bizarre Kosmoid Company that occupied the estate for a short while, refer the article on Andrew Geils. Information on the well known "Dumbuck Crannog" archaeological feature is presently included in the Wikipedia article for Milton Island.

=== Castle ===
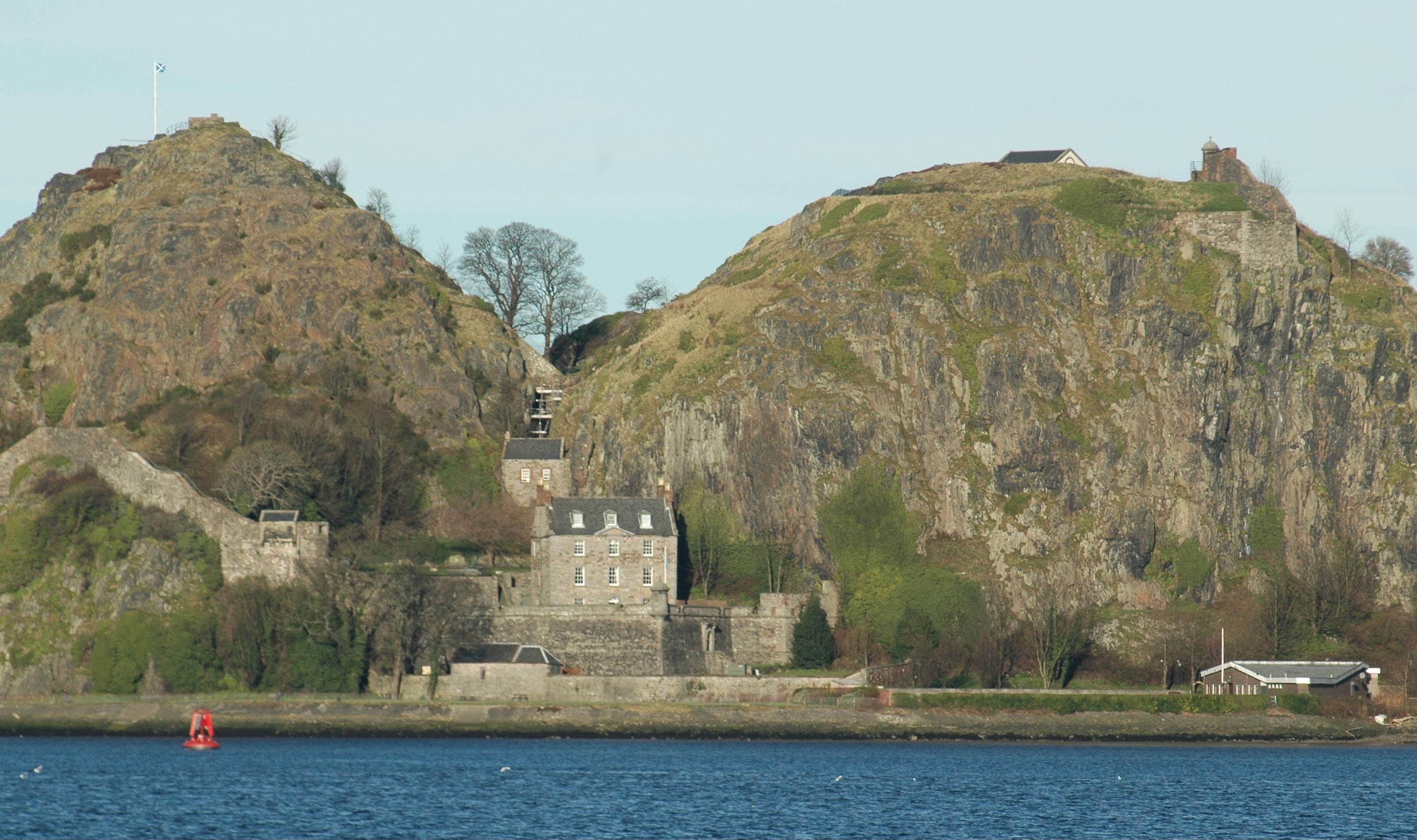
Looking across the River Clyde towards Dumbarton Castle

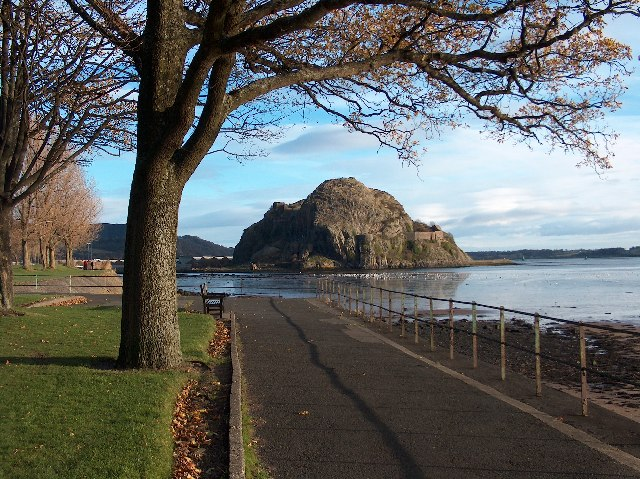
Dumbarton Rock from the west

Dumbarton Castle sits on Dumbarton Rock, a volcanic plug dating back 334 million years, at the east bank mouth of the River Leven, where it flows into the Clyde estuary.

The Castle has an illustrious history and many well-known figures from Scottish and British history have visited it. The castle was a royal fortress long before Dumbarton became a royal burgh; its ownership went from Scottish to English and back again. The castle was an important place during the Wars of Independence and was used to imprison William Wallace for a short time after his capture by the English. It was from here that Mary, Queen of Scots, was conveyed to France for safety as a child. Mary was trying to reach Dumbarton Castle when she suffered her final defeat at Langside. In later times, Queen Victoria and Queen Elizabeth II visited the castle.

Today, Dumbarton Rock and the castle are a scheduled monument; it has legal protection in order to maintain and conserve the site for the future. As such any sort of work on the rock is strictly regulated by the Scottish Government and activities such as climbing on the rock are forbidden. From the top of the castle can be seen both the River Clyde and Leven Grove Park.

=== Levengrove Park ===
Levengrove Park was developed in 1885 on grounds of the former Levengrove Estate by the Denny and McMillan families who owned shipbuilding companies with yards located adjacent to the Castle, and gifted to the town.

A grave site in the park sits as the resting place for the viscera of former Scottish king Robert the Bruce. Removal of these "viscera" for local burial was commonplace at the time, when a person's remains were to be transported a long distance for their own burial.

== Geography and governance ==
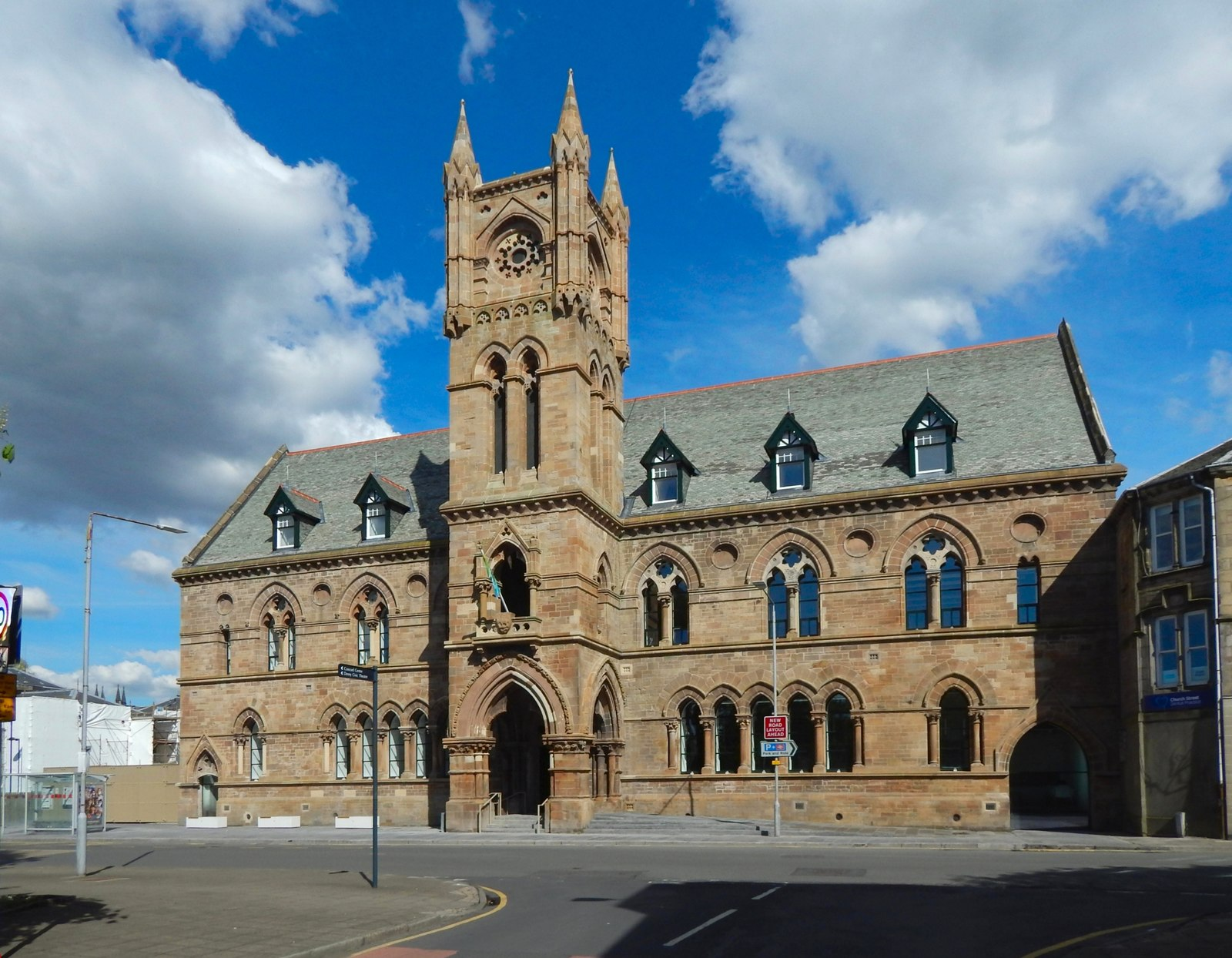
Dumbarton Burgh Hall

Dumbarton's Civic Coat of Arms

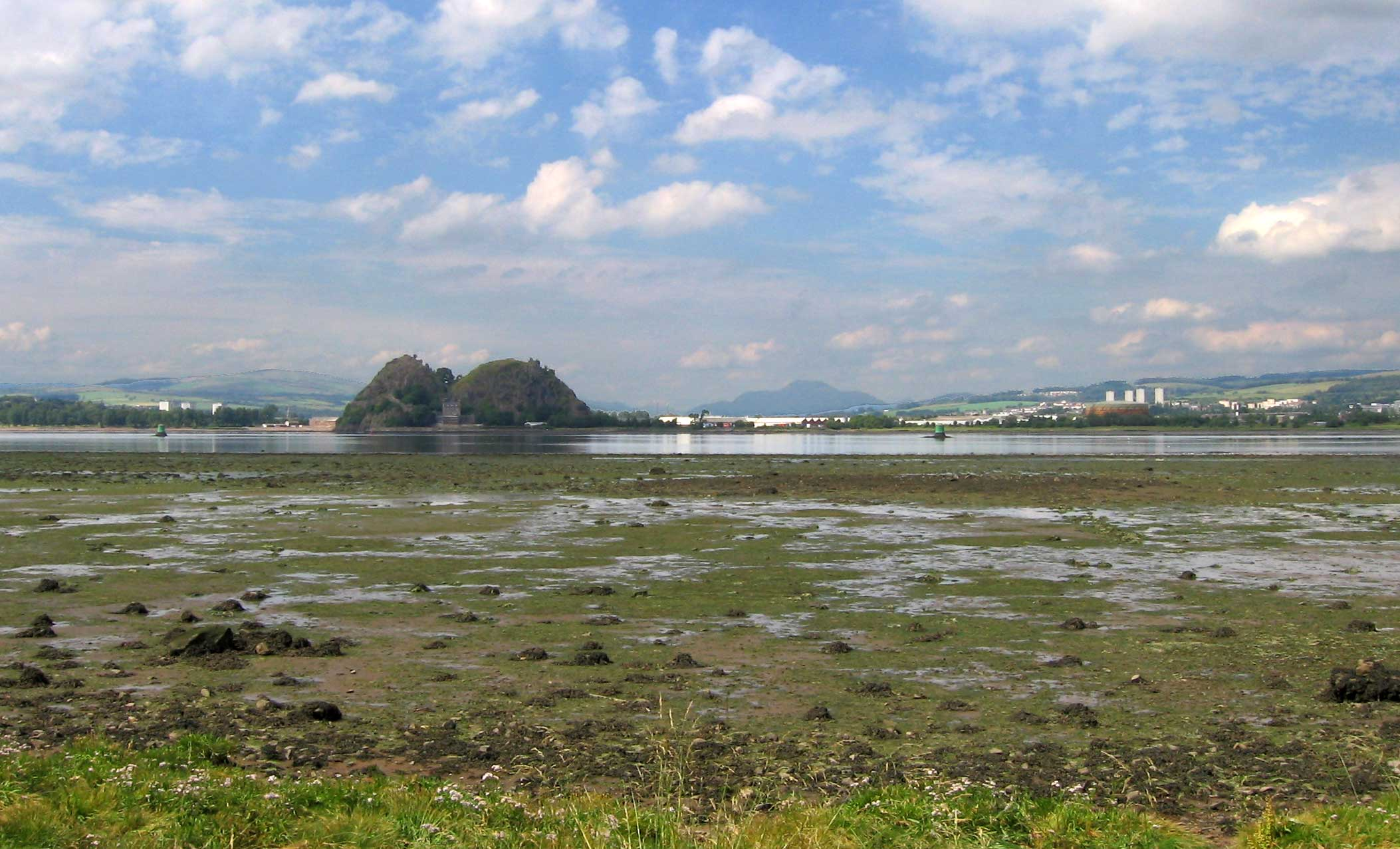
A northwards view of Dumbarton across the tidal River Clyde, with the distant Ben Lomond visible to the right of Dumbarton Rock

From 1975 Dumbarton lent its name to a local government district in the Strathclyde region of Scotland. In 1996 the administrative functions of this district transferred to the West Dunbartonshire and Argyll and Bute unitary councils (see Subdivisions of Scotland). West Dunbartonshire Council is based in modern offices within the old Dumbarton Burgh Hall in Church Street.

There is a Dumbarton constituency of the Scottish Parliament and a former Dumbarton constituency of the House of Commons.

=== Districts ===
There are a number of distinct areas within the town:

- Barnhill
- Bellsmyre
- Brucehill
- Castlehill
- Dumbarton East incl. Newtown
- Garshake
- Kirktonhill
- Levengrove
- Oxhill
- Silverton
- Townend
- Westcliff
- West Bridgend

== Education ==
Two secondary schools are located in Dumbarton, namely Dumbarton Academy and Our Lady & St Patrick's High School. The town is also served by eight primary schools; Aitkenbar Primary, St. Michael's Primary, Knoxland Primary, Braehead Primary, St. Peter's Primary, St. Patrick's Primary and Dalreoch Primary.

== Economy and transport ==
=== Shipbuilding ===
From the mid 18th century to the early 19th century Dumbarton's main industry was glassmaking. As the glass industry declined the town became a major centre for shipbuilding and remained so well into the 20th century. There were many shipbuilding yards, although a number of them were later absorbed by larger yards. A great many ships were built in the town, the most famous of which is probably the Cutty Sark which was built by Scott & Linton, she was one of the final Tea Clippers to be built, and one of the fastest. The ship is the last survivor of its type and can be seen today at dry dock in Greenwich, London.

=== William Denny and Brothers ===
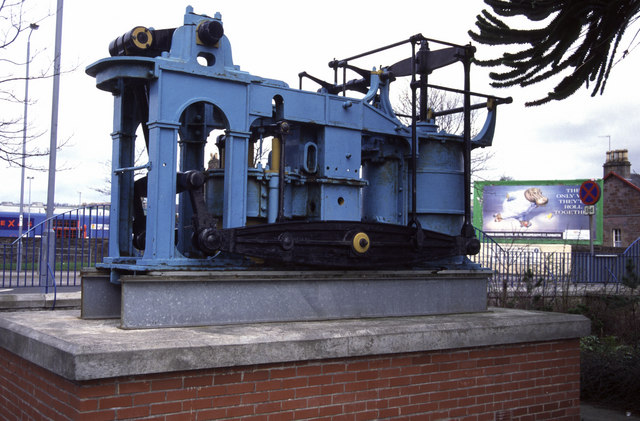
Early side-lever engine designed by Robert Napier, from PS Leven (1823), on display at the Scottish Maritime Museum

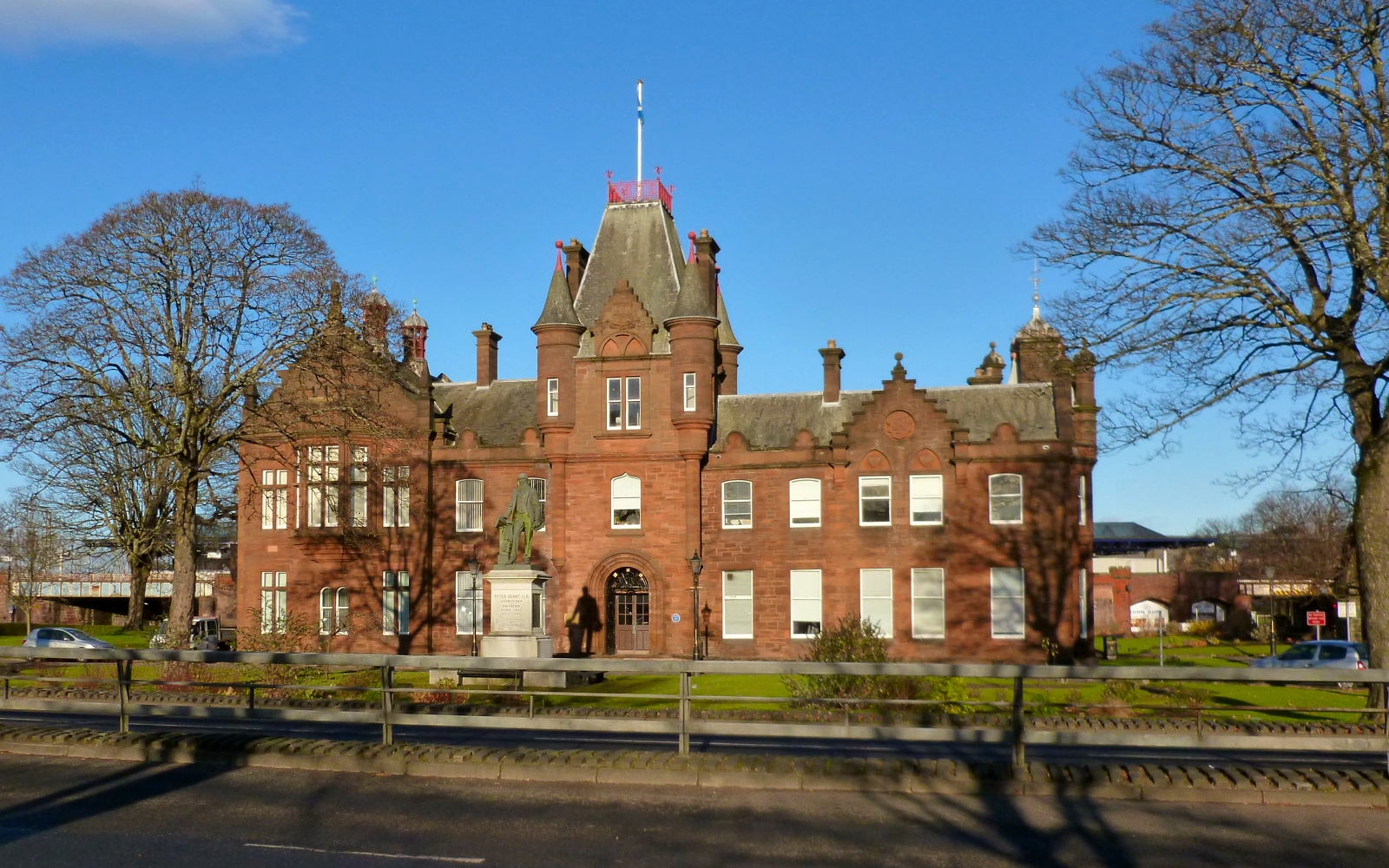
The Municipal Buildings with the statue of Peter Denny in front

The last major Dumbarton shipyard was William Denny and Brothers which closed in 1963, and the remaining smaller yards followed over the next few decades. Until recently, the old Denny's shipyard tender The Second Snark was still in use on the Firth of Clyde as a passenger ferry and cruise boat. Denny's was an innovative company that had a reputation for research and development; high-pressure turbines and hull stabilisation were two areas where they were highly respected. They even built an early design of helicopter in 1909 and in their final years they were involved in hovercraft development in the form of the Denny D2 Hoverbus. A film clip of this vessel on its maiden trip to Oban exists in the Scottish Film Archive.

The last surviving part of the Denny's shipbuilding company is the Denny Ship Model Experiment Tank which forms part of the Scottish Maritime Museum. This was the first commercial ship model testing tank built in the world and it retains many original features today: a water tank as long as a football pitch, clay moulding beds for casting wax model ship hulls and the original Victorian machinery used for shaping models.

During the Second World War Blackburn Aircraft were to produce Sunderland flying boats from a factory adjacent to Denny's shipyard.

There is still a shipyard on the river Leven, Sandpoint Marina. A statue of the shipbuilder and shipowner, Peter Denny, stands outside the Municipal Buildings.

=== Whisky ===
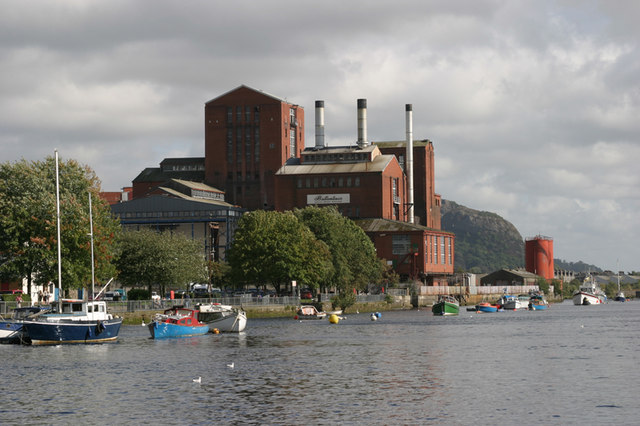
The skyline of Dumbarton used to be dominated by the red-brick former Ballantine's grain distillery.

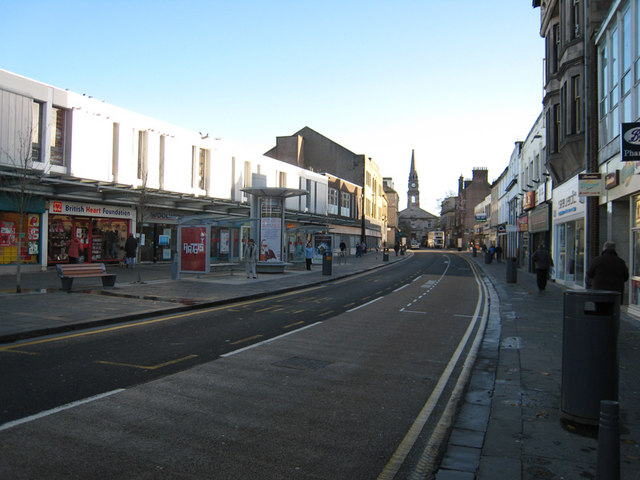
Dumbarton town centre, 2006.

Whisky production has become a major industry in the town. In 1936 Canadian distilling company Hiram Walker bought over the Glasgow-based distiller George Ballantine & Son Ltd. In 1938 they built a large grain whisky distillery on the river Leven (on the site of the Archibald McMillan shipyard) named the Inverleven distillery. As a result, the town became known as a major centre of the whisky industry in the mid to late 20th century. The distillery at the height of its production was the largest grain distillery in Europe. Hiram Walker itself was acquired by Allied Breweries in 1988 to form Allied Distillers, itself becoming part of Allied Domecq before eventually being taken over in 2005 by the French-based alcohol giant Pernod Ricard. The large Dumbarton distillery had been mothballed since 2002 and not long after the Pernod-Ricard takeover the giant red-brick buildings of the Dumbarton 'Ballantine's' distillery which had dominated the town for over sixty years were earmarked for demolition and redevelopment, the remains of the distillery were demolished throughout January and February 2017. The site was redeveloped mostly into new housing and flats. The large bonded warehouse complex to the east of the town and the bottling complex to the north-west were retained.

Ballantine's Whisky became well known for the rather unusual 'security' guards used at their bonded warehouse complex at Dumbuck in Dumbarton; these are a large flock of white Chinese geese that were first introduced in 1959. Starting with just six individuals, this has risen to close to 100 birds today. They have the nickname 'The Scotch watch' and have been widely used in promotional material for the Ballantine's blended whisky. The geese are part of the tradition of the facility, and are both a tourist attraction and advertising icon. The Goosekeeper at the time (as of 1996) was Arthur Carroll, but as of 1997 they have been replaced by CCTV cameras.

Other whisky-related site closures such as the J&B Scotch Whisky bottling plant and bond in the north of the town have contributed to the decline in Dumbarton's importance to the drink industry. However, part of the J&B bond has found a new life as a film set for television productions such as 'River City, Still Game and Two Doors Down.

==== Inverleven distillery ====
Inverleven distillery was a Single malt Scotch whisky distillery in operation with the grain distillery at the Hiram Walker Leven site from 1938. It had 3 stills and also made gin. It closed in 1991.

=== Other industries ===
With the decline of the whisky industry, Dumbarton is becoming more a commuter town for those who work in nearby Glasgow and other locations. The Faslane naval base is a major employer for the area. The Strathleven Industrial Estate near Dumbarton was once the location of several major manufacturers such as Burroughs (Adding Machines) and Westclox. Technology overtook these companies and they closed down with the loss of many jobs.

The estate has also been the home of Polaroid UK since 1965. This was the largest Polaroid plant outside the US and at its peak it employed about 1800 people. Failing to recognise the impact of digital photography was its downfall and while they still have a presence in Dumbarton, fewer than 100 people are now employed there (mainly in the manufacture of sunglass lenses). The generator supplier Aggreko plc has had a facility in the town since the 1970s, in 2012 it opened a new, larger facility at the former J&B plant.

Dumbarton is currently home to BBC Scotlands Studio. However, in 2025 BBC Scotland said it planned to close Dumbarton Studios when its lease for the facility ends in September 2026.

=== Transport ===
Dumbarton is situated on the main A82 road, linking Glasgow to the western Scottish Highlands and is a short distance from Balloch pier, where cruises can be taken on Loch Lomond. Dumbarton is also served by three railway stations: Dumbarton Central, Dumbarton East and Dalreoch railway station. All three stations are on the North Clyde Line, and link Helensburgh in the west and through Glasgow Queen Street to Edinburgh Waverley in the east.

=== Media ===
Nation Radio Scotland, the local commercial radio station for West Dunbartonshire is based in the town, having moved from Clydebank in 2016. It formerly was named Dumbarton Festival Radio, Castle Rock FM until 2003, and then Your Radio until 2020.

The town has two local weekly newspapers, The Lennox Herald and The Dumbarton Reporter.

== Culture ==
=== Sports ===
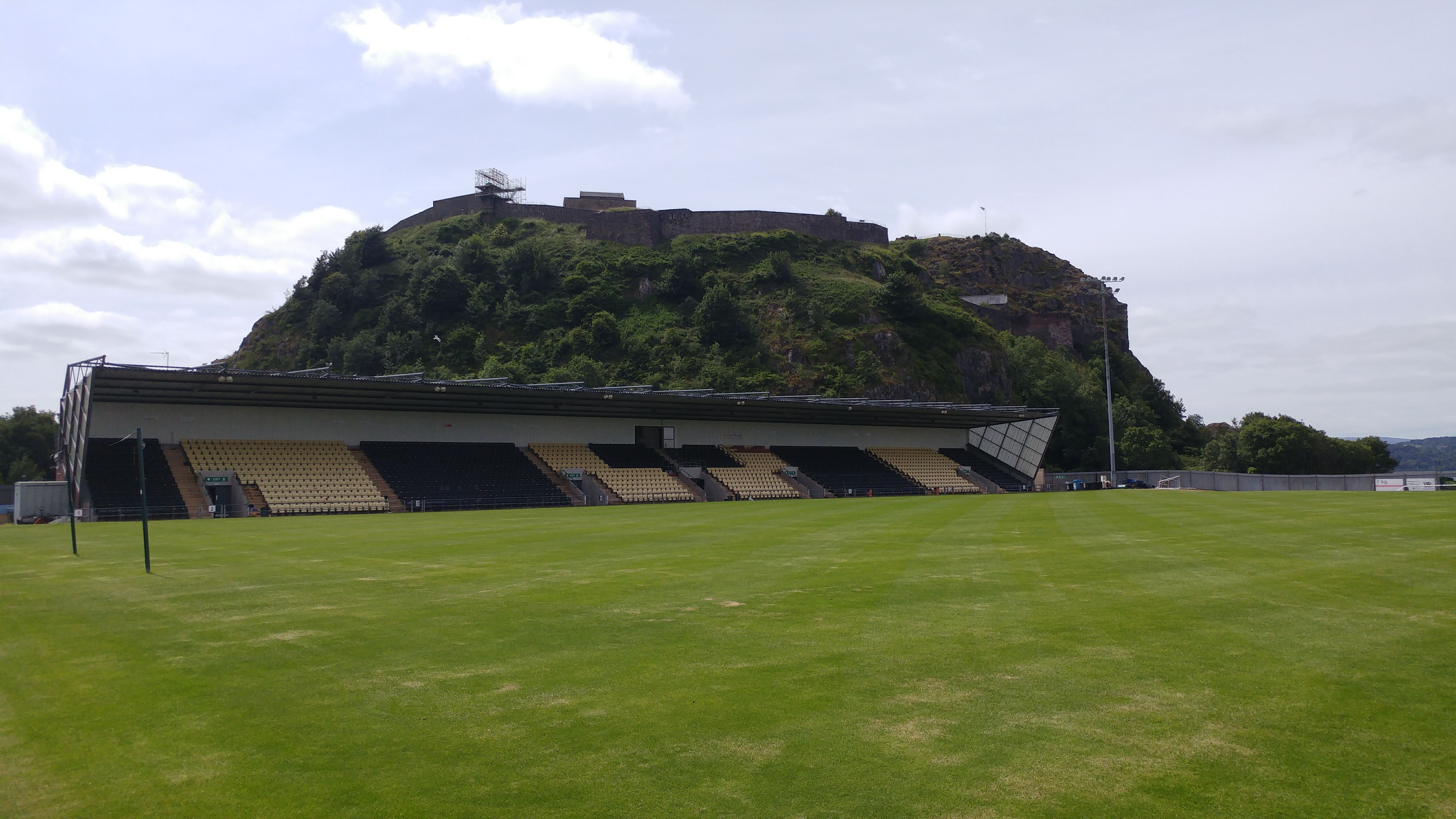
Stand at the Dumbarton Football Stadium in the shadow of Dumbarton Rock, home of Dumbarton F.C.

There were at one stage two league football clubs from the town, Dumbarton Harp F.C and Dumbarton F.C (Also known as 'Sons of the Rock'). Dumbarton F.C. are the only league club in Dumbarton still in operation, playing in the Scottish Professional Football League at Scottish League Two level.

Dumbarton F.C play home games at the Dumbarton Football Stadium (known since 2018 as the C&G Systems Stadium for sponsorship reasons) adjacent to Dumbarton Rock. They won the 1882–83 Scottish Cup and are five times runners-up.

The Scottish League was formed in 1890 with Dumbarton as founding members. The first championship was shared between Dumbarton and Rangers, in the absence of a goal-difference rule to act as a tiebreaker.

There are seven bowling clubs in Dumbarton: Brock Bowling Club, Dixon BC, Dumbarton BC, Dumbuck BC, Eastfield BC, Rock BC and Townend BC.

The town is the birthplace of the motor-racing driver Sir Jackie Stewart OBE. He competed in Formula One between 1965 and 1973, winning three World Drivers' Championships. The Stewart Family owned and ran the garage at Dumbuck in Milton to the East of the town, the Garage later being taken over by Jackie's close friend John Lindsay.

=== Arts ===
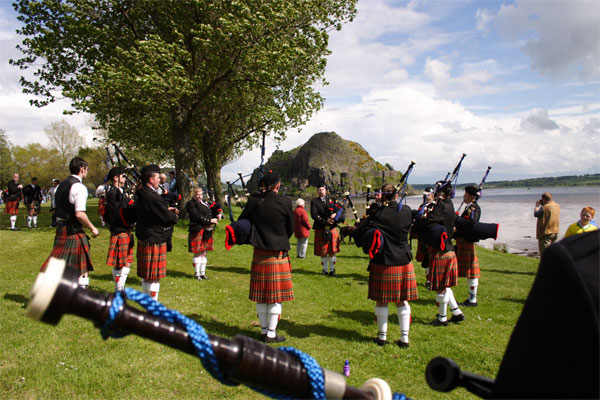
The Royal Scottish Pipe Bands Championships, Dumbarton

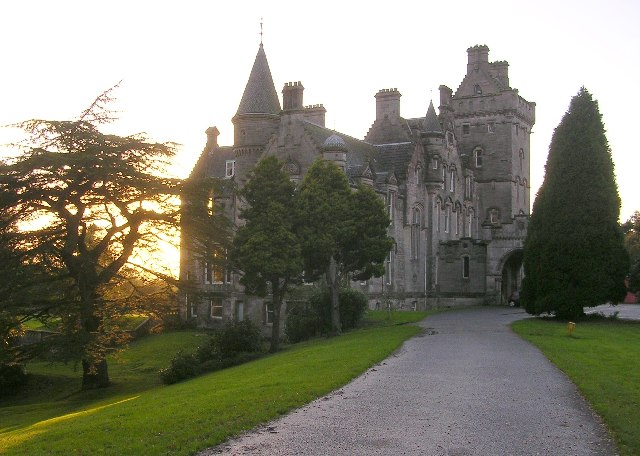
Overtoun House is now an A-listed building.

Scottish poet Robert Burns was made freeman of Dumbarton. He refers to Dumbarton in a letter written on 7 July 1787.

"... I have lately been rambling over by Dumbarton and Inverary, and running a drunken race on the side of Loch Lomond with a wild Highlandman; his horse, which had never known the ornaments of iron or leather, zigzagged across before my old spavin’d hunter, whose name is Jenny Geddes, and down came the Highlandman, horse and all, and down came Jenny and my bardship; so I have got such a skinful of bruises and wounds, that I shall be at least four weeks before I dare venture on my journey to Edinburgh."

Dumbarton is also immortalised in the traditional Scottish song "Dumbarton's Drums".

Across the fields of bounding heather,
Dumbarton sounds the hour of pleasure;
The joy I know will know no measure,
When Johnnie kneels and kisses me. (one verse)

The song was recorded by the internationally renowned Midgies Ceilidh Band at a live concert in Saint Augustine's Church in the town's High Street, the chorus being sung by the audience of local people.

Novelist A. J. Cronin's maternal grandfather, Archibald Montgomerie, owned a hat shop at 145 High Street.

Dumbarton is the birthplace of David Byrne, a Grammy Award, Academy Award and Golden Globe-winning musician best known as the founding member and principal songwriter of new wave band Talking Heads.

=== Royal Scottish Pipe Band Championships ===
Held in Dumbarton since 2000, the Royal Scottish Pipe Band Championships sees over 140 bands enter yearly, including representatives from Sweden, Denmark, Netherlands and Ireland. The championships is one of the biggest and most prestigious pipe band events in the world. Besides the pipe band championships there is a funfair and Highland dancing competitions.

=== Theatre ===
The Denny Civic Theatre is used by a number of local groups, including the Dumbarton People's Theatre.

=== Overtoun House ===
Overtoun House is a mansion in the Scots Baronial style built on an estate in the hills overlooking the town between 1859–1862 for a wealthy chemical manufacturer originally from Glasgow, John Campbell White.

== Notable people ==
- David Byrne (born 1952), Musician (Talking Heads)
- Marcus Campbell (born 1972), snooker player
- Jessie Campbell (1827–1907), pioneer for women's higher education
- Lewis Deeney (born 1994), Artist
- Zander Diamond (born 1985), footballer for (Aberdeen F.C., Oldham Athletic A.F.C., Burton Albion F.C.)
- Jane Duncan (1910–1976), novelist
- Scott Duncan (1888–1976), Football player (Newcastle United F.C., Ipswich Town F.C.) and manager (Manchester United F.C., Ipswich Town F.C.)
- Mountstuart Elphinstone (1779–1859), Historian and civil servant.
- Richard Gilmour (1824–1891), former bishop of Cleveland
- Douglas Gordon (born 1966), Artist
- George Harcourt (1868–1947), Portrait painter
- Margaret Harrison (1918–2015), Peace Campaigner
- Patrick Harvie (born 1973), MSP
- Darian Mackinnon (born 1985), Footballer
- John William Madden (1865–1948), Footballer
- Robert Hope McCallum (1864-1939), Scottish builder and entrepreneur
- Jimmy McCulloch (1953–1979), Musician (Paul McCartney and Wings, Thunderclap Newman, Stone the Crows)
- John McFall (born 1944), politician
- Columb McKinley (1950–2021), - Footballer for Vale of Leven FC, Airdrieonians FC and Dumbarton FC.
- Prince Harry and Meghan Markle became the Earl and Countess of Dumbarton upon their marriage on 19 May 2018.
- Charles O'Neill philanthropist and engineer
- Eric Russell (1936–2026), England test cricketer
- Jackie Stewart (born 1939), Formula 1 racing driver
- Paul Stewart (born 1965), racing driver
- William Strang (1859–1921), painter and printmaker
- David Ward (1922–1983), Opera singer, known internationally for Wagner and Verdi roles
- Evan Williams (1943–2025), footballer, goalkeeper for Glasgow Celtic FC

== See also ==
- List of places in West Dunbartonshire
- Scotch watch (geese)
- Milton Island and the Dumbuck Ford
