= River Leven, Dunbartonshire =

Stretch of water in West Dunbartonshire, Scotland

River Leven
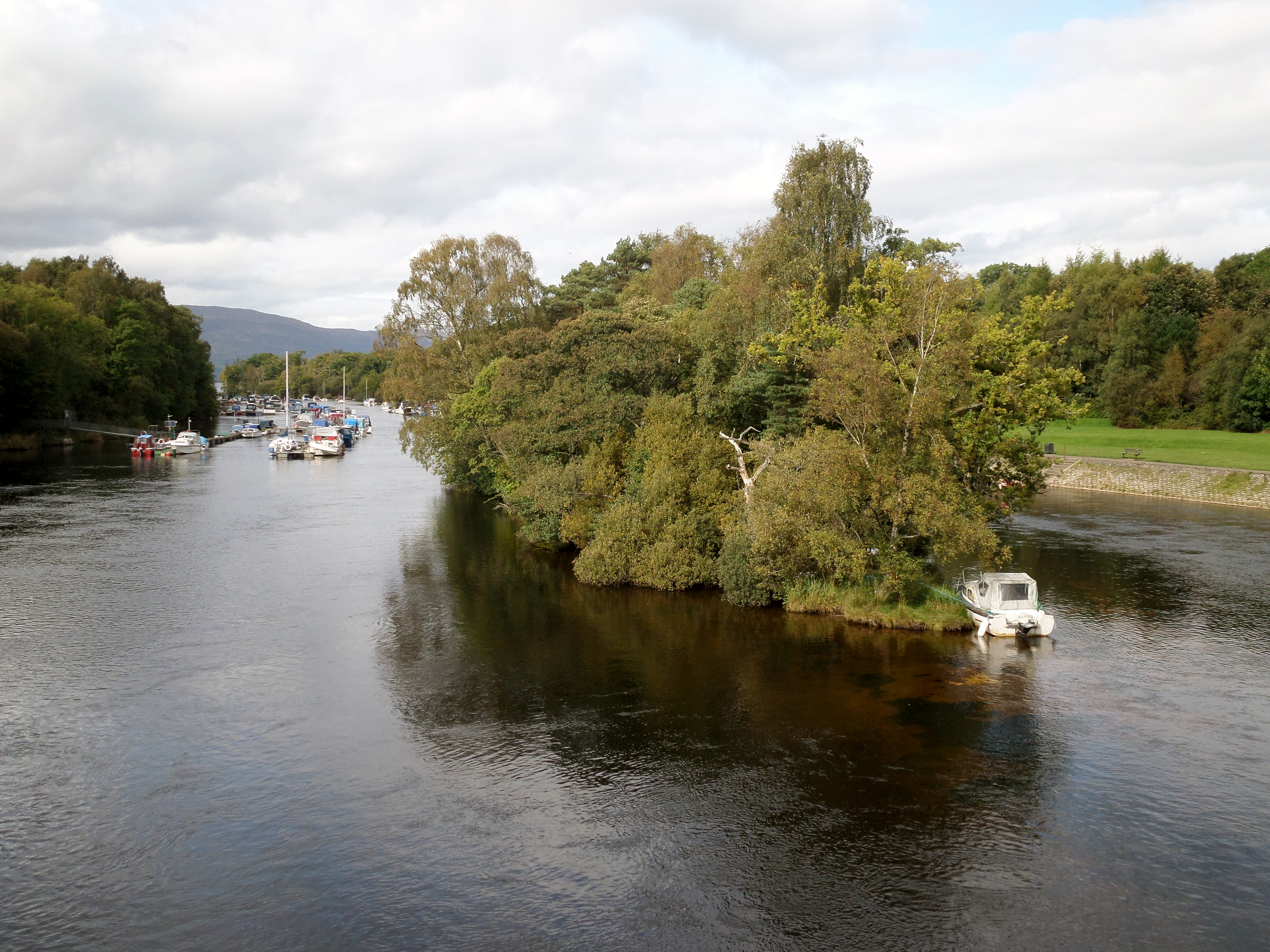
- The River Leven at Balloch, looking north towards Loch Lomond
- Native name: Uisge Leamhna (Scottish Gaelic)

Location
- Country: United Kingdom (Scotland)

Physical characteristics
- Source: Loch Lomond
  - coordinates: 56°00′31″N 4°35′21″W
- Mouth: Firth of Clyde
  - coordinates: 55°56′18″N 4°33′53″W
- Length: 6 mi (10 km)

Basin features
- Cities: Balloch, Alexandria, Renton, Dumbarton

The River Leven (Scottish Gaelic: Uisge Leamhna) is a stretch of water in West Dunbartonshire, Scotland, flowing from Loch Lomond in the north to the River Clyde in the south. The river is about 6 miles (10 km) long. It is very popular with salmon and sea trout anglers, trying to catch one of these migratory fish going up to Loch Lomond.

The Vale of Leven is a collection of communities in the northern part of the river, whilst the town of Dumbarton sits at the southern end. Dumbarton Castle sits at the confluence of the river with the Clyde. The Leven is a relatively short river but is widely claimed to be the second fastest flowing river in Scotland, after the River Spey. Possibly because of this, or possibly because it passes through a built-up area, it has a reputation as a dangerous river with many drownings over the years. The Linnbrane Hole in Alexandria is reputed to be the most dangerous spot.

The river is crossed by nine bridges and two weirs. There is a path for pedestrians and cyclists near the river, which connects with a cycle path to Glasgow. It follows the river very closely from Balloch to Renton, less closely from Renton to Dumbarton. The river includes two large meander bends, at Cordale and Dalquhurn.

In the past the river was used to get steamers into Loch Lomond, although they sometimes did not find it an easy journey and could have difficulty getting past the bridges. Nowadays the river is considered to be not navigable. The height of the river can vary, sometimes being a good deal higher in winter than summer.

== See also ==
- List of places in West Dunbartonshire
- William Denny and Brothers
