= Brucehill =

Housing estate in Dumbarton, Scotland

Coordinates: 55°56′44″N 4°35′10″W

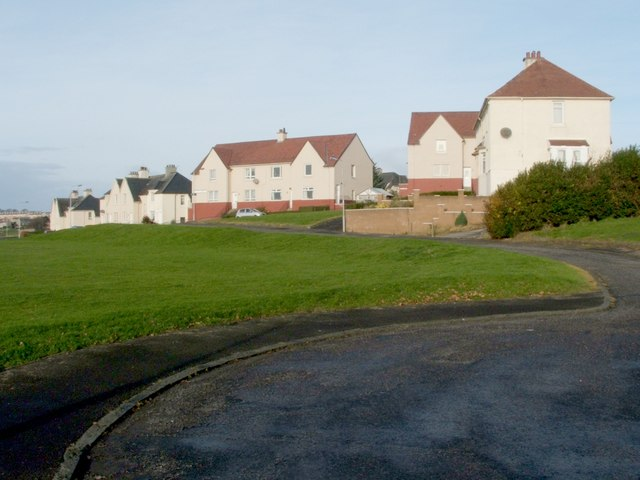
Firthview Terrace, Brucehill

Brucehill is a council estate in Dumbarton, in the West Dunbartonshire area of Scotland.
