= List of listed buildings in West Dunbartonshire =

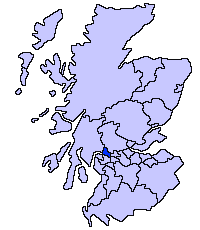
West Dunbartonshire shown within Scotland

This is a list of listed buildings in West Dunbartonshire. The list is split out by parish.

- List of listed buildings in Bonhill, West Dunbartonshire
- List of listed buildings in Cardross, West Dunbartonshire
- List of listed buildings in Clydebank
- List of listed buildings in Dumbarton, West Dunbartonshire
- List of listed buildings in Kilmaronock, West Dunbartonshire
- List of listed buildings in Old Kilpatrick, West Dunbartonshire

== See also ==
- List of Category A listed buildings in West Dunbartonshire
- Scheduled monuments in West Dunbartonshire
