= Dumbarton (district) =

Former local government district in Scotland

Coordinates: 56.01°N 4.63°W

- District
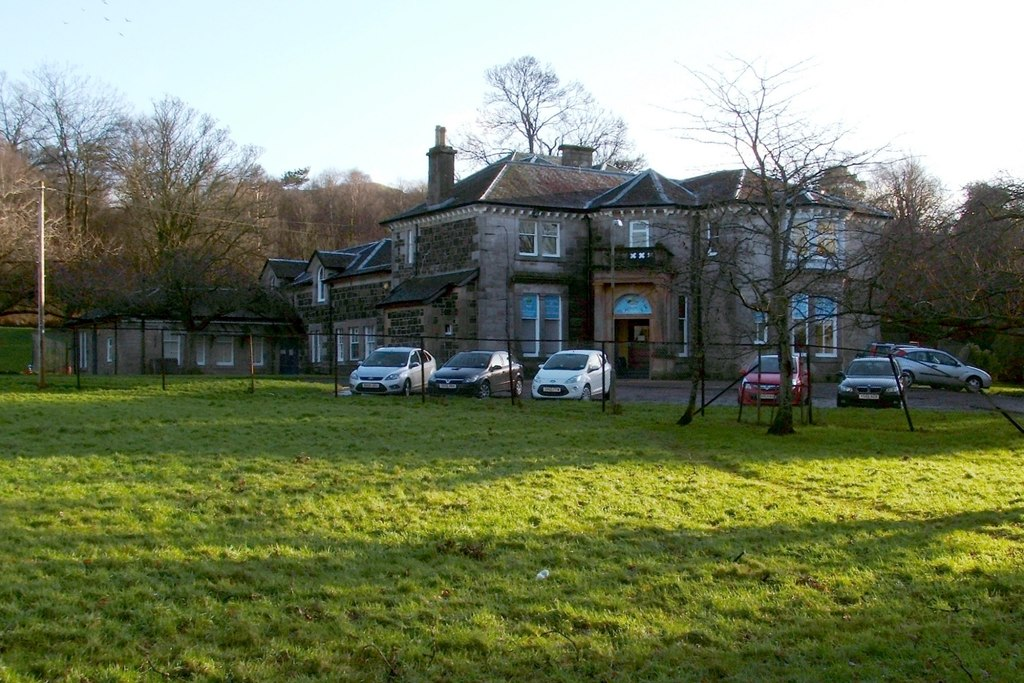
- Council's headquarters: Crosslet House, Dumbarton

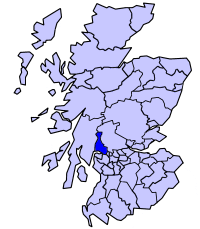
- Dumbarton district within Scotland
- Population
  - 1994: 77,222
- History
  - Created: 16 May 1975
  - Abolished: 31 March 1996
  - Succeeded by: (Part of) West Dunbartonshire (Part of) Argyll and Bute
- Government: Dumbarton District Council
  - HQ: Dumbarton

Dumbarton (Scottish Gaelic: Dùn Breatainn) was, from 1975 to 1996, one of nineteen local government districts in the Strathclyde region of Scotland, covering the town of Dumbarton and surrounding areas to the north-west of Glasgow.

== History ==
The district was created in 1975 under the Local Government (Scotland) Act 1973, which established a two-tier structure of local government across mainland Scotland comprising upper-tier regions and lower-tier districts. Dumbarton was one of nineteen districts created within the region of Strathclyde. The district covered the whole area of five former districts and part of a sixth from the historic county of Dunbartonshire, which were all abolished at the same time:

- Cove and Kilcreggan Burgh
- Dumbarton Burgh
- Helensburgh Burgh
- Helensburgh District
- Old Kilpatrick District: the Bowling and Dunbarton electoral divisions
- Vale of Leven District

The main urban areas were Dumbarton and the Vale of Leven settlements just to its north, and the town of Helensburgh and neighbouring coastal villages on the Firth of Clyde. Further west, the terrain was increasingly mountainous and sparsely populated (much lying beyond the Highland Boundary Fault). The middle of Loch Long was the western boundary and the middle of Loch Lomond the eastern boundary, excepting everything south of the Endrick Water which belonged wholly to Dumbarton. Much of the rest of the eastern border was with Stirling district in Central region, while the smaller Clydebank district was to the south-east. A boundary change in 1983 transferred the village of Croftamie from Dumbarton district to Stirling district.

Dumbarton district was abolished in 1996 under the Local Government etc. (Scotland) Act 1994 which replaced regions and districts with unitary council areas. In the lead-up to the reforms a referendum was held in which the more rural west of the district, including Helensburgh, voted to join Argyll and Bute rather than stay with Dumbarton. The part transferred to Argyll and Bute covered the area west of a line drawn from Cameron House at Loch Lomond to the Firth of Clyde just west of the Castlehill area of Dumbarton. The rest of Dumbarton district merged with neighbouring Clydebank district to become the West Dunbartonshire council area. The 1994 act originally named the new district "Dumbarton and Clydebank", but the shadow authority elected in 1995 requested a change of name to "West Dunbartonshire", which was agreed by the government before the new council area came into force.

== Political control ==
The first election to the district council was held in 1974, initially operating as a shadow authority alongside the outgoing authorities until it came into its powers on 16 May 1975. Political control of the council from 1975 was as follows:

Party in control	Years
Labour	1975–1977
No overall control	1977–1980
Labour	1980–1988
No overall control	1988–1996

=== Elections ===
Elections were held as follows:

Year	Seats	Labour	Conservative	SNP	Alliance	Independent / Other	Notes
1974	15	9	4	0	0	4	
1977	15	3	5	4	0	3	
1980	15	9	3	1	0	2	
1984	16	11	2	0	1	2	
1988	16	7	4	3	0	2	
1992	16	8	5	2	0	1	

== Premises ==
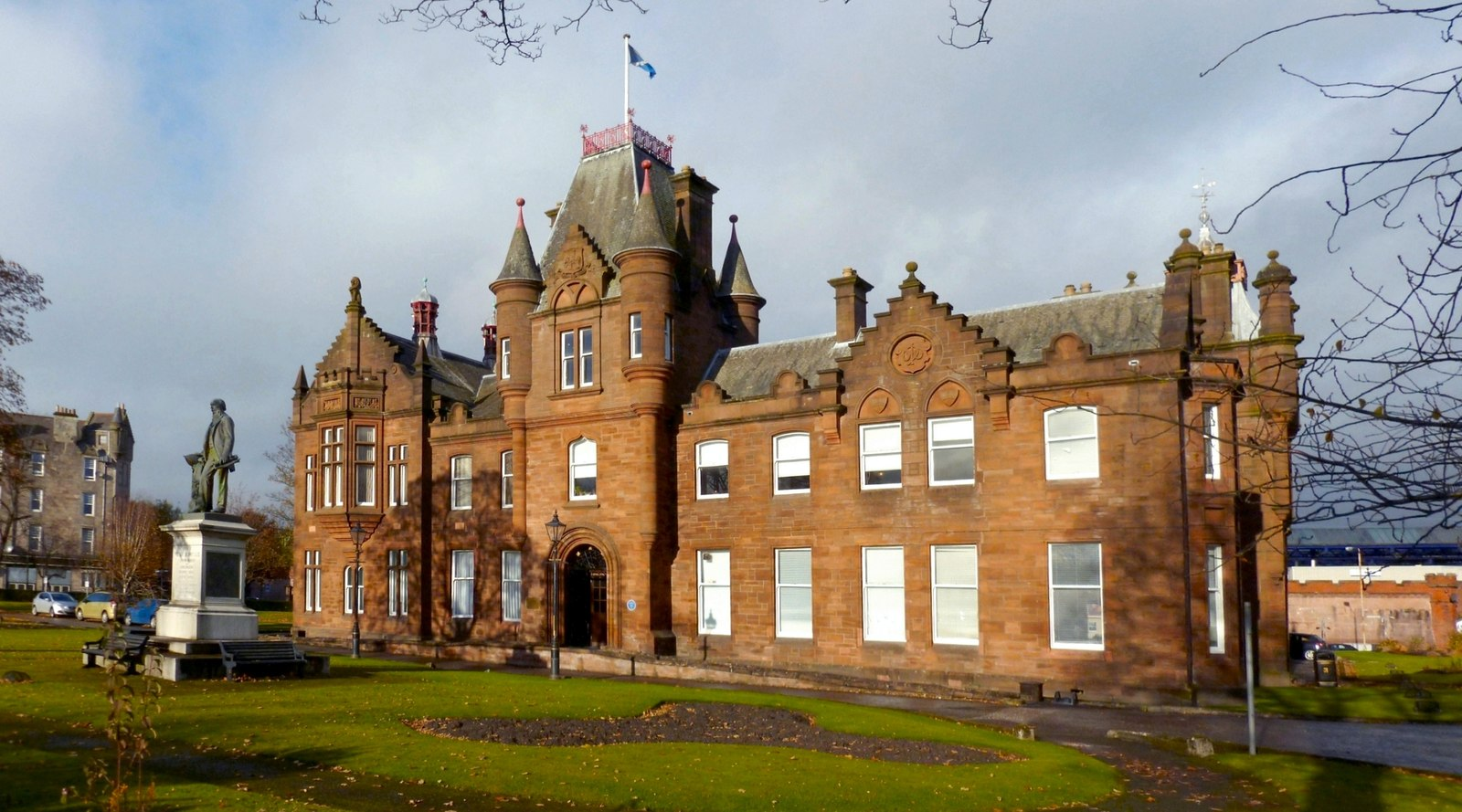
Municipal Buildings, Dumbarton

The council established its main offices at Crosslet House, a large Victorian house on Argyll Avenue in Dumbarton. The council also inherited the Municipal Buildings at the junction of Church Street and Glasgow Road in the centre of Dumbarton from the abolished Dumbarton Town Council. The Municipal Buildings had been built in 1903, and the district council used the council chamber there as its meeting place and other parts of the building as additional office space. Both buildings passed to the successor West Dunbartonshire Council in 1996. Crosslet House was subsequently demolished in 2015.

== See also ==
- Subdivisions of Scotland
