= 1974 Dumbarton District Council election =

Dumbarton District Council election

7 May 1974	1977 →

All 15 seats to Dumbarton District Council 8 seats needed for a majority
	First party	Second party	Third party
Party	Labour	Independent	Conservative
Seats won	9	4	2
Popular vote	12,215	6,417	9,680
Percentage	40.3%	21.2%	31.9%

Elections to Dumbarton District Council were held on 7 May 1974, on the same day as the other Scottish local government elections. This was the first election to the district council following the implementation of the Local Government (Scotland) Act 1973.

The election used the 15 wards created by the Formation Electoral Arrangements in 1974. Each ward elected one councillor using first-past-the-post voting.

Labour took control of the council after winning a majority. The party took nine of the 15 seats and more than 40% of the popular vote. Independent candidates won four seats and the Conservatives took two.

== Background ==
Prior to 1974, the area that was to become Dumbarton contained three of the eight burghs of the County of Dunbarton. The two small small burghs (Cove and Kilcreggan; and Helensburgh) had limited powers which included some control over planning as well as local taxation, building control, housing, lighting and drainage. The large burgh of Dumbarton had further powers over the police, public health, social services, registration of births, marriages and deaths and electoral registration. The rest of the local government responsibility fell to the county council which had full control over the areas which were not within a burgh.

Following the recommendations in the Wheatly Report, the old system of counties and burghs – which had resulted in a mishmash of local government areas in which some small burghs had larger populations but far fewer responsibilities than some large burghs and even counties – was to be replaced by a new system of regional and district councils. The Local Government (Scotland) Act 1973 implemented most of the recommendations in the Wheatly Report. The western part of the County of Dunbarton which included the three burghs was placed into the Dumbarton district within the Strathclyde region.

== Results ==
1974 Dumbarton District Council election result
Party	Seats	Gains	Losses	Net gain/loss	Seats %	Votes %	Votes	+/−
Labour	9			N/A	60.0	40.3	12,215	N/A
Independent	4			N/A	26.7	21.2	6,417	N/A
Conservative	2			N/A	13.3	31.9	9,680	N/A
SNP	0			N/A	0.0	4.0	1,198	N/A
Independent Labour	0			N/A	0.0	1.5	449	N/A
Communist	0			N/A	0.0	1.0	312	N/A
Residents	0			N/A	0.0	0.1	36	N/A

== Aftermath ==
Dumbarton was one of 11 districts in the newly created Strathclyde region that was won by Labour after the party took nine of the 15 seats. Independent candidates won four seats and the Conservatives took two. Labour also won control of the regional council which held its first election on the same day. Across Scotland, Labour won the most votes, the most seats and the most councils of any party.
