= Dumbarton Sheriff Court =

Courthouse in Dumbarton, Scotland

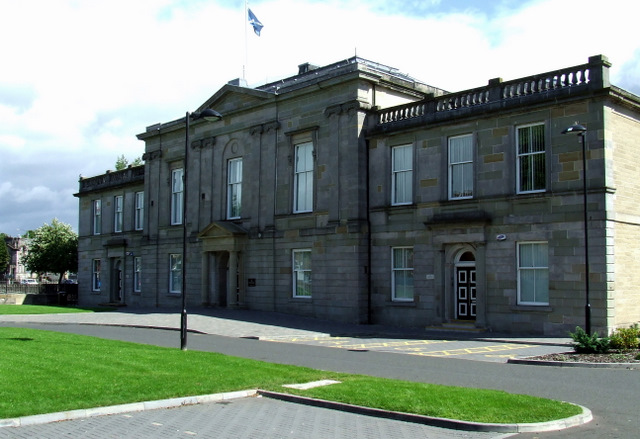
- Dumbarton Sheriff Court

- Shown in West Dunbartonshire
- 55.9444°N 4.5664°W
- Location: Church Street, Dumbarton

History
- Built: 1824

Site notes
- Architect: James Gillespie Graham
- Architectural style: Neoclassical style

Listed Building – Category B
- Official name: Dumbarton Sheriff Court and Justice of the Peace Court, including boundary wall and gatepiers and excluding 2-storey extension to east, Church Street, Dumbarton
- Designated: 3 March 1971
- Reference no.: LB24875

Dumbarton Sheriff Court is a judicial structure in Church Street, Dumbarton, West Dunbartonshire, Scotland. The complex, which was the headquarters of Dunbartonshire County Council and is currently used as a courthouse, is a Category B listed building.

== History ==
The first judicial building in Dumbarton was the old tolbooth on the north side of the High Street which was first mentioned in 1627 and re-built in around 1645. It initially had separate rooms for the burgh council and for the sheriff court but, in 1794, the council chamber was converted into a prison and the courtroom was subsequently shared. After the tollbooth became dilapidated, the sheriff decided to commission a new courthouse on the east side of Church Street.

The foundation stone for the new building was laid on 19 July 1824. It was designed by James Gillespie Graham in the neoclassical style, built in ashlar stone and was completed in 1826. The design involved a symmetrical main frontage of three bays facing onto Church Street. The central bay, which was slightly projected forward, featured a porch formed by Doric order columns supporting an entablature and a pediment; on the first floor, there was a sash window located within a slightly recessed round-headed panel. The outer bays were fenestrated by sash windows on both floors: those on the first floor were surmounted by cornices supported by brackets, and all three first-floor windows were flanked by pairs of Ionic order pilasters supporting an entablature, a cornice and a central pediment.

The building was extended with three-bays wings to the north and south to a design by William Spence in 1861. Following the implementation of the Local Government (Scotland) Act 1889, which established county councils in every county, the new county leaders needed to identify offices for Dunbartonshire County Council. The building was therefore further enlarged, in the late 19th century, to incorporate a council chamber for the new county council, as well as offices for the police, to a design by Duncan McNaughtan.

Dunbartonshire County Council moved to new County Buildings on Garshake Road in 1965, after which the Church Street building was used solely for judicial purposes: it continued to be used for hearings of the sheriff court and, on one day a month, for hearings of the justice of the peace court. The court was the venue, in 1984, for the trial of the Quaker, Helen Steven, who was accused of taking part in a nonviolent demonstration at the Faslane nuclear base: she refused to pay the fine and was imprisoned. An extensive programme of works to increase the capacity of the building was completed in February 2009. The works, which cost £7.5 million and increased the number of courtrooms for three to five, were carried out by Rok Construction to a design by Aedas.

== See also ==
- List of listed buildings in Dumbarton, West Dunbartonshire
