= List of Category A listed buildings in West Dunbartonshire =

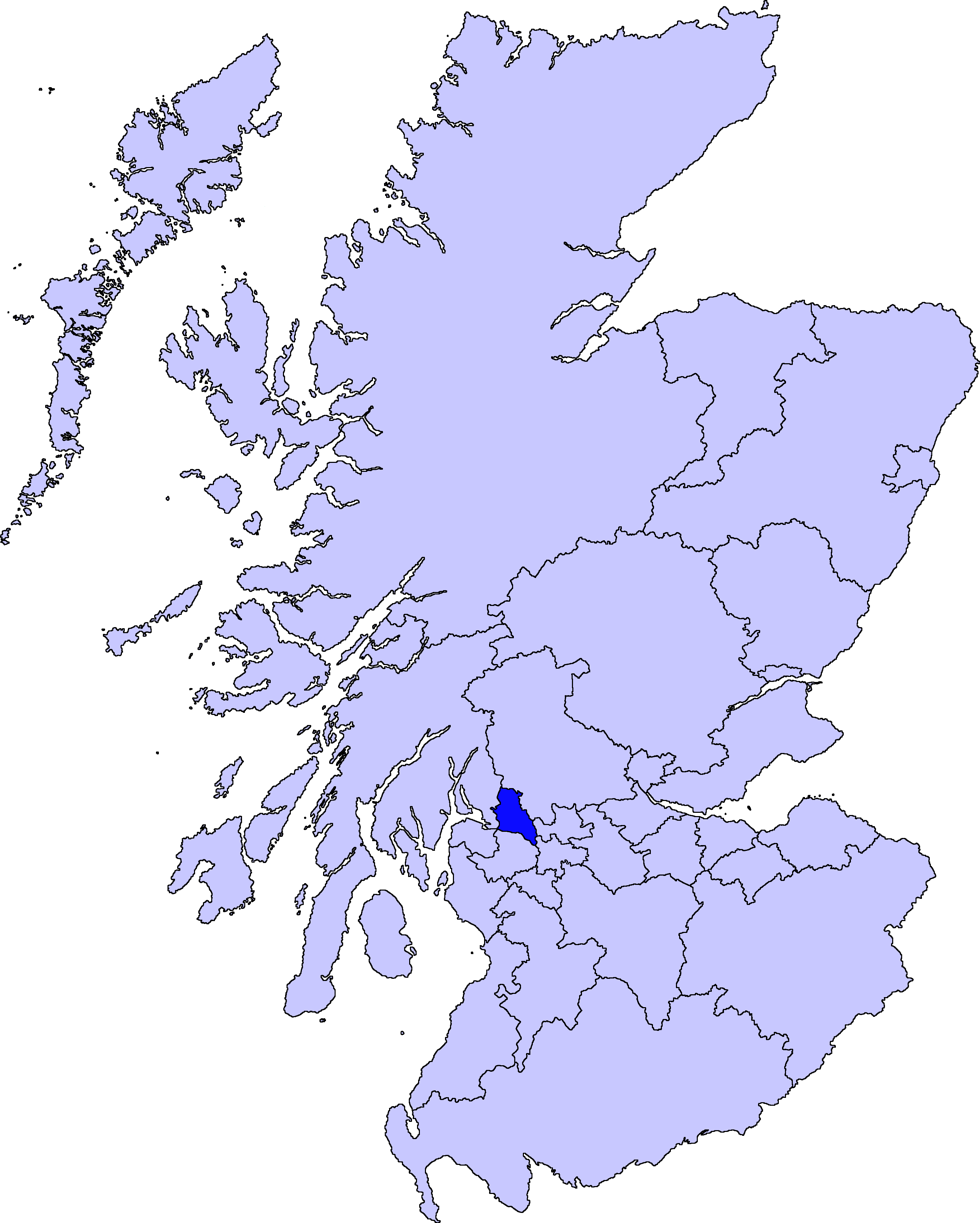
West Dunbartonshire shown within Scotland

This is a list of Category A listed buildings in the West Dunbartonshire council area in central Scotland.

In Scotland, the term listed building refers to a building or other structure officially designated as being of "special architectural or historic interest". Category A structures are those considered to be "buildings of national or international importance, either architectural or historic, or fine little-altered examples of some particular period, style or building type." Listing was begun by a provision in the Town and Country Planning (Scotland) Act 1947, and the current legislative basis for listing is the Planning (Listed Buildings and Conservation Areas) (Scotland) Act 1997. The authority for listing rests with Historic Scotland, an executive agency of the Scottish Government, which inherited this role from the Scottish Development Department in 1991. Once listed, severe restrictions are imposed on the modifications allowed to a building's structure or its fittings. Listed building consent must be obtained from local authorities prior to any alteration to such a structure. There are approximately 47,400 listed buildings in Scotland, of which around 8% (some 3,800) are Category A.

The council area of West Dunbartonshire covers 159 square kilometres (61 sq mi), and has a population of around 90,900. There are 20 Category A listed buildings in the area.

== Listed buildings ==
Name	Location	Date listed	Geo-coordinates	Notes	LB number	Image
Strathleven House	Vale of Leven		55°58′09″N 4°34′17″W		115	Upload another image See more images
Balloch Castle	Balloch		56°00′47″N 4°35′01″W		123	Upload another image See more images
Argyll Motor Works	Alexandria, North Main Street		55°59′31″N 4°35′02″W		127	Upload another image See more images
Dovecot, Strathleven House	Vale of Leven		55°58′11″N 4°34′13″W		823	Upload another image See more images
Woodbank House (Hamilton House Hotel)	Balloch, Luss Road		56°00′05″N 4°35′47″W		1125	Upload another image See more images
Alexandria Masonic Temple	Alexandria, Gilmour Street		55°59′13″N 4°35′07″W		1135	Upload another image
Smollett Monument	Renton, Main Street		55°58′11″N 4°35′04″W		1168	Upload another image See more images
Millburn Church	Renton, Main Street		55°58′34″N 4°35′06″W		1176	Upload another image See more images
Ross Priory	Gartocharn		56°03′17″N 4°32′51″W		7625	Upload another image See more images
Titan Cantilever Crane	Clydebank, former John Brown & Company shipyard		55°53′50″N 4°24′31″W		22993	Upload another image See more images
Ship Model Experiment Tank	Dumbarton, Castle Street		55°56′36″N 4°33′46″W		24873	Upload another image See more images
Former Dumbarton Academy	Dumbarton, Church Street		55°56′38″N 4°34′00″W		24874	Upload another image See more images
Dumbarton Central Station	Dumbarton, Station Road		55°56′48″N 4°34′03″W		24877	Upload another image See more images
Dumbarton Castle	Dumbarton		55°56′12″N 4°33′48″W		24880	Upload another image See more images
Dumbarton Riverside Parish Church	Dumbarton, High Street		55°56′35″N 4°34′02″W		24885	Upload another image See more images
St Augustine's Episcopal Church	Dumbarton, High Street		55°56′37″N 4°34′07″W		24890	Upload another image See more images
Overtoun House	Milton		55°57′08″N 4°31′29″W		24907	Upload another image See more images
Levenford House	Dumbarton, Helenslee Road		55°56′41″N 4°34′45″W		24916	Upload another image
Dalmoak House	Renton		55°57′34″N 4°35′27″W		45600	Upload another image See more images
Drumkinnon Bay, Winch House and Slipway	Balloch Pier, Loch Lomond		56°00′28″N 4°35′27″W		46721	Upload another image See more images

== See also ==
- Scheduled monuments in West Dunbartonshire
