= Dumbarton Burgh Hall =

Municipal Building in Dumbarton, Scotland

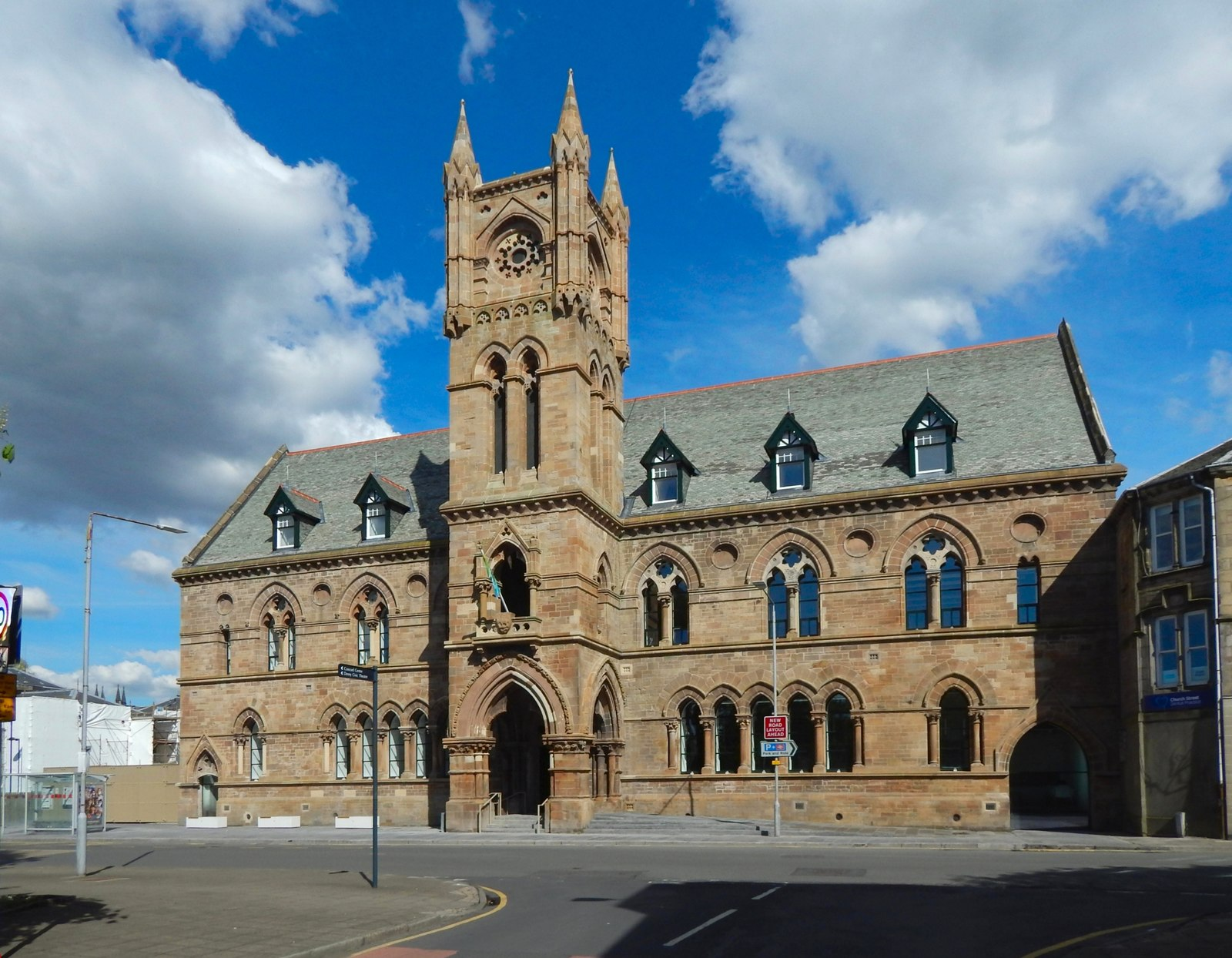
- Dumbarton Burgh Hall

- Shown in West Dunbartonshire
- 55.9438°N 4.5669°W
- Location: Church Street, Dumbarton

History
- Built: 1866

Site notes
- Architect(s): Robert Grieve Melvin and William Leiper
- Architectural style: Gothic Revival style

Listed Building – Category A
- Official name: Burgh Hall, Church Street, Dumbarton
- Designated: 13 November 1981
- Reference no.: LB24874

Dumbarton Burgh Hall is a municipal structure in Church Street, Dumbarton, West Dunbartonshire, Scotland. The building, which is the headquarters of West Dunbartonshire Council and the former location of Dumbarton Academy, is Category A listed.

== History ==
The first municipal building in Dumbarton was the old tolbooth on the north side of the High Street which was first mentioned in 1627 and re-built in around 1645. It initially had separate rooms for the burgh council and for the sheriff court but, in 1794, the council chamber was converted into a prison and the courtroom was subsequently shared. After the tollbooth became dilapidated, the burgh council and the sheriff court relocated to a new courthouse designed by James Gillespie Graham in the neoclassical style on the east side of Church Street in 1826. The tollbooth was then demolished in 1832.

By the mid-19th century Dumbarton Academy had outgrown the building which it had occupied on the west side of Church Street since 1789. In this context burgh leaders decided to procure a combined burgh hall and academy: the site they chose, on the east side of Church Street to the south of the courthouse, was occupied by a building known as College House.

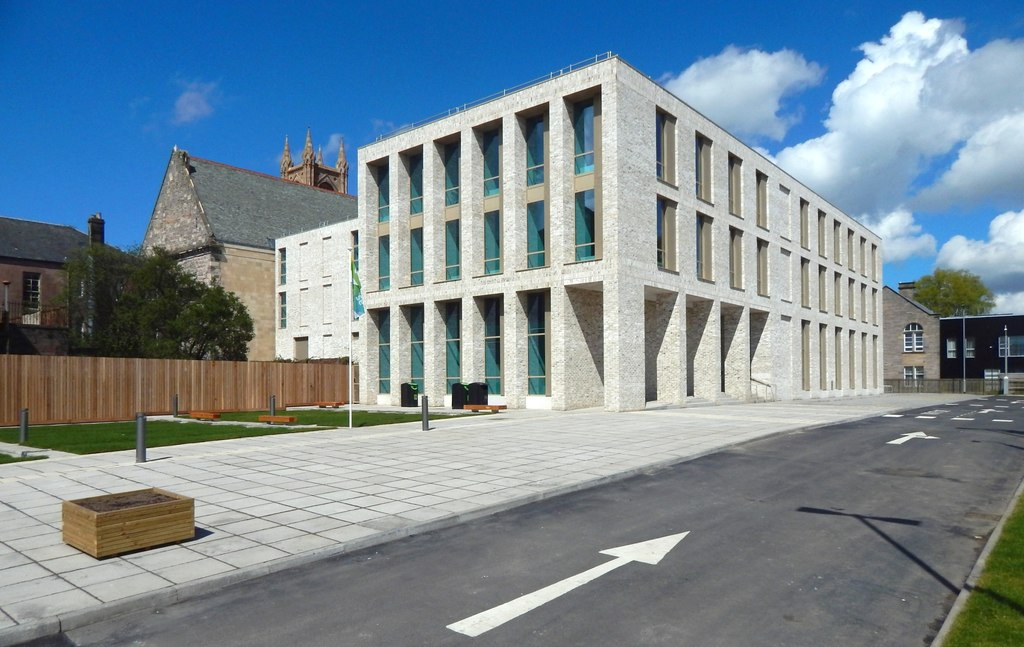
The new offices at the rear of the Burgh Hall

The foundation stone for the new building was laid on 23 June 1865. It was designed by Robert Grieve Melvin and William Leiper in the Gothic Revival style, built in ashlar stone and completed in two stages: the burgh hall in January 1866 and the academy in August 1866. The design involved a symmetrical main frontage with nine bays facing onto Church Street; the central bay, which projected forward, featured a four-stage tower with an arched doorway on the ground floor, an arched opening with a canopy on the first floor, a pair of lancet windows on the second floor and a rose window in the final stage. The tower, which was decorated with octagonal turrets at each corner in the final stage, was flanked by sections which contained five-light mullioned windows on the ground floor, two-light traceried windows on the first floor and dormer windows on the second floor. Internally, the rooms on the ground floor on either side of the tower was used for academic purposes; a corridor emanating from the tower led to a large public hall at the rear of the building and there was a smaller public hall on the first floor at the front of the building.

The building was damaged by a fire on 11 December 1882 but was fully restored the following year. The burgh council relocated to the Municipal Buildings in Glasgow Road in 1903, and the academy relocated to a site formerly occupied by Braehead House in Townend Road in August 1914. The primary department briefly moved back into the building in 1921 but moved out to Townend Road in 1937. The whole building then became a dedicated events venue: concert performers included the contralto singer, Kathleen Ferrier, who made an appearance on 3 April 1945.

After being badly damaged in a fire in 1976, the burgh hall was briefly used as the education offices of the South of Scotland Electricity Board before it then fell vacant and began deteriorating. In the early 1990s, the council proposed complete demolition of the building but the proposal was rejected by the Secretary of State for Scotland in March 1994. A programme of stabilisation works, which involved the demolition of most of the structure behind the façade, was completed in 2008.

After funding was secured from various public bodies including Historic Environment Scotland in October 2015, Lendlease commenced a programme of restoration works to a scheme by Keppie Design. The scheme, which cost £15.7 million, involved the construction of a new structure behind the façade for use as the main offices of West Dunbartonshire Council. The council moved from its old offices at Garshake Road into the newly restored building in July 2018.

== See also ==
- List of Category A listed buildings in West Dunbartonshire
- List of listed buildings in Dumbarton, West Dunbartonshire
