= Island I Vow =

Island in Scotland

Coordinates: 56°16′40″N 4°41′50″W

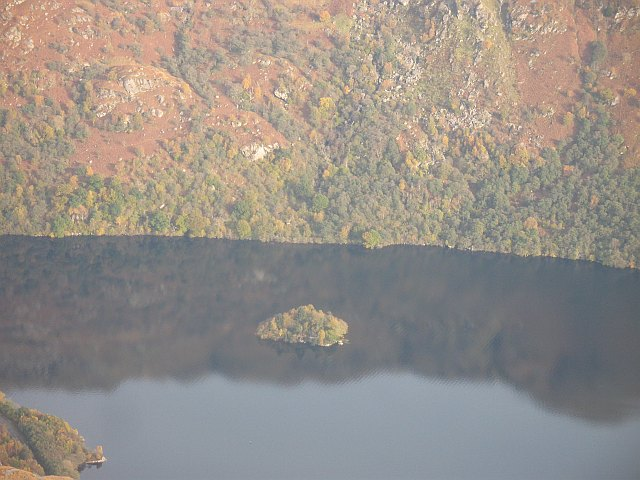

Island I Vow is a wooded islet near the head of Loch Lomond in west-central Scotland. It is 10 m tall at its highest point, and 80 m long. The island contains the remains of a castle built by the chief of Clan MacFarlane in 1577. This became the chief's primary residence after the destruction of Inveruglas Castle further down the loch, but it fell into ruin after the chief moved to the mainland.

The island's name appears as Elan(a)vow in older sources and seemingly means "island of the booth or store", from the Gaelic eilean a' bhùtha. Alternatively, the second element may be bhodha, meaning "sunken rock".

== Archaeology and preservation ==
Island I Vow is protected as a scheduled monument by the Scottish Government under the Ancient Monuments and Archaeological Areas Act 1979. The castle is of national importance for its historical associations with the MacFarlane chiefs and for the potential of its above and below ground archaeology as a representative example of medieval island strongholds. The castle was still inhabited in 1724 but was in ruins by 1814. The east and south walls of the castle are in a reasonable state of preservation, but the north wall is mostly collapsed above ground and first floor level. An assessment of the condition of the site in 2012 during low loch levels revealed the presence of a perimeter wall around the entire island.

The Elanvow Preservation Fund has been set up to support archaeological study and preservation of this historic site.
