= County Buildings, Dumbarton =

Former county hall in Dumbarton, Scotland

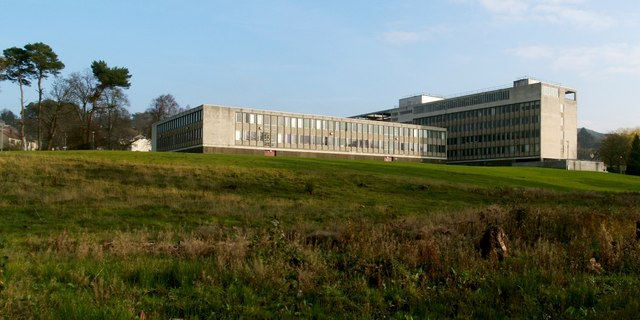
- Former County Buildings at Dumbarton

- Shown in West Dunbartonshire
- 55.9487°N 4.5462°W
- Location: Garshake Road, Dumbarton

History
- Built: 1965

Site notes
- Architect(s): Lane Bremner & Garnett
- Architectural style: Brutalist style

County Buildings was a municipal structure in Garshake Road, Dumbarton, West Dunbartonshire, Scotland. The complex was the headquarters of Dunbartonshire County Council and was subsequently used as council offices for West Dunbartonshire Council.

== History ==
The original county offices in Dumbarton were in the Sheriff Courthouse in Church Street. In the early 1960s, the council leaders decided that Dunbartonshire County Council needed larger offices and they selected a site to the southeast of Garshake Road in what was once part of the Crosslet Estate.

The foundation stone for the new building was laid by the council convener, Hugh Gillies, on 26 June 1963. It was designed by John Armstrong Lane, Duncan Bremner, and Alan Bristow of the firm of Lane Bremner & Garnett in the Brutalist style, built in concrete and glass at a cost of £800,000 and was officially opened by Queen Elizabeth II, who was accompanied by the Duke of Edinburgh, on 28 June 1965. The design involved a five-storey long and narrow main frontage facing onto Garshake Road. In front of the main building there was a large two-story structure and, behind the main frontage, there was a smaller single-story square building which accommodated the council chamber. A statue sculpted by James Barclay depicting a mother and child was installed outside the main entrance.

After the abolition of Dunbartonshire County Council in 1975, ownership of the main building passed to Strathclyde Regional Council and, following the introduction of unitary authorities in 1995, ownership passed to West Dunbartonshire Council. In the early 21st century, the council, finding County Buildings "out of date", "crumbling" and "in the wrong location", decided to commission new offices which were to be erected behind the façade of Dumbarton Burgh Hall.

After the staff moved into the new offices in July 2018, the structure on Garshake Road was demolished in summer 2019. The site was marketed for sale in September 2018 and, in November 2019, Miller Homes acquired the site for around £6 million and subsequently secured planning consent to build 86 houses there. The new development was named Garshake Gardens.
