= Municipal Buildings, Dumbarton =

Municipal building in Dumbarton, Scotland

Dumbarton Municipal Buildings
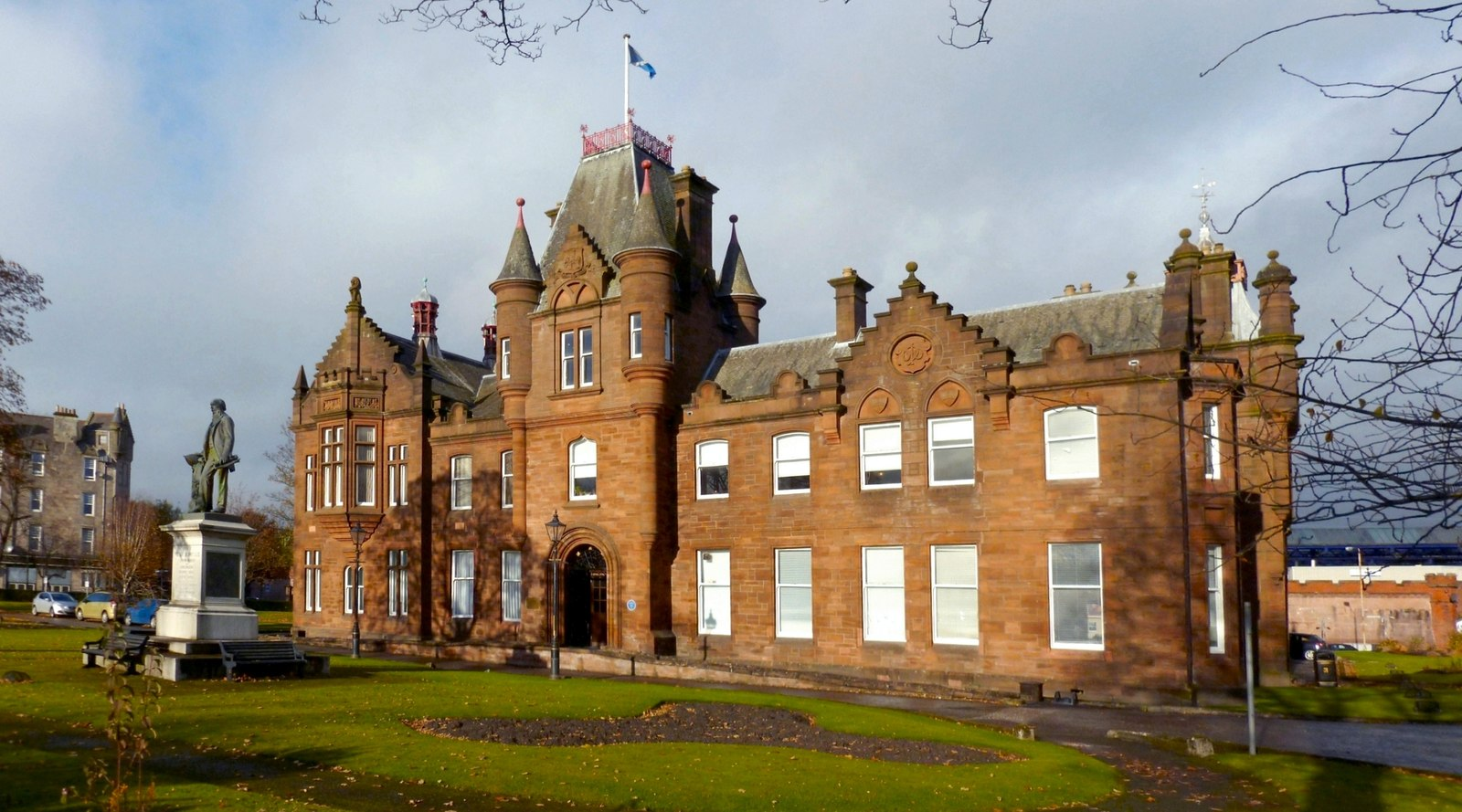
- Dumbarton Municipal Buildings

- Shown in West Dunbartonshire
- 55.9459°N 4.5675°W
- Location: Glasgow Road, Dumbarton

History
- Built: 1903

Site notes
- Architect: James Thomson
- Architectural style: Scottish baronial style

Listed Building – Category B
- Official name: Glasgow Road Municipal Buildings and Gatepiers
- Designated: 31 January 1984
- Reference no.: LB24881

Dumbarton Municipal Buildings is a structure in Glasgow Road, Dumbarton, West Dunbartonshire, Scotland. The structure, which is used as a venue for weddings and civil partnership ceremonies, is a Category B listed building.

== History ==
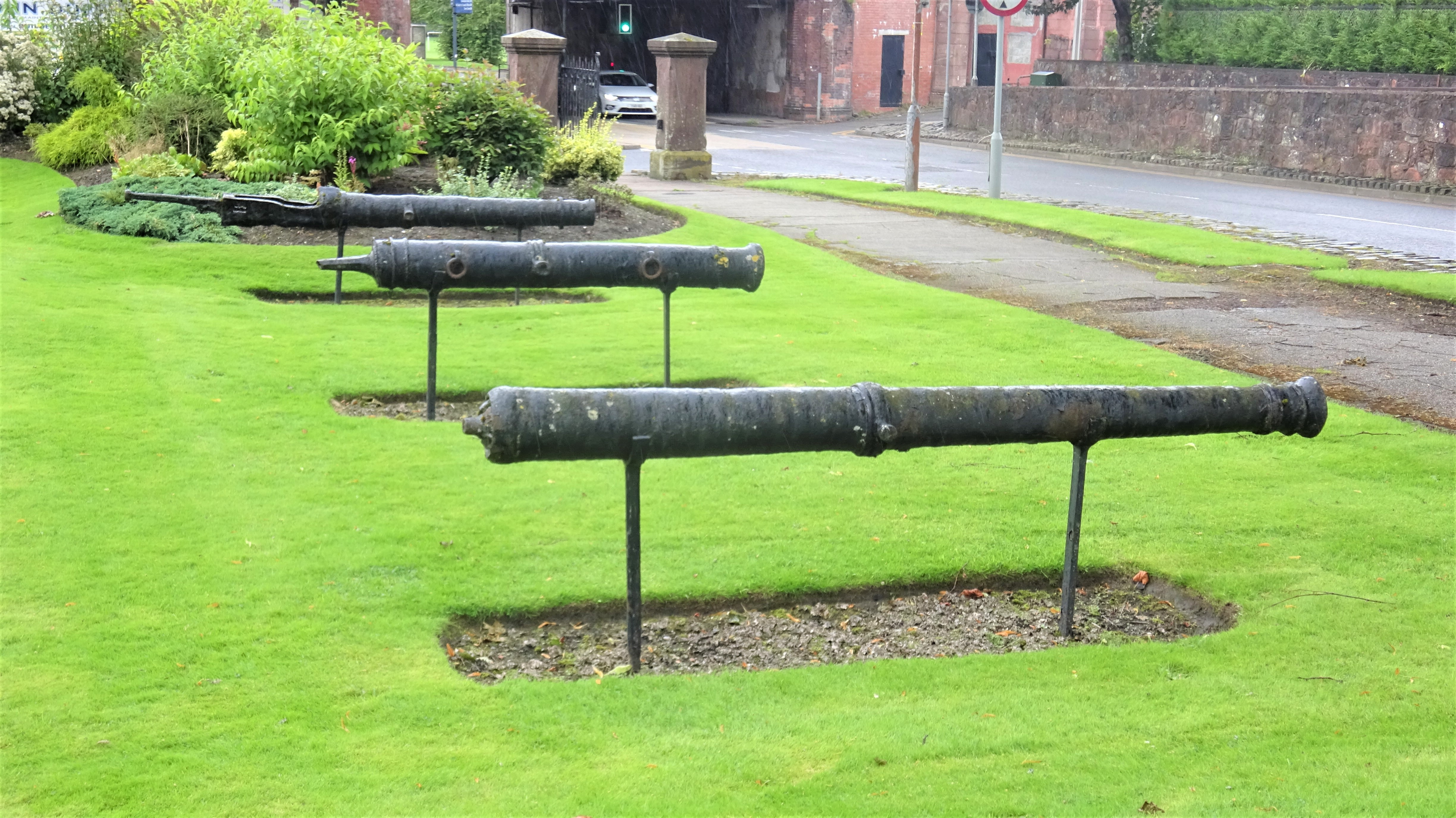
The three cannon

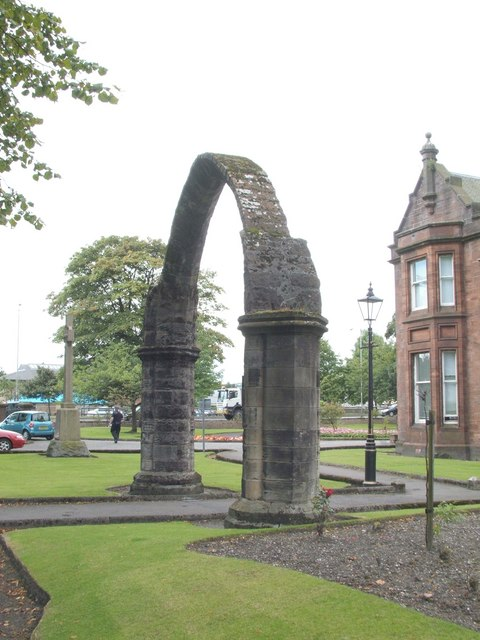
The Second Boer War Memorial (left, background) and the pointed arch from the Collegiate Church of St Mary (right, foreground)

For much of the latter half of the 19th century the burgh council was based in Dumbarton Burgh Hall. However, they shared the building with Dumbarton Academy and, in the late 19th century, burgh leaders decided to commission a bespoke building. The site they selected on the north side of Glasgow Road was occupied by College Park House, the headquarters of the shipbuilders, Archibald McMillan & Son; the house was demolished and the land was presented to the burgh council by the chemical manufacturer, John White, 1st Baron Overtoun. Construction of the new building started in 1899. It was designed by James Thomson of Baird & Thomson in Glasgow in the Scottish baronial style, built in red sandstone and was completed in 1903.

The design involved an asymmetrical main frontage with eleven bays facing onto Glasgow Road; the central bay, which slightly projected forward, contained a three-stage tower. The tower featured a round headed doorway with a moulded architrave in the first stage, an ogival-shaped window in the second stage and a pair of mullioned windows surmounted by the burgh coat of arms and flanked by corner bartizans in the third stage. There was a pyramid-shaped roof to the tower. The first three bays on the left formed a section which was also slightly projected forward and contained an oriel window in the central bay and a stepped gable with finials above. The connecting section of two bays to the left of the tower and the whole of the section to the right of the tower were fenestrated by casement windows on both floors. The second and third bays from the right were surmounted by a stepped gable. Internally, the principal room was the council chamber which featured leaded windows depicting science, engineering, truth, justice, fortitude, and faith. A stained glass window was installed on the staircase to commemorate the Coronation of Edward VII and Alexandra.

A statue of the shipbuilder and shipowner, Peter Denny, sculpted by Sir Hamo Thornycroft, was erected in front of the building in 1902. Various other monuments were placed to the east of the building: three cannon, which had been captured during the Third Anglo-Burmese War, were placed there at the time of its opening. A pointed arch from the Collegiate Church of St Mary, which had been founded by Isabella, Countess of Lennox in 1454 and demolished to make was for Dumbarton Central railway station in the mid-19th century, was placed just to the south of the three cannon. A war memorial, in the form of a Celtic cross designed by the sculptor John Gilfillan, which was intended to commemorate the lives of local service personnel who had died in the Second Boer War, was erected just to the south of the arch and unveiled by the Lord Lieutenant of Dunbartonshire, Sir James Colquhoun, 5th Baronet, on 9 October 1904.

The building continued to serve as the headquarters of Dumbarton Town Council until the burgh's abolition in 1975. The larger replacement Dumbarton District Council established its main offices at Crosslet House on Argyll Avenue, but continued to use the Municipal Buildings as additional office space and held its meetings in the council chamber there.

The building passed to West Dunbartonshire Council when local government was reorganised again in 1996. An extensive programme of refurbishment works, which included roof repairs and restoration of the council chamber, was completed at a cost of £1.4 million in 2018. The works enabled the council to provide modern office accommodation for their staff including those in the registrar's department and also to provide appropriate surroundings for weddings and civil partnership ceremonies.

== See also ==
- List of listed buildings in Dumbarton, West Dunbartonshire
