= Dalmoak House =

- Parish of Cardross, Dunbartonshire, Scotland, United Kingdom

Site information
- Open to the public: By appointment

Location
- Shown within Scotland
- Location within Scotland
- Coordinates: 55.9593°N 4.5909°W
- Grid reference: grid reference NS3835677071

Site history
- Built: 1866
- Built for: John Aiken of Glasgow

Listed Building – Category A
- Designated: 8 September 1980
- Reference no.: LB45600
- Architect: Alexander Watt
- Materials: Stone, Marble

Dalmoak House, is a Category A listed building in the ancient Parish of Cardross, between the village of Renton and the town of Dumbarton, on the north side the Firth of Clyde in Dunbartonshire, Scotland. Built in 1866–69 in the Scottish baronial style by the architect Alexander Watt, it was commissioned by the Glasgow wine and spirits merchant John Aiken. Aiken's trade gave rise to the house's enduring nickname, 'Brandy Castle'.

== Early history ==
Some sources indicated that the land was actually owned by Robert the Bruce at one time. The oldest document as to ownership is from 18 October 1533, a charter granting the property to John Palmer. The charter in 1569, after the Palmer family gave up ownership, granted the property to "John Sempill/Semple of Fulwood".

The current house was built on the foundations of an earlier building, the blocked up windows of which can be seen in one of the wine cellars. Dalmoak was one of the royal manors in the district, and was used chiefly as a hunting seat. The Dalmoak Estate included the remains of the Manor of Cardross where Robert the Bruce died.

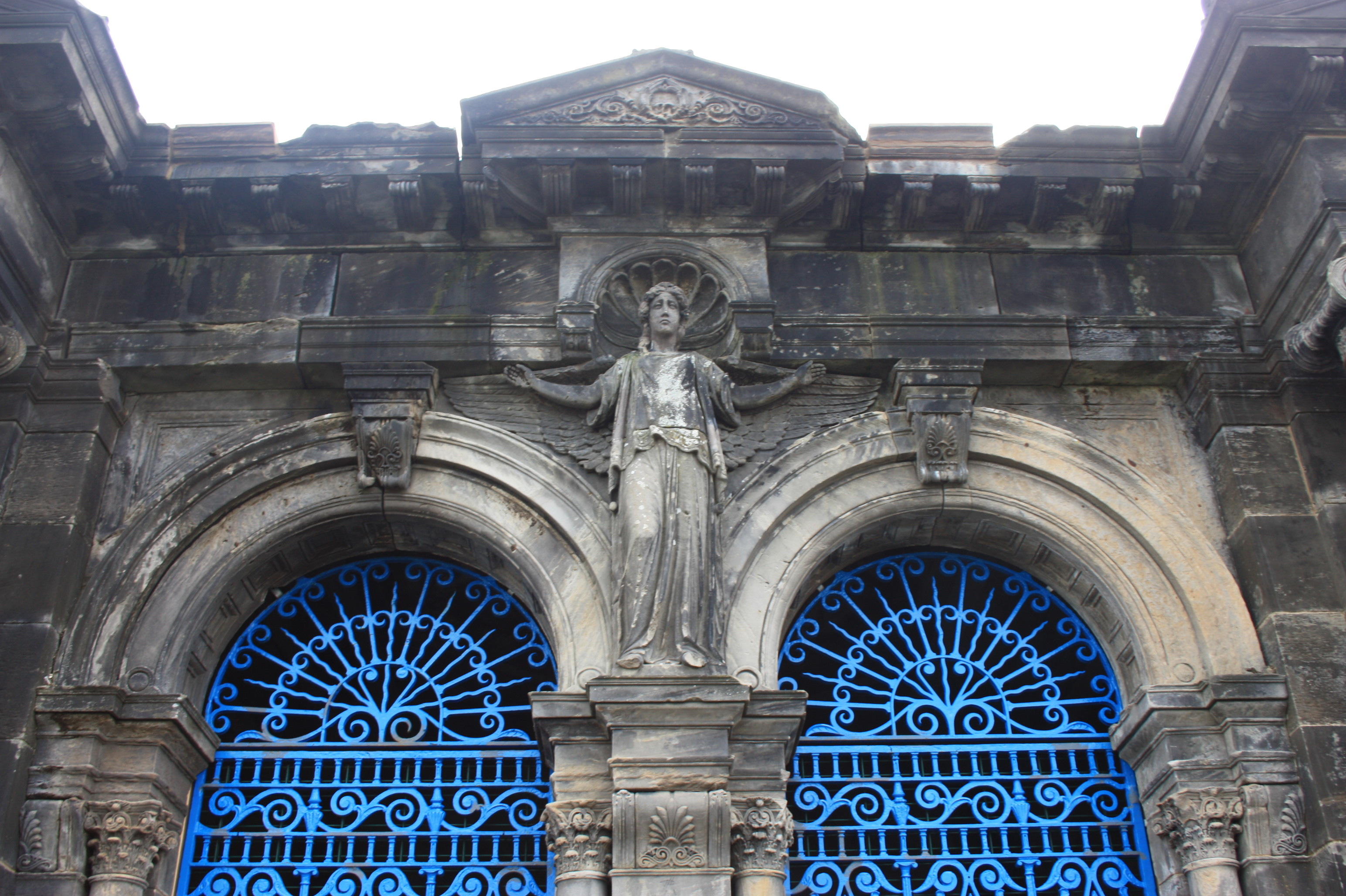
Aiken Mausoleum (detail)

John Aiken, the house's original owner, is buried in the Aiken Mausoleum on the north slopes of the Glasgow Necropolis.

== 20th Century ==
Before WW II, the Aiken Trust had leased the property to a local farmer, Robert Young (circa 1934) who operated it as Dalmoak Farm. (Some reports erroneously state that Young purchased the property.)

For a time during the Second World War, the RAF used the house as an operational headquarters. Later, it was sold to Alexandrina Reid Cousins who started the restoration. Her grandson, John Szwed, completed the restoration; the home was then converted into a nursing home. The full ownership record from 1801 to 2007 is stated as follows:

Descent: John Aiken (1801–75); to son, James Aiken (1843–1928); to Trustees, one of whom (James Cyril Mawdesley Aiken), lived in the house; leased from c.1934 to Mr Young, farmer of Dalmoak Farm; used by RAF during War as the headquarters of the Clydebank decoy system, then as flats for homeless families; then as cattle stalling until sold 1964 to Alexandrina Reid Cousins (died 1996); gifted to daughter, Constance Szwed-Cousins; gifted to son, John Szwed (died 2004), who restored it as a nursing home; to brother, Michel Szwed-Cousins, who sold 2007 to Castle Glen Care & Nursing Home.

Dalmoak House was A listed on 8 September 1980, #LB45600. The stables, lodge, walled garden and gatepiers are B listed, separately from the house: #LB42921 and LB1163. The Historic Environment Scotland web site provides a detailed summary of the House as it stood in 1980. The following is an excerpt:

2-storey, 5-bay, broad U-plan castellated Tudor gothic mansion. Battered base course with gunloop details; hoodmoulds; crenellated parapet on billetted corbelling; chamfered reveals; curved corners; corbelled bartizans; rope moulding. ... Interior: sumptuous decorative schemes - tripartite etched glass vestibule door; stair hall and corridor, scagliola Corinthian columns; coffered ceiling, modillioned cornice; heavy decorative cornice, paired brackets. Wooden Imperial stair; 3 round-arched stained glass stair windows depicting Celtic mythological scene, ?JA? monogram, unsigned; niches to right and left of stair landing. Ornate marble chimneypieces in upper bedrooms. Room to W off hall; coffered, heavy decorative plasterwork; Corinthian columns with ?JA? monogram; geometric ceiling. East front room, plasterwork ceiling, egg and dart moulding, beading, dentil cornice.

== 21st Century ==
The house was offered for sale from 2017 to 2019, with an asking price which fell from £1.7 million to £675,000, over concerns at the cost of the land taxes involved.

Castle Glen Care And Nursing Home, owned by Nanda and Nitin Satpute closed due to financial difficulties in late 2013. Nitin Satpute's plan was to convert the house into a hotel and a venue for events. He ran into difficulties when trying to get planning permission. A November 2019 Country Life (magazine) report provided additional specifics about the property. While the house was built in 1866, a home of some type has been located here since medieval times. The 9,500 square feet (880 m^{2}) home includes 14 bedrooms, a formal dining room and a basement with a wine cellar.

The stable building has been renovated and is now used as cottages.

== Gallery ==
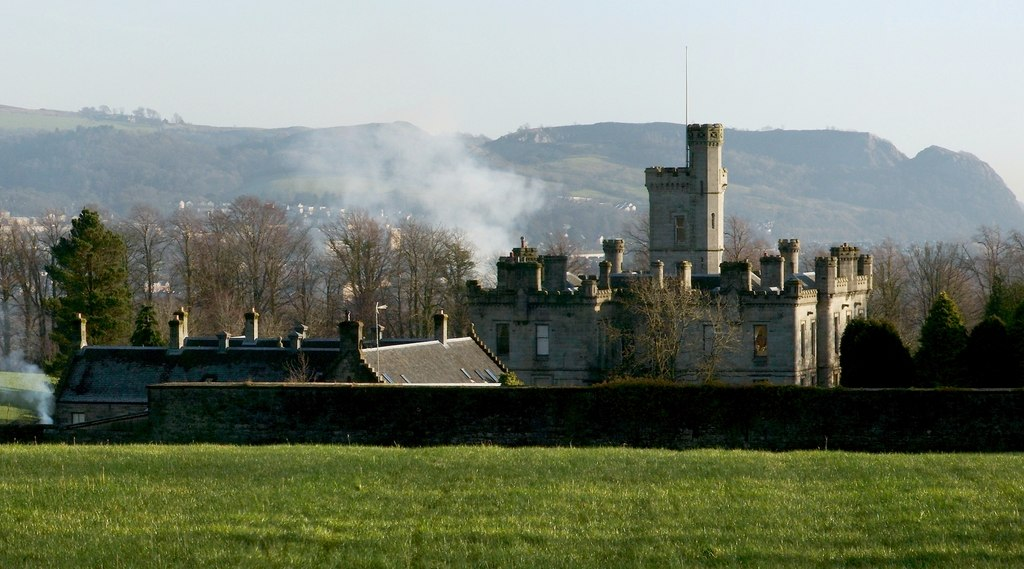
Rear view of Dalmoak
