= List of listed buildings in Kilmaronock, West Dunbartonshire =

This is a list of listed buildings in the parish of Kilmaronock in West Dunbartonshire, Scotland.

== List ==
Name	Location	Date listed	Geo-coordinates	Notes	Category	LB number	Image
Auchenlarich With Stables And Gatepiers			56°01′15″N 4°30′35″W		B	43911	Upload Photo
Tullochan Farmhouse With Outbuildings			56°02′24″N 4°32′39″W		B	43924	Upload Photo
Ross Priory, Lodge With Gatepiers			56°03′01″N 4°32′09″W		B	7626	Upload Photo
Gartocharn, Chimes Cottage Including Ancillary Structures And Boundary Wall			56°02′27″N 4°31′44″W		C(S)	46543	Upload Photo
Kilmaronock Parish Church With Graveyard, Boundary Wall And Gatepiers			56°03′18″N 4°29′13″W		B	7621	Upload Photo
Ashfield House With Walled Gardens, Boundary Wall And Gatepiers			56°01′22″N 4°33′35″W		B	7631	Upload Photo
Buchanan Estate, South Avenue, Gates, Gatepiers And Boundary Walls			56°03′15″N 4°29′44″W		B	43914	Upload Photo
Caldarvan House			56°01′51″N 4°30′59″W		C(S)	43916	Upload Photo
Kilmaronock House			56°03′27″N 4°28′59″W		B	43921	Upload Photo
Ross Priory, Stables With Pigsty And Former Bothy			56°03′23″N 4°32′45″W		C(S)	13662	Upload Photo
Kilmaronock Manse With Outbuildings			56°03′19″N 4°29′16″W		C(S)	7622	Upload Photo
Boturich Castle With Quadrant Wall And Gatepiers			56°01′36″N 4°35′20″W		B	7627	Upload another image See more images
Buchanan Estate, South Avenue Bridge			56°03′50″N 4°29′39″W		B	43912	Upload Photo
Buchanan Estate, Woodend Lodge			56°03′48″N 4°29′41″W		C(S)	43915	Upload Photo
Gartocharn Parish Church (Church of Scotland) With Boundary Wall And Gatepiers			56°02′39″N 4°31′29″W		B	43920	Upload Photo
Old Military Road, War Memorial With Boundary Wall			56°02′55″N 4°30′42″W		C(S)	43922	Upload Photo
Kilmaronock Castle			56°03′26″N 4°28′58″W		B	7623	Upload Photo
Ross Priory			56°03′17″N 4°32′51″W		A	7625	Upload another image
Gartocharn, Former United Free Church Manse With Boundary Wall, Gatepiers And Gates			56°02′31″N 4°31′40″W		C(S)	43919	Upload Photo
Buchanan Estate, South Avenue, Gargowan Lodge			56°03′15″N 4°29′44″W		C(S)	43913	Upload Photo
Duncryne House			56°02′20″N 4°31′05″W		C(S)	43917	Upload Photo
Ross Priory, Buchanan Burial Ground With Memorial And Gatepiers			56°03′12″N 4°32′25″W		B	43923	Upload Photo
Inchmurrin, Lennox Castle			56°02′31″N 4°36′48″W		B	7624	Upload Photo

== Key ==
The scheme for classifying buildings in Scotland is:

- Category A: "buildings of national or international importance, either architectural or historic; or fine, little-altered examples of some particular period, style or building type."
- Category B: "buildings of regional or more than local importance; or major examples of some particular period, style or building type, which may have been altered."
- Category C: "buildings of local importance; lesser examples of any period, style, or building type, as originally constructed or moderately altered; and simple traditional buildings which group well with other listed buildings."

In March 2016 there were 47,288 listed buildings in Scotland. Of these, 8% were Category A, and 50% were Category B, with the remaining 42% being Category C.
