= Cameron House =

Hotel near Balloch, Scotland

Coordinates: 56°00′48″N 4°36′26″W

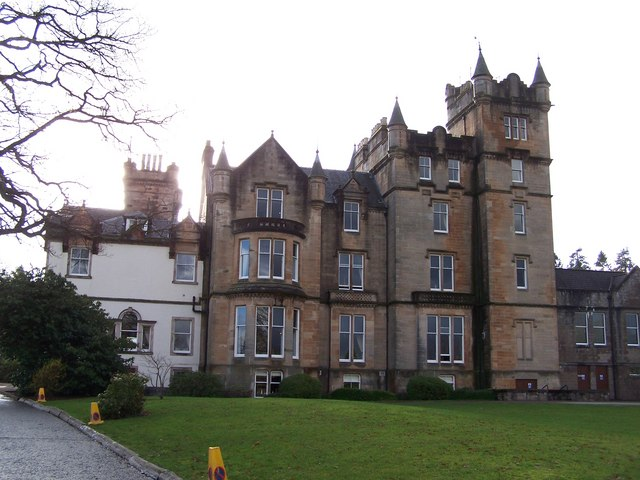
Cameron House Hotel - 2009

Cameron House, located on Loch Lomond near Balloch, Scotland, was first built in the mid-1700s, and later purchased by Sir James Smollett. The modern Baronial stone castle was built by William Spence in 1830 (rebuilt after a fire in 1865), with peaked gables and decorative turrets.

The House is a Category B listed building.

For three centuries, the land was part of the Smollett estate, now reduced to 44 hectares of wooded land that juts into the loch. Over the centuries the Smollets hosted James Boswell and Samuel Johnson, the Empress Eugenie of France, Princess Margaret and Lord Louis Mountbatten, and Winston Churchill.

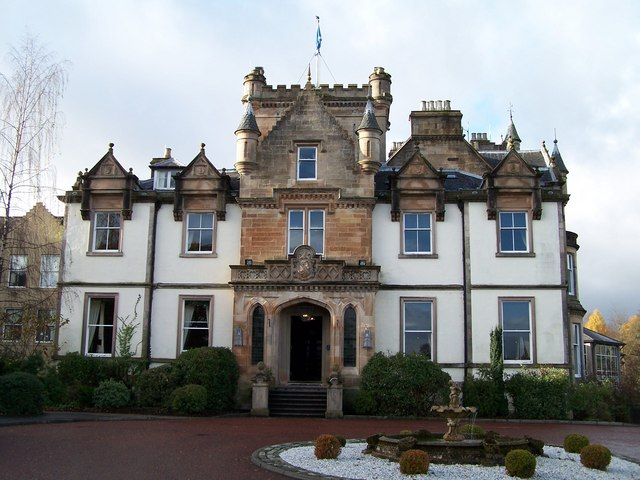
Cameron House - 2009

In 1985 Laird Patrick Telfer Smollett sold the House and land to Kildonnan Investments who had already developed Craigendarroch in Ballater. Subsequently acquired by Canon Street Investments, which may have sold it to De Vere.

De Vere sold the hotel in November 2014 to Sankaty Advisors and Canyon Capital Advisors, the owners of QHotels. Shortly afterwards in 2015 Cameron House was sold again, this time to KSL Capital Partners, an American firm.

Today it operates within the Cameron House resort, which comprises 44 hectares of land around the hotel and The Cameron Club (formerly the Carrick Estate), situated 2 miles north of the hotel, and has two golf courses and an award-winning spa. The resort also has 115 self-catering properties operating under the Cameron Lodges brand.

In October 2025, KSL Capital Partners put the resort up for sale with an expected price of £100 million.

== 2017 hotel fire ==
A fire at the hotel on 18 December 2017 killed two people and injured three.

The hotel caught fire at around 06:41. The fire burned for over 24 hours with over 14 fire engines being dispatched to help extinguish the fire. Locally, rumours began the Christmas tree in the foyer caught fire, however a court investigation at Dumbarton Sheriff Court in January 2021 found that a hotel porter had put a bag of hot ash and embers into a cupboard containing kindling and newspaper.

Over 200 people were evacuated from the hotel. Two people died in the fire, later named as couple Simon Midgley and Richard Dyson from London. Three other people had injuries from the fire. The hotel embarked on a "Careful and sensitive restoration project which will see Cameron House Hotel, The Leisure Club, The Great Scots Bar and Cameron Grill remain closed until autumn 2019." Subsequently, their website announced that restoration were works intended to have the hotel reopen in early 2020.

The company which owns the hotel admitted breaching the Health and Safety at Work etc. Act 1974 and was fined £500,000; the fine was reduced from £750,000 due to the guilty plea. The hotel was found to not have proper procedures in place for the disposal of ash, or for staff training.

On 3 June 2021 STV News reported that the hotel had begun accepting new bookings; the owners stated that the hotel would reopen on 1 August 2021.
