= Inveruglas Isle =

Island in Loch Lomond in Scotland

Coordinates: 56.24893°N 4.708886°W

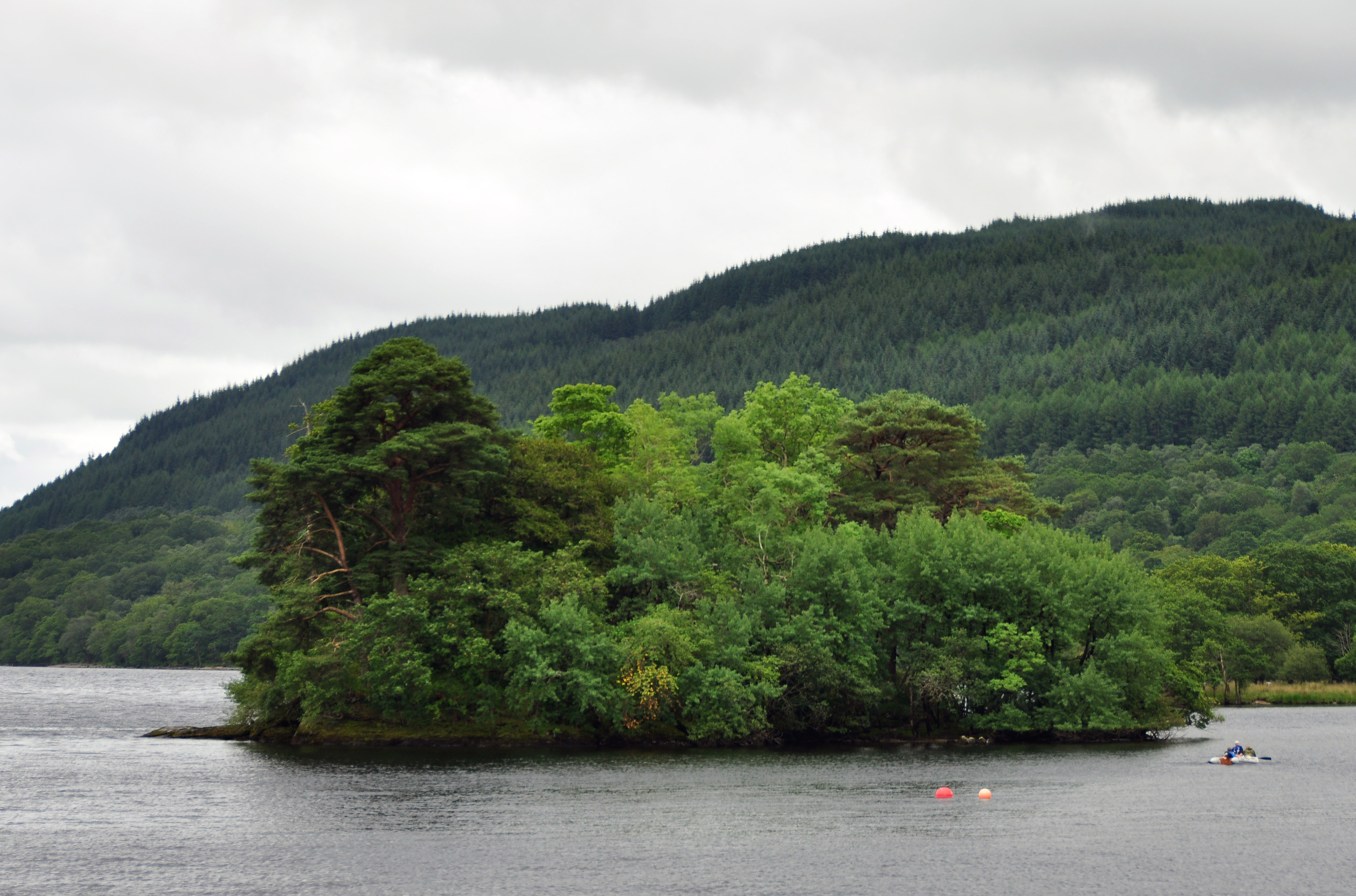

Inveruglas Isle (Scottish Gaelic: Innis Inbhir Dhughlais) is a small uninhabited island within Loch Lomond, and lies off the shore at Inveruglas opposite Inversnaid at the north end of the loch. It is opposite the Loch Sloy powerstation.

The name Inbhir Dhu(bh)ghlais means "mouth of the black stream"; Inveruglas Isle is therefore, quite literally, the island at the mouth of the black stream.

The island houses the ruins of a castle which was once home to the chiefs of the Clan MacFarlane, destroyed in the seventeenth century by Oliver Cromwell's Roundhead troops.
