= List of listed buildings in Dumbarton, West Dunbartonshire =

This is a list of listed buildings in the parish of Dumbarton in West Dunbartonshire, Scotland.

== List ==
| Name | Location | Date listed | Geo-coordinates | Notes | Category | LB number | Image |
|---|---|---|---|---|---|---|---|
| Cardross Road, Notre Dame Roman Catholic Chapel And Convent | | | 55°56′45″N 4°35′37″W | | B | 24870 | Upload Photo |
| Church Street, Courthouse | | | 55°56′40″N 4°33′59″W | | B | 24875 | Upload another image |
| Dumbarton Castle | | | 55°56′12″N 4°33′48″W | | A | 24880 | Upload another image |
| Levengrove Park Lodge & Gatepiers | | | 55°56′33″N 4°34′38″W | | B | 24904 | Upload Photo |
| Overtoun Gatepiers at West Lodge on Stirling Road | | | 55°56′53″N 4°32′52″W | | B | 24911 | Upload another image |
| Stirling Road Dumbarton Cemetery, Walls Gates And Gatepiers | | | 55°57′07″N 4°33′00″W | | B | 24913 | Upload another image See more images |
| West Bridgend, West Kirk Hall And Gatepiers | | | 55°56′44″N 4°34′45″W | | B | 24919 | Upload Photo |
| Entrance To Vale of Leven Industrial Estate | | | 55°58′07″N 4°34′22″W | | B | 824 | Upload Photo |
| 125-9 (Odd Numbers) College Street/1, 2 Station Road | | | 55°56′46″N 4°34′08″W | | C(S) | 24878 | Upload another image |
| 17-21 (Odd Numbers) High Street | | | 55°56′35″N 4°34′09″W | | B | 24886 | Upload another image |
| 127-135 (Odd Numbers) High Street | | | 55°56′37″N 4°34′20″W | | B | 24888 | Upload Photo |
| Kirktonhill 15 Dixon Drive, Shamrockbank | | | 55°56′25″N 4°34′53″W | | C(S) | 24891 | Upload Photo |
| Kirktonhill 38 Helenslee Road Methlan Park House | | | 55°56′23″N 4°34′48″W | | B | 24901 | Upload Photo |
| Levengrove Park War Memorial | | | 55°56′18″N 4°34′31″W | | C(S) | 24905 | Upload Photo |
| Maclean Place Former Prison Gateway Including Adjacent Walls, Windows And Carved Stone | | | 55°56′40″N 4°33′58″W | | B | 24906 | Upload another image See more images |
| Overtoun House Gatepiers at South Drive | | | 55°56′52″N 4°31′27″W | | C(S) | 24909 | Upload Photo |
| 2 Cardross Road, St Michael's Roman Catholic Church | | | 55°56′54″N 4°34′59″W | | B | 24871 | Upload Photo |
| Castle Street, Napier Mausoleum (Behind Riverside Parish Church) | | | 55°56′35″N 4°34′00″W | | C(S) | 24872 | Upload Photo |
| Castle Street, Ship Model Experiment Tank (British Shipbuilders - Formerly Vickers Ltd) | | | 55°56′36″N 4°33′46″W | | A | 24873 | Upload Photo |
| Church Street, Sseb Education Offices (Former Academy) | | | 55°56′38″N 4°34′01″W | | A | 24874 | Upload another image |
| Overtoun Terrace 205-209 (Odd Nos) Glasgow Road | | | 55°56′29″N 4°33′02″W | | C(S) | 24884 | Upload Photo |
| High Street St Augustine's Episcopal Church | | | 55°56′37″N 4°34′06″W | | A | 24890 | Upload another image See more images |
| Kirktonhill, 10, 12 Dixon Drive | | | 55°56′28″N 4°34′47″W | | B | 24894 | Upload Photo |
| Overtoun House And Garden Walls | | | 55°57′08″N 4°31′29″W | | A | 24907 | Upload Photo |
| Coach House Range And Stable Yard, Strathleven | | | 55°58′09″N 4°34′09″W | | B | 822 | Upload Photo |
| King's Way, Dalreoch Primary School | | | 55°57′10″N 4°35′19″W | | B | 50122 | Upload Photo |
| Bonhill Road, Westonlee House, And Gatepiers | | | 55°56′56″N 4°33′41″W | | B | 24868 | Upload Photo |
| 20, 22 Cardross Road, Braehead Cottages | | | 55°56′51″N 4°35′06″W | | B | 24869 | Upload Photo |
| Glasgow Road, Peter Denny Statue, (At Municipal Buildings) | | | 55°56′44″N 4°34′03″W | | B | 24882 | Upload another image |
| High Street, The Bell Leisure Centre (Former High Church) | | | 55°56′38″N 4°34′24″W | | B | 24889 | Upload Photo |
| Kirktonhill 2, 4 Dixon Drive And Gatepiers | | | 55°56′27″N 4°34′41″W | | C(S) | 24892 | Upload Photo |
| Kirktonhill, Helenslee Road Roadbridge | | | 55°56′36″N 4°34′42″W | | C(S) | 24895 | Upload Photo |
| Kirktonhill, Helenslee Road Garmoyle Carmelite Monastery And Garden Walls | | | 55°56′29″N 4°34′54″W | | B | 24900 | Upload Photo |
| Overtoun House, Bridge at Garshake Drive Over Overtoun Burn | | | 55°57′10″N 4°31′31″W | | B | 24908 | Upload another image See more images |
| 16 Round Riding Road, Greenfield | | | 55°56′55″N 4°33′30″W | | C(S) | 24912 | Upload Photo |
| Church Street, College Bow (Former Tower Arch of St Mary's Collegiate Church) | | | 55°56′45″N 4°34′01″W | | B | 24876 | Upload another image See more images |
| Church Street, Dumbarton Central Station | | | 55°56′48″N 4°34′03″W | | A | 24877 | Upload Photo |
| Dumbarton Bridge (Over River Leven) | | | 55°56′39″N 4°34′31″W | | B | 24879 | Upload another image |
| Kirktonhill Helenslee Road Keil School Lodge And Gatepiers | | | 55°56′35″N 4°34′57″W | | B | 24898 | Upload Photo |
| 38 Helenslee Road Methlan Park House Lodge And Gatepiers | | | 55°56′23″N 4°34′42″W | | C(S) | 24902 | Upload Photo |
| Overtoun West Lodge on Stirling Road | | | 55°56′53″N 4°32′52″W | | B | 24910 | Upload Photo |
| West Bridgend, Levenford House Garden Walls And Gateway | | | 55°56′42″N 4°34′43″W | | B | 24917 | Upload Photo |
| West Bridgend, Levenford House Lodge And Former Stables (On Helenslee Road) | | | 55°56′37″N 4°34′41″W | | B | 24918 | Upload Photo |
| Strathleven House | | | 55°58′09″N 4°34′17″W | | A | 115 | Upload another image |
| Glasgow Road Municipal Buildings And Gatepiers | | | 55°56′46″N 4°34′02″W | | B | 24881 | Upload another image |
| High Street, Dumbarton Riverside Parish Church, Cemetery Walls And Gateways | | | 55°56′35″N 4°34′02″W | | A | 24885 | Upload another image |
| High Street, Glencairn Tenement (Gas Board Offices) | | | 55°56′35″N 4°34′17″W | | B | 24887 | Upload another image |
| Kirktonhill 6, 8 Dixon Drive | | | 55°56′27″N 4°34′44″W | | C(S) | 24893 | Upload Photo |
| West Bridgend, Levenford House | | | 55°56′41″N 4°34′45″W | | A | 24916 | Upload another image |
| Kirktonhill Helenslee Road Keil School (Formerly Helenslee) | | | 55°56′29″N 4°35′06″W | | B | 24896 | Upload Photo |
| Latta Street, Hartfield House | | | 55°56′52″N 4°33′40″W | | C(S) | 24903 | Upload Photo |
| Strathleven Place St Patrick's Rc Church, Tower And Gatepiers | | | 55°56′44″N 4°33′51″W | | B | 24914 | Upload another image See more images |
| Strathleven Place Drumoyne | | | 55°56′44″N 4°33′49″W | | B | 24915 | Upload Photo |
| Dovecot, Strathleven | | | 55°58′11″N 4°34′13″W | | A | 823 | Upload another image |
| Leven Street, United Reformed Church Including Boundary Wall And Railings | | | 55°56′35″N 4°33′38″W | | C(S) | 50543 | Upload Photo |
| 67, 69 Glasgow Road | | | 55°56′37″N 4°33′34″W | | C(S) | 24883 | Upload Photo |
| Helenslee Road Keil School Technical Block (Formerly Helenslee Stables) | | | 55°56′37″N 4°34′58″W | | B | 24897 | Upload Photo |
| West Bridgend, West Kirk | | | 55°56′45″N 4°34′45″W | | B | 24920 | Upload Photo |

== Key ==
The scheme for classifying buildings in Scotland is:

- Category A: "buildings of national or international importance, either architectural or historic; or fine, little-altered examples of some particular period, style or building type."
- Category B: "buildings of regional or more than local importance; or major examples of some particular period, style or building type, which may have been altered."
- Category C: "buildings of local importance; lesser examples of any period, style, or building type, as originally constructed or moderately altered; and simple traditional buildings which group well with other listed buildings."

In March 2016 there were 47,288 listed buildings in Scotland. Of these, 8% were Category A, and 50% were Category B, with the remaining 42% being Category C.
