= Dalreoch =

Settlement in Perth and Kinross, Scotland

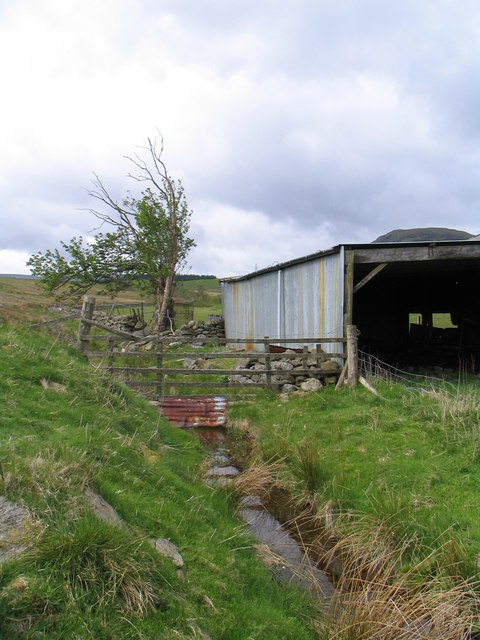
Old cattle shed by Dalreoch

Dalreoch is a small settlement in Perth and Kinross. It lies south of the A9 trunk road 8 miles southwest of Perth.

It is not to be confused with Dalreoch railway station in Dumbarton, West Dunbartonshire.
