= List of listed buildings in Cardross, West Dunbartonshire =

This is a list of listed buildings in the parish of Cardross in West Dunbartonshire, Scotland.

== List ==
Name	Location	Date listed	Geo-coordinates	Notes	Category	LB number	Image
Renton, Kipperoch Road, Kipproch House With Gates And Gatepiers			55°57′44″N 4°36′17″W		C(S)	42923	Upload Photo
Renton, Main Street, War Memorial			55°58′10″N 4°35′03″W		B	42927	Upload Photo
Renton, Dalmoak House, Stable Courtyard And Walled Garden			55°57′35″N 4°35′32″W		B	1161	Upload Photo
Renton, Main Street, Smollett Monument			55°58′11″N 4°35′04″W		A	1168	Upload another image See more images
Renton, Alexander Street, Trinity Parish Church, Church of Scotland With Boundary Wall And Gatepiers			55°58′04″N 4°34′55″W		B	42920	Upload another image
Renton, Main Street, Public Library With Boundary Wall And Railings			55°58′03″N 4°35′04″W		C(S)	42925	Upload another image
Renton, Dalmoak House, North Gates And Gatepiers			55°57′47″N 4°35′11″W		B	42921	Upload Photo
Renton, Kipperoch Road, Kipperoch Farmhouse And Steading			55°57′44″N 4°36′26″W		B	42922	Upload Photo
Renton, Main Street, Argyle Cottage With Boundary Wall And Railings			55°58′09″N 4°35′01″W		C(S)	42924	Upload Photo
Renton, Main Street, Sullivan's Bar			55°58′19″N 4°35′04″W		C(S)	42926	Upload Photo
Renton, 123-127 Main Street, Central Bar			55°58′16″N 4°35′04″W		B	42928	Upload Photo
Renton, 18 And 22 Main Street, With Boundary Wall And Railings			55°58′06″N 4°35′01″W		C(S)	42929	Upload Photo
Renton, Dalmoak House			55°57′34″N 4°35′27″W		A	45600	Upload another image
Renton, Dalmoak House, Mains Lodge With Gates, Gatepiers And Boundary Wall			55°57′27″N 4°35′19″W		B	1163	Upload Photo
Renton, Main Street, Millburn Church, Former Free Church With Boundary Wall, Gravestones, Railings And Gatepiers			55°58′34″N 4°35′06″W		A	1176	Upload Photo

== Key ==
The scheme for classifying buildings in Scotland is:

- Category A: "buildings of national or international importance, either architectural or historic; or fine, little-altered examples of some particular period, style or building type."
- Category B: "buildings of regional or more than local importance; or major examples of some particular period, style or building type, which may have been altered."
- Category C: "buildings of local importance; lesser examples of any period, style, or building type, as originally constructed or moderately altered; and simple traditional buildings which group well with other listed buildings."

In March 2016 there were 47,288 listed buildings in Scotland. Of these, 8% were Category A, and 50% were Category B, with the remaining 42% being Category C.
