= Dunbartonshire =

Coordinates: 55.96°N 4.53°W

Dumbarton Siorrachd Dhùn Breatann
- Historic county
- Country: Scotland
- County town: Dumbarton

Area
  - Total: 241 sq mi (624 km^{2})
- Ranked 29th of 34
- Chapman code: DNB

Dunbartonshire (Scottish Gaelic: Siorrachd Dhùn Breatann) or the County of Dumbarton is a historic county, lieutenancy area and registration county in the west central Lowlands of Scotland lying to the north of the River Clyde. Dunbartonshire borders Perthshire to the north, Stirlingshire to the east, Lanarkshire and Renfrewshire (historic) to the south, and Argyllshire to the west.

The county covered a similar area to the earldom and later duchy of Lennox. The historic county gives its name to two of Scotland's modern council areas, being East Dunbartonshire and West Dunbartonshire.

== Name ==
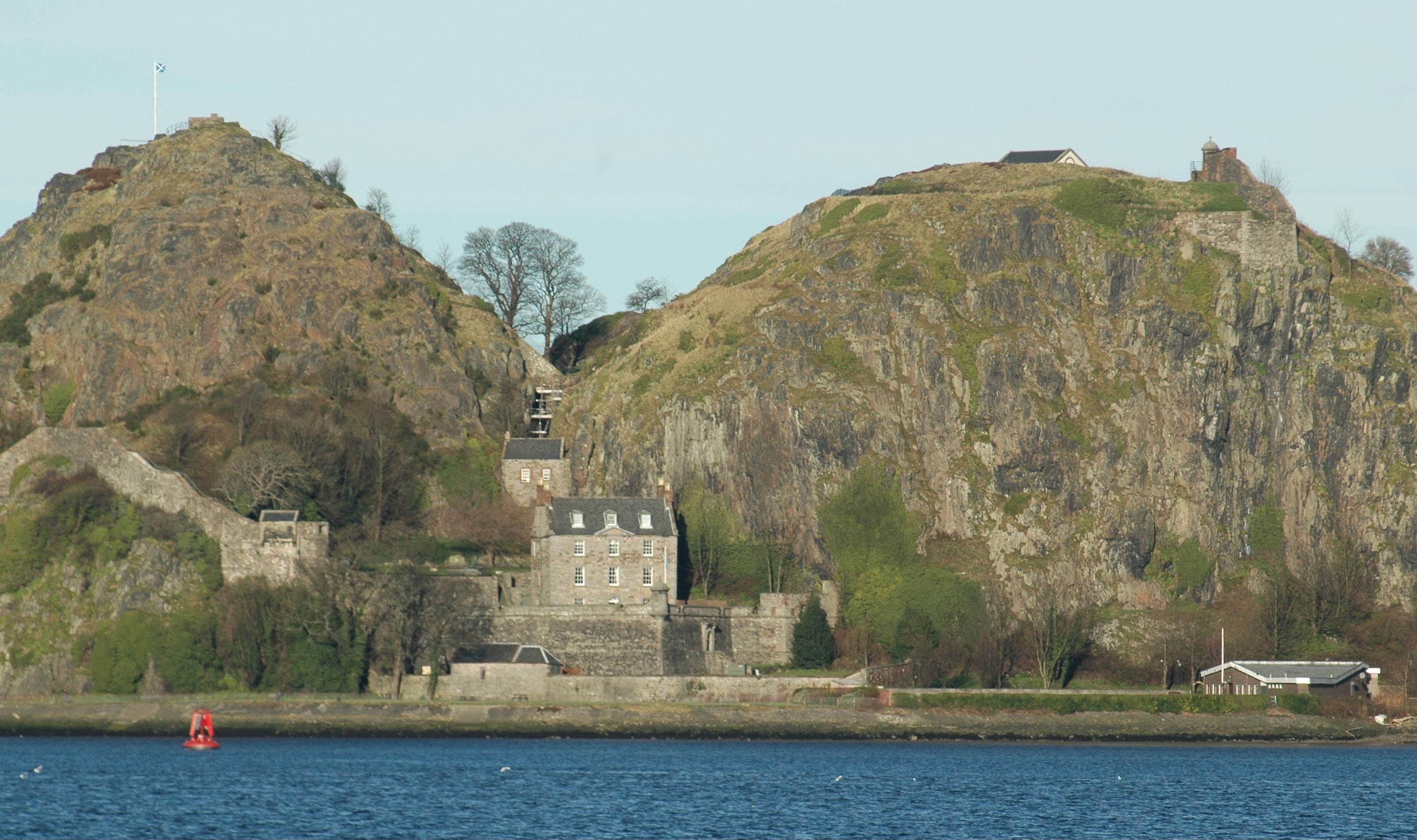
Looking across the River Clyde towards Dumbarton Castle

The town name "Dumbarton" comes from the Scottish Gaelic Dùn Breatainn meaning "fort of the Britons". Historically, the spelling of the county town and the county were not standardised. By the 18th century, the names "County of Dunbarton" and "County of Dumbarton" were used interchangeably. The n in "Dunbarton" represents the etymology Dùn "fort"; the "m" in "Dumbarton" reflects a pronunciation with assimilation of /n/ to the labial /m/, due to the influence of the neighbouring labial /b/ sound.

Different county bodies used the two spellings: the Dunbarton County Constabulary were formed in 1857 by the Commissioners of Supply for the County of Dunbarton.

In 1890, elected county councils were established under the Local Government (Scotland) Act 1889, which referred to the area as the "County of Dumbarton". However, one of the county council's first acts was to adopt an official seal, for which it chose to use the spelling "Dunbarton", with an "n", as being closer to the name's etymology, despite protests from some residents who maintained that the spelling with an "m" was better established in general usage. The town of Dumbarton continued to use the spelling with an "m". Statutory recognition of the spelling with an "n" being used for the county came with the Local Government (Scotland) Act 1947 (10 & 11 Geo. 6. c. 43).

== History ==
Dunbartonshire's origins as a shire (the area administered by a sheriff) are obscure, but it had become a shire by the end of the twelfth century. The shire of Dumbarton was initially similar in area to the earldom of Lennox, covering an area north of the River Clyde and around Loch Lomond. In the thirteenth century, an area north-east of Loch Lomond was transferred to Stirlingshire, whilst the two parishes of Kirkintilloch and Cumbernauld were transferred from Stirlingshire to Dunbartonshire, despite not adjoining the rest of the county. The changes were reversed in 1504, when Kirkintilloch and Cumbernauld were restored to Stirlingshire and the area north-east of Loch Lomond came back to Dunbartonshire, but the change was short-lived, being reverted again in 1509.

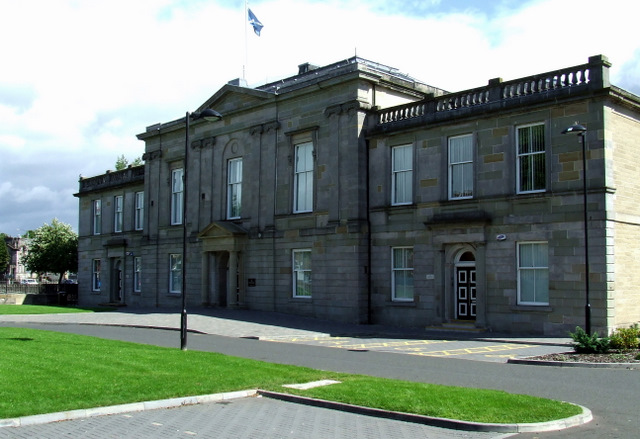
Dumbarton Sheriff Court and County Buildings

Commissioners of Supply were established in 1667 to act as the main administrative body for the shire outside the burghs. Elected county councils were established in 1890 under the Local Government (Scotland) Act 1889, taking most of the functions of the commissioners (which were eventually abolished in 1930). The burgh of Dumbarton was deemed capable of managing its own affairs and so was excluded from the administrative area of the county council, although the county council still chose to base itself in that town. The county council held its first meeting on 22 May 1890 at the County Buildings (which also served as the sheriff court) on Church Street in Dumbarton. The 1889 act also led to a review of boundaries; in the case of Dunbartonshire, the parish of New Kilpatrick had previously straddled Dunbartonshire and Stirlingshire, with the town of Milngavie being in the part of the parish in Stirlingshire. The parish was brought entirely within Dunbartonshire on 15 May 1891.

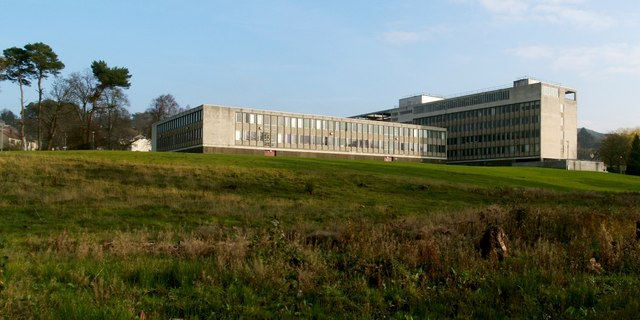
County Buildings, Dumbarton

Reforms to local government in 1930 saw the burgh of Dumbarton brought within the administrative area of the county council. The county council was based at the old county buildings at the sheriff court until 1965, when it moved to new County Buildings on Garshake Road in Dumbarton. The new building was formally opened by Queen Elizabeth II, accompanied by the Duke of Edinburgh, on 28 June 1965 during a royal visit to the area.

Dunbartonshire was abolished for local government purposes in 1975 under the Local Government (Scotland) Act 1973, becoming part of the large Strathclyde Region. Strathclyde was divided into nineteen districts, with Dunbartonshire being divided between Dumbarton, Bearsden and Milngavie, Clydebank, Cumbernauld and Kilsyth and Strathkelvin Districts. The combined area of these five districts continued to be used as a lieutenancy area.

Local government in Scotland was reorganised again in 1996, with the regions and districts abolished and replaced with unitary council areas. Two of the new council areas include Dunbartonshire in their name. Since 1996, the area of the pre-1975 county of Dunbartonshire has been split between four council areas:

- East Dunbartonshire Council, with its administrative headquarters at Kirkintilloch (also includes parts of the pre-1975 counties of Stirlingshire and Lanarkshire).
- West Dunbartonshire Council, with its administrative centre at Dumbarton.
- Argyll and Bute Council (which took over the Helensburgh and Lomond part of Dumbarton District).
- North Lanarkshire (for the Cumbernauld area).

The Dunbartonshire lieutenancy area continues to be defined in terms of the five districts that existed between 1975 and 1996, with the only change made to the lieutenancy areas at the time of the 1996 local government reorganisation being that the Chryston area of Strathkelvin district was transferred to the Lanarkshire lieutenancy. The historic boundaries of Dunbartonshire are still used for land registration purposes, being a registration county.

== Geography ==
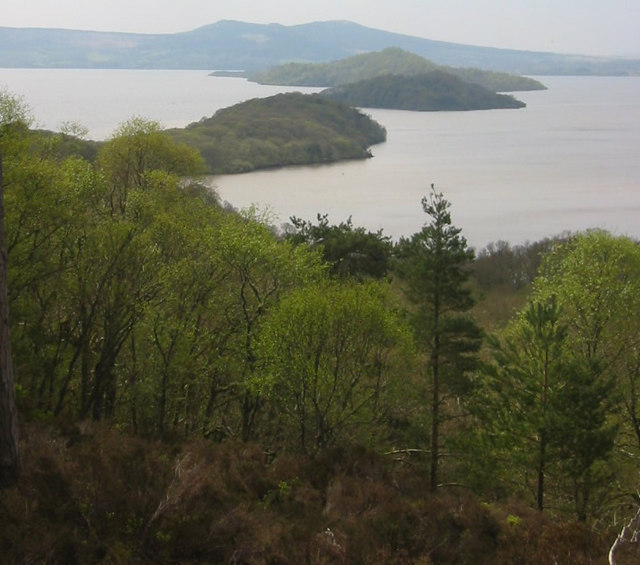
Loch Lomond as seen from the summit of the island of Inchcailloch to Torrinch, Creinch, Inchmurrin and Ben Bowie

The northern half of the county is sparsely populated and dominated by Loch Lomond (now part of Loch Lomond and The Trossachs National Park), which it shares with Stirlingshire. There are many islands in the loch that form part of the county, the most notable being Island I Vow, Tarbet Isle, Inchlonaig, Inchconnachan, Inchmoan, Inchtavannach, Fraoch Eilean, Inchgalbraith, Torrinch, Creinch, Inchmurrin and Aber Isle. The much smaller Geal Loch, Lochan Beinn Damhain, Lochan Strath Dubh-uisge, and Loch Sloy can also be found here. The area is also home to Ben Vorlich, the highest point of Dunbartonshire at 943 m (3,094 ft) and the 229th tallest mountain in Scotland.

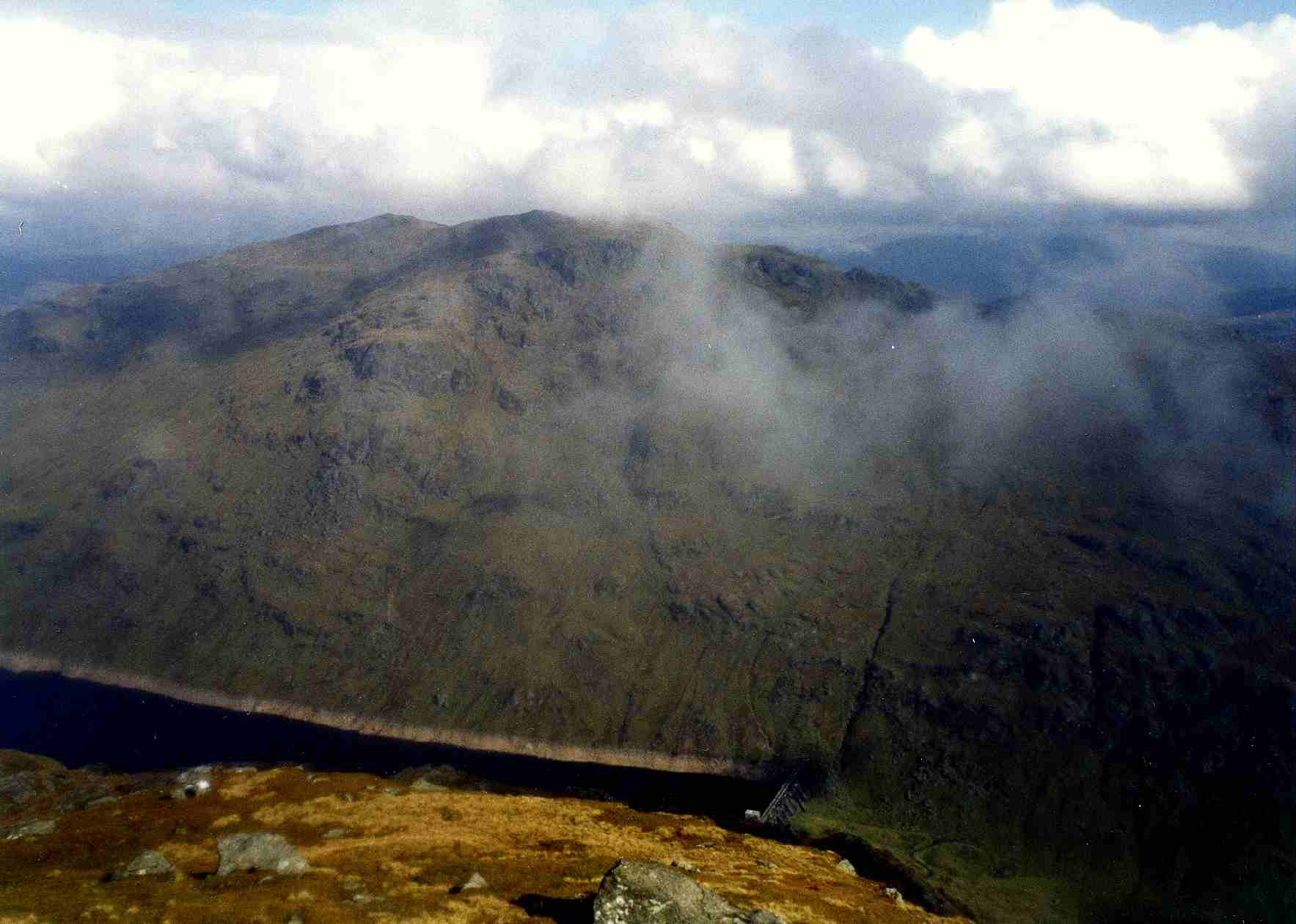
Ben Vorlich, the tallest mountain in Dunbartonshire

South-western Dunbartonshire has a long coastline along Loch Long, culminating in the Rosneath peninsula, which is separated from the main body of the county by Gare Loch. Both of these lead into the Firth of Clyde, which forms the southern border. The area east of the river Leven is dominated geographically by the Kilpatrick Hills, which also contains a number of small lochs and reservoirs. In the far south-east, the county encompasses a portion of the Greater Glasgow conurbation.

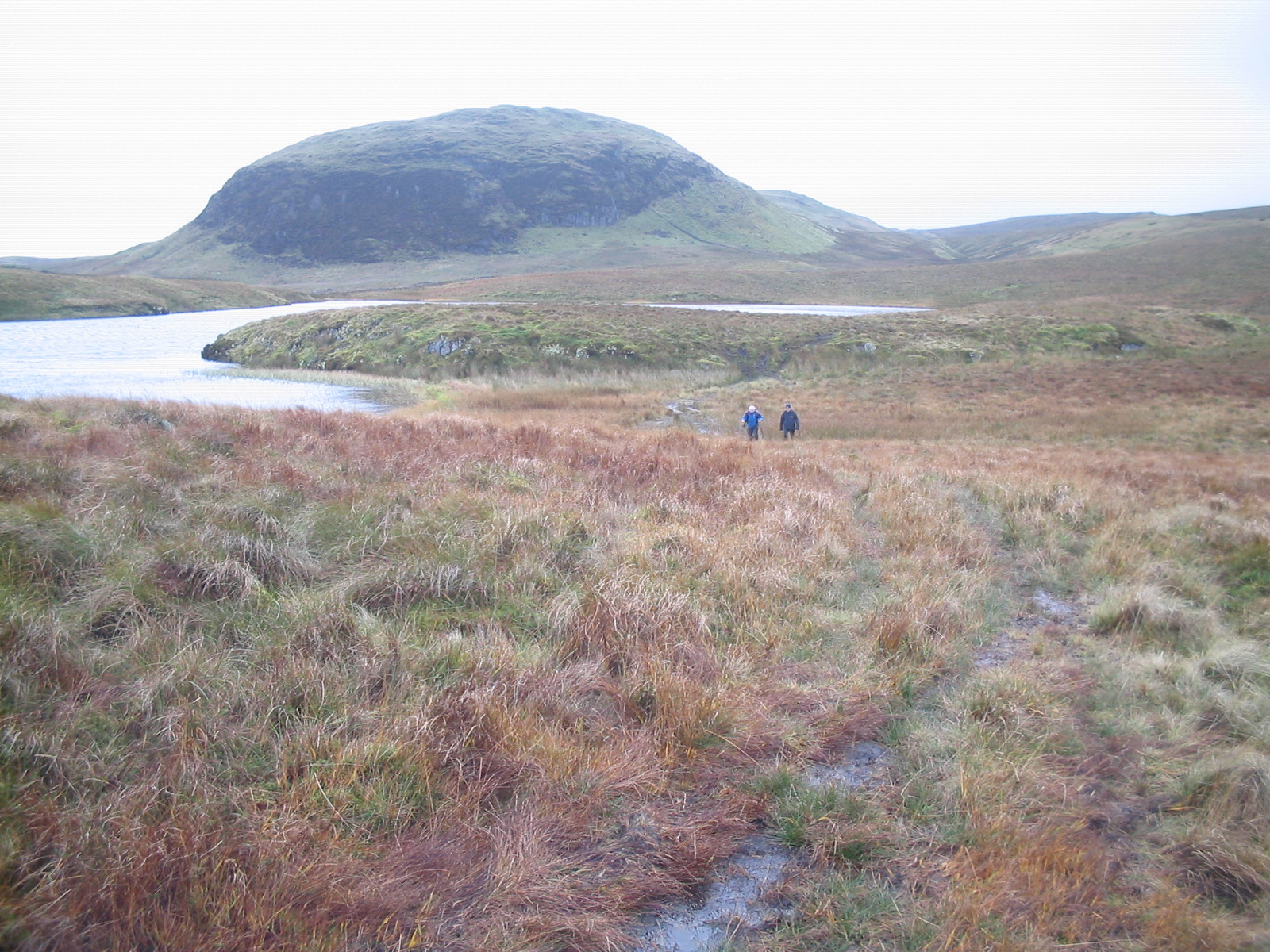
Duncolm, tallest peak in the Kilpatrick Hills

The Cumbernauld exclave is largely flat and heavily urbanised.

=== Boundaries and the Cumbernauld exclave ===
The county retained a large exclave situated five miles (eight kilometres) east of the main part of the county despite the boundary changes in the 1890s elsewhere in Scotland, consisting of the civil parishes of Kirkintilloch and Cumbernauld, between Stirlingshire and Lanarkshire. This area had originally been part of Stirlingshire, but had been annexed to Dunbarton in the reign of David II at the request of Malcolm Fleming, Earl of Wigtown, the owner of the land, who was also Sheriff of Dumbarton.

The exclave was dealt with in 19th century legislation as greater administrative duties were given to the counties.

The Police (Scotland) Act 1857 established police forces throughout Scotland. Section 70 of the act allowed for the parishes to be transferred to the jurisdiction of either Stirlingshire or Lanarkshire Constabulary on resolution of two-thirds of the Commissioners of Supply for the County of Dumbarton.

Similar provisions allowing for the transfer of the area for all purposes were included in the County General Assessment (Scotland) Act 1868. No such resolution was made, and the two parishes remained in Dunbartonshire.

Section 40 of the Roads and Bridges (Scotland) Act 1878 (41 & 42 Vict. c. 51) provided that for the purposes of that act all detached parts of counties should be placed in the county by which they were surrounded, or with which they had the longest boundary. Accordingly, Cumbernauld and Kirkintilloch came under the control of the Stirlingshire Road Board. It was originally anticipated that the area would be transferred to Stirlingshire for all other purposes by the boundary commissioners proposed by the Local Government Bill of 1889. However, a clause was inserted in the bill that stated "the parishes of Cumbernauld and Kirkintilloch, including the burghs and police burghs situate therein, shall for the purposes of this Act, be considered as forming part of the county of Dumbarton". The clause was vigorously opposed by the Stirlingshire Commissioners of Supply as they had incurred considerable expense in maintaining the roads of the two parishes. The Act as passed provided that the Dunbartonshire County Council was to financially compensate Stirlingshire on the transfer of road powers.

== Transport ==
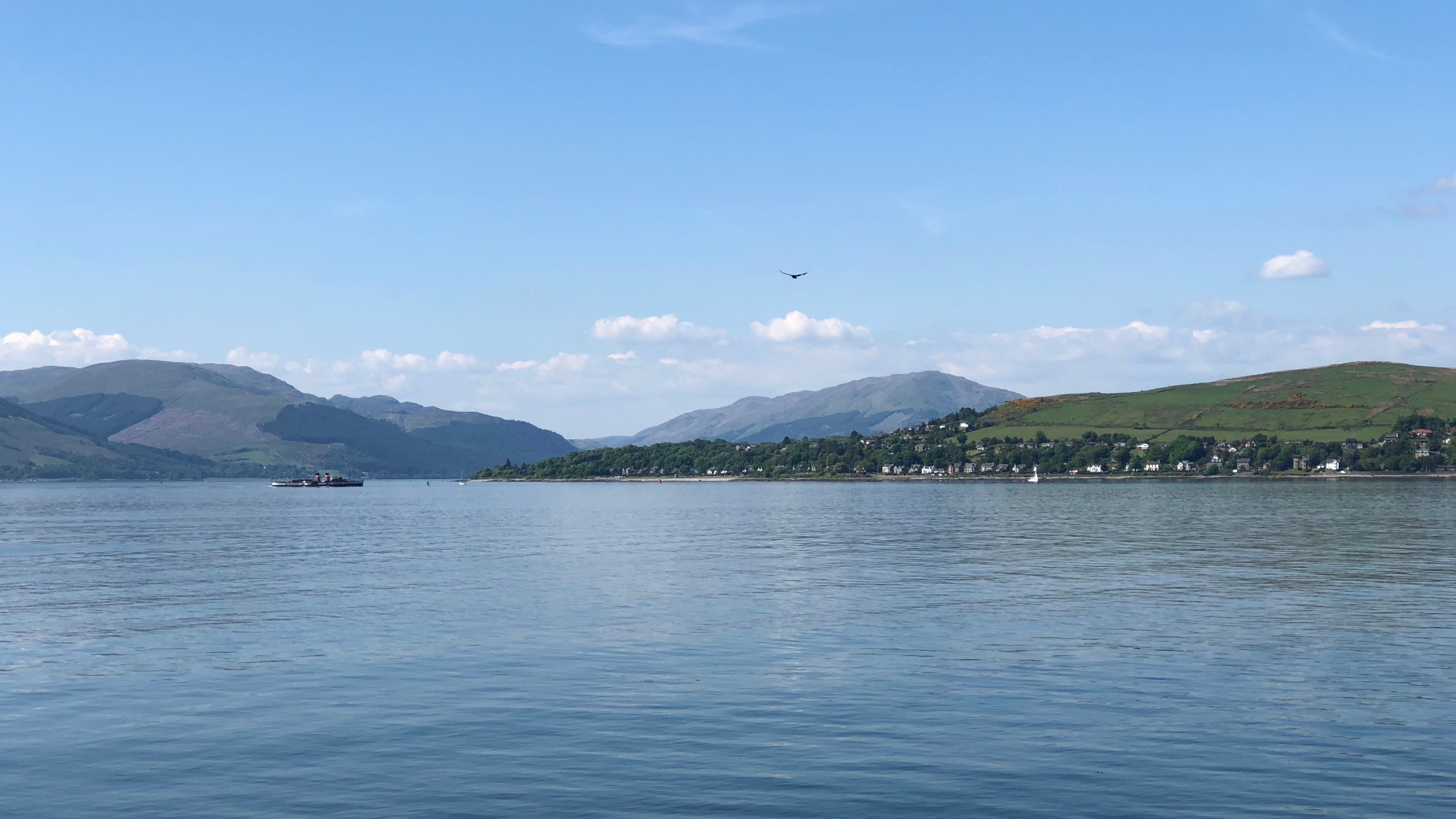
The Firth of Clyde at Kilcreggan, with PS Waverley approaching across Loch Long

The West Highland Line runs through the county connecting Glasgow to Oban and Fort William and is popular with tourist due to its scenic view of the Highlands. The North Clyde line serves the towns of the Vale of Leven, and many suburban and commuter lines serve those parts of Dunbartonshire that form part of the Glasgow conurbation. Two lines run west–east through the Cumbernauld exclave, linking this area to Glasgow and Falkirk.

Various ferries criss-cross Loch Lomond, linking some of the towns along its banks. The Rosneath peninsula is connected by a ferry from Kilcreggan to Gourock in Renfrewshire.

== Settlements ==
=== Towns ===
- Alexandria
- Balloch
- Clydebank
- Dumbarton
- Helensburgh

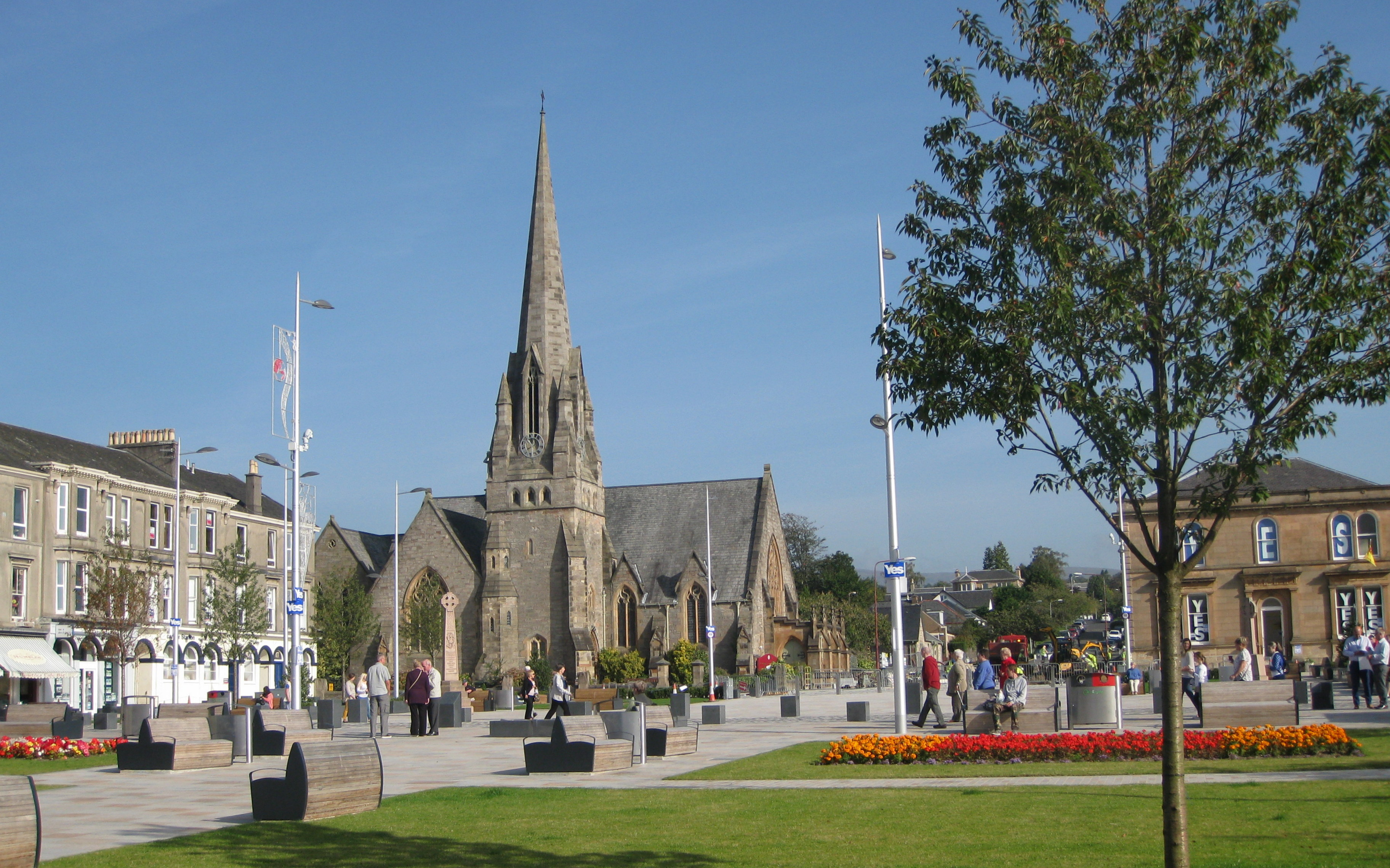
Colquhoun Square, Helensburgh

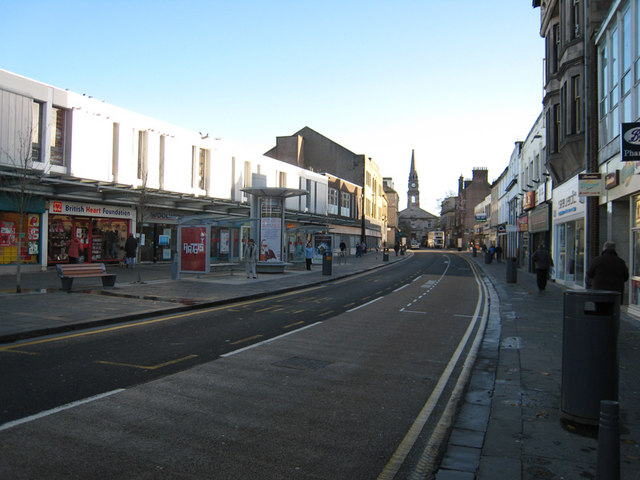
Dumbarton town centre

=== Villages and hamlets ===
- Aldochlay
- Ardlui
- Ardpeaton
- Arrochar
- Auchenvennel
- Bellsmyre
- Blairglas
- Blairvadach
- Bonhill
- Bowling
- Caldarvan
- Cardross
- Clynder
- Cove
- Craigendoran
- Croftamie
- Dalreoch
- Dumfin
- Edentaggart
- Garelochhead
- Gartocharn
- Hardgate
- Inverbeg
- Inveruglas
- Jamestown
- Kilcreggan
- Luss
- Milton
- Old Kilpatrick
- Portincaple
- Portkil
- Rahane
- Renton
- Rhu
- Rosneath
- Shandon
- Shantron
- Stuckgowan
- Tarbet
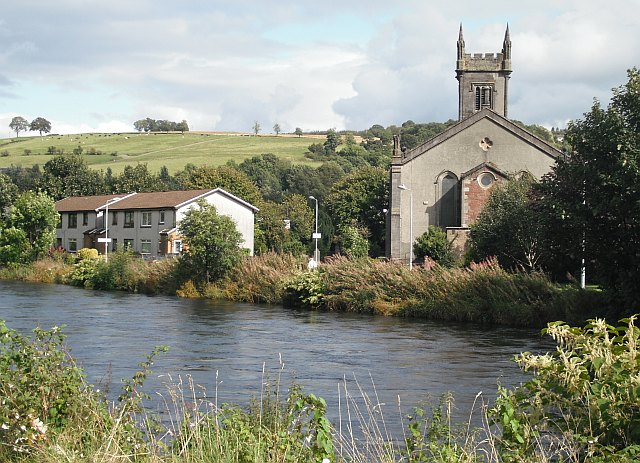
Bonhill

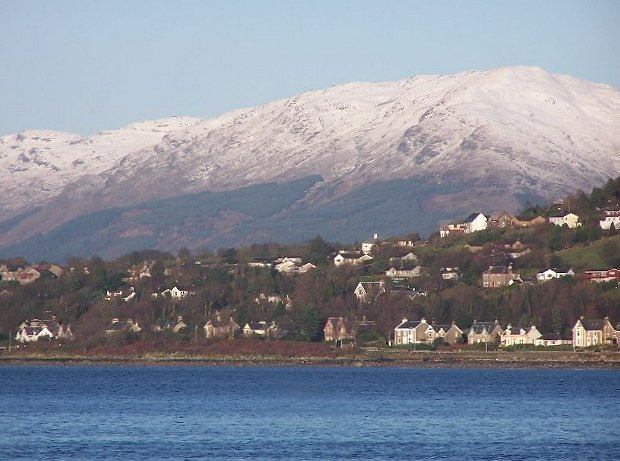
Kilcreggan

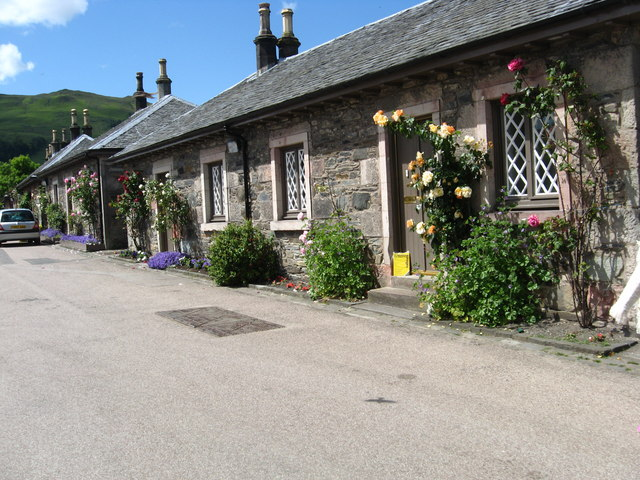
Luss

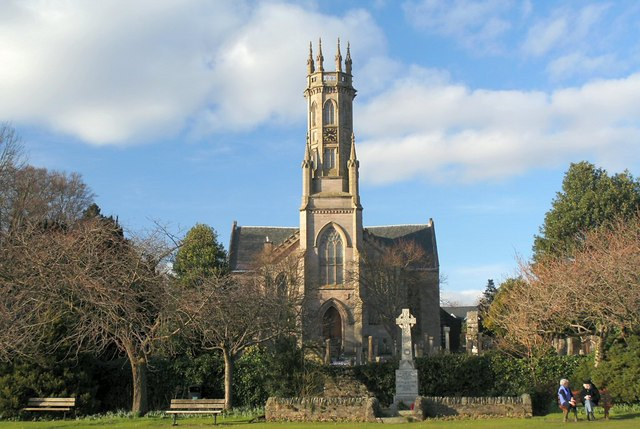
Rhu

=== Glasgow conurbation ===
- Bearsden (Note: Small part in Stirlingshire)
- Blairdardie
- Clydebank
- Dalmuir
- Drumchapel
- Drumry
- Duntocher
- Faifley
- Kilpatrick
- Knightswood (Note: Partly in Renfrewshire)
- Linnvale
- Milngavie (Note: Mostly in Stirlingshire)
- Netherton
- Old Drumchapel
- Temple
- Whitecrook
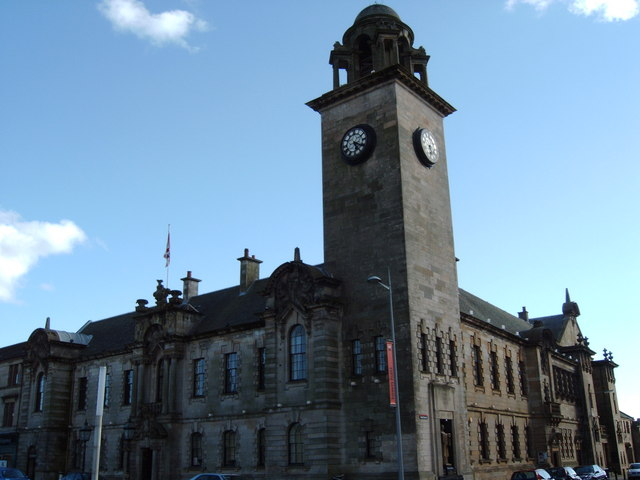
Clydebank Town Hall

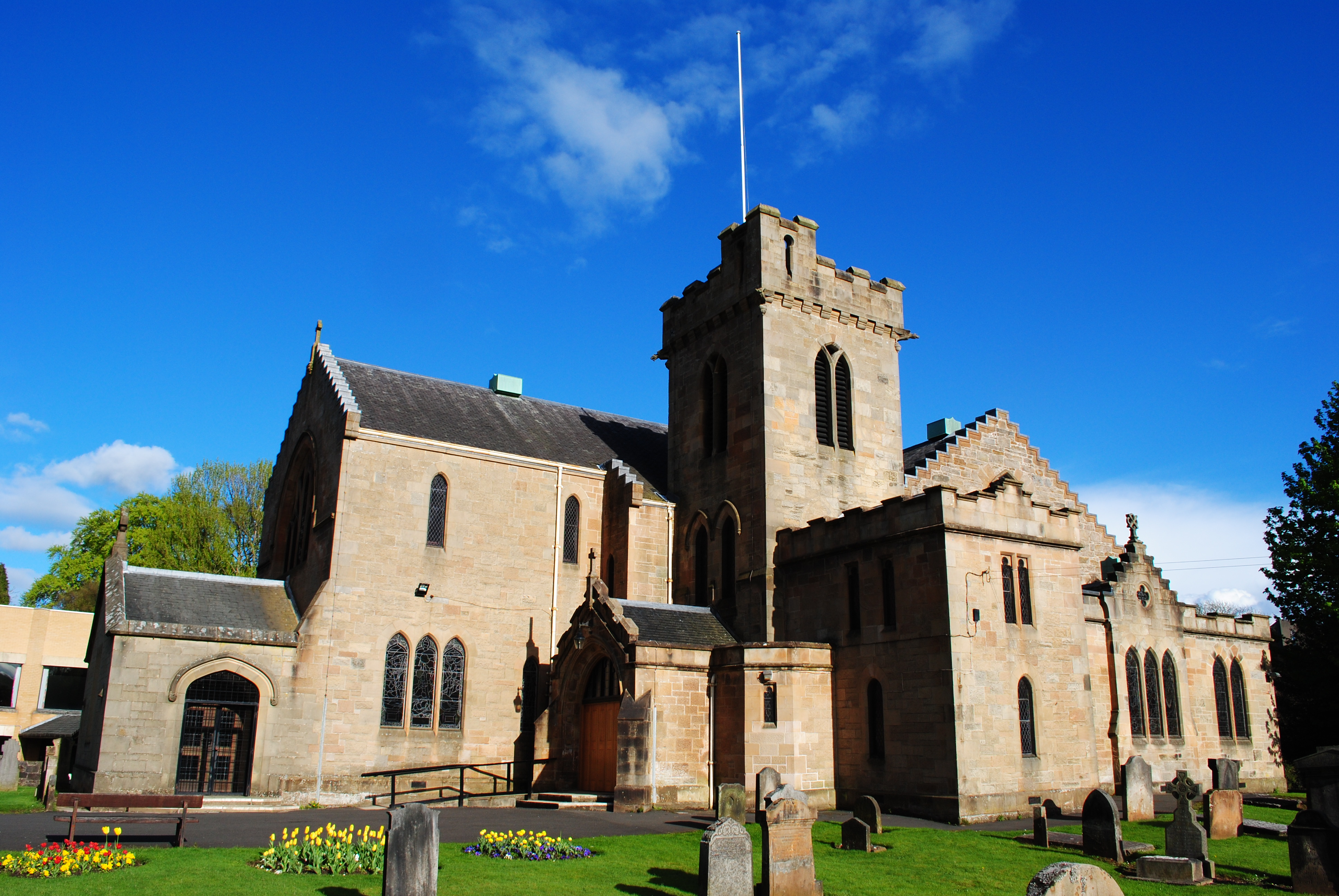
New Kilpatrick Parish Church, Bearsden

=== Cumbernauld exclave ===
- Abronhill
- Auchinstarry
- Balloch
- Blackwood
- Carbrain
- Craigmarloch
- Croy
- Cumbernauld
- Dullatur
- Greenfaulds
- Kildrum
- Kirkintilloch
- Lenzie
- Lenziemill
- Merkland
- Seafar
- Smithstone
- Twechar
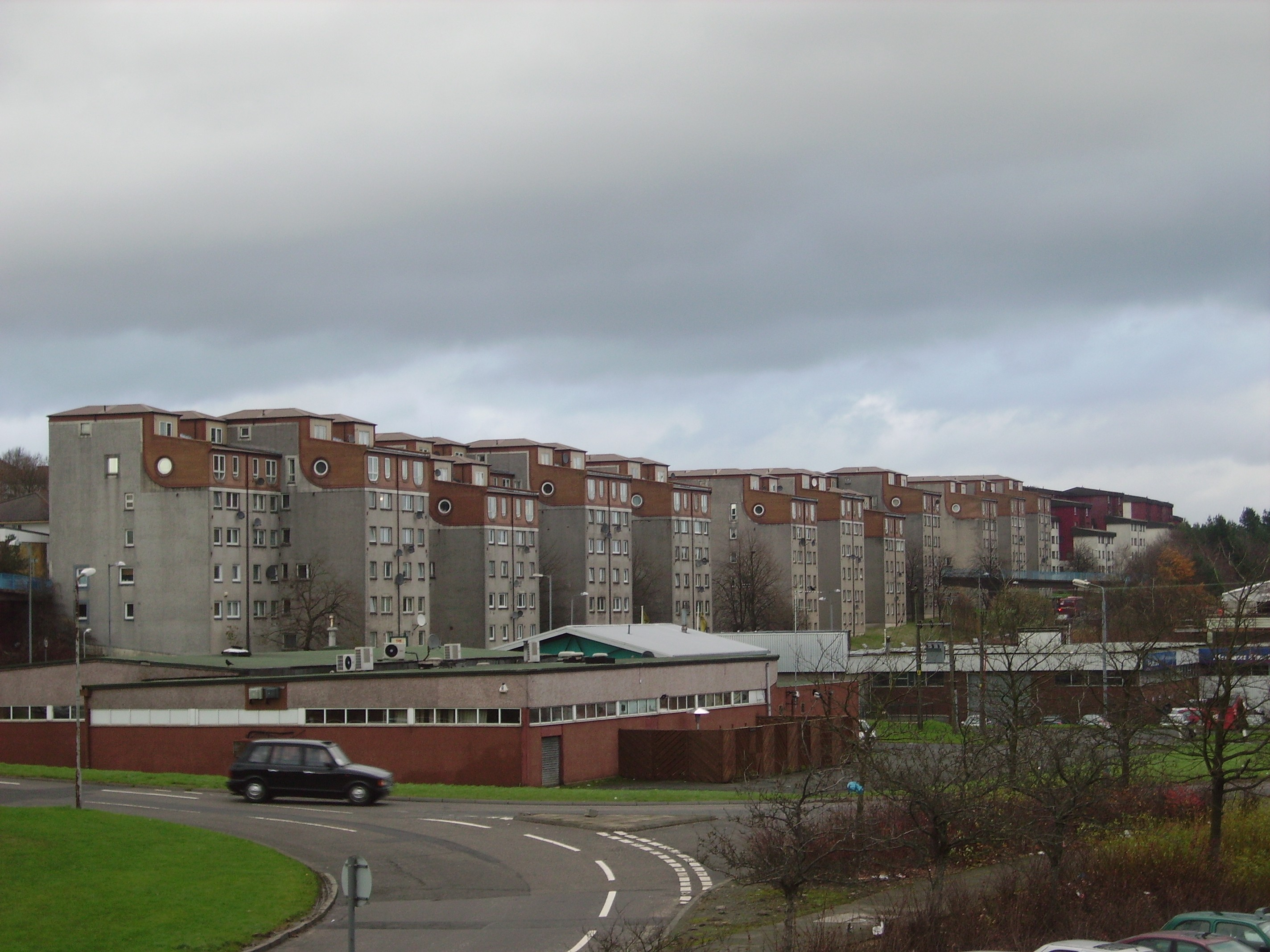
Carbrain

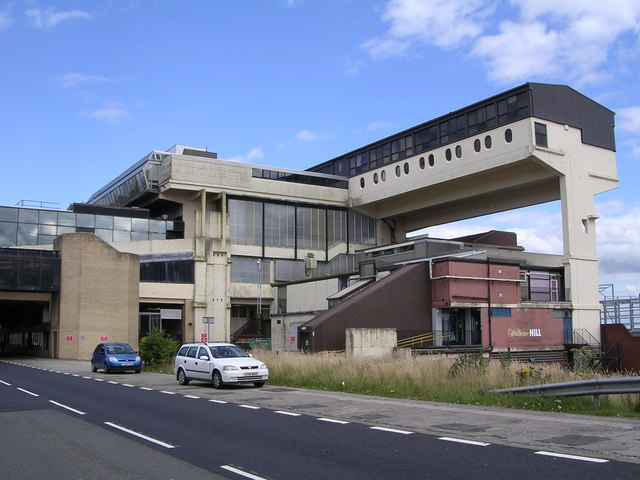
Cumbernauld

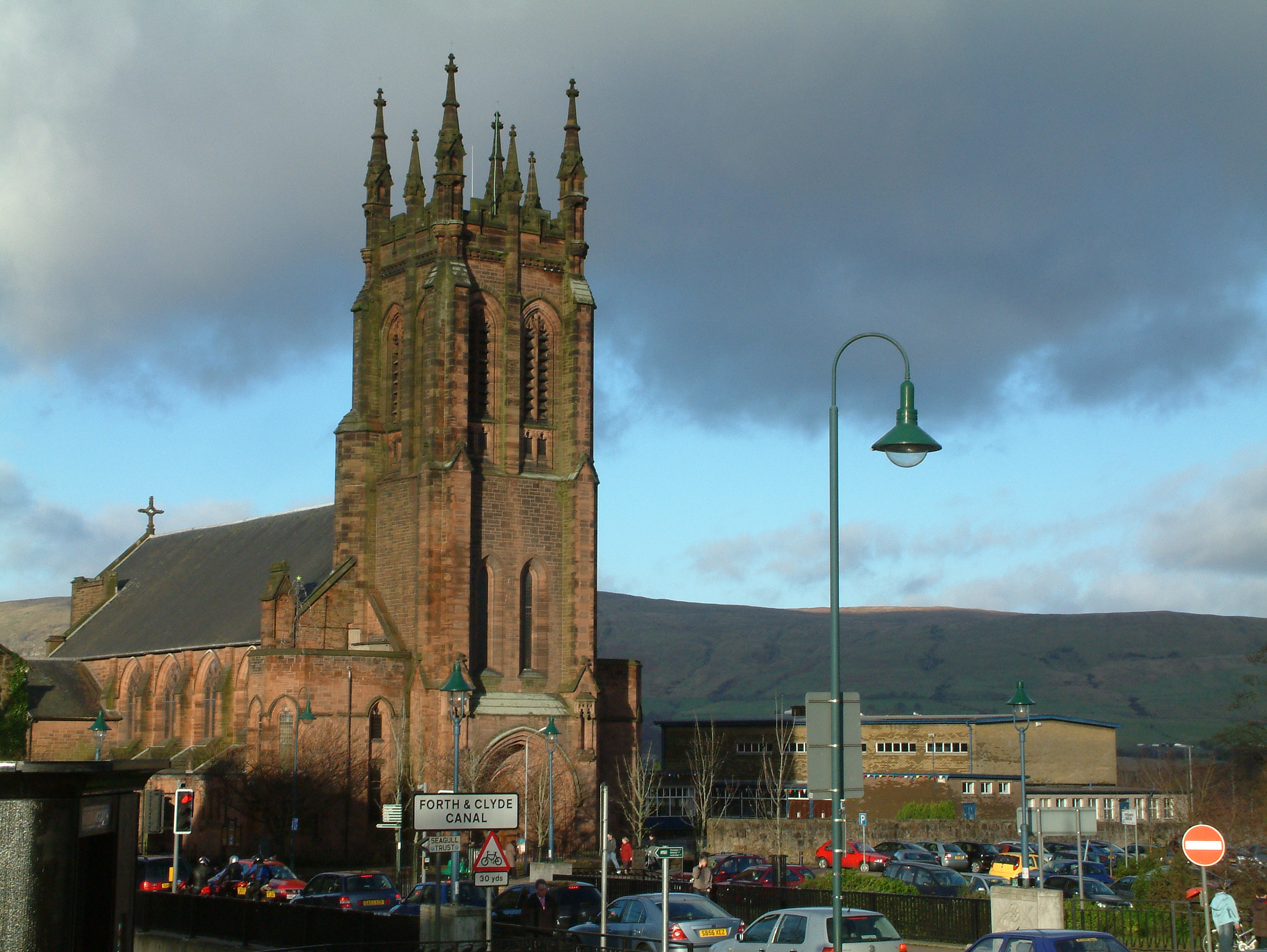
Kirkintilloch

== Civil parishes ==
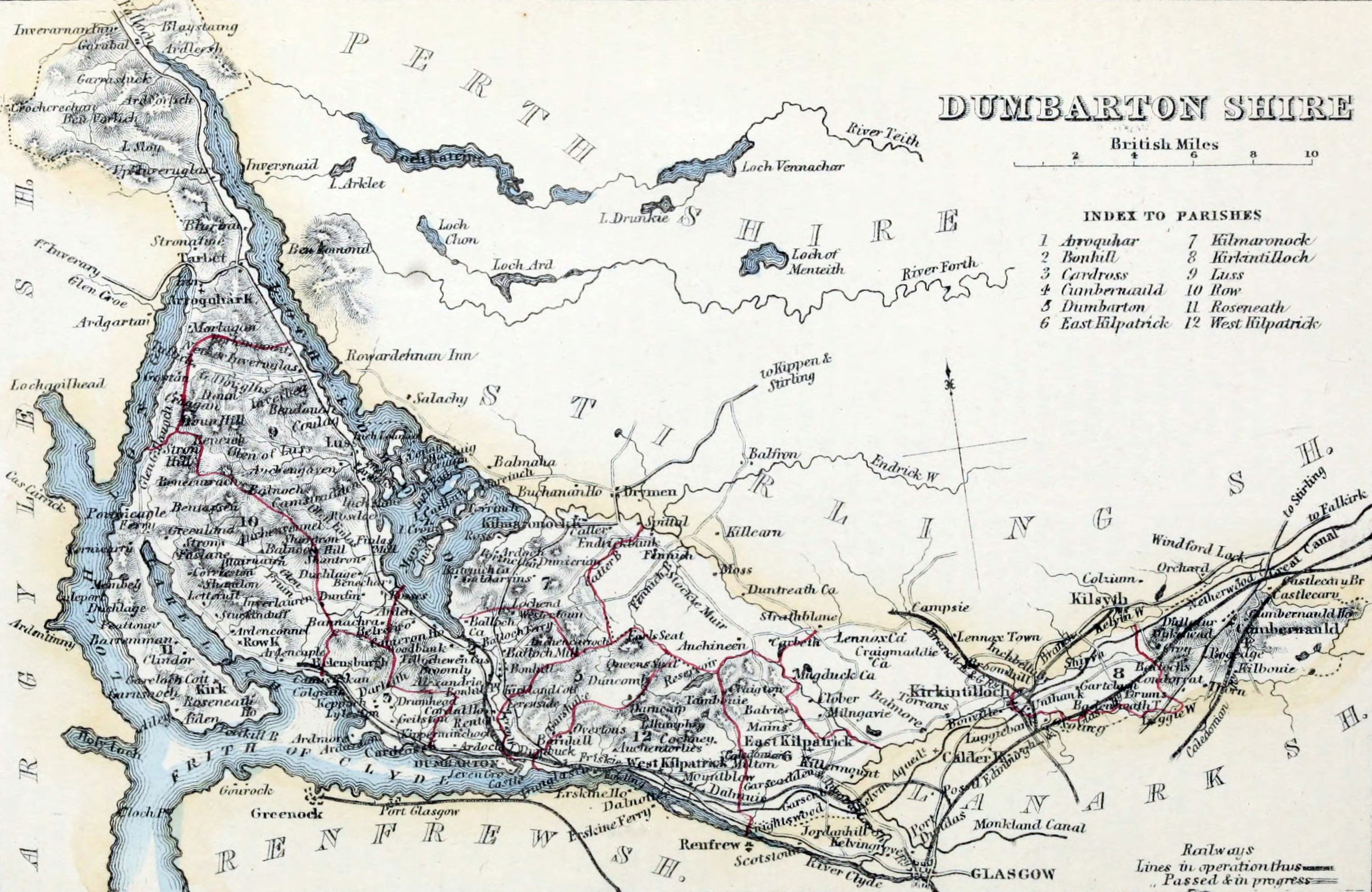
Dumbartonshire Civil Parish map c. 1854 Boundaries are outlined in red

- Arrochar
- Bonhill
- Cardross
- Craigrownie
- Cumbernauld
- Dalreoch
- Dumbarton
- Kilmaronock
- Kirkintilloch
- Luss
- New Kilpatrick
- Old Kilpatrick
- Renton
- Rhu
- Rosneath
- Rossdhu

== Military connections ==
During the expansion of the Volunteer Force, the military presence in Dunbartonshire was widely expanded.

== Bibliography ==
- "The Book of Dumbartonshire", J. Scott Keltie in Macmillan's Magazine, Vol. LXII, May to Oct., 1880, pp. 33–42
- A Short History of Dumbartonshire I.M.M. MacPhail
