= Loch Bowie =

Loch in Dunbartonshire, Scotland

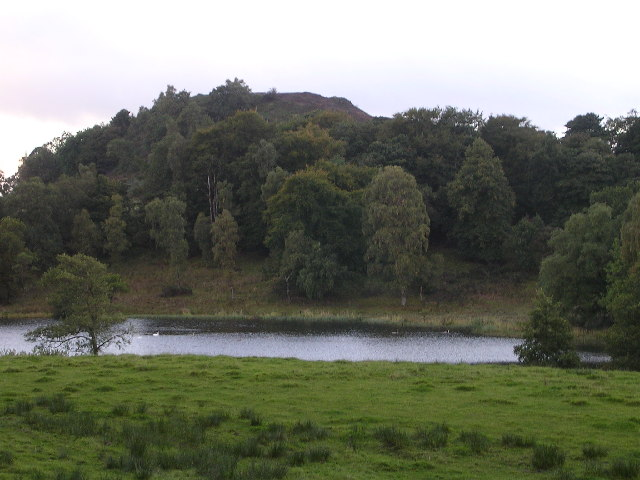
- Loch Bowie. The small hill behind is the medieval fort of Dunbowie Dun.

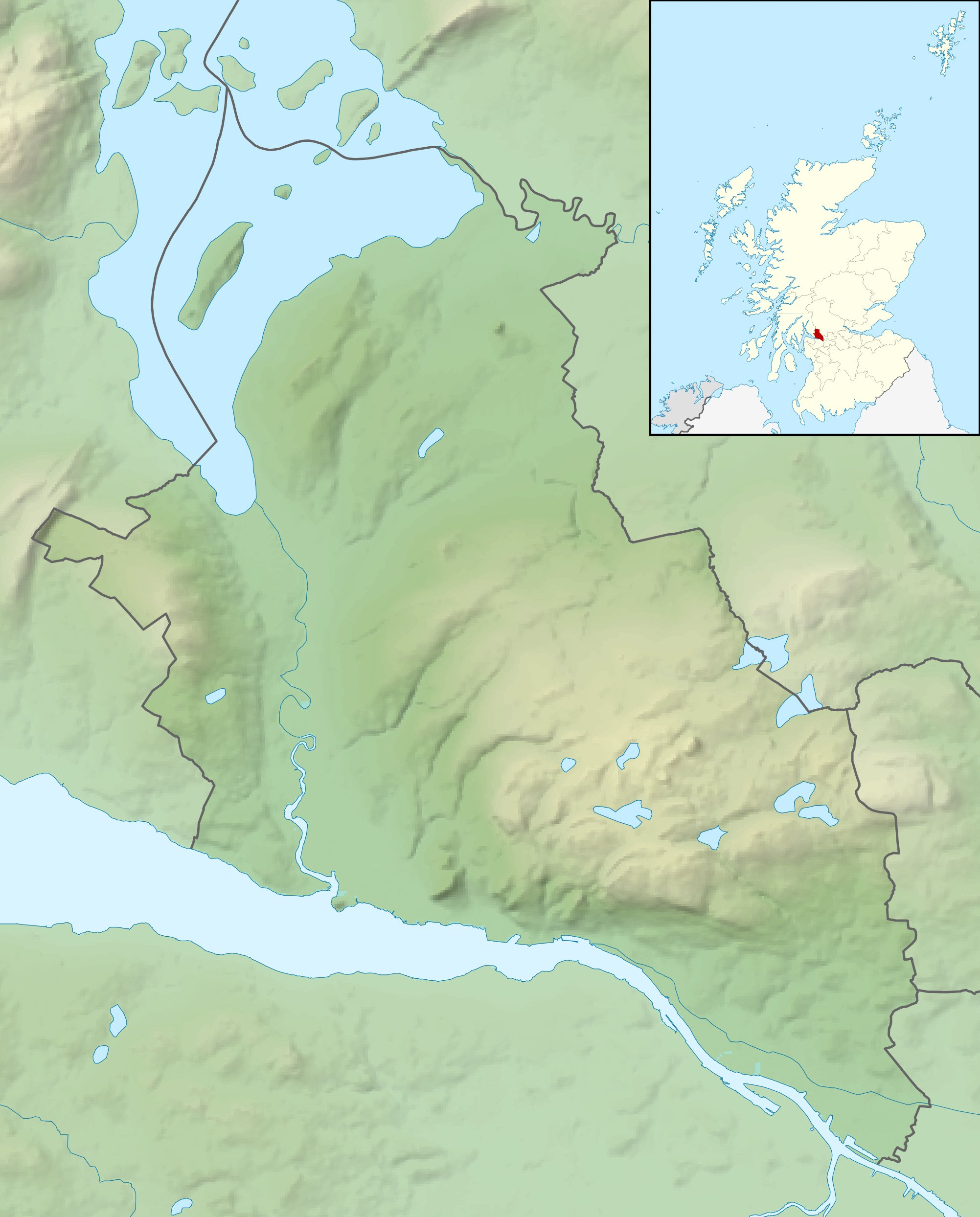
- Location within West Dunbartonshire
- Location: West Dunbartonshire, Scotland
- Coordinates: 55.9444°N 4.52354159°W
- Type: freshwater loch
- River sources: River Kirkaig
- Ocean/sea sources: Atlantic Ocean
- Basin countries: Scotland
- Max. length: 180 m (590 ft)
- Max. width: 100 m (330 ft)
- Surface area: 2.9 ha (7.2 acres)
- Shore length^{1}: 700 m (2,300 ft)
- Surface elevation: 83 m (272 ft)
- Settlements: Dumbarton
- ^{1} Shore length is not a well-defined measure.

Loch Bowie is a small freshwater loch located in West Dunbartonshire, Scotland.

== Geography ==
To the west of the Loch is the former Iron Age Hillfort of Dunbowie Dun, a volcanic plug on the edge of the Kilpatrick Hills plateau, that overlooks the loch at 158 metres (518 ft). The town of Dumbarton is directly to the west. To the south is Dumbuck Hill, which is now Dumbuckhill Quarry. To the southeast is the Chapel of Colquhoun. The mound is from a volcanic plug on the edge of the Kilpatrick Hills plateau called Chapel Knowe. In the centre of the mound there is the appearance of the foundations of a small building, and in earlier times was used as a place of sepulture. A tradition is held amongst people in Dumbarton that a chapel formerly stood on the mound that part of the walls from about 100 years ago remained. Within this century, tombstones have been excavated from the ground on the Chapel Knowe. Chapel Knowe nor Muir of Colquhoun has not been found on any plan. Closer to the east, is the former castle of Middleton Castle that later became a farm. The Lorane family were tenants of Middleton for centuries, and by 1810 the castle, which had 4-foot (1.2 m) high walls, was in ruins.

To the north along the rural road that passes the loch to the right is Overtoun House.

== Gallery ==
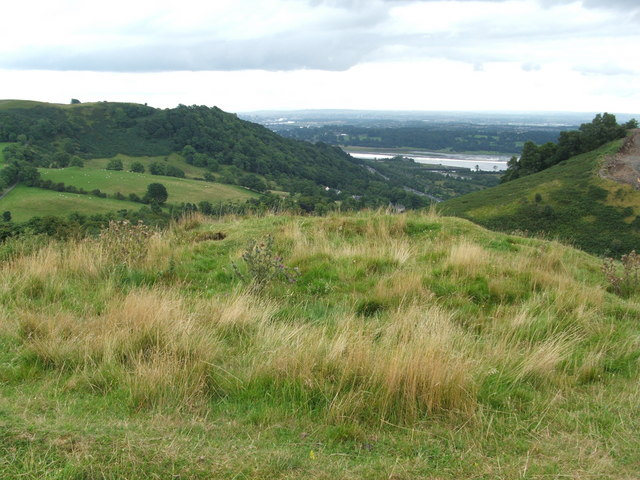
Dumbowie Hill has two summits, north-western summit and south-eastern summit

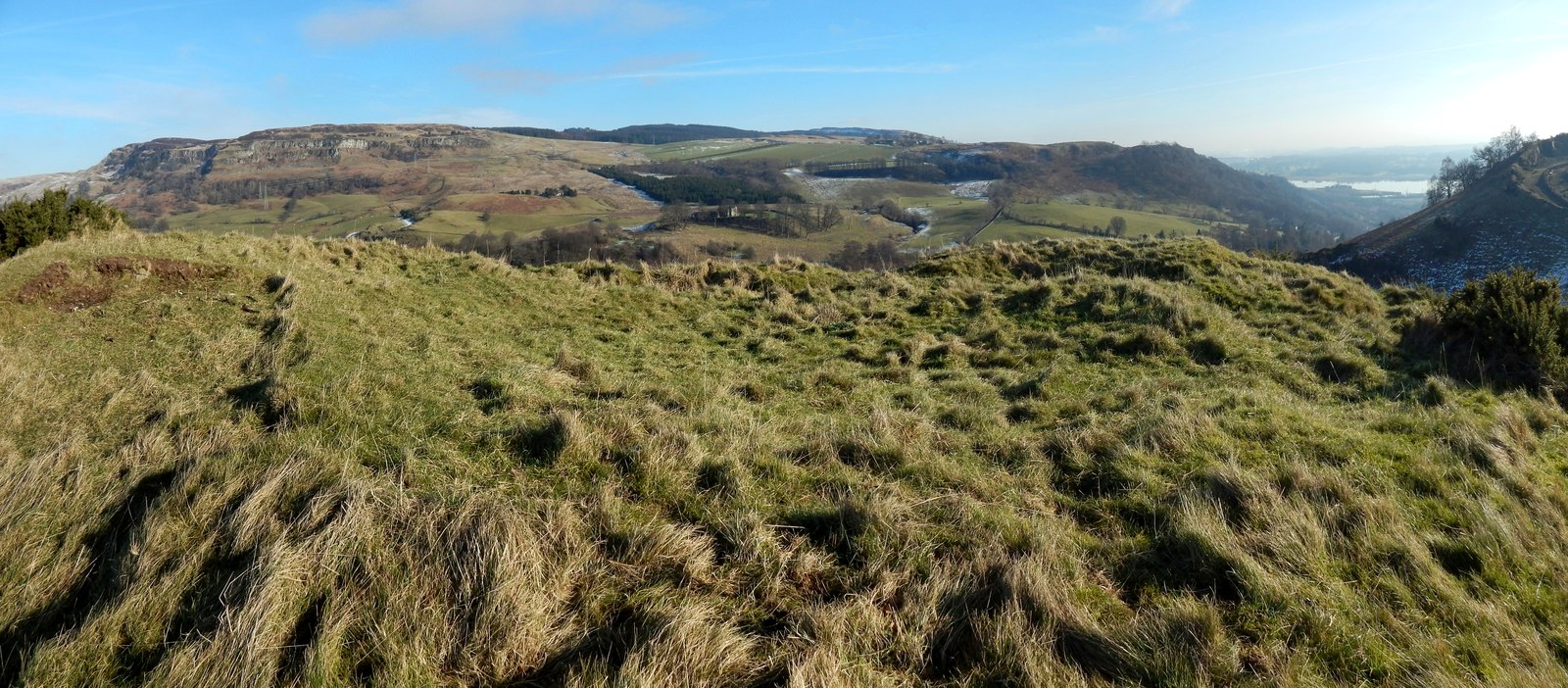
The flat area on the summit was the site of Dumbuie Dun, an Iron Age fort, the antiquity marked on the map.

== See also ==
- List of lochs in Scotland
- List of reservoirs and dams in the United Kingdom
