= Dumbarton (ward) =

Electoral ward in West Dunbartonshire, Scotland

Location of the ward

Dumbarton is one of the six wards used to elect members of the West Dunbartonshire Council. It elects four Councillors.

The ward covers most of the town of Dumbarton, including the outlying villages of Milton and Bowling on the Firth of Clyde, but excepting northern parts of Dumbarton such as Bellsmyre, Broadmeadow and Lomondgate which are assigned to the Leven ward.

== Councillors ==
Election	Councillors			
2007	Geoff Calvert (Labour)	David McBride (Labour)	Iain Robertson (SNP)	George Black (Ind.)
2012	Thomas Rainey (Labour)	David McBride (Labour)	Ian Murray (SNP)	George Black (Ind.)
2017	Brian Walker (Conservative)	David McBride (Labour)	Karen Conaghan (SNP)	Iain McLaren (SNP)
2022	Gurpreet Singh Johal (Labour)	David McBride (Labour)	Karen Conaghan (SNP)	Chris Pollock (SNP)

== Election results ==
=== 2022 election ===
2022 West Dunbartonshire Council election

Dumbarton - 4 seats
Party	Candidate	FPv%	Count					
Party	Candidate	FPv%	1	2	3	4	5	6
SNP	Karen Conoghan (incumbent)	33.8	2,171					
Labour	David McBride (incumbent)	31.8	2,045					
Labour	Gurpreet Singh Johal	14.5	950	987	1,546.5			
Conservative	Brian Walker (incumbent)	9.4	601	602.9	642.4	682.5	686.5	696.4
SNP	Chris Pollock	8.2	592	1,246.2	1,265.4	1,291.8	1,295.8	1,305.8
TUSC	Lynda McEwan	1.1	73	86.9	99.9	123.0	127.7	137.4
Scottish Libertarian	Jonathan Rainey	0.7	45	49.7	54.8	62.3	68.5	
Sovereignty	Kelly Wilson	0.5	30	30.8	32.2	34.3		
Electorate: 13,336 Valid: 6,524 Spoilt: 163 Quota: 1,305 Turnout: 50.1%

=== 2017 election ===
2017 West Dunbartonshire Council election

Dumbarton - 4 seats
Party	Candidate	FPv%	Count					
Party	Candidate	FPv%	1	2	3	4	5	6
Labour	David McBride (incumbent)	26.9	1,762					
SNP	Karen Conaghan	22.8	1,499					
Conservative	Brian Walker	14.6	957	979.7	980.5	1,009.3	1,147.1	1,388.0
SNP	Iain McLaren	12.3	809	827.1	989.8	998.6	1,254.1	1,403.0
West Dunbartonshire Community	George Black (incumbent)	12.1	792	821.0	827.1	888.3		
Labour	Elizabeth Ruine	8.9	584	910.2	915.0	937.2	1,103.6	
Independent	Andrew Muir	2.4	159	168.4	170.9			
Electorate: 13,146 Valid: 6,562 Spoilt: 168 Quota: 1,313 Turnout: 51.2%

=== 2012 election ===
2012 West Dunbartonshire Council election

Dumbarton - 4 seats
Party	Candidate	FPv%	Count						
Party	Candidate	FPv%	1	2	3	4	5	6	7
Labour	David McBride (incumbent)	30.59	1,678						
SNP	Ian Murray	18.01	988	1,015.3	1,027.1	1,039.1	1,050.8	1,071.1	1,130.4
Independent	George Black (incumbent)	13.96	766	788.1	803.4	818.6	840.2	905.1	1,146.6
Labour	Thomas Rainey	13.74	754	1,218.9					
SNP	Iain Robertson (incumbent)	10.21	560	568.6	574.9	581.2	583.7	597.1	621.3
Independent	Iain Ellis	6.60	362	368.9	377.8	380.2	418.1	465.1	
Conservative	Sally Page	4.14	227	230.5	233.6	234.7	241.2		
Independent	Andrew Muir	1.55	85	93.3	98	106.6			
Scottish Socialist	Cammy Fyfe	1.20	66	71.9	78				
Electorate: 12,620 Valid: 5,486 Quota: 1,098 Turnout: 5,600 (44.37%)

=== 2007 election ===
2007 West Dunbartonshire Council election

West Dunbartonshire Council election, 2007: Dumbarton
Party	Candidate	FPv%	%	Seat	Count
Labour	Geoff Calvert	1,292	17.7		
SNP	Iain Robertson	1,204	16.5		
Labour	David McBride	1,107	15.2		
SNP	Betty Mitchell	979	13.4		
Conservative	Martyn Anthony McIntyre	719	9.9		
Independent	George Black	696	9.6		
Green	Rose Harvie	387	5.3		
Independent	Linda McColl	351	4.8		
Independent	Alistair Tuach	304	4.2		
Scottish Socialist	Les Robertson	242	3.3		
