= Bridge of Death =

Bridge of Death may refer to:

== Bridges ==
- Van Stadens Bridge in South Africa, known for its large number of suicide jumpers
- A bridge in Nazi Germany-operated Lwów Ghetto (current Ukraine) during World War II, under which thousands of Jews were killed
- Bridge of Death (Pripyat) in Ukraine, a road bridge over a railway line, between the town of Prypiat and the Chernobyl Nuclear Power Plant, where there were unsubstantiated claims of deaths from radiation during the Chernobyl disaster
- Overtoun Bridge in Scotland, which is known for a strange phenomenon that leads to dogs jumping to their death off of it

== In arts and media ==
- Bridge of Death, a 1974 South Korean film directed by Lee Doo-yong
- A bridge over the Gorge of Eternal Peril in the 1975 film Monty Python and the Holy Grail
- "Bridge of Death", a song by the American band Manowar from their 1984 album Hail to England
- "The Bridge of Death", a song by the Norwegian band Antestor from their 1998 album The Return of the Black Death

== See also ==
- Chinvat Bridge, in Zoroastrianism, the bridge which separates the world of the living from the world of the dead
