= John Moyr Smith =

Scottish architect and artist (1839–1912)

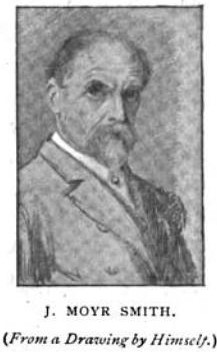
J. Moyr Smith, from a drawing by himself

John Moyr Smith (12 March 1839 – 1 December 1912) was a Scottish architect and architectural historian later noted as an artist and designer, famed for his work on ceramic tiles.

== Life ==
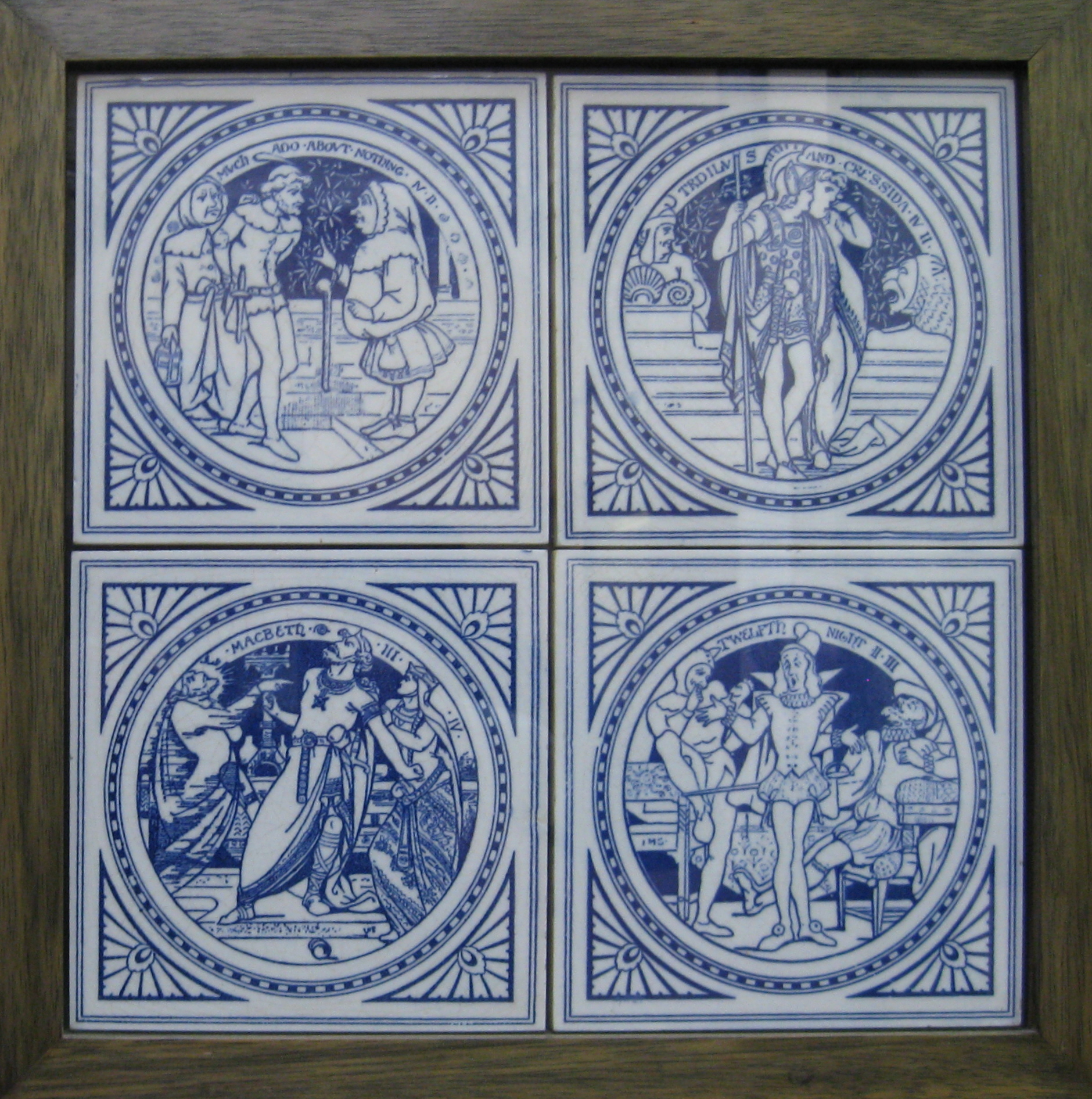
Shakespeare tiles, 1872, designed by John Moyr Smith and made by Mintons

Smith was born on 12 March 1839 at 43 John Street in Glasgow, the son of David Smith a wine and spirit merchant and his wife Margaret Moire. He was articled as an architect to James Salmon in 1855. In around 1859 he moved to the offices of James Smith and worked on the detailing of Overtoun House. From 1857 he attended Glasgow School of Art. He was president of the Glasgow Architectural Association.

Working on Overtoun, he encountered several highly skilled artists involved in its decoration: William Leiper; Bruce Talbert and Daniel Cottier.

Working with Melvin he completed the Stirling's Library project in Glasgow following Smith's death. Soon after (around 1864) he moved south to the studio of Alfred Darbyshire where he also encountered Henry Stacy Marks. In 1866 he moved to London as an assistant to George Gilbert Scott.

In 1869 he went to Paris to meet Gustave Doré.

In 1873 he designed a house for himself: Doune Lodge at 27 Oxford Road, Putney where he lived with his mother and unmarried sister, Christina. Being left alone from 1891 he moved to a smaller house in 1894: Bloomfield in Queen's Road, Richmond.

He died at Oakbank Cottage in Kilcreggan on 1 December 1912.

An example of his work is the interior of the Great Hall of the former Holloway Sanatorium, now in Virginia Park, an exclusive housing development near Virginia Water, Surrey, England.

== Publications ==
- Contributor to Fun magazine from 1866
- Studies for Pictures: A Medley (1868)
- Album of Decorative Figures (1882)
- Ancient Greek Female Costume (1882)
- Ornamental Interiors Ancient and Modern (1888)
