= James Smith (Glasgow architect) =

Scottish architect

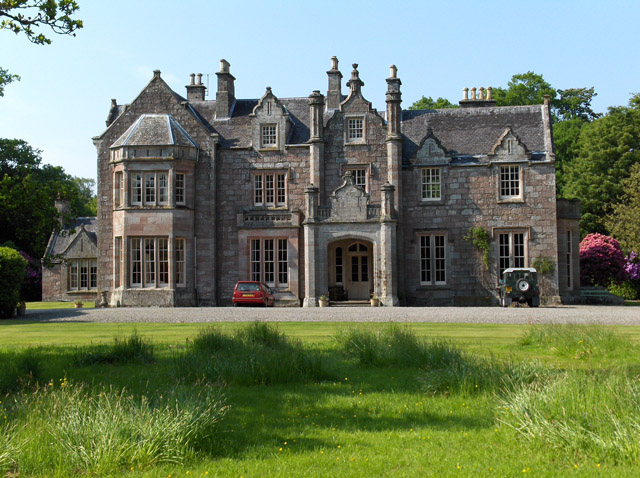
Meiklewood House

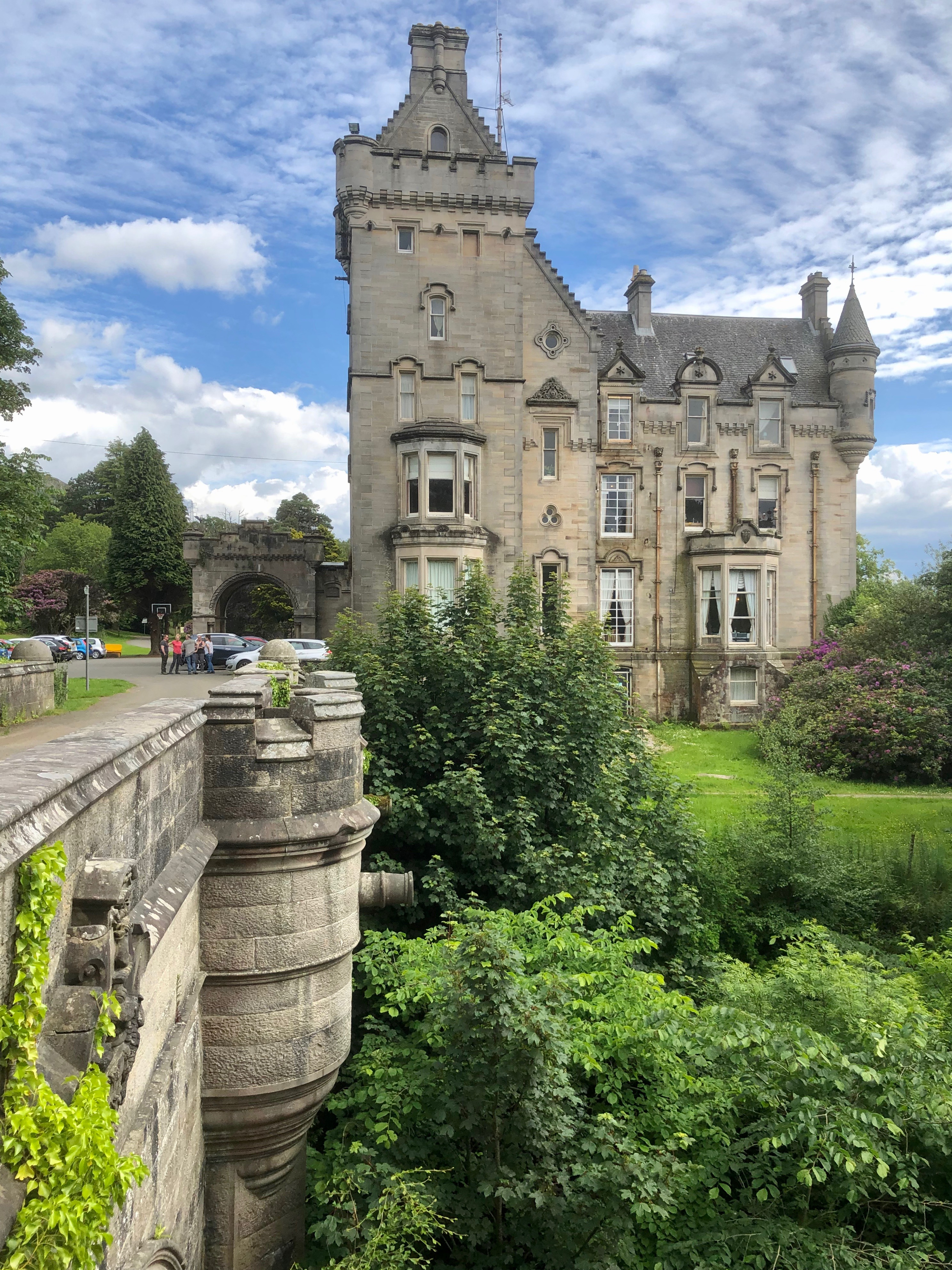
Overtoun House from the west

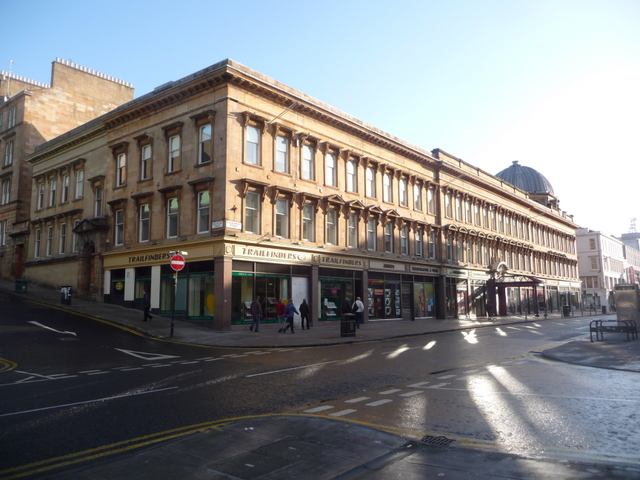
The McLellan Galleries

James Smith (1808–1863) was a 19th-century Scottish architect who specialised in very large country mansions.

== Life ==
He was born in Alloa on 12 October 1808 the son of John Smith, a builder, and his wife Betty Thompson. His father had worked with James Gillespie Graham on the rebuilding of Alloa Parish Church. In 1826 the family moved to Glasgow. In 1835 they were living at 81 Wellington Place and the father had offices at 22 Royal Exchange Square (quite a prestigious address).

From 1837 he took over from his father and began stylising himself as "architect".

In 1850 the family was living at 230 Sauchiehall Street and Smith had offices at 123 St Vincent Street. In 1854 he moved to a large country house of his own design in Rhu which he named Rowaleyn.

Following the family scandal in 1857 he was forced to leave his Glasgow home and sell Rowaleyn and went to live in the quiet suburb of Bridge of Allan near Stirling. In 1860 he moved again, this time to Old Polmont near Falkirk. Here he lived in the large villa known as Polmont Bank.

He died in Polmont on 30 December 1863 aged 55.

Architect (and later artist) John Moyr Smith trained in his office 1860 to 1863.

== Family ==
In March 1833 he married Janet Hamilton, daughter of David Hamilton (architect).

Their children included Madeleine Smith of Blythswood Square, acquitted of poisoning her lover in 1857; and also Bessie, Janet and John Hamilton Smith. Madeleine married and died in New York aged 93.

== Artworks ==
Smith had an extensive collection of artworks including two by Alexander Nasmyth: "Waterfall" and "View of Edinburgh". He had 30 works by other artists and 21 chromo-lithographs. These were auctioned in Glasgow following his death.

== Known works ==
- Royal Exchange Square, Glasgow (1830) with David Hamilton
- Meiklewood House in Gargunnock (1832)
- Victoria Public Baths, Glasgow (1837)
- Collegiate School, Garnethill (1840)
- Pedestal for equestrian statue of Victoria by Carlo Marochetti, George Square, Glasgow (1840)
- Dhuhill Helensburgh (1850)
- Tenements in Cranstonhill, Glasgow (1853)
- Ardchapel in Shandon, Dunbartonshire (1854)
- Rowaleyn in Rhu (1854)
- McLellan Galleries (1855)
- Overtoun House (1859)
- Bellahouston Established Church (1863)
- Alloa manse (1863) completed after death
- Stirling's Library, Glasgow (1863) completed by John Moyr Smith
