= Overtoun Bridge =

Category B-listed bridge over the Overtoun Burn

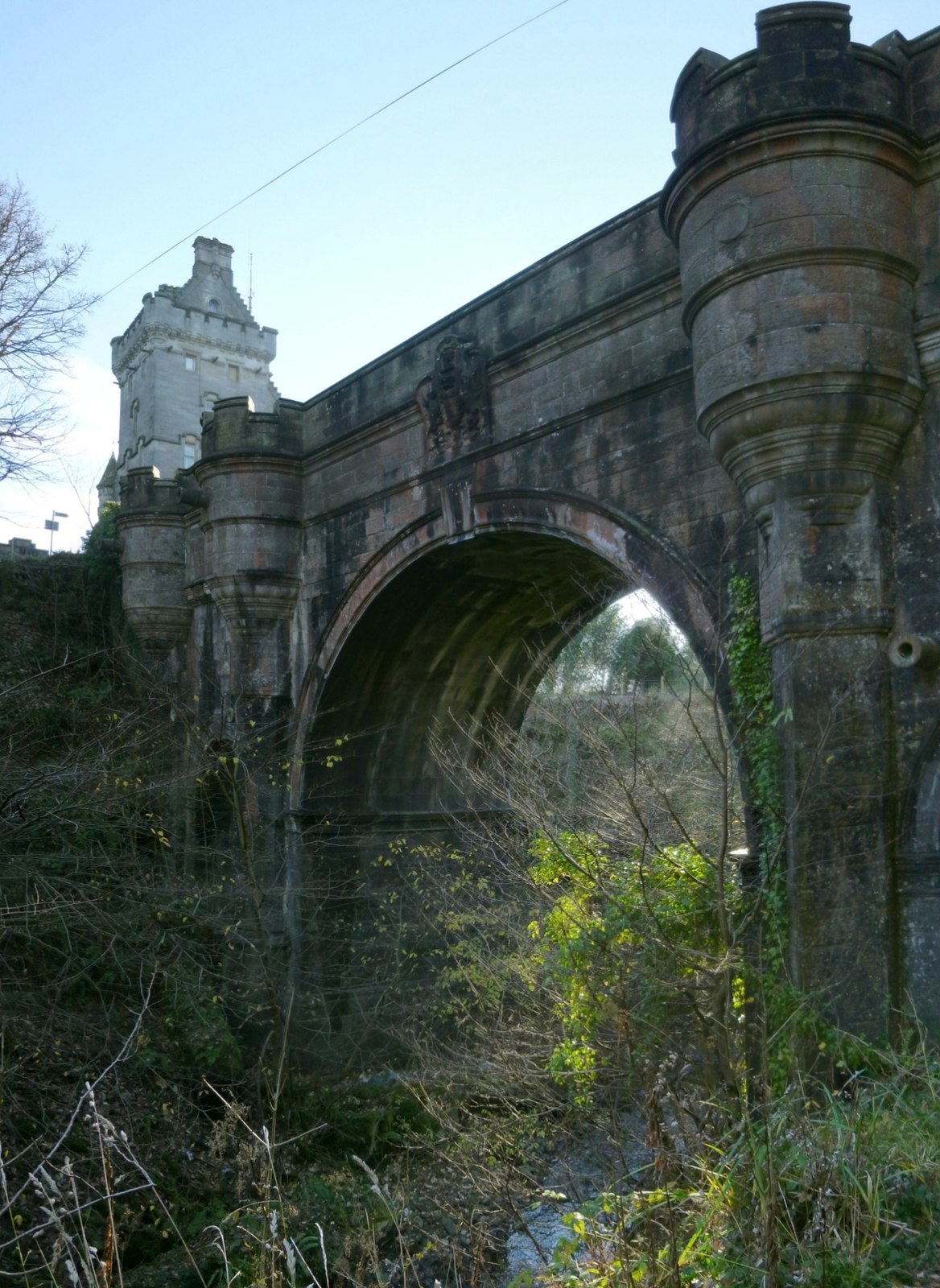
- The bridge spans a deep ravine called Spardie Linn.
- Coordinates: 55.95265°N 4.52522°W
- OS grid reference: NS 42428 76171
- Crosses: Overtoun Burn
- Locale: West Dunbartonshire
- Other name: Dog Suicide Bridge
- Named for: Overtoun House

Characteristics
- Design: Arch
- Material: Ashlar
- No. of spans: 3

History
- Designer: Henry Ernest Milner
- Construction end: June 1895

Listed Building – Category B
- Official name: Overtoun House, Bridge At Garshake Drive Over Overtoun Burn
- Designated: 31 January 1984
- Reference no.: LB24908

Location
- Interactive map of Overtoun Bridge

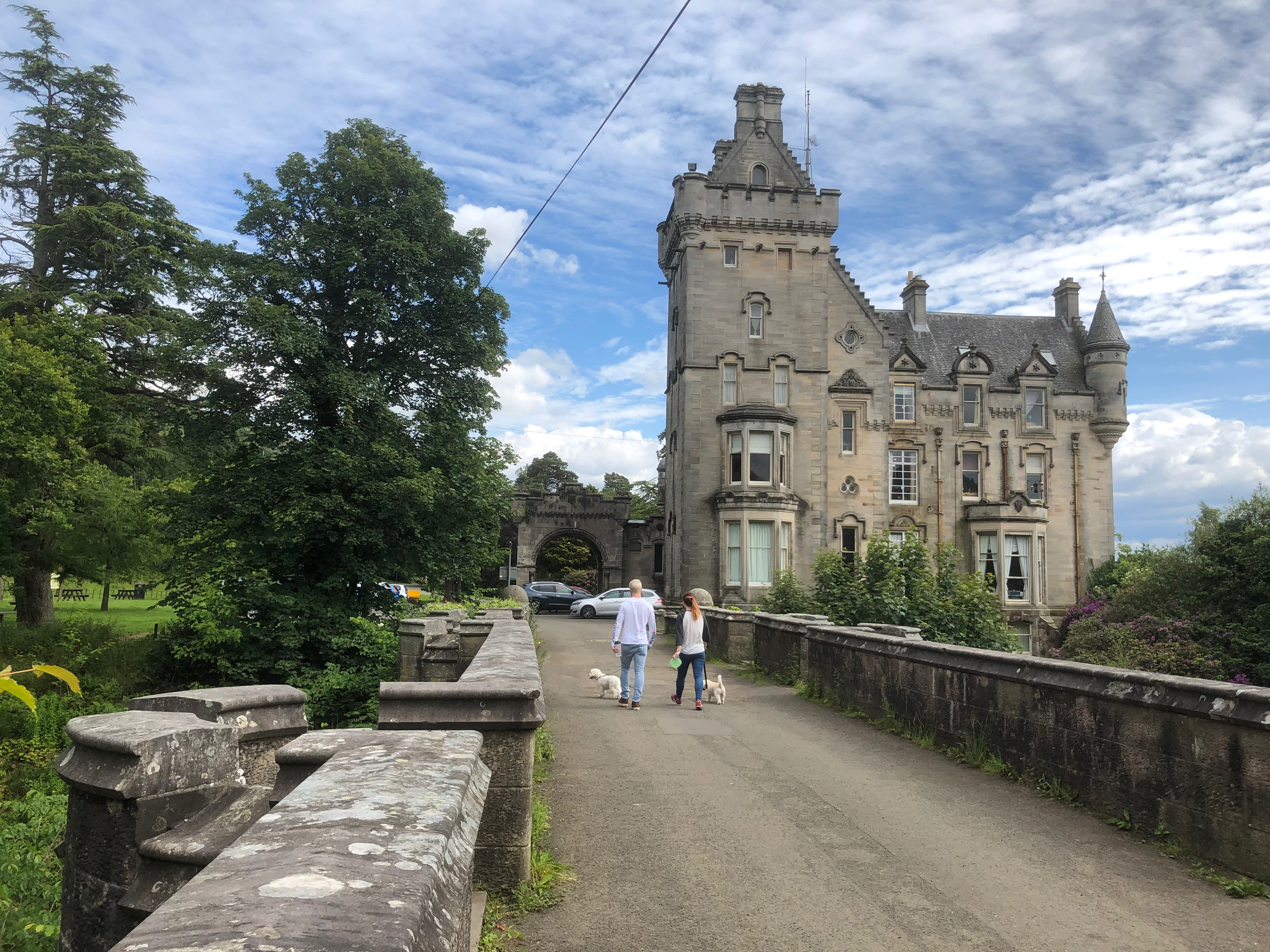
Overtoun Bridge, on the approach to Overtoun House

Overtoun Bridge is a category B-listed structure over the Overtoun Burn on the approach road from the west to Overtoun House, near Dumbarton in West Dunbartonshire, Scotland. It was completed in 1895, based on a design by the landscape architect H. E. Milner. It spans a ditch known as Spardie Linn.

Since the 1950s, numerous accounts of dogs either falling or jumping from the bridge have been reported. With the incidents often resulting in serious injury or death upon landing on the rocks some 50 ft (15 m) below, the bridge has been dubbed the "Dog Suicide Bridge". Various explanations for these deaths have been proposed, ranging from natural accidents to paranormal activity.

== History and construction ==
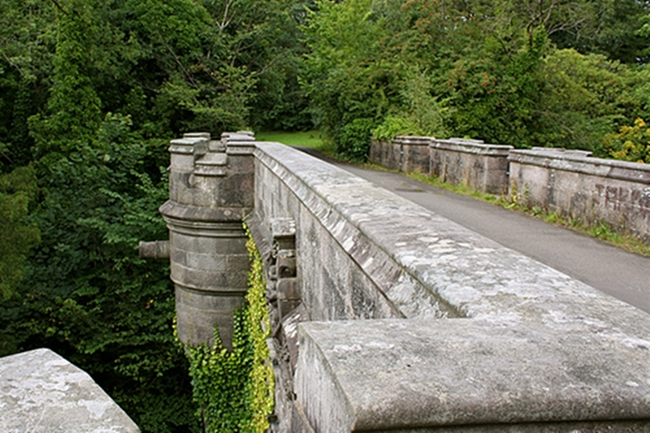
Bridge with decorative bartizans

In 1859, the Overtoun Farm was acquired by Scottish industrialist James White, who had just started in the business of chemical manufacturing. He built the Overtoun House three years later in 1862. When White died in 1884, his son, John Campbell White, inherited the house and its estate and started planning to extend the driveway of the house across a deep ravine in order to provide easier access. He hired landscape architect and civil engineer Henry Milner to design a bridge.

The bridge, which is constructed from rough-faced ashlar, was completed in June 1895. It comprises three arches that span a steep sided ravine. A large central arch spans the Overtoun Burn with two lower and smaller arches flanking both sides.

== Unexplained dog behaviour ==
Since the 1950s, locals have referred to the bridge as the "Bridge of Death" or the "Dog Suicide Bridge", as it was reported that dogs were leaping from the bridge into the ravine below. Research has found at least 300 dogs have been recorded jumping from the bridge, with at least 50 dogs dying from the fall.

The phenomenon became more well known during the 2000s and early 2010s when incidents began being reported online and in the media. For example, in 2004, Kenneth Meikle was walking with his family and Golden Retriever, when the dog suddenly bolted and jumped off the bridge. It survived, but was traumatized by the experience. In 2005, at least five other dogs also jumped from the bridge in the course of six months. In 2014, Alice Trevorrow, who was walking with her Springer Spaniel named Cassie, reported a strange experience on Overtoun Bridge. "I had parked up and as she is so obedient I didn't put her lead on... Me and my son walked toward Cassie, who was staring at something above the bridge... she definitely saw something that made her jump. There is something sinister going on. It was so out-of-character for her."

In 2019 the owners of Overtoun House, who had lived there for 17 years, said they had witnessed a number of agitated dogs fall from the bridge; they believed that the scent of mink, pine martens, and other animals lured the dogs to leap over the bridge parapet: "The dogs catch the scent of mink, pine martens or some other mammal and then they will jump up on the wall of the bridge. And because it's tapered, they will just topple over." But an owner, who was originally a pastor from Texas, also believed the grounds possessed some sort of spiritual quality. This is echoed by some local people who believe animals are sensitive to the paranormal.

A number of rational theories have been proposed as to what is affecting the behaviour of dogs on the bridge. In 2014, canine psychologist David Sands proposed that the surrounding foliage – giving the in-reality extremely steep drop off the side of the bridge the appearance of even ground – combined with the residual odour from male mink urine in the area could be culprit for luring dogs to jump off the bridge. However, John Joyce, a local hunter and resident of 50 years, rejected this theory stating that there were "no mink [in the area]". In a separate investigation by the Royal Society for the Protection of Birds, it was found that the side of the bridge reportedly favoured by leaping dogs did contain evidence of "nests of mice, squirrels, and minks". In a separate experiment, seven out of ten dogs exposed to canisters filled with the scent of mouse, squirrel and mink, "all went straight for the mink scent, many of them quite dramatically."

The Scottish Society for the Prevention of Cruelty to Animals has investigated the bridge and surrounding area, but their findings proved inconclusive.

== Human incidents ==
In October 1994, a paranoid schizophrenic father threw his two-week-old son to his death from the bridge because he believed his son was an incarnation of the Devil. He attempted suicide but was caught and placed in a mental health hospital. He said he chose the location due to its association with dark spirits and ancient Druids.

== In film and television ==
In October 2022, Heel Films used Overtoun House, the bridge and the alleged paranormal activities as a basis for their 2023 short film "The Bridge" written and directed by Scott McMillan; the film stars Christopher Wallace and Susan Sims.

== See also ==
- List of bridges in Scotland
