= William James Chrystal =

Scottish chemist (1854-1921)

William James Chrystal (20 May 1854 – 21 April 1921) was a Scottish chemist and partner in his family’s chemicals business J & J White Chemicals based in Rutherglen.

== Ancestors ==
Chrystal was born in Glasgow, son of insurance broker Robert Chrystal and grandson of Dr. William Chrystal (1776–1830), rector of Glasgow Grammar School who died in a boating accident and is remembered with a bust at the school's current campus (originally sited at Glasgow Cathedral). His mother Jean was the daughter of John White, founder of J & J White Chemicals, and her brothers John and James were also partners from 1840 and 1851 respectively until their deaths in the 1880s.

== Education and career ==
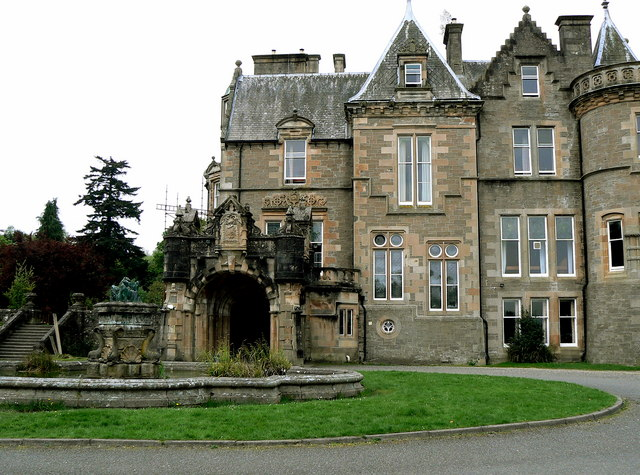
Auchendennan House in 2007

Chrystal was educated at The Glasgow Academy and the University of Glasgow. He was a fellow of the Royal Institute of Chemistry and the Chemical Society. After working in a laboratory in the 1870s he joined J & J White Chemicals as an expert chemist, and after his uncle John died in 1881 he became the technical partner in the business. By this time Chrystal’s cousin John Campbell White, the son of his other uncle James, was also a partner. After the death of James White in 1884 another cousin, Hill Hamilton Barrett, became the commercial partner. At this time the Shawfield works, mainly producing bichromate of potash, were the largest of their kind in the world and employed over 500 men. Chrystal was credited with improving the manufacturing processes for the products.

== Personal interests ==
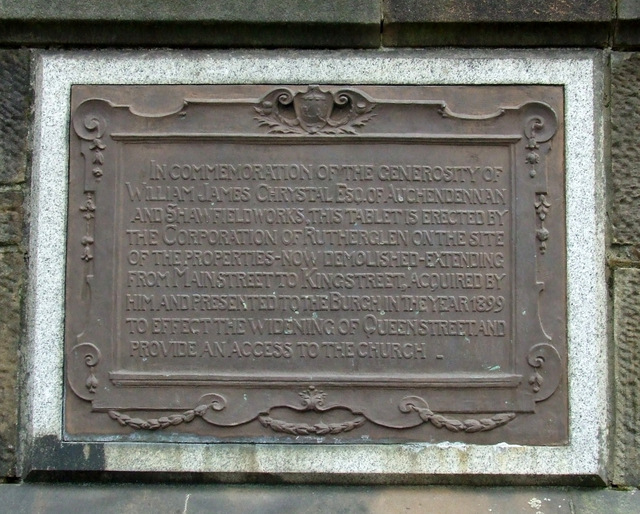
Plaque in Rutherglen commending Chrystal's contributions relating to the town's church

In 1898 he bought and reconstructed Auchendennan House (Arden, Argyll) on Loch Lomond. The building was later owned for some years by the Scottish Youth Hostels Association. In 1899 he purchased buildings in central Rutherglen to allow them to be demolished to aid the building of a new church – this is commemorated on a plaque outside the present Rutherglen Old Parish Church on Main Street.

Chrystal was a member of Glasgow Philosophical Society, and was a keen yachter and a member of the Royal Clyde Yacht Club.

His son Ian (Seaforth Highlanders) was killed in the First World War.

He died at Auchendennan was buried at the family tomb in Glasgow Necropolis.
