= James White (1812–1884) =

Scottish lawyer, businessman and chemicals manufacturer

Coordinates: 55.862783°N 4.236484°W

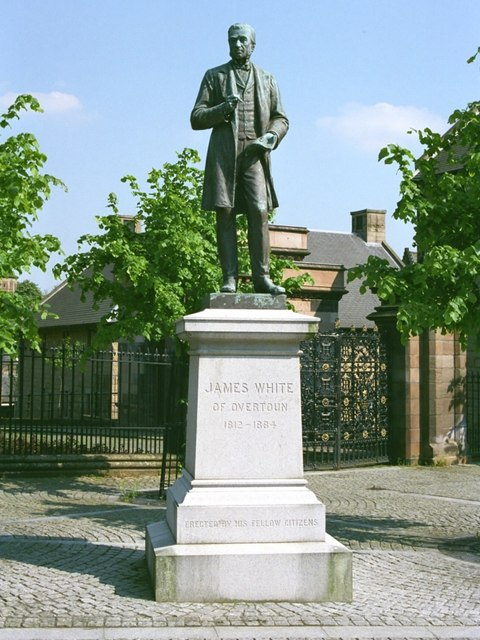
Statue of James White in Cathedral Square, Glasgow

James White (1812–1884) was a Scottish lawyer, businessman and chemicals manufacturer. In 1890 he was honoured posthumously with a statue in Glasgow’s Cathedral Square, designed by John Mossman (although he died before its completion) and sculpted by Frank Leslie. It has been designated a Category 'B' listed building by Historic Scotland.

== Early life ==
White was born in 1812 at Shawfield House in Rutherglen which at that time was a rural country estate on the banks of the River Clyde. However in 1820 his father John and his uncle James had established a chemicals enterprise (J & J White Chemicals) in the area, and in the subsequent decades the business expanded to become dominant in the industry with its facilities spread over the whole of the Shawfield district. As a result, Shawfield is one of the most dangerously contaminated sites in the UK, with carcinogenic hexavalent chromium deposited in the ground.

White was educated at Glasgow Grammar School and Glasgow University and thereafter became a lawyer and a partner in Couper & White solicitors, a position which he held for 17 years. In 1836 he married Fanny Campbell (sister of businessman Robert Orr Campbell), settling initially at Hayfield House within the Shawfield estate, and they produced seven children - six daughters and one son, John Campbell White.

== Chemicals partner ==
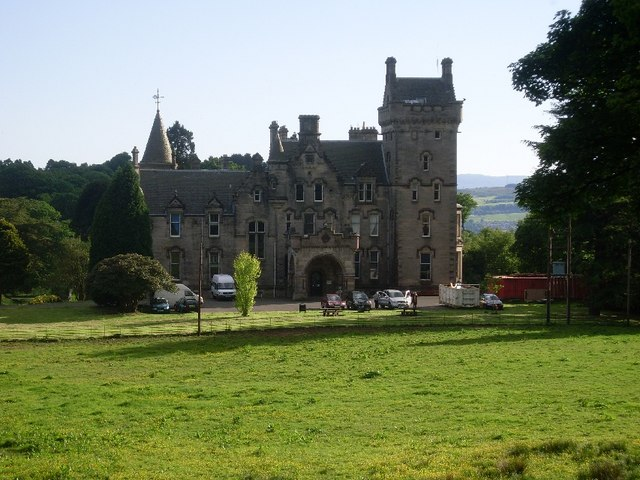
Overtoun House, Dumbarton

At the invitation of his father and older brother (another John White, who had joined the business in 1833), James White became a partner in the family firm in 1851, focusing on the commercial aspect whilst his brother and father (who died in 1860) were more concerned with the manufacturing.

Now wealthy from the success of the chemicals business, in 1859 White purchased land near Dumbarton which was his wife's hometown and far from the polluted atmosphere of the Shawfield works. Their grand mansion Overtoun House was built in 1862. His brother John purchased the even more distant Arddarroch House at Loch Long.

His son John became a partner in 1867, and after the death of his brother John in 1881 they were joined by his nephew (son of his sister Jean), the expert chemist William Chrystal. At this time their works employed 500 in Rutherglen and had an output similar to all other such businesses in Britain combined.

== Other interests ==
Apart from his Shawfield business interests, White was also deputy chairman of the Glasgow and South Western Railway (although the railway lines which served the Shawfield works were operated by the Clydesdale Junction Railway/Caledonian Railway), was a director of the Merchants' House of Glasgow, financed the construction of the elaborate Christian Institute building in the city's Bothwell Street, and at various times was chairman of the Glasgow Royal Exchange, the Glasgow Chamber of Commerce and the National Bible Society of Scotland. He was a member of the Free Church of Scotland and a Liberal in politics.

Upon his death in 1884 aged 72 at Overtoun House, the Lord Provost of Glasgow remarked that White was "a gentleman who has long occupied a foremost place among the citizens of Glasgow".
