= John White, 1st Baron Overtoun =

Scottish chemical manufacturer and philanthropist

John Campbell White
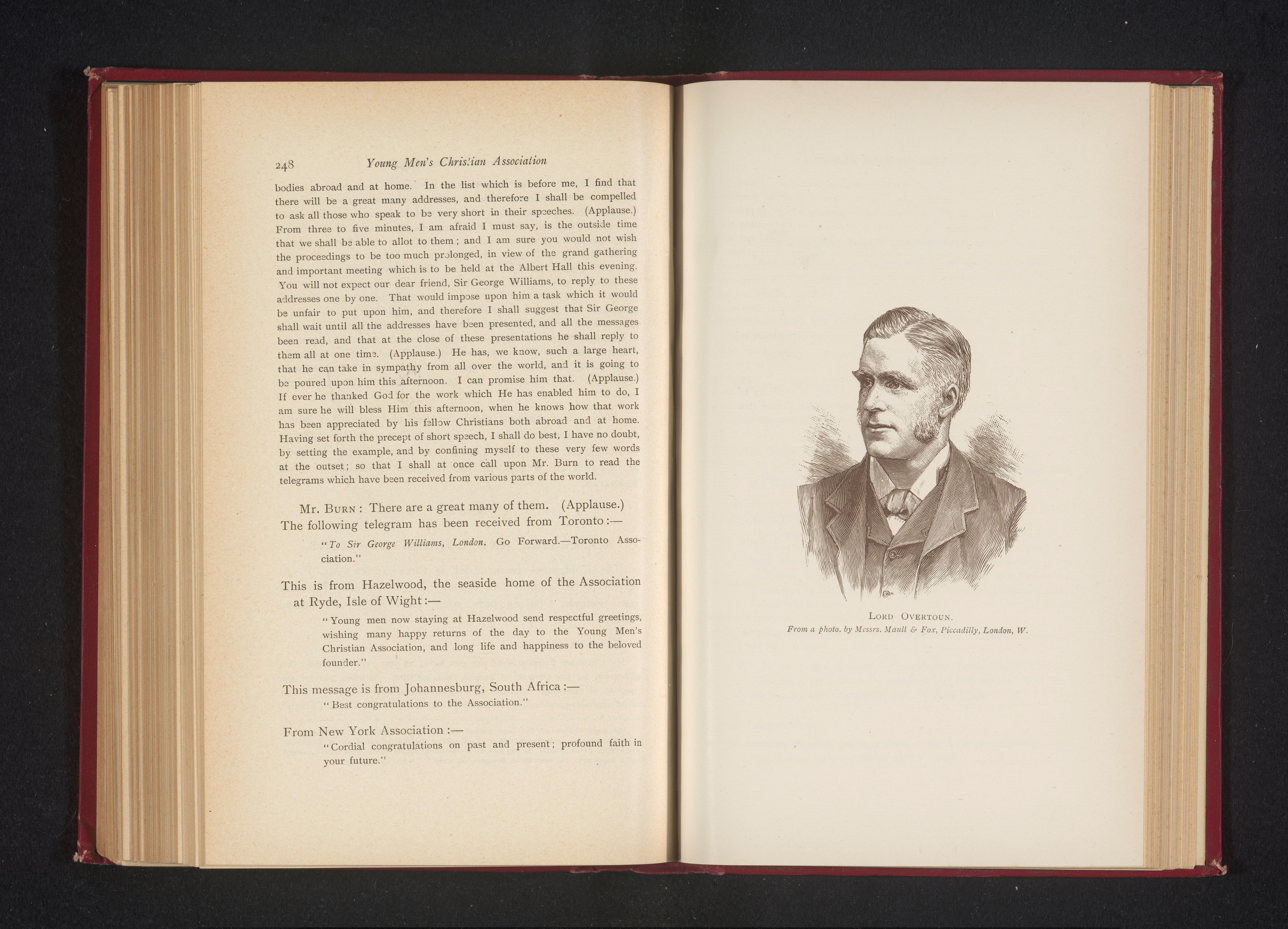
- Born: 21 November 1843; Rutherglen, Scotland
- Died: 15 February 1908 (aged 64); Overtoun House, Scotland
- Education: University of Glasgow
- Occupations: chemical manufacturer philanthropist politician
- Spouse: Grace Eliza McClure
- Father: James White

John Campbell White, 1st Baron Overtoun, DL, JP (21 November 1843 – 15 February 1908) was a Scottish chemical manufacturer, supporter of religious causes, philanthropist and Liberal politician. He was raised to the peerage by Gladstone in 1893, and in 1905 was granted the Freedom of the City of Rutherglen (where his chemical works was based), following being honoured in the same fashion by Dumbarton two years earlier, in recognition of his philanthropic endeavours.

White's persona as a generous and committed Scottish Presbyterian was at odds with his exploitation of the workers at his Shawfield Chemical Works, the source of his great wealth. Politician and leader of the nascent Labour Party, Keir Hardie, exposed the scandalous working conditions there in a series of pamphlets published in 1899 entitled White Slaves.

== Background and education ==
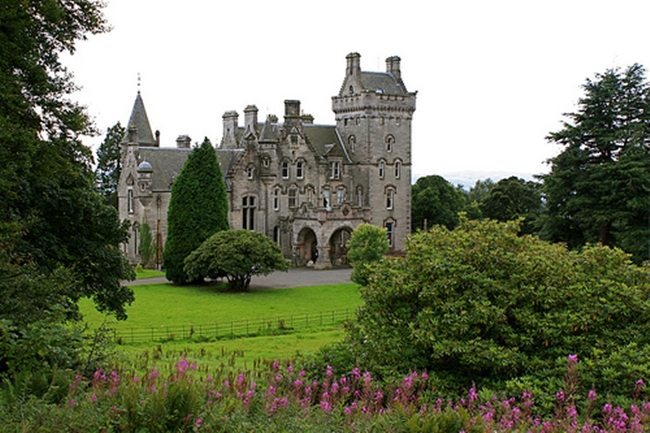
Overtoun House, the seat of Lord Overtoun

Lord Overtoun's father, James White of Overtoun (1812–1884) was originally a lawyer, who had left the legal profession to join John & James White, chemical manufacturers, a firm founded by his father and uncle at Rutherglen in 1810. He was chief administrator of the fund set up for the sufferers of the City of Glasgow Bank collapse in 1878. After his death, citizens of Glasgow erected a statue of him at Cathedral Square, Glasgow.

John White was born at Hayfield, near Rutherglen, Lanarkshire, the only son of James White by Fanny Campbell, daughter of Alexander Campbell, Sheriff of Renfrewshire, of Barnhill, Dunbartonshire. He had six sisters. He was educated at Stow's Academy, Glasgow, and at the University of Glasgow. He won prizes in logic and natural philosophy. He came into close contact with William Thomson, the future Lord Kelvin, and worked in his laboratory for a year.

== Business life ==
White graduated in 1864, and worked for a year for his uncle's company, Mackenzie & Aitken, accountants, and then for a year and a half for Leisler, Bock & Co, continental merchants. He then joined his father's business, of which he became a partner in 1867. After his father's death in 1887 White and his cousin William Chrystal became sole partners in the Shawfield Chemical Works, which was the largest of its kind in the world, employing about 500 men in 1909. The main product was potassium dichromate, known then as bichromate of potash. His nephew H. H. Barrett was later admitted a partner.

Lionel Alexander Ritchie, writing in the Oxford Dictionary of National Biography, remarks that "He [Baron Overtoun] would be remembered solely for his peerless philanthropy and Christian zeal were it not for the fact that the source of his wealth was a chemical works where the wages and working conditions were scandalous." White led the Sunday Rest and Lord's Day Observance Society, but nevertheless insisted that his employees work seven days a week, and docked his workers' wages if they took time off to go to church. The millions he donated to various charitable causes came at least in part from paying his workers some of the lowest wages in the country.

=== Public scandal ===
The Labour politician Keir Hardie took an interest in the working conditions of labourers in the chemical industry, and in 1899 exposed conditions at White's works in a series of pamphlets entitled White Slaves, published in The Labour Leader and distributed in their thousands. Safety regulations introduced in 1893 were largely ignored, and workers were forced to operate in unventilated areas without effective protective equipment. So dangerous was the toxic dust to which they were exposed that they were known locally as "White's Dead Men".

In response to the various claims about working conditions Thomas Legge, the first Medical Inspector of Factories, visited White's chemical works and others. His report published in 1900 concluded that 83 per cent of workers in chrome factories suffered from a perforated or ulcerated septum, and 22 per cent from unhealed chrome holes, deep ulcerations of the skin, sometimes even penetrating as deep as the bone. The public scandal facing White, along with an increasingly active trade union movement, forced White in 1901 to start the construction of new buildings for baths, lavatories, dining and cloakroom facilities.

== Religious affairs ==
White was a supporter of the Free Church of Scotland, and donated a mission hall in Dumbarton. He was greatly involved in the union with the United Presbyterian Church of Scotland in 1900 which led to the formation of the United Free Church of Scotland. In 1874 he became strongly influenced by the evangelical preachings of D. L. Moody. After Moody's departure from Great Britain the Glasgow United Evangelistic Association was set up, of which White became president. He was one of the leading powers behind the construction of the Association's building in Bothwell Street, Glasgow, at a cost of more than £100,000. The building housed the Bible Training Institute, the Young Men's Christian Association and Young Men's Christian Club. He also led bible classes at Dumbarton and preached throughout Great Britain.

== Politics ==
White was a Liberal in politics and served as Chairman of the Dunbartonshire Liberal Association and as a vice-president of the Scottish Liberal Association. When the Liberal Party split over Irish Home Rule in 1886, he followed William Ewart Gladstone. He declined to stand as the Liberal candidate for Dunbartonshire in 1889 but took an active part in supporting John Sinclair's candidature in the 1892 general election, in which 50 years of Conservative domination in the constituency was broken. In 1893, on the recommendation of Gladstone, he was raised to the peerage as Baron Overtoun, of Overtoun in the County of Dumbarton. In 1906 his nephew James Dundas White was returned for Dunbartonshire. In 1907 Lord Overtoun was appointed Lord-Lieutenant of Dunbartonshire, a post he held until his death the following year. He was also a Deputy Lieutenant for Dunbartonshire and a Justice of the Peace for Dunbartonshire and Lanarkshire.

In addition to his nephew, Lord Overtoun was also connected to the intelligence agent and 1950s MP for Rutherglen, Richard Brooman-White, although not a blood relative: the 'White' suffix of the surname was added by Boorman's grandfather (also Richard) upon inheriting the country estate at Arddarroch, Loch Long (today part of the Finnart Oil Terminal facilities) from his stepfather - John White (1810–1881), Lord Overtoun's uncle.

== Personal life and legacy ==
Lord Overtoun married Grace Eliza McClure, daughter of James H. McClure, a Glasgow solicitor, in 1867. They had no children. He died at Overtoun House after a short illness in February 1908, aged 65, leaving an estate of £689,022 (equivalent to £71.7 million in 2025 (Note: UK Consumer Price Index inflation figures from 1209–2024 based on data from "Inflation calculator", Bank of England, London, 18 February 2026)). The barony died with him.

Other than a donation to build a public park which still bears his name, his legacy to the people of Rutherglen and Cambuslang was the huge amount of toxic waste that his chemical works dumped on their doorsteps for more than one hundred years. In 1906 he gifted £5,000 required to purchase land in Dalmuir to create a public park in his name – this is nowadays referred to simply as Dalmuir Park.

Honorary titles
Preceded by Sir James Colquhoun, Bt	Lord-Lieutenant of Dunbartonshire; 1907–1908	Succeeded by The Lord Inverclyde
Peerage of the United Kingdom
New creation	Baron Overtoun; 1893–1908	Extinct
