= Leven (ward) =

Electoral ward in West Dunbartonshire, Scotland

Location of the ward

Leven is one of the six wards used to elect members of the West Dunbartonshire Council. It elects four Councillors.

The ward covers the southern parts of the Vale of Leven including Alexandria, Bonhill, Dalmonach and Renton, plus northern parts of Dumbarton: streets north/west of Townend Road including the modern Lomondgate development and Broadmeadow Industrial Estate, and the entire Bellsmyre area.

== Councillors ==
Election	Councillors			
2007	Jim Bollan (Socialist /WDCP)	John Millar (Labour)	Jonathan McColl (SNP)	May Smillie (SNP)
2012	Jim Bollan (Socialist /WDCP)	John Millar (Labour)	Gail Robertson (SNP)	Michelle Stewart (Labour)
2017	Jim Bollan (Socialist /WDCP)	John Millar (Labour)	Ian Dickson (SNP)	Caroline McAllister (SNP/ Alba)
2021	Jim Bollan (Socialist /WDCP)	John Millar (Labour)	Ian Dickson (SNP)	Caroline McAllister (SNP/ Alba)
2022	Jim Bollan (Socialist /WDCP)	John Millar (Labour)	Ian Dickson (SNP)	Michelle McGinty (Labour)

== Election results ==
=== 2022 election ===
2022 West Dunbartonshire Council election

Leven - 4 seats
Party	Candidate	FPv%	Count						
Party	Candidate	FPv%	1	2	3	4	5	6	7
SNP	Ian Dickson (incumbent)	25.7	1,494						
Labour	John Millar (incumbent)	18.7	1,089	1,095.2	1,101.2	1,116.8	1,184.3		
Labour	Michelle McGinty	16.4	956	963.3	966.3	997.8	1,116.8	1,130.7	1,280.3
West Dunbartonshire Community	Jim Bollan (incumbent)	16.4	953	972.2	988.4	1,047.1	1,136.1	1,138.2	1,500.6
SNP	Ronnie McColl	11.2	653	913.3	917.3	1,007.6	1,017.3	1,017.9	
Conservative	Matthew Dillon	7.2	420	421.1	432.1	439.3			
Green	Paula Baker	3.5	206	226.5	231.7				
Independent	Sian Wilkie	0.9	51	51.7					
Electorate: 13,820 Valid: 5,822 Spoilt: 129 Quota: 1,165 Turnout: 43.1%

=== 2017 election ===
2017 West Dunbartonshire Council election

Leven - 4 seats
Party	Candidate	FPv%	Count						
Party	Candidate	FPv%	1	2	3	4	5	6	7
SNP	Ian Dickson	23.0	1,353						
West Dunbartonshire Community	Jim Bollan (incumbent)	21.9	1,291						
Labour	John Millar (incumbent)	16.1	946	948.6	967.5	978.5	1,000.6	1,175.4	1,942.6
Labour	Michelle McGinty (incumbent)†	12.5	739	742.6	758.8	771.6	808.6	933.9	
SNP	Caroline McAllister	11.4	673	825.0	850.9	903.1	927.0	942.9	972.5
Conservative	Peter Parlane	11.1	655	655.5	663.1	669.7	704.0		
Liberal Democrats	George Drummond	2.3	133	135.2	143.9	153.3			
Green	Sean Quinn	1.7	103	108.3	120.7				
Electorate: 13,832 Valid: 5,893 Spoilt: 155 Quota: 1,179 Turnout: 43.7%

=== 2012 election ===
2012 West Dunbartonshire Council election

Leven - 4 seats
Party	Candidate	FPv%	Count						
Party	Candidate	FPv%	1	2	3	4	5	6	7
Labour	John Millar (incumbent)	31.8	1,622						
Scottish Socialist	Jim Bollan (incumbent)	21.0	1,073						
SNP	Gail Robertson	20.3	1,036						
Labour	Michelle Stewart	8.1	412	868.5	879.3	879.7	912.4	1,011.1	1,128.9
SNP	May Smillie (incumbent)	7.7	392	417.6	425.9	439.4	473.9	549.4	
Independent	Archie Thomson	6.4	329	359.4	371.6	371.9	459.8		
Conservative	David Jardine	4.6	237	244.8	247.9	248.1			
Electorate: 13,186 Valid: 5,101 Spoilt: 99 Quota: 1,021 Turnout: 5,200 (39.44%)

=== 2007 election ===
2007 West Dunbartonshire Council election

West Dunbartonshire Council election, 2007: Leven
Party	Candidate	FPv%	%	Seat	Count
SNP	Jonathan McColl	1,680	24.2		
Labour	John Millar	1,542	22.2		
Scottish Socialist	Jim Bollan	1,469	21.1		
SNP	May Smillie	662	9.5		
Conservative	Ian McDonald	518	7.4		
Labour	Martin Neill	505	7.3		
Independent	Alan Gadsby-Turner	332	4.8		
Green	Carola Boehm	248	3.6		
