= Milton, West Dunbartonshire =

Coordinates: 55.936°N 4.519°W

Milton
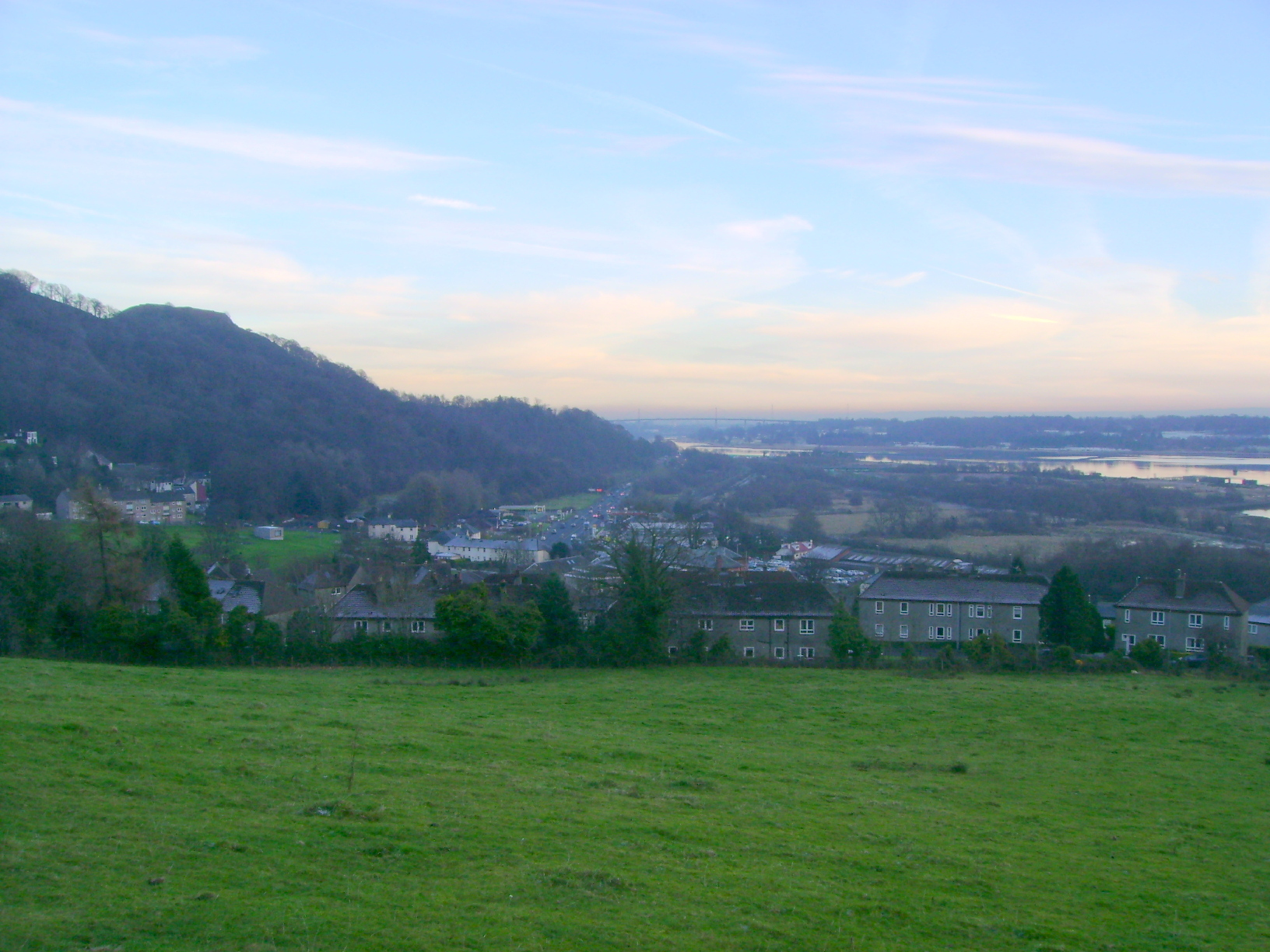
- Milton from Dumbuck Hill

- Location within West Dunbartonshire
- Population: 550 (2020)
- OS grid reference: NS426743
- Council area: West Dunbartonshire
- Lieutenancy area: Dunbartonshire
- Country: Scotland
- Sovereign state: United Kingdom
- Post town: DUMBARTON
- Postcode district: G82
- Dialling code: 01389
- Police: Scotland
- Fire: Scottish
- Ambulance: Scottish
- UK Parliament: West Dunbartonshire
- Scottish Parliament: Dumbarton

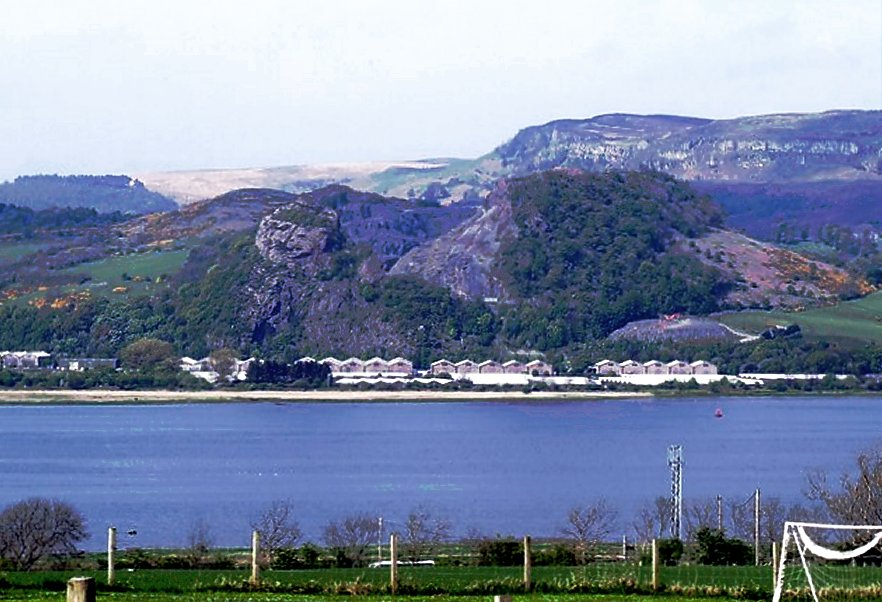
Dumbuck Hill, adjacent to Milton, with Dumbuck Quarry from across the Rive Clyde. The buildings below it are bonded warehouses for the storage of Scotch whisky.

Milton (historically Milton of Colquhoun) is a village in West Dunbartonshire, Scotland. It lies about one mile (two kilometres) east of Dumbarton, on the A82 Glasgow-Loch Lomond road and below the Overtoun Bridge.

It previously had a primary school, closed in 2004. The first school was in what is now quite an old building on the road to Overtoun. The second school building was on the main road, it was still open in the early 2000s.

Milton also has an SSPCA animal rescue centre. It also includes Dumbuck Quarry, which has removed a large part of Dumbuck Hill.

The North Clyde Line railway runs past the village, but it has never had a station – the closest are about one mile (two kilometres) away, at Dumbarton East to the west and Bowling to the east.

Its main claim to fame is that it was the home of Jackie Stewart, the racing driver. His family ran the Dumbuck Garage in the village. Another native is Ian Napier, the fighter ace.

Milton House is an 18th-century mansion located on Milton Brae to the north of the village. It is a Category B listed building.
