= Overtoun House =

19th-century country house and estate in West Dunbartonshire, Scotland

Overtoun House, looking east
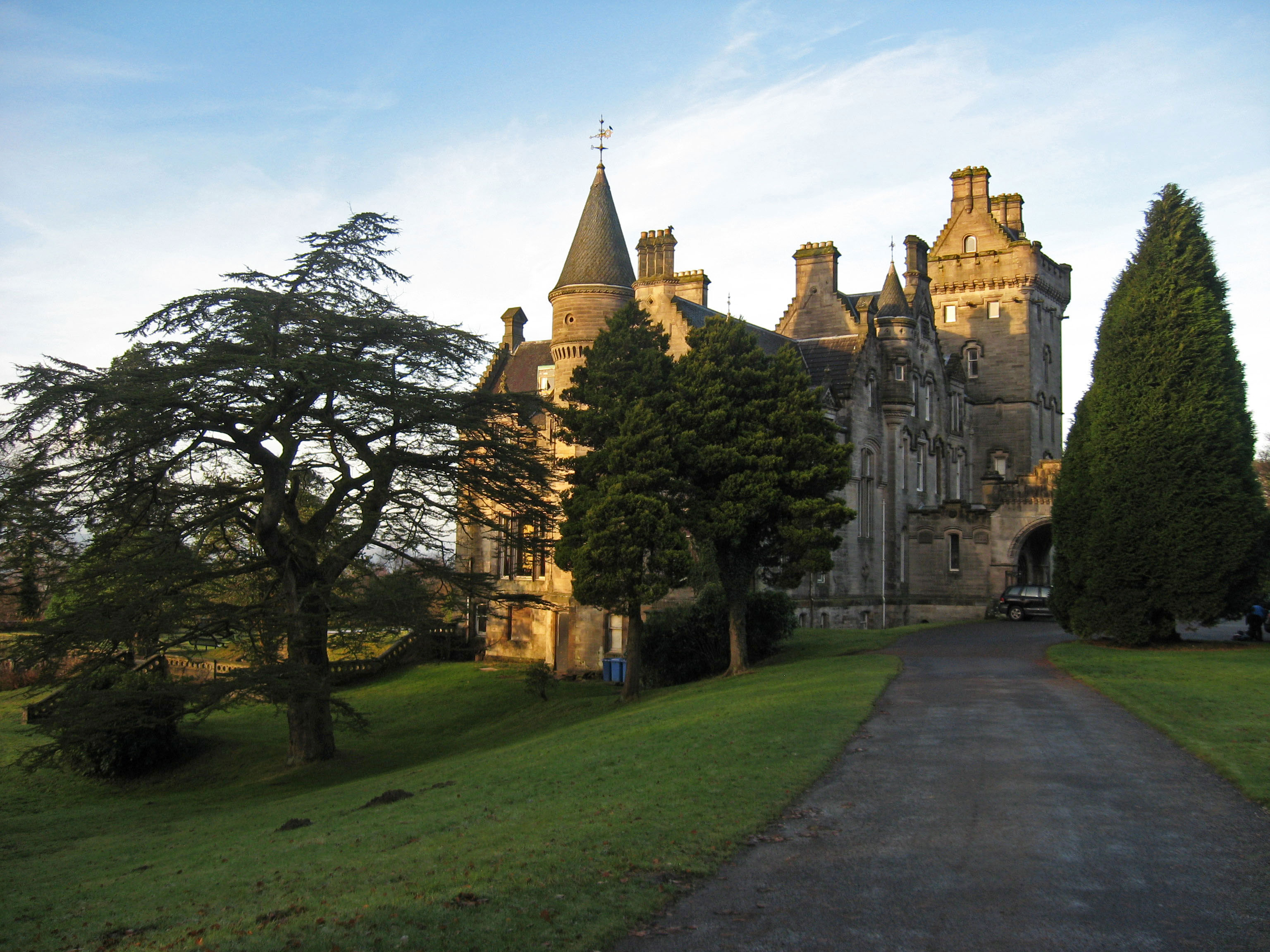
- Overtoun House

- Location of Overtoun House in West Dunbartonshire
- 55.952272°N 4.524602°W
- Location: Milton, West Dunbartonshire, Scotland

History
- Built: 1862
- Built for: James White

Site notes
- Architect: James Smith
- Architectural style: Scots Baronial

Listed Building – Category A
- Designated: 3 March 1971
- Reference no.: LB24907

Inventory of Gardens and Designed Landscapes in Scotland
- Official name: Overtoun House
- Criteria: Historical; Architectural
- Designated: 31 March 2006
- Reference no.: GDL00306

Overtoun House is a 19th-century country house and estate in West Dunbartonshire, Scotland. Situated on a hill overlooking the River Clyde, it is two kilometres (1.2 mi) north of the village of Milton and three kilometres (1.9 mi) east of the town of Dumbarton. The house, an example of Scottish Baronial architecture, was built in the 1860s, and was donated to the people of Dumbarton in 1938. It was subsequently a maternity hospital, and now houses a Christian centre. The house is protected as a category A listed building, while the grounds are included in the Inventory of Gardens and Designed Landscapes in Scotland. Landscape features include the Overtoun Bridge on the approach road, designed by H. E. Milner.

== Estate history ==
=== White family ===
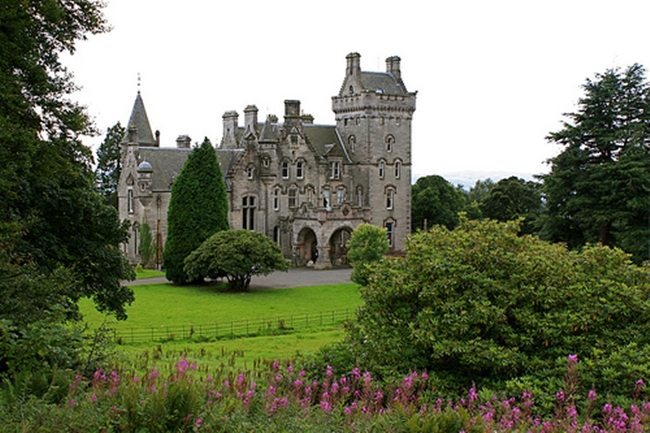
View of the house and gardens from the north

In 1859, James White, a retired lawyer and a co-owner of the J & J White Chemical Works in Rutherglen, bought Overtoun Farm with the purpose of building a mansion there. He intended for it to be a country retreat, and initially acquired 900 acres (360 ha); he soon increased this to 2,000 acres (810 ha). White hired the Glasgow-based architect James Smith (1808–1863) (father of the murder suspect Madeleine Smith) to design and construct the house. A farmhouse on the site was demolished to make way for the mansion. Overtoun House was built between 1860 and 1863, though Smith died before work was completed, and the house was completed by one of his partners. White's family began living in the mansion in 1862. It is recorded that the grounds were laid out by Mr C Kemp of Birkenhead, which is thought to refer to the landscape gardener Edward Kemp (1817–1891), who was superintendent of Birkenhead Park for Joseph Paxton.

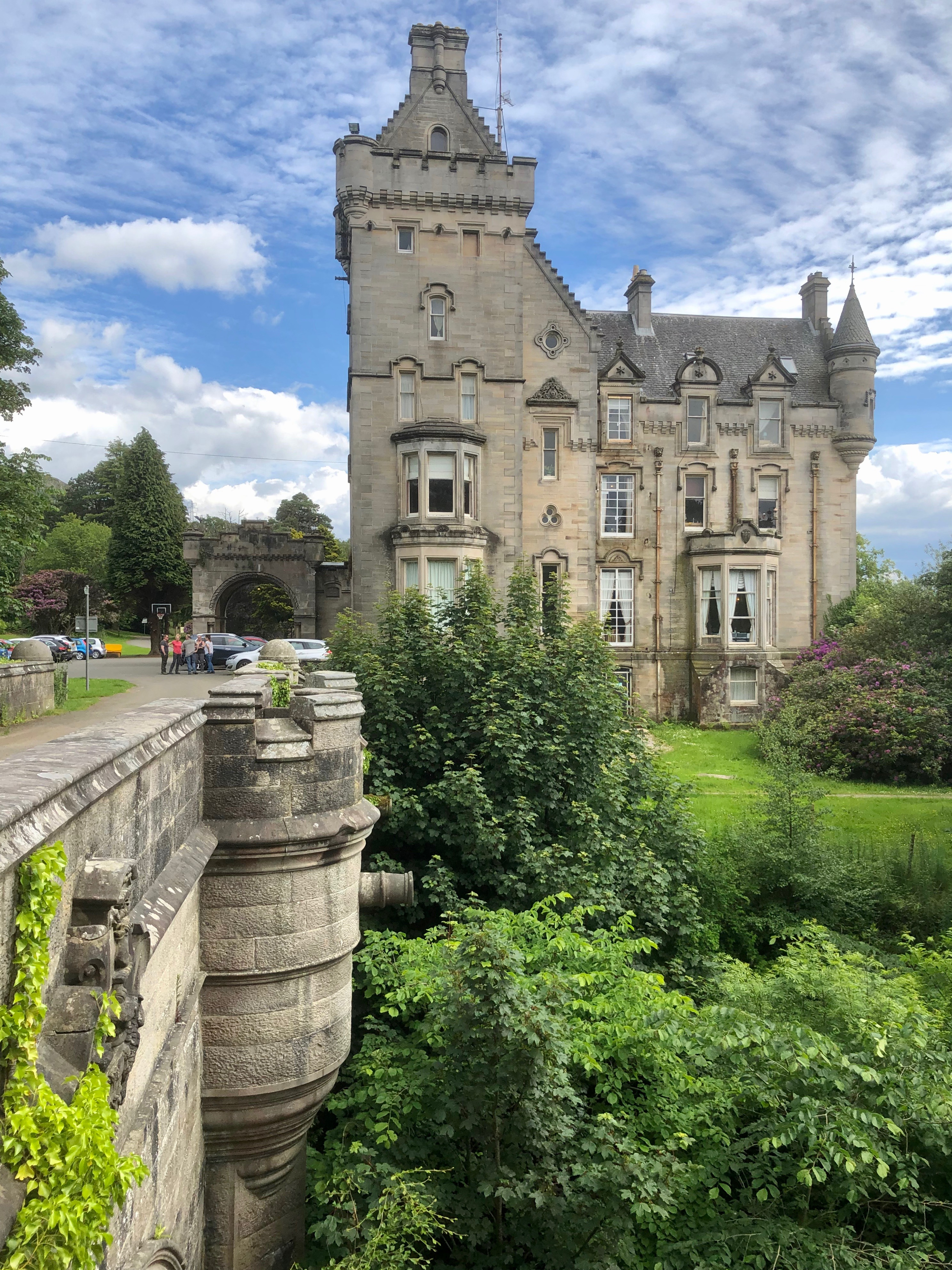
On the west side of the house, Overtoun Bridge spans a deep ravine.

In 1884 James White died, and his son John moved to the estate in 1891 after the death of his mother. John White wanted the house to be expanded further, so he came to an agreement in 1892 with a local minister, Reverend Dixon Swan, the heir to the adjacent Garshake Farm lands. Under the deal, John White was able to lay out the West Drive and its lodge. The eastern and western sides of the estate were split by a waterfall on the Overtoun Burn. To connect the two sides, a road was built and the Overtoun Bridge erected to designs by Henry Milner, son of Edward Milner.

John White took the additional surname of Campbell, and was elevated to the peerage as Baron Overtoun in 1893. However, he died childless in 1908, and was succeeded by his nephew Dr Douglas White, a London-based general practitioner. Lady Overtoun continued to live in the house until 1931, after which Dr White, who seldom visited Scotland, gave the house to the people of Dumbarton in 1938.

=== Later reuse ===
During the Second World War Overtoun was turned into a convalescent home for injured soldiers and locals. The house remained mainly isolated, and it was not damaged by the bombings of the nearby Clydeside shipyards.

In 1947 Overtoun was turned into a maternity hospital. A fire destroyed part of the house in 1948, although there were no deaths, and the hospital remained in operation until 1 September 1970. By this time many of the garden structures, including a folly castle and the walled garden, had been demolished. In 1975 the British government decided to use the house as a base for its Quality of Life Experiment. From 1978 to 1980, a religious group, the Spire Fellowship, utilised the home, and from 1981 to 1994, the estate was used by a group named Youth with a Mission.

The house fell into abandonment soon after Youth with a Mission left the area, but in 2001 Pastor Bob Hill from Fort Worth, Texas, leased the property from West Dunbartonshire Council to use as a Christian centre and tearoom. The house was used in the 2012 film Cloud Atlas, where it doubled for the house of Vyvyan Ayrs in the 1936 segment, and Aurora House in the 2012 segment. "Regeneration", which was partially filmed in Overtoun House, is a 1997 film adaptation of the novel of the same name by Pat Barker. The house was used in Caro Emerald's 2013 video for I belong to You.

In October 1994 a man killed his baby son by throwing him from Overtoun Bridge. Since 2005 there have been a number of media reports of dogs making what appeared to be a suicidal leap from it. This was attributed to supernatural influence, or explained by the dogs being attracted by scents then losing balance on the sloping parapet of the bridge.
