= West Dunbartonshire Council elections =

Local government elections in West Dunbartonshire, Scotland

West Dunbartonshire Council in Scotland holds elections every five years, previously holding them every four years from its creation as a single-tier authority in 1995 to 2007.

== Council elections ==
Year	Labour	SNP	WDCP	Socialist	Conservative	Independent
1995	14	7	0	0	0	1
1999 (Note: New ward boundaries.)	14	7	0	0	0	1
2003	17	3	0	1	0	1
2007 (Note: Change to single transferable vote system and new ward boundaries.)	10	9	0	1	0	2
2012	12	6	0	1	0	3
2017 (Note: New ward boundaries.)	8	10	1	0	2	1
2022	12	9	1	0	0	0

== Results maps ==
1995 results map

== By-elections ==
=== 2003-2007 ===
Bowling/Milton/Old Kilpatrick By-Election 14 October 2004
Party	Candidate	Votes	%	±%
Independent	George Black	605	34.5	+34.5
SNP		522	29.8	−28.7
Labour		422	24.1	−17.4
Conservative		141	8.0	+8.0
Scottish Socialist		64	3.6	+3.6
Majority		83	4.7	
Turnout		1,754		
Independent gain from SNP		Swing		

Dumbarton West By-Election 17 March 2005
Party	Candidate	Votes	%	±%
Labour	Joseph Pilkington	607	50.8	−10.4
SNP		287	24.0	+3.4
Independent		141	11.8	+11.8
Scottish Socialist		130	10.9	−7.3
Conservative		30	2.5	+2.5
Majority		320	26.8	
Turnout		1,195		
Labour hold		Swing		

Dumbarton West By-Election 15 June 2006
Party	Candidate	Votes	%	±%
SNP	Iain Robertson	592	45.1	+21.1
Labour		588	44.8	−6.0
Scottish Socialist		75	5.7	−5.2
Conservative		58	4.4	+1.9
Majority		4	0.3	
Turnout		1,313		
SNP gain from Labour		Swing		

=== 2007-2012 ===
Kilpatrick By-Election 3 March 2011
Party	Candidate	FPv%	Count
Party	Candidate	FPv%	1
Labour	Lawrence O'Neill	60.0	1,382
SNP	Frank McNiff	32.9	758
Conservative	Douglas Boyle	7.0	161
Labour hold			
Valid: 2,301 Spoilt: 26 Quota: 1,151 Turnout: 2,327

=== 2022-2027 ===
Clydebank Central By-Election 13 June 2024
Party	Candidate	FPv%	Count			
Party	Candidate	FPv%	1	2	3	4
Labour	Fiona Hennebry	49.6	1,398	1,400	1,404	1,425
SNP	Marina Scanlan	38.9	1,095	1,099	1,118	1,127
Conservative	Ewan McGinnigle	4.4	125	126	126	130
Independent	Andrew Muir	3.1	87	87	91	98
Liberal Democrats	Kai Pyper	1.8	52	56	59	
Communist	Nathan Hennebry	1.7	47	47		
Independent	Kelly Wilson	0.4	12			
Labour hold						
Valid: 2,816 Spoilt: 29 Quota: 1,409 Turnout: 2,845

Kilpatrick By-Election 28 November 2024
Party	Candidate	FPv%	Count					
Party	Candidate	FPv%	1	2	3	4	5	6
Labour	William Rooney	42.8	725	731	736	753	782	814
SNP	Marina Scanlan	30.3	514	514	518	523	559	564
Reform	David Smith	10.4	176	178	184	186	191	200
Conservative	Ewan McGinnigle	5.7	97	97	97	102	103	
Green	Paula Baker	4.3	73	83	84	95		
Liberal Democrats	Kai O'Connor	3.7	63	64	66			
Scottish Family	Andrew Muir	1.5	25	25				
Communist	Dylan McAllister	1.4	23					
Labour hold								
Valid: 1,696 Spoilt: 9 Quota: 849 Turnout: 1,705

Clydebank Waterfront By-Election 15 May 2025
Party	Candidate	FPv%	Count						
Party	Candidate	FPv%	1	2	3	4	5	6	7
SNP	Kevin Crawford	35.6	1,039	1,042	1,061	1,095	1,098	1,123	1,331
Reform	David Smith	26.3	768	722	780	782	808	840	919
Labour	Maureen McGlinchey	25.3	739	742	745	759	770	822	
Liberal Democrats	Cameron Eoin Stewart	4.7	138	138	138	154	167		
Conservative	Brian Walker	2.9	84	85	85	87			
Green	Eryn Browning	2.6	76	77	83				
Alba	Kristopher Duncan	1.6	47	51					
Scottish Family	Andrew Muir	0.9	25						
SNP hold									
Valid: 2,916 Spoilt: 38 Quota: 1,459 Turnout: 2,954
