= 1999 West Dunbartonshire Council election =

1999 Scottish local government election

← 1995	6 May 1999	2003 →

All 22 seats to West Dunbartonshire Council 12 seats needed for a majority
	First party	Second party	Third party
Leader	Andrew White	Ronald McColl	Jim Bollan
Party	Labour	SNP	Independent
Leader's seat	Linnvale/Drumry	Balloch	Renton/Alexandria South
Last election	14 seats, 50.4%	7 seats, 42.7%	1 seat, 2.4%
Seats before	13	9	0
Seats won	14	7	1
Seat change	Steady	Steady	Steady
Popular vote	22,633	19,705	971
Percentage	52.2%	45.4%	2.2%
Swing	▲1.8%	▲2.7%	▼0.2%
Council Leader before election
Andrew White
Labour
Council Leader after election
Andrew White
Labour

The 1999 West Dunbartonshire Council election was held on the 6 May 1999 and were the second to the unitary authority, which was created, along with 28 other local authorities, under the Local Government etc (Scotland) Act 1994.

== Results ==
1999 West Dunbartonshire Council election result
Party	Seats	Gains	Losses	Net gain/loss	Seats %	Votes %	Votes	+/−
Labour	14	2	2	Steady	63.6	52.2	22,633	▲1.8
SNP	7	2	2	Steady	31.8	45.4	19,705	▲2.7
Independent	1	1	1	Steady	4.5	2.2	971	▼0.2
Conservative	0	0	0	Steady	0.0	0.2	77	▼1.0

== Ward results ==
Ward 1: Whitecrook
Party	Candidate	Votes	%
SNP	James McElhill	1,101	54.1
Labour	Denis Agnew	936	45.9
Majority		165	8.2
Turnout		2,054	58.9
SNP hold			

Ward 2: Dalmuir/Central
Party	Candidate	Votes	%
Labour	Mary Campbell††	878	51.1
SNP	John Keegan	840	48.9
Majority		38	2.2
Turnout		1,738	49.2
Labour hold			

Ward 3: Mountblow
Party	Candidate	Votes	%
Labour	Daniel McCafferty††	1,228	53.5
SNP	William G. Hendrie	1,068	45.5
Majority		160	7.0
Turnout		2,317	59.9
Labour hold			

Ward 4: Parkhall
Party	Candidate	Votes	%
Labour	John Syme††	1,099	57.2
SNP	Raymond Young	824	42.8
Majority		275	14.4
Turnout		1,944	62.8
Labour hold			

Ward 5: Linnvale/Drumry
Party	Candidate	Votes	%
Labour	Andrew White	1,210	61.7
SNP	Alexander Scullion	752	38.3
Majority		458	23.4
Turnout		1,976	60.5
Labour hold			

Ward 6: Kilbowie
Party	Candidate	Votes	%
Labour	Anthony Devine	1,059	56.8
SNP	Valerie Kean	804	43.2
Majority		255	13.6
Turnout		1,879	60.9
Labour hold			

Ward 7: Kilbowie West
Party	Candidate	Votes	%
Labour	Alistair Macdonald	1,287	70.8
SNP	William Wilson	530	29.2
Majority		757	41.6
Turnout		1,824	60.8
Labour hold			

Ward 8: Faifley
Party	Candidate	Votes	%
Labour	Mary Collins††	938	56.0
SNP	Alan Gordon	738	44.0
Majority		200	12.0
Turnout		1,691	54.4
Labour hold			

Ward 9: Hardgate
Party	Candidate	Votes	%
SNP	John McDonald	934	51.3
Labour	Patricia Rice	887	48.7
Majority		47	2.6
Turnout		1,848	63.2
SNP gain from Labour			

Ward 10: Duntocher
Party	Candidate	Votes	%
Labour	Duncan McDonald	1,463	66.9
SNP	William S. Ramsay	723	33.1
Majority		740	33.8
Turnout		2,209	61.8
Labour hold			

Ward 11: Bowling/Milton/Old Kilpatrick
Party	Candidate	Votes	%
SNP	John McCutcheon	1,585	58.9
Labour	Adam H. Hay	1,106	41.1
Majority		479	17.8
Turnout		2,721	66.3
SNP gain from Independent			

Ward 12: Dumbarton East
Party	Candidate	Votes	%
Labour	Linda McColl	1,025	52.1
SNP	John McNeil	739	37.5
Independent	Samuel McCallum	205	10.4
Majority		286	14.6
Turnout		1,991	69.4
Labour gain from SNP			

Ward 13: Barloan/Overtoun
Party	Candidate	Votes	%
SNP	Iain Robertson	1,210	52.0
Labour	John Duffy	1,116	48.0
Majority		94	4.0
Turnout		2,365	65.3
SNP hold			

Ward 14: Dumbarton North
Party	Candidate	Votes	%
Labour	Geoffrey Calvert	1,075	59.5
SNP	David Logan	731	40.5
Majority		344	19.0
Turnout		1,836	53.4
Labour hold			

Ward 15: Dumbarton Central
Party	Candidate	Votes	%
Labour	James McCallum	914	51.6
SNP	William Mackechnie	858	48.4
Majority		56	3.2
Turnout		1,803	59.8
Labour hold			

Ward 16: Dumbarton West
Party	Candidate	Votes	%
Labour	John Trainer	1,034	52.7
SNP	David Logan	850	43.3
Conservative	Brian Vosper	77	4.0
Majority		184	9.4
Turnout		1,967	58.1
Labour hold			

Ward 17: Renton/Alexandria South
Party	Candidate	Votes	%
Independent	Jim Bollan†	766	39.1
Labour	James Boyle	613	31.3
SNP	Derek Wilson	581	29.6
Majority		153	8.8
Turnout		1,981	64.7
Independent gain from Labour			

Ward 18: Alexandria North/Tullichewan
Party	Candidate	Votes	%
SNP	Craig McLaughlin	1,004	51.0
Labour	David Ballantyne	963	49.0
Majority		41	2.0
Turnout		1,994	59.2
SNP hold			

Ward 19: Balloch
Party	Candidate	Votes	%
SNP	Ronald McColl	1,048	51.7
Labour	Martin Rooney	980	48.3
Majority		68	3.4
Turnout		2,059	66.9
SNP hold			

Ward 20: Haldane/Kilmaronock/Jamestown
Party	Candidate	Votes	%
SNP	Margaret McGregor	1,151	59.9
Labour	William Hemphill	772	40.1
Majority		379	19.8
Turnout		1,971	57.7
SNP hold			

Ward 21: Bonhill East
Party	Candidate	Votes	%
Labour	James Flynn	1,090	61.5
SNP	Elsie Mackechnie	683	38.5
Majority		407	23.0
Turnout		1,786	57.0
Labour hold			

Ward 22: Riverside
Party	Candidate	Votes	%
Labour	Connie O'Sullivan	960	50.2
SNP	James Chirrey	951	49.8
Majority		9	0.4
Turnout		1,942	61.4
Labour gain from SNP			

== Aftermath ==
Independent councillor Jim Bollan became a member of the newly formed Scottish Socialist Party in 2000.

In May 2001, after the wrongful dismissal of the council's Chief Executive, 4 Labour councillors, Councillors Campbell, McCafferty, Syme and Collins, rebelled against the party's administration to vote for a no confidence motion in the Council leader, Andrew White. The vote passed 12-10, but Councillor White refused to resign. The 4 councillors later left the Labour party to become independents and formed a new administration in August of that year with support from the SNP and SSP councillors. The new Council leader was Daniel McCafferty, one of the rebels.
