= 2003 West Dunbartonshire Council election =

2003 Scottish local government election

← 1999	1 May 2003	2007 →

All 22 seats to West Dunbartonshire Council 12 seats needed for a majority
	First party	Second party
Leader	Andrew White	Ronald McColl
Party	Labour	SNP
Leader's seat	Linnvale/Drumry	Balloch
Last election	14 seats, 52.2%	7 seats, 45.4%
Seats before	10	7
Seats won	17	3
Seat change	▲3	▼4
Popular vote	16,443	11,816
Percentage	46.8%	33.6%
Swing	▼5.4%	▼11.8%
	Third party	Fourth party
Leader	Jim Bollan	Dennis Brogan
Party	Scottish Socialist	Independent
Leader's seat	Renton/Alexandria South	Whitecrook
Last election	Did not contest	1 seat, 2.2%
Seats before	1	4
Seats won	1	1
Seat change	▲1	Steady
Popular vote	3,538	2,273
Percentage	10.1%	6.5%
Swing	New	▲4.3%
Council Leader before election
Daniel McCafferty
Independent
Council Leader after election
Andrew White
Labour

The 2003 West Dunbartonshire Council election were held on the 1 May 2003 and were the third to the unitary authority, which was created along with 28 other local authorities, under the Local Government etc (Scotland) Act 1994. They were also the last held under the single-member constituency first past the post system.

== Results ==
2003 West Dunbartonshire Council election result
Party	Seats	Gains	Losses	Net gain/loss	Seats %	Votes %	Votes	+/−
Labour	17	3	0	▲3	77.3	46.8	16,443	▼5.4
SNP	3	0	4	▼4	13.6	33.6	11,816	▼11.8
Scottish Socialist	1	1	0	▲1	4.6	10.1	3,538	New
Independent	1	1	1	Steady	4.6	6.5	2,273	▲4.3
Conservative	0	0	0	Steady	0.0	3.0	1,063	▲2.9

== Ward results ==
Ward 1: Whitecrook
Party	Candidate	Votes	%
Independent	Dennis Brogan	1,006	57.95
Labour	Robert Marshall	416	23.96
SNP	Donald McKinlay	314	18.09
Majority		590	33.99
Turnout		1,745	53.2
Independent gain from SNP			

Ward 2: Dalmuir/Central
Party	Candidate	Votes	%
Labour	Gail Casey	616	47.02
SNP	John Keegan	444	33.89
Independent	Mary Campbell	250	18.09
Majority		172	13.13
Turnout		1,326	38.1
Labour hold			

Ward 3: Mountblow
Party	Candidate	Votes	%
Labour	Jackie Maceira	1,025	52.65
SNP	William G. Hendrie	712	36.57
Scottish Socialist	Frank J. Hotchkiss	210	10.78
Majority		313	16.08
Turnout		1,982	51.2
Labour hold			

Ward 4: Parkhall
Party	Candidate	Votes	%
Labour	Alistair Macdonald	1,037	62.32
SNP	William S. Ramsay	422	25.36
Independent	Lockhart Cameron	205	12.32
Majority		615	36.96
Turnout		1,679	54.4
Labour hold			

Ward 5: Linnvale/Drumry
Party	Candidate	Votes	%
Labour	Andrew White	696	46.93
SNP	Alexander Scullion	431	29.06
Independent	Alexander Doherty	356	24.01
Majority		265	17.87
Turnout		1,499	46.7
Labour hold			

Ward 6: Kilbowie
Party	Candidate	Votes	%
Labour	Anthony Devine	785	53.26
SNP	James Brown	548	37.18
Scottish Socialist	Cameron Fyfe	141	9.56
Majority		237	16.08
Turnout		1,496	51.1
Labour hold			

Ward 7: Kilbowie West
Party	Candidate	Votes	%
Labour	Denis Agnew	865	58.72
SNP	Ronald MacDonald	364	24.71
Scottish Socialist	Thomas Kirkwood	244	16.56
Majority		501	34.01
Turnout		1,486	49.6
Labour hold			

Ward 8: Faifley
Party	Candidate	Votes	%
Labour	Margaret Bootland	659	54.69
SNP	James Finn	382	31.70
Scottish Socialist	Dawn Brennan	164	13.61
Majority		277	22.99
Turnout		1,219	40.7
Labour hold			

Ward 9: Hardgate
Party	Candidate	Votes	%
Labour	Douglas McAllister	893	58.83
SNP	John McDonald	625	41.17
Majority		268	17.66
Turnout		1,542	54.0
Labour gain from SNP			

Ward 10: Duntocher
Party	Candidate	Votes	%
Labour	Duncan McDonald	1,300	73.03
SNP	Gareth Finn	480	26.97
Majority		820	46.06
Turnout		1,806	52.8
Labour hold			

Ward 11: Bowling/Milton/Old Kilpatrick
Party	Candidate	Votes	%
SNP	Raymond Young	1,259	58.53
Labour	William McLaughlin	892	41.47
Majority		367	17.06
Turnout		2,211	55.4
SNP hold			

Ward 12: Dumbarton East
Party	Candidate	Votes	%
Labour	Linda McColl	778	43.71
Independent	Alistair Tuach	456	25.62
SNP	John McNeil	422	23.71
Scottish Socialist	Helen Hamilton	124	6.96
Majority		322	18.09
Turnout		1,797	56.3
Labour hold			

Ward 13: Barloan/Overtoun
Party	Candidate	Votes	%
Labour	Marie McNair	709	36.49
SNP	Iain Robertson	688	35.41
Conservative	Martyn A. McIntyre	350	18.01
Scottish Socialist	Mark Porciani	194	9.99
Majority		21	1.08
Turnout		1,957	55.0
Labour gain from SNP			

Ward 14: Dumbarton North
Party	Candidate	Votes	%
Labour	Geoffrey Calvert	725	57.63
SNP	James Cormack	348	27.66
Scottish Socialist	Ian Gartshore	185	14.71
Majority		377	29.97
Turnout		1,274	41.2
Labour hold			

Ward 15: Dumbarton Central
Party	Candidate	Votes	%
Labour	James McCallum	815	51.81
SNP	William Barlow	376	23.90
Conservative	David Kinniburgh	217	13.80
Scottish Socialist	Alexander Cunningham	165	10.49
Majority		439	27.91
Turnout		1,590	51.4
Labour hold			

Ward 16: Dumbarton West
Party	Candidate	Votes	%
Labour	John Duffy	875	59.13
SNP	Ann Robertson	294	20.57
Scottish Socialist	David Logan	260	18.20
Majority		581	40.66
Turnout		1,453	46.4
Labour hold			

Ward 17: Renton/Alexandria South
Party	Candidate	Votes	%
Scottish Socialist	Jim Bollan	1,074	66.46
SNP	William Hutchison	542	33.54
Majority		532	32.92
Turnout		1,692	52.0
Scottish Socialist gain from Independent			

Ward 18: Alexandria North/Tullichewan
Party	Candidate	Votes	%
SNP	Craig McLaughlin	796	50.96
Labour	Joseph Sheridan	574	36.75
Scottish Socialist	Louise Robertson	192	12.29
Majority		222	14.21
Turnout		1,585	51.2
SNP hold			

Ward 19: Balloch
Party	Candidate	Votes	%
Labour	Martin Rooney	734	40.09
SNP	Ronald McColl	620	33.86
Conservative	Terence Stables	340	18.57
Scottish Socialist	Archibald Henderson	137	7.48
Majority		114	6.23
Turnout		1,845	58.9
Labour gain from SNP			

Ward 20: Haldane/Kilmaronock/Jamestown
Party	Candidate	Votes	%
SNP	Margaret McGregor	854	58.17
Labour	Alistair Lang	477	32.49
Scottish Socialist	Harry Holleway	137	9.33
Majority		377	25.68
Turnout		1,506	48.3
SNP hold			

Ward 21: Bonhill East
Party	Candidate	Votes	%
Labour	James Flynn	790	63.45
SNP	Joseph Callaghan	307	24.66
Scottish Socialist	Les Robertson	148	11.89
Majority		483	38.79
Turnout		1,257	45.9
Labour hold			

Ward 22: Riverside
Party	Candidate	Votes	%
Labour	Connie O'Sullivan	782	46.30
SNP	James Chirrey	588	34.81
Scottish Socialist	Anne-Marie Timmoney	163	9.65
Conservative	David Jardine	156	9.24
Majority		194	11.49
Turnout		1,699	51.7
Labour hold			
