= 1995 West Dunbartonshire Council election =

1995 Scottish local government election

- 6 April 1995

All 22 seats to West Dunbartonshire Council 12 seats needed for a majority
	First party	Second party	Third party
Leader	Mary Campbell	William Mackechnie	Bill Kemp
Party	Labour	SNP	Independent
Leader's seat	Dalmuir/Central	Dumbarton/Bowling	Old Kilpatrick
Seats won	14	7	1
Popular vote	18,311	15,508	863
Percentage	50.4%	42.7%	2.4%
- Results by ward
Council Leader
Mary Campbell
Labour

The 1995 West Dunbartonshire Council election was held on the 6 April 1995 and were the first for the newly formed unitary authority, which was created under the Local Government etc (Scotland) Act 1994 and replaced the previous two-tier system of local government under Strathclyde Regional Council and Dumbarton and Clydebank District Councils.

== Results ==
1995 West Dunbartonshire Council election result
Party	Seats	Gains	Losses	Net gain/loss	Seats %	Votes %	Votes	+/−
Labour	14	-	-		63.6	50.4	18,311	New
SNP	7	-	-		31.8	42.7	15,508	New
Independent	1	-	-		4.5	2.4	863	New
Conservative	0	-	-		0.0	1.2	434	New
Independent Dumbarton Tenants & Residents	0	-	-		0.0	1.2	432	New
Independent Labour	0	-	-		0.0	0.9	313	New
Representing Your Views at All Times	0	-	-		0.0	0.8	278	New
Liberal Democrats	0	-	-		0.0	0.3	103	New
Civil Servant	0	-	-		0.0	0.2	83	New

== Ward results ==
Ward 1: Whitecrook
Party	Candidate	Votes	%
SNP	James McElhill	1,023	55.8
Labour	Mary Collins	811	44.2
Majority		212	11.6
Turnout		1,834	53.4
SNP win (new seat)			

Ward 2: Dalmuir/Central
Party	Candidate	Votes	%
Labour	Mary Campbell	854	59.3
SNP	John Keegan	586	40.7
Majority		268	19.4
Turnout		1,440	39.9
Labour win (new seat)			

Ward 3: Mountblow
Party	Candidate	Votes	%
Labour	Daniel McCafferty	984	53.7
SNP	Martin Docherty	848	46.3
Majority		136	7.4
Turnout		1,832	55.7
Labour win (new seat)			

Ward 4: Parkhall
Party	Candidate	Votes	%
Labour	John Syme	1,279	60.5
SNP	William Hendrie	834	39.5
Majority		445	21.0
Turnout		2,113	59.4
Labour win (new seat)			

Ward 5: Linnvale/Drumry
Party	Candidate	Votes	%
Labour	Andrew White	1,065	68.8
SNP	Ronald MacDonald	484	31.2
Majority		581	37.6
Turnout		1,549	46.3
Labour win (new seat)			

Ward 6: Kilbowie
Party	Candidate	Votes	%
Labour	Anthony Devine	777	51.3
SNP	James Yuill	739	48.7
Majority		38	2.6
Turnout		1,516	53.5
Labour win (new seat)			

Ward 7: Kilbowie West
Party	Candidate	Votes	%
Labour	Alistair Macdonald	1,224	75.2
SNP	William Wilson	404	24.8
Majority		820	50.4
Turnout		1,628	48.6
Labour win (new seat)			

Ward 8: Faifley
Party	Candidate	Votes	%
Labour	James Doherty	662	50.1
SNP	Alan Gordon	347	26.2
Independent Labour	Catherine Durning	313	23.7
Majority		315	23.9
Turnout		1,322	42.2
Labour win (new seat)			

Ward 9: Faifley North/Hardgate
Party	Candidate	Votes	%
Labour	Patricia Rice	632	45.7
SNP	John McCutcheon	413	29.8
Conservative	Kenneth Veitch	339	24.5
Majority		219	25.9
Turnout		1,384	46.5
Labour win (new seat)			

Ward 10: Duntocher
Party	Candidate	Votes	%
Labour	George Cairney	835	55.8
SNP	Scot Ramsay	567	37.9
Conservative	William McCrossan	95	6.3
Majority		286	17.9
Turnout		1,497	50.4
Labour win (new seat)			

Ward 11: Old Kilpatrick
Party	Candidate	Votes	%
Independent	William Kemp	863	52.9
Labour	James Boyle	540	33.1
SNP	Alexander Scullion	228	14.0
Majority		323	19.8
Turnout		1,631	54.1
Independent win (new seat)			

Ward 12: Dumbarton West
Party	Candidate	Votes	%
Labour	Patrick O'Neill	901	66.3
SNP	Bob Doris	458	33.7
Majority		443	32.6
Turnout		1,359	40.7
Labour win (new seat)			

Ward 13: Dumbarton Central
Party	Candidate	Votes	%
Labour Co-op	James McCallum	873	54.8
SNP	Douglas Lockhart	721	45.2
Majority		152	9.6
Turnout		1,594	45.0
Labour Co-op win (new seat)			

Ward 14: Dumbarton North
Party	Candidate	Votes	%
Labour Co-op	Geoffrey Calvert	951	55.9
SNP	David Logan	751	44.1
Majority		200	11.8
Turnout		1,702	45.0
Labour Co-op win (new seat)			

Ward 15: Dumbarton South
Party	Candidate	Votes	%
SNP	John Jun Wailes	890	39.7
Labour	Alexander Tuach	814	36.4
Independent Dumbarton Tenants & Residents	Thomas McCallion	432	19.3
Liberal Democrats	Vaughan Moody	103	4.6
Majority		76	3.3
Turnout		2,239	58.7
SNP win (new seat)			

Ward 16: Dumbarton/Bowling
Party	Candidate	Votes	%
SNP	William Mackechnie	1,162	57.1
Labour	John Trainer	596	29.3
Representing Your Views at All Times	Clive Cobby	278	13.6
Majority		556	27.8
Turnout		2,036	53.8
SNP win (new seat)			

Ward 17: Renton/Alexandria South
Party	Candidate	Votes	%
Labour	Duncan Mills	775	58.4
SNP	James Cormack	552	41.6
Majority		223	16.8
Turnout		1,327	50.5
Labour win (new seat)			

Ward 18: Alexandria North/Tullichewan
Party	Candidate	Votes	%
SNP	Craig McLaughlin	997	58.8
Labour	Maurice McIntyre	699	41.2
Majority		298	17.6
Turnout		1,696	48.5
SNP win (new seat)			

Ward 19: Balloch
Party	Candidate	Votes	%
SNP	Ronald McColl	949	58.5
Labour	John Gilleece	674	41.5
Majority		275	17.0
Turnout		1,623	48.9
SNP win (new seat)			

Ward 20: Haldane/Kilmaronock/Jamestown
Party	Candidate	Votes	%
SNP	Margaret McGregor	951	61.4
Labour	Ernest Horan	597	38.6
Majority		354	22.8
Turnout		1,548	46.7
SNP win (new seat)			

Ward 21: Bonhill East
Party	Candidate	Votes	%
Labour	James Flynn	1,132	57.5
SNP	Gordon Smillie	835	42.5
Majority		297	15.0
Turnout		1,967	54.0
Labour win (new seat)			

Ward 22: Riverside
Party	Candidate	Votes	%
SNP	James Chirrey	769	51.7
Labour	Jane Lindsay	636	42.7
Civil Servant	Bryan F Maher	83	5.6
Majority		133	9.0
Turnout		1,488	46.4
SNP win (new seat)			

== Changes before next election ==
A by-election was held in the Old Kilpatrick ward on 28 November 1996 to replace Independent Councillor Bill Kemp, who resigned in protest at the way the council was being run.

Ward 11: Old Kilpatrick by-election (28 November 1996)
Party	Candidate	Votes	%	±%
SNP	John McCutcheon	760	61.79	
Labour	James Boyle	470	38.21	
Majority		290	23.58	
Turnout		1,230		
SNP gain from Independent		Swing		

A by-election was held on 13 August 1998 to replace the deceased Provost, Patrick O'Neill.

Ward 12: Dumbarton West by-election (13 August 1998)
Party	Candidate	Votes	%	±%
SNP	David Logan	611	44.66	
Labour	Alexander Tuach	588	42.98	
Liberal Democrats	Kenneth Shepherd	90	6.58	
A Hard Worker in the Community	Martin Hollern	46	3.36	
Conservative	Brian Vosper	33	2.41	
Majority		23	1.68	
Turnout		1,368		
SNP gain from Labour		Swing		
