= List of listed buildings in Bonhill, West Dunbartonshire =

This is a list of listed buildings in the southern part of the parish of Bonhill, in West Dunbartonshire, Scotland. The northern part of Bonhill parish is within Argyll and Bute. See List of listed buildings in Bonhill, Argyll and Bute.

== List ==
Name	Location	Date listed	Geo-coordinates	Notes	Category	LB number	Image
Balloch Castle, Walled Garden			56°00′32″N 4°34′57″W		B	43222	Upload Photo
Jamestown Primary School With Boundary Wall And Railings			55°59′54″N 4°34′14″W		C(S)	43226	Upload another image
Lower Stoneymullen Road, Drumkinnon Farm			55°59′59″N 4°35′51″W		B	4903	Upload Photo
Bonhill Parish Church With Boundary Wall And Graveyard			55°58′58″N 4°34′27″W		B	1095	Upload another image See more images
Westerton House With Gatepiers And Walled Garden			56°01′05″N 4°32′52″W		B	1127	Upload Photo
Jamestown Parish Church of Scotland With Boundary Wall Railings And Gatepiers			55°59′53″N 4°34′15″W		B	1137	Upload another image See more images
Balloch Castle			56°00′47″N 4°35′01″W		A	123	Upload another image
Alexandria, North Main Street, Argyll Motor Works With Lodge, Gatepiers, Railings And Boundary Wall			55°59′31″N 4°35′02″W		A	127	Upload another image See more images
Alexandria, Bank Street, Vale of Leven Constitutional Club			55°59′11″N 4°34′40″W		C(S)	43194	Upload another image See more images
Alexandria, 252 Main Street			55°59′07″N 4°34′53″W		C(S)	43201	Upload Photo
Alexandria, Queen's Drive, Saint Mungo's Episcopal Church With Hall, Boundary Wall And Gatepiers			55°58′54″N 4°35′01″W		B	43210	Upload Photo
Balloch, Drymen Road, Tullichewan Hotel			56°00′10″N 4°35′00″W		C(S)	43217	Upload Photo
Balloch, Lomond Road, Bridge			56°00′06″N 4°34′52″W		B	43218	Upload Photo
Balloch, Lomond Road, Fisherwood			56°00′04″N 4°34′55″W		B	43219	Upload another image
Alexandria, Christie Park, War Memorial			55°59′25″N 4°35′06″W		B	43197	Upload another image
Alexandria, Overton Road, Vale of Leven Cemetery With Monuments, Bridge, Boundary Wall, Gates And Gatepiers			55°59′03″N 4°35′29″W		B	43206	Upload Photo
Balloch, Balloch Road Bridge			56°00′12″N 4°34′55″W		B	43215	Upload Photo
Cameron House, Mid Lodge With Boundary Wall, Gatepiers, Gates And Railings			56°00′48″N 4°36′40″W		B	1122	Upload Photo
Alexandria, Gilmour Street, Masonic Temple			55°59′13″N 4°35′07″W		A	1135	Upload another image
Alexandria, Main Street, Saint Andrew's Parish Church With Gatepiers, Railings, Graveyard And Smollett Mausoleum			55°59′08″N 4°34′47″W		B	1136	Upload Photo
Alexandria, Glen Alwyn Lodge With Gatepiers And Wall			56°00′05″N 4°35′31″W		B	91	Upload Photo
Alexandria, Albert Street, Methodist Church With Gatepiers And Railings			55°59′01″N 4°34′50″W		C(S)	43191	Upload Photo
Alexandria, Bank Street, Post Office With Gatepiers And Boundary Wall			55°59′11″N 4°34′39″W		C(S)	43192	Upload Photo
Alexandria, 304 Main Street, Ardenlee With Boundary Wall And Gatepiers			55°59′02″N 4°34′54″W		C(S)	43198	Upload Photo
Alexandria, Overton Road, Kirkland With Boundary Wall And Gatepiers			55°59′08″N 4°35′08″W		C(S)	43205	Upload Photo
Balloch Castle, North Lodge With Gatepiers And Boundary Wall			56°00′48″N 4°34′31″W		C(S)	43220	Upload Photo
Alexandria, Gilmour Street, Ewing Gilmour Institute			55°59′14″N 4°34′58″W		B	1096	Upload another image
Cameron House With Terrace Walls			56°00′48″N 4°36′29″W		B	1121	Upload another image
Alexandria, Christie Park With Lodge, Gates, Gatepiers And Boundary Wall			55°59′23″N 4°35′02″W		B	43196	Upload Photo
Alexandria, 354 Main Street, With Boundary Wall			55°58′56″N 4°34′59″W		C(S)	43202	Upload Photo
Alexandria, North Main Street, Bellville With Boundary Wall			55°59′25″N 4°35′01″W		B	43203	Upload Photo
Alexandria, North Main Street, Lodge With Boundary Walls, Gates And Gatepiers			55°59′27″N 4°35′04″W		B	43204	Upload Photo
Alexandria, Middleton Street, Christie Park Primary School With Gatepiers And Boundary Wall And Railings			55°59′19″N 4°35′08″W		C(S)	6610	Upload Photo
Alexandria, Smollett Fountain With Lamp Standards			55°59′16″N 4°34′56″W		B	1134	Upload another image
Loch Lomond, Drumkinnon Bay, Winch House Including Slipway			56°00′28″N 4°35′27″W		A	46721	Upload another image See more images
Bonhill, 120-122 (Even Nos), Main Street And Adjoining Workshop			55°59′08″N 4°34′22″W		B	43224	Upload Photo
Lower Stoneymollen Road, Drumkinnon Farm, Mill, Granary And Saw Mill			55°59′58″N 4°35′50″W		B	43229	Upload Photo
Westerton Lodge Gatepiers And Boundary Wall			56°00′52″N 4°33′04″W		C(S)	43232	Upload another image See more images
Alexandria, 320 Main Street, Niagra With Boundary Walls			55°59′00″N 4°34′56″W		C(S)	43199	Upload Photo
Alexandria, Upper Smollett Road, Alexandria House With Boundary Walls And Gatepiers			55°59′05″N 4°35′08″W		C(S)	43212	Upload Photo
Balloch, Drymen Road, The Cottage With Gatepiers And Boundary Wall			56°00′21″N 4°34′18″W		C(S)	43216	Upload Photo
Woodbank House With Garden Building			56°00′05″N 4°35′47″W		A	1125	Upload another image See more images
Balloch Castle, South Lodge With Boundary Walls And Gatepiers			56°00′17″N 4°34′36″W		B	43221	Upload Photo
Bonhill, Jamestown Road, Dalmonach Print And Dye Works, Lodge			55°59′21″N 4°34′21″W		C(S)	43223	Upload Photo
Tullichewan Estate, Stables Cottage			55°59′43″N 4°35′46″W		B	43230	Upload Photo
Cameron House, South Lodge With Gatepiers And Boundary Wall			56°00′16″N 4°35′55″W		B	4904	Upload Photo
Alexandria, Bank Street, Vale of Leven Bingo Club With Boundary Wall, Railings And Portals			55°59′06″N 4°34′29″W		B	43193	Upload Photo
Alexandria, 127-133, Main Street, Bank of Scotland			55°59′13″N 4°34′53″W		C(S)	43200	Upload Photo
Drumkinnon Cottage With Wall And Railings			56°00′16″N 4°35′51″W		C(S)	1124	Upload Photo

== Key ==
The scheme for classifying buildings in Scotland is:

- Category A: "buildings of national or international importance, either architectural or historic; or fine, little-altered examples of some particular period, style or building type."
- Category B: "buildings of regional or more than local importance; or major examples of some particular period, style or building type, which may have been altered."
- Category C: "buildings of local importance; lesser examples of any period, style, or building type, as originally constructed or moderately altered; and simple traditional buildings which group well with other listed buildings."

In March 2016 there were 47,288 listed buildings in Scotland. Of these, 8% were Category A, and 50% were Category B, with the remaining 42% being Category C.
