= List of listed buildings in Bonhill, Argyll and Bute =

This is a list of listed buildings in the northern part of the parish of Bonhill, which lies in Argyll and Bute, Scotland. The southern part of Bonhill parish, including Bonhill itself, is within West Dunbartonshire. See List of listed buildings in Bonhill, West Dunbartonshire.

== List ==
Name	Location	Date Listed	Grid Ref. (Note: Sometimes known as OSGB36, the grid reference (where provided) is based on the British national grid reference system used by the Ordnance Survey. • "Guide to National Grid". Ordnance Survey. • "Get-a-map". Ordnance Survey.)	Geo-coordinates	Notes	LB Number (Note: Historic Environment Scotland assign a unique alphanumeric identifier to each designated site in Scotland, for listed buildings this always begins with "LB", for example "LB12345".)	Image
Auchendennan, The Clock House And Annex				56°00′58″N 4°37′22″W	Category B	43872	Upload Photo
Lomond Castle Hotel (Formerly Auchenheglish House)				56°01′21″N 4°37′25″W	Category B	43879	Upload another image
Arden House, Lodge With Gatepiers And Boundary Wall				56°01′32″N 4°37′59″W	Category B	43869	Upload Photo
Arden Policies, Buchanan Graveyard				56°01′27″N 4°37′41″W	Category C(S)	43870	Upload Photo
Darleith Stables With Walled Garden				55°59′25″N 4°39′26″W	Category B	43876	Upload Photo
Arden House With Stables And Walled Garden				56°01′33″N 4°37′46″W	Category B	43867	Upload another image
Arden House, Gates And Gatepiers				56°01′19″N 4°37′42″W	Category B	43868	Upload another image
Darleith Kirk And Kirkyard				55°59′22″N 4°39′07″W	Category B	43875	Upload another image
Cameron House, North Lodge With Boundary Wall, Gates, Gatepiers And Railings				56°00′56″N 4°36′38″W	Category C(S)	50280	Upload another image
Darleith Dovecot				55°59′23″N 4°39′09″W	Category A	43874	Upload another image
Lomond Castle Estate, Cottage With Boundary Wall				56°01′12″N 4°37′55″W	Category C(S)	43878	Upload another image
Lomond Castle Hotel, Walled Garden				56°01′23″N 4°37′33″W	Category C(S)	43881	Upload Photo
Auchendennan House With Conservatory, Terrace Wall, Fountain, Statury				56°00′59″N 4°37′09″W	Category A	43871	Upload another image
Lomond Castle Hotel, Formerly Aughenheglish, Lodge With Gatepiers And Railings				56°01′15″N 4°37′15″W	Category B	43880	Upload another image
Darleith House				55°59′25″N 4°39′16″W	Category B	43873	Upload another image
Duck Bay, Watersedge Cottage With Boundary Wall				56°01′05″N 4°36′52″W	Category C(S)	43877	Upload another image

== Key ==
The scheme for classifying buildings in Scotland is:

- Category A: "buildings of national or international importance, either architectural or historic; or fine, little-altered examples of some particular period, style or building type."
- Category B: "buildings of regional or more than local importance; or major examples of some particular period, style or building type, which may have been altered."
- Category C: "buildings of local importance; lesser examples of any period, style, or building type, as originally constructed or moderately altered; and simple traditional buildings which group well with other listed buildings."

In March 2016 there were 47,288 listed buildings in Scotland. Of these, 8% were Category A, and 50% were Category B, with the remaining 42% being Category C.

== See also ==
- List of listed buildings in Argyll and Bute
