= Dalmuir =

Coordinates: 55.912°N 4.431°W

Dalmuir: Scottish Gaelic: Dail Mhoire
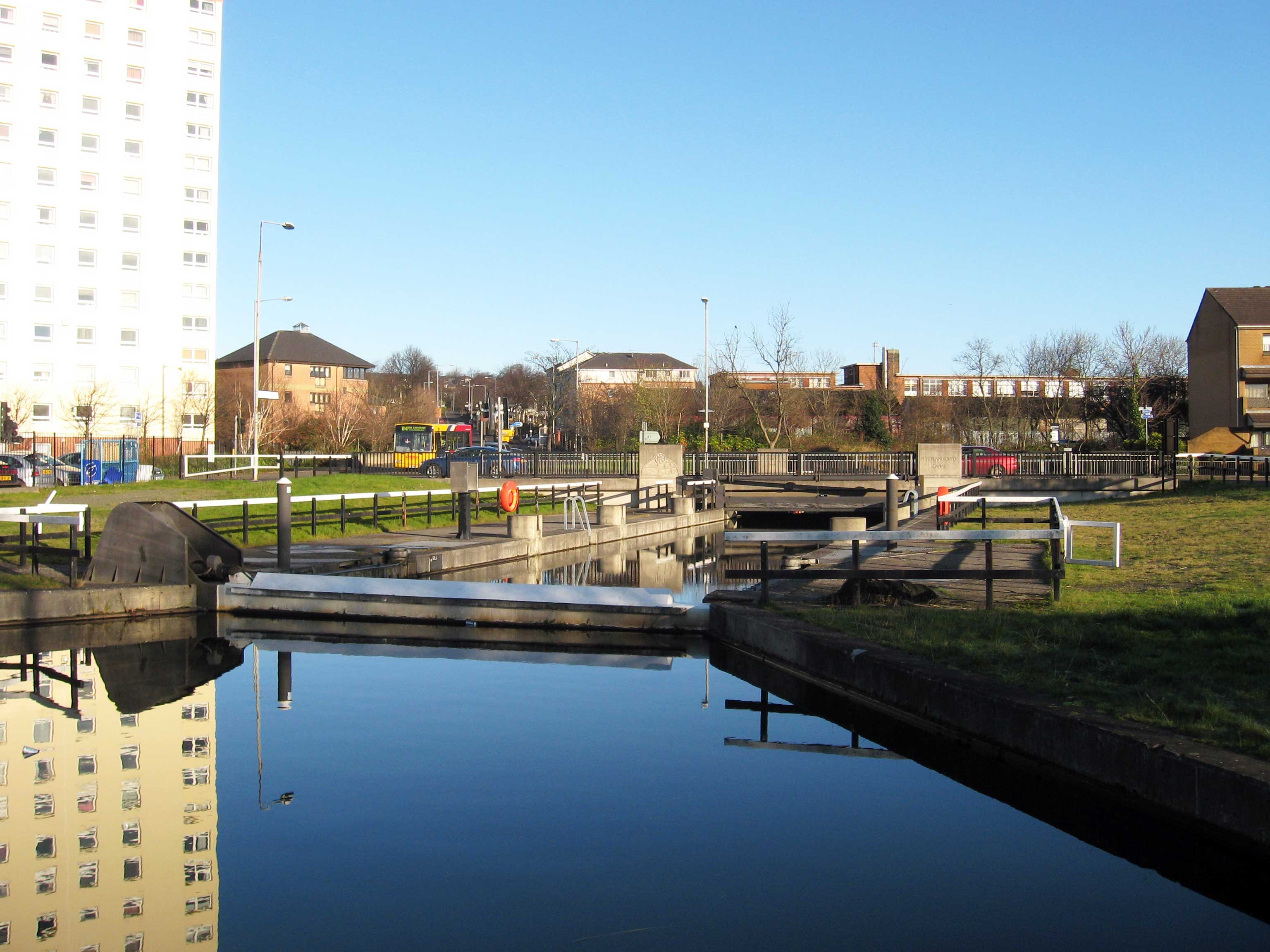
- The Dalmuir drop lock is the first of its type, allowing boats on the Forth and Clyde Canal to go under the Dumbarton Road without stopping traffic.

- Location within West Dunbartonshire
- OS grid reference: NS486711
- Council area: West Dunbartonshire
- Lieutenancy area: Dunbartonshire
- Country: Scotland
- Sovereign state: United Kingdom
- Post town: CLYDEBANK
- Postcode district: G81
- Dialling code: 0141
- Police: Scotland
- Fire: Scottish
- Ambulance: Scottish
- UK Parliament: West Dunbartonshire
- Scottish Parliament: Clydebank and Milngavie

Dalmuir (/dælˈmjʊər/; Scottish Gaelic: Dail Mhoire) is an area nine miles (fourteen kilometres) northwest of Glasgow, Scotland, on the western side of Clydebank, and part of West Dunbartonshire Council Area. The name is a lowland Scots derivation of the Gaelic meaning Big Field. The area was originally two separate villages with Dalmuir Shore joining with Clydebank in 1886 and Dalmuir Village in 1906, during a period of rapid industrialisation and expansion. Dalmuir is bounded by the village of Old Kilpatrick to the west, the Mountblow and Parkhall housing schemes to the north, and the Clydebank town centre area to the east. To the south is the River Clyde.

== Geography ==
Dalmuir is situated mostly on the alluvial plains of the River Clyde, south of the former volcanic Kilpatrick Hills. The Kilpatrick Hills are a part of the Clyde Plateau Lavas. Near the west boundary is Duntocher Burn running down to the Clyde from the high ground that forms the north perimeter of the area.

== Transport ==
The area was initially accessed from the River Clyde via an old quay for loading and landing goods at Dalmuir Shore, the current location of the Golden Jubilee Hospital. Prior to 1790, Bridge Street ran from Dalmuir Shore directly to Dumbarton Road.

The main thoroughfare through the village is Dumbarton Road that was originally a toll road from Yoker Bridge to Old Kilpatrick and onto Dumbarton. In 1777, there was a second road from approximately Duntocher Road connected Boquhanran and Kilbowie to the north-east running along the current Second Avenue. On the Auchentoshan Estate lands to the north was the old Roman Road and predecessor route of the Great Western Road

The Forth & Clyde Company Act 1768 authorised the establishment of a company to construct the Forth and Clyde Canal starting "at or near a place called Dalmuir Burnfoot, in the county of Dumbarton". With an initial investment by Sir Lawrence Dundas, 1st Baronet, the canal was completed on 28 July 1790. Two narrow timber double-leaved bascule bridges were located at Dumbarton Road and at Dalmuir Farm next to the Duntocher Burn. The bridge at Dumbarton Road was replaced with a swing bridge in 1915 and in 2010 by the only drop lock in Europe, as part of the canal's revival and re-opening.

The railway arrived in 1858 with the opening of the Glasgow, Dumbarton and Helensburgh Railway linking Queen Street Station Glasgow with the Caledonian and Dumbartonshire Junction Railway at Bowling. The station was originally located at Park Road until it was relocated in 1897 to its current location creating two more platforms as part of the extension to Dalmuir of the Glasgow, Yoker and Clydebank Railway. A fifth platform was added as part of the Argyle Line expansion in 1979. Dalmuir railway station was briefly renamed Dalmuir Park in 1952 until 1973 and is now part of the North Clyde Line. The area previously had a second station, Dalmuir Riverside, built by the Lanarkshire and Dumbartonshire Railway, which operated from 1896 until 1966, primarily serving the William Beardmore Shipyard area. Joshua Heywood Collins of Kelvindale, the son of the last paper mill owner was the Chairman of the Lanarkshire and Dumbartonshire Railway who cut the ceremonial first sod on 6 October 1891 at Maryhill for the railways ground breaking.

Dalmuir was also served by Glasgow street trams from 1904 but terminating at the canal until the construction of the swing bridge in 1915 extended the route to a new terminus at Dalmuir West. Starting from the other side of the canal bridge, a service from Dalmuir to Bonhill in Dumbarton ran from 1908 to 1928. Until 1915, passengers traveling by tram from Glasgow to Dumbarton had to change trams and walk across the bascule bridge at Dumbarton Road. Watched by a crowd of 200,000, the last Glasgow tram left Dalmuir West Terminus on 4 September 1962. The journey was featured in the film, 'Nine Dalmuir West' - A Record of the Last Weekend of the Glasgow Trams. The No 9 Dalmuir to Auchenshuggle service was replaced by the number 64 bus.

== Demographics ==
The Dalmuir and Mountblow community council area in West Dunbartonshire has a population of 8,933. The overall population in Dalmuir and Mountblow reduced by 7% between 2001 and 2014, with the largest decrease being in the number of 16 to 44 year olds, for whom the population reduced by 15%. Male life expectancy is 73.7 years and female life expectancy 75.0 Years. Although life expectancy for males has risen by 6 years in the 14 years since 1997 and female life expectancy risen by 1 year, it has remained below the West Dunbartonshire and Scottish average.

The proportion of the population aged 0–15 is 18%; 16-64 is 65%; 65-74 is 8% and 75 and over is 9% (13% higher than in West Dunbartonshire as a whole). Black and minority ethnic groups represent 1% of the population. Owner-occupied households is 44%; privately rented households 4% and Council rented households 52%. People in employment is 59%; 22% are claiming out of work benefits and income deprivation levels are at 21% with children in poverty at 24%. Youth unemployment is 39%

== Religion ==
People with religious affiliation represent 64% of the population in the Dalmuir and Mountblow community council area.

=== Dalmuir Barclay Church ===
Dalmuir Barclay Church is a congregation of the Church of Scotland, located in the Dalmuir area of Clydebank, a town in West Dunbartonshire, Scotland.

St Stephen's Church
- St Stephen's Church
- Denomination: Roman Catholic
- Website: St Stephen's home page

Administration
- Diocese: Diocese of Glasgow
- Parish: Dalmuir

Clergy
- Priest: Fr. Aidan Martin

=== St Stephen's Church ===
St Stephen's Church is a Roman Catholic church, established in 1907. The original church was destroyed in the Clydebank Blitz and the magnificent new structure, with its prominent bell tower, which opened on 28 September 1958, was designed by the architect Thomas Cordiner.

== Education ==
Dalmuir and Mountblow has a similar proportion of adults with qualifications at Higher level or above to West Dunbartonshire at 41%. Youths not in employment, education and training is 39%.

=== Clydemuir Primary ===
A non-denominational primary school, opened in 1976, is located on Ottawa Crescent and has a current pupil roll of 246

=== Our Lady of Loretto Primary ===
A Catholic primary school, opened in 1974 is located on Castle Square and has a current pupil roll of 225

=== St Stephen's Primary ===
A Catholic Primary School, the building was replaced in 2001 and is located on Second Avenue with a current pupil roll of 251

=== Dalmuir Public Schools (closed) ===
The school was originally opened in 1873 as a temporary measure, until a new school was to be built on Kilbowie road in Clydebank. Due to local resistance, and the support of the Scotch Education Department, the transfer of Dalmuir pupils did not occur. Instead a former Masonic Lodge on what is now Beadmore Street was used until a purpose built school was completed on Auld Street in 1886.

In 1908 a new school was opened on Duntocher Road on the corner of Singer Road. Later a junior Secondary School was added. In 1962 the school was destroyed by fire and a new primary School built to the east along Singer Road. Dalmuir primary was one of the largest schools in the UK with a pupil roll of 1200. Dick McGregor (1926–2017), President of the teaching union the Educational Institute of Scotland (EIS), was head teacher for many years until his retirement in 1988. Dalmuir Primary school closed in 1993, torn down and replaced by Hill View Nursing Home. Only the former janitor's cottage remains.

The remaining Dalmuir Secondary had previously been closed in 1971, when Clydebank High School became a comprehensive. The buildings are now the Dalmuir Community Centre.

== Recreation and leisure ==
=== Cinema ===
Dalmuir's only purpose built cinema, the Regal on Dumbarton Road, opened in 1916 by owners Dalmuir Cinema House. Originally it only showed silent films and was closed in 1966.

=== Dalmuir Park ===
Opened in 1906 and originally named Overtoun Park, it consists of 7 hectares (17 acres) of landscaped and open space with a golf course, bowling green, tennis courts and children's play areas. The park has main entrances at Mountblow and Overtoun Road and originally a level crossing at the original Collins Mill access close to the Beardmore tenements and Dalmuir Village. The replacement underpass tunnel was added in 1907, which gave access to the grounds of Dalmuir House, which were incorporated into the Park in 1908. The park went under a renovation in 2013.

A municipal golf course is located at the north end of Dalmuir Park on Overtoun Road. The course is a highly rated municipal owned 18 hole course, 5349 in length and a par of 68. There is a bowling club, Dalmuir Bowling Club on Stevenson Street that was founded in 1883.

=== Dalmuir Square ===
Dalmuir Square is an open space created in the late 1970s after demolition of the Beardmore tenements on Dumbarton Road between Swindon and Dunn Streets. It is the centre of retail and community facilities and also serves as a transport hub. The square is surrounded by the main shopping stores, community cafe and public library. In 2017 revitalisation work commenced to create a town square with the addition of a play area, landscaping, local cultural information, seating, lighting and signage.

== History ==
The area was at the most northerly-west part of the Roman Empire with Antonine Wall forts to the west at Old Kilpatrick and north at Duntocher from AD 142 until it was abandoned in AD 162. There was a brief re-occupation for a few years, starting in AD 208. In 1281 the land was first recorded as owned by Walter Spreul, Steward of Malcolm, Earl of Levenax, in the "Charter Records of the land of Dalmuir or Dalmore". From the 13th to the early 19th century the land was held by the Spreull family.

In the 1750s the area was called Damur or Dalmar and in 1768, Dalmuir Burnfoot.

In the 18th century the area was mostly arable land, undivided moor capable of grazing 266 sheep, with a small mansion, near the Duntocher Burn, called "Dallmuir House" Owner of the Duntocher Mill, Faifley Mill, and the Mountblow lands, William Dunn, purchased the Dalmuir lands in 1828. To the west was Dalmuir Farm and the two Buchanran farms to the east.

In addition to the original Dallmuir House and estate, to the north were the estates of Auchentoshan and Mountblow. Auchentoshan Estate was owned by James Hamilton, Earl of Abercorn until 1612. Auchintoshan House, built in the 17th century, was destroyed in the Clydebank Blitz in March 1941. One of the last residents was Sir Thomas Bell, managing director of John Brown & Co. Originally 24 acres of the Auchentoshan Estate, the Mountblow Estate was created in 1767 and Mountblow House built by Robert Donald, a tobacco merchant. The house was also destroyed in the Clydebank Blitz in March 1941.

=== Dalmuir Glen ===
The first industrialisation was the paper mill opened in 1747 by Edward Collins. Originally from Shropshire, he moved to Scotland in 1745, initially setting up a paper mill in Kelvindale. He died in January 1784. Powered by the Duntocher Burn at Dalmuir Glen, the water was diverted through the Mill Lade to the High Dam to provide power to the mill's Upper Works. High Dam was later converted to Overtoun Park's duck pond. Thatched whitewashed stone cottages for workers grew around the mills along Dumbarton Road, creating the village of Dalmuir. By the 1790s the statistical account records the paper mill as the fourth or fifth largest in Scotland. Also in 1790 the Forth and Clyde Canal opened. The mill was run by Edward Collin's son, Richard Collins born in Dalmuir in 1752 who died in March 1822, then his son Edward Collins born September 1794, who died in July 1864. Edward Collins set up a steam-powered mill in Kelvindale in 1840.

In 1845, the Dalmuir paper mill employed 180 persons (63 men, 91 women, 17 boys and 5 girls) and paying 10,000 in tax per year. The Collins mill closed in 1857 and manufacturing and workers were moved to the Kelvindale factory, however a calico print works continued until the early 20th century. In 1882 The Gazetteer of Scotland, by Rev. John Wilson, described the village -

"DALMUIR, village, 6 1/4 miles [10 km] east-south-east of Dumbarton. It has a post office under Glasgow, a railway station, extensive paper-works, and a public school with about 75 scholars. Pop. 936."

A proposal to incorporate Dalmuir Village into Clydebank was rejected in 1890, but eventually passed in 1906. Dalmuir Glen was later converted into Overtoun Park in 1906.

=== Dalmuir House ===
The original Dallmuir (different spelling) house existed in 1777. A new Dalmuir House, located on the hill close to the end of what is now Regent Street, was built in 1818 by paper mill owner, Richard Collins. It was originally accessed from the Collins' mill area and featured a kitchen garden and views across the River Clyde. The estate was purchased by William Dunn, then in 1908 by Clydebank Burgh Council when the grounds were incorporated into Overtoun Park. The building was demolished in 1929.

=== Dalmuir Shore ===
Dalmuir Shore, the second settlement and village in its own right, grew around a soda works established in 1800 on an existing quay by the father of Lord Dundas under the supervision of Earl of Dundonald. The Soda works produced 30 tons of sulphuric acid weekly as well chloride of lime and oil of vitriol, employing nearly 100 people, all male working two 12 hour shifts each day for 11s per week. It had an unsightly appearance with low blackened range of buildings facing the Clyde. The village closed in 1859.

The Clyde Navigation Trust became responsible for dredging and maintaining the river as a result of the Clyde Navigation Consolidation Act 1858 (21 & 22 Vict. c. cxlix). Around 1860 the Trust enlarged the old quay at Dalmuir Shore and developed the surrounding 8 acres for workshops to maintain their dredging equipment.

In 1886 the Dalmuir Shore area, was incorporated into the new Clydebank Police Burgh. Lanarkshire and Dumbartonshire Railway, opened the Dalmuir Riverside railway station in 1896. Dalmuir Shore was located on the north-west of the William Beardmore and Company site and now part of the Golden Jubilee Hospital grounds.

=== William Beardmore and Company ===
In 1900, William Beardmore began construction at Dalmuir Shore of what would become The Naval Construction Yard and the largest and most advanced shipyard in the United Kingdom at the time. Notable warships produced included HMS Agammemnom, dreadnoughts HMS Conqueror and aircraft carrier HMS Argus. Beardmore expanded the activities at Dalmuir to include the manufacture of a variety of arms, armaments, aircraft, airships, motor cars, taxis and tanks. The site employed 13,000 people at its peak, resulting in rapid housing expansion along Dumbarton Road.

The post war recession hit the firm hard, and the shipyard was forced to close in 1930. Part of the site and some of the existing buildings later became incorporated into ROF Dalmuir in 1939, part was used by the General Post Office for their cable-laying ships. The site was sold to Babcock & Wilcox in 1957 until 1969. During the 1970s the site was converted into the Clydebank Industrial Estate and in recent years has also formed the location of the Golden Jubilee Hospital and the Beardmore Hotel.

=== Overtoun Park ===
The old Collins' paper works at Dalmuir Glen was converted into a public park, with the High Dam made into a duck pond and the upper works forming the park's flower gardens. It was opened in 1906 as Overtoun Park, named after local businessman and philanthropist Lord Overtoun, who gifted the £5,000 required to purchase the land from Mr W P Macindoe, a descendant of William Dunn (he also made a similar donation for a park of the same name in his birthplace of Rutherglen around the same time). The land around Dalmuir House was incorporated in 1908 to form the east part of the park.

=== Dalmuir Farm ===
Located west of the Duntocher Burn, north of the Forth and Clyde Canal, Dalmuir Farm existed until the 1920s. In 1882, Robert Renwick was the farmer and in 1904, John Filshie. The Dalmuir West tram terminus was constructed in 1915. Clydebank's boundary was extended to include Dalmuir West in 1925 and the first phase of the Council-built Mountblow housing scheme north of Dumbarton Road was completed in 1933. After the war, pre-fab houses were added to the south of Dumbarton Road and were replaced in 1970 by the white house scheme. Locally called the Coosie, the field to the west of the scheme formerly contained a curling pond. The tram terminus was demolished in the early 1970s.

=== Housing expansion ===
Workers housing was constructed to meet the demands of industrial development. Initially for mill workers in the late 18th century, cottages were located on Dumbarton Road that eventually formed Dalmuir Village around the current Burns Street location and bottom of Mountblow Road. The Post Office and housing clustered further east along Dumbarton Road, either side of the Canal bridge. After the demolition of Dalmuir Shore in 1860, Clyde Navigation Trust constructed workers tenements further east along Dumbarton Road at Nairn and Boquhanrans Streets. The Dalmuir Co-operative constructed tenements on the other side of Dumbarton Road around Gladstone Street.

The Crescent was a semi circular three storey tenement located at Dalmuir Station built as a speculative development and financed by the City of Glasgow Bank until it collapsed in October 1878. It was not completed and eventually destroyed in the 1941 Clydebank Blitz. Higher end villas were constructed in the late 19th century on the Hill, in the area now called High Dalmuir, around Duntocher Road. Approximately 15 large detached 2 storey villas with large gardens were constructed along with more modest homes.

William Beardmore purchased several of the High Dalmuir villas for their management, particularly at Regent Street and Duntocher Road. After 1900, Dalmuir & West of Scotland Estates Co, owned by Beardmore, constructed and managed 110 four-storey tenements, completing the expansion west to Mountblow Road for workers and east to Agamemnon Street, which housed foremen.

The Mountblow estate north of Dumbarton Road was completed in 1933. Prefabs were constructed on the south of Dumbarton road at Dalmuir Farm and Dunn Street after the war. High rise residential towers were built starting in 1954 with Mountblow House and eleven residential hi-rises were completed by the end of the 1960s. The whitehouses, built to replace the prefabs at Dalmuir west, were completed in the early 1070s. Infill housing in blitz gaps between tenements were completed along Dumbarton Road in the 1980s. Further infill development between tenements on blitz gaps continued in the 1990s and then private modern terraced houses built in former industrial land to the east at Benbow road and Caledonia Street were built after 2000.

== Notable figures ==
- John Baird I (1798–1859), architect, worked on numerous buildings in Glasgow and around Scotland
- Duncan Bannatyne (born 1949), entrepreneur, philanthropist and author
- William Beardmore, 1st Baron Invernairn (1856–1936), Anglo-Scottish industrialist, founder of William Beardmore and Company
- James Cosmo (born 1947), film and television actor
- William Dunn (1770–1849), agriculturist, mechanic, and mill owner
- Bella Lappin, councillor and rent strike activist
- Ian McAteer (born 1961), former gangster
- Neil Mitchell (born 1965), keyboard player for Wet Wet Wet
- Robert Wilfred Scarff FRSE (1899–1970), pathologist
- Frederick Charles Stewart (1878–1950), electrical engineer, industrialist, and patron of the arts
