= Knock Castle, Largs =

House on west coast of Scotland

Coordinates: 55.827°N 4.886°W

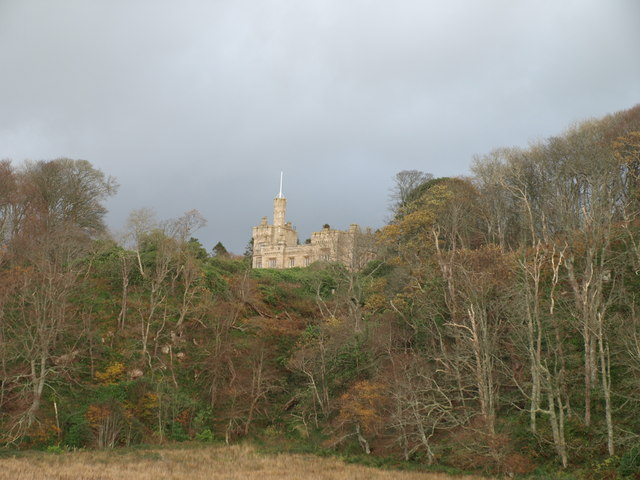
Knock Castle

Knock Castle is a private residence on the outskirts of Largs, on the west coast of Scotland. It was built by a member of the shipbuilding Steele family in 1851, with a further wing added in the early twentieth century. The restored seventeenth century Knock Old Castle is within the grounds.

== Knock Castle ==
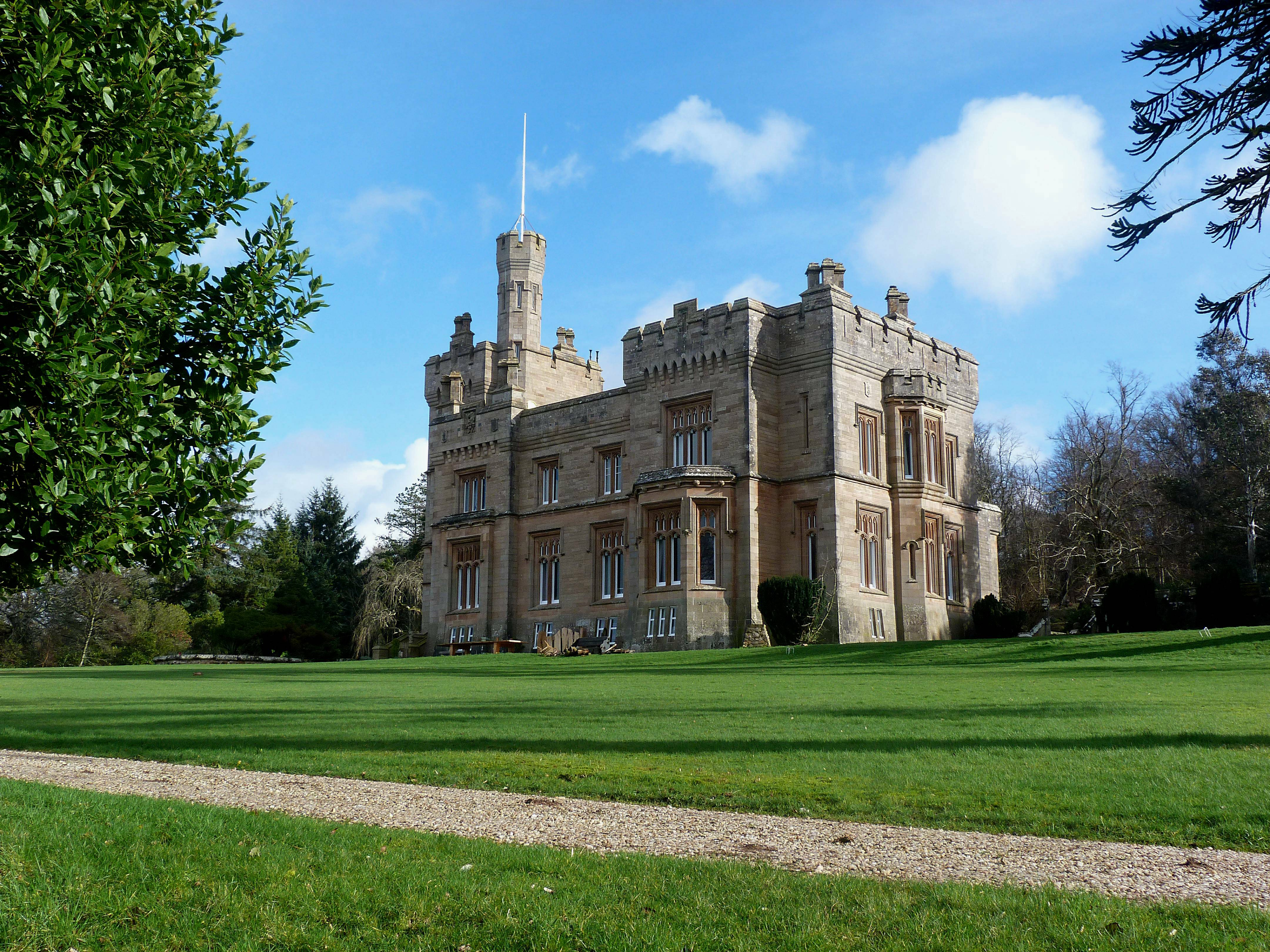
Knock Castle

The new castle was designed by J. T. Rochead and built in 1851-1852 in a castellated Tudor revival style. It was built for Robert Steele, a Greenock merchant, and his initials and crest are carved on the parapets. Around 1870 it was sold to George Elder FRSE (1816-1897), a Scottish businessman with strong links to Adelaide in Australia, who certainly owned the castle in the later 19th century, and died here in 1897. The house was then sold to Robert Hunter Craig who died there in 1913.

The castle was extended in 1908. It is a category A listed building.

== Knock Old Castle ==
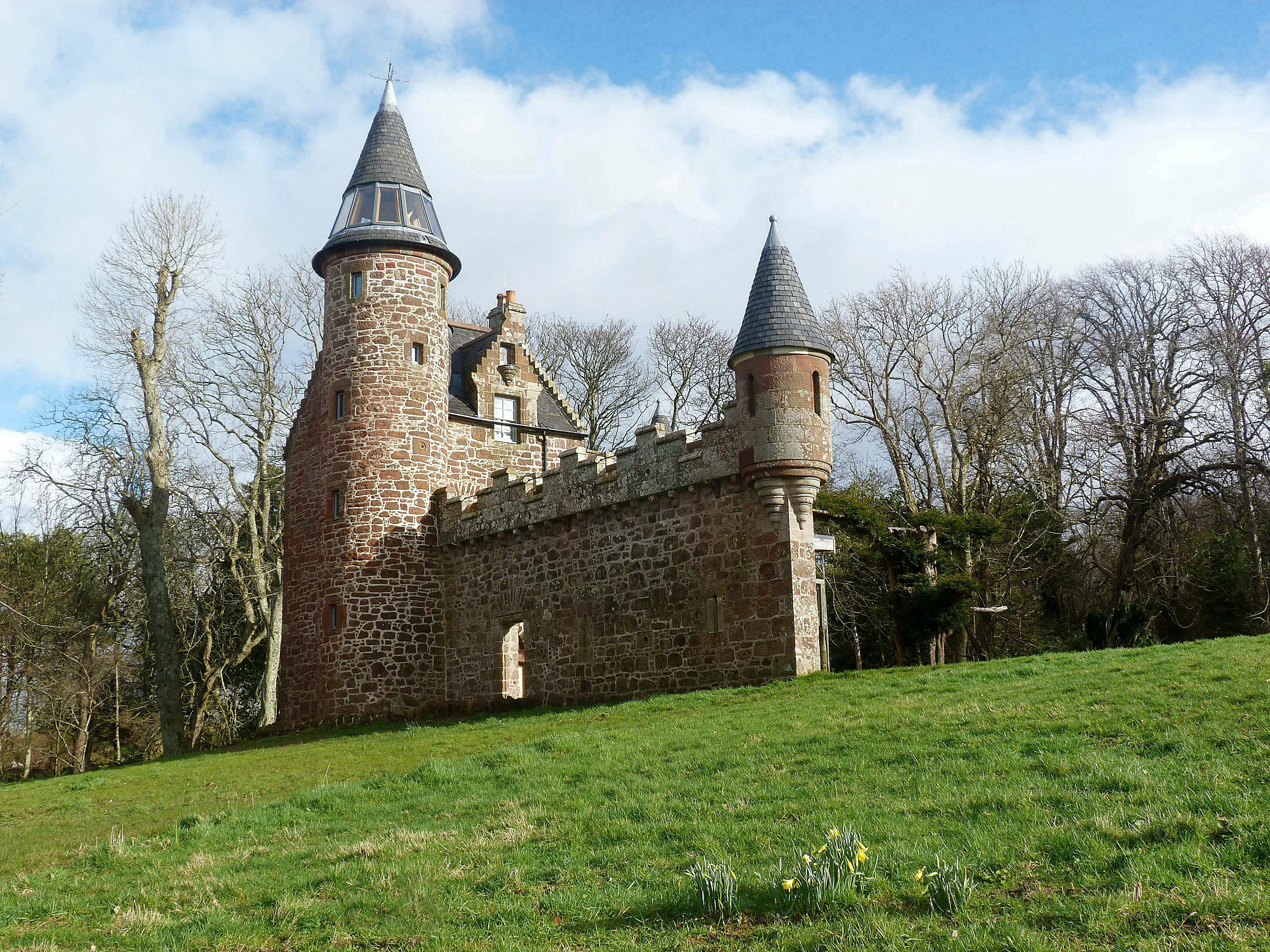
Knock Old Castle

Knock Old Castle was mentioned by the cartographer Timothy Pont in about 1608. The remains of this small mansion or castle stand on the edge of a stream with an extensive view to the west over Arran and Bute. It consisted of a rectangular block, with a round tower at the south-west angle, and the remains of another at the north-east angle. The latter is about 3 metres (9.8 ft) high. A courtyard wall has a door in it, and it is possible that buildings abutted this.

A modern parapet with angle turret surmounts this wall, which bears a stone inscribed "Repaired in 1853." This restoration is recorded as being by John Thomas Rochead. This wall also contains stones (not in situ) dated '1603' and '1604', the initials 'I B' being on the latter. The whole building has been restored and, in parts, modernised. The walls are only 0.6 metres (2.0 ft) thick. No other traces of courtyard wall are visible. Nigel Tranter gives a similar description in his The Fortified House in Scotland, and adds that Knock Castle was probably built in the late 16th or early 17th century. The old castle is a category B listed building.
