= Loch Humphrey =

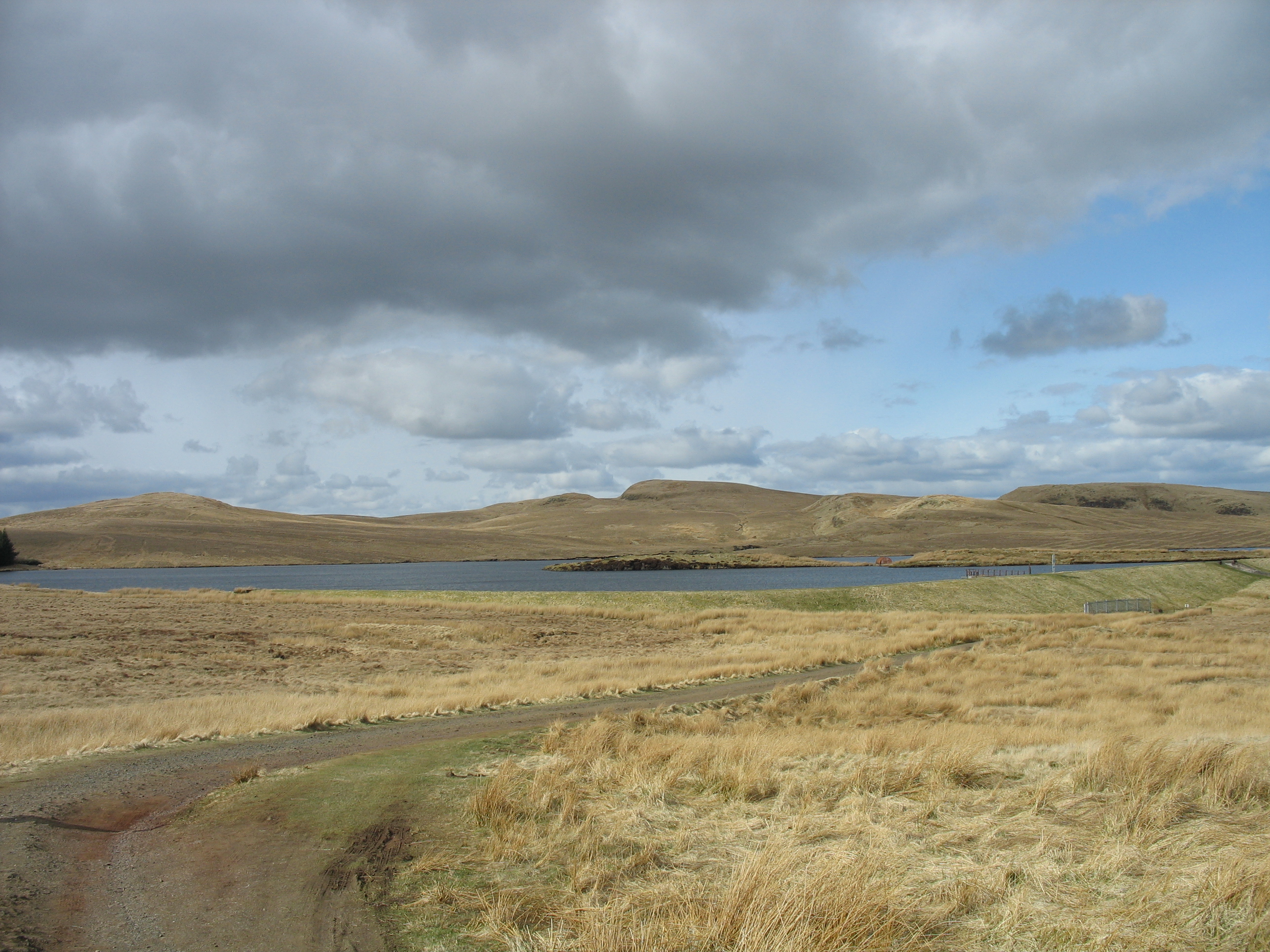

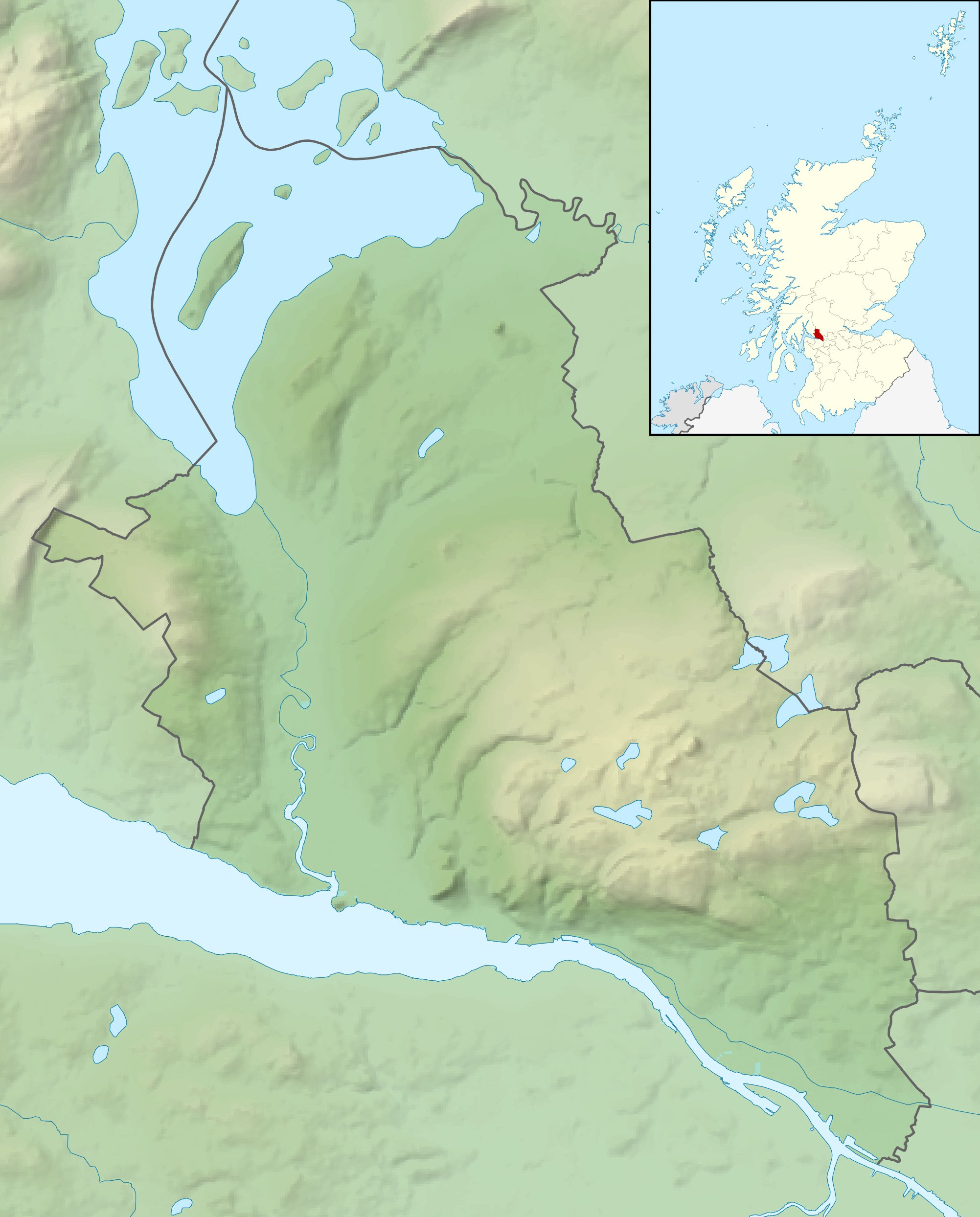
- Location within West Dunbartonshire
- Location: West Dunbartonshire, Scotland
- Coordinates: 55.952°N 4.471°W
- Type: freshwater loch
- Basin countries: United Kingdom

Loch Humphrey is a loch in West Dunbartonshire, Scotland. It is fished for mainly perch and occasional trout by members of the Bearsden Angling Club, who have a boat and a boatshed at the loch.

It is in the Kilpatrick Hills, and is close to Duncolm. It can be reached by a cart track from Old Kilpatrick; the terrain is not difficult going but it is quite a steep climb.
