= John Thomas Rochead =

Scottish architect (1814-1878)

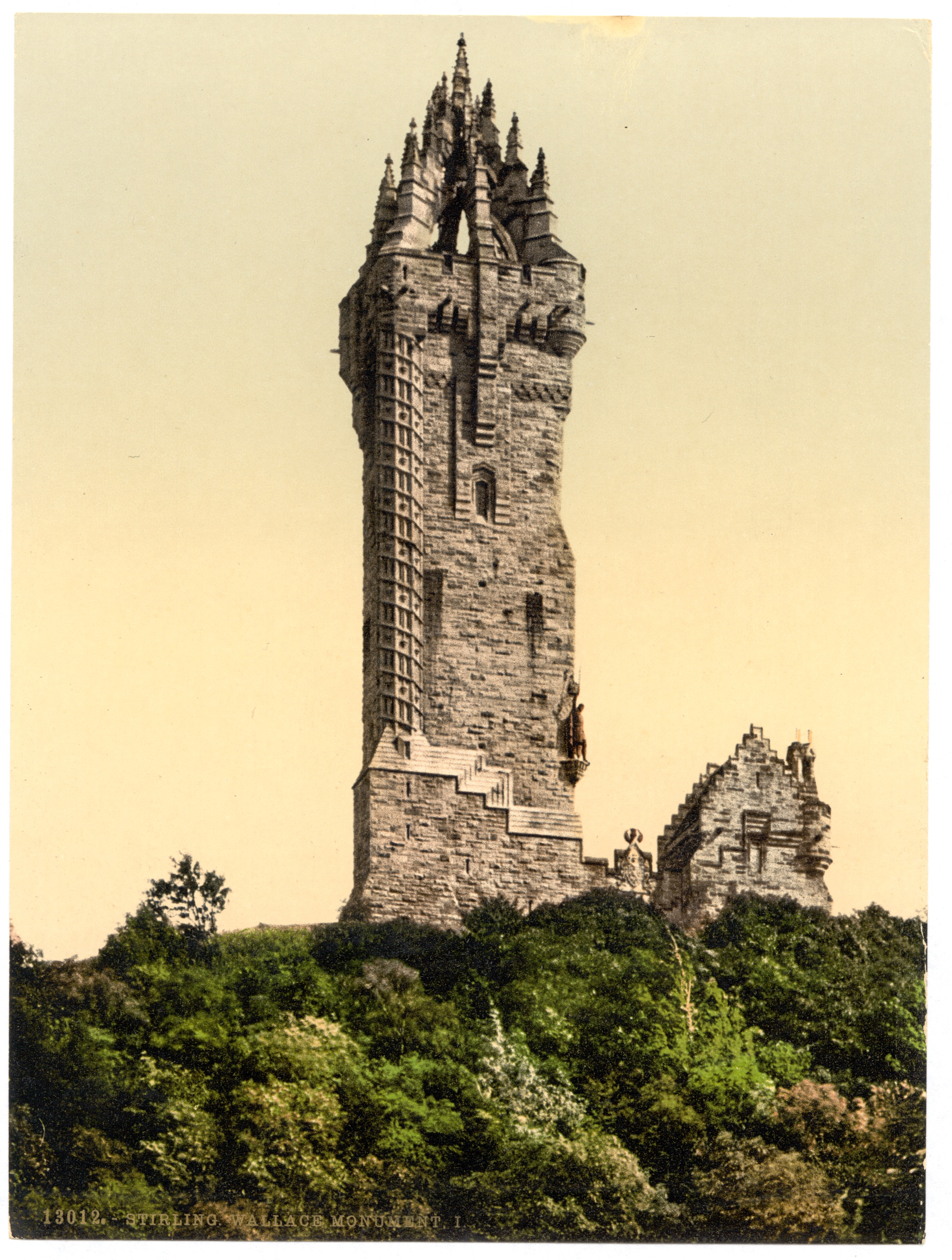
The Wallace Monument

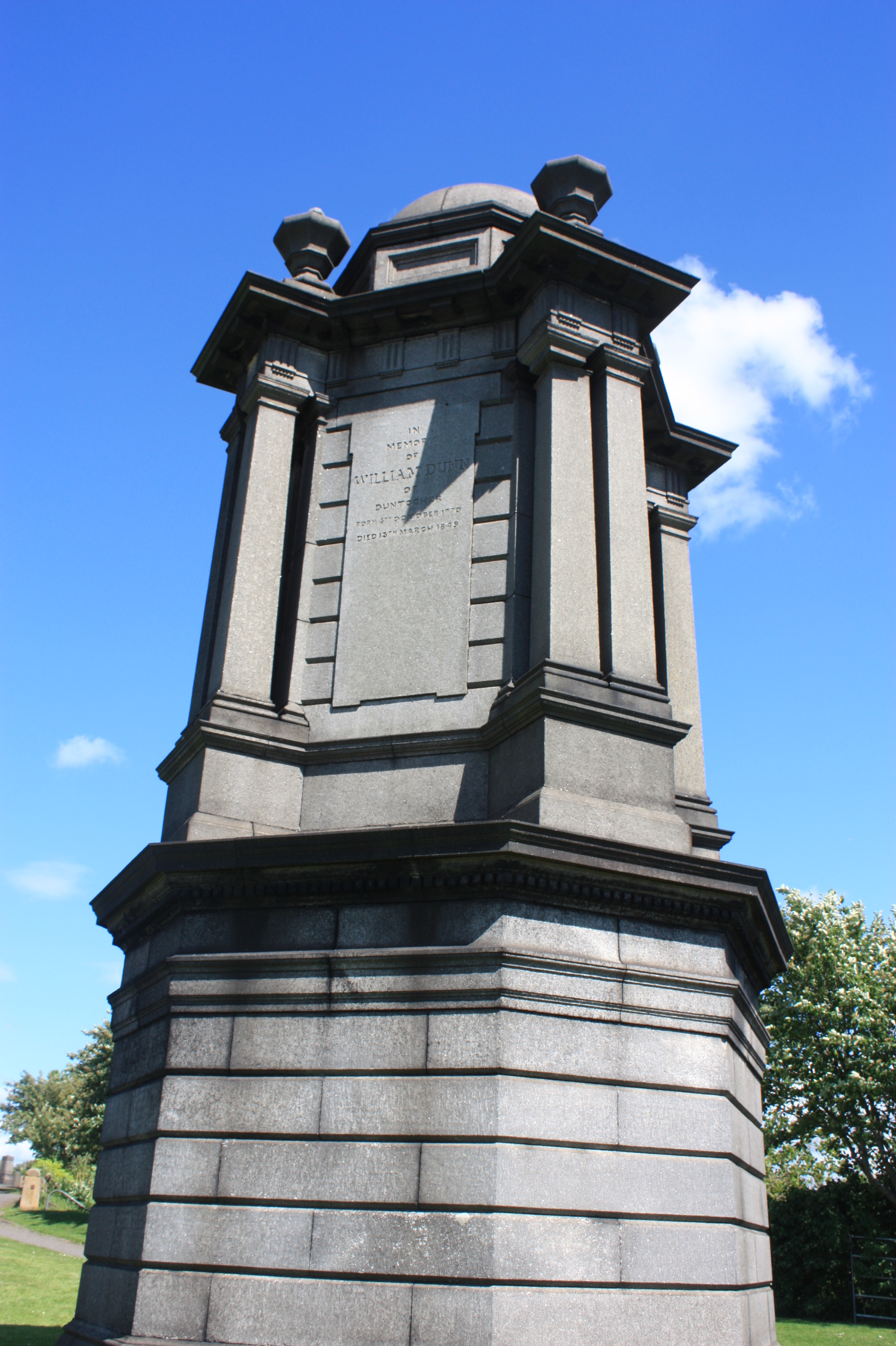
The grave of William Dunn, Glasgow Necropolis by Rochead

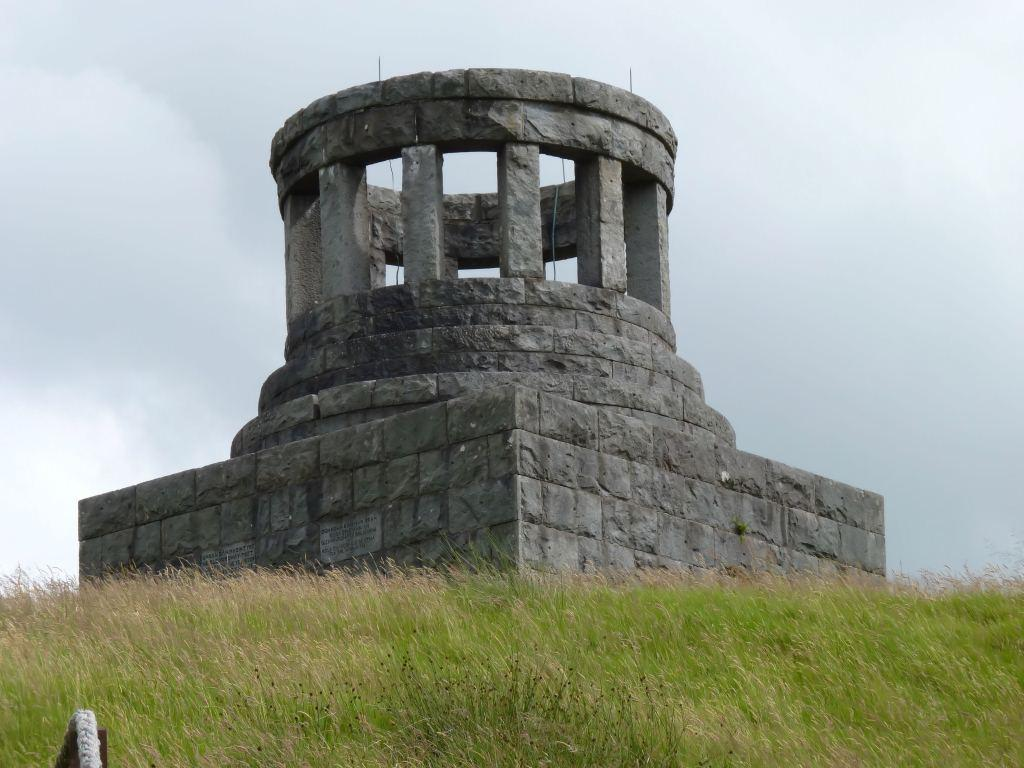
Dalmally Memorial to Duncan Ban MacIntyre

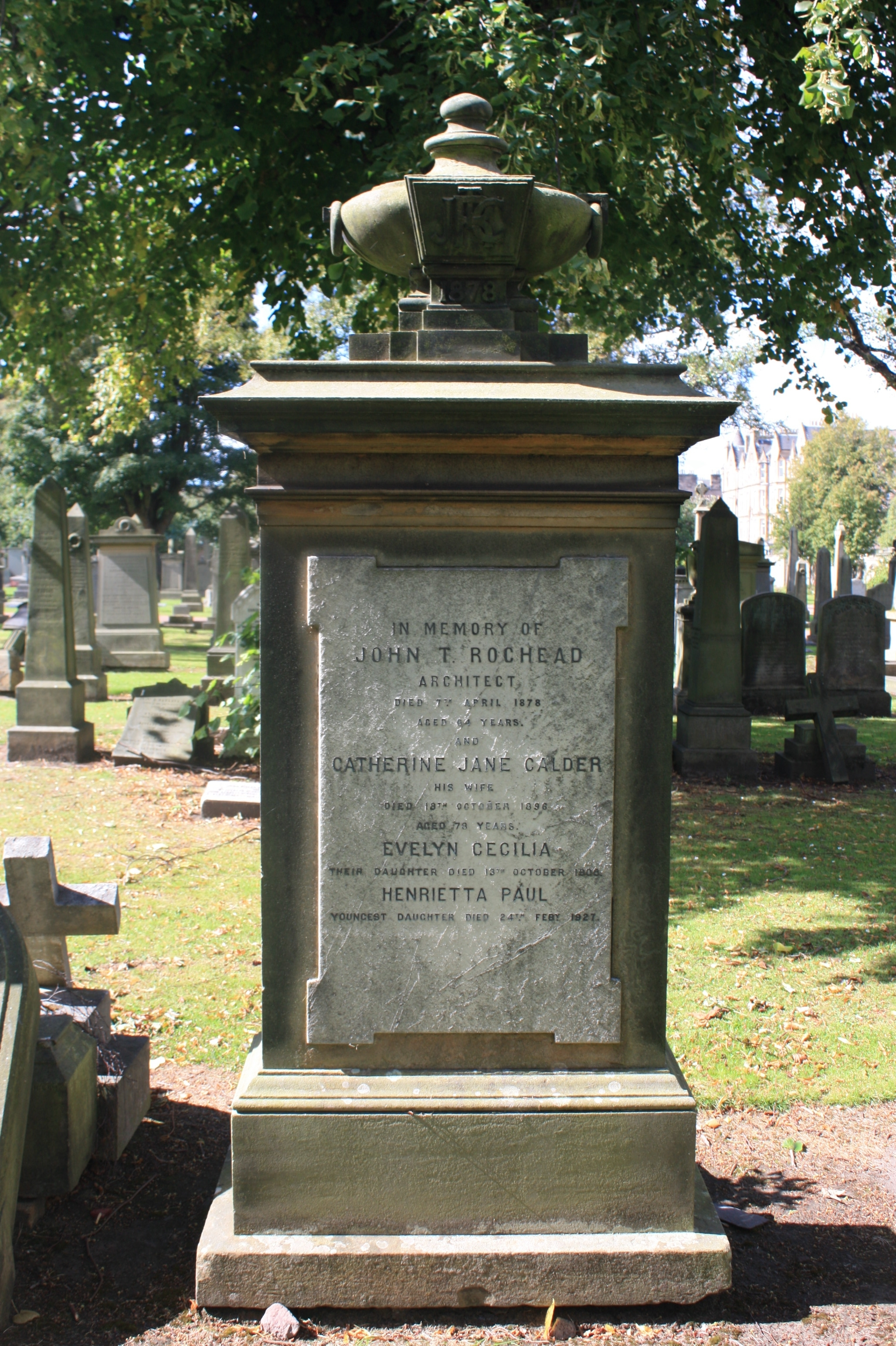
John T Rochead's grave, Grange Cemetery

John Thomas Rochead (28 March 1814 – 7 April 1878) was a Scottish architect. He is most noteworthy on a national scale for having been the designer of the Wallace Monument.

== Life ==
He was born in Edinburgh, the son of John Rochead and Catherine Gibb. He was educated at George Heriot's School.

He worked for a number of years starting in 1831, as an apprentice of the eminent Edinburgh architect, David Bryce. From around 1841 to 1870, Rochead lived and worked in Glasgow. During this time he was employed by David Hamilton, working alongside Thomas Gildard, who became a lifelong friend.

In 1840 he won a commission for a new Roman Catholic Cathedral in Belfast. Although the building went unbuilt it brought him to the attention of the architectural world and thereafter he was a keen competition architect.

In the Disruption of the Church of Scotland in 1843 Rochead received a spate of commissions for new churches for the Free Church and was therefore presumably a member of that church. In 1843 he married Catherine Jane Calder in the Gorbals in Glasgow.

In 1849 he won a competition for his design for the Royal Arch, Dundee, which was built the following year.

In 1859 he won his most important competition, that for the Wallace Monument in Stirling, which was completed in 1869. This went £5000 over budget which resulted in the bankruptcy of the contractor and Rochead never receiving his fee. His apprentices at this time included John Hutchison, who in turn trained Charles Rennie Mackintosh.

Possibly partly due to this, which caused financial difficulties and criticism when praise might have been due, Rochead suffered a nervous breakdown in 1869 and his work was taken over by John Honeyman.

Rochead lived at 19 Morningside Place in south-west Edinburgh in his final years.

== Freemasonry ==
Like his mentor and fellow architect, David Bryce, Rochead was a Scottish Freemason being Initiated in St Mark's Lodge at Glasgow, No.102, in 1856. He was also the Grand Architect of the Provincial Grand Lodge of Glasgow.

== Death ==
Rochead died suddenly of angina, in Edinburgh, and is buried in the north-east section of the Grange Cemetery, towards the north path. He was survived by his wife, Catherine Jane Calder, one son and a daughter. His widow continued to press for his unpaid fees on the Wallace Monument after his death, but to no avail. His wife and two daughters, Evelyn Cecilia (who died young) and Henrietta Paul, are buried with him.

== Principal works ==
- Western Club in Glasgow (1839)
- Adelphi Theatre, Glasgow (1842)
- Restoration and remodelling of Minard Castle, Argyllshire (1842-6)
- Free Church of St. George, Glasgow (1843)
- St Andrew's Free Church, Glasgow (1844)
- St. John's Free Church, Glasgow (1845)
- Conversion of former bazaar into St. Stephen's Free Church, Wemyss Place, Edinburgh (1847)
- Kew Terrace, Great Western Road, Glasgow (1849)
- Premises for the Buchanan Society 97-101 Trongate, Glasgow (1849)
- Royal Arch, Dundee Docks (1849)
- Temporary decorative arch for the visit of Queen Victoria, Jamaica Bridge, Glasgow (1849)
- Murdoch's Charity School, Glasgow (1850)
- Offices, 57-61 St Vincent St, Glasgow (1850)
- Blair Vaddoch House, Shandon, Dunbartonshire (1850)
- Knock Castle, Largs (1851)
- Repair of Old Knock Castle, Largs (1853)
- Levenford House, Dumbarton (1853)
- City of Glasgow Bank, corner of Trongate and Albion St, Glasgow (1854)
- Glasgow Sailors Home (Angel), Broomielaw, Glasgow (1854)
- Grosvenor Terrace, Glasgow (1855)
- City of Glasgow Bank, Greenock (1856)
- Park Parish Church, Glasgow (1856)
- Monument to Duncan Ban MacIntyre, Dalmally, Argyllshire (1858)
- Buchanan Street railway station (1858 - demolished 1967)
- Renfrew Parish Church (1861)
- Hillhead House, Hawick (1863)
- Langlands Park, Hawick (1863)
- Sillerbut Hall and Lodge, Hawick (1863-6)
- Hawick Corn Exchange (1865)
- Heronhill, Hawick (1865)
- Bank of Scotland, corner of St Vincent Place and George Square, Glasgow (1867) (completed by David Bryce)
- Aberfoyle Parish Church and Church School (1869)
- 13-19 Morningside Place, Edinburgh (1870) (19 as his own house)

== Unbuilt competition entries ==
- Roman Catholic Cathedral for Belfast (placed first) (1840)
- Free Church and Free Church Offices, Edinburgh (1844) won by David Cousin
- Manchester Assize Courts (1859)
- Wilton Parish Church, Hawick (1860)
- Scottish National Albert Memorial (1862)

== Monuments designed in the Glasgow Necropolis ==
- Rev. Thomas Brown (1847)
- William Dunn of Duntocher (1849)
- James Davidson of Ruchill (1851)
- Hugh Cogan (1855)
- Bell Mausoleum (1870)

== Sources ==
- "John Thomas Rochead". DSA Architect Biography Report. 2007. Archived from the original on 28 September 2007.
