= Hardgate =

Coordinates: 55.922°N 4.403°W

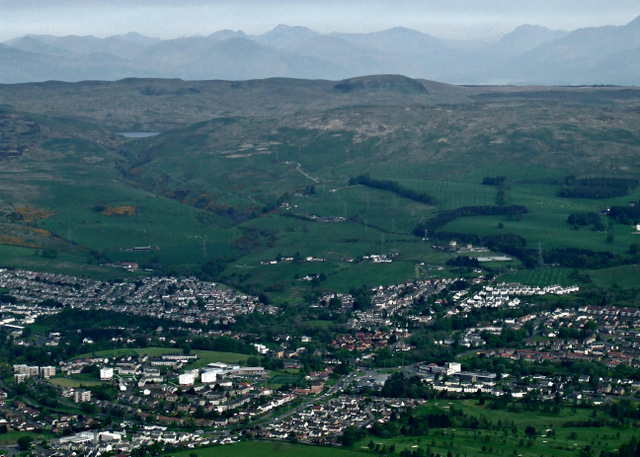
- An aerial view of the town of Hardgate

- Location within Scotland Hardgate (Scotland)
- OS grid reference: NS502725
- Lieutenancy area: Dunbartonshire
- Country: Scotland
- Sovereign state: United Kingdom
- Post town: Clyddebank
- Postcode district: G81
- Dialling code: 01389
- Police: Scotland
- Fire: Scottish
- Ambulance: Scottish
- UK Parliament: West Dunbartonshire
- Scottish Parliament: Clydebank and Milngavie

Hardgate is a village in West Dunbartonshire, Scotland.

Hardgate has probably been settled since Neolithic times with a burial site at Knappers Farm, the Cochno Stone (a cup and ring marked stone), and a burial chamber near Cochno Loch providing evidence of this.

Although it is a far older settlement, it is administratively part of nearby Clydebank along with the neighbouring village of Duntocher and now lies in the West Dunbartonshire local authority area. Along with Duntocher and Faifley, Hardgate falls within West Dunbartonshire's Kilpatrick ward with a combined population of 12,719 in 2011.

Its name comes from "hard" meaning fire, and "gate" meaning "hard path or road" in reference to Old English and Old Norse etymology.

Dunn's Mills operated a cotton mill in the 19th century. It continued to produce thread and yarn until its destruction during the Clydebank Blitz in 1941.

The village expanded due to house building by the Clydebank town council after World War II, and later by the Wimpey firm in the early 1970s on what had been green belt land.

The village has one non-denominational school, Goldenhill Primary School.
