= Robert Wilfred Scarff =

Robert Wilfred Scarff CBE FRCS FRSE (1899–1970) was a 20th-century British surgeon and pathologist.

== Life ==
He was born in Dalmuir west of Glasgow on 18 October 1899 the son of Robert William Scarff, a sea captain, and his wife, Katherine Agnes Russell, from Orkney with four brothers who were doctors. The family moved to Ilford in London in 1906 when his father got a job in Tilbury Docks. He and his two brothers were educated in the Classics at the City of London School.

He entered the Middlesex Hospital Medical SWchool in 1918 and gained a Diploma in 1924. He then entered the Bland-Sutton Institute of Pathology under the directorship of James McIntosh. Here he assisted S. L. Baker in the Department of Morbid Pathology and Histology. When Baker went to Manchester in 1931 Scarff replaced him as head of Department. The role necessitated further study to obtain a full medical degree and he then qualified MB BSc.

In 1944 (during the war) he was elected a Fellow of the Royal Society of Edinburgh. His proposers were Alan William Greenwood, Sir Edward Charles Dodds, James Edward Nichols, and Peo Charles Koller.

In 1946 he was created Professor of Morbid Pathology. In 1948 he replaced James McIntosh as Director of the Bland-Sutton Institute. In 1958 he was Secretary General of the 7th International Cancer Conference in London, and was created a Commander of the Order of the British Empire (CBE) by Queen Elizabeth II in 1960 as a consequence.

He retired in 1963 and died at Middlesex Hospital in London following a short illness on 17 January 1970. He was unmarried and had no children.
