= Faifley =

Housing estate in Clydebank, Scotland

Coordinates: 55.929719°N 4.392313°W

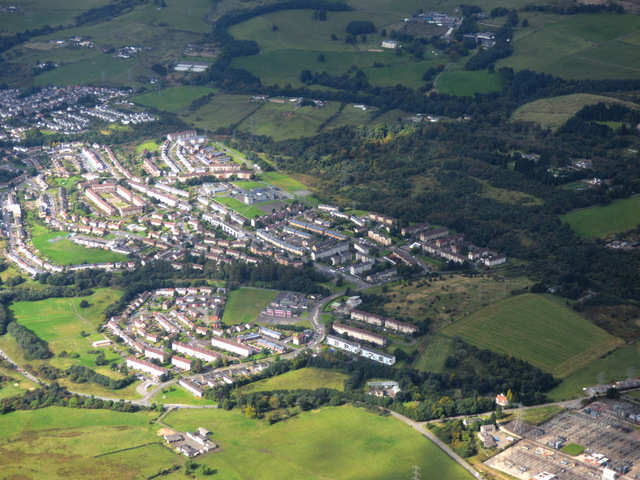
- Faifley from the air (2017)

- Location within West Dunbartonshire Faifley (West Dunbartonshire)
- Population: 4,740 (2020)
- OS grid reference: NS505567
- Council area: West Dunbartonshire
- Lieutenancy area: Dunbartonshire
- Country: Scotland
- Sovereign state: United Kingdom
- Post town: CLYDEBANK
- Postcode district: G81 5
- Dialling code: 0141/01389
- Police: Scotland
- Fire: Scottish
- Ambulance: Scottish
- UK Parliament: West Dunbartonshire
- Scottish Parliament: Clydebank and Milngavie

Faifley (Scottish Gaelic: Fionn Bhealach, IPA:[ˈfjuːn̴̪ˈvɛɫ̪əx]) is a large estate forming part of the town of Clydebank, Scotland, adjoining the former village of Hardgate, with a population of approximately 5,001. Along with Duntocher and Hardgate, Faifley falls within West Dunbartonshire's Kilpatrick ward with a combined population of 12,719 in 2011.

Faifley has in the past undergone many changes with many of the older housing removed, re-built or renovated. Faifley has two schools each with a corresponding church; Edinbarnet Primary (Non-Denominational) with the White Church and St Joseph's Primary(Roman Catholic) with St Joseph's church.

At the heart of the community until now, was "Boabs", a superstore conglomerate. The community centre also contained the Faifley Branch Library until it was closed in March 2011 by West Dunbartonshire Council. Faifley Library reopened on 6 December 2013 after a decision by West Dunbartonshire Council earlier that year. The Faifley Library is located at the rear of Edinbarnet Campus, off Craigpark Street, G81 5BS.

== History ==
=== Early history ===
In the transfers of land from the ownership from the Earls of Lennox to the Monks of Paisley Abbey in 1227 the area now called Faifley, was called Fimbalach, possibly meaning "The White Pass". In 1587 it becomes Ferchlay and by 1594, Fachla.

The name originally referred to the area around Cochno Road, north of Hardgate and between the West (or Loch Humphrey) Burn and East (or Cochno) Burn. These two burns unite at the Hardgate Mill to become the Duntocher Burn. Evidence of man's prehistoric settlement in the area was found at Auchnacraig in 1887 when the Reverend James Harvey discovered the Druid (or Cochno) Stone. This sandstone rock, some 60 feet (18 metres) in diameter, has notable "cup and ring" carvings. Smaller rocks with cup and ring marks are still visible in that area. Another prehistoric relic, the remains of the Cairnhowat burial cairn, can be seen north of the Cochno and Jaw Lochs.

The most valuable lands near Faifley were the estates of Cochno, Edinbarnet and Law. Prior to the Reformation they were, like many Kilpatrick properties, transferred from the ownership of Paisley Abbey to the Hamilton family. Andrew Hamilton, Governor of Dumbarton Castle and Provost of Glasgow, acquired Cochno in 1550 but lost it after siding with Mary, Queen of Scots at the Battle of Langside in 1568. By 1592 the Crown had restored the estates to Claud Hamilton of Cochno. The present house was built in 1757 with additions in 1842. The Hamiltons owned Cochno until 1900 when Claud Hamilton Hamilton died. The estate and farm are now managed by the University of Glasgow Veterinary School.

Edinbarnet and Law were acquired by Andrew Stirling from Stephen Spreull in 1569. The Stirling family held Edinbarnet until the estate was sold to Walter Mackenzie, who replaced the 1644 house with a new mansion in 1882. This was damaged by fire a few years later and rebuilt. Sir Robert Mackenzie inherited the estate in 1905. After his death in 1945, the house and most of the estate were sold by his son Neil to local farmer William Laird. In 1988 the house was converted into a nursing home.

=== Churches ===
Members of the congregation of Old Kilpatrick Parish Church left in 1777 to form a Burgher Secession congregation, which built a new church in 1781 at Kilpatrick Craigs at the foot of Cochno Road. The Burgher Secession congregation split again in 1799, resulting in the formation of the "auld lichts" and "new lichts", but they reunited some time after 1860 to form the Craigs and Duntocher United Free Church, worshipping at the church built by the "new lichts" at Old Street in Duntocher in 1822.

=== Industry ===
Faifley's first industries were attracted to the area by the opportunity to harness the water-power provided by the Loch Humphrey Burn and the Cochno Burn. A waulk mill (mentioned in charters of 1643) and a dye works were in existence when William Dunn (1760–1849) purchased the Faifley Cotton Spinning Co in 1811. Dunn had four large cotton mills on the burn and introduced the first steam engines at Faifley by 1836, at which time he was employing 1,400 workers. The American Civil War resulted in a collapse of Britain's cotton trade with the US in the 1860s and led to the closure of all but one of the mills.

Faifley Mill was eventually converted to a furniture factory by Glasgow manufacturer Solomon Levy Abrahams (b. Zajac from Bialystok) (understood to have been the first to introduce mechanisation to furniture making in Scotland)and became known as the "Jew's Mill". The tenement on Cochno Road at the "Conkrey Dam" was called Abrahams' Land, or "The Jew's Laun'". The manufacture of furniture was continued by J K Arthur & Co, managed by a Mr Strump. After the Second World War, the premises were occupied by Dairyority, a small company making and repairing dairy and refrigeration equipment. The last owners were the bakers MacKechnie's Rolls, employing 150 people until the bakery closed in 1991 and the old mill buildings were demolished to make way for housing.

Other small industries existed in Faifley. James Marr's Faifley Spade Forge survived on the West Burn until the 1880s. This may have been a remnant of the Dalnotter Iron Works founded a century before at Milton Mill. The mill lade can be seen behind Hillcrest Avenue. There was also a pottery and another forge on the Cochno Burn.

=== Housing ===
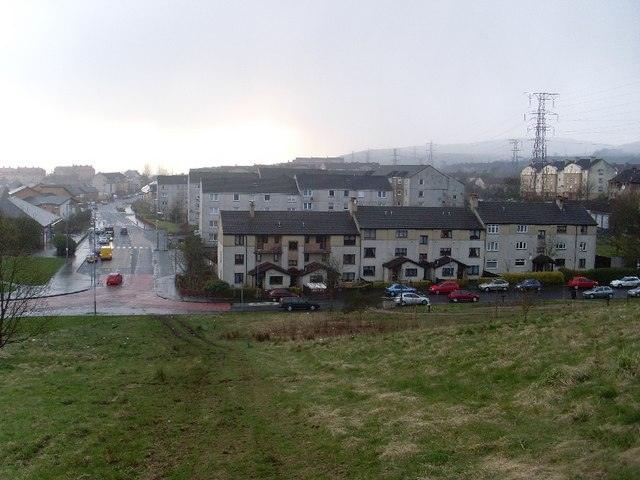
View over Faifley looking west (2008)

The Clydebank Extension Act of 1949 permitted the annexation of the Faifley area and Clydebank Town Council began work on a new housing scheme in 1953, at Auchinleck Farm to the east of the village. The Jamiesons moved their dairy herd to Dumfries and the farmhouse became part of the Doublet public house in 1963. The Council also began constructing houses nearer to Hardgate and the Scottish Special Housing Association built high-density flats and terraces on the higher ground. Many four-story properties were built using new techniques with poured concrete and eventually the housing scheme had a population of more than 9,000 people. By the time Faifley Primary School was built, there were three pupils for every seat.

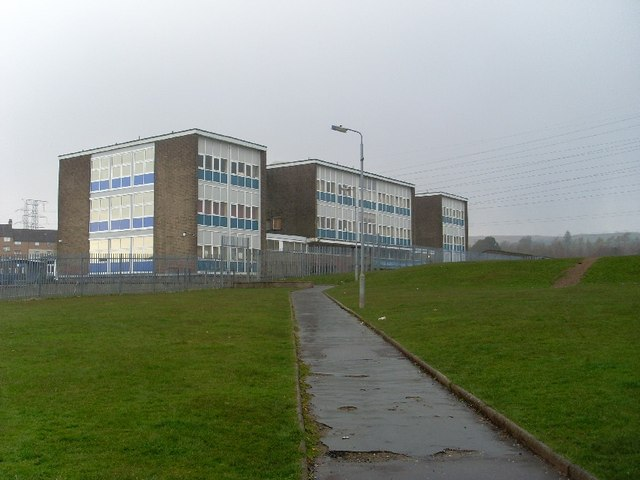
Edinbarnet Primary School

Edinbarnet Junior Secondary and Primary schools were built to the north of the scheme and the Roman Catholic school, St Joseph's Primary, built on Faifley Road. The Church of Scotland closed the Duntocher East Church in Hardgate in 1956, having built a replacement ("The White Church") on Faifley Road. A Community / Leisure centre (since demolished) was built in 1970 with aid from a German organisation as a gesture of friendship and reconciliation after the Clydebank Blitz.

=== Recent Times ===
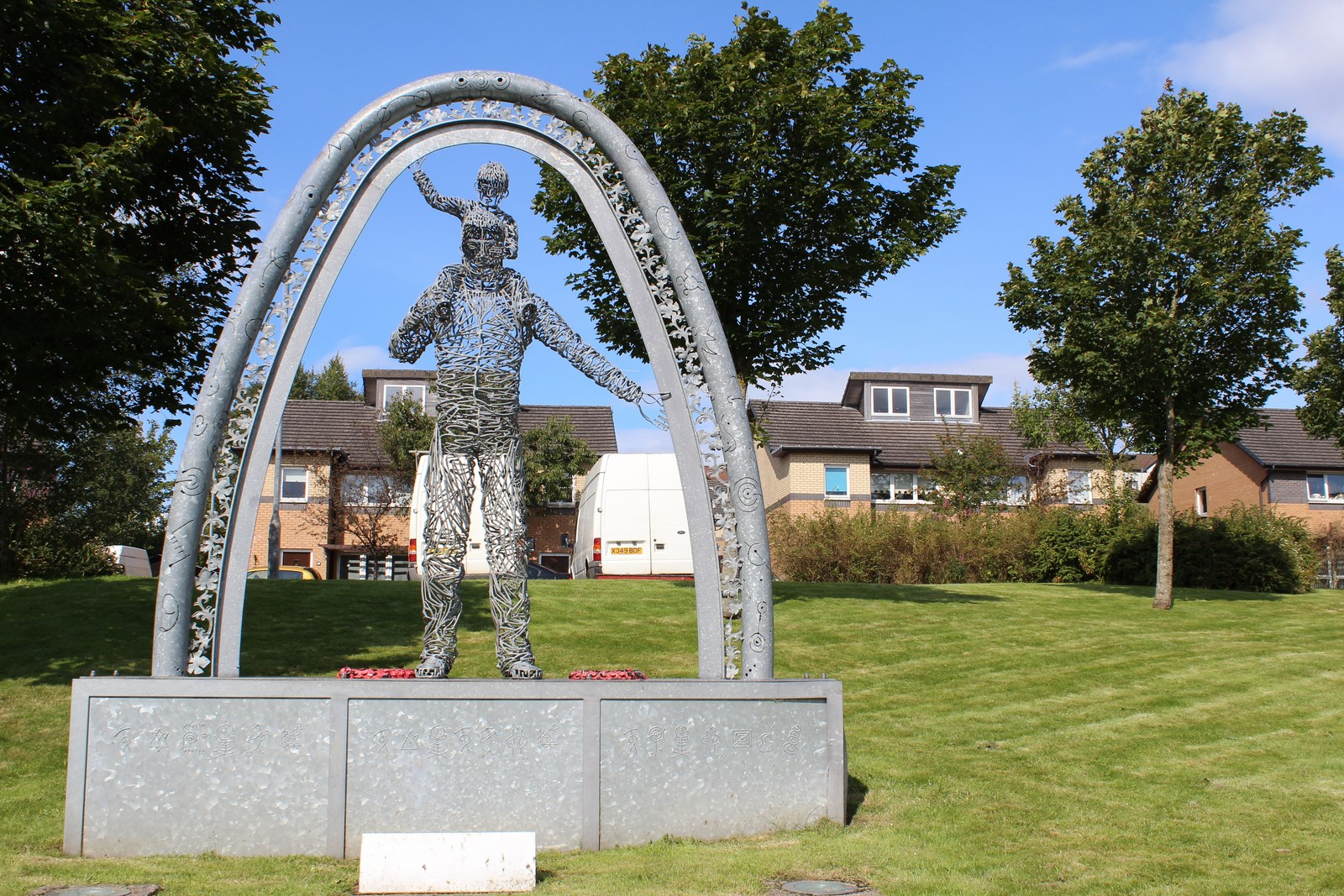
One of two "Faifley Family" statues by Andy Scott

In 1958, a deputation from the Faifley Tenants' Association lobbied the Scottish Office in Edinburgh complaining of the poor housing conditions and disparity in rents between Council and SSHA houses. The area suffered from poor amenities, remoteness and high unemployment. A Kilpatrick Ward Faifley-Hardgate-Duntocher Initiative was set up to try to resolve some of the problems. Much of the housing stock had developed faults due to poor construction methods and there have been many repair and renewal programmes. Many SSHA houses have been replaced by lower-density housing, reducing the population to about 4,000. The fall in population resulted in the closure of Faifley Primary, which in 2004 became a Library and Community Centre.
