= Duncolm =

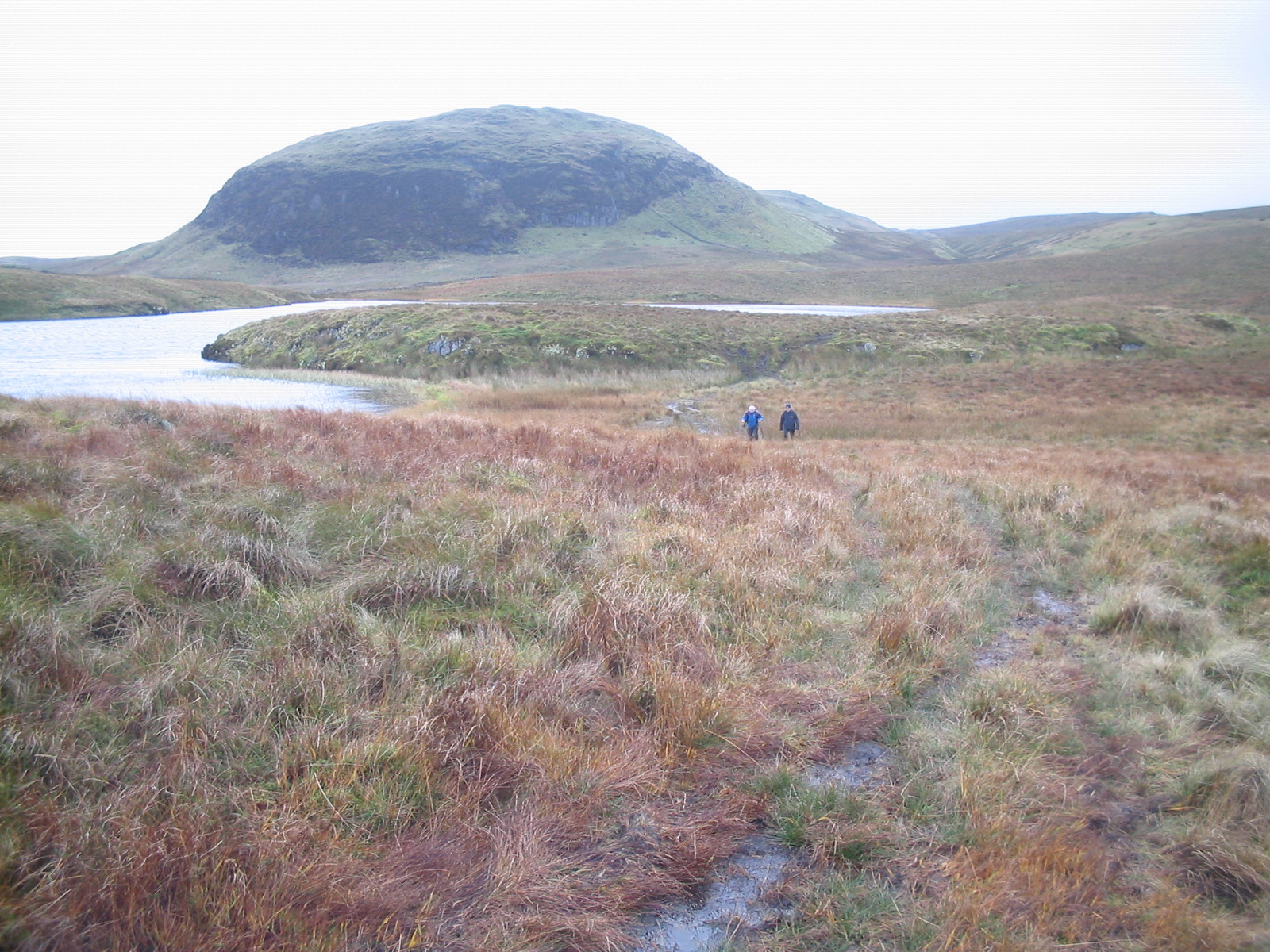
- Duncolm in Kilpatrick Hills

Highest point
- Elevation: 401 m (1,316 ft)
- Coordinates: 55.965°N 4.451°W

Geography
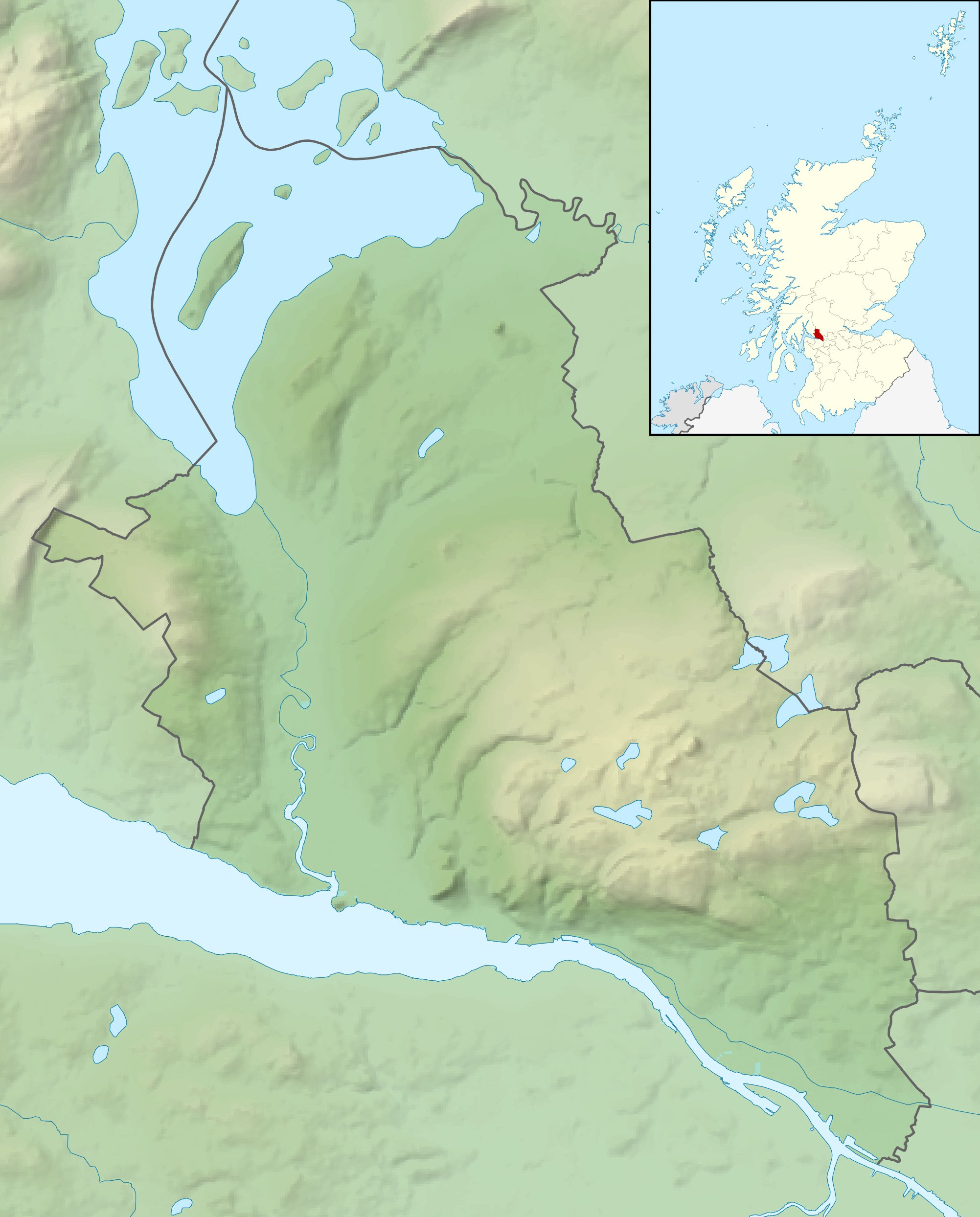
- Location within West Dunbartonshire
- Location: Kilpatrick Hills, Scotland
- OS grid: NS470774

Duncolm (Scottish Gaelic: Dùn Choluim) is a hill in Scotland. It is the highest point in both West Dunbartonshire and the Kilpatrick Hills, at an elevation of 401 metres (1,316 ft). Its name means "Fort of Columba".

It lies near Loch Humphrey. There is an easy path to the summit from the south-west, which passes over two subsidiary peaks, Little Duncolm and Middle Duncolm.
