= William Dunn (industrialist) =

Scottish agriculturist and businessperson (1770-1849)

- Born: 1770
- Died: 1849 (aged 78–79)
- Citizenship: United Kingdom

William Dunn (1770–1849) was a Scottish agriculturist, mechanic, and mill owner.

== Life ==
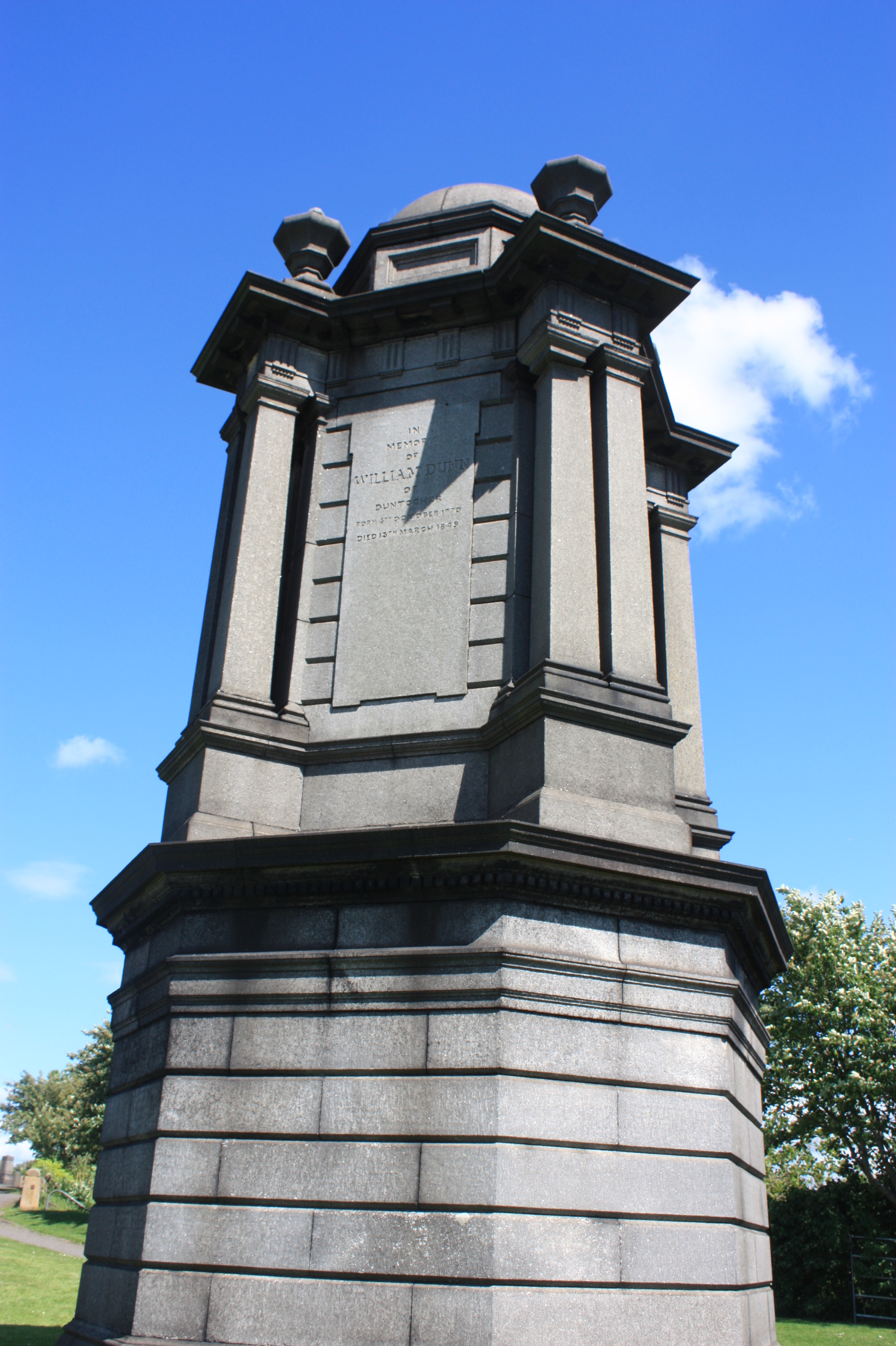
The grave of William Dunn, Glasgow Necropolis

He was born at Gartclash, in the parish of Kirkintilloch, Dumbartonshire, on 5 October 1770, and was educated at the parish school and partly at the neighbouring village of Campsie. Before he was eighteen he was left an orphan, with four brothers and a sister dependent on him for support. He had already given evidence of possessing an aptitude for mechanical contrivances. His first situation was in the establishment of a cotton-spinner named Waddington, at Stockingfield, near Glasgow. Here he learned iron-turning and machine-making. Three or four years later he was in Messrs. Black & Hastie's works at Bridge of Weir, from which he went to Pollokshaws, to the factories of John Monteith.

About 1800, having acquired a few hundred pounds by the sale of his patrimony of Gartclash, he resolved to start in business for himself, and accordingly opened a manufactory of machines in High John Street, Glasgow. In or about 1802, he bought a small spinning-mill in Tobago Street, Calton of Glasgow, and in 1808 he purchased the Duntocher mill, some seven miles distant from that city. A few years later he purchased from the Faifley Spinning Company the Faifley mill, which stood about a mile distant from the other.

In 1813, he became the proprietor of the Dalnotter Ironworks, which had been used for slitting and rolling iron, and for making implements of husbandry; and after having greatly enlarged the two mills he already owned, he was encouraged by the rapid increase of his business to build upon the site of these ironworks the Milton mill, the foundation of which was laid in 1821, and which was destroyed by fire twenty-five years later. Finally, in 1831 the Hardgate mill was built in the same neighbourhood. All these works, lying near to each other, were exclusively applied to the spinning and weaving of cotton.

Under Dunn's auspices Duntocher, which had before hardly deserved the name of a village, became a thriving and populous place. Previously to his first purchase in 1808, the hands employed at the works did not exceed a hundred and fifty; at his death their number was about two thousand. Dunn became a large purchaser of land in the neighbourhood of his works, and ultimately his estates extended upwards of two miles along the banks of the Clyde, and about three miles along the banks of the canal. Upon this property, twelve hundred acres of which were farmed by himself, he employed more than two hundred and fifty men. The wages which he annually paid in this parish alone totalled £35,000.

Dunn died at Mountblow, 13 March 1849, leaving property worth £500,000. Most of Dunn's property went to his brother, Alexander Dunn.

He is buried in Glasgow Necropolis with a monument designed by John Thomas Rochead. The substantial monument faces north from the upper section facing the main path.
