= Duntocher =

Village in West Dunbartonshire, Scotland

Coordinates: 55.924°N 4.417°W

Duntocher: Scottish Gaelic: Dùn Tòchair
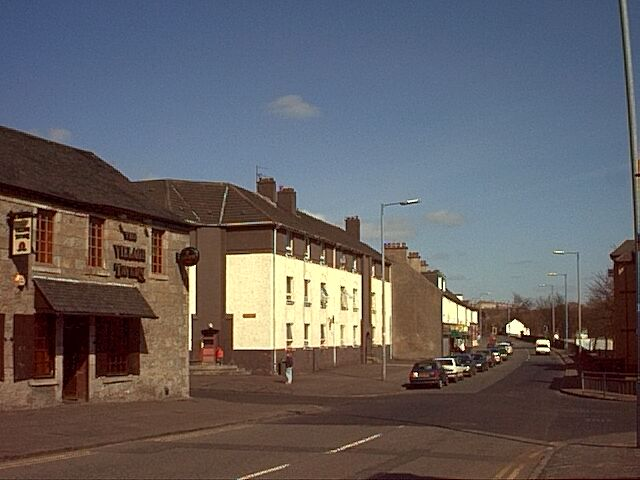
- Main Street, Duntocher

- Location within West Dunbartonshire
- Population: 6,680 (2020)
- OS grid reference: NS490730
- Council area: West Dunbartonshire
- Lieutenancy area: Dunbartonshire
- Country: Scotland
- Sovereign state: United Kingdom
- Post town: CLYDEBANK
- Postcode district: G81 6
- Dialling code: 01389
- Police: Scotland
- Fire: Scottish
- Ambulance: Scottish
- UK Parliament: West Dunbartonshire
- Scottish Parliament: Clydebank and Milngavie

Duntocher (Scottish Gaelic: Dùn Tòchair or Druim Tòchair) is a village in West Dunbartonshire, Scotland. It has an estimated population of 6,850. The etymology of the name of the village indicates that its name means "the fort on the causeway".

Duntocher has effectively become a northern suburb of the nearby town of Clydebank, as have neighbouring Hardgate and Faifley. Duntocher expanded due to housebuilding by Clydebank Burgh Council after the Second World War, although the area was never formally absorbed into the burgh. When burghs were abolished by local government reorganisation in 1975, however, Duntocher was included in the larger Clydebank District, which existed until the creation of West Dunbartonshire in 1997. Further housing was built by the Wimpey firm in the late 1960s and early 1970s, on what had been green belt land. Along with Faifley and Hardgate, Duntocher falls within West Dunbartonshire's Kilpatrick ward with a combined population of 12,719 in 2011.

At one time this was the most north westerly point on the Glasgow Corporation Transport tram system, trams operating from here via Hardgate to Clydebank, and at times, on to Partick depot.

Duntocher historically had several cotton and corn mills, driven by the Duntocher Burn which is the traditional boundary between Duntocher and neighbouring village Hardgate.

The Antonine Wall also runs through the village, and ancient Roman fortifications are still visible in the local Goldenhill Park. Lottery funding is to provide funds for a children's playpark at Goldenhill. Sir George Macdonald wrote about the findings at Duntocher.

Duntocher has a Roman Catholic church – St. Mary's, a United Free Church of Scotland – Duntocher West, and a Church of Scotland – Duntocher Trinity. The village also has one Roman Catholic primary school – St Mary's and one non-denominational, Carleith Primary School.

The village has a main street (Dumbarton Road) which acts as the main focal point for village activity. The majority of the villages shops and pubs, the cafe and the local churches and village halls are located along or very close to a small stretch of this road

The village is at the southern edge of the Kilpatrick Hills.

== History ==
The Roman Fort at Duntocher has been known about since at least the 18th century. Digital reconstructions of the fort and the fortlet it was built to replace, have been created.

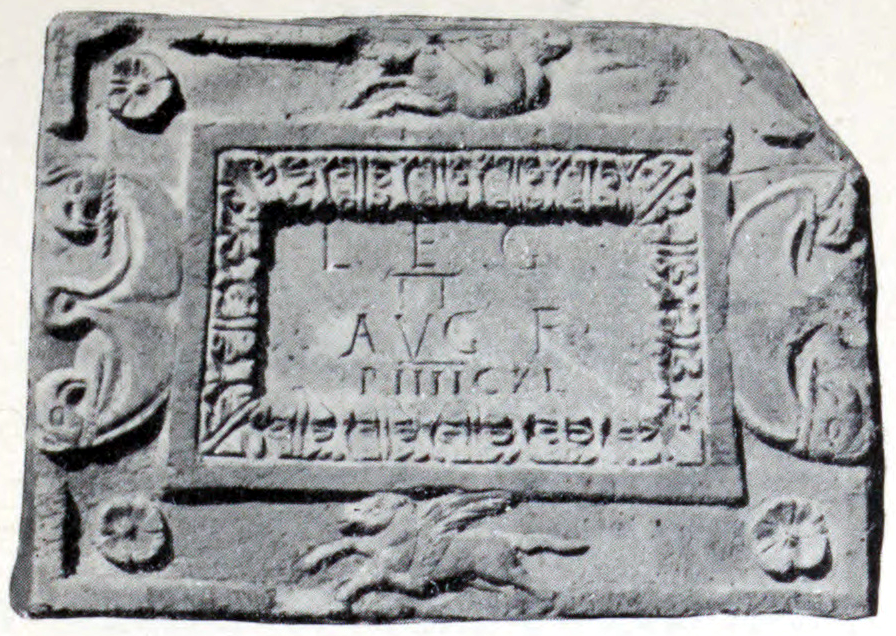
RIB 2203. Distance Slab of the Second Legion George MacDonald calls in no. 12 in the 2nd edition of his book The Roman Wall in Scotland. It has been scanned and a video produced.

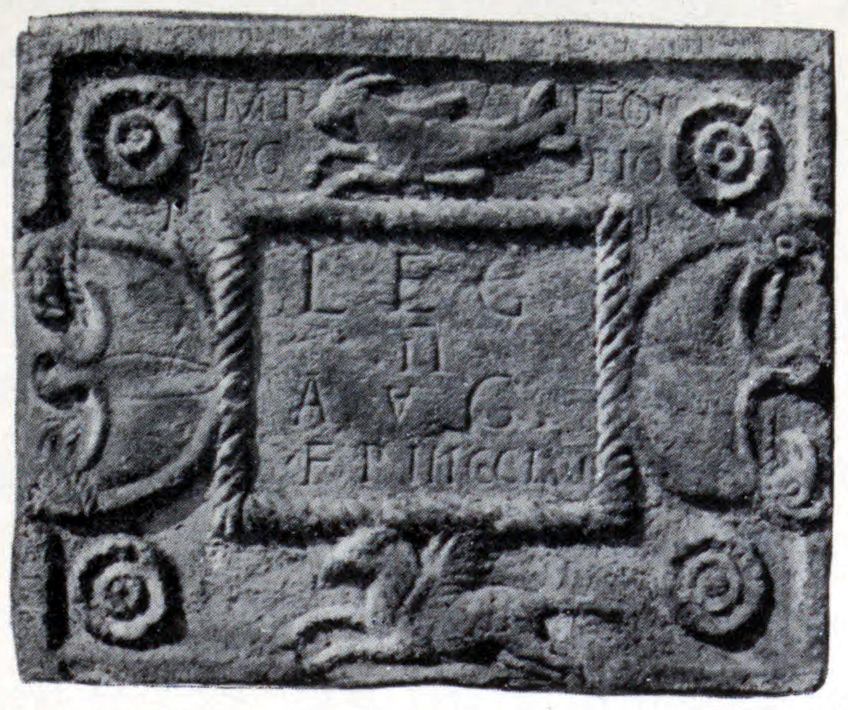
RIB 2204. Distance Slab of the Second Legion George MacDonald calls in no. 14 in the 2nd edition of his book The Roman Wall in Scotland. It has been scanned and a video produced.

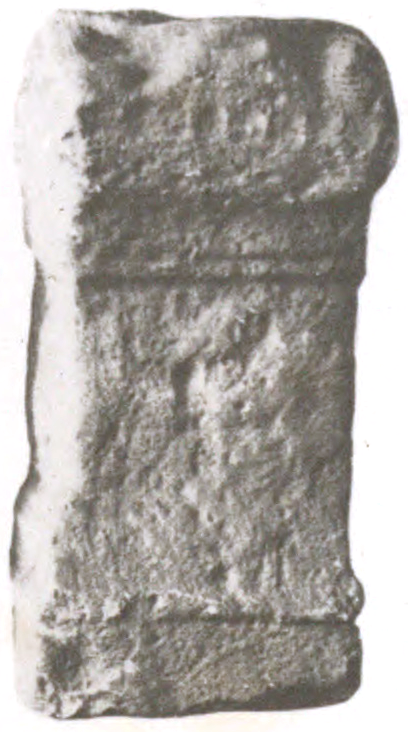
RIB 2201. Altar dedicated to Jupiter Optimus Maximus

Two distance slabs of the Second Legion were found in the area. Other distance slabs by the Second Legion have been mapped with RTI and include one from Balmuildy. The Second Legion is also associated with The Bridgeness Slab. The slabs are two of the four inscriptions on stone found at Duntocher. The first, with its upper right corner missing, also lacks information about its discovery. Both slabs have a capricorn (half goat, half fish) above and a Pegasus (winged horse) below their inscriptions; these are both emblems of the Second Legion. Both slabs also have two decorative pelta shields, one on either side of the slab each of which is embellished with two griffins' heads. Symmetry suggests both were designed with four rosettes in the corners though one has the upper right rosette missing. Other differences between the slabs are the amount of decoration around the inscription, the Emperor's title, but most notably the number of paces being 4,140 versus 3,271. Other find which have been RTI mapped include rooftile fragments, a water nymph fountainhead, and a hypocausted tile.

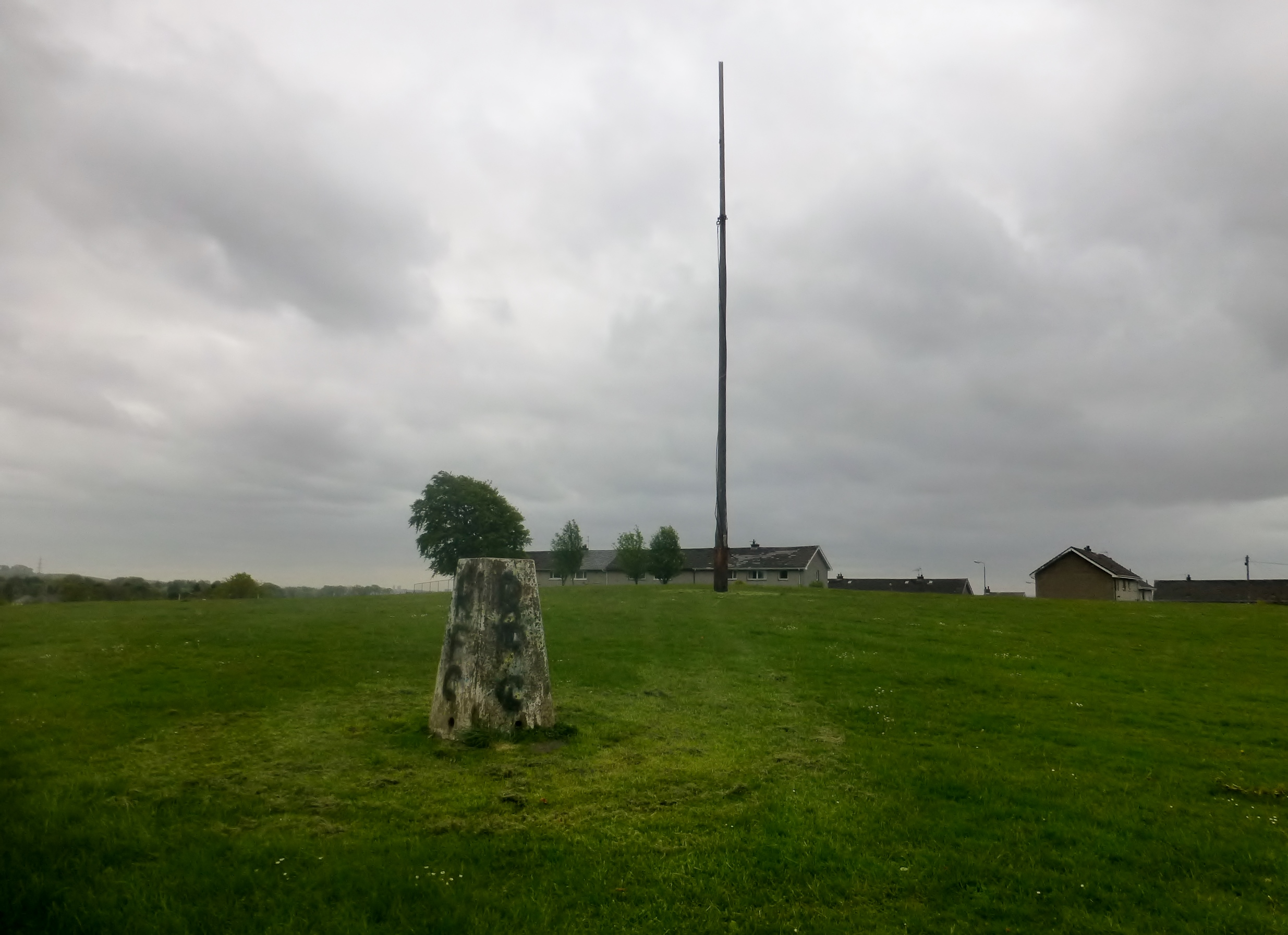
Golden Hill Trig Point

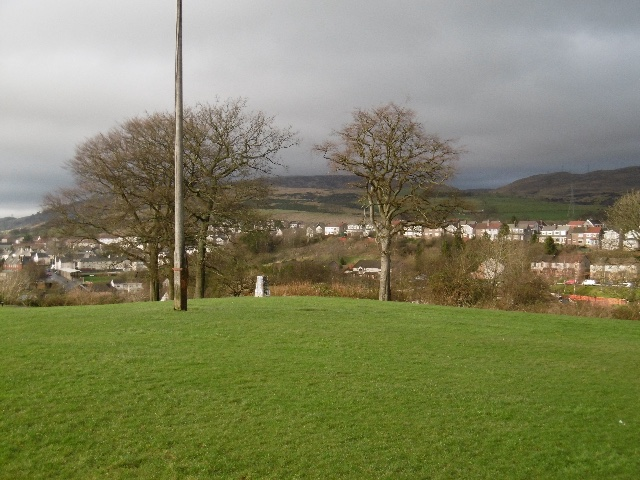
Golden Hill

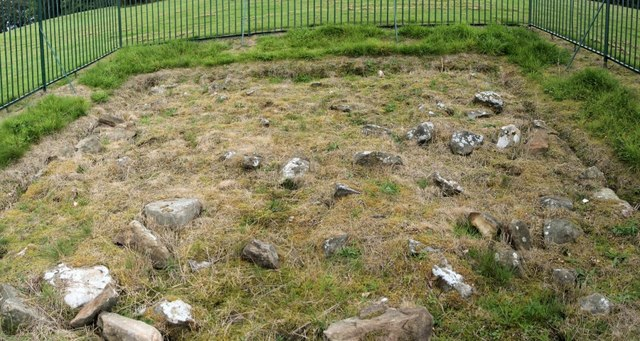
base of the Wall

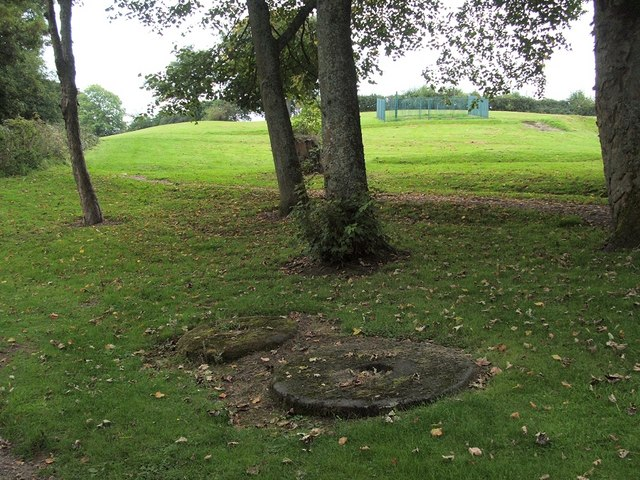
Millstones in Goldenhill Park

Until 1649 the villages of Bowling, West Dunbartonshire, Duntocher, Hardgate, Milton and Old Kilpatrick were all part of Kilpatrick Parish, then for a further 240 or so years formed part of Old or West Kilpatrick Parish. In 1889 however, the formation of Dumbarton County Council saw the transfer of authority to that body where it remained until 1975 when the villages were finally split up. Bowling and Milton became part of the Dumbarton District Council area and Duntocher, along with Old Kilpatrick and Hardgate, was absorbed by Clydebank District.

Industry around the village was aided by the nearness of the Duntocher Burn, a fast flowing waterway ideal for industrial purposes. Between 1808 and 1831 four large cotton mills were set up there leading to a significant population increase and subsequent improvements being instituted to road, canal and river transport links. The boom was relatively short lived however and the demise of the cotton industry towards the end of the 1800s left Duntocher the loser. There were coal and lime mines near Duntocher in the 19th century.

Today all five of the villages form a bedroom community for commuters to Clydebank, Dumbarton and Glasgow.

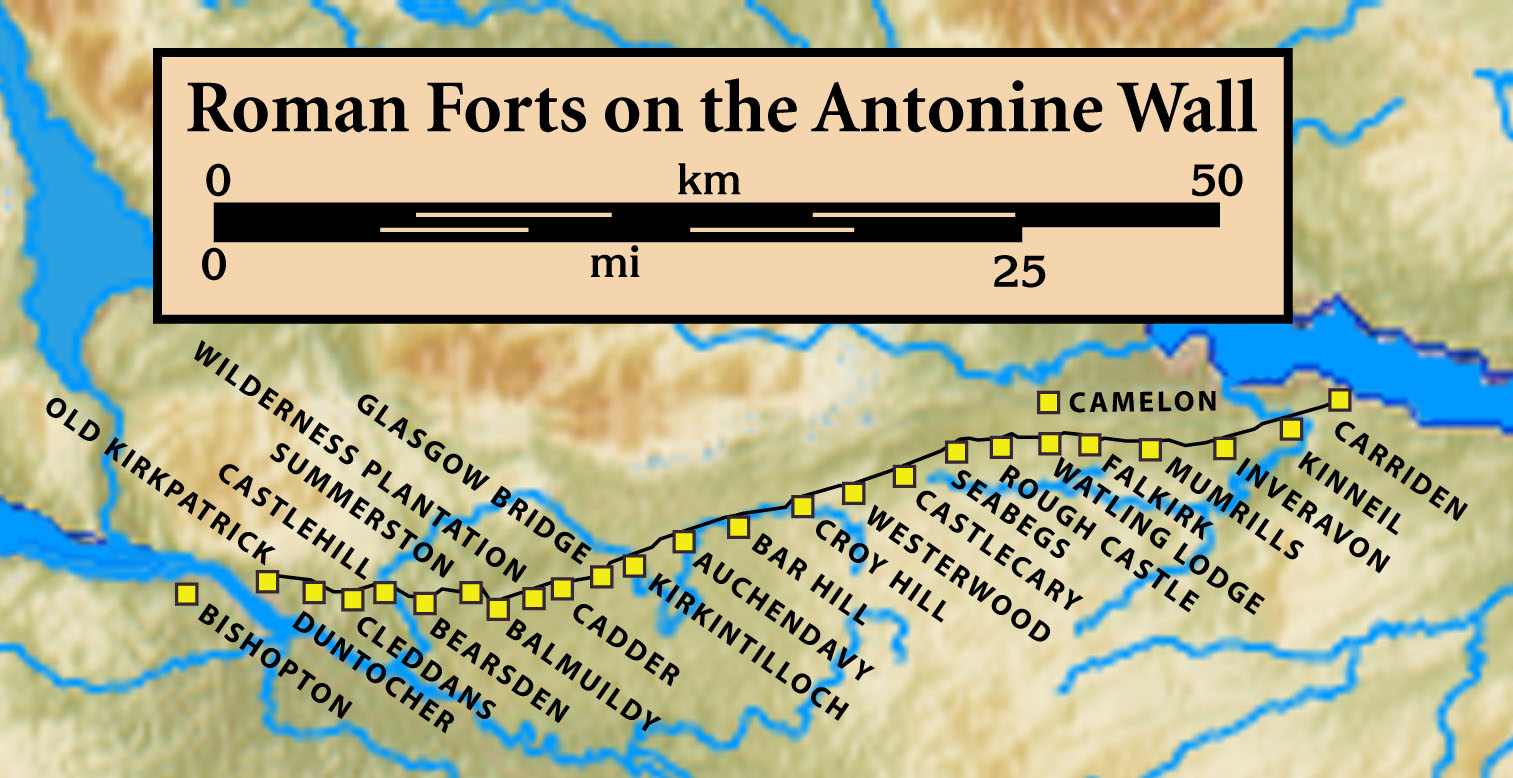
Forts and Fortlets associated with the Antonine Wall from west to east: Bishopton, Old Kilpatrick, Duntocher, Cleddans, Castlehill, Bearsden, Summerston, Balmuildy, Wilderness Plantation, Cadder, Glasgow Bridge, Kirkintilloch, Auchendavy, Bar Hill, Croy Hill, Westerwood, Castlecary, Seabegs, Rough Castle, Camelon, Watling Lodge, Falkirk, Mumrills, Inveravon, Kinneil, Carriden

== Culture ==
Traditionally a gala was held in the first week in June for Duntocher and Hardgate.

== Notable people ==
- Chic Brodie, footballer
- William Dunn, industrialist
- Alistair McAuley, part of Timorous Beasties design partnership
- Charles O'Neill, musician
