= The Fortified House in Scotland =

1962-1970 five-volume book by Nigel Tranter

- Volume One, first edition
- Author: Nigel Tranter
- Publication date: 1962

The Fortified House in Scotland is a five-volume book by the Scottish author Nigel Tranter.

Written between 1962 and 1970, it covers almost seven hundred buildings in Scotland which fall under the general description of "fortalices, lesser castles, peel towers, keeps and defensible lairds' houses". As such castles are included (although not the largest examples like Edinburgh or Stirling castles), as well as many smaller, semi-ruinous tower houses. Tranter illustrated each one with pen and ink sketches.

The work was an expansion of The Fortalices and Early Mansions of Southern Scotland 1400-1650, which Tranter had written in the 1930s. However, much of the updated work has itself been superseded or has fallen out of date, and the author never claimed the work to be scholarly. However original first editions are very collectable, as are complete sets. The first four original volumes were published by Oliver & Boyd, with the fifth by W. & R. Chambers. The work was reprinted in 1977 and 1986 by James Thin, under their imprint of The Mercat Press. Tranter made some revisions to the material for the reprints, but they were not described as revised or second editions. The additional entries which had appeared in the original fifth volume were also redistributed across their appropriate volumes for the reprints.

== Volumes ==
- Volume 1: South East Scotland (1962)
  - covering West Lothian, Midlothian, East Lothian, Peeblesshire, Roxburghshire, Selkirkshire and Berwickshire
- Volume 2: Central Scotland (1963)
  - covering Stirlingshire, Fife, Kinross-shire, Perthshire and Clackmannanshire
- Volume 3: South West Scotland (1965)
  - covering Renfrewshire, Lanarkshire, Ayrshire, Wigtownshire, Kirkcudbrightshire and Dumfriesshire
- Volume 4: Aberdeenshire, Angus and Kincardineshire (1966)
- Volume 5: North and West Scotland and Miscellaneous (1970)
  - covering Inverness-shire, Nairnshire, Banffshire, Moray, Caithness, Sutherland, Ross and Cromarty, Argyllshire, Buteshire, Dunbartonshire, Orkney and Shetland and additional structures not included in earlier volumes.
