= Nigel Tranter =

Scottish writer

- Born: 23 November 1909; Glasgow, Scotland
- Died: 9 January 2000 (aged 90); Gullane, Scotland
- Occupation: Writer
- Writing career
- Pen name: Nye Tredgold
- Period: 1935–2005 (published posthumously)
- Genre: Non-fiction; Historical fiction Adventure; Westerns; Children's
- Subject: Scottish history Architecture; Travel (Scotland)

Nigel Tranter OBE (23 November 1909 – 9 January 2000) was a Scottish writer of a wide range of books on history and architecture, both fiction and non-fiction. He was best-known for his popular and well-researched historical novels, covering centuries of Scottish history.

== Early life ==
Nigel Tranter was born in Glasgow and educated at George Heriot's School in Edinburgh. He trained as an accountant and worked in Scottish National Insurance Company, founded by his uncle. In 1933, he married May Jean Campbell Grieve and had two children, Frances May and Philip. He joined the Royal Artillery and served in East Anglia in the Second World War.

== Writings ==
From childhood onwards, Tranter took a great interest in castles and their associated history. As a result, in 1935, at age 25, he published his first book, The Fortalices and Early Mansions of Southern Scotland. Encouraged by his wife, he wrote his first novel, In Our Arms Our Fortune, which was rejected by the publishers. However, Trespass soon followed and was accepted by The Moray Press. Unfortunately, they went bankrupt soon after its publication in 1937, and he didn't receive any payment. Over the next few years, he wrote several more novels in the same vein: light-hearted romantic adventures in varied settings from modern-day Europe to historical Scotland. Tranter also wrote several westerns under the pseudonym Nye Tredgold to provide additional income for his family, and a dozen children's books—adventure stories aimed at 8- to 10-year-olds.

War service did not stop Tranter writing, and a number of novels were published during the war years, some inspired by his own experiences.

Between 1962 and 1971 Tranter published the landmark series The Fortified House in Scotland (in five volumes). This attempted to cover the history and structure of every primarily domestic castle in Scotland, 663 buildings in all. A small number of non-domestic buildings associated with priories, churches, communal defence etc. etc. were also included. Highly regarded at the time, it is still read by those who have an interest in this specialist area.

While researching the castles, Tranter realised that there were many characters and incidents in Scottish history which could be used as the basis for novels, which he tried to make as accurate as possible – while making no effort to hide his own strong Scottish identity. The Queen's Grace (1953) was his first novel to focus on an historical character (in this case, Mary, Queen of Scots), although it contained a high fictional content. Two trilogies followed: the MacGregor Trilogy (1957–1962) and the Master of Gray Trilogy (1961–1965). By this time, Tranter was well established as a writer of serious historical fiction. The fictional content decreased as he became more experienced, and his later novels were almost entirely composed around the historical record. These novels have gained a wide readership while providing a basic grounding in Scottish history to their readers.

== The historian ==
As noted above, Tranter had a lifelong interest in Scottish castles. Initially intrigued by their architectural history, Tranter soon developed an interest in Scottish history generally. As he moved into historical novels, his research became deeper until he had amassed vast knowledge of Scotland's history to a very detailed level. His ability to retell history as a 'story' provided an accessible source for many people. As well as his novels, this knowledge was translated into such non-fiction works as The Story of Scotland. Becoming intimate with so much of the historical record, Tranter formed many theories of history, some of which were contrary to established thought. These were presented throughout his books. One example of this is his belief that the stone under the Coronation Chair is not the true Stone of Destiny, but a thirteenth-century fake which he refers to as the Westminster Stone.

== Public life ==
Tranter was involved in many activities outside his writing. From the 1940s onwards he delivered lectures to private groups and organisations, and, as his writing career developed, he undertook many speaking engagements, including some tours to the USA. He was also invited to join—or was instrumental in setting up—many committees and community groups, in fields as diverse as Scottish Highlands roads and settlement, wild fowling and Athelstaneford's Flag Fund.

His notable involvements include: the original Scottish Convention, a cross-party pressure group established during the 1940s to encourage devolution (Edinburgh chairman); National Covenant Association; National Forth Road Bridge Committee; Saltire Society (honorary president).

Following the publication of The Fortified House in Scotland, Tranter was regularly asked for advice on the restoration of many tower houses and castles. He was closely involved in the restoration of over 60 castles, such as Fa'side Castle and Menstrie Castle.

== Death ==
Tranter died on 9 January 2000, aged 90, after contracting flu, in Gullane, where his funeral and burial took place.

A final eight novels were published after Tranter's death, the last book Hope Endures appearing in 2005. According to his daughter these "were all finished at the time of his death, as he always kept ahead in his writing".

== Bibliography ==
A number of the books produced by Tranter had dust jackets designed by the illustrator Val Biro.

=== Historical novels ===
==== Set before 1286 ====
- Druid Sacrifice (1993 by Hodder & Stoughton)
- Columba (1987 by Hodder & Stoughton)
- Kenneth (1990 by Hodder & Stoughton)
- High Kings and Vikings (1998 by Hodder & Stoughton)
- MacBeth the King (1978 by Hodder & Stoughton)
- Margaret the Queen (1979 by Hodder & Stoughton)
- David the Prince (1980 by Hodder & Stoughton)
- Lord of the Isles (1983 by Hodder & Stoughton)
- Tapestry of the Boar (1993 by Hodder & Stoughton)
- Sword of State (1999 by Hodder & Stoughton)
- Envoy Extraordinary (1999 by Hodder & Stoughton)
- Crusader (1991 by Hodder & Stoughton)
- True Thomas (1981 by Hodder & Stoughton)

==== Set between 1286 and 1603 ====
- The Wars of Independence (1286–1329)
  - The Isleman (2003)
  - The Wallace
  - Robert the Bruce trilogy
    - The Steps to the Empty Throne (1969)
    - The Path of the Hero King (1970)
    - The Price of the King's Peace (1971)
- The Bruce Legacy (1329–1406)
  - Flowers of Chivalry (1987)
  - Courting Favour (2000)
  - Stewart trilogy
    - Lords of Misrule (1976)
    - A Folly of Princes (1977)
    - The Captive Crown (1977)
  - The End of the Line (2000)
- The Jameses (1406–1542)
  - Lion Let Loose (1967)
  - The Lion's Whelp (1997)
  - Black Douglas (1968)
  - Price of a Princess (1994)
  - Lord in Waiting (1994)
  - The Admiral (2001)
  - Chain of Destiny (1964)
  - A Flame for the Fire (1998)
  - A Stake in the Kingdom (1966)
  - James V trilogy
    - The Riven Realm (1984)
    - James by the Grace of God (1985)
    - Rough Wooing (1986)
- Mary and James VI (1513–1603)
  - Marie & Mary (2004)
  - The Marchman (1997)
  - Warden of the Queen's March (1989)
  - The Queen's Grace (1953)
  - A Rage of Regents (1996)
  - Right Royal Friend (2003)
  - Hope Endures (2005)
  - Master of Gray trilogy
    - Lord and Master (1961)
    - The Courtesan (1963)
    - Past Master (1965)
  - Children of the Mist (1992)

==== Set after 1603 ====
- The Wisest Fool (1974) - 1603–1611 - James VI
- Poetic Justice (1996) - 1611-17 - William Alexander, 1st Earl of Stirling
- Unicorn Rampant (1984) - 1617–1619 - John Stewart of Methven, illegitimate son of Ludovic Stewart, 2nd Duke of Lennox
- Mail Royal (1989) - 1621 - David Gray
- Montrose omnibus
  - The Young Montrose (1972) - 1636–1645 - James Graham, 1st Marquess of Montrose
  - Montrose: The Captain-General (1973) - 1645–1650
- Honours Even (1995) - 1650-1654
- Triple Alliance (2001) - 1680-7?
- The Patriot (1982) - 1678–1707 - Andrew Fletcher
- MacGregor trilogy
  - MacGregor's Gathering (1957) - 1706–1708
  - The Clansman (1959) - 1711–1716
  - Gold for Prince Charlie (1972) - 1743–1746

=== Children's books ===
- Spaniard's Isle (1958, Brockhampton Press)
- Border Riding (1959, Brockhampton Press)
- Nestor the Monster (1960, Brockhampton Press; paperback edition 1992, B & W Publishing)
- Birds of a Feather (1961, Brockhampton Press)
- The Deer Poachers (1961, Blackie)
- Something Very Fishy (1962, Collins)
- Give a Dog a Bad Name (1963, Collins. Published as Smoke Across the Highlands in USA, 1964, Platt & Monk)
- Silver Island (1964, Thomas Nelson)
- Pursuit (1965, Collins)
- Tinker Tess (1967, Dobson Books)
- Fire and High Water (1967, Collins)
- To the Rescue (1968, Dobson Books)

=== Non-fiction books ===
- The Fortalices and Early Mansions of Southern Scotland 1400–1650 (1935, The Moray Press)

Contains the sketches and notes of small castles visited throughout his teenage years and early twenties. Tranter later described it as "terribly pretentious and pretty amateurish." He expanded the format for his later work The Fortified House in Scotland.

- The Fortified House in Scotland (in five volumes, c. 1963)
- Pegasus Book of Scotland (1964, Dobson Books)
- Outlaw of the Highlands: Rob Roy (1965, Dobson Books)

A study of Scottish folk hero Rob Roy MacGregor. Reissued as Rob Roy MacGregor by Lochar Publishing (1991), and Neil Wilson Publishing (1995).

- Land of the Scots (1968, Hodder & Stoughton)
- The Queen's Scotland (in four volumes, 1972–1977)

Intended to be a detailed gazetteer of every parish in Scotland. His wife assisted him heavily and she died before it could be completed. Tranter never finished the series.

- Portrait of the Border Country (1972, Robert Hale)

Revised edition published in 1987 as The Illustrated Portrait of the Border Country.

- Portrait of the Lothians (1979, Robert Hale)
- Nigel Tranter's Scotland (1981, Richard Drew Publishing. Penguin edition 1983)
- Scottish Castles: Tales and Traditions

First published 1982 by Macdonald Publishing. Revised edition by Neil Wilson Publishing, 1993. US Edition by Barnes & Noble, 1993.

- Traveller's Guide to the Scotland of Robert the Bruce (1985, Routledge & Kegan Paul; US edition by Historical Times Inc, 1985)
- The Story of Scotland (1987, Routledge & Kegan Paul. Re-issued 1992, Neil Wilson Publishing)
- Footbridge to Enchantment (1992, Locahr publishing. Revised edition 1993, B&W Publishing)
- No Tigers in the Hindu Kush (Editor) (1968, Hodder & Stoughton). A tribute to his son Philip who died in an accident
- Flight of Dutchmen

=== Westerns ===
Tranter claimed each of these books took him six weeks to write. He sold them outright for £100 each. They were published under the pseudonym Nye Tredgold.

- Thirsty Range (1950, Ward Lock & Co)
- Heartbreak Valley (1951, Ward Lock & Co)
- Big Corral (1952, Ward Lock & Co)
- Trail Herd (1952, Ward Lock & Co)
- Desert Doublecross (1953, Ward Lock & Co)
- Cloven Hooves (1954, Ward Lock & Co)
- Dynamite Trail (1955, Ward Lock & Co)
- Rancher Renegade (1956, Ward Lock & Co)
- Trailing Trouble (1957, Ward Lock & Co)
- Bloodstone Trail (1958, Ward Lock & Co)

== Awards and honours ==
- Honorary MA from the University of Edinburgh, 1971
- OBE for services to literature, 1983
- BBC Scotland Scot of the Year, 1989
- Honorary Doctor of Literature, University of Strathclyde, 1990

== See also ==
- Bridal Path, a 1952 novel by Tranter
