= Cochno Stone =

Large rock inscribed with petroglyphs in Scotland

Coordinates: 55.9347°N 4.3957°W

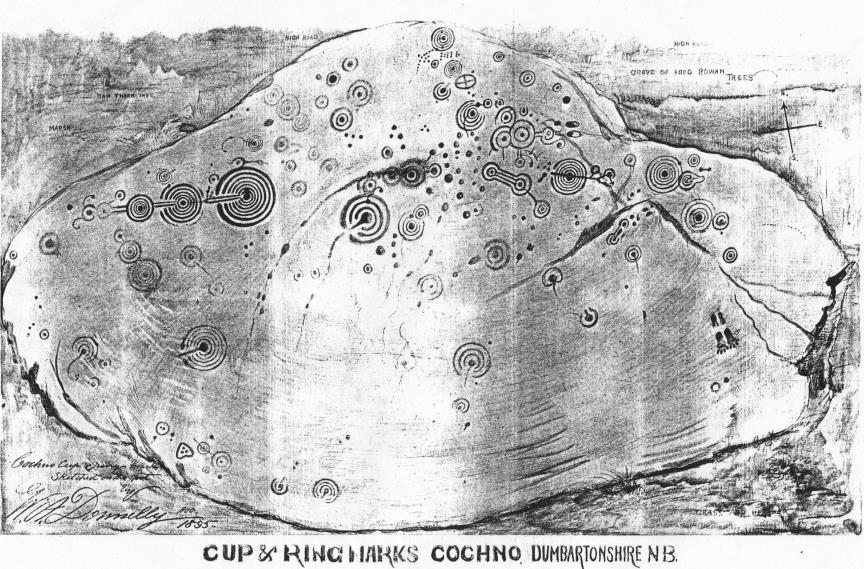
Sketch by W. A. Donnelly (dated 1895) of the Cup & Ring marks on the Cochno Stone. Published by John Bruce in 1896

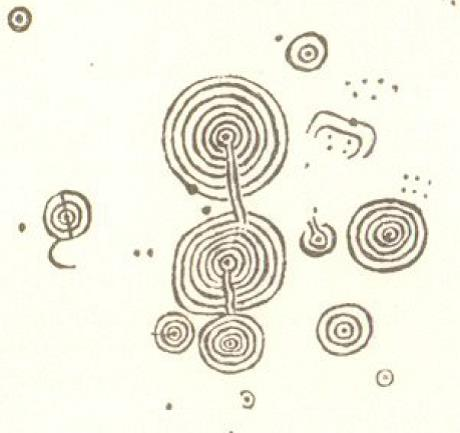
Detail sketched by James Harvey of Duntocher in 1889

The Cochno Stone is a large cup and ring marked rock at Auchnacraig, Faifley, West Dunbartonshire, Scotland, next to the Cochno farm. It is also known variously as "Whitehill 1" and "the Druid Stone".

The Bronze Age rock art is found on a stone measuring 42 by 26 feet (12.8 by 7.9 metres), and was documented in 1887 by the Rev. James Harvey. It features around 90 carved indentations, considered to be one of the finest sets of petroglyphs in Scotland.

The stone was reburied in 1965 to protect it against vandalism. In 2015 it was partially re-exposed for investigation during a three-day dig by a team involving archaeologists from the University of Glasgow, with a more complete re-exposure following a year later.
