= Kilpatrick Hills =

Range of hills in central Scotland

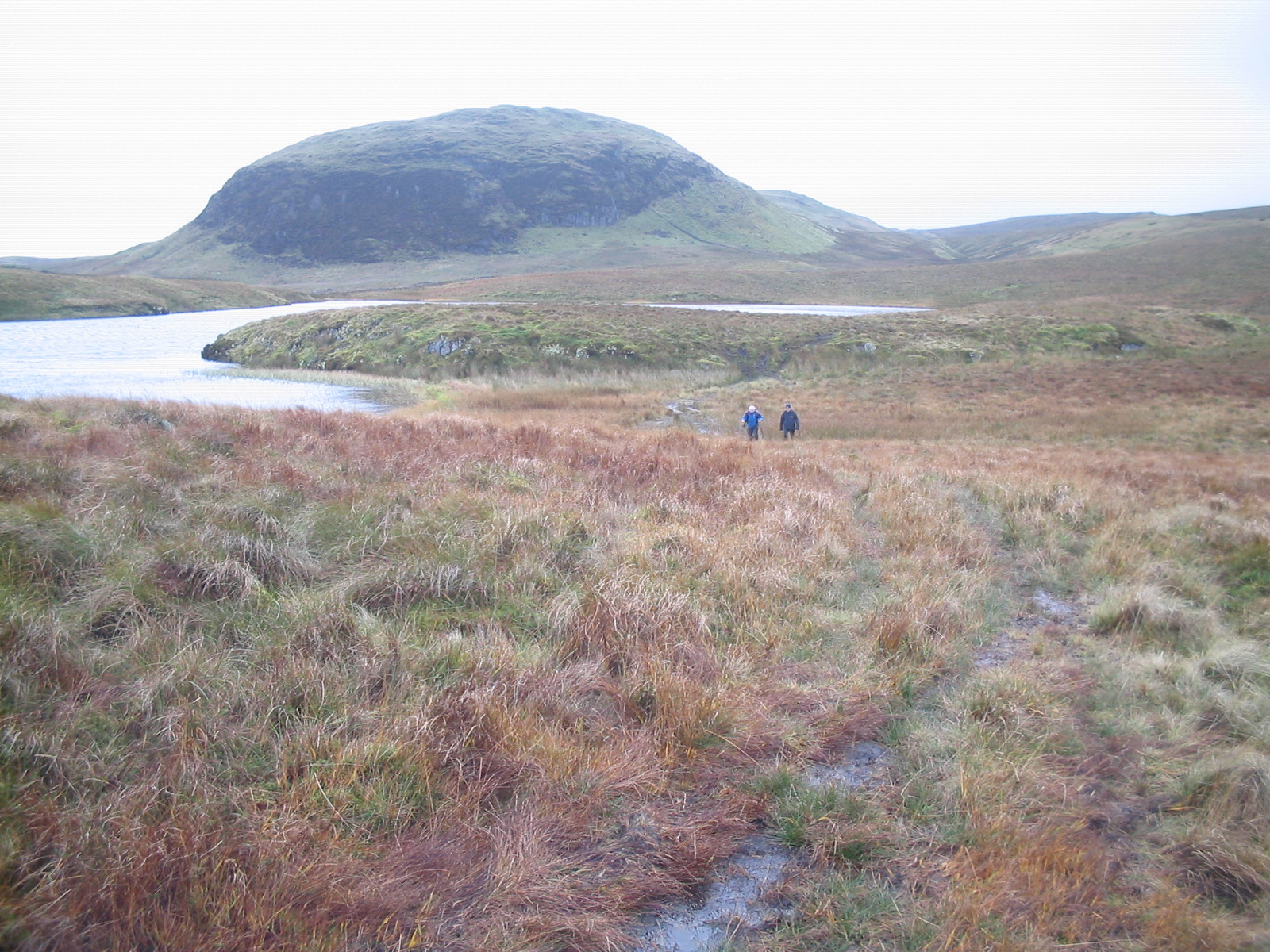
Duncolm in the heart of the Kilpatrick Hills with Lily Loch at its foot

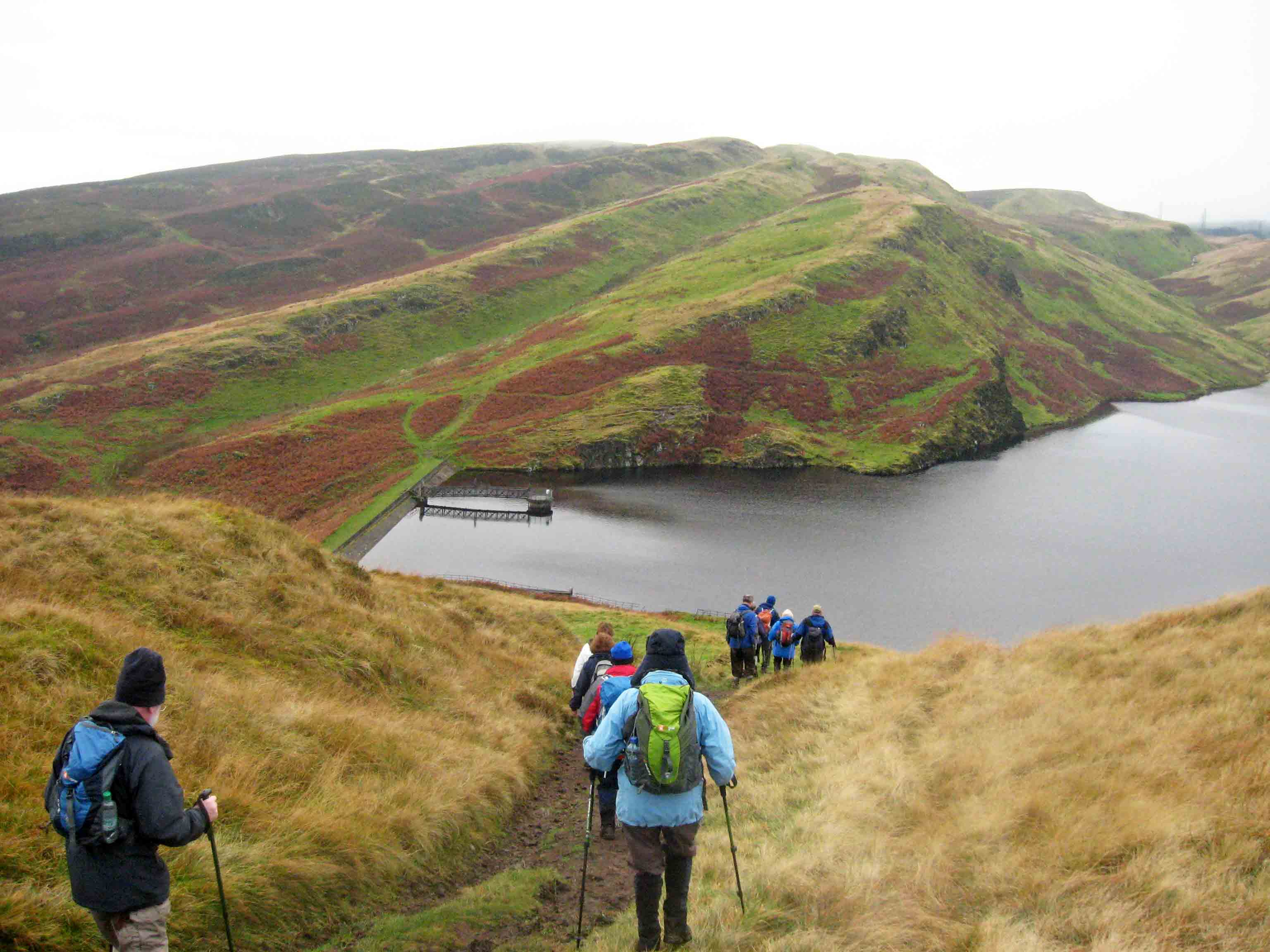
View from Cochno Hill over Greenside Reservoir to The Slacks

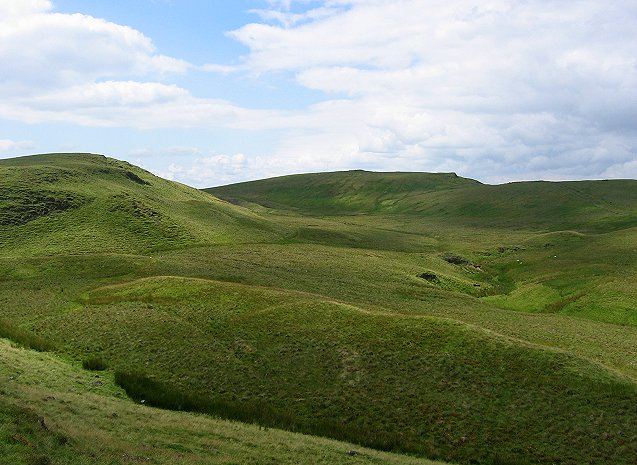
Fynloch Hill

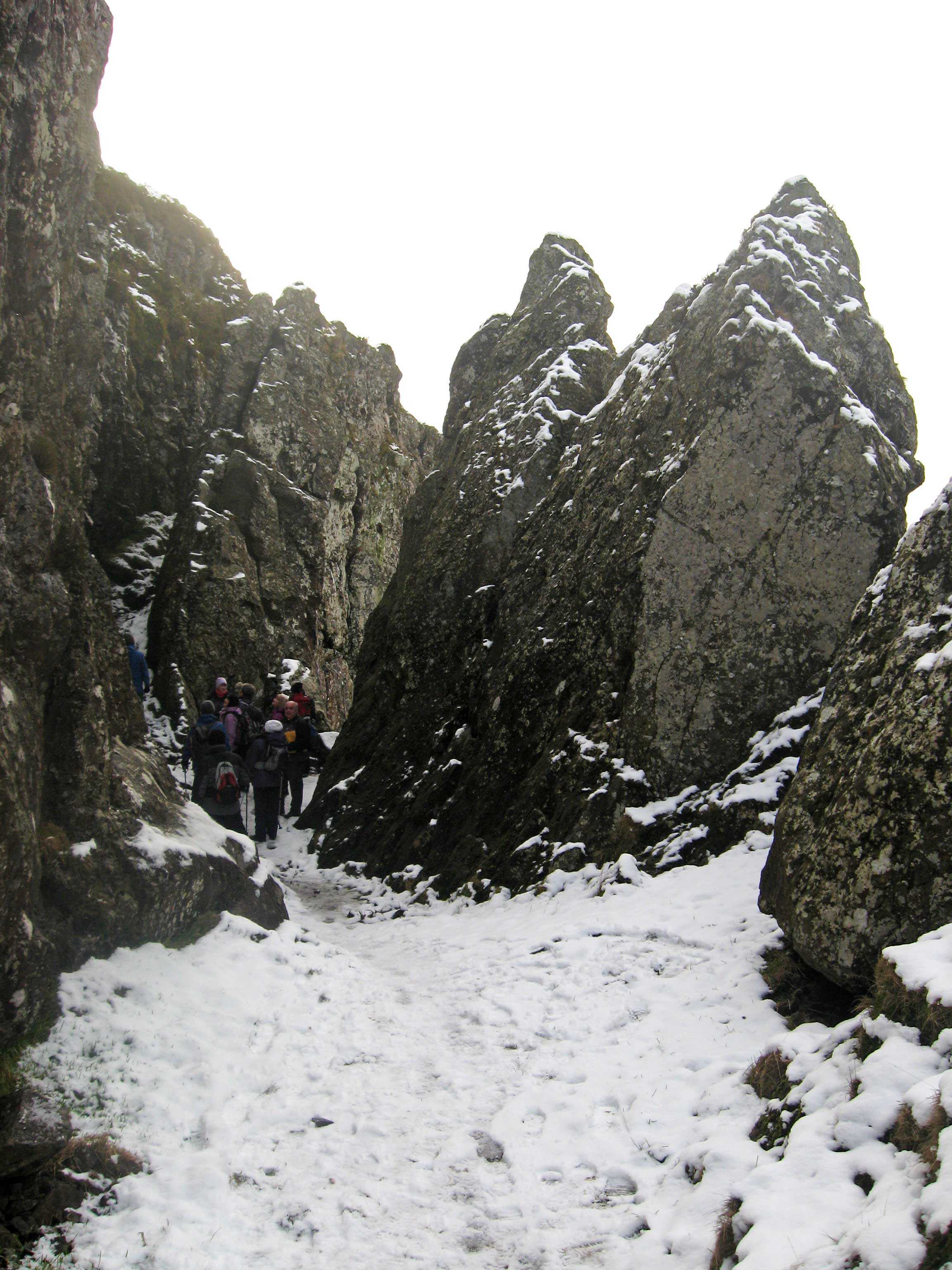
Walking through The Whangie in winter

The Kilpatrick Hills are a range of hills in central Scotland, stretching from Dumbarton in the west to Strathblane in the east.

Strathblane divides the Kilpatricks from the Campsie Fells to the east, while to the north is part of the Loch Lomond and the Trossachs National Park. To west and south the hills are fringed by the settlements of Balloch, Dumbarton, Milton, Bowling, Old Kilpatrick, Clydebank, Bearsden and Milngavie. The majority of the range is within West Dunbartonshire, although it extends into the East Dunbartonshire and Stirling areas.

The highest points in the range are Duncolm (1,314 ft or 401 m) and Fynloch (1,313 ft or 400 m). The Kilpatricks offer a number of viewpoints and places of interest: among the best known are Doughnot Hill and The Whangie. The area features several reservoirs.

The hills are of volcanic origin, modified by subsequent glaciation.

== Geology ==
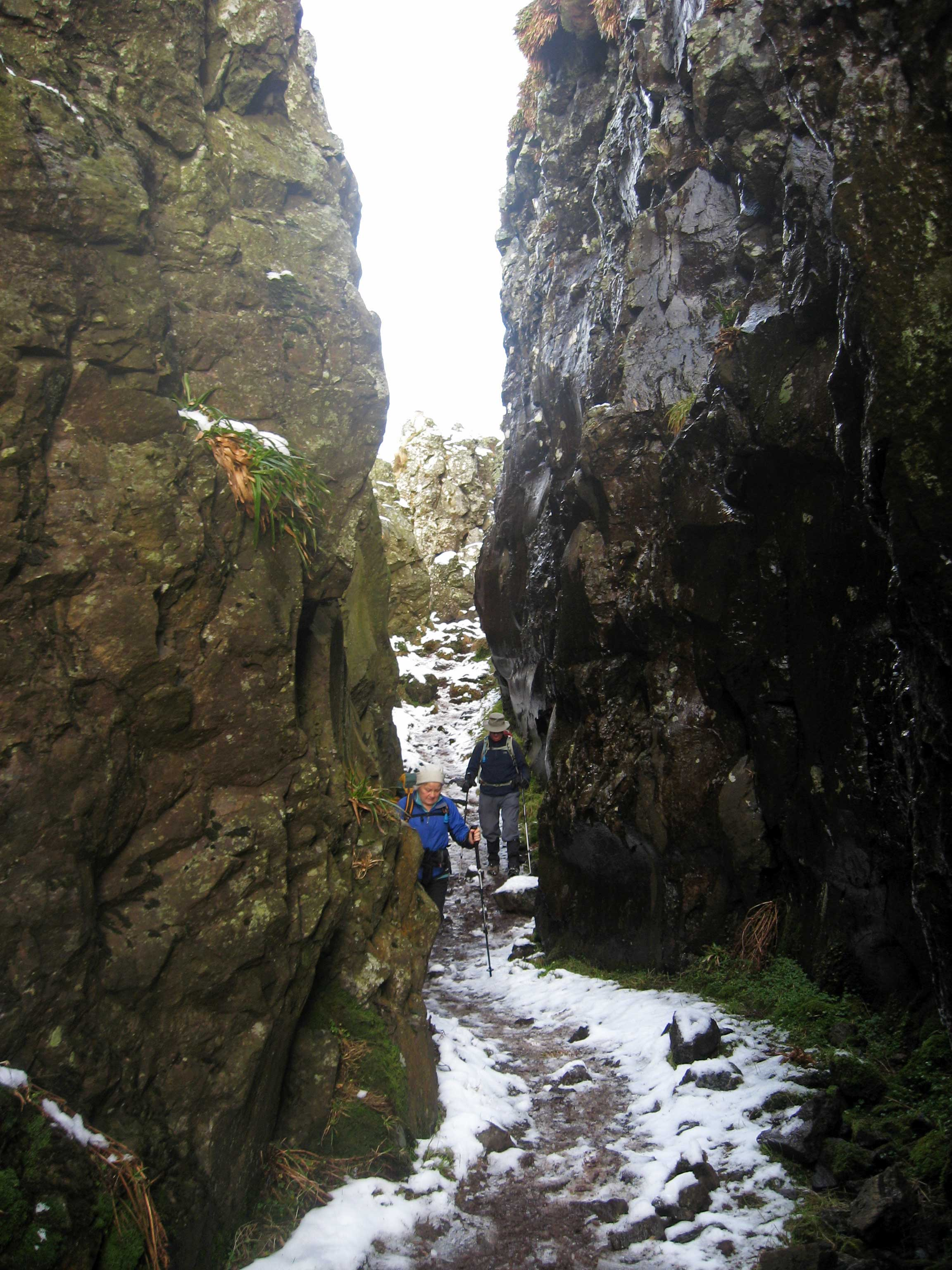
View along The Whangie from the south.

The Kilpatrick Hills are a part of the Clyde Plateau Lavas. These are about 340 million years old. Basaltic types of rocks (lavas, tuffs and agglomerates) predominate here. These are produced by denudation of the successive flows.

The Whangie in the north of the Kilpatricks is of particular interest to geologists and casual walkers alike. It consists of a slice of the hillside that has been separated from the main slope. This has created a narrow chasm up to 10 metres (33 ft) high and about 100 metres (330 ft) in length through which visitors can walk. It has commonly been explained as result of glacial plucking, but more recent research indicates that a translational landslide was the cause. During an ice age, a glacier slowly undermined the crag, opening up cracks in the rock and causing this chasm to form.

The etymology of the Whangie's name is obscure but it might derive from the old Scots for slice (as in whang o' cheese). Local folklore suggests that it was created by the devil flicking his tail as he flew past.

== Archaeological sites ==
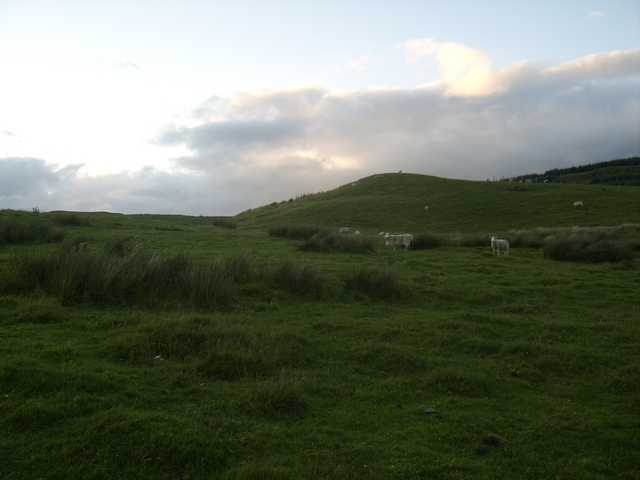
Maidens Paps cairn near Cochno Loch.

There are several archaeological sites on the south-facing slopes of the hills. The chambered cairn at Carnhowit is situated on the plateau top near the edge of Cochno Loch, at a height of 275 metres (902 ft). There are three other cairns, which may be from the Bronze Age period. One known as Maidens Paps is nearby, just to the east of Jaw Reservoir which abuts Cochno Loch. Both it and another cairn on Cochno Hill are at a height of about 250 metres (820 ft), and the third cairn is sited at Wester Duntiglennan at approximately 150 metres (490 ft) height. Cists have been found at Cochno and Duntocher, and on the slopes below 150 metres (490 ft) several groups of cup and ring marks have been found on outcrops, mostly around Auchnacraig and Whitehill, with other groups further west along the slopes to above Bowling, West Dunbartonshire.

== Topology and toponymy ==
The hills are named after the village of Old Kilpatrick, which lies at their southern foot. The following table lists summits over 1,000 feet (300 m). Duncolm, the highest point of the range, is also the only Marilyn in the Kilpatricks, having a relative height of over 150 metres (490 ft).

Name	Height	Coordinates	Notes
Duncolm	1,314 feet (401 m)	55°57′55.69″N 4°27′4.97″W	Has trig point. - Etymology: Scots Gaelic dun, hill-fort or hill of Colm, (Saint) Columba
Fynloch	1,313 feet (400 m)	55°57′41.6″N 4°28′0.81″W	
Middle Duncolm	1,289 feet (393 m)	55°57′46.7″N 4°27′26.98″W	
Darnycaip	1,232 feet (376 m)	55°57′36.97″N 4°29′4.33″W	
Doughnot Hill	1,227 feet (374 m)	55°58′0.55″N 4°29′21.67″W	Has trig point.
The Slacks	1,199 feet (365 m)	55°56'34.23'N 4°27'3.16''W	Has trig point.
Auchineden	1,171 feet (357 m)	55° 59' 35.6676'' N4° 24' 53.9676'' W	Has trig point.
Jesus' Thimble	1,171 feet (357 m)	55°57′20.68″N 4°23′48.38″W	Has a trig point. Trig point location: 55.956060 N, -4.391698 W
Craigarestie	1,166 feet (355 m)		
Meikle White Hill	1,163 feet (354 m)		
Berry Bank	1,152 feet (351 m)		
Brown Hill	1,149 feet (350 m)		
Cochno Hill	1,140 feet (350 m)	55°57'03.3"N 4°25'19.0"W	
Knockupple	1,116 feet (340 m)		
Craighirst	1,074 feet (327 m)		
Thief's Hill	1,026 feet (313 m)		
Pappert Hill	820 feet (250 m)	55°59′19.51″N 4°31′43.41″W	Has trig point.
Gallangad Muir	558 feet (170 m)	56°00′24.23″N 4°28′55.66″W	Has trig point.

== See also ==
- List of mountains in Scotland
- Maiden Paps (disambiguation)
- Breast shaped hills
