= Demographics of Scotland =

- Population pyramid of Scotland in 2020
- Population: ▲5,545,500 (2025)
- Fertility rate: ▼1.25 (2024)

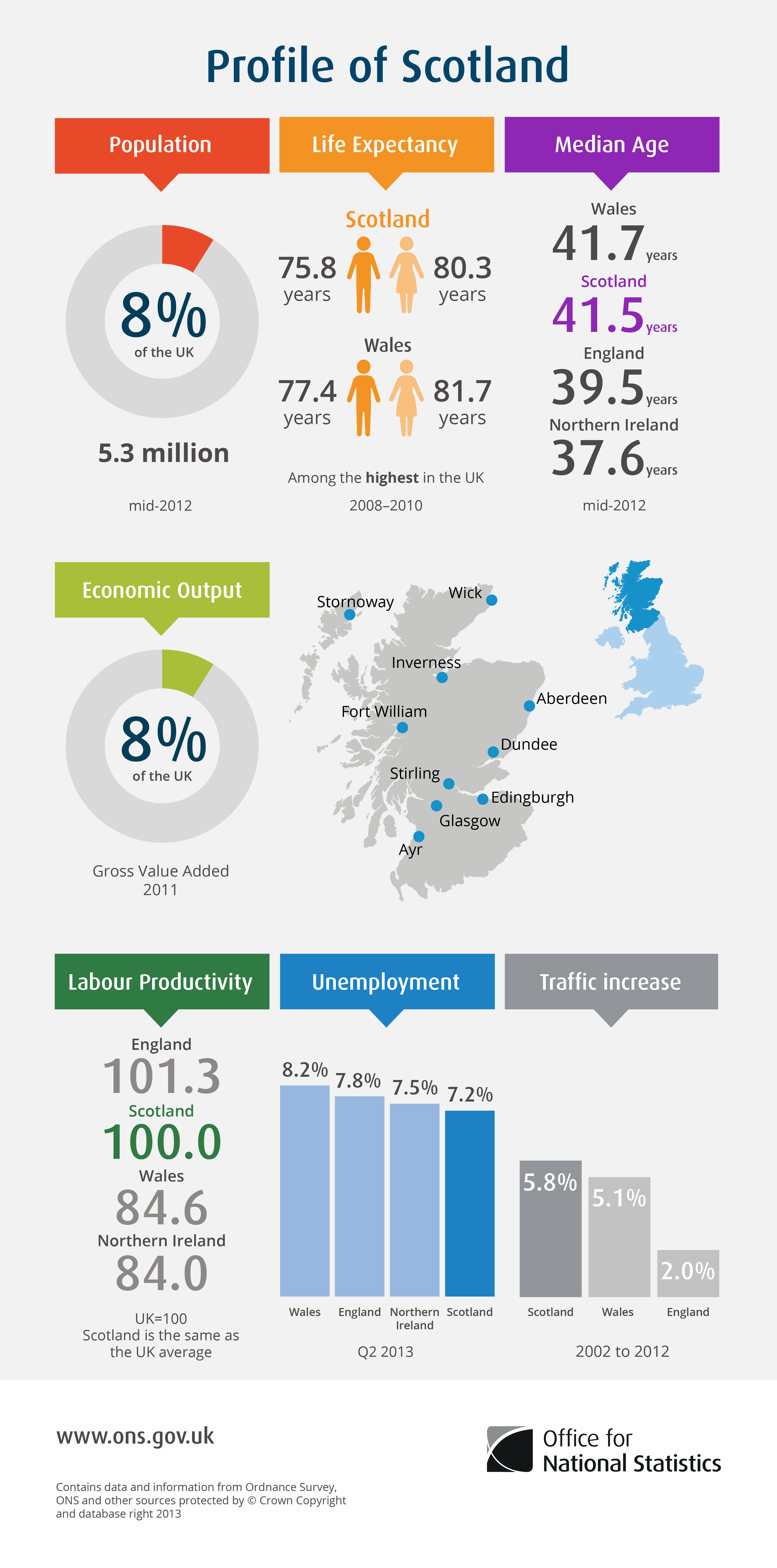
Profile of Scotland

The demography of Scotland includes all aspects of population, past and present, in the area that is Scotland. Scotland had a population of 5,463,300 in 2019. The population growth rate in 2011 was estimated as 0.6% per annum according to the 2011 GROS Annual Review.

Covering an area of 78,782 square kilometres (30,418 sq mi), Scotland has a population density of 67.2/km^{2} (174/sq mi). Around 70% of the country's population (3.5 million) live in the Central Belt —a region stretching in a northeast–southwest orientation between the major Scottish cities of Edinburgh and Glasgow, and including the major settlements of Paisley, Stirling, Falkirk, Perth and Dundee, in the Central Lowlands (80%). Other concentrations of population include the northeast coast of Scotland, principally the regions around the cities of Aberdeen and Inverness, and the west coast around the town of Ayr. The Scottish Highlands and the island group of Eilean Siar have the lowest population densities at 9/km^{2} (23/sq mi). Glasgow has the highest population density at 3,289/km^{2} (8,520/sq mi).

Until April 2011, responsibility for estimating the population of Scotland, as well as recording births, deaths and marriages, was overseen by the General Register Office for Scotland (GROS), headed by the Registrar-General for Scotland. From 1 April 2011 onwards, the GROS merged with the National Archives of Scotland to become the National Records of Scotland. The new organisation is still required under the terms of the Registration of Births, Deaths and Marriages (Scotland) Act 1965, to present a Registrar-General's annual report of demographic trends to the Scottish Government. In conjunction with the rest of the United Kingdom, the National Records for Scotland is also responsible for conducting a decadal census of population. The most recent one took place in March 2022.

== Historical population ==
=== Population change over time ===
In the United Kingdom, a census was taken every ten years from 1801 onwards; with the exception of 1941 due to the Second World War. Population data for years prior to that is provided from directories and gazetteers

Year	Population
1500	500,000
1600	800,000
1707	1,000,000
1755	1,265,380
1801	1,608,420
1811	1,805,864
1821	2,091,521
1831	2,364,386
1841	2,620,184
1851	2,888,742
1861	3,062,294
1871	3,360,018
1881	3,735,578
1891	4,025,647
1901	4,472,103
1911	4,760,904
1921	4,882,407
1931	4,842,989
1939^{a}	5,006,700
1951	5,095,969
1961^{b}	5,179,000
1971	5,229,000
1981	5,035,000
1991^{c}	5,083,000
2001	5,062,000
2011	5,295,000
2022	5,436,000

Notes

a. There was no census in 1941 however there was a National Register of the Civilian Population in 1939

b. Data for 1961 onwards rounded to nearest thousand

c. Data for 1991 mid-year estimate

Census population and growth rate
Year	Pop.	±% p.a.
1855	2,978,065	—
1860	3,054,738	+0.51%
1870	3,336,712	+0.89%
1880	3,705,994	+1.06%
1890	4,003,131	+0.77%
1900	4,436,958	+1.03%
1910	4,738,611	+0.66%
1920	4,866,866	+0.27%
1930	4,828,004	−0.08%
1940	4,841,241	+0.03%
1950	5,114,513	+0.55%
1960	5,177,658	+0.12%
1970	5,213,700	+0.07%
1980	5,193,900	−0.04%
1990	5,081,270	−0.22%
2000	5,062,940	−0.04%
2010	5,262,200	+0.39%
2020	5,413,100	+0.28%
2024	5,546,900	+0.61%

=== Age distribution ===
Ages	1901	1931	1951	1961	1971	1981	1991	2001	2011	2022
0–14 years	33	27	25	26	25.9	21.4	18.9	17.9	16.1	15.3
15–64 years	62	66	65	64	61.8	64.5	65.8	66.2	67.1	64.6
65 years and over	5	7	10	11	12.3	14.1	15.3	15.9	16.8	20.1
Total (%)	100	100	100	100	100	100	100	100	100	100

== Vital statistics ==
=== Birth and mortality ===
Life expectancy in Scotland over time

Table of birth and mortality since 1900

	Average population	Live births	Deaths	Natural change	Crude birth rate (per 1000)	Crude death rate (per 1000)	Natural change (per 1000)	Fertility rate
1900	4,437,000	131,401	82,296	49,105	29.6	18.5	11.1	
1901	4,479,000	132,192	80,107	52,085	29.5	17.9	11.6	
1902	4,507,000	132,267	77,941	54,326	29.4	17.3	12.0	
1903	4,536,000	133,525	76,002	57,523	29.4	16.8	12.7	
1904	4,564,000	132,603	77,981	54,622	29.1	17.1	12.0	
1905	4,593,000	131,410	74,536	56,874	28.6	16.2	12.4	
1906	4,621,000	132,005	75,635	56,370	28.6	16.4	12.2	
1907	4,650,000	128,840	77,296	51,544	27.7	16.6	11.1	
1908	4,680,000	131,362	77,838	53,524	28.1	16.6	11.4	
1909	4,709,000	128,669	74,632	54,037	27.3	15.8	11.5	
1910	4,739,000	124,059	72,268	51,791	26.2	15.2	11.0	
1911	4,751,000	121,850	71,732	50,118	25.7	15.1	10.6	
1912	4,741,000	122,790	72,340	50,450	25.9	15.3	10.6	
1913	4,728,000	120,516	73,069	47,447	25.5	15.5	10.0	
1914	4,747,000	123,934	73,557	50,377	26.1	15.5	10.6	
1915	4,771,000	114,181	81,631	32,550	23.9	17.1	6.8	
1916	4,795,000	109,942	70,640	39,302	22.9	14.7	8.2	
1917	4,810,000	97,441	69,483	27,958	20.2	14.4	5.8	
1918	4,812,000	98,554	78,372	20,182	20.5	16.3	4.2	
1919	4,820,000	106,268	75,149	31,119	22.1	15.6	6.5	
1920	4,864,000	136,546	68,179	68,367	28.1	14.0	14.1	
1921	4,882,000	123,201	66,210	56,991	25.2	13.6	11.7	
1922	4,898,000	115,085	72,905	42,180	23.5	14.9	8.6	
1923	4,888,000	111,902	63,283	48,619	22.9	13.0	9.9	
1924	4,862,000	106,900	70,357	36,543	22.0	14.5	7.5	
1925	4,867,000	104,137	65,507	38,630	21.4	13.5	7.9	
1926	4,864,000	102,449	63,780	38,669	21.1	13.1	7.9	
1927	4,853,000	96,672	65,830	30,842	19.9	13.6	6.4	
1928	4,848,000	96,822	65,271	31,551	20.0	13.5	6.5	
1929	4,832,000	92,880	70,917	21,963	19.2	14.7	4.6	
1930	4,828,000	94,549	64,285	30,264	19.6	13.3	6.3	
1931	4,843,000	92,220	64,229	27,991	19.0	13.3	5.8	
1932	4,883,000	91,000	66,045	24,955	18.6	13.5	5.1	
1933	4,912,000	86,546	64,848	21,698	17.6	13.2	4.4	
1934	4,934,000	88,836	63,741	25,095	18.0	12.9	5.1	
1935	4,953,000	87,928	65,331	22,597	17.8	13.2	4.6	
1936	4,966,000	88,928	66,749	22,179	17.9	13.4	4.5	
1937	4,977,000	87,810	68,942	18,868	17.6	13.9	3.8	
1938	4,993,000	88,627	62,953	25,674	17.8	12.6	5.1	
1939	5,007,000	86,913	64,413	22,500	17.4	12.9	4.5	
1940	5,065,000	86,392	72,775	13,617	17.1	14.9	2.2	
1941	5,160,000	89,748	72,558	17,190	17.4	14.6	2.8	
1942	5,174,000	90,703	64,963	25,740	17.5	13.2	4.3	
1943	5,189,000	94,669	66,733	27,936	18.2	13.9	4.4	
1944	5,210,000	95,920	64,603	31,317	18.4	13.5	4.9	
1945	5,187,000	86,924	62,655	24,269	16.8	13.1	3.7	
1946	5,167,000	104,413	64,605	39,808	20.2	13.0	7.2	
1947	5,120,000	113,147	66,200	46,947	22.1	12.9	9.2	
1948	5,150,000	100,344	60,979	39,365	19.5	11.8	7.6	
1949	5,156,000	95,674	63,488	32,186	18.6	12.3	6.2	
1950	5,168,000	92,530	63,996	28,534	17.9	12.4	5.5	
1951	5,102,000	90,639	65,778	24,861	17.8	12.9	4.9	
1952	5,101,000	90,422	61,510	28,912	17.7	12.1	5.7	
1953	5,100,000	90,913	58,878	32,035	17.8	11.5	6.3	
1954	5,104,000	92,315	61,380	30,935	18.1	12.0	6.1	
1955	5,111,000	92,539	61,645	30,894	18.1	12.1	6.0	
1956	5,120,000	95,313	61,792	33,521	18.6	12.1	6.5	
1957	5,125,000	97,977	61,143	36,834	19.1	11.9	7.2	
1958	5,141,000	99,481	62,065	37,416	19.4	12.1	7.3	
1959	5,163,000	99,251	63,061	36,190	19.2	12.2	7.0	
1960	5,178,000	101,292	61,764	39,528	19.6	11.9	7.6	
1961	5,184,000	101,169	63,928	37,241	19.5	12.3	7.2	
1962	5,198,000	104,334	63,189	41,145	20.1	12.2	7.9	
1963	5,205,000	102,691	65,521	37,170	19.7	12.6	7.1	
1964	5,209,000	104,355	61,039	43,316	20.0	11.7	8.3	
1965	5,210,000	100,660	62,868	37,792	19.3	12.1	7.3	
1966	5,201,000	96,536	63,689	32,847	18.6	12.2	6.3	
1967	5,198,000	96,221	59,523	36,698	18.5	11.5	7.1	
1968	5,200,000	94,786	63,311	31,475	18.2	12.2	6.1	
1969	5,209,000	90,290	63,821	26,469	17.3	12.3	5.1	
1970	5,215,000	87,335	63,640	23,695	16.7	12.2	4.5	
1971	5,219,000	86,728	61,614	25,114	16.6	11.8	4.8	2.53
1972	5,223,000	78,550	65,017	13,533	15.0	12.4	2.6	2.27
1973	5,225,000	74,392	64,545	9,847	14.2	12.4	1.9	2.13
1974	5,226,000	70,093	64,740	5,353	13.4	12.4	1.0	1.97
1975	5,227,000	67,943	63,125	4,818	13.0	12.1	0.9	1.90
1976	5,227,000	64,895	65,253	-358	12.4	12.5	-0.1	1.80
1977	5,226,000	62,342	62,294	48	11.9	11.9	0.0	1.70
1978	5,212,000	64,295	65,123	-828	12.3	12.5	-0.2	1.74
1979	5,204,000	68,366	65,747	2,619	13.1	12.6	0.5	1.84
1980	5,194,000	68,892	63,299	5,593	13.3	12.2	1.1	1.84
1981	5,180,000	69,054	63,828	5,226	13.3	12.3	1.0	1.84
1982	5,165,000	66,196	65,022	1,174	12.8	12.6	0.2	1.74
1983	5,148,000	65,078	63,454	1,624	12.6	12.3	0.3	1.70
1984	5,139,000	65,106	62,345	2,761	12.7	12.1	0.5	1.68
1985	5,128,000	66,676	63,967	2,709	13.0	12.5	0.5	1.70
1986	5,112,000	65,812	63,467	2,345	12.9	12.4	0.5	1.68
1987	5,099,000	66,241	62,014	4,227	13.0	12.2	0.8	1.68
1988	5,077,000	66,212	61,957	4,255	13.0	12.2	0.8	1.68
1989	5,078,000	63,480	65,017	-1,537	12.5	12.8	-0.3	1.61
1990	5,081,000	65,973	61,527	4,446	13.0	12.1	0.9	1.67
1991	5,083,000	67,024	61,041	5,983	13.2	12.0	1.2	1.69
1992	5,086,000	65,789	60,937	4,852	12.9	12.0	1.0	1.67
1993	5,092,000	63,337	64,049	-712	12.4	12.6	-0.1	1.62
1994	5,102,000	61,656	59,328	2,328	12.1	11.6	0.5	1.58
1995	5,104,000	60,051	60,500	-449	11.8	11.9	-0.1	1.55
1996	5,092,000	59,296	60,654	-1,358	11.6	11.9	-0.3	1.56
1997	5,083,000	59,440	59,494	-54	11.7	11.7	-0.0	1.58
1998	5,077,000	57,319	59,164	-1,845	11.3	11.7	-0.4	1.55
1999	5,072,000	55,147	60,281	-5,134	10.9	11.9	-1.0	1.51
2000	5,063,000	53,076	57,799	-4,723	10.5	11.4	-0.9	1.48
2001	5,064,000	52,527	57,380	-4,853	10.4	11.3	-1.0	1.49
2002	5,055,000	51,270	58,103	-6,833	10.1	11.5	-1.4	1.47
2003	5,057,000	52,432	58,472	-6,040	10.3	11.6	-1.2	1.52
2004	5,078,000	53,957	56,187	-2,230	10.6	11.1	-0.4	1.58
2005	5,095,000	54,386	55,747	-1,361	10.6	10.9	-0.3	1.60
2006	5,117,000	55,690	55,093	597	10.8	10.8	0.1	1.64
2007	5,144,000	57,781	55,986	1,795	11.2	10.9	0.3	1.70
2008	5,169,000	60,041	55,700	4,341	11.5	10.8	0.8	1.77
2009	5,194,000	59,046	53,856	5,190	11.3	10.4	1.0	1.73
2010	5,222,000	58,791	53,967	4,824	11.2	10.3	1.0	1.72
2011	5,255,000	58,590	53,661	4,931	11.1	10.3	0.8	1.69
2012	5,313,000	58,027	54,937	3,090	10.9	10.5	0.4	1.68
2013	5,327,000	56,014	54,700	1,314	10.5	10.3	0.3	1.62
2014	5,347,000	56,725	54,239	2,486	10.6	10.2	0.4	1.64
2015	5,373,000	55,098	57,566	-2,470	10.3	10.7	-0.4	1.59
2016	5,404,000	54,488	56,728	-2,240	10.1	10.5	-0.4	1.56
2017	5,424,000	52,861	57,883	-5,022	9.8	10.7	-1.0	1.51
2018	5,438,000	51,308	58,503	-7,192	9.5	10.8	-1.4	1.46
2019	5,463,000	49,863	58,108	-8,245	9.2	10.6	-1.5	1.42
2020	5,466,000	46,809	64,093	-17,284	8.6	11.7	-3.1	1.33
2021	5,479,900	47,786	63,587	-15,824	8.8	11.6	-2.9	1.36
2022(c)	5,436,600	46,959	62,941	-15,982	8.6	11.5	-2.9	1.33
2023	5,490,100	45,935	63,445	-17,510	8.3	11.6	-3.3	1.27
2024	5,543,300	45,763	62,291	-16,528	8.3	11.2	-2.9	1.25
2025	5,545,500	45,067	61,726	–16,659	8.1	11.0	–2.9	1.23

(c)= 2022 census results.

- Source: General Register Office for Scotland Birth and Mortality statistics from 1900

=== Current vital statistics ===
Period	Live births	Deaths	Natural increase
January–July 2025	26,319	35,295	–8,976
January–July 2026	26,035	35,342	–9,307
Difference	▼ –284 (-1.1%)	+47 (+0.1%)	▼ –331

=== Settlements by population ===
Largest cities or towns in Scotland (2020)
Rank	Name	Council area	Pop.	Rank	Name	Council area	Pop.
1	Glasgow	Glasgow City	632,350	11	Kirkcaldy	Fife	50,370
2	Edinburgh	City of Edinburgh	506,520	12	Inverness	Highland	47,790
3	Aberdeen	Aberdeen City	198,590	13	Perth	Perth and Kinross	47,350
4	Dundee	Dundee City	148,210	14	Kilmarnock	East Ayrshire	46,970
5	Paisley	Renfrewshire	77,270	15	Ayr	South Ayrshire	46,260
6	East Kilbride	South Lanarkshire	75,310	16	Coatbridge	North Lanarkshire	43,950
7	Livingston	West Lothian	56,840	17	Greenock	Inverclyde	41,280
8	Dunfermline	Fife	54,990	18	Glenrothes	Fife	38,360
9	Hamilton	South Lanarkshire	54,480	19	Stirling	Stirling	37,910
10	Cumbernauld	North Lanarkshire	50,530	20	Airdrie	North Lanarkshire	36,390

== Place of birth ==
Places of birth given by respondents to the 1991, 2001, 2011 and 2022 censuses were as follows:

Country of birth	1991		2001		2011		2022	
Country of birth	Number	%	Number	%	Number	%	Number	%
United Kingdom	4,849,580	97.0%	4,870,440	96.2%	4,926,119	93.0%	4,884,959	89.8%
Scotland	4,454,065	89.11%	4,410,400	87.13%	4,411,884	83.32%	4,321,512	79.44%
England	354,268	7.09%	408,948	8.08%	459,486	8.68%	506,207	9.31%
Wales	14,710	0.29%	16,623	0.33%	17,381	0.33%	18,219	0.33%
Northern Ireland	26,393	0.53%	33,528	0.66%	36,655	0.69%	37,260	0.68%
(United Kingdom) UK part not specified	144	<0.01%	941	0.02%	713	0.01%	1,763	0.03%
European Union (EU) Member countries			41,836	0.83%	137,285	2.59%	234,363	4.31%
(Republic of Ireland) Ireland	22,773	0.46%	21,774	0.43%	22,952	0.43%	22,083	0.41%
EU Other Member Countries (joined pre-2001)					59,031	1.11%		
Poland	3,623	0.07%	2,505	0.05%	55,231	1.04%	75,351	1.39%
EU Other Member Countries (joined post-2001)					78,254	1.48%		
Non-UK/EU Countries							320,520	5.89%
Total	4,998,567	100.00%	5,062,011	100.00%	5,295,403	100.00%	5,439,842	100.00%

The proportion of people residing in Scotland born outside the UK was 10.2% in 2022, compared with 7.0% in 2011, 3.8% in 2001 and 3.0% in 1991. Below are the fifteen largest overseas-born groups in Scotland according to the 2022 census, alongside the three previous censuses.

Country of birth	2022	2011	2001	1991
Poland	75,351	55,231	2,505	3,623
India	37,729	23,489	10,523	9,006
Pakistan	28,891	20,039	12,645	9,411
United States	23,863	15,919	11,149	12,589
Germany	23,315	22,274	18,703	13,898
(Republic of Ireland) Ireland	22,083	22,952	21,774	22,773
China	21,396	15,338	3,329	1,726
Nigeria	21,286	9,458	1,253	854
South Africa	15,253	10,607	7,803	1,427
Italy	14,486	6,048	4,936	3,947
Spain	12,208	4,908	2,555	1,042
Romania	12,102	2,387	327	122
Hong Kong	11,901	7,586	7,068	5,910
Canada	9,920	9,435	8,569	7,956
Australia	9,575	8,279	7,555	5,047
Overall – all overseas-born	554,883	369,284	191,571	148,987

== Age ==
Population pyramid from 1981 to projected pyramid in 2043

The age distribution based on the 2011 census was as follows.

Age group	Population	% of total
0–4	293,000	5.53
5–9	270,000	5.10
10–14	292,000	5.51
15–19	331,000	6.25
20–24	364,000	6.87
25–29	346,000	6.53
30–34	322,000	6.08
35–39	340,000	6.42
40–44	394,000	7.44
45–49	411,000	7.76
50–54	376,000	7.10
55–59	331,000	6.25
60–64	337,000	6.35
65–69	262,000	4.98
70–74	221,000	4.17
75–79	178,000	3.36
80–84	123,000	2.32
85–89	71,000	1.34
90+	37,000	0.70

== Ethnicity ==
Ethnic demography of Scotland 1981 – 2011

The 1991, 2001, 2011 and 2022 censuses recorded the following ethnic groups:

Demography of Scotland
Ethnic group	1971 estimations		1981 estimations		1991		2001		2011		2022	
Ethnic group	Number	%	Number	%	Number	%	Number	%	Number	%	Number	%
White: Total	–	99.6%	4,908,140	99.1%	4,935,933	98.9%	4,960,334	97.99%	5,084,407	96.02%	5,051,875	92.87%
White: Scottish	–	–	–	–	–	–	4,459,071	88.09%	4,445,678	83.95%	4,226,965	77.70%
White: Other British	–	–	–	–	–	–	373,685	7.38%	417,109	7.88%	510,354	9.38%
White: Irish	–	–	–	–	–	–	49,428	0.98%	54,090	1.02%	56,877	1.05%
White: Gypsy/Traveller (Note: New category created for the 2011 census)	–	–	–	–	–	–	–	–	4,212	0.08%	3,343	0.06%
White: Polish	–	–	–	–	–	–	–	–	61,201	1.16%	90,736	1.67%
White: Other	–	–	–	–	–	–	78,150	1.54%	102,117	1.93%	163,600	3.01%
Asian, Asian Scottish or Asian British: Total	–	–	–	–	42,852	0.86%	71,317	1.41%	140,678	2.66%	212,022	3.90%
Asian, Asian Scottish or Asian British: Indian	–	–	–	–	10,050	0.20%	15,037	0.30%	32,706	0.62%	52,951	0.97%
Asian, Asian Scottish or Asian British: Pakistani	–	–	–	–	21,192	0.42%	31,793	0.63%	49,381	0.93%	72,871	1.34%
Asian, Asian Scottish or Asian British: Bangladeshi	–	–	–	–	1,134	0.02%	1,981	0.04%	3,788	0.07%	6,934	0.13%
Asian, Asian Scottish or Asian British: Chinese	–	–	–	–	10,476	0.21%	16,310	0.32%	33,706	0.64%	47,075	0.87%
Asian, Asian Scottish or Asian British: Asian Other	–	–	–	–	4,604	0.09%	6,196	0.12%	21,097	0.40%	32,187	0.59%
Black, Black Scottish or Black British (Note: Category restructured for the 2011 census)	–	–	–	–	3,707	0.07%	6,247	0.12%	–	–	–	–
African: Total	–	–	–	–	–	–	–	–	29,638	0.56%	58,636	1.08%
African: African, African Scottish or African British	–	–	–	–	–	–	–	–	29,186	0.55%	5,907	0.11%
African: Other African	–	–	–	–	–	–	–	–	452	0.01%	52,729	0.97%
Caribbean or Black: Total	–	–	–	–	–	–	–	–	6,540	0.12%	6,778	0.12%
Caribbean	–	–	–	–	–	–	–	–	3,430	0.06%	2,214	0.04%
Black	–	–	–	–	–	–	–	–	2,380	0.04%	546	0.01%
Caribbean or Black: Other	–	–	–	–	–	–	–	–	730	0.01%	4,018	0.07%
Mixed or multiple ethnic groups: Total	–	–	–	–	–	–	12,764	0.25%	19,815	0.37%	60,899	1.12%
Other: Total	–	–	–	–	8,825	0.18%	9,571	0.19%	14,325	0.27%	49,632	0.91%
Other: Arab	–	–	–	–	–	–	–	–	9,366	0.18%	22,304	0.41%
Other: Any other ethnic group	–	–	–	–	–	–	9,571	0.19%	4,959	0.09%	27,328	0.50%
Ethnic minority: Total	–	0.4%	46,188	0.9%	55,384	1.1%	106,146	2%	210,996	4%	387,967	7.1%
Total:	–	100%	4,954,328	100%	4,998,567	100.00%	5,062,011	100.00%	5,295,403	100.00%	5,439,842	100.00%

=== Ethnicity of school pupils ===
Ethnic group	School year									
Ethnic group	2004		2008		2012		2016		2021	
Ethnic group	Population	%	Population	%	Population	%	Population	%	Population	%
White: Total	671,029	92.7%	633,230	92.9%	622,722	92.8%	624,363	91.3%	624,821	88.7%
White: Scottish	663,007	91.7%	618,829	90.8%	579,136	86.3%	555,476	81.1%	537,004	76.2%
White: Other British	663,007	91.7%	618,829	90.8%	21,163	3.1%	34,580	5%	44,842	6.4%
White: Irish	–	–	–	–	–	–	–	–	1,499	0.2%
White: Polish	–	–	–	–	–	–	–	–	16,790	2.4%
White: Traveller/Gypsy	–	–	–	–	864		1,121		1,435	0.2%
White: Other	8,022		14,401		21,559		33,186		23,251	3.3%
Asian or Asian British: Total	15,053	2.1%	18,213	2.7%	21,955	3.3%	26,660	3.9%	33,161	4.8%
Asian or Asian British: Indian	2,163		2,825		3,930		5,378		7,442	1.1%
Asian or Asian British: Pakistani	8,683		9,850		11,430		12,980		14,771	2.1%
Asian or Asian British: Bangladeshi	473		541		714		908		1,359	0.2%
Asian or Asian British: Chinese	2,202		2,248		2,637		3,707		4,922	0.7%
Asian or Asian British: Asian Other	1,532		2,749		3,244		3,687		4,667	0.7%
African: Total	1,529	0.2%	2,815	0.4%	4,257	0.6%	6,555	0.9%	10,295	1.4%
African: African, African Scottish or African British	–	–	–	–	–	–	–	–	6,556	0.9%
African: Other African	–	–	–	–	–	–	–	–	3,739	0.5%
Caribbean or Black: Total	595	–	586	–	708	0.1%	1,033	0.1%	1,429	0.2%
Caribbean/Black: Scottish	105		126		–	–	–	–	930	0.1%
Caribbean or Black: Other	490		460		–	–	–	–	499	0.1%
Mixed: Total	4,814	0.6%	6,146	0.9%	6,956	1%	8,408	1.2%	11,533	1.6%
Other: Total	2,500	0.3%	3,005	0.4%	3,034	0.4%	5,250	0.7%	8,608	1.2
Other: Any other ethnic group	–	–	–	–	2,346		3,118		4,523	0.6%
Other: Arab	–	–	–	–	688		2,132		4,085	0.6%
Unknown or not stated	27,074	3.7%	16,467	2.4%	11,330	1.7%	11,939	1.7%	14,876	2.1%
Total:	723,175	100%	681,277	100%	670,962	100%	684,208	100%	704,723	100%

== National identity ==
Map showing the percentage of the population that identifies itself as "Scottish only" according to the 2011 census.

Map showing the percentage of the population that identifies itself as "Scottish and British" and "British only" according to the 2011 census.

A question on national identity was asked in the 2011 census: "what do you feel is your national identity?". Respondents could identify themselves as having more than one national identity.

In the 2011 census:

- 62% identified themselves as 'Scottish only'
- 18% identified themselves as 'Scottish' and 'British'
- 8% identified themselves as 'British only'
- 2% identified themselves as 'Scottish' together with other non-British identity
- 10% identified themselves with other national/ethnic identities only (neither Scottish nor British)

The council areas with at least 90% of the population stating some 'Scottish' national identity were North Lanarkshire, Inverclyde, East Ayrshire and West Dunbartonshire. The lowest proportions of people stating some 'Scottish' national identity were in Edinburgh (70%) and Aberdeen (75%).

The council areas with the highest proportions of people stating 'British' as their only national identity were Argyll and Bute and Shetland, each with 12%.

Below is a table of national identity sorted by council area based on the results of the 2011 census:

Council area	Scottish only	Scottish and British only	British only	Other UK identities	Scottish and any other identities	Other only
Aberdeen City	54.7%	17.7%	8.3%	4.7%	2.5%	12.1%
Aberdeenshire	61.3%	17.7%	9.0%	6.7%	1.9%	3.6%
Angus	66.8%	17.8%	7.2%	4.4%	1.6%	2.2%
Argyll and Bute	57.4%	17.2%	11.6%	8.9%	2.4%	2.4%
Clackmannanshire	67.0%	17.6%	7.4%	4.3%	1.6%	2.1%
Dumfries and Galloway	59.6%	16.7%	10.1%	9.7%	2.0%	1.8%
Dundee City	65.5%	16.6%	6.5%	3.6%	1.8%	6.1%
East Ayrshire	70.6%	18.7%	5.7%	2.9%	1.2%	0.9%
East Dunbartonshire	60.2%	24.7%	8.7%	2.7%	1.9%	1.8%
East Lothian	62.6%	18.9%	8.6%	4.6%	2.0%	3.0%
East Renfrewshire	59.0%	25.6%	9.4%	2.4%	1.9%	1.8%
Edinburgh, City of	48.8%	18.5%	11.4%	6.7%	3.2%	11.4%
Na h-Eileanan Siar	69.2%	14.3%	8.1%	5.4%	1.5%	1.4%
Falkirk	68.0%	19.7%	6.3%	2.7%	1.3%	2.0%
Fife	63.8%	18.2%	7.9%	5.1%	1.8%	3.2%
Glasgow City	61.9%	16.1%	8.6%	2.9%	2.2%	8.3%
Highland	61.5%	15.2%	10.2%	7.6%	2.3%	3.3%
Inverclyde	69.9%	19.7%	6.3%	1.9%	1.1%	1.1%
Midlothian	68.3%	18.2%	6.8%	3.2%	1.5%	2.0%
Moray	58.4%	15.9%	10.9%	10.0%	2.1%	2.7%
North Ayrshire	68.2%	19.4%	6.8%	3.2%	1.3%	1.1%
North Lanarkshire	71.6%	18.1%	5.9%	1.5%	1.2%	1.7%
Orkney	62.4%	13.8%	10.8%	9.8%	1.6%	1.6%
Perth and Kinross	59.0%	18.9%	9.5%	6.0%	2.3%	4.3%
Renfrewshire	65.9%	21.0%	7.3%	2.0%	1.3%	2.6%
Scottish Borders	57.7%	16.9%	10.7%	9.2%	2.6%	2.9%
Shetland	59.9%	15.7%	11.6%	7.6%	1.8%	3.4%
South Ayrshire	63.9%	21.0%	7.6%	4.3%	1.6%	1.6%
South Lanarkshire	67.2%	20.5%	6.9%	2.3%	1.3%	1.8%
Stirling	57.5%	20.0%	9.6%	5.8%	2.5%	4.6%
West Dunbartonshire	72.0%	17.3%	6.0%	2.0%	1.1%	1.5%
West Lothian	65.2%	18.8%	7.6%	3.4%	1.6%	3.4%

== Religion ==
Percentage claiming to be Roman Catholic in the 2011 census in Scotland

The statistics from the 2022, 2011 and 2001 censuses are set out below.

Current religion	2001		2011		2022	
Current religion	Number	%	Number	%	Number	%
Christianity	3,294,545	65.1	2,850,199	53.8	2,110,405	38.8
Church of Scotland	2,146,251	42.4	1,717,871	32.4	1,107,796	20.4
Roman Catholic	803,732	15.9	841,053	15.9	723,322	13.3
Other Christian	344,562	6.8	291,275	5.5	279,287	5.1
Islam	42,557	0.8	76,737	1.4	119,872	2.2
Hinduism	5,564	0.1	16,379	0.3	29,929	0.6
Buddhism	6,830	0.1	12,795	0.2	15,501	0.3
Sikhism	6,572	0.1	9,055	0.2	10,988	0.2
Judaism	6,448	0.1	5,887	0.1	5,847	0.1
Paganism (Note: New category created for the 2022 census)	—N/a	—N/a	—N/a	—N/a	19,113	0.4
Other religion	26,974	0.5	15,196	0.3	12,425	0.2
No religion	1,394,460	27.6	1,941,116	36.7	2,780,900	51.1
Religion not stated	278,061	5.5	368,039	7.0	334,862	6.2
Total population	5,062,011	100.0	5,295,403	100.0	5,439,842	100.0

== Languages ==
English is by far the most commonly spoken language in Scotland. Two regional languages of Scotland, Scottish Gaelic and Modern Scots, are protected under the European Charter for Regional or Minority Languages. Abilities in these languages for those aged three and above were recorded in the UK census 2021 as follows.

Ability	Scottish Gaelic		Scots	
Ability	Usual residents aged 3+	Proportion	Usual residents aged 3+	Proportion
No skills	5,164,702	97.54%	2,850,204	53.83%
Has some ability	130,161	2.46%	2,444,659	46.17%
Can speak	69,701	1.32%	1,508,540	28.49%
Speaks, reads and writes	43,807	0.83%	1,176,255	22.22%
Understands but does not speak, read or write	46,404	0.88%	722,593	13.65%
Speaks but does not read or write	18,264	0.34%	174,252	3.29%
Speaks and reads but does not write	7,630	0.14%	158,033	2.98%
Reads but does not speak or write	10,788	0.20%	193,302	3.65%
Other combination of skills	3,268	0.06%	20,224	0.38%
Total	5,294,863	100.00%	5,294,863	100.00%

Population of Scotland by ability in Scottish Gaelic, 1991–2022
Ability	1991 Census		2001 Census		2011 Census		2022 Census	
Ability	Usual residents aged 3+	Proportion	Usual residents aged 3+	Proportion	Usual residents aged 3+	Proportion	Usual residents aged 3+	Proportion
No skills			4,808,096	98.11%	5,031,167	98.30%	5,164,702	97.54%
Has some ability			92,396	1.89%	87,056	1.70%	130,161	2.46%
Can speak	65,978	1.37%	58,652	1.20%	57,602	1.13%	69,701	1.32%
Speaks, reads and writes	29,450	0.61%	31,218	0.64%	32,191	0.63%	43,807	0.83%
Understands but does not speak, read or write			26,722	0.55%	23,357	0.46%	46,404	0.88%
Speaks but does not read or write			19,181	0.39%	18,966	0.37%	18,264	0.34%
Speaks and reads but does not write	9,426	0.20%	7,934	0.16%	6,218	0.12%	7,630	0.14%
Reads but does not speak or write			4,744	0.10%	4,646	0.09%	10,788	0.20%
Other combination of skills			2,597	0.05%	1,678	0.03%	3,268	0.06%
Total	4,809,698	100.00%	4,900,492	100.00%	5,118,223	100.00%	5,294,863	100.00%

Population of Scotland by ability in Scots, 2011–2022
Ability	2011 Census		2022 Census	
Ability	Usual residents aged 3+	Proportion	Usual residents aged 3+	Proportion
No skills	3,188,779	62.30%	2,850,204	53.83%
Has some ability	1,929,444	37.70%	2,444,659	46.17%
Can speak	1,541,693	30.12%	1,508,540	28.49%
Speaks, reads and writes	1,225,622	23.95%	1,176,255	22.22%
Understands but does not speak, read or write	267,412	5.22%	722,593	13.65%
Speaks but does not read or write	179,295	3.50%	174,252	3.29%
Speaks and reads but does not write	132,709	2.59%	158,033	2.98%
Reads but does not speak or write	107,025	2.09%	193,302	3.65%
Other combination of skills	17,381	0.34%	20,224	0.38%
Total	5,118,223	100.00%	5,294,863	100.00%

Distribution of those who stated they could speak a regional language in the 2011 census
Scottish Gaelic

Scots

Over 170 languages are spoken in Scotland. The 4 most commonly spoken non-English languages at home (by people aged 3 and over) are: Scots (55,817), Polish (54,186), Chinese (27,381), and Urdu (23,394).

== Historical demography ==
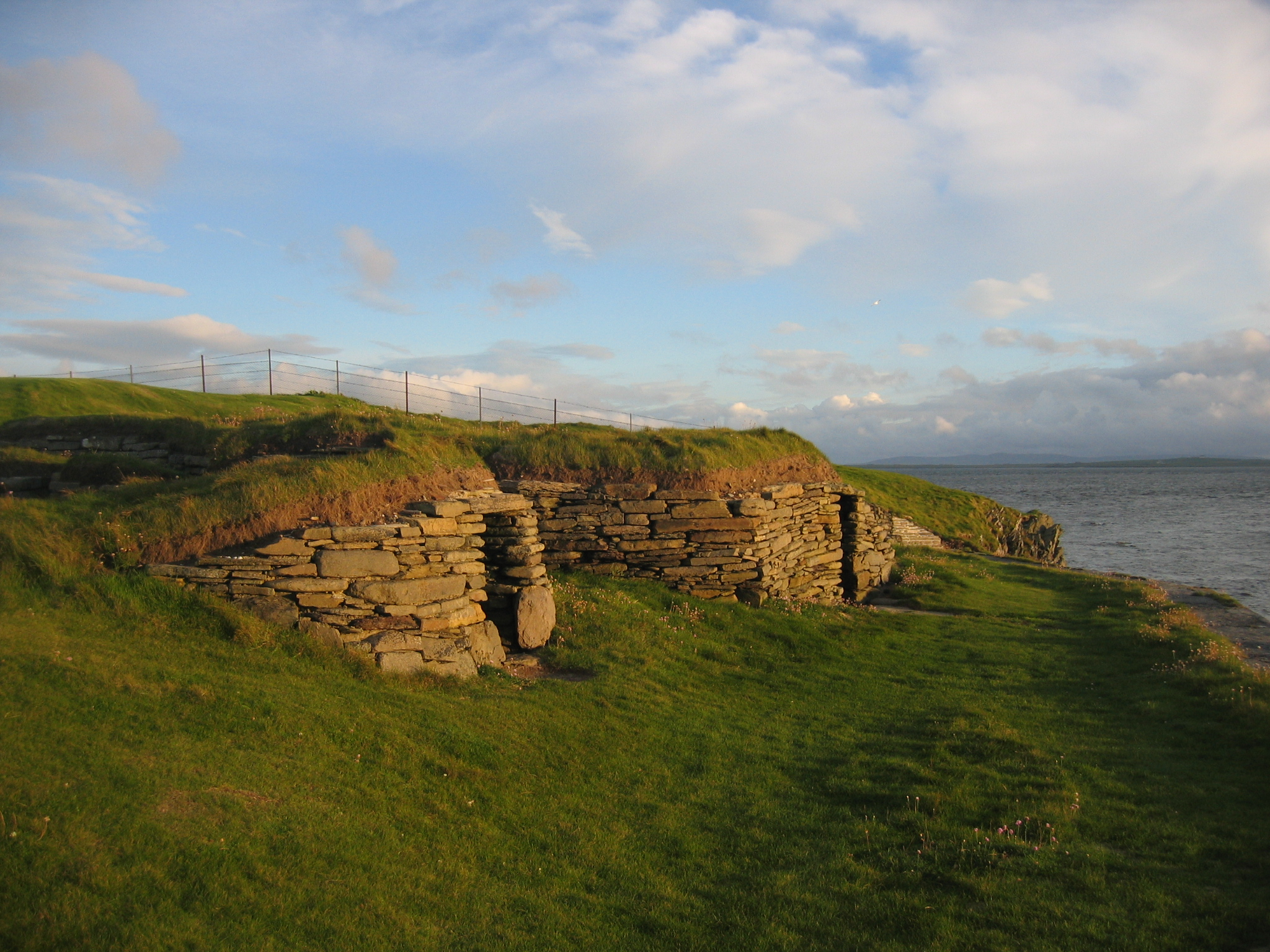
Stone houses at Knap of Howar, evidence of a settled agricultural population and the beginnings of demographic growth, c. 3500 BC

At times during the last interglacial period (130,000–70,000 BC) Europe had a climate warmer than today's, and early humans may have made their way to what is now Scotland, though archaeologists have found no traces of this. Glaciers then scoured their way across most of Britain, and only after the ice retreated did Scotland again become habitable, around 9600 BC. Mesolithic hunter-gatherer encampments formed the first known settlements, and archaeologists have dated a site near Biggar to around 8500 BC. Numerous other sites found around Scotland build up a picture of highly mobile boat-using people making tools from bone, stone and antlers, probably with a very low density of population. Neolithic farming brought permanent settlements, such as the stone house at Knap of Howar on Papa Westray dating from 3500 BC, and greater concentrations of population. Extensive analyses of Black Loch in Fife indicate that arable land spread at the expense of forest from about 2000 BC until the period of the first century AD Roman advance into lowland Scotland, suggesting an expanding settled population. Thereafter, there was re-growth of birch, oak and hazel for a period of five centuries, suggesting that the Roman invasions had a negative impact on the native population.

There are almost no written sources from which to re-construct the demography of early medieval Scotland. Estimates have been made of a population of 10,000 inhabitants in Dál Riata and 80–100,000 for Pictland, which was probably the largest region. This does not include figures for parts of Northumbria now in Scotland. It is likely that the 5th and 6th centuries saw higher mortality rates due to the appearance of bubonic plague, which may have reduced net population. The examination of burial sites for this period like that at Hallowhill, St Andrews indicate a life expectancy of only 26–29. The known conditions have been taken to suggest it was a high fertility, high mortality society, similar to many developing countries in the modern world, with a relatively young demographic profile, and perhaps early childbearing, and large numbers of children for women. This would have meant that there were a relatively small proportion of available workers to the number of mouths to feed. This would have made it difficult to produce a surplus that would allow demographic growth and more complex societies to develop. From the formation of the kingdom of Alba in the tenth century, to before the Black Death reached the country in 1349, estimates based on the amount of farmable land, suggest that population may have grown from half a million to a million. Although there is no reliable documentation on the impact of the plague, there are many anecdotal references to abandoned land in the following decades. If the pattern followed that in England, then the population may have fallen to as low as half a million by the end of the 15th century. Compared with the situation after the redistribution of population in the later clearances and the industrial revolution, these numbers would have been relatively evenly spread over the kingdom, with roughly half living north of the Tay. Perhaps ten per cent of the population lived in one of many burghs that grew up in the later medieval period, mainly in the east and south. It has been suggested that they would have had a mean population of about 2,000, but many would be much smaller than 1,000 and the largest, Edinburgh, probably had a population of over 10,000 by the end of the era.

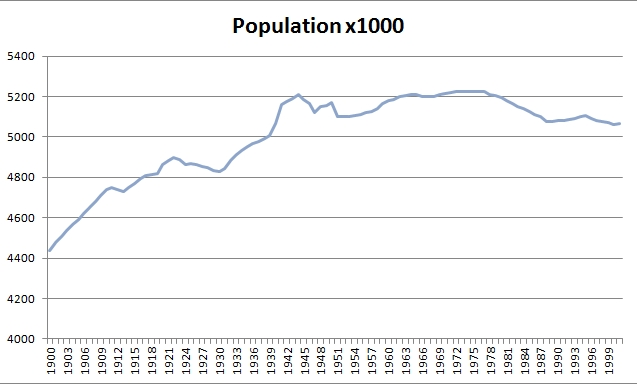
Graph showing the population of Scotland 1900–2001. Source: General Register Office for Scotland Birth and Mortality statistics from 1900

Calculations based on Hearth Tax returns for 1691 indicate a population of 1,234,575, but this figure may have been seriously affected by the famines of the 1690s. The first reliable information is a census conducted by the Reverend Alexander Webster in 1755, which shows the inhabitants of Scotland as 1,265,380. By the time of the first decadal census in 1801, the population was 1,608,420. Scotland grew steadily in the 19th century, to 2,889,000 in 1851 and 4,472,000 in 1901. Even with the growth of industry there were insufficient good jobs, as a result, during the period 1841–1931, about 2 million Scots emigrated to North America and Australia, and another 750,000 Scots relocated to England.

With a population of 4.8 million in 1911, Scotland sent 690,000 men to First World War, of whom 74,000 died in combat or from disease, and 150,000 were seriously wounded. Thus, although Scots were only 10 per cent of the British population, they made up 15 per cent of the national armed forces and eventually accounted for 20 per cent of the dead. While emigration began to tail off in England and Wales after the First World War, it continued apace in Scotland, with 400,000 Scots, ten per cent of the population, estimated to have left the country between 1921 and 1931. When the Great Depression hit in the 1930s there were no easily available jobs in the US and Canada and emigration fell to less than 50,000 a year, bringing to an end the period of mass migrations that had opened in the mid-18th century. This contributed to the growth of the population, which reached a peak of 5,240,800 in 1974. Thereafter it began to fall slowly, moving down to 5,062,940 in 2000. There was also a decrease in some urban populations as a result of policies of slum clearance, overspill and relocation to new towns, with the population of Glasgow falling from over a million in 1951 to 629,000 in 2001. Rural areas also saw a loss of population, particularly the Highlands and Hebrides.

== Population change ==
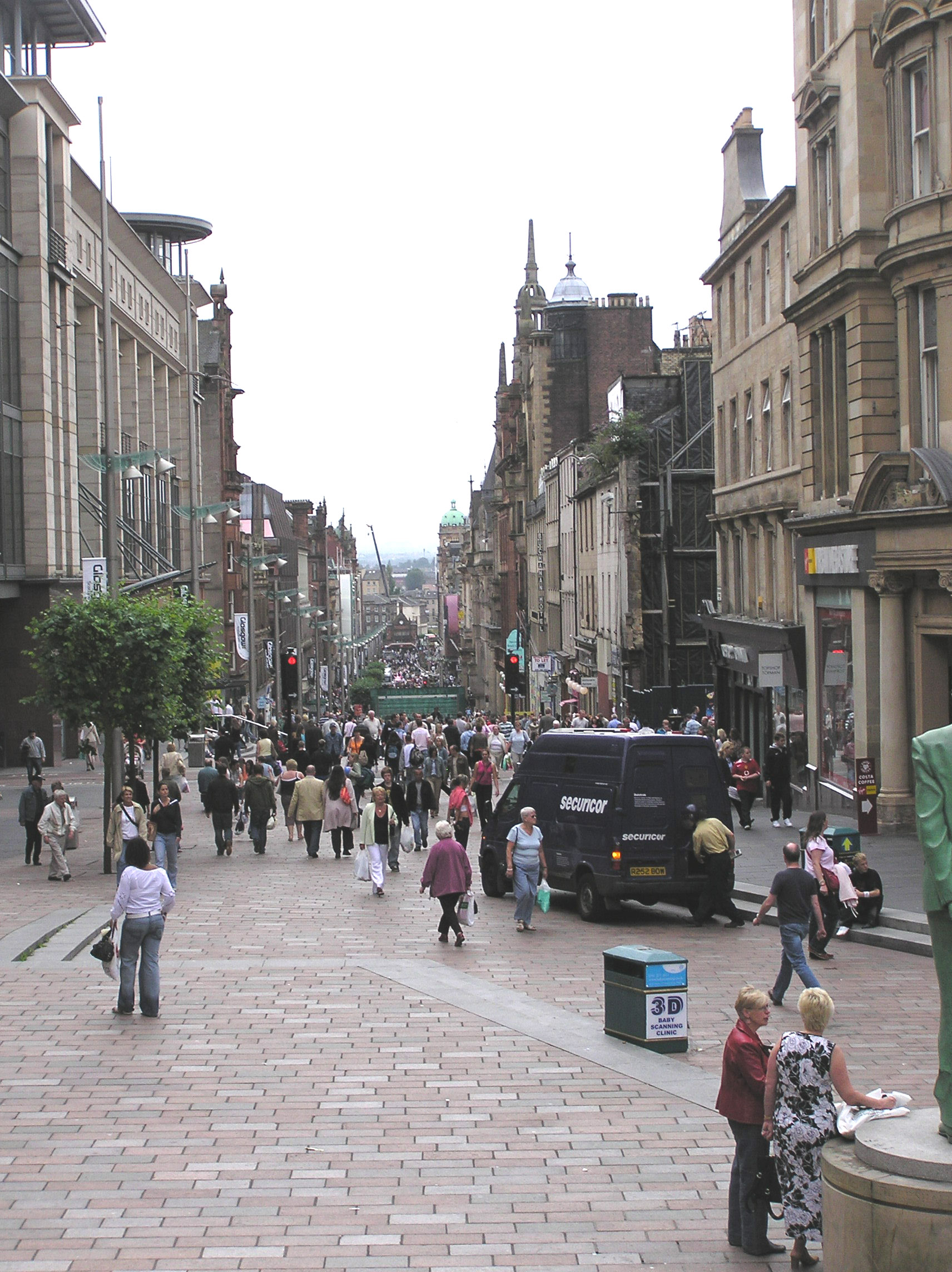
People on Buchanan Street in Glasgow. Scotland's population is getting older as many baby boomers approach retirement.

Scotland's population grew most years between the first census in 1855 up to around 5.2 million in 1974. However, from 1974 to 2000 there was a natural decrease in population, with both an excess of deaths over births and of emigration over immigration - particularly to the rest of the United Kingdom. Since 2000 the population has increased most years and is projected to peak in 2028 at 5.48 million and thereafter decline to 5.39 million in 2045.

=== Fertility and morbidity rates ===
Both the Scottish Government and leading academics in Scotland had expressed some concern over the historic falling annual number of births in Scotland. There were 49,863 live births registered in 2019, the lowest count since records began in 1855. In 2004, for example, there were 4,012 more deaths than births, although for the subsequent five years this process had been reversed with 4,342 more births than deaths in 2008. The long-term reversal in the declining birth rate of the 1990s was confirmed in 2009 when the Registrar General for Scotland reported that with 60,000 births recorded in 2008, this was the highest recorded fertility rate since 1995.

The population of children under age 5 grew by 6% (293,000) over the ten-year period between 2001 and 2011. However, the number of children aged 5–14 fell by 11% (69,000). The population of people over 65 also grew by 11% (85,000) and they now represent 17% of the total population and for the first time there are more people over 65 than under 15 years of age. Significantly, in 2011 there were 230,000 people over 80 years of age.

Fertility statistics

Live births per 1,000 women by age grouping in Scotland

Live births per 1,000 women in single year ages in Scotland

Stillbirth rate in Scotland over time

=== Migration ===
The 2021 United Kingdom census recorded 648,418 people who were born in Scotland but now living in England and Wales (1.1% of the total population). The South East of England (118,021 people), North West of England (89,025) and Greater London (75,004) were the three most popular destinations, together accounting for around 43% of the Scotland-born population in England and Wales. In the equivalent census conducted in 2022, there were 506,207 England-born and 18,219 Wales-born residents living in Scotland, for a total of 524,426 (9.6% of the total population). Politicians and academics also noted that in the first years of the 21st century the previous trend of a net migration away from Scotland had reversed with significant immigration to Scotland from the rest of the United Kingdom. Between 2001 and 2011 Scotland's population grew by 5% (233,000), the fastest rate of growth for at least 100 years. Similarly, since 2004 there had also been a growing influx of arrivals from the new EU accession states such as Poland, Czech Republic, Lithuania and Latvia, contributing to the recent growth of the population. Consequently, since 2002 the birth rate gradually increased with 53,957 births recorded in 2004, and in 2008 the number of live births was 60,041. Between 2001 and 2022, the number of non-UK born residents living in Scotland increased from 191,571 (3.8% of the total population in Scotland) to 554,883 (10.2% of the total population).

In 2005, the Scottish Government responded to these demographic trends by introducing the Fresh Talent - Working in Scotland Scheme open to foreign (non-EU) graduates from Scotland's universities allowing them a two-year residency period after graduation. The scheme ended in 2008.

=== Population projections ===
In its 2011 review the GROS predicted that Scotland's population would rise by 10% to 5.76 million by 2035 and to 6.2m by 2085. Until 2028 both net inward migration and the birth rate exceeding the death rate would contribute to this growth, however beyond this date population increase would be due only to a positive net migration as the ageing population would result in more deaths than births. This later trend would be dramatic with the number of children under 16 projected to rise by only 3% while the number of people over 65 is projected to increase by 63% (from 0.88m to 1.43m).

In its 2022 annual population review the National Records of Scotland projected that the Scottish population would continue to rise until 2028 - peaking at 5.48 million - and would then fall by 1.8% by 2045 to 5.39 million.

== Council area population estimates ==
Population map. Click rectangle to enlarge.

Scotland council area population estimates (2001 - 2022)
Local council area	Population (2001)	Population (2011)	% change (2001–11)	Population (2022)	% change (2011–22)
Aberdeen City	212,125	222,800	5.0	224,000	0.5
Aberdeenshire	226,871	253,000	11.5	263,900	4.3
Angus	108,400	116,000	7.0	114,400	−1.4
Argyll and Bute	91,306	88,200	−3.4	86,000	−2.5
Clackmannanshire	48,077	51,400	7.0	51,800	0.8
Dumfries and Galloway	147,765	151,300	2.4	145,900	−3.6
Dundee City	145,663	147,300	1.1	148,100	1.7
East Ayrshire	120,235	122,700	2.1	120,300	−2
East Dunbartonshire	108,243	105,000	−3.0	109,000	3.8
East Lothian	90,088	99,700	10.7	112,300	12.6
East Renfrewshire	89,311	90,600	1.4	96,800	6.8
City of Edinburgh	448,624	476,600	6.2	512,700	7.6
Na h-Eileanan Siar	26,502	27,700	4.5	26,200	−5.4
Falkirk	145,191	156,000	7.4	158,400	1.5
Fife	349,429	365,200	4.5	370,400	1.4
Glasgow City	577,869	593,200	2.7	620,700	4.6
Highland	208,914	232,100	11.1	235,400	1.4
Inverclyde	84,203	81,500	−3.2	78,400	−3.8
Midlothian	80,941	83,200	2.8	96,600	16.1
Moray	86,940	93,300	7.3	93,400	0.1
North Ayrshire	135,817	138,200	1.7	133,400	−3.4
North Lanarkshire	321,067	337,800	5.2	341,000	0.9
Orkney Islands	19,245	21,400	10.9	22,000	2.8
Perth and Kinross	134,949	146,700	8.7	150,800	2.8
Renfrewshire	172,867	174,900	1.2	183,800	5.1
Scottish Borders	106,764	113,900	6.7	116,900	2.6
Shetland Islands	21,988	23,200	5.3	22,900	−1.3
South Ayrshire	112,097	112,800	0.6	111,600	−1.1
South Lanarkshire	302,216	313,800	3.8	327,200	4.3
Stirling	86,212	90,200	4.7	92,600	2.7
West Dunbartonshire	93,378	90,700	−2.8	88,400	−2.5
West Lothian	158,714	175,100	10.3	181,300	3.5

== Other statistics ==
Sex ratio:
at birth: 1.04 male(s)/female
under 15 years: 1.04 male(s)/female
15-64 years: 0.94 male(s)/female
65 years and over: 0.88 male(s)/female
total population: 0.94 male(s)/female (mid-2011 est.)

Infant mortality rate: 4.1 deaths/1,000 live births (2011 est.)

Life expectancy at birth (2011):
total population: 78.4 years for those born in 2010 (cf. 72.2 in 1981)
male: 76.1 years for those born in 2010 (cf. 69.1 in 1981)
female: 80.6 years for those born in 2010 (cf. 75.3 in 1981)

General fertility rate: The general Fertility Rate (GFR) is based on the rate of births per 1000 females of child-bearing age (i.e. 15–44 years of age).

In 2011 it was 56.4 births per 1000 women. For comparison, during the latter part of the 20th century it was at its highest during the 'baby boom' of the 1960s. The GFR reached a peak of 99.5 births per 1000 women in 1962. In 2001 the GFR had fallen to its lowest post World War II level of 50 births per 1000 women.

Languages: English, Scots (including Doric, Central and Border) and Gaelic

Marriages: In 2011 there were 29,135 marriages in Scotland. This is a 2.3% increase on 2010.

By way of historical comparison, the highest ever recorded was 53,522 in 1940. In the 1970s there were on average between 40 and 45,000 marriages per annum. The lowest annual figure in recent years was 27,524 in 2009 and lowest on record was 19,655 in 1858.

Of specific interest were the number of so-called 'tourist marriages', where neither partner was resident in Scotland. In 2011 there were 6,829 such marriages, of which 48% took place at Gretna, the most popular of all wedding venues.

Civil partnerships: The Civil Partnership Act 2004 came into force in December 2005. In 2006 the number of civil partnership registrations was 1,047. A one-off figure given the number of long-standing relationships which already existed which could be registered. Since then the number of ceremonies each year fell from 688 in 2007 to 465 registrations in 2010. 2011 saw the first increase since 2006 with 554 registrations.

Literacy:
definition: age 15 and over can read and write
total population: 99%
male: 99%
female: 99% (2005 est)

Higher education: 95% of Scottish higher education students study in universities in Scotland.

== See also ==
- Demographics of the United Kingdom
- Demographics of England
- Demographics of Wales
- Demographics of Northern Ireland
- Demographics of Glasgow
- Politics of Scotland
- Scottish people
- New Scot
- Fresh Talent Initiative
- population
- United Kingdom Census 2001
- Italian-Scots
- Irish Scottish people
- List of census localities in Scotland
