= List of settlements on the island of Ireland by population =

This is a list of the 60 largest towns and cities on the island of Ireland by population. It therefore includes towns and cities in both the Republic of Ireland and Northern Ireland. The population figures listed are for the urban area around each settlement (for example, city including suburbs), excluding areas that fall within the boundary of another city or town. The figures for settlements in Northern Ireland are based on the preliminary 2021 Northern Ireland Census, while the figures for the Republic are based on the 2022 census. Settlements in bold have city status.

Rank	Settlement	Population	Province	County	Jurisdiction	Description
1	**Dublin**	1,263,219	Leinster	County Dublin	Republic	Capital city of the Republic of Ireland. Largest settlement on the island since the Middle Ages, except for a brief period around 1900. The figure here is for city including contiguous suburbs; the Greater Dublin Area has a population of 2,082,605.
2	**Belfast**	348,005	Ulster	County Antrim, County Down	Northern	Capital of Northern Ireland and largest city in all of Ulster. Home to Northern Ireland's devolved government and power-sharing assembly. Belfast received city status in 1888. Briefly Ireland's most populous city around 1900.
3	**Cork**	222,333	Munster	County Cork	Republic	Largest city in the province of Munster in the south of Ireland. Cork is one of Ireland's oldest cities, having received city status in the 900s.
4	**Limerick**	102,287	Munster	County Limerick, County Clare	Republic	Principal city of Ireland's Mid-West Region and second-largest city in Munster
5	**Galway**	85,910	Connacht	County Galway	Republic	Largest city in the province of Connacht
6	**Derry**	85,279	Ulster	County Londonderry	Northern	Second largest city in Northern Ireland and in Ulster
7	Newtownabbey	67,599	Ulster	County Antrim	Northern	Part of the Belfast Metropolitan Area. It was founded in 1958 to encompass many adjacent villages just outside Belfast.
8	**Bangor**	64,596	Ulster	County Down	Northern	Granted city status in 2022. Though a city in its own right, it is also part of the wider Belfast Metropolitan Area.
9	**Waterford**	60,079	Munster	County Waterford, County Kilkenny	Republic	Third-largest in the province of Munster. It is the island of Ireland's oldest surviving city, having been founded by Vikings in the 9th century AD.
10	**Lisburn**	51,447	Ulster	County Antrim, County Down	Northern	Granted city status in 2002. The city lies on the border between County Antrim and County Down, Ulster's two most populated counties. Though a city in its own right, it is also part of the wider Belfast Metropolitan Area.
11	Drogheda	44,135	Leinster	County Louth, County Meath	Republic	Largest town in the Republic of Ireland, located in County Louth with its southern environs located in County Meath
12	Dundalk	43,112	Leinster	County Louth	Republic	County town of County Louth
13	Swords	40,776	Leinster	County Dublin, Fingal	Republic	North Dublin suburban town and second-largest settlement in County Dublin. Forms part of the Greater Dublin Area. Lies both in the traditional County Dublin and since 1994, Fingal.
14	Navan	33,886	Leinster	County Meath	Republic	County town and largest settlement in County Meath
15	Bray	33,512	Leinster	County Wicklow, County Dublin	Republic	Most populous town in County Wicklow. An extremely small portion of the town is in County Dublin. Bray is considered part of the Greater Dublin Area.
16	Ballymena	31,119	Ulster	County Antrim	Northern	County town of Country Antrim
17	Newtownards	29,637	Ulster	County Down	Northern	
18	Lurgan	28,634	Ulster	County Armagh	Northern	Largest settlement in County Armagh
19	Carrickfergus	27,998	Ulster	County Antrim	Northern	Though a town in its own right, it is also part of the wider Belfast Metropolitan Area
20	Ennis	27,923	Munster	County Clare	Republic	County town and largest settlement in County Clare. Largest town in Munster.
21	**Newry**	27,913	Ulster	County Down, County Armagh	Northern	Granted city status in 2002, it is Northern Ireland's fifth-largest settlement
22	Carlow	27,351	Leinster	County Carlow	Republic	County town and largest settlement in County Carlow
23	**Kilkenny**	27,184	Leinster	County Kilkenny	Republic	County town and largest settlement in County Kilkenny, granted city status (now ceremonial) in 1609
24	Naas	26,180	Leinster	County Kildare	Republic	County town and largest settlement in County Kildare
25	Tralee	26,079	Munster	County Kerry	Republic	County town and largest settlement in County Kerry
26	Antrim	25,607	Ulster	County Antrim	Northern	Former county town of County Antrim
27	Coleraine	24,479	Ulster	County Londonderry	Northern	
28	Newbridge	24,366	Leinster	County Kildare	Republic	Second largest town in County Kildare
29	Balbriggan	24,322	Leinster	County Dublin	Republic	In the far north of County Dublin; forms part of the Greater Dublin Area
30	Portlaoise	23,494	Leinster	County Laois	Republic	County town and largest settlement in County Laois
31	Athlone	22,869	Leinster	County Westmeath	Republic	Largest settlement in County Westmeath
32	Mullingar	22,667	Leinster	County Westmeath	Republic	County town of County Westmeath
33	Letterkenny	22,549	Ulster	County Donegal	Republic	Largest settlement in County Donegal
34	Greystones-Delgany	22,009	Leinster	County Wicklow	Republic	Two adjacent settlements forming a single population cluster
35	Wexford	21,524	Leinster	County Wexford	Republic	County town and largest settlement in County Wexford
36	Portadown	21,097	Ulster	County Armagh	Northern	
37	Sligo	20,608	Connacht	County Sligo	Republic	County town of County Sligo, second largest settlement and largest town in Connacht
38	Celbridge	20,601	Leinster	County Kildare	Republic	Part of the Greater Dublin Area
39	Omagh	20,458	Ulster	County Tyrone	Northern	County town and largest settlement in County Tyrone
40	Larne	18,856	Ulster	County Antrim	Northern	
41	Malahide	18,608	Leinster	County Dublin, Fingal	Republic	Often considered a suburb of Dublin; forms part of the Greater Dublin Area. Households in Malahide have the highest median incomes of any measured population area in Ireland.
42	Clonmel	18,369	Munster	County Tipperary	Republic	Largest settlement in County Tipperary
43	Carrigaline	18,239	Munster	County Cork	Republic	Forms part of Metropolitan Cork
44	Banbridge	17,403	Ulster	County Down	Northern	
45	Maynooth	17,259	Leinster	County Kildare	Republic	Considered part of the Greater Dublin Area
46	Leixlip	16,773	Leinster	County Kildare	Republic	Sometimes considered a remote suburb of Dublin. Part of the Greater Dublin Area.
47	**Armagh**	16,308	Ulster	County Armagh	Northern	County town of County Armagh and ecclesiastical capital of Ireland in the Catholic and Church of Ireland.
48	Dungannon	16,282	Ulster	County Tyrone	Northern	
49	Ashbourne	15,680	Leinster	County Meath	Republic	Despite much commuting to Dublin, not officially part of the Greater Dublin Area
50	Laytown–Bettystown–Mornington–Donacarney	15,642	Leinster	County Meath	Republic	A set of semi-adjacent rural settlements; Mornington is sometimes considered a suburb of Drogheda.
51	Tullamore	15,598	Leinster	County Offaly	Republic	County town of, and largest settlement in, County Offaly
52	Killarney	14,412	Munster	County Kerry	Republic	
53	Cobh	14,148	Munster	County Cork	Republic	Part of Metropolitan Cork
54	Enniskillen	14,082	Ulster	County Fermanagh	Northern	County town and largest settlement in County Fermanagh
55	Midleton	13,906	Munster	County Cork	Republic	
56	Strabane	13,506	Ulster	County Tyrone	Northern	
57	Mallow	13,456	Munster	County Cork	Republic	
58	Arklow	13,399	Leinster	County Wicklow	Republic	
59	Castlebar	13,054	Connacht	County Mayo	Republic	County town and largest settlement in County Mayo
60	Wicklow	12,957	Leinster	County Wicklow	Republic	County town of County Wicklow

== See also ==
- List of urban areas in the Republic of Ireland
- List of localities in Northern Ireland by population
- List of places in Northern Ireland
- List of Irish counties by population
- List of towns and cities in England by population
- List of built-up areas in Wales by population
- List of towns and cities in Scotland by population
