= List of towns and cities in Scotland by population =

National Statistics Of Scotland

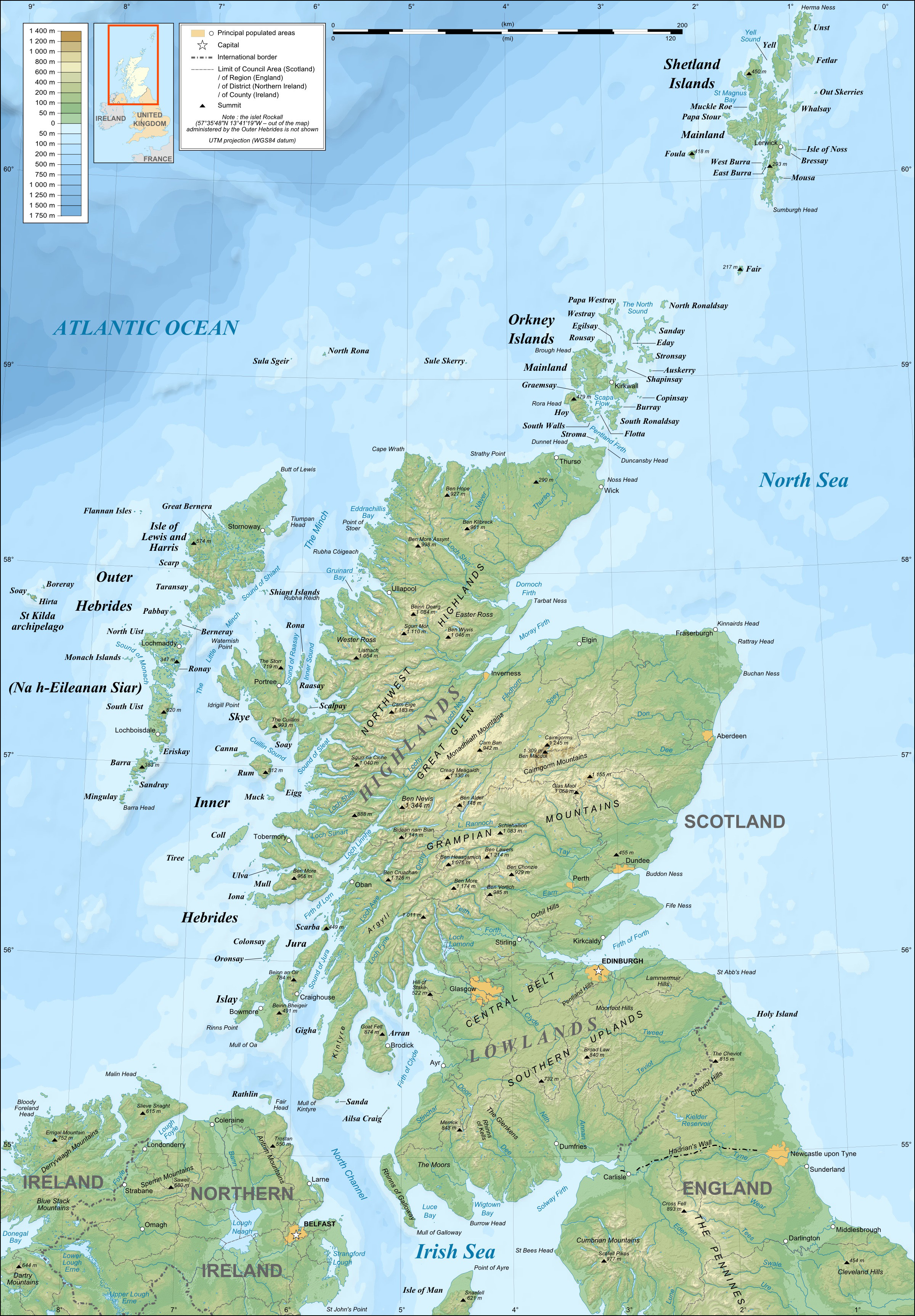
Map of Scotland showing some of the major towns and cities

This list of towns and cities in Scotland with a population of more than 15,000 is ordered by population, as defined and compiled by the National Records of Scotland organisation. Glasgow is the largest city in Scotland by population, whilst the capital city, Edinburgh, is the second largest by population and largest by area (although the Aberdeen and Edinburgh local authority areas contain far more undeveloped land and have a lower population density than the council areas of Dundee and Glasgow; these are the only four city-districts in the country). The city of Stirling has the smallest population amongst Scotland's cities, with an estimated population of just over 37,000 inhabitants. In total, Scotland consists of eight cities, with multiple larger towns, the largest town being Paisley.

The section "Localities" contains a list of basic populated areas ordered by population. The section "Settlements" is a list of populated urban areas, some of which are composed of more than one locality, and which may span across the boundaries of more than one council area.

All localities are either settlements themselves, or contained within larger settlements. As of 2020, there are 656 localities in Scotland, and 514 settlements (i.e. 142 of the localities combine as elements of larger settlements).

== Localities ==
In Scotland, "locality" refers to a populated area composed of contiguous postcodes with populations of at least 500. (Note: The definition as per National Records of Scotland does not always correspond to other definitions. For example, the adjoining East Renfrewshire localities of Busby, Clarkston, Netherlee, and Stamperland with a combined population of 21,270 are each counted separately, despite normally being unified as Clarkston. The same occurs in nearby Giffnock and Thornliebank. The total population for this agglomeration across its six NRS localities is 37,690. Conversely, the distinct villages of Easthouses and Newtongrange in Midlothian are not listed at all, presumably included in the figure of adjoining Mayfield; however, the smaller village of Newbattle is listed. Also noteworthy is Viewpark, which appears to include Birkenshaw and Tannochside under a single North Lanarkshire locality in this data.) The 52 localities with a population over 15,000 are listed below.

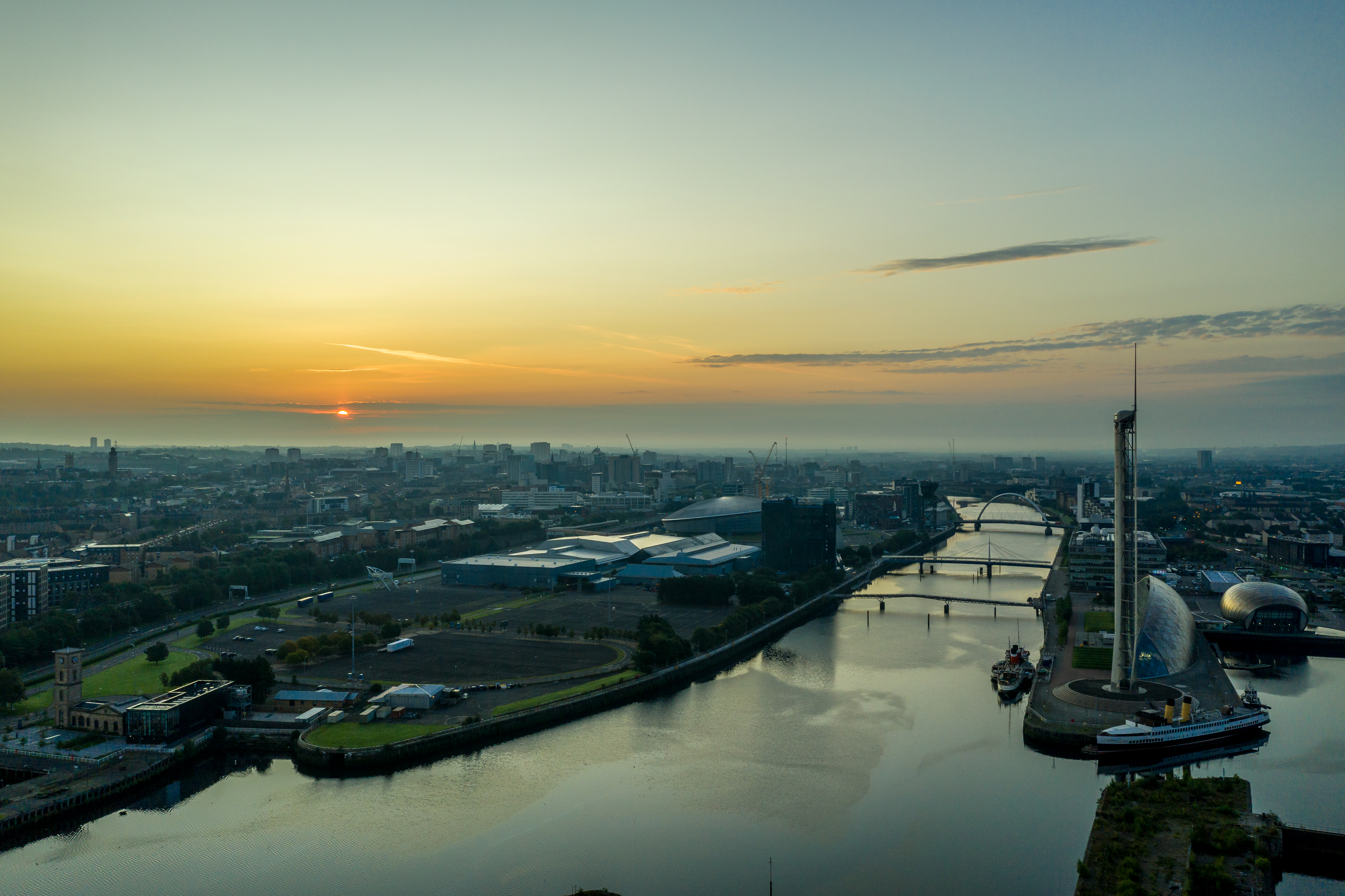
Glasgow is the most populous locality in Scotland, and also the largest city; Greater Glasgow is the largest settlement at 1.5 million.

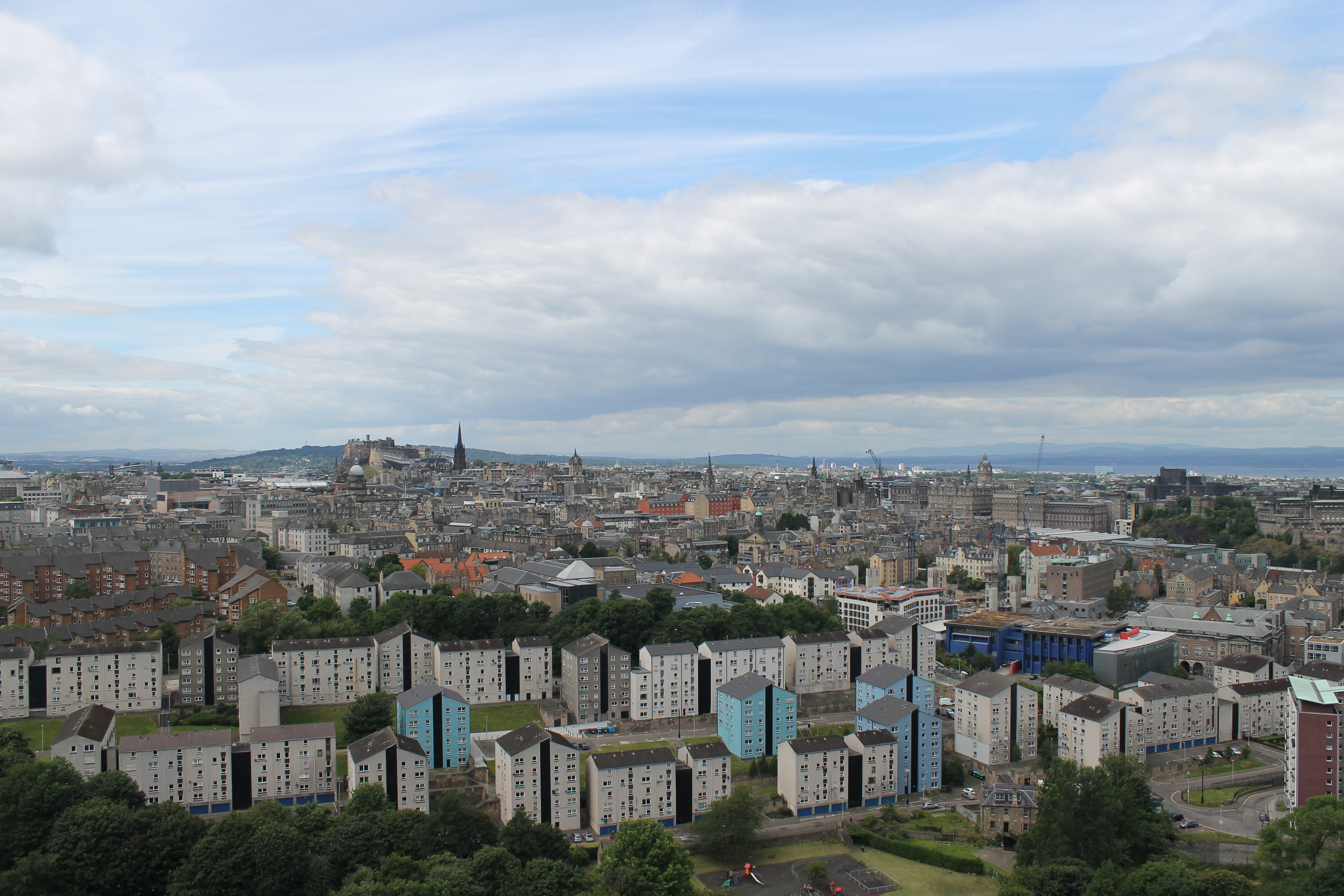
Edinburgh, the capital city, is the second largest locality and settlement by population.

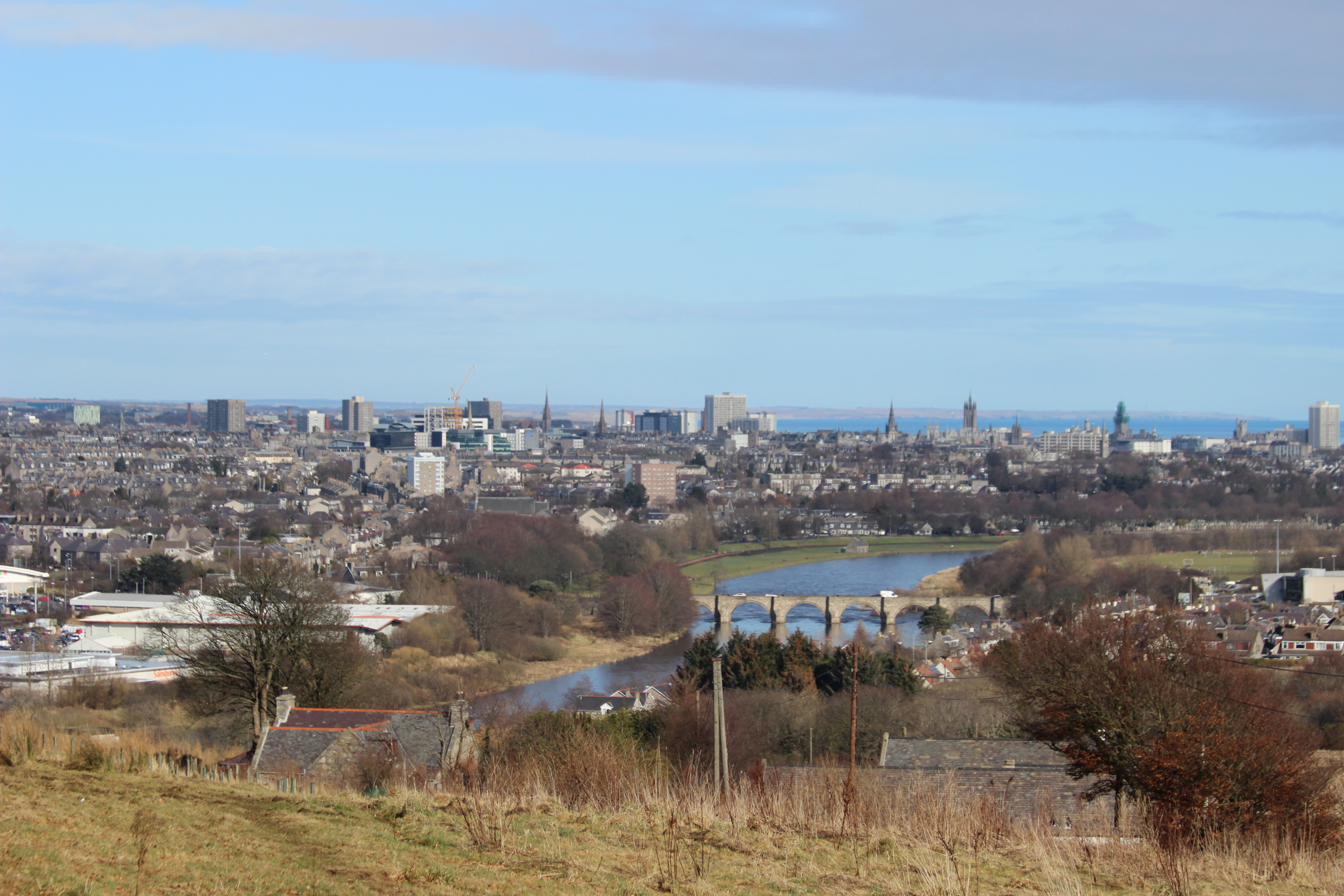
Aberdeen is both the third largest locality and settlement and largest city outside the Central Belt.

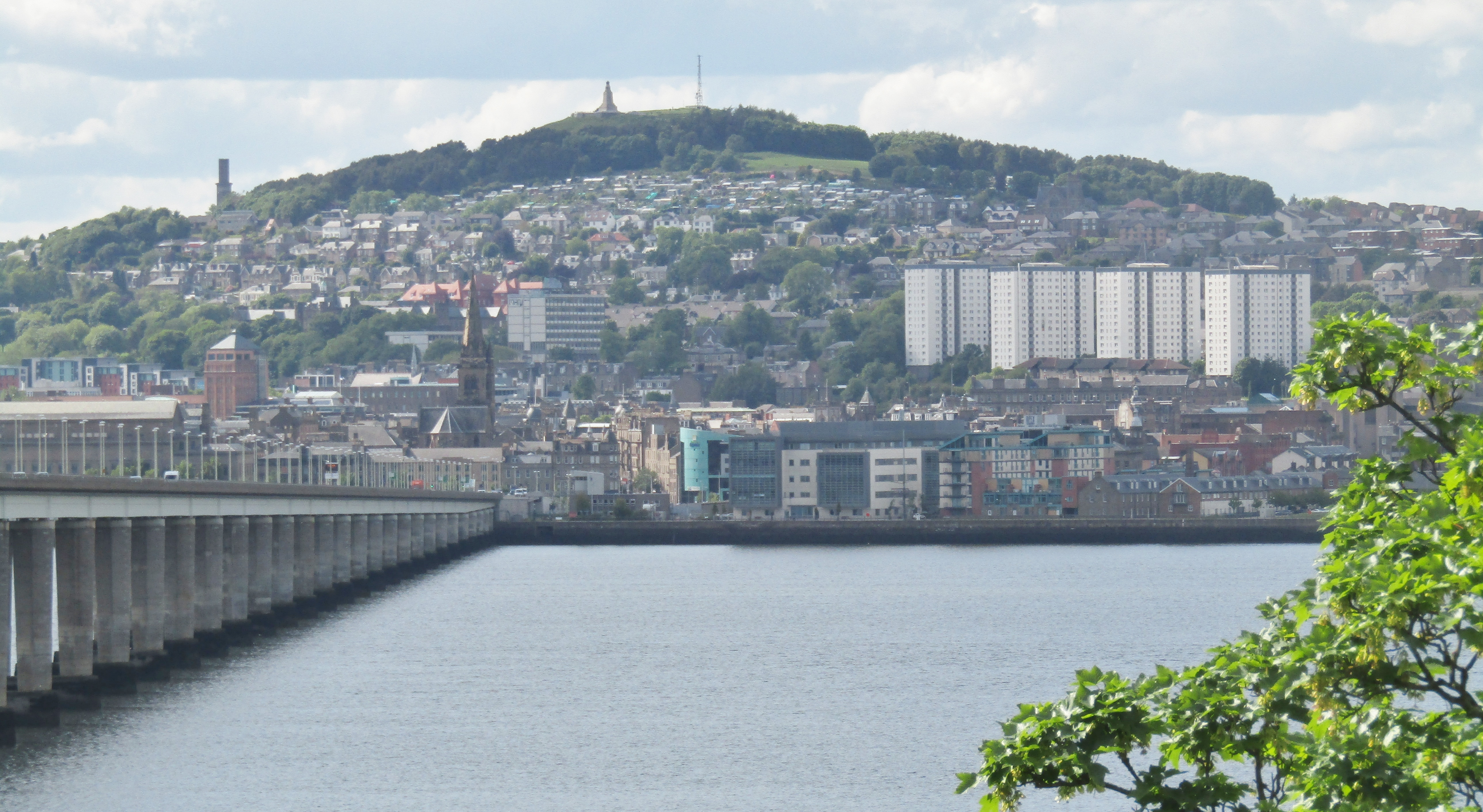
Dundee expanded rapidly in the Industrial Revolution on "jam, jute, and journalism"—skyline from Fife across the River Tay.

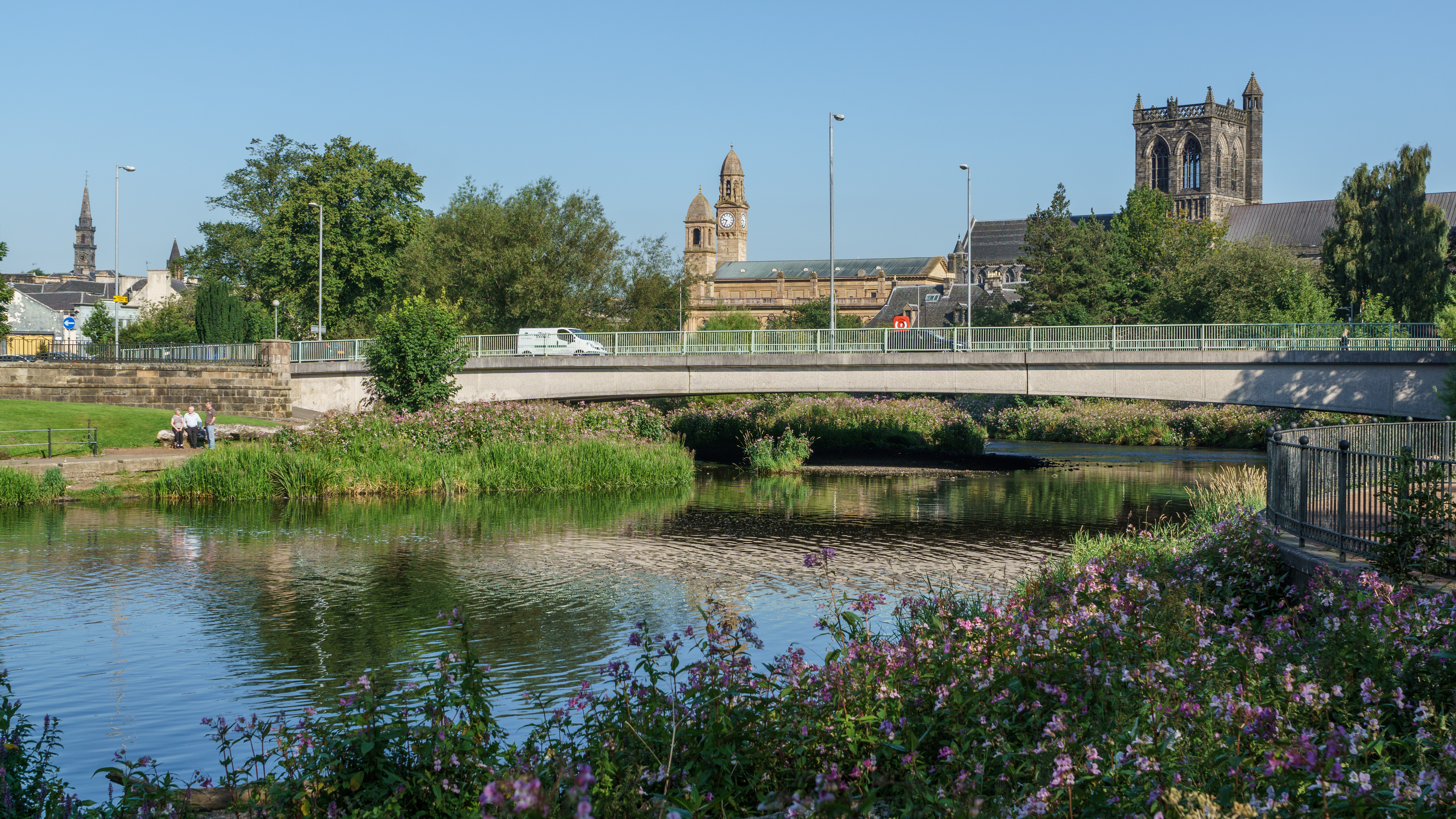
Paisley is the fifth most populous locality in Scotland, and the largest town by population.

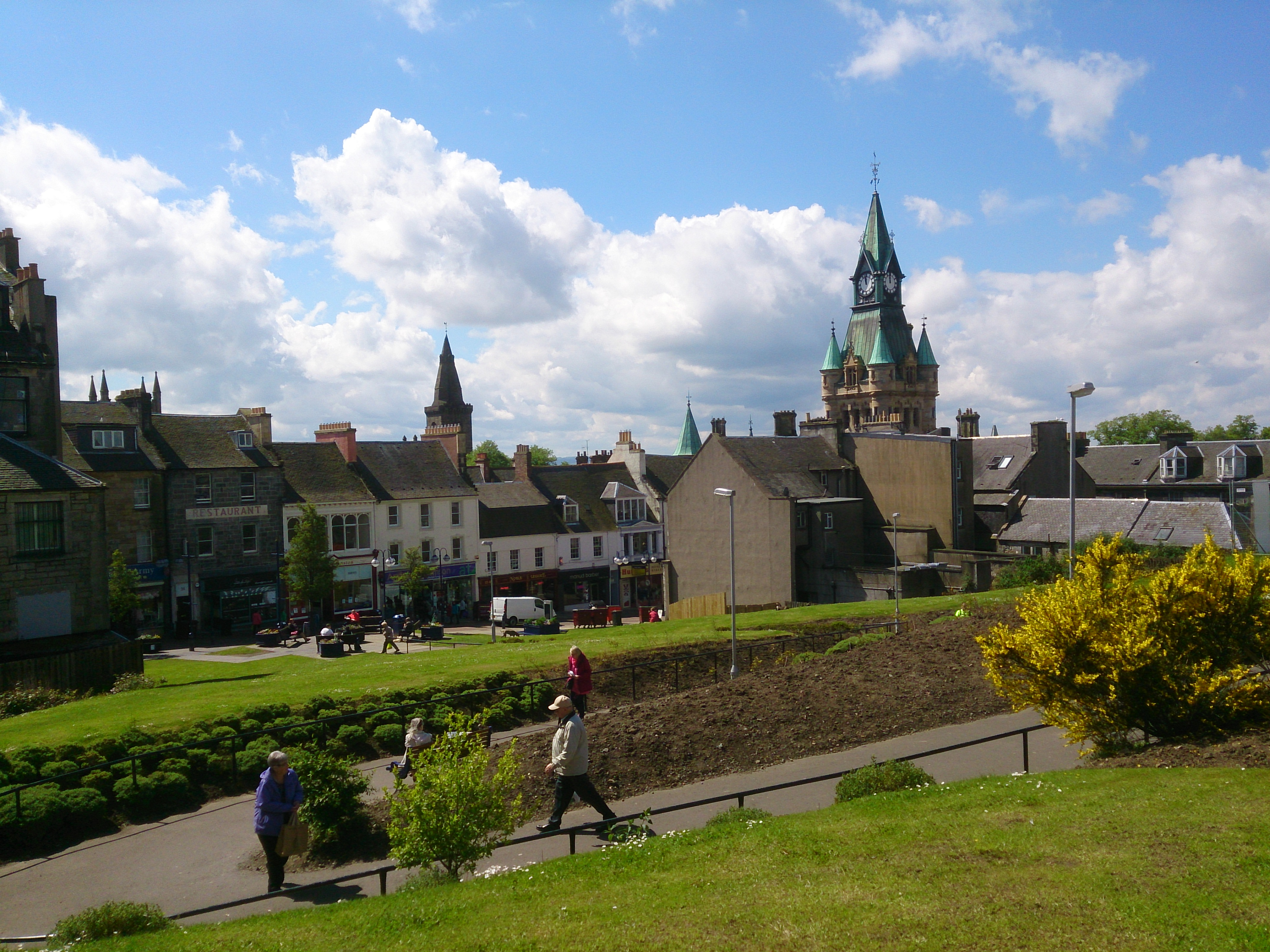
Dunfermline, the Auld Grey Toun, most recently created as a city in 2022—the High Street and City Chambers.

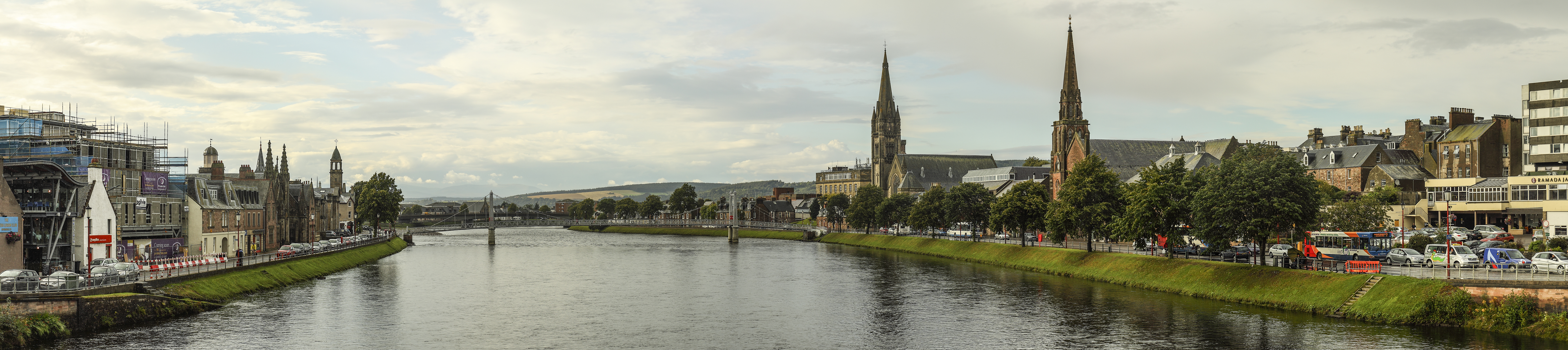
Inverness is the largest city in the Scottish Highlands— panorama looking downstream the River Ness to the Greig St. Bridge.

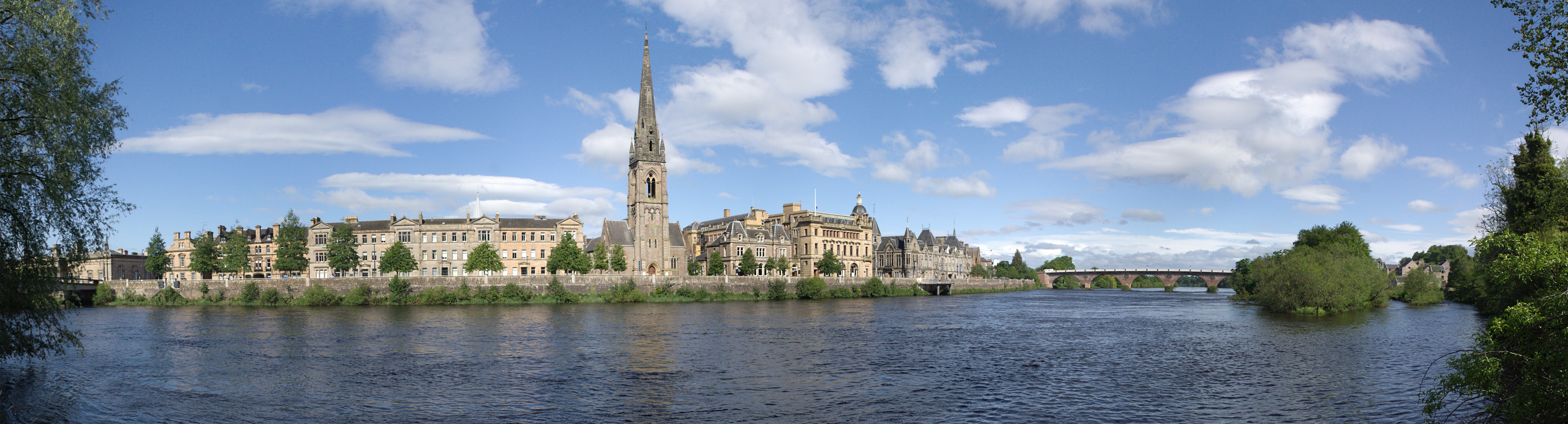
Perth, a royal burgh and city, accidentally demoted to a town from the late 1990s to its 2012 restoration—panorama of the city from the banks of the River Tay.

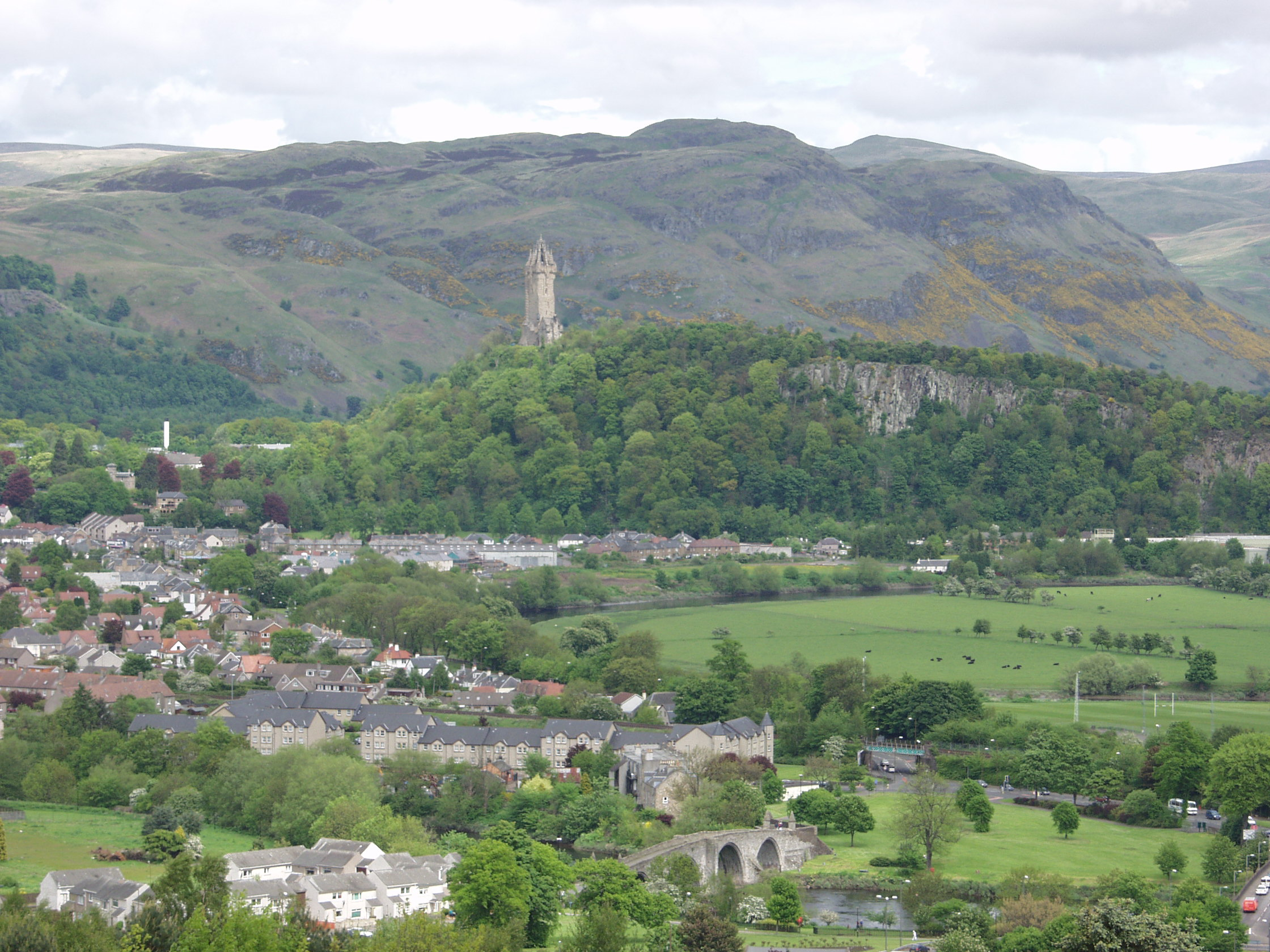
Stirling, the former capital, has the smallest population of Scotland's cities.

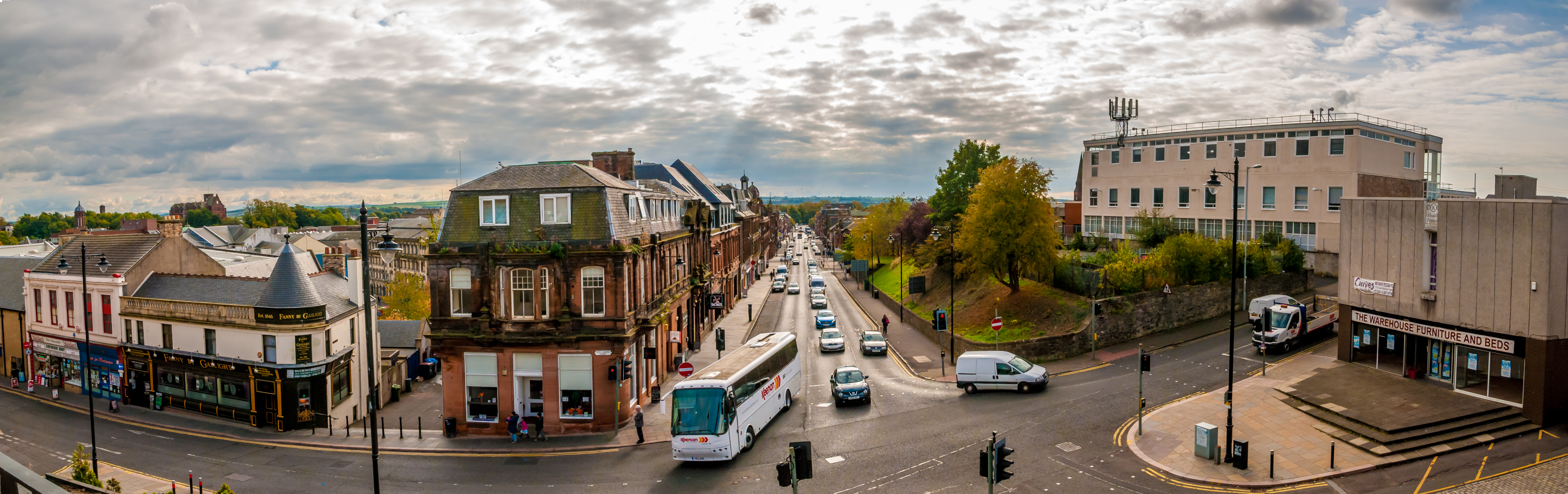
Kilmarnock is the 14th most populous locality in Scotland, and the largest south of the Central Belt.

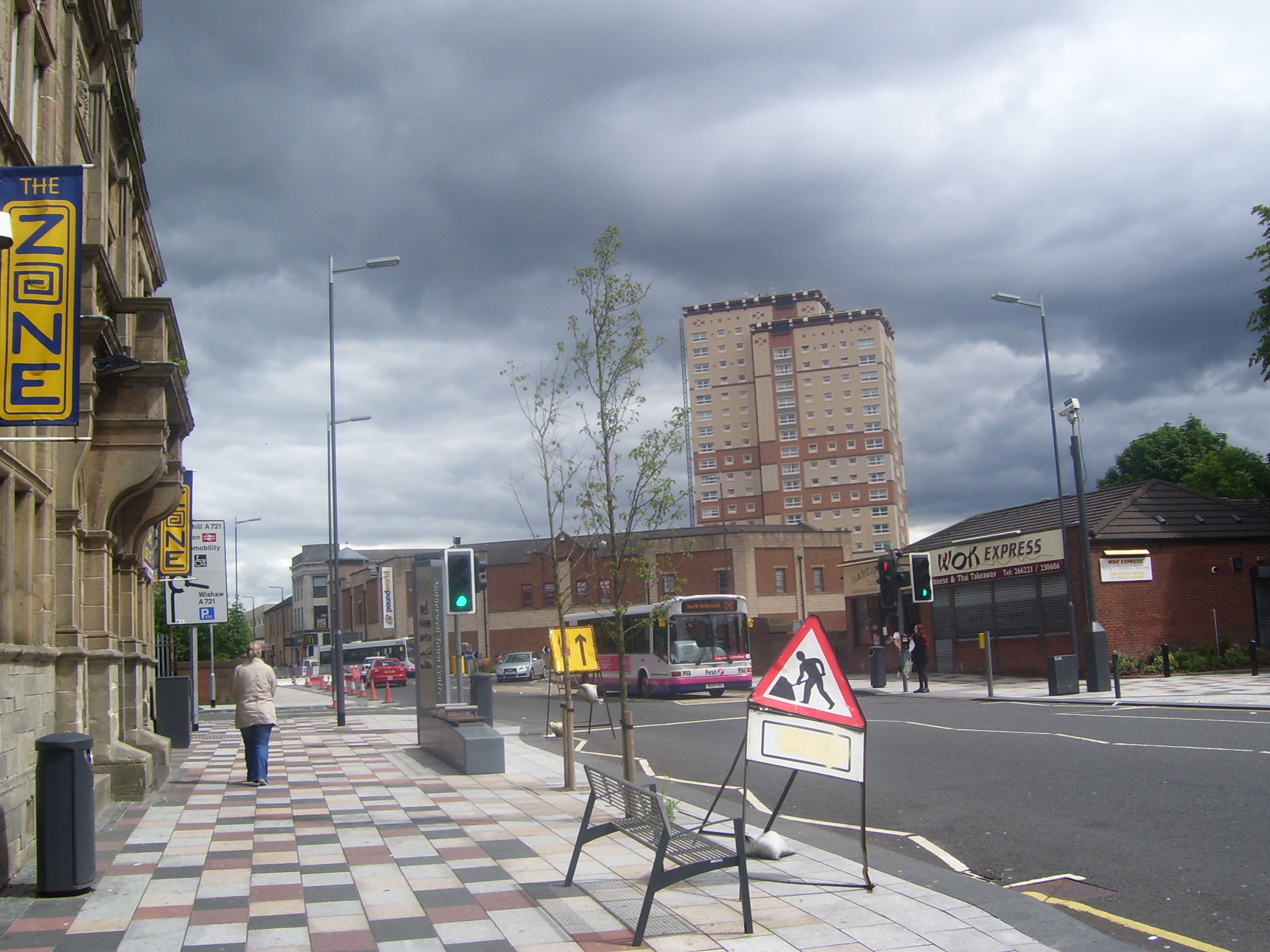
Motherwell is the 24th most populous locality, but anchors a defined settlement covering much of North Lanarkshire that is Scotland's 5th largest.

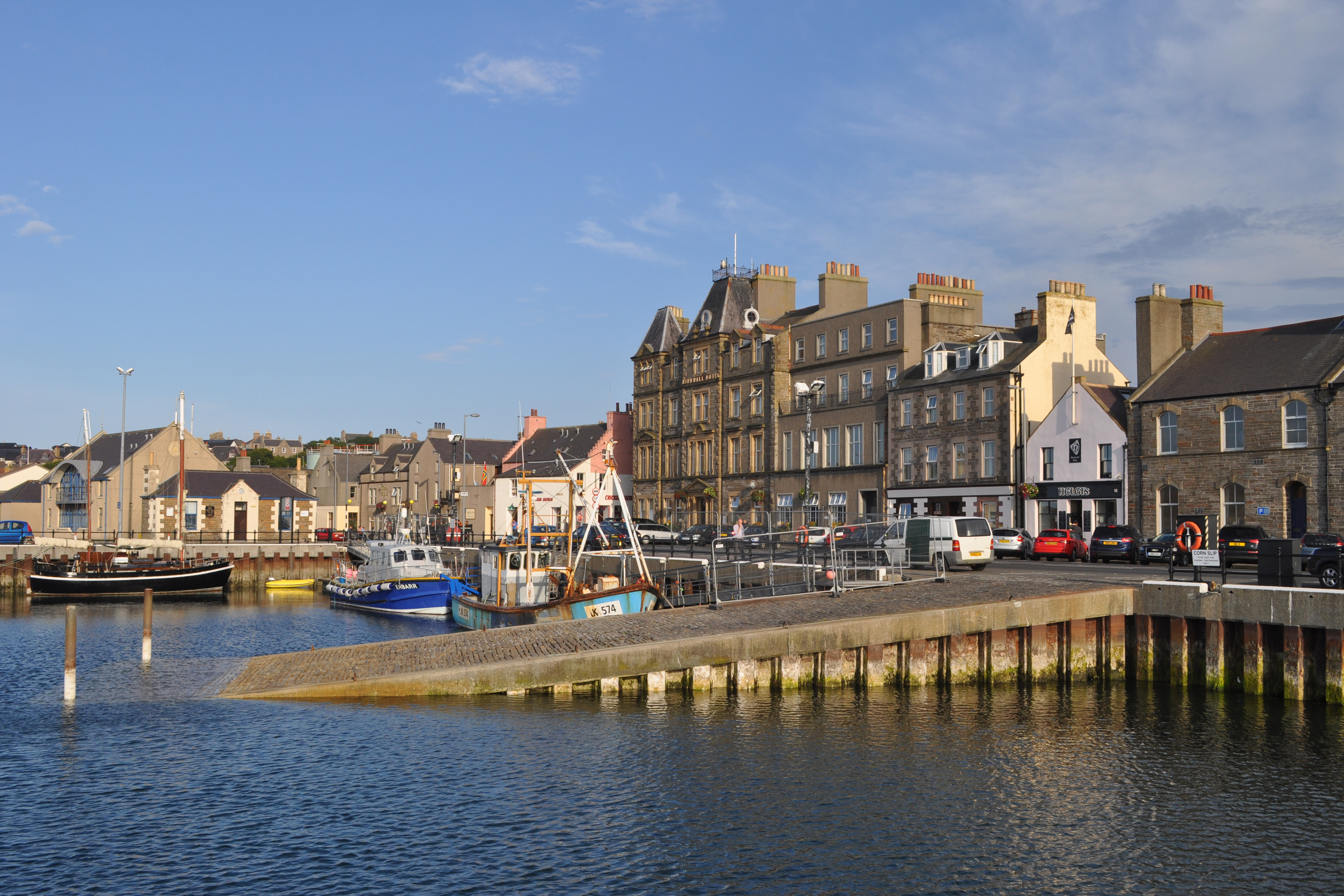
Kirkwall with a population of 10,000 is the largest urban area in the Scottish islands—the harbourside.

Rank	Locality	Population (2020)	Status	Council area	Historic County
1	Glasgow	632,350	City	Glasgow City	Lanarkshire
2	Edinburgh	506,520	City	City of Edinburgh	Midlothian
3	Aberdeen	198,590	City	Aberdeen City	Aberdeenshire
4	Dundee	148,210	City	Dundee City	Angus
5	Paisley	77,270	Town	Renfrewshire	Renfrewshire
6	East Kilbride	75,310	Town	South Lanarkshire	Lanarkshire
7	Livingston	56,840	Town	West Lothian	West Lothian
8	Dunfermline	54,990	City	Fife	Fife
9	Hamilton	54,480	Town	South Lanarkshire	Lanarkshire
10	Cumbernauld	50,530	Town	North Lanarkshire	Lanarkshire
11	Kirkcaldy	50,370	Town	Fife	Fife
12	Inverness	47,790	City	Highland	Inverness-shire
13	Perth	47,350	City	Perth and Kinross	Perth
14	Kilmarnock	46,970	Town	East Ayrshire	Ayrshire
15	Ayr	46,260	Town	South Ayrshire	Ayrshire
16	Coatbridge	43,950	Town	North Lanarkshire	Lanarkshire
17	Greenock	41,280	Town	Inverclyde	Renfrewshire
18	Glenrothes	38,360	Town	Fife	Fife
19	Stirling	37,910	City	Stirling	Stirlingshire
20	Airdrie	36,390	Town	North Lanarkshire	Lanarkshire
21	Falkirk	35,590	Town	Falkirk	Stirlingshire
22	Irvine	34,130	Town	North Ayrshire	Ayrshire
23	Dumfries	33,470	Town	Dumfries and Galloway	Dumfriesshire
24	Motherwell	32,840	Town	North Lanarkshire	Lanarkshire
25	Rutherglen	30,950	Town	South Lanarkshire	Lanarkshire
26	Cambuslang	30,790	Town	South Lanarkshire	Lanarkshire
27	Wishaw	30,050	Town	North Lanarkshire	Lanarkshire
28	Bearsden	28,470	Town	East Dunbartonshire	Dunbartonshire
29	Newton Mearns	28,210	Town	East Renfrewshire	Renfrewshire
30	Clydebank	25,620	Town	West Dunbartonshire	Dunbartonshire
31	Elgin	25,040	Town	Moray	Moray
32	Renfrew	24,270	Town	Renfrewshire	Renfrewshire
33	Bishopbriggs	23,680	Town	East Dunbartonshire	Lanarkshire
34	Bathgate	23,600	Town	West Lothian	West Lothian
35	Arbroath	23,500	Town	Angus	Angus
36	Kirkintilloch	21,870	Town	East Dunbartonshire	Dunbartonshire
37	Musselburgh	21,100	Town	East Lothian	Midlothian
38	Dumbarton	20,480	Town	West Dunbartonshire	Dunbartonshire
39	Bellshill	19,700	Town	North Lanarkshire	Lanarkshire
40	Peterhead	19,060	Town	Aberdeenshire	Aberdeenshire
41	St Andrews	18,410	Town	Fife	Fife
42	Bonnyrigg	18,320	Town	Midlothian	Midlothian
43	Barrhead	17,890	Town	East Renfrewshire	Renfrewshire
44	Blantyre	16,800	Town	South Lanarkshire	Lanarkshire
45	Penicuik	16,150	Town	Midlothian	Midlothian
46	Grangemouth	16,120	Town	Falkirk	Stirlingshire
47	Kilwinning	16,100	Town	North Ayrshire	Ayrshire
48	Broxburn	15,970	Town	West Lothian	West Lothian
49	Johnstone	15,930	Town	Renfrewshire	Renfrewshire
50	Viewpark	15,830	Town	North Lanarkshire	Lanarkshire
51	Larkhall	15,030	Town	South Lanarkshire	Lanarkshire
52	Erskine	15,010	Town	Renfrewshire	Renfrewshire

== Settlements ==
In Scotland, 'settlement' refers to a collection of contiguous high density postcodes bounded by low density postcodes whose population was 500 or more. For example, the area of Ayr includes the adjoining localities of Ayr, Monkton and Prestwick. (Note: The definition as per National Records of Scotland does not always correspond to other definitions. For example, the Greater Glasgow settlement under NRS stretches as far as Bowling, Kilbarchan and Newton Mearns due to the continuous chain of populated postcodes, but does not encompass places as close as Bargeddie, Chryston, Erskine, Kirkintilloch or Uddingston due to small gaps in this chain. If these gaps were counted, Greater Glasgow would extend as far as Ferniegair, Wishaw, Neilston, Denny, Airdrie and Bishopton. In other examples, Cleland, Gowkthrapple and Overtown are not included in the wider NRS 'Motherwell & Wishaw' settlement while distinct towns such as Bellshill and Viewpark are included, and Inverkeithing and Rosyth are counted in the Dunfermline settlement but Dalgety Bay is not.) However, most settlements coincide to a single locality. The 43 settlements with a population over 15,000 are listed below.

Rank	Urban sub-area	Population (2020)	Localities (Note: As named, defined and grouped by NRS in Localities list above.)	Council areas
1	Greater Glasgow	1,028,220	Barrhead, Bearsden, Bishopbriggs, Bowling, Brookfield, Busby, Cambuslang, Clarkston, Clydebank, Duntocher & Hardgate, Elderslie, Faifley, Giffnock, Glasgow, Johnstone, Kilbarchan, Linwood, Milngavie, Netherlee, Newton Mearns, Old Kilpatrick, Paisley, Renfrew, Rutherglen, Stamperland, Stepps, Thornliebank	Glasgow City, (Note: Does not include Carmunnock or Gartloch.) East Dunbartonshire, East Renfrewshire, North Lanarkshire, Renfrewshire, South Lanarkshire, West Dunbartonshire
2	Edinburgh	530,990	Edinburgh, Musselburgh, Wallyford	City of Edinburgh, (Note: Does not include Kirkliston, Newbridge & Ratho Station, Ratho or South Queensferry.) East Lothian
3	Aberdeen	220,690	Aberdeen, Cove Bay, Dyce, Milltimber, Peterculter	Aberdeen City (Note: Does not include Kingswells.)
4	Dundee	158,820	Dundee, Monifieth, Invergowrie	Dundee City, Angus, Perth and Kinross
5	Motherwell & Wishaw	125,610	Bellshill, Carfin, Holytown, Motherwell, New Stevenston, Newarthill, Newmains, Viewpark, Wishaw	North Lanarkshire
6	Falkirk	103,380	Brightons, Carron, Carronshore, Falkirk (Note: Does not include Glen Village/Hallglen.), Grangemouth, Larbert, Laurieston, Maddiston, Polmont, Redding, Reddingmuirhead, Rumford, Stenhousemuir, Wallacestone, Westquarter	Falkirk
7	Coatbridge & Airdrie (Note: Often known collectively as Monklands but not referred to as such by NRS.)	90,690	Airdrie, Bargeddie, Chapelhall, Coatbridge	North Lanarkshire
8	Hamilton	84,450	Blantyre, Bothwell, Hamilton, Uddingston	South Lanarkshire
9	Dunfermline	76,210	Crossgates, Dunfermline, Inverkeithing, Rosyth	Fife
10	East Kilbride	75,310	East Kilbride	South Lanarkshire
11	Livingston	65,770	Livingston, Mid Calder, Polbeth, West Calder	West Lothian
12	Greenock	65,690	Gourock, Greenock, Port Glasgow	Inverclyde
13	Inverness	63,730	Balloch, Culloden, Milton of Leys, Inverness, Smithton, Westhill	Highland
14	Ayr	62,270	Ayr, Monkton, Prestwick	South Ayrshire
15	Bonnyrigg, Dalkeith & Gorebridge	54,940	Bonnyrigg, Dalkeith, Gorebridge, Mayfield, (Note: Mayfield with Easthouses and Newtongrange) Newbattle	Midlothian
16	Cumbernauld	52,420	Croy, Cumbernauld	North Lanarkshire
17	Kilmarnock	51,370	Crookedholm, Hurlford, Kilmarnock	East Ayrshire
18	Kirkcaldy	50,370	Kirkcaldy & Dysart	Fife
19	Stirling	49,950	Bannockburn, Bridge of Allan, Stirling	Stirling
20	Perth	47,350	Perth	Perth and Kinross
21	Glenrothes	44,760	Coaltown of Balgonie, Glenrothes, Leslie, Markinch, Thornton	Fife
22	Irvine	37,580	Dreghorn, Irvine	North Ayrshire
23	Dumfries	34,040	Dumfries	Dumfries and Galloway
24	Saltcoats (Note: Often known collectively as the Three Towns but not referred to as such by NRS.)	31,800	Ardrossan, Saltcoats, Stevenston	North Ayrshire
25	Methil, Leven & Buckhaven (Note: Often known collectively as Levenmouth but not referred to as such by NRS.)	30,730	Buckhaven, Kennoway, Leven, Methil, Windygates	Fife
26	Kirkintilloch	29,960	Kirkintilloch, Lenzie	East Dunbartonshire
27	Bathgate	29,330	Bathgate, Blackburn	West Lothian
28	Bonnybridge (Note: Denny is the settlement's largest locality but Bonnybridge is the name chosen by NRS.)	25,710	Banknock, Bonnybridge, Denny, Dennyloanhead, Dunipace, Greenhill, Haggs, Head of Muir, High Bonnybridge, Longcroft	Falkirk
29	Elgin	25,040	Elgin	Moray
30	Vale of Leven	24,130	Alexandria, Balloch & Haldane, Bonhill, Renton	West Dunbartonshire
31	Arbroath	23,500	Arbroath	Angus
32	Dumbarton	21,030	Dumbarton, Milton	West Dunbartonshire
33	Alloa	20,750	Alloa, Sauchie	Clackmannanshire
34	Cowdenbeath	19,330	Cowdenbeath, Lochgelly, Lumphinnans	Fife
35	Peterhead	19,060	Peterhead	Aberdeenshire
36	St Andrews	18,410	St Andrews	Fife
37	Erskine	16,830	Erskine, Inchinnan	Renfrewshire
38	Larkhall	16,400	Ashgill, Larkhall	South Lanarkshire
39	Penicuik	16,150	Penicuik	Midlothian
40	Kilwinning	16,100	Kilwinning	North Ayrshire
41	Broxburn	15,970	Broxburn	West Lothian
42	Galashiels	15,490	Galashiels, Langlee, Tweedbank	Scottish Borders
43	Helensburgh	15,160	Helensburgh, Rhu	Argyll and Bute

== See also ==
- Local government in Scotland
- Subdivisions of Scotland
- List of towns and cities in England by population
- List of built-up areas in Wales by population
- List of settlements on the island of Ireland by population
