= Alexander Webster =

Scottish writer and minister

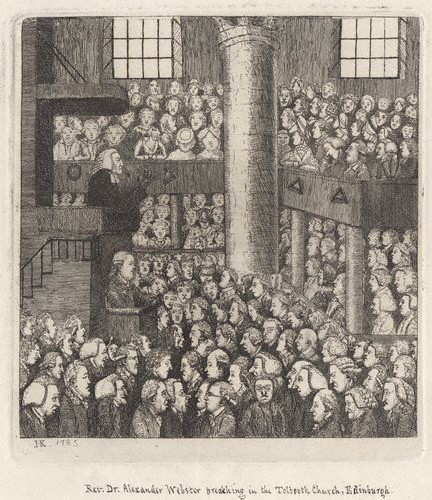
Caricature (published 1785) by John Kay depicting Alexander Webster preaching to a congregation filled with people notorious for never coming to church.

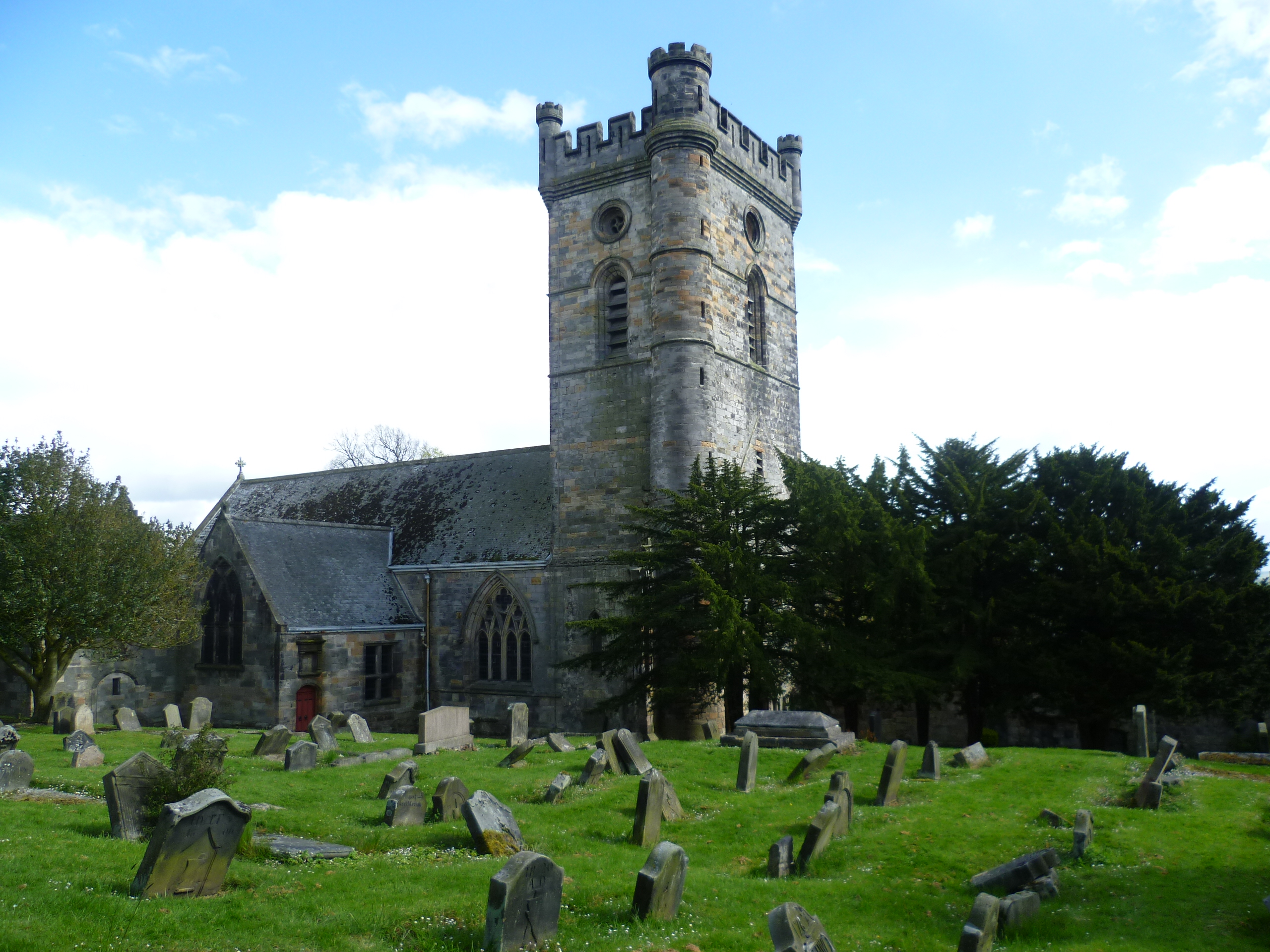
Culross Parish Church, Fife

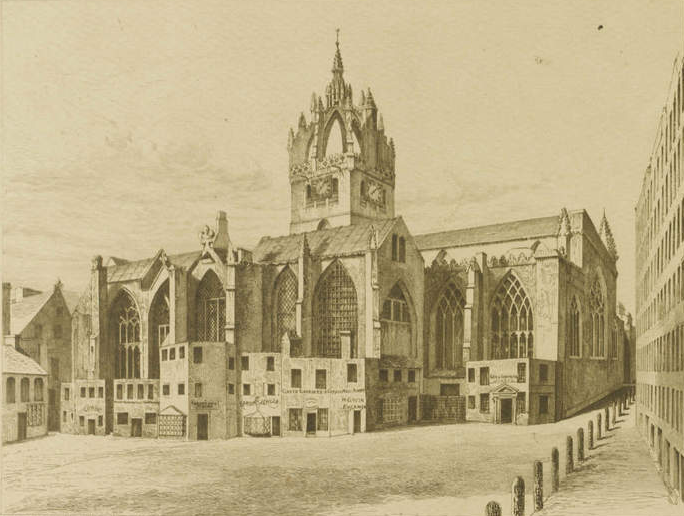
St Giles' from Parliament Square

Alexander Webster (1707 – 25 January 1784) was a Scottish writer and minister of the Church of Scotland, who served as Moderator of the General Assembly of the Church of Scotland in 1753. After his service as Moderator he was addressed as Very Rev Dr Alexander Webster.

== Life ==
He was born in Edinburgh in 1707, the son of Rev James Webster, second charge of Tolbooth parish in St Giles Cathedral and a covenanting minister, originally from Fife. Alexander was educated at the High School of Edinburgh then studied at Edinburgh University. He was licensed to preach by the Presbytery of Haddington in March 1733.

In September 1733 Alexander was ordained as minister of the Church of Scotland at Culross Parish Church in western Fife. On 2 June 1737 he was translated to Tolbooth parish, one of the four parishes contained in St Giles Cathedral in Edinburgh.

He propounded a scheme in 1742 for providing pensions for the widows of ministers. The tables which he drew up from information obtained from all the presbyteries of Scotland were based on a system of actuarial calculation that supplied a precedent followed by insurance companies in modern times for reckoning averages of longevity.

Webster published in 1748 his Calculations, setting forth the principles on which his scheme for widows' pensions was based; he also wrote a defence of the Methodist movement in 1742, and Zeal for the Civil and Religious Interests of Mankind Commended (1754).

In 1755, the government commissioned Webster to obtain data for the first census of Scotland, which he carried out in the same year. In 1753, he was elected Moderator of the General Assembly of the Church of Scotland. In 1771, he was appointed a Dean of the Chapel Royal and Chaplain in Ordinary to George III in Scotland.

In 1775, he is listed as living on Castlehill, at the top of the Royal Mile.

Socially, despite his 'High Flying' Evangelical position in the Kirk, he was a convivial man, known as Bonum Magnum for his capacity for claret. His wife's nephew Boswell often mentions dining with the family.

He died in Edinburgh on 25 January 1784 and is buried beside Mary in Greyfriars Kirkyard, Edinburgh, in a now-unmarked grave.

== Family ==
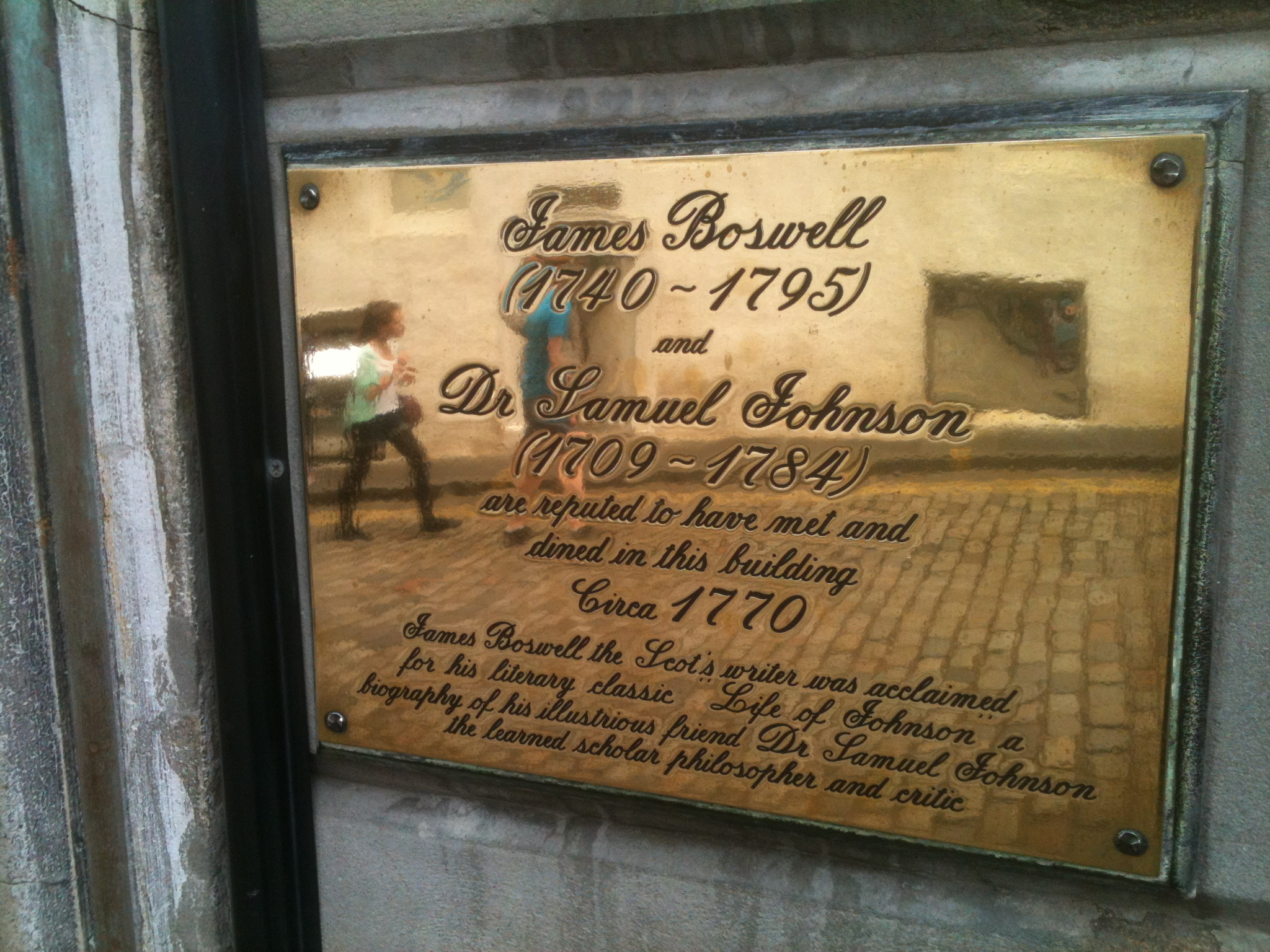
James Boswell and Samuel Johnson plaque, Edinburgh

In June 1737 he was married to Mary Erskine (d.1766), daughter of Col. John Erskine of Alva. They had several children.

- His two eldest sons, John (b. 1738) and James (b. 1740), served in the American Revolutionary War. John was a captain in the 4th Regiment of Foot. James ('Jamie') was especially well regarded as Lieutenant-Colonel of the 33rd Foot, Lord Cornwallis's own regiment, and acting Brigadier. When he died of wounds after the battle of Guilford Courthouse in 1781, Cornwallis wrote a touching letter of condolence to Alexander Webster.
- The third son, George Webster (1744–1794) served as paymaster in the HEICS and died in Bengal.
- William Webster (1750–1767) died in his youth.
- His eldest daughter Ann (1752–1786) married Captain Eyre Robert Mingay of the 66th Regiment of Foot
- Alexander Webster (1754–1782) first mate on the East Indiaman "Dutton" – died at sea
- Basil Webster (1757–1759) died in infancy

Mary's sister Euphemia Erskine, was the mother of James Boswell and Boswell visited the family on Castlehill with his friend Dr Johnson. A plaque on the building makes reference to Boswell but not to Webster.

Webster wrote of his wife Mary:

When I see thee, I love thee, but hearing adore,
I wonder, and think you a woman no more;
Till, mad with admiring, I cannot contain,
And, kissing those lips, find you woman again.

== Sources ==
- Robert Chambers, Traditions of Edinburgh, 1824.
