= Cities of Scotland =

Scotland's cities

A map of the eight cities of Scotland.

Scotland has eight cities. Edinburgh is the capital city and Glasgow is the most populous. Scottish towns were granted burghs or royal burgh status by Scottish kings, including by David I of Scotland and William the Lion.

City status has later been granted by royal charter and letters patent. Scotland has gained new cities since the year 2000 via submitted bids to be awarded city status as part of jubilees of the reigning British monarch or for other events, such as the millennium celebrations. Dunfermline is the latest to be awarded city status.

== Capital ==
=== Forteviot ===
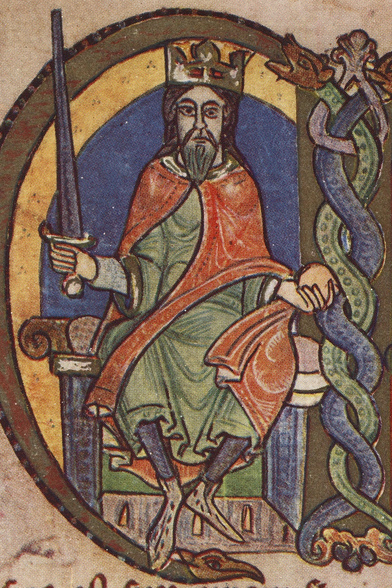
Dauíd mac Maíl Choluim, King of Scots

The annals of Ulster cite Forteviot as the residence of Pictish kings Causantín mac Fergusa and Kenneth MacAlpin and that upon the destruction of Forteviot by the Danes, the Picts took residence across the river Tay, establishing Scone as a more defensible royal city.

=== Scone ===
Causantín mac Áeda, King of Scots held the first recorded council at Scone in 906. Malcolm IV of Scotland in a charter to the monastery of Scone states it was founded "in principali sede regni nostri". Alexander III of Scotland became the first King of Scots to be crowned rather than enthroned in 1249 at Scone. Scone was described by John of Fordun on the crowning of as the "sedes superior", the principal seat of Scotland. Perth was made a royal burgh by David I of Scotland in ~1124. Scone is likely to have remained the Scottish capital until the reign of Malcolm III of Scotland.

=== Edinburgh ===
Scone remained the capital until 1437 until this status shifted to Edinburgh. The name Edinburgh comes from the old Celtic for area, Eidyn and burgh, which means fortress. Edinburgh has been inhabited since at least 8500BC, when it was inhabited by Welsh-speaking Celtic Britons, and came under Scottish rule around 960CE after Indulf King of Scots seized it. When James I of Scotland was killed in 1437, James II of Scotland moved the royal court from Perth to Edinburgh. James III of Scotland (1451–88) later referred to it as "the principal burgh of our kingdom". In 1633 Charles I referred to Edinburgh in a charter as the "principal burgh of our kingdom of Scotland" and "the chief city".

== City status ==
Glasgow was recognised in 1175 via the granting of a burgh in a charter by William the Lion. In 1476, Charter of James III of Scotland confirmed "the City and Barony in free regality". Edinburgh was recognised as a royal burgh from ~1124, introduced by David I of Scotland as part of his feudalisation after ascending to the throne in 1124. In 1329, Robert the Bruce granted Edinburgh a town charter. It was then made a city in 1633 by Charles I.

Dundee was created a royal burgh in ~1191 by William the Lion. Dundee was then granted city status via letters patent by Queen Victoria in 1889. The Charter recited previous charters granted to Dundee including the Confirmation by Robert the Bruce in 1327, which recited those of William the Lion circa 1191. Aberdeen was granted royal burgh status by King David of Scotland (1124 - 1153). It was also most likely granted royal burgh status by King William the Lion in 1179. In 1891 Aberdeen was given city status by letters patent.

Inverness was made a royal burgh by King David I. In 2000, Inverness was awarded city status. Stirling became a royal burgh in ~1124. In 2002 it became a city. Perth was made a royal burgh by David I of Scotland in ~1124. James VI's Golden Charter to Perth in 1600 referred to it as a "free city and regal and royal burgh". It was officially the second city of Scotland until 1975 when city status was removed when local government was reorganised. It regained the status in 2012.

Dunfermline was also made a royal burgh in ~1124 by David I of Scotland. In 2022, it became the newest Scottish city.

== Recent bids for city status ==
In 1999, Ayr, Inverness, Paisley and Stirling applied for city status and Inverness was successful in 2000. In 2001, Ayr, Dumfries, Paisley and Stirling applied for city status. Stirling was successful in 2002. In 2012, Perth was the only Scottish bid for city status and was successful. Dumfries, Dunfermline, Elgin, Greenock, Livingston, Oban, St Andrews and South Ayrshire submitted bids for city status in 2021. Dunfermline was successful in its city bid for 2022.

== List of Scottish cities ==
Name in English	Name in Scottish Gaelic	Nickname	Council area	Year granted or confirmed	Recognition of Church by King or bishopric established
Edinburgh	Dùn Èideann	Auld Reekie	City of Edinburgh	~1124 as a royal burgh; 1633 as a city	St Giles' Cathedral: St Giles founded in 1124 by David I of Scotland (or Alexander I); St Cuthbert's Church Granted by David I to Holyrood in 1128.
Perth	Peairt	The Fair City	Perth and Kinross	1124 as a royal burgh; 1210 as a royal burgh; 1600 as a city; (Ended city status in 1975); 2012 as a city	St John's Kirk: Grant from King David in 1126
Aberdeen	Obar Dheathain	The Granite City	Aberdeen City	As a royal burgh in ~1124; As a royal burgh in 1179; 1891 as a city	St Machar's Cathedral: Mortlach Church expanded by Malcolm II of Scotland in 1010.; Tradition that Bishopric was translated to Aberdeen in 1125 with evidence for 1150.
Inverness	Inbhir Nis	The Capital of the Highlands	Highland	As a royal burgh 1124-53; 2000 as a city	Old High Church St Stephen's: Founded in the 12th century; First references in a charter by Alexander II in 1240
Stirling	Sruighlea	Gateway to the Highlands	Stirling	1124 as a royal burgh; 2002 as a city	Dunblane Cathedral: Catholic Bishopric founded by the Earl of Strathearn ~1150 but Celtic\Culdees bishops prior.
Dunfermline	Dùn Phàrlain	Auld Grey Toun	Fife	~1124 as a royal burgh; 2022 as a city	Dunfermline Abbey: In 1070, Margaret, Queen of Scots founded a priory where she married Malcolm III.; David I made the priory an abbey in 1128 and built a new church.
Glasgow	Glaschu	Dear Green Place	Glasgow City	1172 or 1175 as a burgh; 1476 as a city	Glasgow Cathedral: First stone building was consecrated in ~1136 in the presence of King David I and his Court when John (1117-1147) was Bishop.
Dundee	Dùn Dè	City of Discovery	Dundee City	~1191 as a royal burgh; 1889 as a city	Dundee Parish Church (St Mary's): Built ~1190 by David, Earl of Huntingdon

== Population and population density ==
City	Population (locality)(2020)	Population (settlement)(2020)	Locality area km^{2}	Settlement area km^{2}	Density (locality) per km^{2}	Density (settlement) per km^{2}
Glasgow	632,350	1,028,220	147	274	4300	3750
Edinburgh	506,520	530,990	119	126	4260	4210
Aberdeen	198,590	220,690	60.7	75.6	3270	2920
Dundee	148,210	158,820	46.5	50.2	3190	3160
Dunfermline	54,990	76,210	19.9	28.8	2760	2650
Inverness	47,790	63,730	24.3	31.3	1970	2040
Perth	47,350	47,350	17.5	17.5	2710	2710
Stirling	37,910	49,950	16.3	20.9	2330	2390

== See also ==
- List of burghs in Scotland
- Royal burgh
- Burgh
- List of built-up areas in Scotland by population
- List of cathedrals in Scotland
- List of oldest buildings in Scotland
