= Mike Soutar =

Scottish entrepreneur (born 1966)

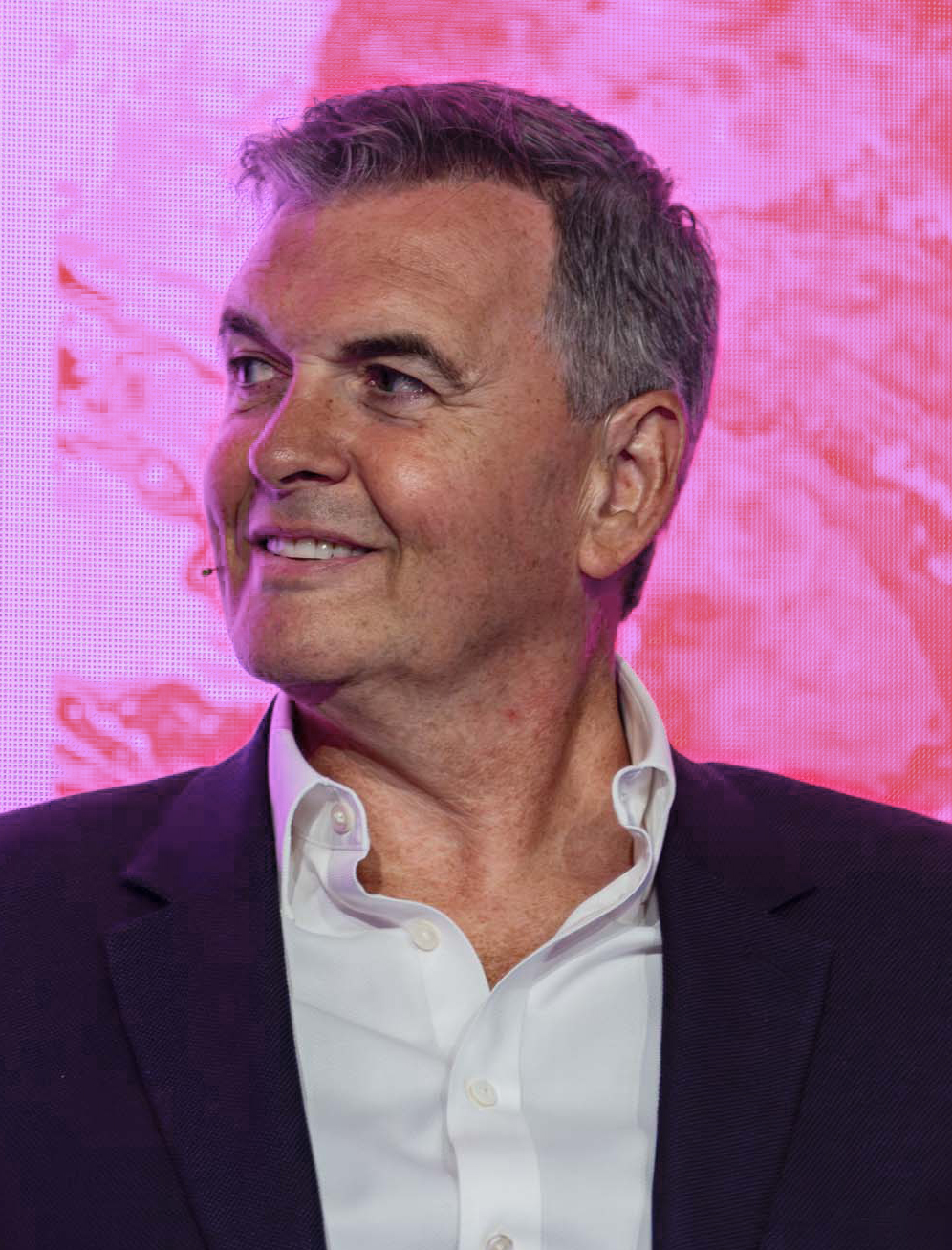
- Soutar at SXSW London in June 2025
- Born: Dundee, Scotland
- Occupation: Entrepreneur
- Years active: 1984–present
- Television: The Apprentice
- Spouse: Bev Hillier (1990s–present)
- Children: 2

Mike Soutar is a Scottish entrepreneur. Born in Dundee, he edited issues of Jackie, Smash Hits, FHM, and Maxim before joining IPC Magazines and launching the magazines Nuts, Pick Me Up, TV easy, and Look. A bout of typhoid led him to set up his own businesses including Shortlist Media Limited, through which he has appeared on the British version of The Apprentice since its 2011 series. He has also spent time in charge of Emap Radio and The Evening Standard and has sat on the boards of Scottish Rugby Union, the Independent Press Standards Organisation, the UK government's Board of Trade, and V&A Dundee.

== Life and career ==
Soutar was born in Dundee to an industrial chemist and a teacher who sent him to South Parks Primary School and Glenrothes High School in Fife, the latter between 1978 and 1984. He initially wanted to be a PE teacher, but lost interest after a course put him off. He launched his journalism career aged 17 after being hired to write beauty tips for Secrets, a romantic fiction magazine owned by DC Thomson, before becoming the editor for Jackie and appearing in some of its comic strips. Aged 21, he met his wife Bev Hillier, who spent time as the editor for Just Seventeen; the pair had two sons. He then moved to London in 1987 to work for Virgin Records before becoming editor of Smash Hits aged 23.

From 1994, he spent three years as the editor of FHM before becoming the managing director of Kiss and spending a brief period in charge of Emap Radio. He then joined an unsuccessful Chris Evans-led consortium in March 1999 that would have bought the Daily Star and made him editor, though a deal collapsed last minute.

In April 1999, he moved to America to become Maxim's editor-in-chief. He lasted about a year in this post before returning to Britain to join IPC Magazines, where he spent two and a half years in charge of IPC Ignite before being made editorial director for the group. At the latter, he launched the magazines Nuts, Pick Me Up, TV easy, and Look. In early 2006, Soutar spent several months in hospital after salmonella from a chicken caesar wrap gave him typhoid. While recovering, he decided he wanted to work for himself, and left IPC shortly afterwards, spending six months on gardening leave due to the terms of his contract.

Soutar set up Crash Test Media in late 2006, a consultancy firm for launching media titles, before launching Shortlist Media Limited and the magazine ShortList in 2007 and the magazine Stylist in October 2009. Designers for Shortlist Media helped create magazines at the instruction of candidates on the 2011 series of The Apprentice, shortly after which presenter Alan Sugar approached Soutar offering a job interviewing candidates for the series. Soutar became known for his forensic investigations of candidates' business plans and CVs on the programme; by April 2024, he had bought several URLs that candidates had claimed to own, debunked several candidates' false claims, ordered from several candidates' existing services, and produced batches of drinks using candidates' proposed recipes. Clips from his interrogations subsequently became popular on TikTok. Soutar also covered for Tim Campbell as an adviser for one episode in the 2022 series and for two Christmas episodes in 2025.

Soutar sold halves of Shortlist in 2013 and 2015 to DC Thomson, who had previously backed the firm. In 2016, he went part-time there and joined the board of the Independent Press Standards Organisation. Soutar left the former in late 2018, around the time its print version was discontinued, and left the latter in October 2019 to become The Evening Standard's first chief executive officer, which he left in late May after the COVID-19 pandemic in the United Kingdom made him decide he wanted a portfolio career. In April 2025, he held board positions at Scottish Rugby Union, V&A Dundee, and the UK government's Board of Trade and was living in Epping Forest with Hillier. He then released the book Next Gen CEO in June 2026 and presented the podcast History's Greatest Leaders the month after; the former was inspired by AI, wars, culture wars, and differing opinions of work, work ethic, and remuneration among young people.
