= Colin Tough =

British journalist

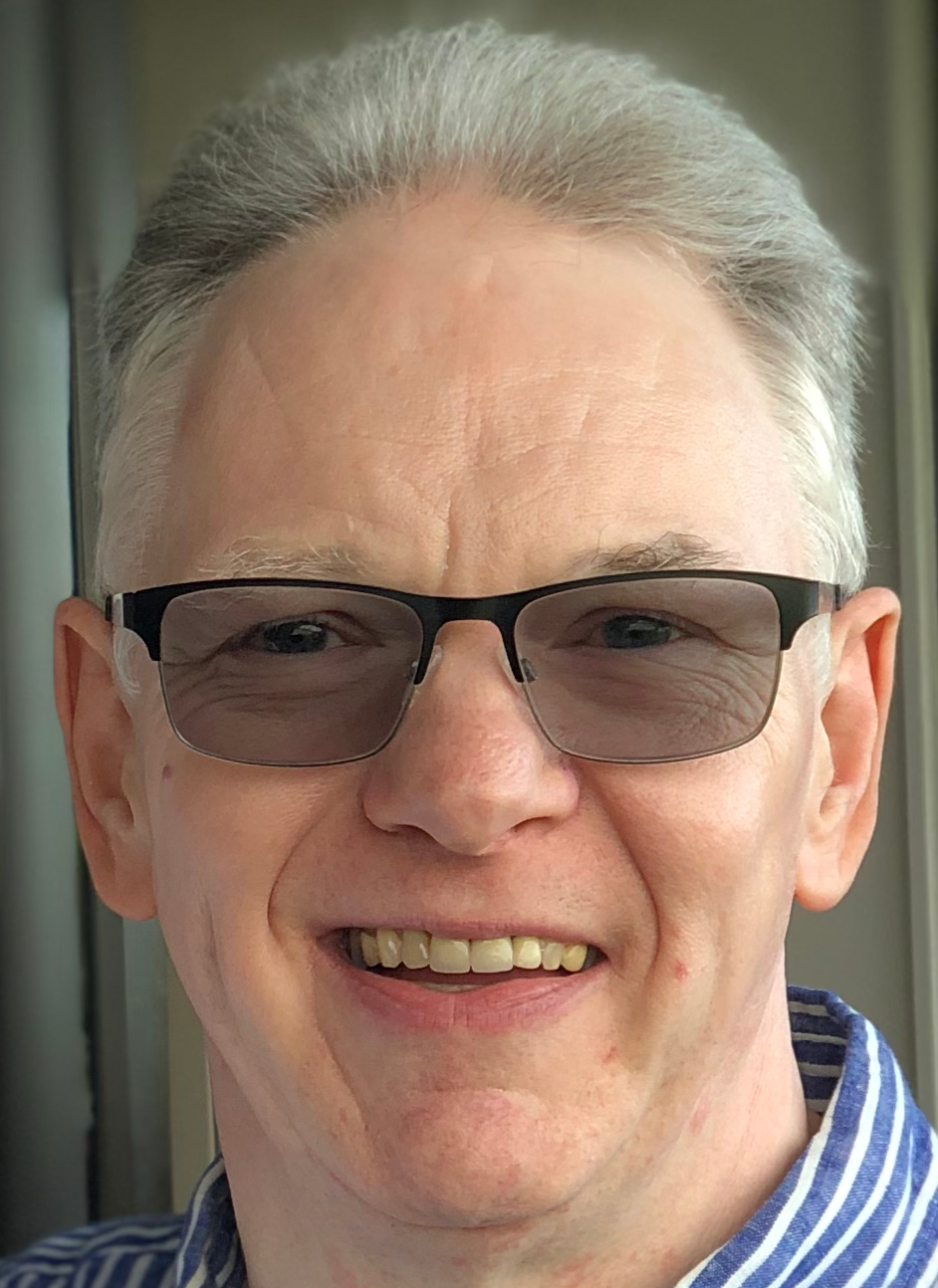
Colin Tough

Colin Tough (born October 1959 in Clydebank, Dunbartonshire) is a British journalist and author, former Editor in Chief of What's On TV, TVTimes and TV & Satellite Week, and former Managing Director of Future PLC's TV & Entertainment group.

== Early life ==
Tough attended Clydebank High School, where he was head boy in his final year.

== Career ==
Tough started his career in Scottish newspapers and at 19 edited his first title, The Govan Press, where he commissioned Captain Clyde, one of the first comic strips by now-renowned comic book writer Grant Morrison. He moved to London and the magazine industry in 1983. In the early 1990s, he edited the short-lived UK edition of TV Guide, joined TVTimes as deputy editor and was launch editor of TV & Satellite Week.

Tough launched IPC Media's digital initiative in 1994 and, as new media editor-in-chief and publishing director, was involved in all of IPC’s early digital projects, including the Milia d’Or award-winning CD-Rom magazine, UnZip, and the UK's first digital EPG.

In 2002 he edited IPC’s market-leading Web User, before taking over as editor of Britain’s best-selling magazine, What's On TV. Three years later he launched the UK’s first compact TV magazine, TV easy. In 2016 he was appointed editor-in-chief of all Time Inc TV titles.

Colin became managing director of Future PLC's TV & Entertainment group in July 2020. He retired in 2021.

Shortlisted 15 times for the British Society of Magazine Editors (BSME) awards, Tough won the BSME Entertainment & Celebrity Editor of the Year award in 2018. He also won the IPC Media Editor of the Year award in 2001, 2007 and 2012.

Since retiring, he has written four books – his autobiography, Guess Who I Met!, and three London walking guides.

In addition to his journalistic work, Tough also devised Sounds Like Music, an afternoon game show which ran for two 26-show series on ITV.

== Personal life ==
Tough is married with a son. His brother is Ian Tough of the comedy act The Krankies.
