= Stewart Hillis =

Scottish physician (1943–2014)

- Born: William Stewart Hillis; 27 September 1943; Clydebank, Scotland
- Died: 20 July 2014 (aged 70); Glasgow, Scotland
- Education: University of Glasgow
- Occupations: professor of cardiology and exercise medicine
- Known for: doctor for Scotland national football team
- Medical career
- Institutions: Western Infirmary; University of Glasgow; Scottish Football Association

William Stewart Hillis OBE (28 September 1943 − 21 July 2014) was a Scottish physician who held a professorship in cardiology and exercise medicine. He was doctor for the Scotland national football team for 228 full international matches, part of his involvement with football that spanned more than 40 year during his medical career. He was vice-chairman of the UEFA medical committee and medical advisor to FIFA.

== Early life ==
William Stewart Hillis was born on 28 September 1943 in Clydebank, but was always known as Stewart. He was the son of a foreman at John Brown's shipyard. He was educated at Linnvale Primary and then Clydebank High School. He studied medicine at the University of Glasgow, graduating in 1967. He married Anne and they had three sons and a daughter.

== Academic medicine ==
Hillis spent a year working at Vanderbilt University in Nashville, Tennessee. In 1977, he was appointed as a consultant cardiologist at Stobhill Hospital in Glasgow, then working at the Western Infirmary in Glasgow.

Hillis started Bachelor of Science and Masters courses in Sports Medicine at the University of Glasgow in 1995 and was course director until 2012. In 1997, the University of Glasgow awarded Hillis a personal chair in cardiology and exercise medicine.

== Sports medicine ==
=== Club football ===
In 1970, Hillis became the team doctor for Clydebank and remained in this position for 27 years.

He had a brief spell as club doctor at Rangers F.C. but during this period the club signed Daniel Prodan in 1998 without some significant medical problems being discovered before the completion of the deal. When the club's owner David Murray rushed the deal for the player through, Hillis hadn't been allowed the normal amount of time to complete his medical checks.

=== International football ===
In 1976, he began working with the Scottish Football Association to provide medical support for the Scotland national under-21 football team and he covered 54 matches. In 1982, he was promoted to cover the Scotland national team doctor. In 1985, at the Wales vs Scotland football match in Cardiff, the Scotland team manager Jock Stein collapsed and although Hillis and the team attempted resuscitation, Stein died from a heart attack.

Hillis was the chief doctor for Scotland at the 1986 FIFA World Cup in Mexico. In 1987 the SFA approved the formation of medical subcommittee and Hillis was part of it. He was part of the 9-man backroom team for the 1990 FIFA World Cup in Italy.

Hillis helped establish the Sports Medicine Centre inside Hampden Park, the first of its kind in a national stadium. He stepped down as the Scotland team doctor in 2010, but remained involved research and he continued to be involved with the SFA. He became the medical director of the SFA.

In 1986, he became a member of UEFA's Medical Committee and he had several stints as vice-chairman of the committee. He was a medical adviser to FIFA.

=== Commonwealth Games ===
Hillis had been working with the medical team to prepare for the 2014 Commonwealth Games. He was diagnosed with mesothelioma in May 2014, however he continued to work until the middle of June.

== Awards and honours ==
In 2008, Hillis was awarded the Sir Robert Atkin prize by the Institute of Sport and Exercise Medicine. He was awarded an OBE in the 2010 New Year Honours list for services to medicine and sport.

In 2014, the British Association of Sport and Exercise Medicine (BASEM) awarded him the Roger Bannister medal, recognising an outstanding contribution to the field of Sport and Exercise Medicine over his lifetime. In July 2015 a project to look at how best to treat mental health issues encountered by footballers in Scotland was funded by the UEFA Research Grant Programme and was dedicated to Hillis.

In October 2015, he was posthumously admitted into the Scottish Football Hall of Fame. In 2016 he was made an honorary fellow of the Faculty of Sport and Exercise Medicine UK.
