= St Andrew's High School, Clydebank =

Coordinates: 55.898°N 4.398°W

St Andrew's High School
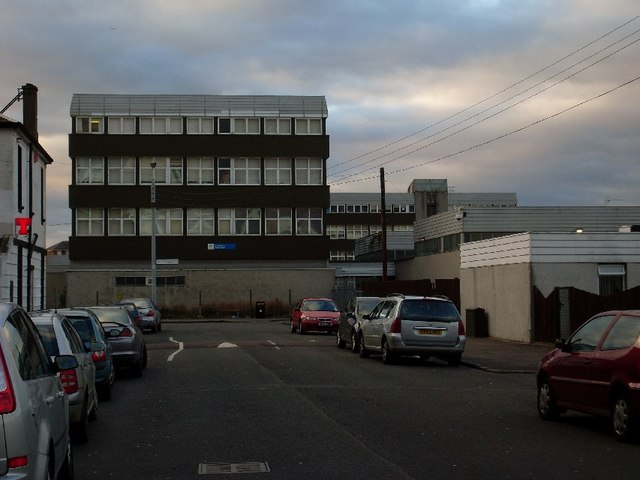

Location
- North Douglas Street; Whitecrook, Clydebank, G81 1NQ; Scotland

Information
- Type: Comprehensive School
- Motto: Commitment to Excellence
- Religious affiliation: Roman Catholic
- Established: 1970
- Closed: 28 June 2009
- Authority: West Dunbartonshire
- Head teacher: Mick Vassie
- Chaplain: Father Tartaglia
- Teaching staff: 70-80
- Gender: Co-educational
- Age: 11 to 18
- Enrollment: 1,000 +
- Colour: Blue
- Accreditation: Investors in People, Schools of Ambition

St Andrew's High School was a Catholic high school situated in Whitecrook in Clydebank in Scotland. It was closed in 2009 and amalgamated with St Columba's High School to form St Peter the Apostle High School on the site of St Columba's in Drumry. The final head teacher was Mick Vassie (in post from 1995) who then took over as head of the new school; he retired in 2013.

By June 2010 the building had been deemed to be in a dangerous condition following two arson attacks, hastening its demolition. As with the other vacant site in the town where a school had been (at Braidfield High School), the St Andrew's site lay unused for some years until 2016, when the local authority approved plans for it to be used for a housing development; construction actually commenced in 2019.
