= Emily Swankie =

- Born: 17 December 1915; Clydebank, Scotland
- Died: 24 February 2008; Rothesay, Isle of Bute, Scotland
- Known for: Communist activist and campaigner

Emily Elizabeth Swankie (17 December 1915 - 24 February 2008) was a British activist and campaigner who participated in the National Hunger March from Glasgow to London to protest against poverty and unemployment in the United Kingdom.

== Background ==
Emily Swankie (née Mairs) was born in Clydebank, Scotland on 17 December 1915, the daughter of John Mairs, a shoemaker, and Helen McBrearty. She was one of twelve children, living in Glasgow tenement flat in 1934.

== Campaigning for poverty and unemployment ==
Swankie showed political interests since she was young and was politically active ever since. When she was 17, she joined a socialist youth organisation, ILP Guild of Youth, and established a branch in her hometown, Clydebank, a year later.

She joined the Communist Party and participated in the hunger marches from Glasgow to London in 1934 to protest against poverty and unemployment. The protests were organised by National Unemployed Worker's Movement (NUWM), who also delegated Swankie to be the leader of the Youth contingent. Mentioning her reason of her participation in the marches:

"... it was for no political reason other than my strong resentment against the way that we had to live and the lack of opportunity, the lack of jobs."

At that time, the women marchers had to sleep in the local workhouse due to lack of local people offering accommodations. They were also prohibited of alcohol, had to march separately and had to wear black stockings to avoid offending the public when marching in their bare legs. Her experience of the hunger march was published in Voices from the Hunger Marches.

In 1941, her older brother, Charlie, was unemployed, which reduced the financial stability of the family. Due to the Means Test, any unemployed person is ineligible for any welfare payments if they live in any households with at least one employed member. Therefore, Charlie pretended to live somewhere else to qualify. He would have to hide when the Means Test inspectors pay unexpected visits. These intrusions of their privacy further increased the resentment of the poverty and lack of employment in the country.

She was in the Scottish Committee of the Communist party between 1946 and 1949.

She stood for local council elections in Clydebank from 1950s to 1970s. She also actively campaigned for housing issues and participated in the rent strike against the Housing Finance Act of 1972.
