= Morison Memorial church =

Church in Clydebank, Scotland

Coordinates: 55.901°N 4.409°W

Morison Memorial church in 2017

Morison Memorial United Reformed Church is a church in Clydebank, Scotland. It is situated on Dumbarton Road near Clydebank Town Hall. Initial plans were drawn up in 1893. The church was designed by Glasgow architects, Steel & Balfour, in the English Gothic style and the foundation stone was laid by John Wilson, MP for Govan, on 3 October 1896. Morison has survived over 100 years including the Clydebank Blitz during World War II.

The church was founded as an Evangelical Union church but soon became part of the Congregational Union of Scotland.

In April 2000 the Congregational Union of Scotland united with the United Reformed Church creating a church in three nations.

== Awards ==
The Church has won several awards during its time. Most recently it was the recipient of the 2006 Congregational Insurance & Reform Magazine Community Award, for the work of its Community Cafe.

It has also been awarded a Child Friendly Church Award and was the first church in the denomination to win one in Scotland. This is mark of excellence in the provision and delivery of church to children and young people.
