= John McGinn =

Scottish footballer (born 1994)

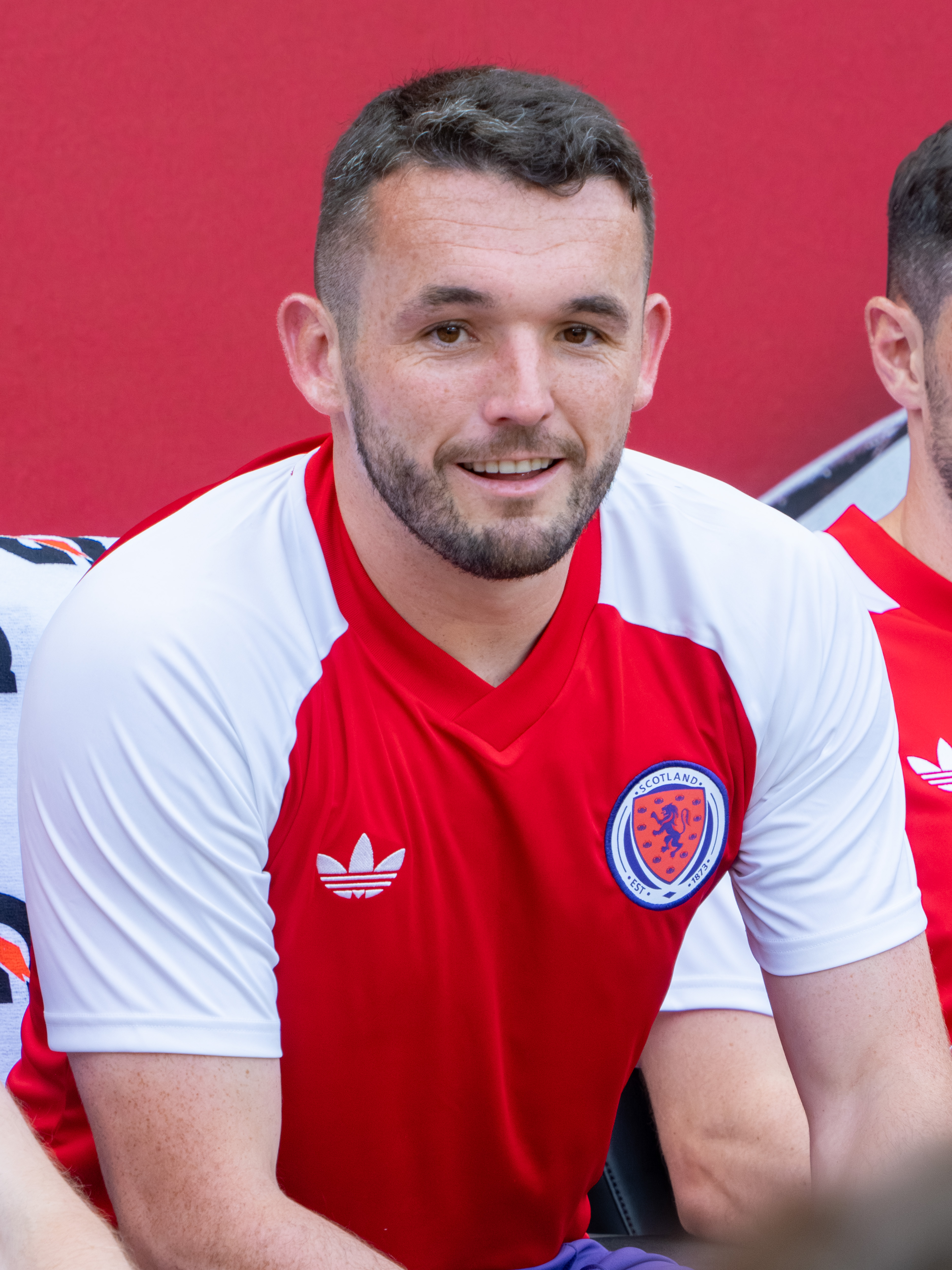
- McGinn in 2026

Personal information
- Full name: John McGinn
- Date of birth: 18 October 1994 (age 32)
- Place of birth: Glasgow, Scotland
- Height: 5 ft 10 in (1.78 m)
- Position: Midfielder

Team information
- Current team: Aston Villa
- Number: 7

Youth career
- St Mirren

Senior career*
Years	Team	Apps	(Gls)
2012–2015	St Mirren	87	(4)
2015–2018	Hibernian	101	(12)
2018–	Aston Villa	284	(30)

International career^{‡}
2013–2014	Scotland U19	4	(0)
2014–2016	Scotland U21	9	(0)
2016–	Scotland	95	(24)
- * Club domestic league appearances and goals as of 21:11, 21 November 2026 (UTC) ‡ National team caps and goals as of 22:45, 16 November 2026 (UTC)

John McGinn (born 18 October 1994) is a Scottish footballer who plays as a midfielder for Premier League club Aston Villa, which he captains, and the Scotland national team. Predominantly a centre midfielder but capable of playing in any midfield position, McGinn is known for his running style and ball shielding ability.

Having grown up in a footballing family, McGinn started his career with St Mirren. He won the Scottish League Cup in 2013 with them, during his first season as a first team player. McGinn moved to Hibernian in 2015, and with them he won the Scottish Cup in 2016 and promotion in 2017.

McGinn moved to English football in August 2018, signing for Aston Villa. He scored the winning goal as Villa won the play-off final and promotion to the Premier League in his first season with the club, and he went on to score the first goal in their first season back in the top flight since 2016. McGinn was appointed team captain in July 2022, captaining his team to a UEFA Europa League victory in 2025–26.

McGinn represented Scotland at the under-19 and under-21 levels before making his full international debut in March 2016; he has since represented them at UEFA Euro 2020, Euro 2024 and the 2026 FIFA World Cup. McGinn is currently both the country's third-highest capped player and third-highest goalscorer.

== Club career ==
=== St Mirren ===
McGinn started his career as a youth player at St Mirren, playing for the club's Ralston Academy. He broke into the first team in pre-season of the 2012–13 season, representing the club against English opposition Carlisle United and Accrington Stanley. In the same summer he also helped the under-20 side to victory in Kilbirnie Ladeside pre-season tournament, picking up joint player of the tournament with Jack Smith. McGinn made his competitive début against SPL champions Celtic in a 5–0 defeat, coming off the bench as a 78th-minute substitute.

On 29 November 2012, McGinn signed a new three-year contract, keeping him at St Mirren Park until summer 2015. McGinn played the first 81 minutes of the 2013 Scottish League Cup final, as St Mirren won the League Cup by winning 3–2 against Hearts.

In April 2015, McGinn was "speared" in the thigh with a training pole thrown by St Mirren club captain Steven Thompson during a training session prank gone wrong. The resulting injury meant that McGinn missed the remainder of the season, and in turn he took legal action against the club. St Mirren were relegated from the Scottish Premiership at the end of the 2014–15 season. McGinn later admitted that he had played "poorly" during that season, and that he had been distracted by speculation linking him with transfers to English clubs.

=== Hibernian ===
Having suffered the training ground injury and relegation during the spring of 2015, McGinn's transfer options were reduced. He trained with Houston Dynamo during July 2015, but they were unable to sign him due to foreign player restrictions on Major League Soccer clubs. On 31 July 2015, McGinn signed a four-year contract with Hibernian, who paid St Mirren a development fee for McGinn and promised them 30% of any future transfer fee. McGinn was part of the Hibernian team that won the 2015–16 Scottish Cup, the club's first victory in the competition for 114 years. In the following season, McGinn helped them win promotion to the Scottish Premiership by winning the 2016–17 Scottish Championship.

Hibs rejected three offers from EFL Championship club Nottingham Forest for McGinn during August 2017. McGinn scored both of the Hibs goals in a 2–2 draw at Celtic on 30 September, and the first goal in a 2–1 win at Rangers on 3 February 2018. McGinn was one of four players nominated for the 2017–18 PFA Scotland Players' Player of the Year award.

Celtic made three offers for McGinn during July 2018, but these were all rejected by Hibernian. During this period of transfer speculation, McGinn continued to play regularly for Hibs and scored the winning goal in a Europa League qualifier against Asteras Tripolis. McGinn visited Aston Villa's training ground on 7 August to discuss a potential transfer, which was completed the following day.

=== Aston Villa ===
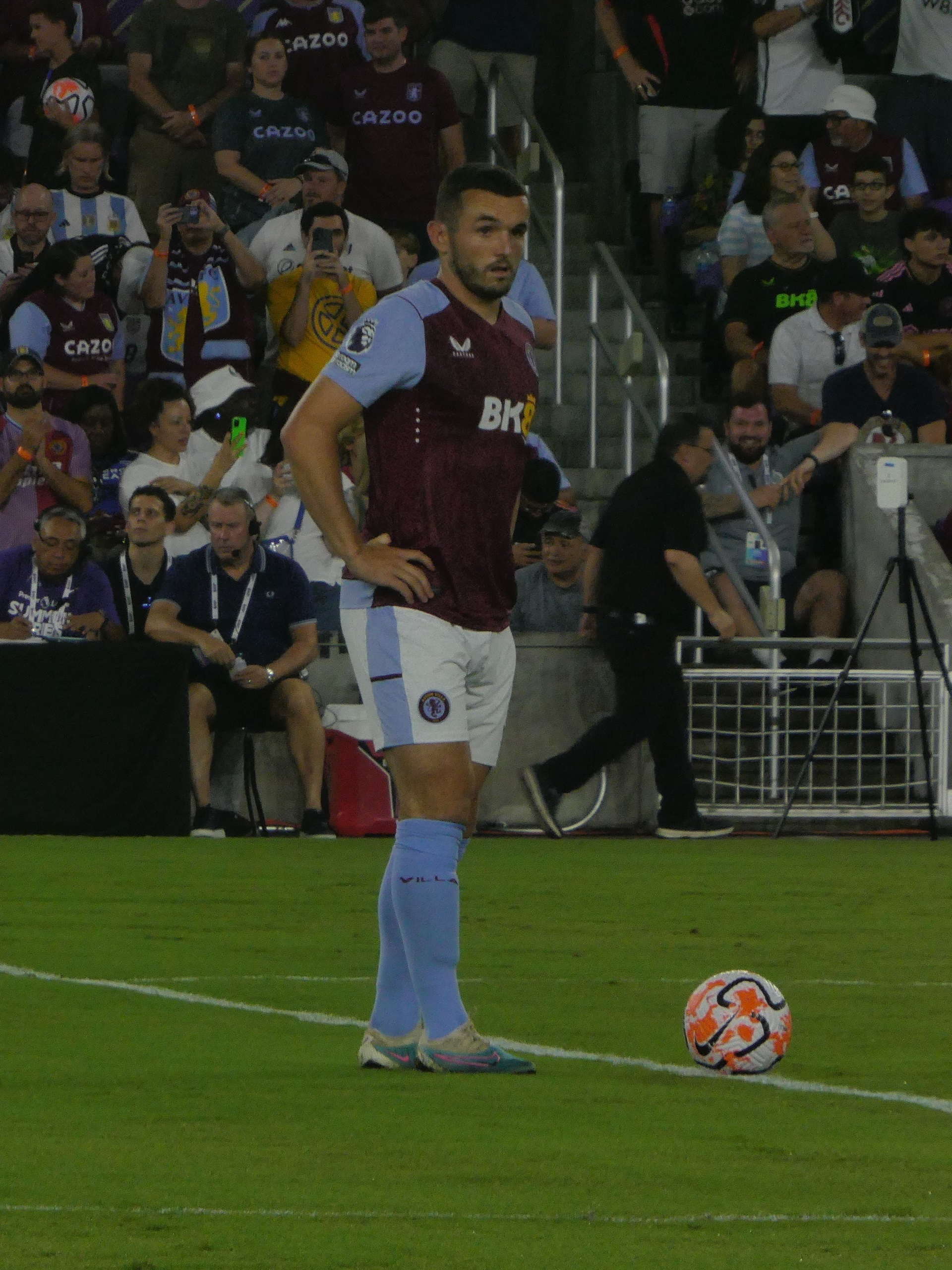
McGinn playing for Aston Villa in 2023.

23-year-old McGinn signed a four-year contract with Steve Bruce's Aston Villa on 8 August 2018 despite interest from Celtic. He made his debut for Villa in a 3–2 win against Wigan Athletic on 11 August, during which he provided an assist for the opening goal and his inswinging corner forced an own goal in the second half. McGinn scored his first goal in English football on 22 September, a swerving 25-yard volley in a 2–1 home defeat against Sheffield Wednesday which was later named EFL Championship goal of the season.

Despite consistent performances at his new club, which saw McGinn quickly become a new fan favourite, Aston Villa began the season poorly, which resulted in the dismissal of Steve Bruce as manager of the club in October 2018. Dean Smith was appointed as Villa's new manager, and McGinn continued to be a key player for the team. He scored his first goal under the new manager in a 3–0 win against Derby County, and then picked up his first brace for the club in a 3–1 win over Nottingham Forest in March 2019. McGinn's good form continued, scoring goals against Middlesbrough and Sheffield Wednesday as Villa's form picked up heading into the final stages of the season. After picking up the club's Players' Player of the Season and Supporters' Player of the Season awards, McGinn scored the winner in the Championship play-off final in a 2–1 victory over Derby County, to promote Aston Villa to the Premier League after three years in the Championship.

On 8 August 2019, McGinn signed a five-year contract with the club. He scored the first goal of Aston Villa's return to the Premier League in the first game of the season, a 3–1 away defeat to Tottenham Hotspur on 10 August 2019. On 21 December 2019, McGinn suffered a fractured ankle in a 3–1 home defeat to Southampton and was expected to be out for up to three months. The break in the season caused by the COVID-19 pandemic meant that McGinn returned later in the same season, and he featured in all of Villa's remaining games as they retained Premier League status.

On 11 December 2020, McGinn signed a new five-year contract, which sees him extend his stay at Villa Park until 2025. Following the departure of club captain Jack Grealish, McGinn was announced as the new vice-captain on 14 August 2021. He scored in Villa's league opener, a 3–2 defeat against Watford.

On 27 July 2022, ahead of the new season, Aston Villa manager Steven Gerrard named McGinn as the new captain, with Emiliano Martínez replacing him as vice-captain.

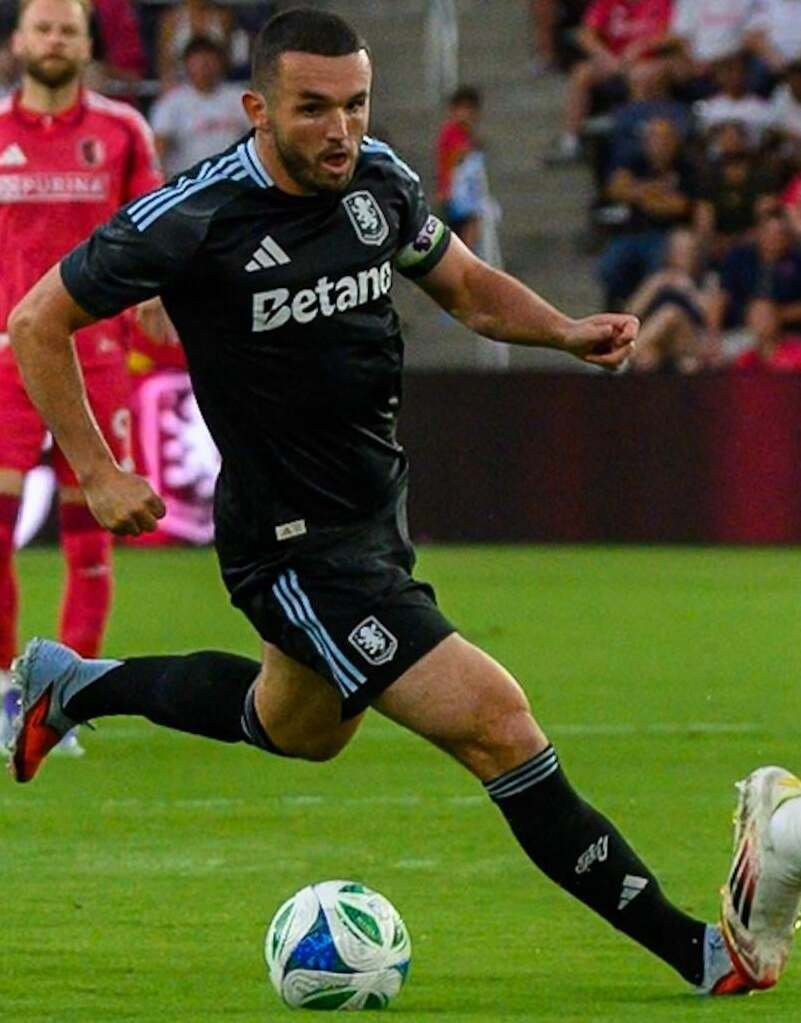
McGinn playing for Aston Villa in 2025.

McGinn signed a new four-year contract with Villa in June 2023. On 5 October 2023, he scored the winning goal from a header in the 94th minute of stoppage time in a 1–0 victory over Zrinjski Mostar during the 2023–24 Conference League group stage, to be his club's first ever win in the competition.

On 10 March 2024, McGinn received his first red card in the Premier League due to a dangerous challenge he made on Destiny Udogie. His dismissal meant that he would miss the three games against West Ham United, Wolverhampton Wanderers and Manchester City. Later that year, on 22 October, he netted his first UEFA Champions League goal in a 2–0 victory over Bologna. He scored his 50th career goal on 10 December 2024 in Villa's 3–2 Champions League win at RB Leipzig.

McGinn's run and long-range finish in a 3–2 victory over Paris Saint-Germain on 15 April 2025, was later voted Aston Villa's Goal of the Season for the 2024–25 season.

On 5 November 2025, McGinn signed a contract extension with Aston Villa, lasting until 2028. The following day, McGinn made his 300th appearance for Villa in a 2–0 victory over Maccabi Tel Aviv in the UEFA Europa League, becoming the 36th player to reach that milestone. On 7 May 2026, he netted a brace in a 4–0 win over Nottingham Forest in the Europa League semi-final second leg, securing his club's place in the final by winning 4–1 on aggregate. In the Europa League final, he captained his side to a 3–0 victory over SC Freiburg, becoming the third player after Dennis Mortimer and Ken McNaught to captain the club to a European trophy.

== International career ==
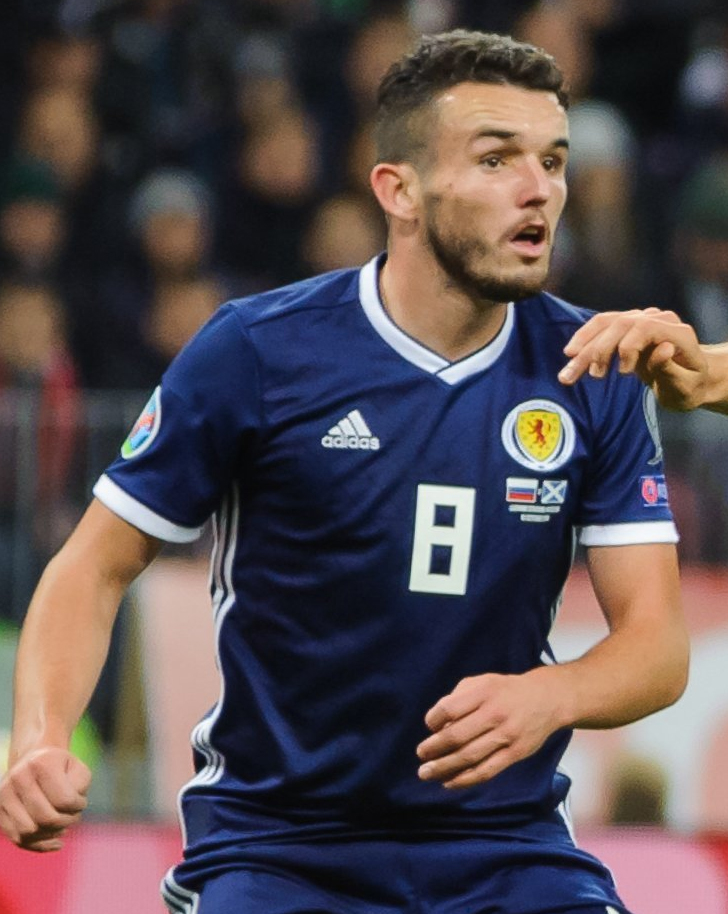
McGinn playing for Scotland in 2019.

McGinn received an international call-up when he was selected as part of a Scotland under-19 squad for a training camp in Turkey in January 2013. He later went on to make his international debut for the under-19 side against Netherlands in a 2–1 defeat. McGinn then captained the under-19s against Serbia in Stara Pazova. On 5 March 2014, he made his debut for the Scotland under-21 side in a 2–2 draw against Hungary at Tannadice. McGinn later captained the under-21 team.

The 21-year-old McGinn received his first call-up to the senior Scotland squad in March 2016, for a friendly against Denmark. McGinn played for the whole of the 1–0 win and was awarded man of the match.

McGinn scored his first goal for Scotland in September 2019, during a Euro 2020 qualification match with Russia. McGinn scored the first hat-trick in his career in a Euro 2020 qualifier against San Marino on 13 October 2019, with all his goals coming in the first half. Two goals against Kazakhstan meant that McGinn finished with a total of 7 goals in the Euro 2020 qualifying group.

With regular captain Andy Robertson suspended, McGinn captained Scotland during a 1–0 win against the Czech Republic on 14 October 2020.

McGinn scored three goals for Scotland in March 2021 during the 2022 FIFA World Cup qualification matches: a bicycle kick in a 2–2 draw against Austria and two in a 4–0 win against the Faroe Islands. In September of that year he played the whole match in Vienna as Scotland defeated Austria 1–0; his brother Paul was introduced as a substitute in the second half, and they became only the third siblings to play together for the national team since the end of World War II.

McGinn won his 50th cap for Scotland on 24 September 2022, in a 2–1 win against Republic of Ireland. During that same international period he again captained the team, as Andy Robertson was absent due to injury. A goalless draw against Ukraine secured first place in the group and promotion to the top level of the Nations League.

McGinn was named in Scotland's squad for the UEFA Euro 2024 finals in Germany. A week later, he started the opening match of the tournament, where Scotland lost 5–1 to hosts Germany. He went on to start against both Switzerland and Hungary as Scotland finished bottom of Group A with one point from three matches.

On 15 November 2024, McGinn came on as a substitute and scored the only goal of the game as Scotland beat Croatia 1–0 at Hampden in the UEFA Nations League. In doing so, he became Scotland's joint fourth all-time top goalscorer alongside Ally McCoist.

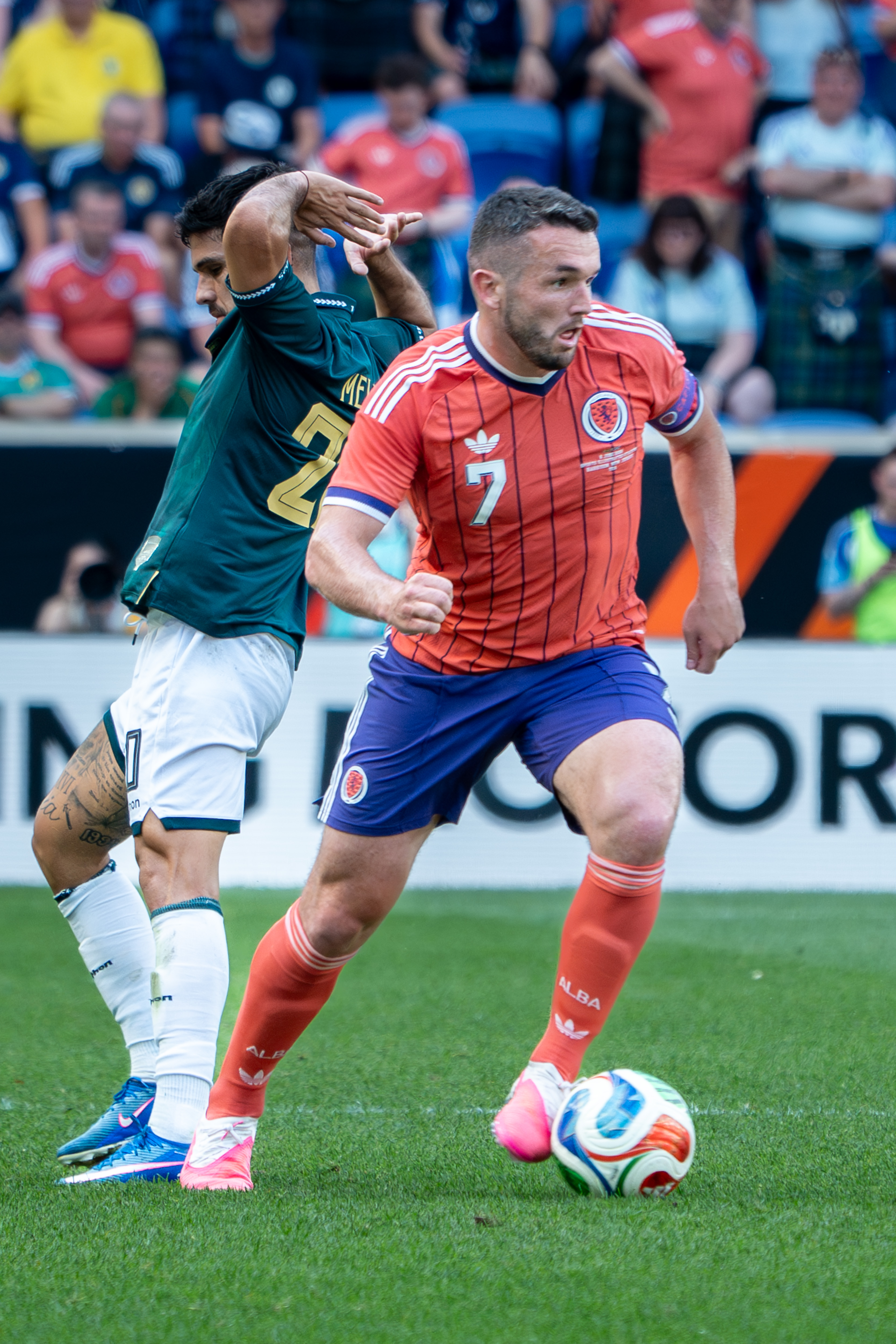
McGinn playing for Scotland in 2026.

On 19 May 2026, McGinn was selected in the 26-man squad for the 2026 FIFA World Cup. He was named player of the match after scoring the lone goal in their first World Cup group match against Haiti on 13 June, marking Scotland's first World Cup win since 1990. His goal was Scotland's only goal of the tournament. In addition, he became the oldest Scottish player to score at a World Cup at 31 years and 238 days.

McGinn became only the fourth Scottish man to reach 90 caps when he started their 0–0 draw with Slovenia on 26 September 2026.

== Playing style ==
Usually a centre midfielder, McGinn is capable of playing in any midfield role, including as a winger or attacking midfielder.

McGinn has a low centre of balance, allowing him to deploy an unusual running style, where his body remains low to the ground; his former Hibs teammate Niklas Gunnarsson has described his running style as "like he's falling down, with his head facing the floor". He has unusually large buttocks which he uses to shield the ball and turn opponents, as well as draw fouls from defenders; in interviews, McGinn has poked fun at his own build, commenting that "no one" has a backside as large as his. This style of movement has led to comparisons between McGinn and fellow Scottish footballer Kenny Dalglish, who deployed a similar style of play during his career. McGinn is also known to frequently shoot from a distance and start attacks from midfield. Writing for ESPN in their 2026 FC 100 list of the best attacking midfielders in world football, Sam Tighe described McGinn as "one of the most highly effective footballers around," opining that "opponents still have no idea how to handle him".

== Personal life ==
Raised in Clydebank where he attended St Columba's High School and St Peter the Apostle High School, John is the third of four children to parents Stephen and Mary. He has a twin sister, Katie, and his older brothers Stephen and Paul are also professional footballers. All three brothers have been with both St Mirren and Hibernian at some stage in their careers. Their grandfather Jack McGinn was Celtic chairman and Scottish Football Association president. McGinn is often known by the nickname "Meatball", a nickname stemming from a haircut he got as a child.

McGinn often uses a 'goggles' goal celebration, a gesture of support for his nephew who is visually impaired and wears special eyewear to play football.

== Career statistics ==
=== Club ===
As of match played 21 November 2026

Appearances and goals by club, season and competition
Club	Season	League			National cup (Note: Includes Scottish Cup and FA Cup)		League cup (Note: Includes Scottish League Cup and EFL Cup)		Europe		Other		Total	
Club	Season	Division	Apps	Goals	Apps	Goals	Apps	Goals	Apps	Goals	Apps	Goals	Apps	Goals
St Mirren	2012–13	Scottish Premier League	22	1	3	0	2	0	—		—		27	1
St Mirren	2013–14	Scottish Premiership	35	3	2	0	1	0	—		—		38	3
St Mirren	2014–15	Scottish Premiership	30	0	2	0	1	0	—		—		33	0
St Mirren	Total		87	4	7	0	4	0	—		—		98	4
Hibernian	2015–16	Scottish Championship	36	3	7	0	5	1	—		4 (Note: Appearances in Scottish Premiership play-offs)	1	52	5
Hibernian	2016–17 (Note: Soccerbase did not record appearances made by McGinn against Brøndby on 14 July and 21 July 2016.)	Scottish Championship	29	4	5	1	1	0	2 (Note: Appearances in UEFA Europa League)	0	0	0	37	5
Hibernian	2017–18	Scottish Premiership	35	5	1	0	7	1	—		—		43	6
Hibernian	2018–19 (Note: Soccerbase did not record appearances made by McGinn against NSI Runavik on 19 July and Asteras Tripolis on 26 July and 2 August 2018.)	Scottish Premiership	1	0	—		—		3	2	—		4	2
Hibernian	Total		101	12	13	1	13	2	5	2	4	1	136	18
Aston Villa	2018–19	Championship	40	6	1	0	—		—		3 (Note: Appearances in Championship play-offs)	1	44	7
Aston Villa	2019–20	Premier League	28	3	0	0	2	0	—		—		30	3
Aston Villa	2020–21	Premier League	37	3	0	0	0	0	—		—		37	3
Aston Villa	2021–22	Premier League	35	3	1	0	0	0	—		—		36	3
Aston Villa	2022–23	Premier League	34	1	0	0	2	0	—		—		36	1
Aston Villa	2023–24	Premier League	35	6	3	0	1	0	14 (Note: Appearances in UEFA Europa Conference League)	3	—		53	9
Aston Villa	2024–25	Premier League	34	1	4	0	1	0	10 (Note: Appearances in UEFA Champions League)	3	—		49	4
Aston Villa	2025–26	Premier League	30	5	1	0	1	0	12	5	—		44	10
Aston Villa	2026–27	Premier League	11	2	0	0	2	0	4	1	1 (Note: Appearance in UEFA Super Cup)	0	18	3
Aston Villa	Total		284	30	10	0	9	0	40	12	4	1	347	43
Career total			472	46	30	1	26	2	45	14	8	1	581	65

=== International ===
As of match played 16 November 2026

Appearances and goals by national team and year
National team	Year	Apps	Goals
Scotland	2016	2	0
Scotland	2017	3	0
Scotland	2018	8	0
Scotland	2019	8	7
Scotland	2020	8	0
Scotland	2021	13	4
Scotland	2022	10	4
Scotland	2023	10	3
Scotland	2024	11	2
Scotland	2025	10	0
Scotland	2026	12	4
Total		95	24

Scores and results list Scotland's goal tally first, score column indicates score after each McGinn goal.

List of international goals scored by John McGinn
No.	Date	Venue	Cap	Opponent	Score	Result	Competition
1	6 September 2019	Hampden Park, Glasgow, Scotland	16	Russia	1–0	1–2	UEFA Euro 2020 qualifying
2	13 October 2019	Hampden Park, Glasgow, Scotland	19	San Marino	1–0	6–0	UEFA Euro 2020 qualifying
3	13 October 2019	Hampden Park, Glasgow, Scotland	19	San Marino	2–0	6–0	UEFA Euro 2020 qualifying
4	13 October 2019	Hampden Park, Glasgow, Scotland	19	San Marino	3–0	6–0	UEFA Euro 2020 qualifying
5	16 November 2019	GSP Stadium, Nicosia, Cyprus	20	Cyprus	2–1	2–1	UEFA Euro 2020 qualifying
6	19 November 2019	Hampden Park, Glasgow, Scotland	21	Kazakhstan	1–1	3–1	UEFA Euro 2020 qualifying
7	19 November 2019	Hampden Park, Glasgow, Scotland	21	Kazakhstan	3–1	3–1	UEFA Euro 2020 qualifying
8	25 March 2021	Hampden Park, Glasgow, Scotland	30	Austria	2–2	2–2	2022 FIFA World Cup qualification
9	31 March 2021	Hampden Park, Glasgow, Scotland	32	Faroe Islands	1–0	4–0	2022 FIFA World Cup qualification
10	31 March 2021	Hampden Park, Glasgow, Scotland	32	Faroe Islands	2–0	4–0	2022 FIFA World Cup qualification
11	9 October 2021	Hampden Park, Glasgow, Scotland	39	Israel	1–1	3–2	2022 FIFA World Cup qualification
12	29 March 2022	Ernst-Happel-Stadion, Vienna, Austria	44	Austria	2–0	2–2	Friendly
13	14 June 2022	Vazgen Sargsyan Republican Stadium, Yerevan, Armenia	48	Armenia	3–1	4–1	2022–23 UEFA Nations League B
14	21 September 2022	Hampden Park, Glasgow, Scotland	49	Ukraine	1–0	3–0	2022–23 UEFA Nations League B
15	16 November 2022	Diyarbakır Stadium, Diyarbakır, Turkey	52	Turkey	1–2	1–2	Friendly
16	25 March 2023	Hampden Park, Glasgow, Scotland	53	Cyprus	1–0	3–0	UEFA Euro 2024 qualifying
17	8 September 2023	AEK Arena, Larnaca, Cyprus	57	Cyprus	3–0	3–0	UEFA Euro 2024 qualifying
18	19 November 2023	Hampden Park, Glasgow, Scotland	62	Norway	1–1	3–3	UEFA Euro 2024 qualifying
19	15 November 2024	Hampden Park, Glasgow, Scotland	72	Croatia	1–0	1–0	2024–25 UEFA Nations League A
20	18 November 2024	Stadion Narodowy, Warsaw, Poland	73	Poland	1–0	2–1	2024–25 UEFA Nations League A
21	13 June 2026	Gillette Stadium, Foxborough, United States	87	Haiti	1–0	1–0	2026 FIFA World Cup
22	3 October 2026	Toše Proeski Arena, Skopje, North Macedonia	92	North Macedonia	2–0	2–0	2026–27 UEFA Nations League B
23	13 November 2026	Hampden Park, Glasgow, Scotland	94	North Macedonia	1–0	2–1	2026–27 UEFA Nations League B
24	13 November 2026	Hampden Park, Glasgow, Scotland	94	North Macedonia	2–1	2–1	2026–27 UEFA Nations League B

== Honours ==
St Mirren

- Scottish League Cup: 2012–13

Hibernian

- Scottish Cup: 2015–16
- Scottish Championship: 2016–17

Aston Villa

- UEFA Europa League: 2025–26
- EFL Championship play-offs: 2019

Individual

- SFWA International Player of the Year: 2019–20, 2020–21, 2021–22, 2022–23
- Aston Villa Player of the Season: 2018–19, 2025–26
- Aston Villa Goal of the Season: 2024–25
- Scottish Championship Player of the Season: 2016–17
- Scottish Championship Player of the Month: November 2015, November 2016
- UEFA Europa Conference League Team of the Season: 2023–24
- UEFA Europa League Team of the Season: 2025–26
- 2026 FIFA World Cup Superior Player of the Match award: (Haiti x Scotland)

== See also ==
- List of Scottish football families
- List of Scotland national football team captains
- List of Scotland national football team hat-tricks
- Scottish FA International Roll of Honour
