= Sounds Like Music =

- Genre: Game show
- Created by: Colin Tough
- Presented by: Bobby Crush
- Country of origin: United Kingdom
- Original language: English
- No. of series: 2
- No. of episodes: 48

Production
- Running time: 30 minutes (inc. adverts)
- Production company: TSW

Original release
- Network: ITV
- Release: 6 June 1989 – 11 May 1990

Sounds Like Music was a British game show that aired on ITV from 6 June 1989 to 11 May 1990. It was hosted by Bobby Crush.

== Transmissions ==
Series	Start date	End date	Episodes
1	6 June 1989	7 July 1989	20
2	27 March 1990	11 May 1990	28
