= St Peter the Apostle High School =

School in Clydebank, Scotland

Coordinates: 55.9145°N 4.3980°W

St Peter The Apostle High School

Location
- Kirkoswald Drive; Clydebank, West Dunbartonshire, G81 2DB; Scotland

Information
- Type: Comprehensive
- Motto: Compassion and Hope
- Religious affiliation: Roman Catholic
- Opened: 13 November 2009
- Head Teacher: Mhairi McCarte
- Staff: 150 (approximate) Staff List
- Gender: Coeducational
- Age: 11 to 18
- Enrolment: 1600
- Capacity: 1600
- Colours: Purple, Yellow and Green
- Website: https://sites.google.com/ourcloud.buzz/spta/home

St Peter the Apostle High School is a Roman Catholic high school in Drumry, Clydebank, Scotland. It was formed as an amalgamation of the former St Columba's High School and St Andrew's High School. St Peter the Apostle High School is one of two Roman Catholic secondary schools in West Dunbartonshire.

St Peter the Apostle High School is a Roman Catholic comprehensive school serving the northern part of Clydebank, the village of Duntocher, Faifley, Hardgate and the Drumchapel area of Glasgow. Students come in substantial numbers from Old Kilpatrick, Knightswood and Scotstoun. Five primary schools provide the great majority of the first-year intake including; St Mary's Primary School, St Joseph's Primary School, St Eunan's Primary School, St Stephen's Primary School, and St Clare's Primary School, although a variety of others add to this number.

== History ==
In 2009, West Dunbartonshire Council started a project with Bam construction to create new schools in the area. The previous Catholic secondary schools in Clydebank, St Columba's High School and St Andrew's High School were to be merged to form the new school, the campus for which was built on the sports grounds of St Columba's to allow the existing school to operate during construction of the new building. After the opening of St Peter the Apostle High School, the former St Columba's High School building was demolished, with the new St Eunan's Primary School built on this site. The cost to build the new school was £35m.

== Head Teachers ==
- Mr. Michael Vassie: 2009-2013
- Mrs. Linda Booth: 2013-2023
- Mrs. Mhairi McCarte: 2023–Present

== Alumni ==
- Aisha Toussaint - Actress and Presenter
- Kevin Bridges - Comedian
- John McGinn - Footballer
- Amy Callaghan - Politician
- Tony Gallacher - Footballer
