= Glenrothes High School =

Coordinates: 56°11′55″N 3°11′26″W

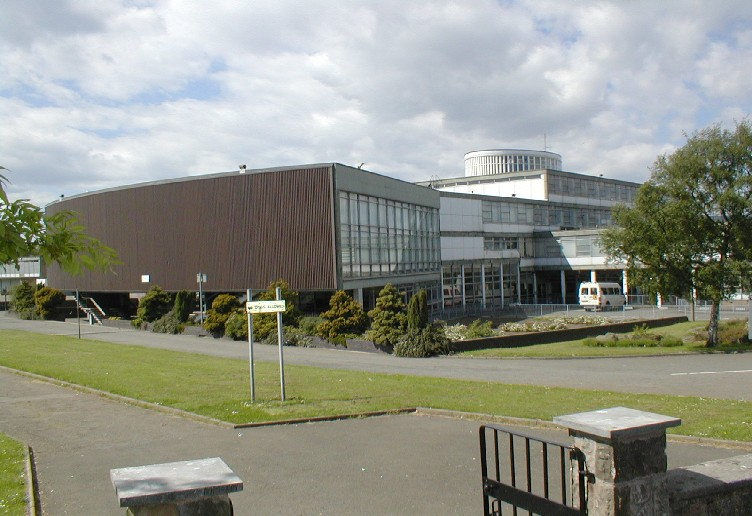
- Glenrothes, Fife; Scotland

Information
- Type: Secondary
- Established: 1966
- Rector: Avril McNeil
- Teaching staff: 70 (approx.)
- Grades: S1-S6
- Enrollment: 860 (approx.)
- Colors: Red, black and gold
- Website: School website

Glenrothes High School is a six-year non-denominational secondary school of approximately 860 pupils located in Glenrothes, Fife, Scotland. The school serves the western/central and northern precincts of Glenrothes drawing primarily from four feeder Primary Schools; Caskieberran, Pitcoudie, Rimbleton and South Parks schools. The school also accepts a number of placing requests from other parts in the town.

== History ==
The building opened in 1966 with the intention of accommodating all of the pupils of the town who were seeking to do "Higher" level examinations. Prior to this older pupils living in Glenrothes had to attend schools in neighbouring towns to continue their highers as the earlier secondary schools in the new town, Glenwood and Auchmuty, only provided for pupils at a junior secondary level. This system operated successfully for a number of years, however changes in the education system at the National level in the 1970s made the system redundant and both Auchmuty and Glenwood were extended and raised to full "high school" status.

In 2007 a modern gameshall was added to the sports facilities available at the school. The school has a Department of Additional Support comprising the former Department of Special Education and Physical Impairment Unit.

The school is distinguished by a cylindrical belvedere feature on the roof. This is a green house which was once used by biology students.

Fife Council announced plans in 2018 to replace the ageing school building and potentially merge it with nearby Glenwood High School. Whilst funding had initially been committed by the council for this, the additional funds required by the Scottish Government were not made available and the plans have been scrapped. Fife Council has instead re-allocated funds allowing for upgrades to each school.

== House system ==
The school operates a house system in which pupils are separated into three different houses which each have their own house colour and a PT of Guidance assigned to each house.

The three houses and colours are:

- Glen Nevis – Red
- Glen Finnan – Yellow
- Glen Coe – Blue

Destination of school leavers 2009/10
	Glenrothes High School	Fife average	Scotland average
Total pupils	864	-	-
Leavers in 2009/10	169	-	-
Higher Education	30%	33%	36%
Further Education	41%	37%	27%
Training	7%	4%	5%
Employment	12%	12%	19%
Unemployment	11%	13%	12%

== School performance ==
The school was inspected in 2003 and 2005 and was considered in 2005 to have made very good progress since the earlier inspection in 2003. It was again inspected in September 2009 and was found to have made further good progress. As of late 2011, the school was working towards gaining the UNICEF-recognised Rights Respecting School Award.

The Scottish Qualifications Credit Framework (SCQF) contains 12 levels ranging from Access at SCQF level 1, up to Doctorate at level 12. SCQF Level 3 refers to the national qualifications taken over two years of study (in S3 and S4) with exams at the end of S4. The proportion of S4 Pupils attaining SCQF Level 3 or above during 2009/10 was 91%, which was marginally below the Fife and Scottish averages of 92%.

In the 2022/2023 academic year, the school recorded a result of over 97% positive destinations for school leavers.

== Notable former students ==
- Mike Soutar, Scottish entrepreneur
- William Allan, Scottish classicist
