= Daniel Prodan =

Romanian footballer (1972–2016)

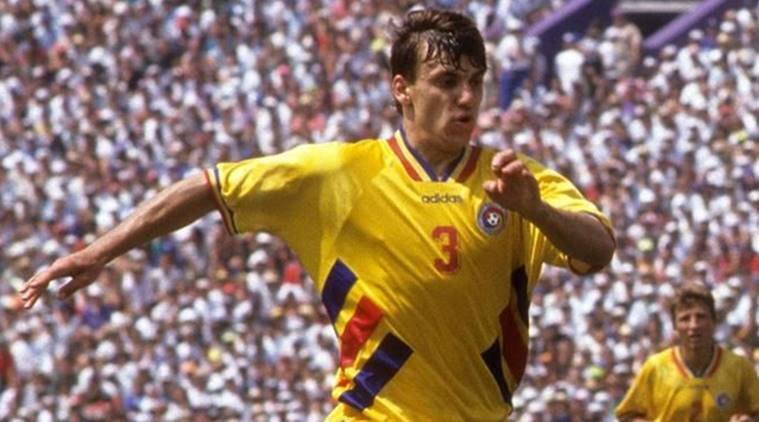
- Prodan with Romania at the 1994 World Cup

Personal information
- Full name: Daniel Claudiu Prodan
- Date of birth: 23 March 1972
- Place of birth: Satu Mare, Romania
- Date of death: 16 November 2016 (aged 44)
- Place of death: Voluntari, Romania
- Height: 1.88 m (6 ft 2 in)
- Position: Centre-back

Youth career
- –1991: Olimpia Satu Mare

Senior career*
Years	Team	Apps	(Gls)
1991–1992	Olimpia Satu Mare	43	(3)
1992–1996	Steaua București	121	(10)
1997–1998	Atlético Madrid	34	(4)
1998–2001	Rangers	0	(0)
2000	→ Steaua București (loan)	1	(0)
2000	→ Rocar București (loan)	15	(3)
2001–2003	Naţional București	12	(0)
2002	→ Messina (loan)	5	(1)
Total		231	(21)

International career
1992–1993	Romania U21	10	(0)
1993–2002	Romania	54	(1)

Managerial career
- 2006: Romania U21
- * Club domestic league appearances and goals

Daniel "Didi" Claudiu Prodan (23 March 1972 – 16 November 2016) was a Romanian professional footballer who played mainly as a centre-back.

In a career marred by injuries, he played mainly for Steaua București and represented the Romania national team in one World Cup and one European Championship.

== Club career ==
Born in Satu Mare, Prodan came to prominence with national giants Steaua București, having signed in late 1992 from his hometown side Olimpia Satu Mare. With the capital club, he won five consecutive Liga I titles, almost always featuring as a starter; his debut in the league came on 8 November in a 3–1 win at Farul Constanța, aged 20.

In January 1997, Prodan moved to Spain with Atlético Madrid. He scored four La Liga goals in only half a season in 1996–97 (17 matches), and appeared in the same number of games in the next. However, it was noted that his disciplinary record was poor, including two red cards.

In the summer of 1998, Prodan joined Rangers (a club against which he had scored a memorable goal for Steaua in the UEFA Champions League in 1995) for £2.2 million, but made no first-team appearances in two-and-a-half years in Scotland due to a serious knee injury, which he sustained whilst with the Colchoneros. Rangers' doctor, Stewart Hillis, later revealed that no medical had been conducted, and the transfer was rushed to completion on the strength of falsified documents; the Glasgow club threatened to sue Atlético Madrid, but backed down and released the player in January 2001.

During the last five years of his career – Rangers included – Prodan only appeared in 33 matches combined while representing four teams, retiring at the age of 31 with Naţional București.

== International career ==
Prodan won 54 caps for Romania between 1993 and 2001, and was in the squads for the 1994 FIFA World Cup (playing every minute at the tournament as the team reached the quarter-finals) and UEFA Euro 1996. His only international goal arrived on 12 November 1994, as he contributed with the winner in a 3–2 victory against Slovakia for the latter competition's qualifiers in Bucharest, with the points helping Romania qualify for the finals.

== Personal life ==
Prodan's younger brother, Ciprian, was also a footballer. On 16 November 2016, Prodan died of a heart attack at the age of 44. The stadium from Satu Mare known as Stadionul Olimpia was renamed in February 2017 as the Stadionul Daniel Prodan in his honor.

== Career statistics ==
Appearances and goals by national team and year
National team	Year	Apps	Goals
Romania	1993	5	0
Romania	1994	17	1
Romania	1995	6	0
Romania	1996	9	0
Romania	1997	7	0
Romania	1998	2	0
Romania	1999	0	0
Romania	2000	3	0
Romania	2001	5	0
Romania	2002	0	0
Total		54	1

Scores and results list Romania's goal tally first, score column indicates score after each Prodan goal.

List of international goals scored by Dorinel Munteanu
No.	Date	Venue	Opponent	Score	Result	Competition
1	12 November 1994	Stadionul Steaua, Bucharest, Romania	Slovakia	3–2	3–2	UEFA Euro 1996 Qualifying

== Honours ==
Steaua București

- Divizia A: 1992–93, 1993–94, 1994–95, 1995–96
- Cupa României: 1991–92, 1995–96
- Supercupa României: 1994, 1995

Rangers

- Scottish Premier League: 1998–99
- Scottish Cup: 1998–99
- Scottish League Cup: 1998–99

Rocar București

- Cupa României runner-up: 2000–01

Național București

- Cupa României runner-up : 2002–03
