= Clydebank High School =

Coordinates: 55°54′47″N 4°24′45″W

Location
- Janetta Street; Clydebank, West Dunbartonshire, G81 3EJ; Scotland

Information
- Type: State School
- Established: 1873
- Local authority: West Dunbartonshire Council
- Head Teacher: Jacqui Lynam
- Staff: 150 FTE
- Gender: Mixed
- Age: 11 to 18
- Enrolment: 1500
- Houses: Bute, Cumbrae, Davaar
- Colours: Chocolate, Gold, Black and Blue
- Accreditation: Charter Mark
- Website: http://www.clydebankhigh.org.uk/

Clydebank High School is a non-denominational secondary school in Clydebank, Scotland. It is one of three non-denominational secondary schools in West Dunbartonshire.

== History ==
The Education (Scotland) Act 1872 created for the first time mandatory education for children aged 5–13. As a result, the Old Kilpatrick School Board made arrangements for the first 'Clydebank School' to be created in the canteen (or 'bothy') of the shipyard. The first day when pupils were enrolled was 11 August 1873.

Prior to this, 'Mrs Pitblado's Adventure school' existed, but her school, which was based in a tenement house, declined to come under the control of the school board (as required by the Education (Scotland) Act) and is therefore not considered part of the heritage of today's school.

After the rise of population in the area caused the creation of the town of Clydebank, a new school building was needed. In 1876, the school board opened the first purpose-built Clydebank High School. Twelve years later, in 1888, the board decided that the school was too small and built another, larger, school on the Kilbowie Road site.

By the middle of the 1930s a new school building was being built at Janetta Street, in the north of Clydebank. During the war the building was hit by a parachute mine but was still usable as a temporary first aid post. The school roll continued to rise in the 1950s and huts had to be assembled in the playgrounds to compensate. To cope with these rising numbers an extension of the building was completed in 1977.

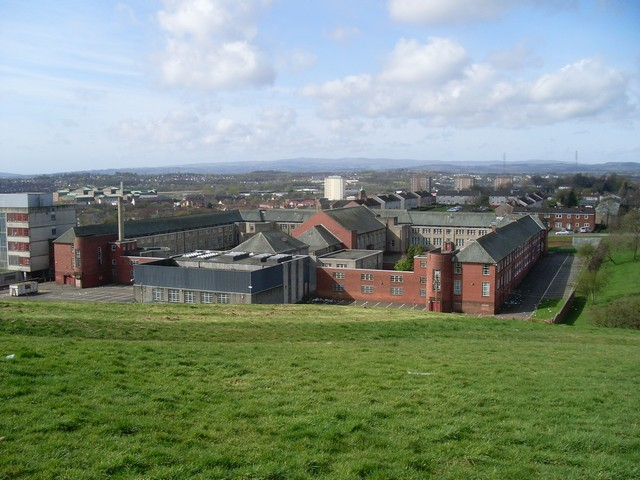
The old school (2009 image)

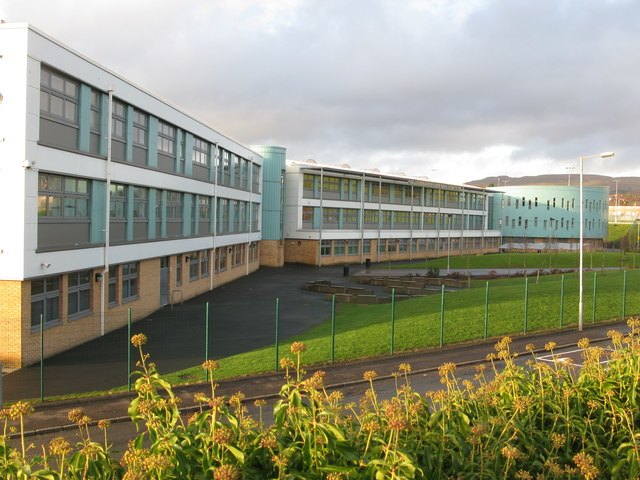
The new school (2013 image)

== Post 2000 events ==
With the decline in the birth rate in the early 2000s, it was decided that the smaller Braidfield High School located nearby in Drumry should be closed and merged with Clydebank High, and in August 2006 this became a reality. A new school had to be built to cope with the increase in pupils and the damage that the structures faced after 70 years of operation. In August 2009, a new school was built on the football pitches of the previous school. The new building has a capacity for 1500 pupils, 150 teaching staff and was built by BAM; it is one of four schools built by the firm in a Public Private Partnership with the local authority.

As with the other vacant site in the town where a school had been (at St Andrew's High in Whitecrook), the Braidfield site lay unused for some years before firm plans were submitted for housing in 2016; construction actually began in 2019.

== Notable former pupils ==
- Kloe - Singer
- Jamie Murray - footballer
- Chris Baillie - track and field athlete
- Ross Baillie - track and field athlete
- Duncan Bannatyne - entrepreneur
- Graeme Clark - musician (Wet Wet Wet)
- Tommy Cunningham - drummer (Wet Wet Wet)
- James Cosmo - actor
- Scott Cuthbert - footballer
- Alan Gow - footballer - Braidfield High
- Finlay Hart - politician
- Asa Hartford - footballer
- Scott Henry - golfer
- Stewart Hillis - cardiologist
- Bobby Hope - footballer
- Christine Jardine - politician (Liberal Democrat MP for Edinburgh West) - Braidfield High
- Donald Macaulay, Baron Macaulay of Bragar
- Fulton Mackay - actor and playwright
- Marti Pellow - singer (Wet Wet Wet)
- Barbara Rafferty - actress
- Colin Tough - journalist and editor
- Alan West, Baron West of Spithead
