= St Columba's High School, Clydebank =

Coordinates: 55.9137°N 4.3996°W

St Columba's High School
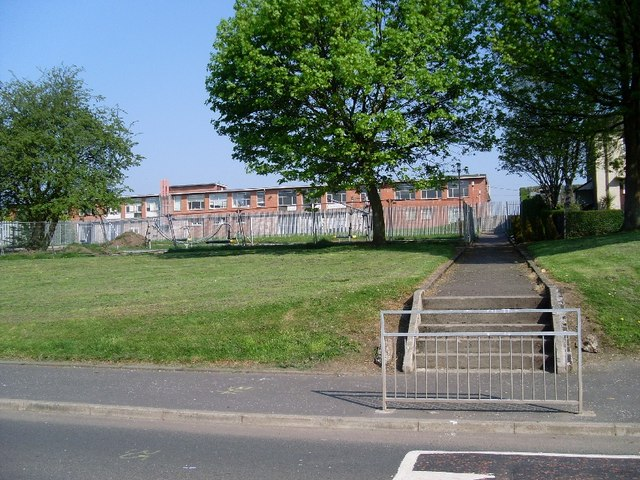

Location
- Gilmour Street; Clydebank, West Dunbartonshire, G81 2BW; Scotland

Information
- Type: State School
- Motto: Labore et Scientia'
- Religious affiliation: Roman Catholic Comprehensive
- Closed: 2009
- Head Teacher: Maureen McGlinchey
- Staff: 65 FTE
- Gender: Mixed
- Age: 11 to 18
- Enrolment: 1200
- Houses: Aiden, Ninian, Kentigern
- Colours: Blue, white, yellow and blue

St Columba's High School was a Roman Catholic comprehensive school in Drumry, Clydebank, West Dunbartonshire, Scotland. It was one of two denominational schools in the town (the other being St Andrew's High) which merged in 2009 to become St Peter the Apostle High School. The school had an inspection by Her Majesty's Inspectorate of Education (HMIE) in 2006 and received positive results.

== History ==
St Columba's High was a six-year Catholic comprehensive school serving the northern part of Clydebank, the village of Duntocher, Faifley, Hardgate and the Drumchapel area of Glasgow. Other pupils come in substantial numbers from Old Kilpatrick, Knightswood and Scotstoun. Five primary schools provided the great majority of the first year intake: St Mary's, St Joseph's, St Eunan's, St Stephen's and St Clare's, although a variety of others added to this number.

== Notable alumni ==
- John McGinn, footballer
- Kevin Bridges, stand-up comedian
