= Shortlist (website) =

British lifestyle website

- Website type: Lifestyle journalism
- Founded: 2007
- Headquarters: London, {{{location_country}}}
- Editors: Gerald Lynch, editor-in-chief
- CEO: Kevin Li Ying (as of 31 March 2025)
- Parent: Future plc
- Current status: Active

Shortlist (previously ShortList) is a lifestyle website and newsletter based in London that covers news, technology, film, television, music, books, and alcohol. It is owned by Future plc. The site began as a free weekly print magazine that was distributed in various cities in the United Kingdom.

== History as a print magazine ==
Former Shortlist logo

ShortList was launched on 20 September 2007 with the slogan "For men with more than one thing on their minds", to differentiate it from the "lads' mags" of the time, such as FHM and Loaded. ShortList was distributed free every Thursday in London, Manchester, Edinburgh, Glasgow, Newcastle, Leeds, Dundee, and Birmingham. In March 2015, ShortList launched a weekly edition in Dubai and Abu Dhabi as a license with APP Media Group, a division of ITP Publishing.

Marking the occasion of ShortList's 10th birthday at the end of September 2017, the team produced a special edition magazine with a collection of photos that featured celebrities and their photographs from 10 years ago. Content included brief product reviews, pub and bar reviews (Pints and Pistachios), recipes, fashion pages, interviews, and a weekly column by Danny Wallace. The title had a circulation of 502,773 (ABC July–December 2017) and took up 58.9% of the total men's lifestyle sector across eight major UK cities with the largest print circulation of all men's magazines in the UK. At launch, ShortList was published by Shortlist Media Ltd., which in 2009 launched Stylist, a similar magazine for women. Another publication, Shortlist Dubai, launched in March 2015.

The magazine's print edition was discontinued in 2018 due to declining advertising revenue. Around 20 staff members were estimated to have lost their jobs as a result of its closure. The magazine released its last issue on 20 December 2018.

== New ownership and transition to a digital model ==
In October 2022, Future plc acquired ShortList. "The acquisition also sees ShortList editor-in-chief, Marc Chacksfield, return to Future, where he was previously editor-in-chief of TechRadar," the company announced in a press release about the purchase.

Gerald Lynch is the current editor-in-chief of ShortList and Chacksfield is content director.

== Awards ==
- Men's Magazine Editor of the Year, BSME Awards, 2009
- New Editor of the Year – Consumer, BSME Awards, – Terri White 2010
- Columnist of the Year, PPA Awards, – Danny Wallace 2011
- Cover of the Year – Jeremy Clarkson, PPA Awards, 2017
