= What's on TV =

British magazine

- Cover of 5–11 October 2024 issue
- Editor: Claire Ruck
- Categories: TV Weeklies
- Frequency: Weekly
- Circulation: 515,842
- Publisher: Future PLC
- Founded: 1991
- Country: United Kingdom
- Based in: London
- Language: English
- Website: whattowatch.com
- ISSN: 2059-0059

What's on TV is a weekly television listings magazine published by Future PLC.

== Overview ==
What's on TV is a weekly UK television magazine. It publishes features, TV listings, news and gossip from soap operas, as well as puzzles and competitions. Its primary focus is on soaps and reality TV, but documentaries and dramas are also covered.

It was launched in March 1991, after the monopoly on broadcast programming listings magazines ended and the market was opened up. Before this, only two TV magazines were available: Radio Times for BBC listings and TVTimes for ITV and, from 1982, Channel 4 listings. Two other magazines appeared on the market at the same time – TV Quick and the short-lived TV Plus.

Early covers of What's on TV usually featured TV stars and programmes, but now they almost exclusively promote soap stories.

In January 2007, Time UK (then still IPC) launched a soaps and TV website branded as What's on TV, which focuses on plot spoilers and catch-ups for EastEnders, Coronation Street, Emmerdale, Hollyoaks, Doctors, Neighbours and Home and Away, as well as reality TV and drama. Its weekly podcast Soap Secrets has discussions on soap storylines, and the podcast Bingewatch talks about the TV offerings on the streaming services such as Netflix.

What's on TV belongs to Future PLC's group of weekly television listings magazines. Other TV titles in the group include the long-established TVTimes, and TV & Satellite Week.

Time Inc. UK merged TV Easy with What's on TV in September 2014.

In April 2020 TI Media was purchased by Future plc.
