= Shortlist Media Limited =

British publishing company

Shortlist Media was a publisher and media platform based in the UK. Founded in 2007, Shortlist Media published magazines, ShortList and Stylist, and digital brands, Emerald Street and Mr. Hyde. In 2018, Shortlist Media announced that it would be rebranding as The Stylist Group, and shifting focus to expanding its Stylist brand. The Stylist Group is wholly owned by a Scottish publishing company, DC Thomson. Ella Dolphin is the current CEO.

== History ==
Shortlist Media Ltd was founded in 2007 by Mike Soutar, Tim Ewington, Karl Marsden, Phil Hilton, and Matt Phare.

Shortlist Media introduced the freemium model in 2007 when it launched ShortList as a free, weekly magazine.

In 2015, DC Thomson gained full ownership of Shortlist Media after buying the remaining 50% of the company that it did not own. DC Thomson was among the founding investors of Shortlist Media.

Shortlist Media announced in October 2018 that co-founder Mike Soutar would be leaving the company and stepping down from his role as chairman.

In November 2018, Shortlist Media announced that print operations for ShortList would be ending, and the publisher would rebrand to The Stylist Group.

== Audience ==
Known as the Met Set (short for the Metropolitan Set), Shortlist Media’s audience is described as urban dwellers, who are time-poor but thought-rich.

‘They earn more than average and half of the men who participated in the study see themselves as feminists. [...] they are people who engage, like to talk and influence their friends. [...] the average ShortList / Stylist reader is around 31. They’re doing well in business, they work out a lot, and like to have a drink.’

== Family ==
In November 2016, Shortlist Media launched its in-house content studio, Family. Editors across all departments of Shortlist Media share knowledge and produce content for brands trying to reach the Met Set audience. These brands have included Ford, Not On The High Street and Givenchy.

‘“In just a year, Family’s contribution to Shortlist Media revenues has risen from around 30% to around 50%,” says Shortlist Media chief marketing officer Sophie Robinson’

== Awards ==
- Launch of the Year, BSME Awards, 2008
- Publisher of the Year, PPA Awards, 2009
- Publisher of the Year (turnover under £5m), PPA Awards, 2009
- Best Innovation: Winner: Mediacom for the Sony Mobile project with Shortlist Media, PPA Ad Awards, 2014
- Best Collaboration: Winner: Good Stuff for the Kopparberg project with Shortlist Media, PPA Ad Awards, 2014
- ‘This French Life by Stylist Magazine with Chambord’, UK Sponsorship Awards, 2017
- Family: Chambord as Best use of Native/Sponsored advertising content, DigiDay European Content Marketing Awards, 2018
