= Stylist (magazine) =

British magazine

- Frequency: Weekly
- First issue: September 2009
- Company: The Stylist Group (DC Thomson)
- Country: United Kingdom
- Based in: London
- Language: English
- Website: stylist.co.uk

Stylist is a British magazine for women that began publication in the London around September 2009.

== History ==
In 2009, Ella Dolphin was founding CEO, and Lisa Smosarski editor-in-chief. Stylist was published by Shortlist Media Ltd, the inaugural edition appearing around September 2009.

After the closure of the print edition of ShortList, Shortlist Media rebranded as "The Stylist Group".

== Audience and content ==
Stylist targets affluent 20 to 40-year-old female commuters with high end content that includes fashion, travel, beauty, people, and careers news. The magazine aims to take an intelligent approach, covering a broader range of culture and tackling issues women face in their professional and personal lives.

Stylist has featured Hollywood stars Angelina Jolie, Penélope Cruz, Jennifer Lopez, and Jennifer Aniston on the cover as well as Hillary Clinton, comedian Tina Fey, activist X González and classicist Mary Beard. The magazine has commissioned children's author and illustrator Quentin Blake and artist Rob Ryan to create bespoke front covers. The advertisers of the magazine have included Escada, Hugo Boss, Guerlain, and Yves Saint Laurent.

Stylist hosts regular Stylist Network Events, including Stylist Live, which includes career-focused talks with business entrepreneurs, as well as curated shopping and fitness workouts, where an average of 200 Stylist readers buy tickets to attend the London-based sessions.

== Distribution and expansion ==
Stylist is distributed free every month in London, Manchester, Leeds, Edinburgh, Glasgow, Liverpool, and Birmingham, as well as in French Connection stores, airport lounges, city centre offices, and gyms.

Stylist Magazine debuted online in September 2010.

Stylist began sending out "Stylist Loves", a daily newsletter with advice on work, fashion, beauty, and current events, in April 2019.

In April 2013, Groupe Marie Claire and Shortlist Media collaborated to launch Stylist's weekly edition in France. The publication was given out for free every Thursday in nine cities, including Paris, Lyon, Marseille, Aix-en-Provence, Toulouse, Bordeaux, Nantes, Lille, and Strasbourg.

Stylist magazine was previously available in a tablet edition, but this was discontinued in 2016 after the closure of Apple Newsstand.

During the COVID-19 pandemic, Stylist ceased producing paper copies of the magazine and switched to an online-only model as members of the public were encouraged to stay at home during the lockdown.

== Subscription products ==
In early 2021, Stylist launched a paid content fitness platform Strong Women Training Club, offering 1 and 12-month subscription options.

An online version of the digital magazine was launched in mid-2021 to help readers access the content during the COVID-19 pandemic, offering three-, six- and 12-month subscription options.

== Awards ==
Awards include:

- Launch of the Year 2010, BSME
- Media Woman of the Future: Stylist's editor Lisa Smosarski, Women of the Future Awards
- New Product of the Year 2010, Growing Business Awards
- Brand of 2010, Brand Republic
- Winner of Johnson & Johnson Best Weekly Beauty Journalist
