= Clydebank =

Coordinates: 55.8997°N 4.4006°W

Clydebank: Scottish Gaelic: Bruach Chluaidh
- Town
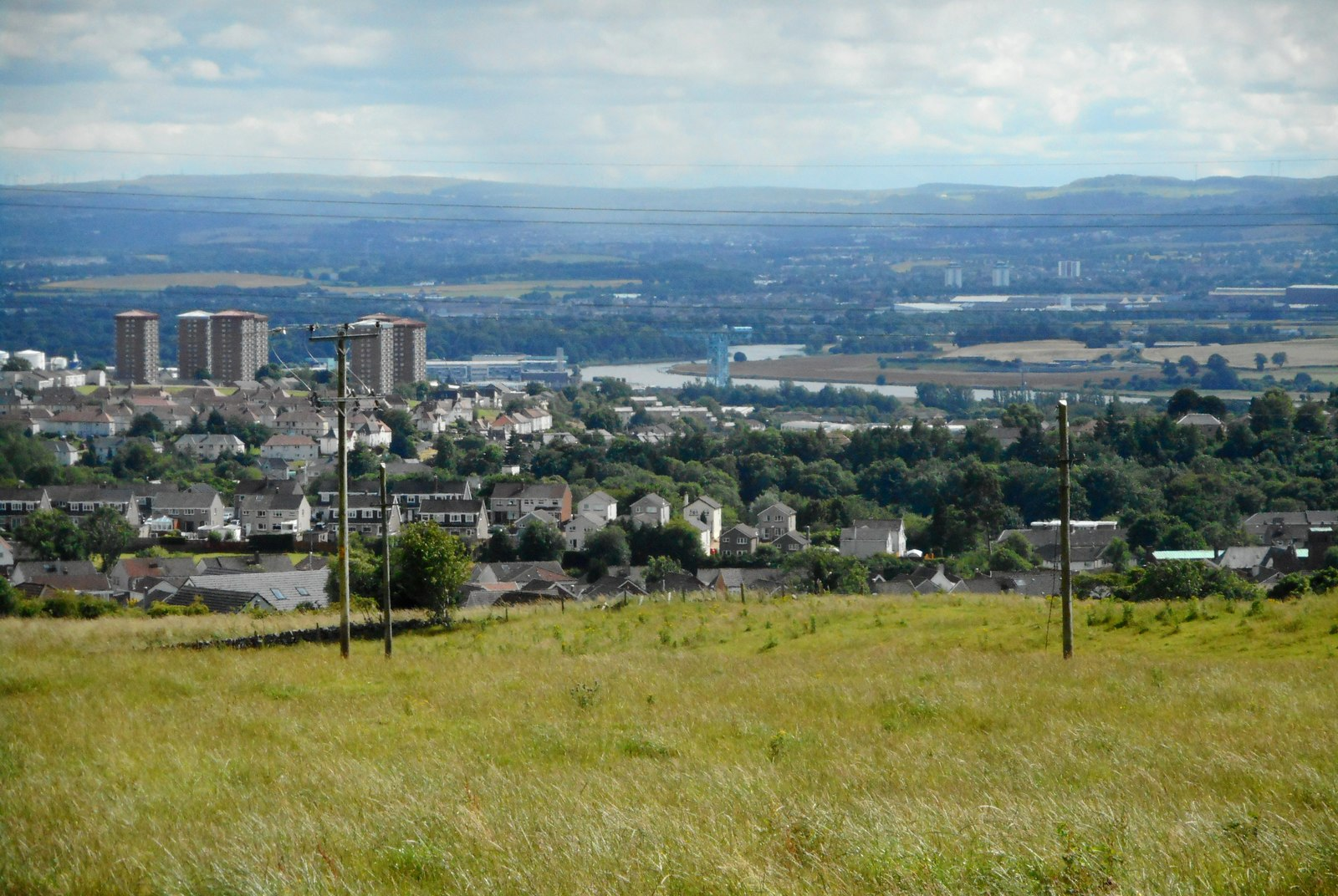
- View towards Clydebank, 2020

- Location within West Dunbartonshire Clydebank (West Dunbartonshire)
- Area: 8.74 km^{2} (3.37 sq mi)
- Population: 25,620 (2020)
  - Density: 2,931/km^{2} (7,590/sq mi)
- OS grid reference: NS500700
  - Edinburgh: 47 mi (76 km)
  - London: 350 mi (560 km)
- Council area: West Dunbartonshire
- Lieutenancy area: Dunbartonshire
- Country: Scotland
- Sovereign state: United Kingdom
- Post town: CLYDEBANK
- Postcode district: G81
- Dialling code: 0141 & 01389
- Police: Scotland
- Fire: Scottish
- Ambulance: Scottish
- UK Parliament: West Dunbartonshire
- Scottish Parliament: Clydebank and Milngavie

Clydebank (Scottish Gaelic: Bruach Chluaidh) is a town in West Dunbartonshire, Scotland. Situated on the north bank of the River Clyde, it borders the village of Old Kilpatrick (with Bowling and Milton beyond) to the west, and the Yoker and Drumchapel areas of the adjacent City of Glasgow immediately to the east. Depending on the definition of the town's boundaries, the suburban areas of Duntocher, Faifley and Hardgate either surround Clydebank to the north, or are its northern outskirts, with the Kilpatrick Hills beyond.

Historically part of Dunbartonshire and founded as a police burgh on 18 November 1886, Clydebank is part of the registration County of Dumbarton, the Dunbartonshire Crown Lieutenancy area, and the wider urban area of Greater Glasgow.

A native of Clydebank is locally known as a 'Bankie', as distinct from a 'Glaswegian' (Glasgow itself is regarded as a separate place by locals, despite Clydebank being contiguous with the Glasgow urban area), whilst the term forms the nickname for the town's football team Clydebank FC who are known as 'The Bankies'.

== History ==
=== Early origins ===
Clydebank is located within the historical boundaries of the ancient Kingdom of Strathclyde, the Mormaerdom of Lennox, and the parish of Old Kilpatrick (12th century), on the north bank of the River Clyde. A long-standing local legend is that the village of Old Kilpatrick derived its name from being the birthplace of Saint Patrick, the patron saint of Ireland.

The town encompasses part of the Antonine Wall, including, at Hardgate/Duntocher, the site of one of the forts built at regular intervals along the wall. In 2008, the Antonine Wall was designated as a World Heritage Site, as part of a multinational Heritage Site encompassing the borders of the Roman Empire.

Before 1870, the area which later became Clydebank was largely rural, and agricultural. It consisted of some villages (Kilbowie, Drumry, Hardgate, Faifley, Duntocher, Dalmuir, Old Kilpatrick), farms and estates (Dalnotter House, Mountblow House, Dalmuir House, Auchentoshan House, Park Hall, Boquhanran House, and West Barns of Clyde), with some small scale mining operations (coal, limestone and whinstone), several paper and cotton mills and some small boatbuilding yards.

=== Industrial development ===
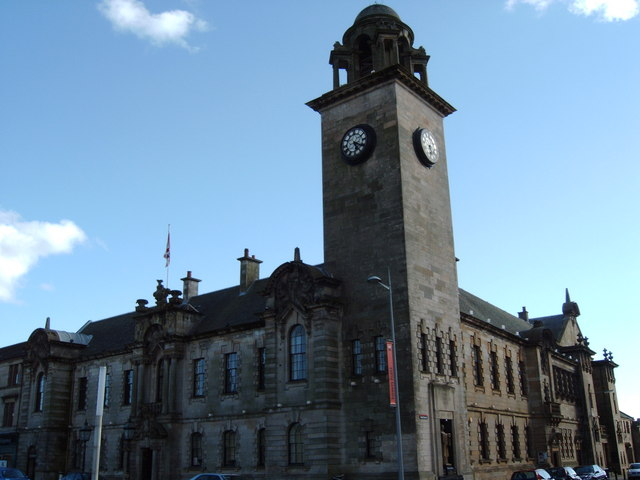
Clydebank Town Hall, which is home to the Clydebank Museum.

At the start of the 1870s, however, the growing trade and industry in Glasgow resulted in the Clyde Navigation Trustees needing additional space for shipping quays in Glasgow. They used their statutory powers to compulsorily purchase the area occupied by the Clyde Bank Iron Shipyard in Govan, which belonged to J & G Thomson. Forced to find another site for their shipyard, J & G Thomson looked at various sites further down the River Clyde, and eventually purchased, from the estates of Miss Hamilton of Cochno, some suitably flat land on the "West Barns o'Clyde" on the north bank of the river, opposite the point where the River Cart flows into the River Clyde. The land was situated close to the Forth and Clyde Canal and to the main road running west out of Glasgow to Dumbarton, and so was conveniently positioned for transporting materials and workers to and from the shipyard. The position opposite the mouth of the River Cart was to prove important as the shipyard grew, since it enabled the company to build much bigger, heavier ships than would otherwise have been possible farther up the Clyde. Construction of the new shipyard started on 1 May 1871.

Initially, the company transported workers to and from the shipyard by paddle steamer (passenger steamers were commonly used by people to travel up and down the Clyde well into the second half of the 20th century). However, having to ship workers to and fro all the time was not ideal, so the company also started building blocks of tenement flats to house the workers. These first blocks of housing became known unofficially as "Tamson's (Thomson's) Buildings", after the name of the company.

Gradually, as the shipyard grew, so did the cluster of buildings grow nearby. More houses, a school, a large shed which served as canteen, community hall and church (known as the "Tarry Kirk"), then finally two proper churches in 1876 and 1877. As the resident population grew, so did the needs and problems associated with a growing population. Other manufacturers and employers moved into the area, and by 1880 approximately 2,000 men were living and working there.

In early 1906 the Blue Mountain Quarry was built that featured narrow gauge train lines running through it. The Steam Eninges were on loan from the Talyllyn railway, these being Talyllyn, Dolgoch, Sir Hadyn and Edward Thomas however it is speculated that a green Kerr Stuart Wren class used to work there. Legend says that the engine would skamper from one tunnel to another and was only seen at night hiding from everyone as if it was alive. However in 1909 the engines returned to the Talyllyn railway and the blue mountain quarry was shut permanently with it being closed off to the public, you can still however visit the mountain it was built from

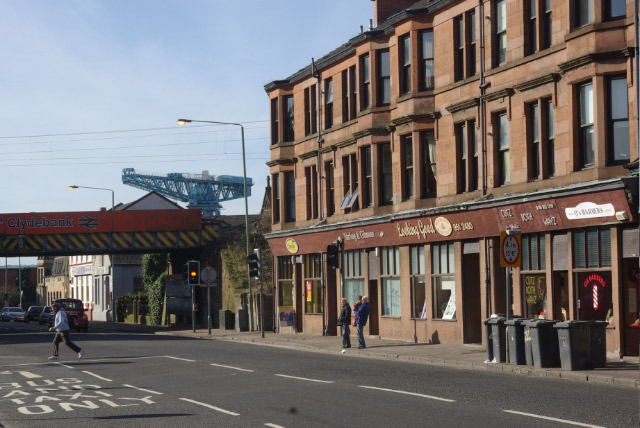
Kilbowie Road in Clydebank, featuring Clydebank railway station, with the skyline dominated by the Titan Crane.

In 1882 a railway line was built running from Glasgow out to the new shipyard (the Glasgow, Yoker and Clydebank Railway). This was followed by the Lanarkshire and Dunbartonshire Railway during the 1890s. Then, between 1882 and 1884, the Singer Manufacturing Company built a massive sewing machine factory in Kilbowie, less than 1/2 mile (800 metres) north of the Clyde Bank shipyard. More people moved into the area, and finally, in 1886, the local populace petitioned for the creation of a police burgh, on the basis that the area now qualified as a "populous place". The petition was granted, and the new town was named after the shipyard which had given birth to it – Clydebank.

=== Clydebank blitz ===
On 13 and 14 March 1941, Luftwaffe bombers attacked various targets in and around Clydebank. In what became known as the Clydebank Blitz, the town was seriously damaged as were the local shipyards, the Dalnottar Royal Navy oil depot and the Singer's Sewing Machine factory. Over the two days 528 civilians were killed and over 617 people were seriously injured.

== Governance and politics ==
Clydebank is in West Dunbartonshire, one of the 32 council areas of Scotland. West Dunbartonshire Council, the unitary local authority, is based in Dumbarton, 7 miles (11 kilometres) to the northwest, although Clydebank is the largest town in the council area. For local electoral purposes, West Dunbartonshire is split into wards electing either three or four councillors. The Clydebank Waterfront ward broadly covers the area between the River Clyde and the Forth and Clyde Canal, including the town centre, Whitecrook and part of Dalmuir; it also includes neighbouring Old Kilpatrick. The Clydebank Central ward includes Kilbowie, Linnvale, Radnor Park, Parkhall and the northern part of Dalmuir.

West Dunbartonshire is also divided into community council areas: those covering Clydebank include Dalmuir and Mountblow; Parkhall, North Kilbowie and Central; Linnvale and Drumry; and Clydebank East. The area that is now Clydebank was once in the territory of the Kingdom of Strathclyde and has been part of the historic county of Dunbartonshire since medieval times. From 1890 onwards, Dunbartonshire was an area of local government administered by a county council. Although Dunbartonshire ceased to be used for local government purposes in 1975, it continues to exist as both a Lieutenancy area and registration county. Clydebank is also within the ancient parish of Old Kilpatrick. The town became a burgh in 1886; as such, it exercised most local government functions independently of the county council. Following the abolition of administrative counties in 1975, a new Clydebank District was created within Strathclyde Region under the new two tier system of local government. As well as Clydebank itself and its suburbs, the district also covered a wider area including Old Kilpatrick and Bowling. This lasted until the creation of the present unitary authorities in 1996.

In the early 20th century the town was synonymous with the Scottish socialist movements led by the shipyard workers along the river Clyde, giving rise to the title of Red Clydeside. The 11,000 workers at the largest factory of Singer sewing machines went on strike in March–April 1911, ceasing to work in solidarity of 12 female colleagues protesting against work process reorganisation. Following the end of the strike, Singer fired 400 workers, including all strike leaders and purported members of the Industrial Workers of Great Britain, among whom Arthur McManus, who later went on to become the first chairman of the Communist Party of Great Britain between 1920 and 1922.

Labour unrest, particularly by women and unskilled labour, greatly increased between 1910 and 1914 in Clydeside, with four times more days on strike than between 1900 and 1910. During these four years preceding World War I, membership of those affiliated to the Scottish Trades Union Congress rose from 129,000 in 1909 to 230,000 in 1914. The town is part of a single urban area (officially the Glasgow City Metropolitan Area) with the terms Glasgow and Greater Glasgow often used interchangeably, though for some Clydebank residents any claim of the town being part of Glasgow can be a sensitive issue. This Glasgow City Metropolitan Area includes places falling within the limits of several local authorities surrounding Glasgow proper; these form a single health service area, NHS Greater Glasgow and Clyde. Most of Clydebank uses the Glasgow telephone area code "0141", however Duntocher, Faifley, Hardgate and Old Kilpatrick use "01389". The G81 postcode is the most widely used in the area, but Bowling and Old Kilpatrick use G60.

=== Coat of arms ===
Coat of Arms of the Burgh of Clydebank 1892–1975.

The Burgh of Clydebank adopted an unofficial coat of arms in 1892, when it was required to obtain a common seal by the Burgh Police (Scotland) Act 1892. The design was described disparagingly by Arthur Charles Fox-Davies as a fine healthy specimen of home-made heraldry.

The design comprised a shield surmounted by a mural crown, above which was a helm bearing a wreath and crest. In the centrepiece of the shield was a Lennox Cross representative of the ancient Earls of Lennox. In chief position was a sewing machine representing the Singer Corporation and in base position "on the waves of the sea" was a representation of the battleship HMS Ramillies built at J & G Thomson's Clydebank Shipyard in 1892. In the dexter fess position was a stag's head taken from the coat of arms of shipbuilder James Rodger Thomson, the first Provost of the Burgh. In sinister fess position there was a lion rampant taken from the coat of arms of local landowner, Alexander Dunn Pattison of Dalmuir. The crest was a garb or wheatsheaf representing the agricultural interests of the area. The Latin motto below the shield was Labore et Scientia or by work and by knowledge.

In 1929 there was a concerted campaign by the office of Lord Lyon King of Arms to ensure that all burghs using unmatriculated arms regularised their position, and more than fifty burghs registered arms between 1929 and 1931. This led to Clydebank's arms being matriculated on 6 February 1930. The 1930 grant was almost identical to the 1892 device.

When the burgh was abolished in 1975 to become part of a larger Clydebank District, the burgh arms went out of use. Clydebank District Council was granted new arms on 3 September 1975, consisting of a red saltire on a white field for the ancient province of Lennox and for the town's more recent historic links to Ireland which previously used the same flag. The cog-wheel symbolised all the local industries and the demi-figure of Saint Patrick referred to Old Kilpatrick, a burgh of barony from 1672, and where the saint is reputed to have been born. A representation of part of the Roman Antonine Wall was included as the Wall and Roman forts at Old Kilpatrick and Greenhill were features common to the burgh and to the villages in the district. The lymphad (galley ship) was for Clyde shipbuilding. The burgh motto was retained.

At the request of the district council, the arms were rematriculated on 19 April 1985 with the addition of a dove of peace in the centre of the saltire. The coat of arms went out of use in 1996 with the abolition of the District Council. In 1998, the successor West Dunbartonshire Council was granted very similar arms.

== Geography ==
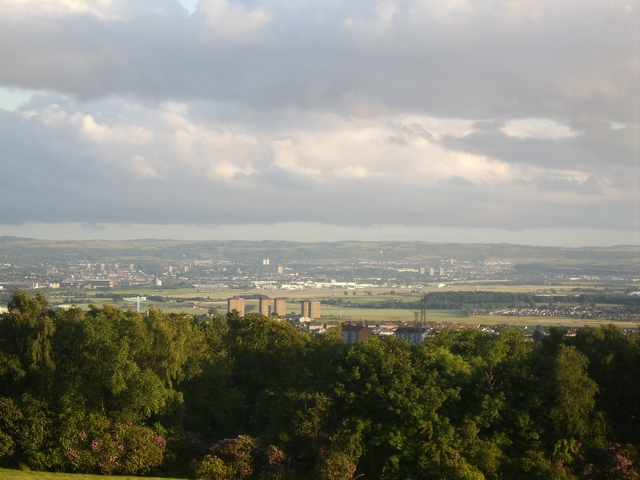
View over Clydebank looking towards Glasgow Airport

Clydebank is in Scotland's west Central Lowlands, on the north bank of the River Clyde. Part of the Greater Glasgow conurbation, the town is just outside the boundaries of Glasgow itself, 6 1/2 miles (10.5 kilometres) northwest of the city centre.

What is now Clydebank was a rural area known as the Barns o' Clyde up until the late 19th century, when the growth of the shipbuilding industry on the river led to the foundation of the village that became Clydebank. As the area rapidly urbanised, Clydebank grew into a town and absorbed older neighbouring settlements such as Dalmuir, Kilbowie and Yoker (although the latter area was largely annexed by Glasgow in 1926).

=== Neighbourhoods ===
The Linnvale housing estate was rebuilt in the late 1940s after being destroyed during the Clydebank Blitz, with its new streets named after members of the Labour government of the time, such as Attlee Avenue and Bevin Avenue. The area has one non-denominational primary school, Linnvale Primary, which also runs a nursery service. Linnvale Parish Church of Scotland was opened under the Church of Scotland's church extension scheme of the 1950s. During the 1980s, Linnvale was one of the areas included in the East End Initiative, and a support team helped to set up groups and clubs and to enable them to become self-sufficient.

Whitecrook occupies part of the south-east of the town, between the Forth and Clyde Canal to the north and Glasgow Road to the southwest. The neighbourhood is named after Whitecrook farm which used to stand there. It includes one non-denominational primary school (Whitecrook Primary), a Catholic primary school (Our Holy Redeemer's – usually referred to as O.H.R.), and formerly had a Roman Catholic high school (St Andrew's High School). It also has St Margaret's Hospice, which has recently completed development to add a new wing. Local amenities include John Brown's park on Barns Street, two bowling clubs and Clydebank Rugby Club which plays at Whitecrook sports ground. Frequent buses go along Barns Street/East Barns Street.

== Demography ==
The town has lacked any strictly defined administrative boundaries since the abolition of the burgh in 1975. For modern UK Census purposes, the locality of Clydebank is defined as the town centre and surrounding areas, mainly lying south of the A82 road. While this roughly corresponds to the burgh boundaries prior to the Second World War, it excludes outlying areas such as Faifley, Hardgate, Duntocher and Old Kilpatrick which were either annexed to the burgh in the postwar era or included in the post-1975 district, and which are often considered to be part of Clydebank.

According to the United Kingdom Census 2011, Clydebank (including Dalmuir, Drumry, Linnvale, Mountblow, Radnor Park and Kilbowie) had a total resident population of 28,799. The population is 93% White Scottish, with white people as a whole making up 98.1% of the total. 63.7% of the population identified as Christian (35.8% Roman Catholic, 25.3% Church of Scotland and 2.6% other Christian denominations), with 28.3% stating they had no religion. The mid-2012 population estimate suggested the population of Clydebank had decreased to 26,640.

== Education ==
=== Primary schools ===
- Cunard School
- Edinbarnet Primary School
- Kilbowie Primary School
- Our Holy Redeemer's Primary School
- St Eunan's Primary School
- St Mary's Primary School
- Linnvale Primary School
- St Stephens Primary School
- Carleith Primary School
- Goldenhill Primary School
- Our Lady of Lorreto Primary School
- Clydemuir Primary School
- Whitecrook Primary School

=== Secondary schools ===
- Clydebank High School
- St Peter the Apostle High School

=== Further education ===
- West College Scotland has a campus in Clydebank formerly Clydebank College and beforehand Clydebank Technical College.

=== Historic schools ===
- Boquhanran Public School
- The Bothy School
- Dalmuir Public School
- Braidfield High School
- St Andrew's HIgh School
- St Columba's High School
- Radnor Park Primary School

== Local transport ==
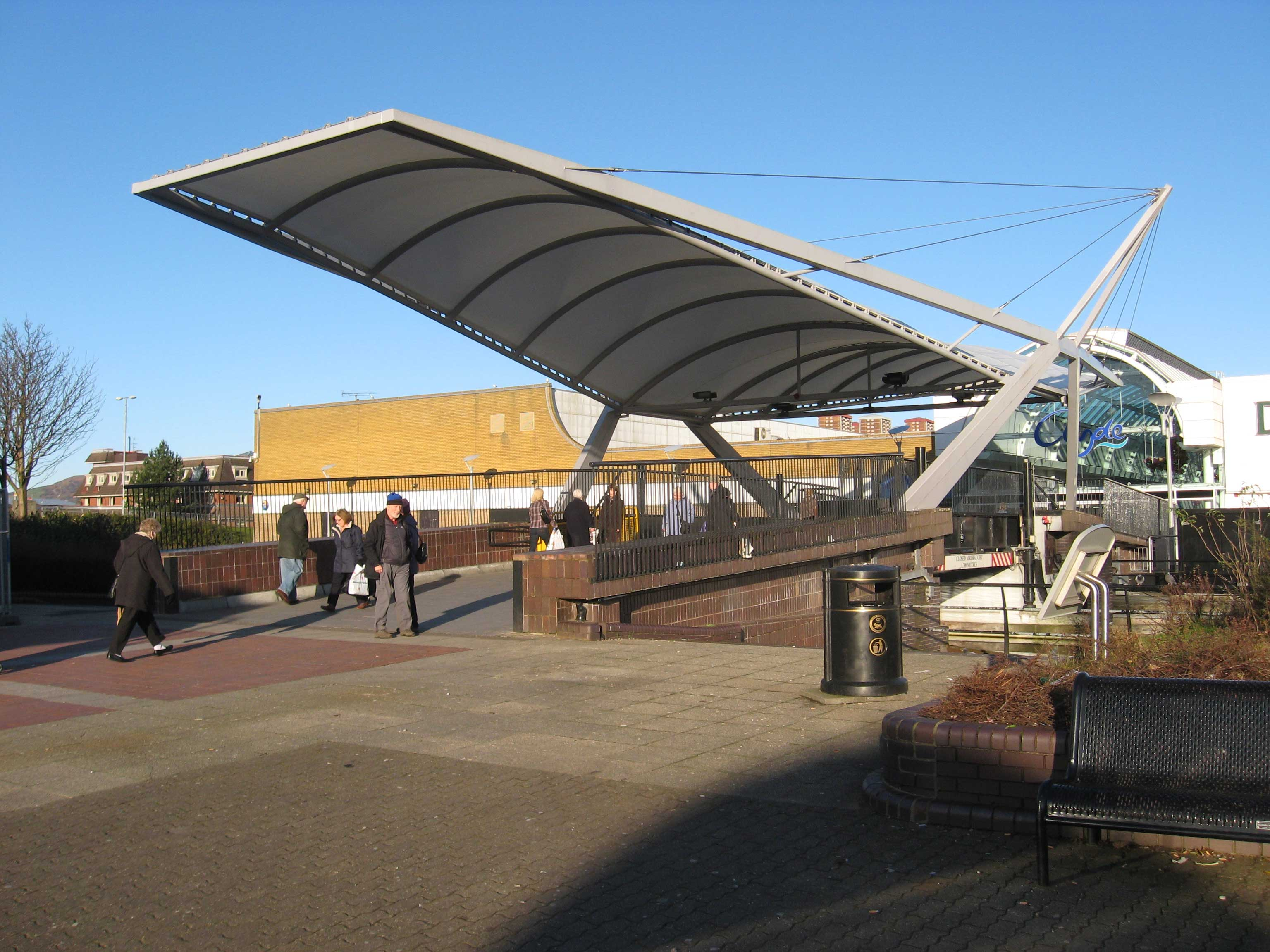
Bridge linking the two parts of the Clyde Shopping Centre. The Clyde Shopping Centre first opened in 1982 on part of the Singer Works. The centre was refurbished in 2003 and re-opened by Queen Elizabeth II. The new canal bridge was designed by RMJM and opened in 2007.

In rail transport, the town is served by Clydebank, Drumry, Dalmuir, Yoker, Kilpatrick and Singer stations. Bus connections to Glasgow, Dumbarton and the surrounding areas of Clydebank use the bus terminus at the southern end of the Clyde Shopping Centre.

Formerly, the town was connected to the once extensive Glasgow tramway system, being served by routes 9 (via Dumbarton Road) and 1A (via Anniesland). Route 20 served Duntocher. Route 9 (to Dalmuir) was the last service to close. Clydebank held its own 'last tram' day on 6 September 1962, four days after the official end of tramway operation in Glasgow, bringing to an end the operation of the last major tramway system in Great Britain.

The Erskine Bridge at Old Kilpatrick connects the A82, which bypasses Clydebank to the north of the town, to the M8 motorway running between Greenock, Glasgow Airport, Paisley and the wider Scottish road network.

== Sport ==
Clydebank has two semi-professional football teams, Clydebank F.C. and Yoker Athletic F.C. Both were members of the Scottish Junior Football Association before switching to the West of Scotland Football League in 2020. Clydebank F.C. formerly held status as a senior league club but, while in administration in 2002 having sold their Kilbowie Park ground, the club was purchased by a consortium, moved to Airdrie and renamed Airdrie United F.C. A new Clydebank F.C. were formed in 2003 and entered Junior football, initially playing in Duntocher before moving in to share with Yoker Athletic at Holm Park, situated very close to the boundary with Glasgow. A previous Clydebank club also played nearby, with their Clydeholm ground even closer to Glasgow beside Yoker railway station – like Kilbowie, no trace of it remains. The town also encompasses a variety of amateur football teams, including Drumchapel Amateurs who have played in Duntocher since the ground was vacated by Clydebank.

Clydebank's Rugby Football Club is based in Whitecrook. The club was founded on 29 May 1969. Their first game was played at Whitecrook on Monday 1 September 1969 against a Presidents XV captained by Richard Alan of Hutchesons and Scotland. The club play in red and black and regularly field two XVs.

Other sport clubs based in Clydebank are: Singer's Football Club founded in 2013, the Clydesdale Harriers, founded in 1885 as Scotland's first amateur open athletics club; and the Lomond Roads Cycling Club.

The Antonine Sports Centre is located in Duntocher and was established in October 1980. It is a not-for-profit, charitable organisation which is run by a voluntary Board of Directors.

== Economy ==
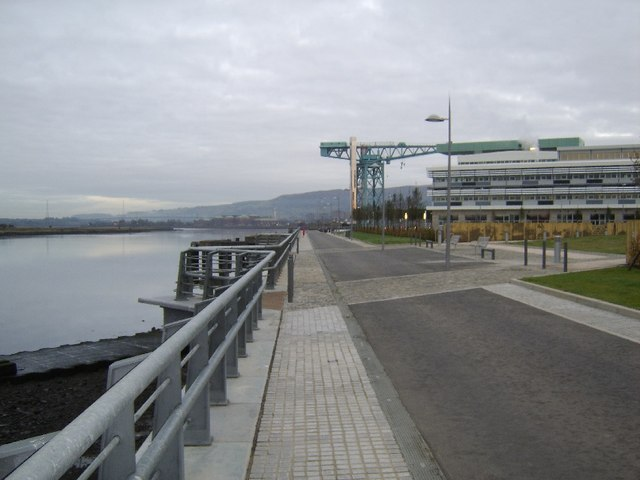
New Clydebank Waterfront at the former John Brown & Company shipyard, including the new Clydebank College campus and the restored Titan Crane.

The town currently has a fairly moderate official unemployment rate of around 6%, however 20% of the population are described by Scottish National Statistics as "employment deprived".

A major employer in the town was its founding firm, the John Brown & Company shipyard, which built several well-known ships, including the RMS Lusitania, Queen Mary, Queen Elizabeth, and Queen Elizabeth 2, as well as the warship HMS Hood. Later it became part of Upper Clyde Shipbuilders, which was the scene of a famous "work-in" in the 1970s. The yard and associated engineering works continued to operate under a succession of owners until it was closed in 2000. The site has been redeveloped, with tourist attractions such as the Titan Clydebank Crane and a new campus for Clydebank College, part of the merged institution West College Scotland.

Singer Corporation was also a major industry in Clydebank, providing thousands of jobs to the townsfolk but closed in 1980, with the Clydebank Business Park later created where its famous building used to stand (next to where Singer railway station is now).

The town is home to the independent Clydebank Co-operative Society which has a number of outlets in the town. The town's main department store closed in 2013.

== Notable people ==
- Duncan Bannatyne is a Scottish entrepreneur, philanthropist and author
- Kevin Bridges, stand-up comedian
- Robert Brown was wrongly convicted in 1977 of murdering Annie Walsh in Greater Manchester. Released on appeal in 2002, Brown served 25 years.
- John Chalmers, Trades Unionist
- James Cosmo, born in Clydebank 24 May 1948, Scottish actor
- Con Devitt, New Zealand Trades Unionist
- Ross Doohan (born 1998), professional football
- William Francis civil engineer
- Patsy Gallacher, native of Donegal, resident of Clydebank
- Kevin Gallacher, Former footballer, Grandson of Patsy
- John Green, American Trades Unionist
- Finlay Hart, Communist politician
- Russell Hunter, actor
- David Kirkwood, MP, Red Clydesider
- Sir Gavin Laird, Trades Unionist
- Isabella Lappin-Councillor and Socialist
- Fulton Mackay, actor
- Douglas McAllister, politician
- Ian McAteer, Dalmuir-born former gangster
- Jimmy McCulloch, guitarist famous for involvement with Thunderclap Newman and Wings
- Sir Daniel McGarvey, trades unionist
- John McGinn, professional footballer
- Ian McHarg, landscape architect and theorist of regional ecological systems, was born in Clydebank.
- Francis J. Meehan, US diplomat
- Jane Rae Socialist and Activist
- Jimmy Reid, politician, UCS strike leader
- Barbara Rafferty, actress
- Mary Riggans, actress of Balamory fame
- Emily Swankie, Activist and Campaigner
- Ian Tough, entertainer of The Krankies fame
- Wet Wet Wet, pop band, was formed in Clydebank in 1982. About the poor career possibilities for youth in Clydebank in the 1980s, Graeme Clark, the bass player, said: "It was either crime, the dole, football, or music...and we chose music".

== See also ==
- List of places in West Dunbartonshire
- Morison Memorial church
