= TV & Satellite Week =

British television listings magazine

- Cover of 7–13 December 2024 issue, featuring Wallace & Gromit
- Editor: Claire Ruck
- Categories: TV magazines
- Frequency: Weekly
- Circulation: 126,425 (ABC Jan – Jun 2016); Print and digital editions
- Founded: 1993
- Company: Future Publishing
- Country: United Kingdom
- Based in: London
- Language: English
- Website: https://www.whatsontv.co.uk/

TV & Satellite Week is a television listings magazine published in the United Kingdom by Future Publishing. Its focus is on quality dramas, comedy and documentaries, films and sport.

TV & Satellite Week belongs to Future Publishing's family of television magazines, acquired in 2020 from TI Media, which includes rival listings magazines What's on TV and TV Times, as well as the soap bi-monthly Soaplife.

In May 2026, reflecting the shift from linear television to viewing TV and film content via connected and streaming platforms, the title of the magazine was changed after 33 years, to TV & Streaming Week. The content of the magazine was otherwise largely unchanged, with daily listings for broadcast TV channels continuing as before.
