= Robert Brown case =

Scottish man wrongly convicted for murder

Robert Brown
- Born: 1957 (age 68–69)
- Other names: Little Mad Rab (prison nickname)
- Known for: Wrongful conviction of murder

Robert Brown is a Scottish man who spent 25 years in jail for a crime he did not commit, the murder of worker Annie Walsh.

In January 1977, Annie Walsh was beaten to death in her home in Manchester. Brown signed a confession and was found guilty at trial. He maintained his innocence throughout his prison sentence even going so far as denying himself parole by not admitting to the crime. He was released on appeal in 2002.

== Background ==
On 31 January 1977, factory worker Annie Walsh, who was 51 at the time, was found battered to death in her flat in Charles Barry Crescent, Hulme, Greater Manchester by a man who had come to read the electricity meter. She had been hit over the head sixteen times and her blood was splattered over the furniture, walls and ceiling. A Home Office pathologist estimated that she had lain undiscovered for two to three days after the murder, (she was last seen alive on 28 January 1977). Police were so concerned about the frenzied nature of the attack that they consulted mental units in case someone had escaped.

In May 1977, the police went to the flat that Brown shared with his girlfriend Cathy; it was in the same block of flats where Annie Walsh had lived and been murdered. He was originally arrested for non-payment of a fine and was taken in for questioning without his rights being read to him and held for 32 hours without legal representation. (Note: Some sources state 36 hours.) At the trial, Brown stated that the confession was beaten and coerced out of him and when he did ask for a lawyer, he was told by the policemen that "only guilty men need a lawyer".

The trial was presided over by Judge Helenus Milmo who directed the jury's attention to the fact that it came down to whether or not they believed the police, or whether they believed Brown was innocent. The jury convicted Brown of murder and Milmo sentenced him to life with a minimum term of 15 years.

== Appeals ==
Brown appealed the sentencing in 1978, but the appeal was turned down. An appeal was lodged again with then Home Secretary, Michael Howard in 1993, but this was also denied in the following year.

Whilst in prison, Brown was caught in what Simon Hattenstone, writing in The Guardian, describes as "the Miscarriage of Justice Catch-22" (the Innocent prisoner's dilemma); because he would not admit his guilt in the crime for which he was imprisoned, he could not be rehabilitated and be deemed fit to be put in front of a parole board. Brown refused the chance of parole from a point of view that investigative journalist Eamonn O'Neill called a point of logic; "how could he be paroled for a crime that he did not commit?".

Whilst in prison, Brown shared a cell with Paul Hill, one of the Guildford Four, who, after having his conviction quashed and then released, later campaigned against Brown's miscarriage of justice. The case was again referred to the Court of Appeal in 2002 by the Criminal Cases Review Commission (CCRC).

== Release ==
An appeal court in November 2002 decided that Brown should be allowed to go free after declaring his conviction unsafe. The appeal was due to be heard over two days, but the judges at the Royal Courts of Justice in London, quashed the conviction within minutes when the Counsel for the Crown explained that he could not argue the case on the evidence presented before the court; the appeal lasted only 18 minutes before it was deemed an "unsafe conviction".

The appeal court had heard evidence that the fibres on Walsh's coat had not matched to Brown, but to another man who was questioned about the murder at the same time. This evidence was not given in court. Linguistic analysis of Brown's confession was given in evidence stating that it could not have been dictated to the police officers by Brown as the police had said. A pair of blood-soaked jeans had also been used against Brown in his interrogation with the police claiming they were the ones that Brown had used in the murder. In fact, they belonged to a woman who had suffered a miscarriage in them and the police knew this. The sight of the jeans being presented in court made Brown burst into tears as he had known the woman who had had the miscarriage in them; this was misinterpreted as guilt of the murder on his part by the people in the court.

The three judges presiding over Brown's 2002 appeal heard evidence which, in their summing up, prompted them to describe the arresting officers in Brown's case to be part of a "culture of corruption and a conspiracy to pervert the course of justice".

Detective Superintendent Peter Topping of Greater Manchester Police had written a report in the 1980s detailing corruption practices within the force during the 1970s and beyond. Despite the report containing circumstantial evidence that could have alleviated Brown's time in prison, it was not made available to his legal team until a few days before the Court of Appeal quashed his conviction because of a Public-Interest Immunity certificate concerning the report.

== Aftermath ==
Since his release, Brown has been campaigning for reforms to the legal system. He was also given compensation for his 25-year prison sentence, of which the government demanded back £100,000 for which they deemed payment for bed and board whilst he was in prison. Brown is believed to be one of the longest serving victims of a miscarriage of justice in the United Kingdom.

Cathy Shaw, Brown's girlfriend in 1977, died in 1992 at the age of 35 from alcohol poisoning. Brown and Shaw's family both attribute her death to how his conviction affected her.

It was later revealed that Brown could not take legal action against any of the police officers who were responsible for his fake confession or beatings. An investigation found "insufficient evidence" of misconduct in relation to Brown's detention, interviews or arrest. Detective Chief Inspector Jack Butler was sentenced to four years in jail after being found guilty of accepting bribes and perverting the course of justice in 1983, but that was in relation to another case not related to Robert Brown's. At Brown's Court of Appeal hearing in 2002, his defending counsel said of Butler that "not only was he involved in corruption himself but he presided over a conspiracy of corruption amongst other officers at Platt Lane police station [in Fallowfield, Manchester] between 1973 and 1979." Butler resigned from the police force in 1983.

In September 2004, the Independent Police Complaints Commission (IPCC) informed Robert Brown that there would be no prosecution of the police officers involved in his arrest and interrogation. In the same year, Channel 4 screened a documentary about Brown's case which was entitled Picking Up the Pieces. A review in The Guardian described it as "searing stuff".

In early 2005, Greater Manchester Police announced that they had reopened the investigation into Annie Walsh's murder.
