= TV easy =

British television listings magazine

- Editor: Richard Clark
- Categories: TV magazines
- Frequency: Weekly
- Circulation: 108,971 (ABC Jan – Jun 2014); Print and digital editions.
- Founded: 3 May 2005
- Final issue: 2014
- Company: IPC Media
- Country: United Kingdom
- Language: English

TV easy was a British weekly television listing magazine published in the United Kingdom by IPC Media. Its focus was on popular television, with emphasis on soap operas.

== History ==
IPC Media announced the creation of the magazine on 21 April 2005. It was created to capture a greater share of the television listings magazine sector. TV easy was designed differently to other magazines in the sector, described as compact and "handbag sized". IPC also envisioned it as a rival for Bauer Media Group's publication TV Choice, with its entry price being at the lower end of the market. IPC Media allocated a ten million pounds marketing campaign to aid the launch into the sector. IPC Media, also owned the sector's best selling listings magazine, What's on TV. IPC Media wanted to disrupt the market which they believed had become stagnant at five million readers for years. A publicist from the brand stated that the launch of TV easy was a tactic in "reinvigorating and growing" the sector. It was designed to be different than What's on TV by its compact size and a unique easy-to-use index. The magazines actual size was not publicised in advance and only revealed on the launch day. It was decided that TV easy would focus on what the brand believed readers would be most interested in reading. The opted to leave out comprehensive film reviews and full-page features, offering a simple preview of the week's television. TV easy's target circulation was 350,000 copies sold within 12 months of its launch.

IPC chief executive Sylvia Auton stated that it was delivering on a promise to grow its parent company, Time Warner's ongoing commitment to growing its UK magazine business. She added "TV easy is the most comprehensively tested launch IPC has ever undertaken, and the responses have also been the highest we’ve ever recorded."

Colin Tough assumed the role of TV easy's chief editor and Richard Clark, a former editor of Webuser magazine was hired as editor. TV easy released its first issue on 3 May 2005. 1.5 million copies of the first issue were given away for free with purchases of IPC Media titles Woman, Now and Pick Me Up. Initial issues were priced at thirty pence and subsequent issues priced at thirty-five pence.

In 2010, rival television listings magazine, TV Quick was discontinued by Bauer Media Group. The publication's absence resulted in a growth in sales of the IPC titles, including TV easy.

TV easy endured a year on year sales decline from its launch. In February 2008, it was reported that TV easy was the fifth best selling television listings magazine in the UK. Though its circulation was down by 13.2 per cent during the previous period to 254,669 copies sold. For the first half of 2008, its sales fell to 231,334, which was by down 18.8 per cent and continued slumping by a further 16.6 per cent (212,419 sales) for the latter half. In the second half of 2009 its sales share fell by 14.9 per cent with 180,798 sales. For the first half of 2011, the magazine's sales dipped by 2.8 per cent to 162,145 copies sold. This made TV easy the sixth best-selling magazine from the genre. In the latter half of 2012, sales fell to 148,741, a 1.1 per cent drop. By 2013, it was the seventh best selling listings magazine, down 17.9 per cent selling just 122,116 copies in the first half year.
