= Drumry =

Area of Clydebank, Scotland

Coordinates: 55.908866°N 4.393634°W

Drumry: Scottish Gaelic: Druim Ruighe; Scots: Drumrey or Drumrye
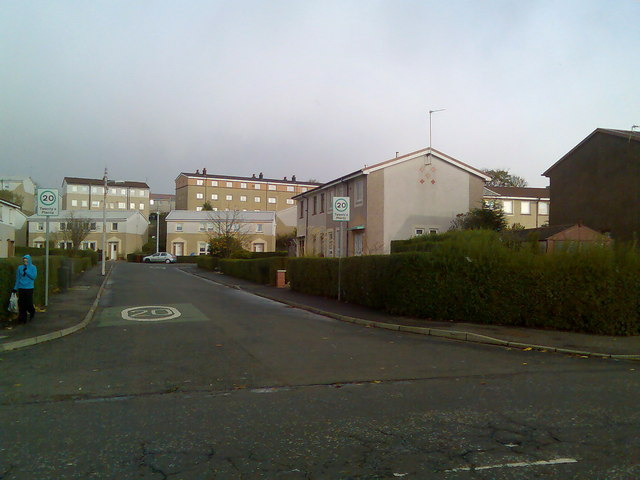
- Typical flats and small houses in Drumry

- Location within Scotland Drumry (Scotland)
- OS grid reference: NS503937
- Lieutenancy area: Dunbartonshire
- Country: Scotland
- Sovereign state: United Kingdom
- Post town: CLYDEBANK
- Postcode district: G81 2
- Dialling code: 0141
- Police: Scotland
- Fire: Scottish
- Ambulance: Scottish
- UK Parliament: West Dunbartonshire
- Scottish Parliament: Clydebank and Milngavie

Drumry is a district in the Scottish town of Clydebank, West Dunbartonshire, split into North and South Drumry by its main thoroughfare, Drumry Road. Some of the housing, including five tower blocks, was refurbished in the early 2010s.

North Drumry is the location of one of Clydebank's two current secondary schools, St Peter the Apostle High School, built in 2009 on the site of another school, St Columba's High. Another school a short distance to the south, Braidfield High School dating from the 1950s, was demolished in 2007; the site lay unused for some years before a housing development was constructed in 2019.

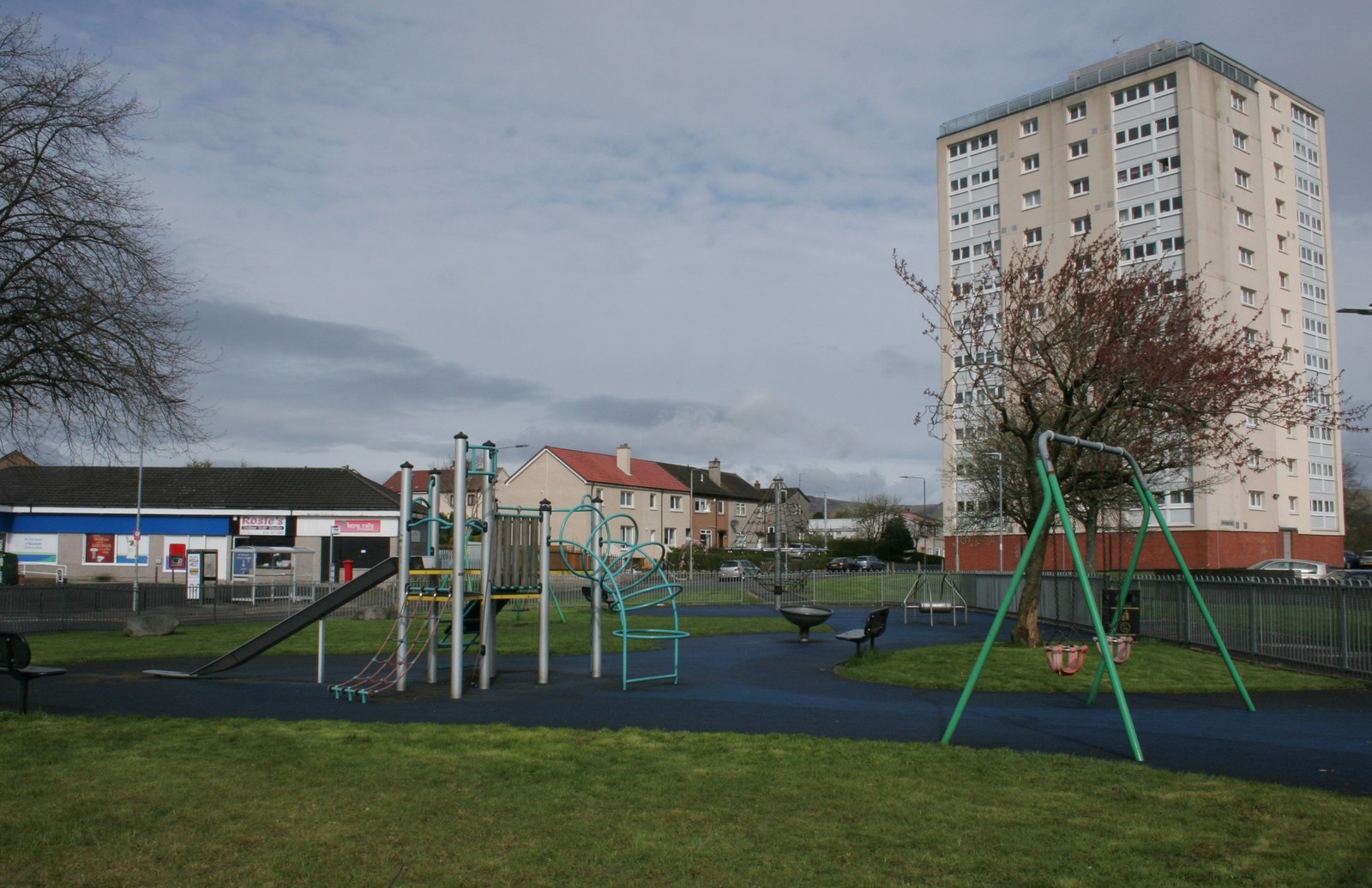
Playpark, shops and tower block on Kirkoswald Drive

To the south-east, bounded by the North Clyde Line railway, Great Western Road (A82) and the Forth and Clyde Canal, is the housing estate of Linnvale, constructed in 1950s. Drumry and Linnvale are served by Drumry railway station on the North Clyde Line which runs between Lanarkshire, Glasgow and Dumbarton. A BMX track is located next to the station on the Drumry side. These two neighbourhoods, along with other parts of Clydebank between Great Western Road to the north and the Argyle Line railway to the south, are within West Dunbartonshire's Clydebank Central ward with a combined population of 14,647 in 2011.

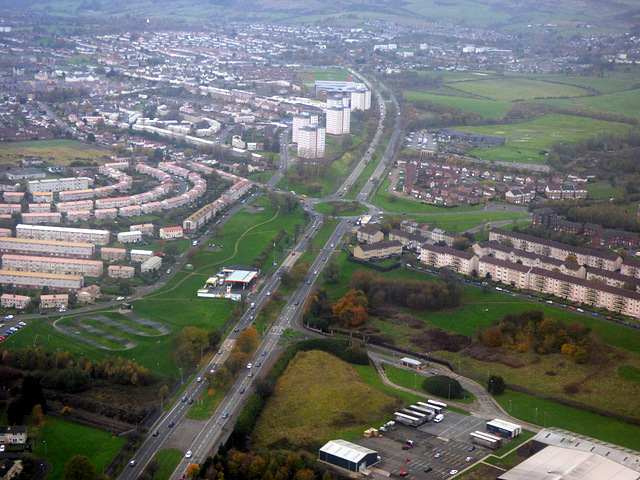
Aerial view of Great Western Road, with Drumry seen left and Drumchapel right

The central area of Clydebank (including a shopping centre and retail park) is on the other side of the railway lines to the south-west; the large Glasgow housing estate of Drumchapel is located on the other (eastern) side of Great Western Road, featuring another retail park. In 2003, 'Drumry' was named the second most deprived area in Scotland by the Scottish Executive, however this referred to the Drumry ward of Glasgow City Council's area, i.e. the western part of Drumchapel rather than the Clydebank neighbourhood. The physical division between the communities has historically been a 'hot spot' for territorial gang violence.
