= Pick Me Up (magazine) =

British weekly women's magazine

Pick Me Up!
- Cover of 12 September 2024 issue
- Editor: Matt Davies
- Categories: Women's magazine
- Frequency: Weekly
- Circulation: 183,662 (ABC Jul – Dec 2013); Print and digital editions.
- First issue: January 2005
- Company: Future plc
- Country: United Kingdom
- Based in: London
- Language: English

Pick Me Up! is a British weekly women's magazine that is published through the Future plc group.

It "leapt" into the ten most popular weekly women's magazines in just six months, selling more than half a million copies.

== Editor ==
June Smith-Sheppard was appointed editor of Pick Me Up for its launch in 2005. The Guardian referred to her as an "uncompromisingly ordinary launch editor, [that] offers a tantalising glimpse of the tongue-in-cheek items she hopes will define the new women's weekly.

== Columnists ==
- Jeremy Kyle: Jeremy wrote an agony uncle column for Pick Me Up, until September 2010, in the style of the talk show he presents, The Jeremy Kyle Show.
- Claire Petulengro: horoscope.
- Dr Nicola Davies: Nicola is the investigative psychologist for the 'Making of a monster' column. This studies the psychological influences causing specific people to become notorious killers.
- GP Doctor Gary Bartlett is a regular contributor to writing the Instant Appointment column.
- Eleanor Winmour is a non-regular opinion columnist on a range of different topics
