= Isabella Lappin =

Early 20th century Scottish female politician

Isabella (Bella) Lappin (1880-1961) was a political activist and local councillor in Clydebank, Scotland, associated with Red Clydeside and one of its leading figures, Davie Kirkwood. In 1919 she was one of a small number of women in Scotland who stood as candidates in the first municipal elections held in 1919 after the extension of the franchise arising from the Representation of the People Act 1918. Not as well known as her contemporary and colleague Jane Rae, she did however have a longer and more extensive career.

== Early life ==
Born in 1880 on the southside of Glasgow, Bella Williams, met and married her husband, William in Clydebank; both gave addresses a few doors down from each other in Trafalgar Street, Dalmuir. Bella worked in a fishmonger, William as a grocer for the Co-operative. They married in St Stephen’s, Dalmuir in September 1909.

== Activism ==
Lappin was elected as an Independent Labour Councillor to Clydebank Burgh Council in 1919. For the next thirty or more years she was involved in politics, locally and nationally. She served as a member of the Executive of the Scottish Labour Party, was a leader in the Women's Guild of the Co-operative movement, served on the local government Education Committee and on the local executive branch of the National Health Service. During the period of the Rent Strike she was Treasurer of the local branch of the Scottish Labour Housing Associations.

A 1925 correspondent to The Suffragist wrote to correct the record that Glasgow had appointed the first women Ballies in Scotland. At that time two out of five Baillies in Clydebank, were women: Jane Rae and Bella Lappin.

In 1935 Bella was reported to be the only female councillor on Clydebank Town Council

In celebrations marking Red Clydesider David Kirkwood's 25 years as an MP in 1948, 400 people gathered in Clydebank Town Hall. Among the speeches of congratulations, Bella Lappin was the only woman speaker since she had been among the first to propose Kirkwood as a parliamentary candidate in 1918.

== Later life ==
In 1951, now aged 70, Bella was a key speaker at an 'eve of poll' Labour Party rally supporting the Labour candidate Mr Bence against a novice Conservative candidate William Whitelaw.

Bella died in January 1961 and is buried in Clydebank.
