= James Miller (architect) =

Scottish architect & artist (1860–1947)

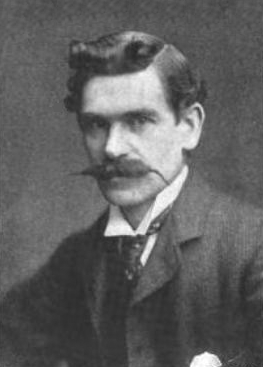
- In The Sketch, 8 May 1901
- Born: 1860; Auchtergaven, Perthshire
- Died: 28 November 1947 (aged 87); Stirling
- Occupation: Architect
- Buildings: Glasgow Central railway station Wemyss Bay railway station One Great George Street

James Miller FRSE FRIBA FRIAS RSA (1860–1947) was a Scottish architect, recognised for his commercial architecture in Glasgow and for his Scottish railway stations. Notable among these are the American-influenced Union Bank building at 110–20 St Vincent Street, while acknowledging Richard McLoud Morrison Gunn as the bank's chief designer; his 1901–1905 extensions to Glasgow Central railway station; and Wemyss Bay railway station on the Firth of Clyde. His lengthy career resulted in a wide range of building types, and, with the assistance of skilled draughtsmen such as Richard M Gunn, he adapted his designs to changing tastes and new architectural materials and technologies.

== Early life ==
Miller was the son of a farmer, and was born in Auchtergaven, Perthshire, in 1860. He spent most of his childhood in Little Cairnie, Forteviot, and was educated at Perth Academy.

In 1877, he was articled to the Perth architect Andrew Heiton, and on completion of his apprenticeship, he worked in Edinburgh at the office of Hippolyte Blanc before joining the engineering department of the Caledonian Railway, initially in Perth.

== Career ==
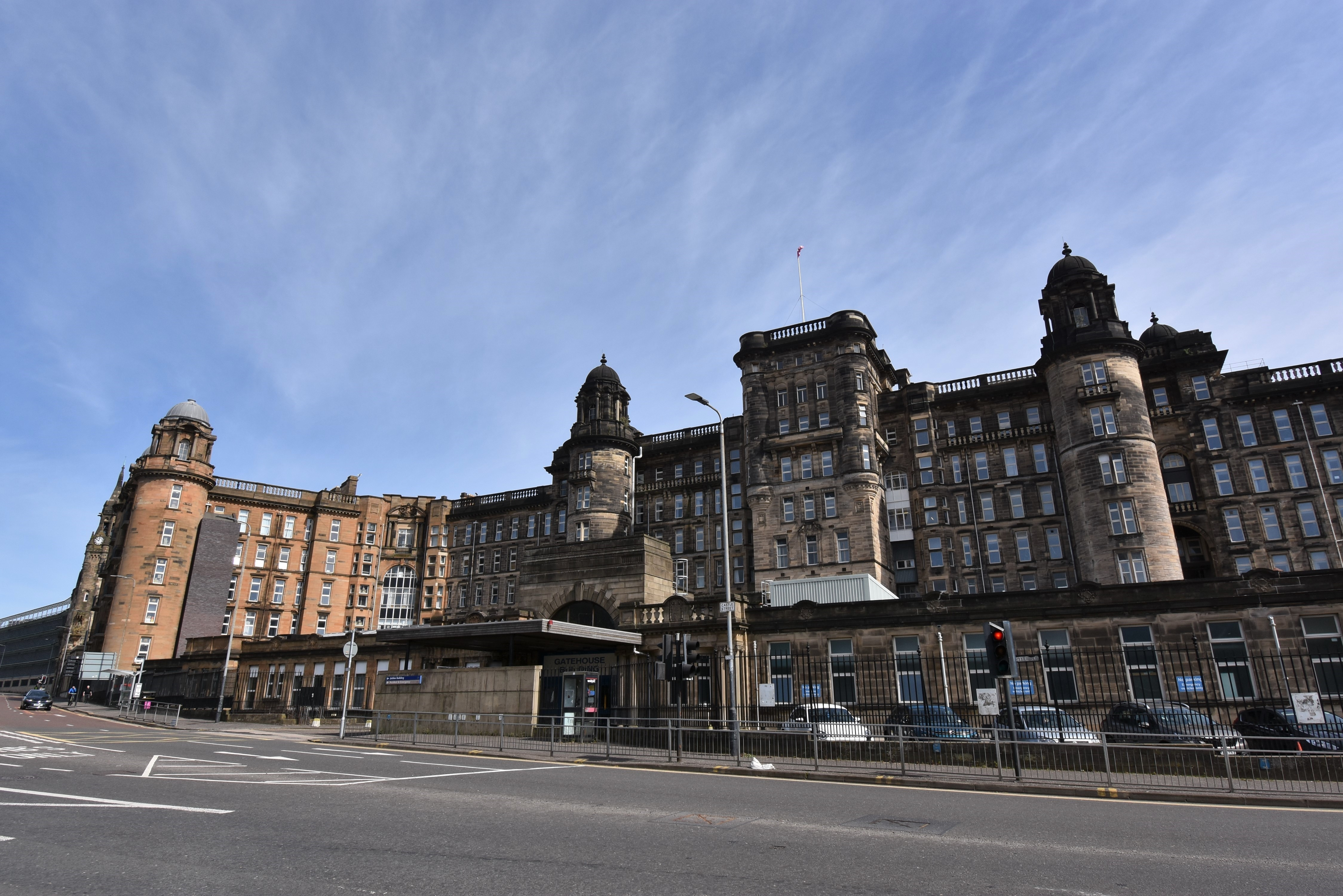
Glasgow Royal Infirmary 1905-1915

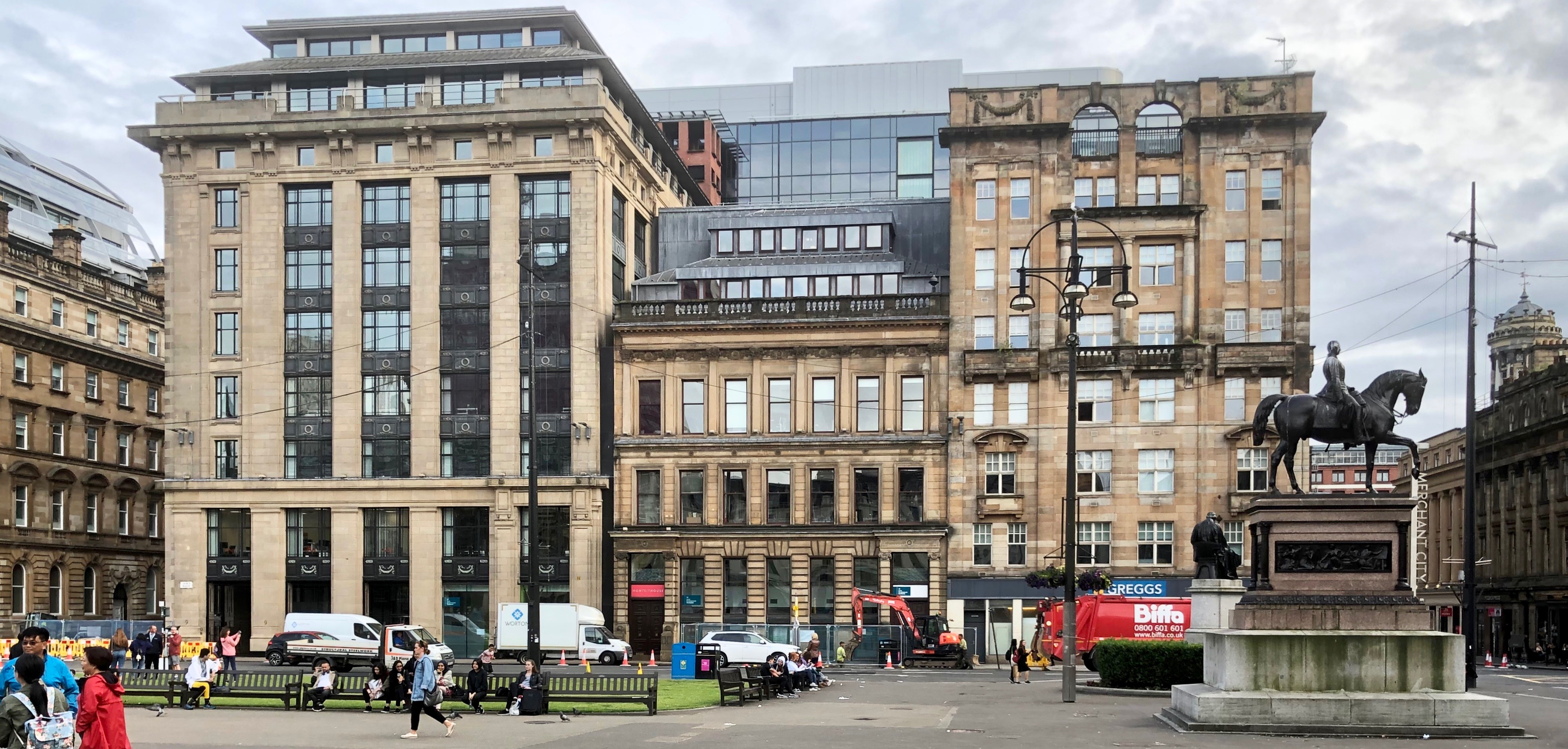
In George Square, the McLaren warehouse (1922) and Olympic House (1903) frame an earlier office by James Burnett.

In 1888, Miller was transferred to the Caledonian Railway's drawing office in Glasgow, and designed a number of railway stations in the West of Scotland under the supervision of the engineer-in-chief, George Graham, and Donald Alexander Matheson, who was to become his successor. Notable designs from this period include the English-domestic style stations at Fort Matilda (1889), Troon (1892) and West Kilbride (1900), and the interchanges between rail and steamer at Gourock Pier (1889) and Greenock Princes Pier (1893). In 1892, having won the competition to design Belmont Church in Hillhead, he set up in full-time practice on his own account and rented an office at 223 West George Street, Glasgow.

His experience of railway work brought commissions in 1894 from his prior employer Caledonian Railway for 'chalet-style' stations on the West Highland Line. In 1901, his designs were followed during construction of the Mallaig Extension Railway by Sir Robert McAlpine using mass concrete.

He also designed the Scottish Jacobean-style St Enoch subway station for the Glasgow District Subway Company and two major railway hotels,Turnberry Hotel and Gleneagles Hotel.

During the following 40 years, he won competitions and commissions for a wide variety of buildings including for the 1901 Glasgow International Exhibition, of which his Sunlight Cottages are the sole remains; in 1901 for the Glasgow Royal Infirmary, which resulted in a bulky and unpopular baronial-style design; and in 1904 for the Glasgow & South Western Railway's Turnberry Hotel. He undertook significant work for the Caledonian Railway at this time, including extensions to Glasgow Central Station and its hotel (1900–1905), Wemyss Bay railway station (1903), with its circular booking office and curving timber walkway to the steamer pier, and Stirling railway station (1915), also with circular elements. He designed the Govan memorial church to Margaret Macgregor.

In 1910, he won the competition to design the headquarters of the Institution of Civil Engineers at One Great George Street in London's Westminster, together with the adjacent matching extension to the Institution of Mechanical Engineers, which were built of Portland stone in a neo-Baroque style.

An American influence began to appear in Miller's work following a 1902 fact-finding visit to the USA by Matheson. An early example was Olympic House (1903), a plain rectangular speculative office development in Glasgow's Queen Street, followed by the Anchor Line Building (1905–07) on St Vincent Place. The façade of this building is of white faience tiles, the first time that a Scottish architect had used this material. It developed further following the appointment in 1918 of Richard M Gunn as chief draughtsman and designer, which resulted in designs such as the McLaren warehouse (1922) in George Square, and the massive classical Head Office for the Union Bank of Scotland (1924) in St Vincent Street. Under the guidance and advice from Eugène Bourdon, (1870-1916) a brilliant French architect and Professor at the Glasgow School of Art, Gunn also travelled to the US, where he spent time studying US architecture in a New York office, 1910.

Miller's later commercial architecture during the 1930s featured hints of Egyptian revival decoration and Art Deco, as seen in the Commercial Bank of Scotland (1930–1) at the corner of Glasgow's West Nile and West George streets; and the last of his bank buildings, also for the Commercial Bank of Scotland, at 30 Bothwell Street (1934–35). Both these buildings used white Portland Stone to combat the effects of Glasgow's polluted atmosphere at the time.

Major commissions beyond Scotland included Wyggeston Grammar School for Boys (1927) in Leicester, and the neo-Georgian style Dining Hall and 'Cocoa Block' (1929) for Cadbury at Bournville. His final designs were for long, low buildings such as the Glasgow & West of Scotland College of Commerce (1933) in Pitt Street, Glasgow.

Miller's domestic work spanned his architectural career. Much of his early work, such as "Dunloskin", Dumbreck (1890), and Craighuchty Terrace, Aberfoyle (c. 1890) is in an English Arts & Crafts style and influenced by his railway architecture. Further commissions for houses in Glasgow followed as a result of Miller's involvement in the 1901 Glasgow International Exhibition, including 8 and 10 Lowther Terrace, Great Western Road (1904 and 1910 respectively). Between 1915 and 1923, he designed "Kildonan", near Barrhill, Ayrshire, for Captain David Euan Wallace MP, a very large property similar in size to Turnberry Hotel, and in a Tudor Revival style.

In 1937 he was elected a Fellow of the Royal Society of Edinburgh. His proposers were Magnus Mowat, Sir Thomas Hudson Beare, Sir Thomas Henry Holland, John Barber Todd and Sir Alexander Gibb.

Miller died on 28 November 1947 at Randolphfield, Stirling, which had been his home since 1911.

== Family ==
He was married to Emilina Henrietta Crichton.

They had three children. Muriel (1901-1999) George (1903-1940) and Mabel (1904-2001) His son George James Miller joined the architectural practice in the mid-1930s but died in 1940, at which point James retired.

== Gallery ==
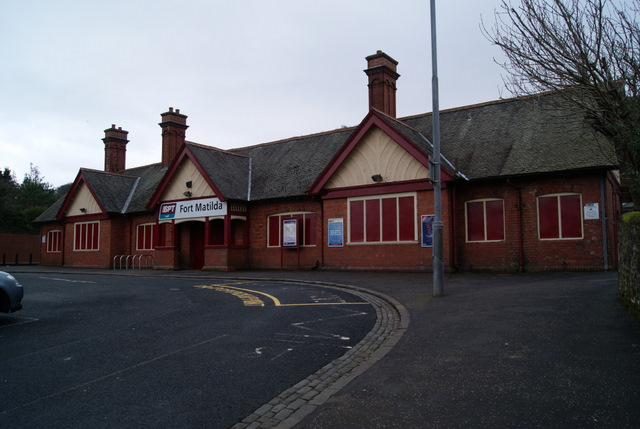
Fort Matilda railway station (1889)

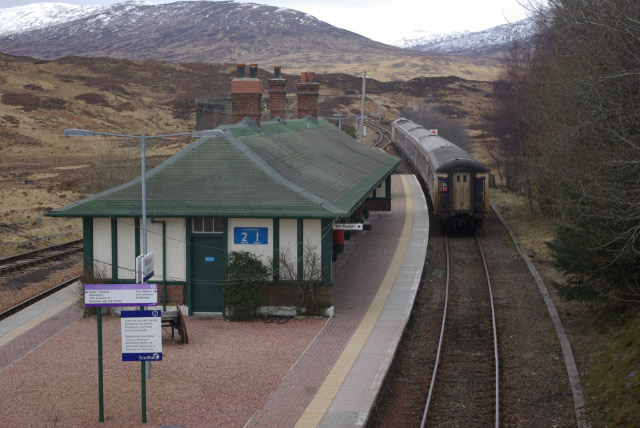
Rannoch railway station (1894)

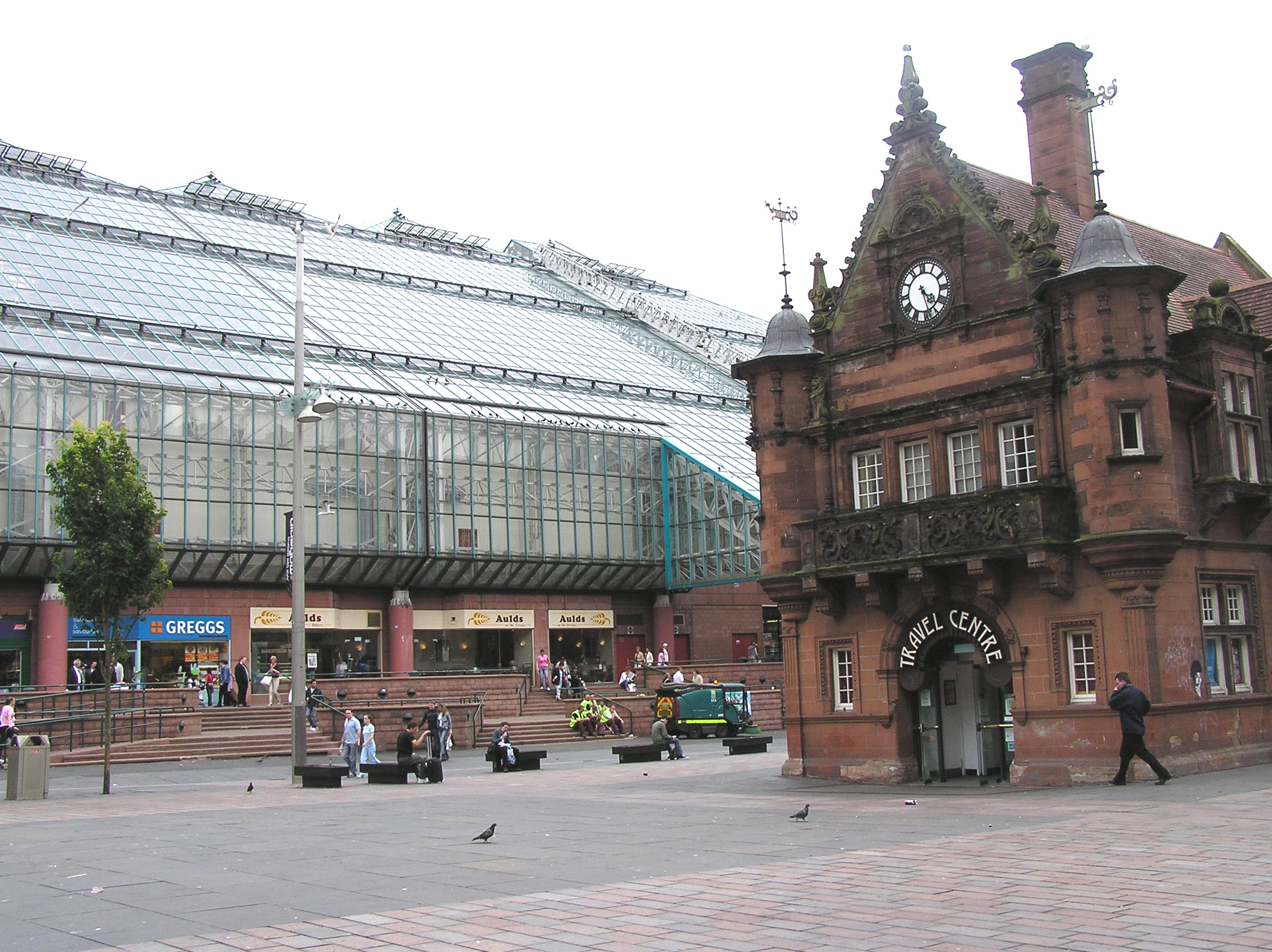
St. Enoch subway station (1896)

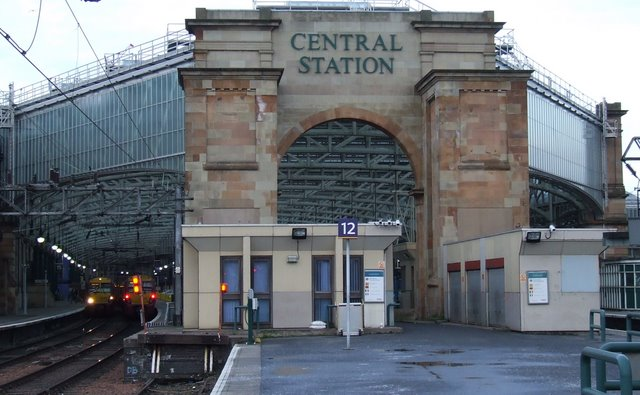
Glasgow Central station (1899-1906)

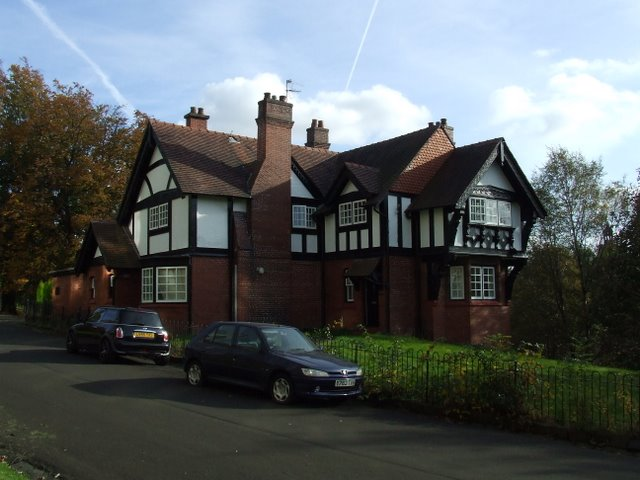
Sunlight Cottages (1901)

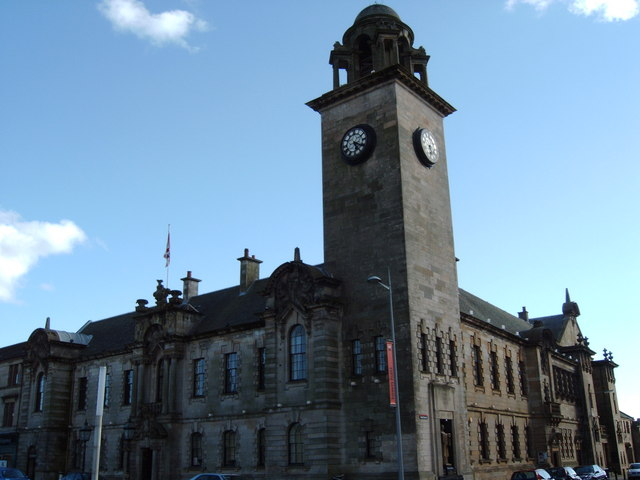
Clydebank Town Hall and Public Library (1902)

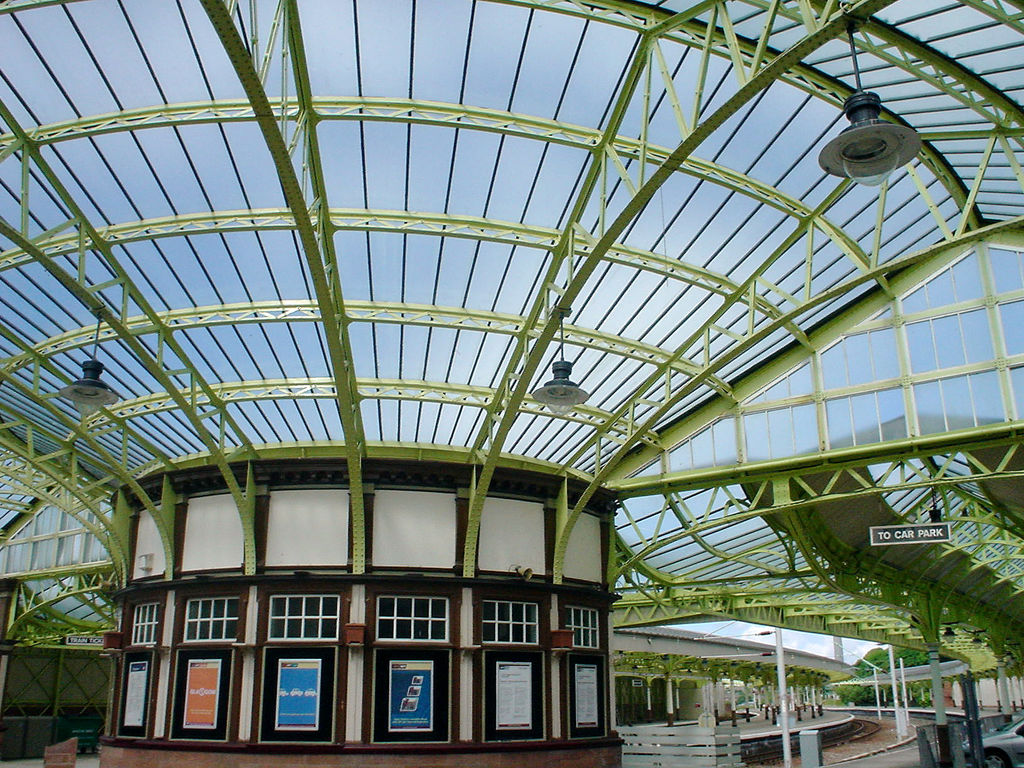
Wemyss Bay railway station (1903)

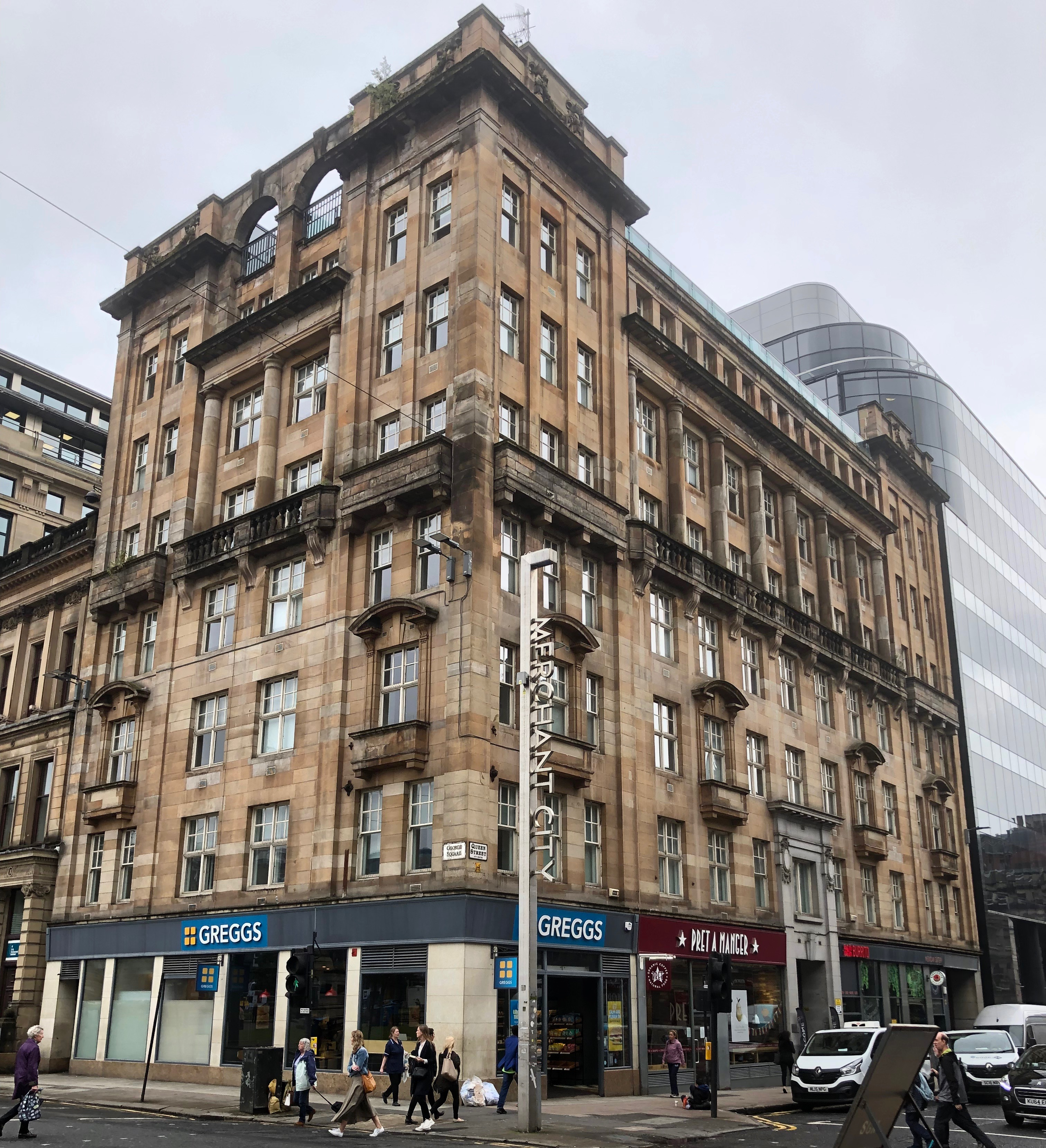
Olympic House on the corner between George Square and Queen Street, Glasgow (1903)

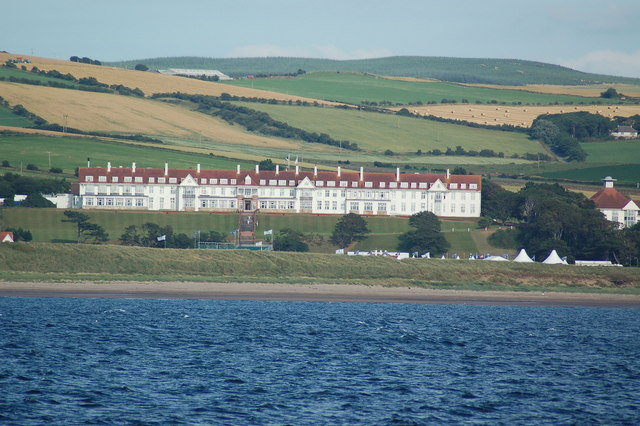
Turnberry Hotel (1904)

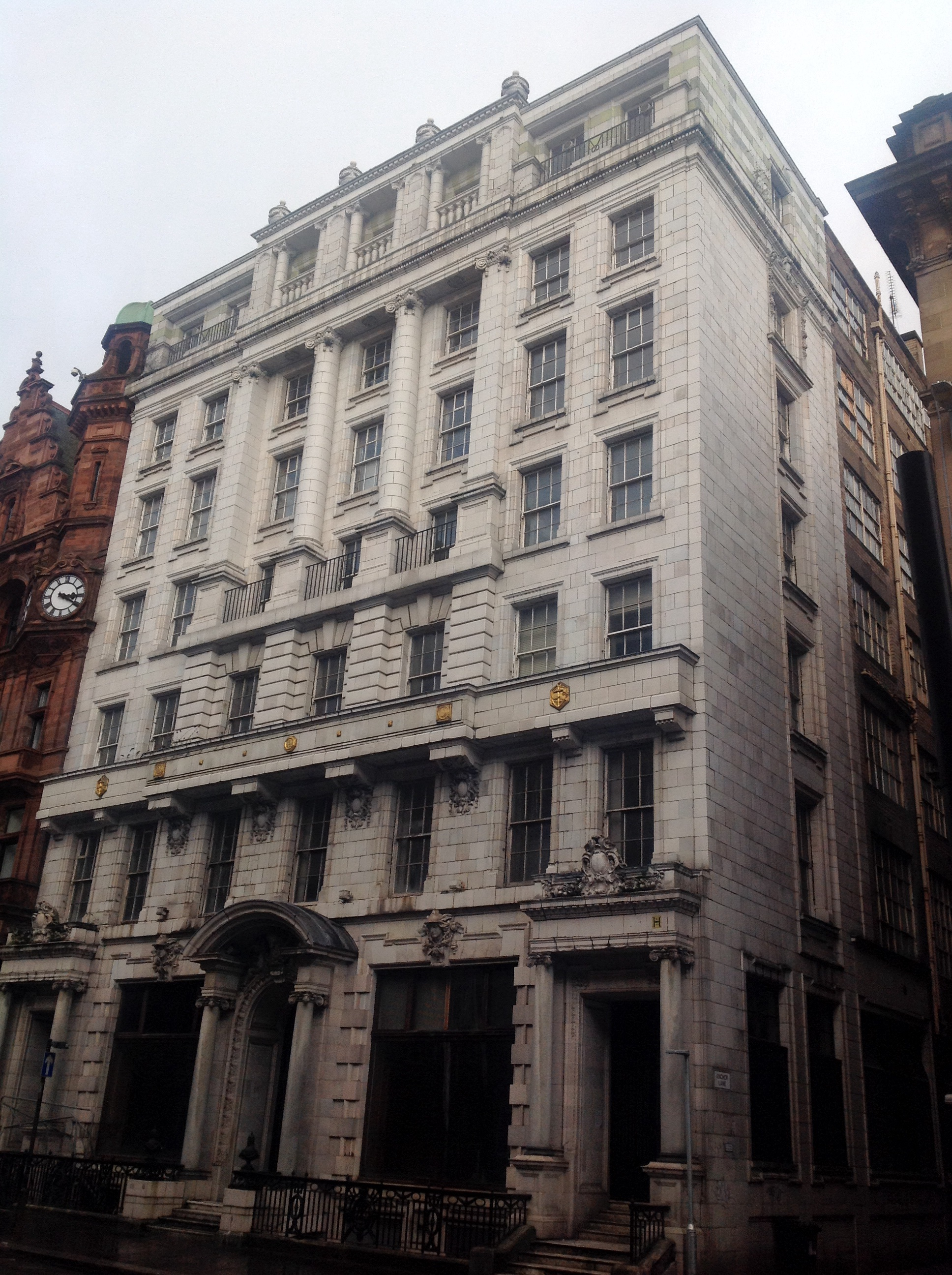
Anchor Line building, Glasgow (1905–07)

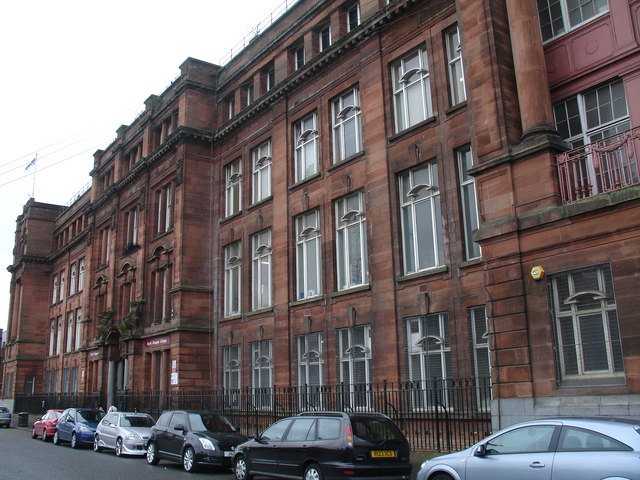
Headquarters of the North British Locomotive Company in Springburn (1909)

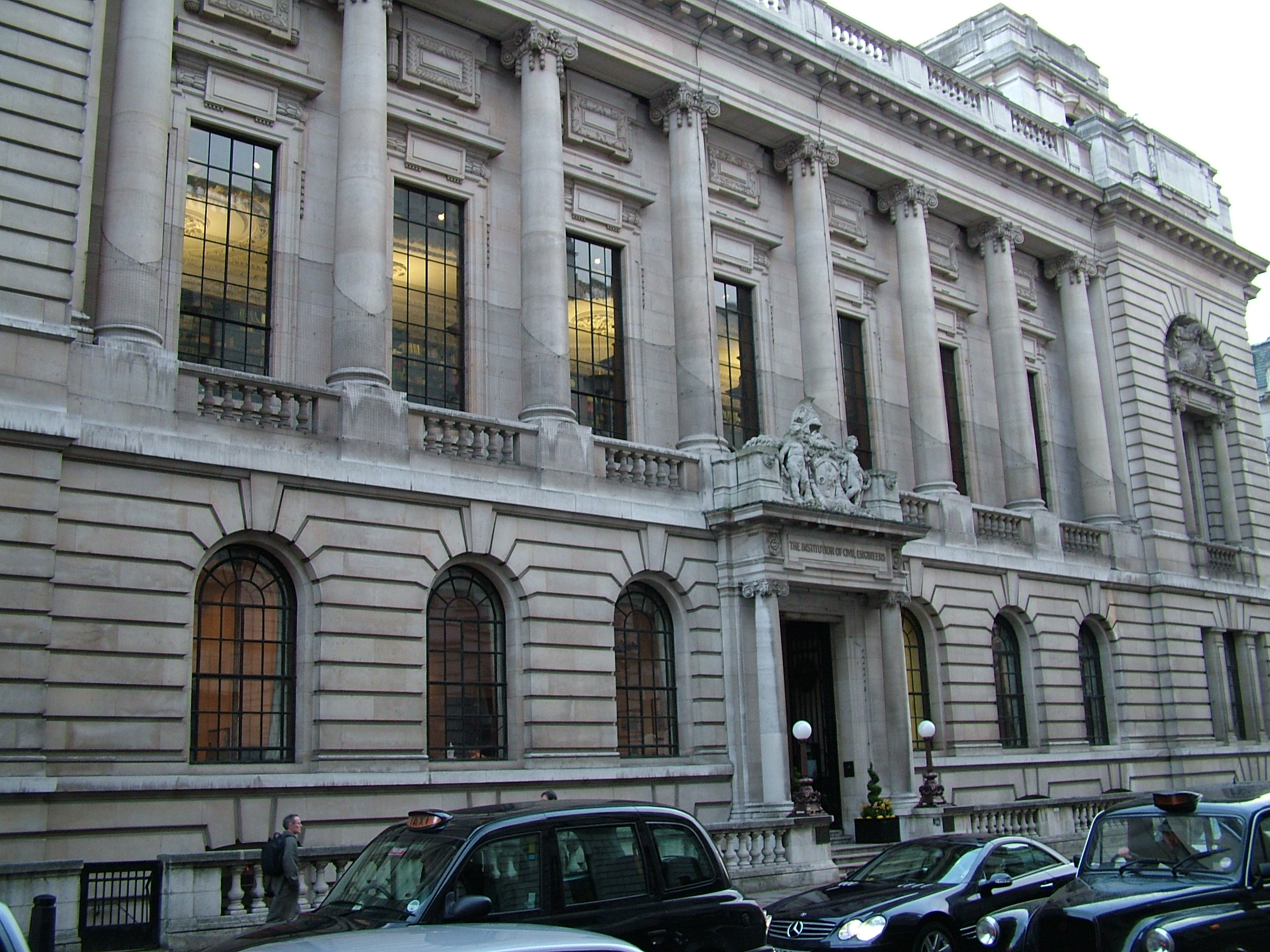
Institution of Civil Engineers, One Great George Street, London (1910)

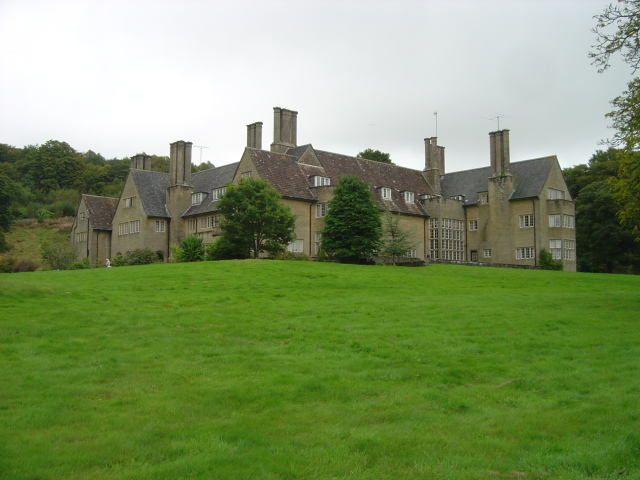
"Kildonan", Barrhill, Ayrshire (1915-1923)

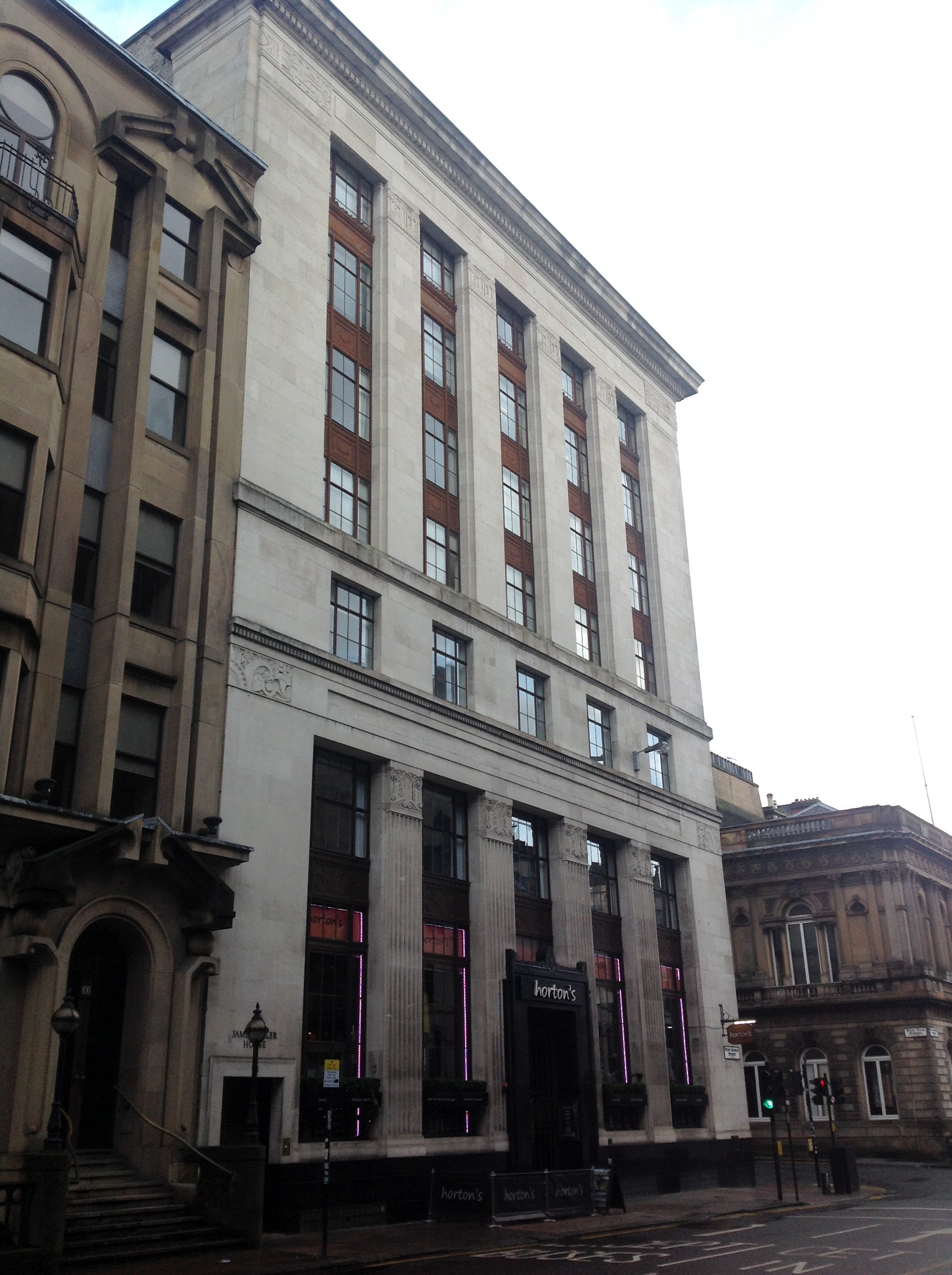
Commercial Bank of Scotland, Glasgow (1930-1)

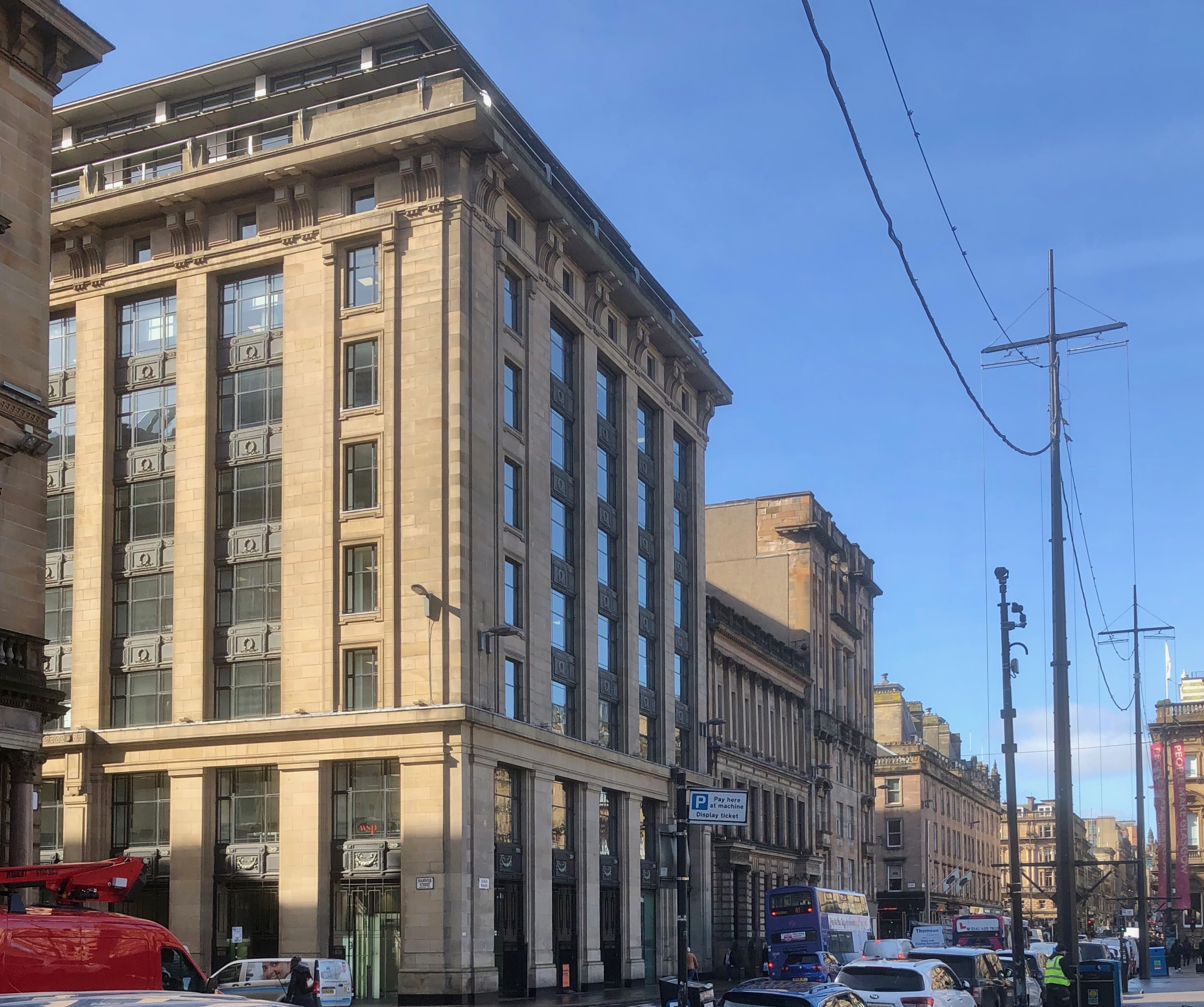
McLaren warehouse, George Square, Glasgow (1923)

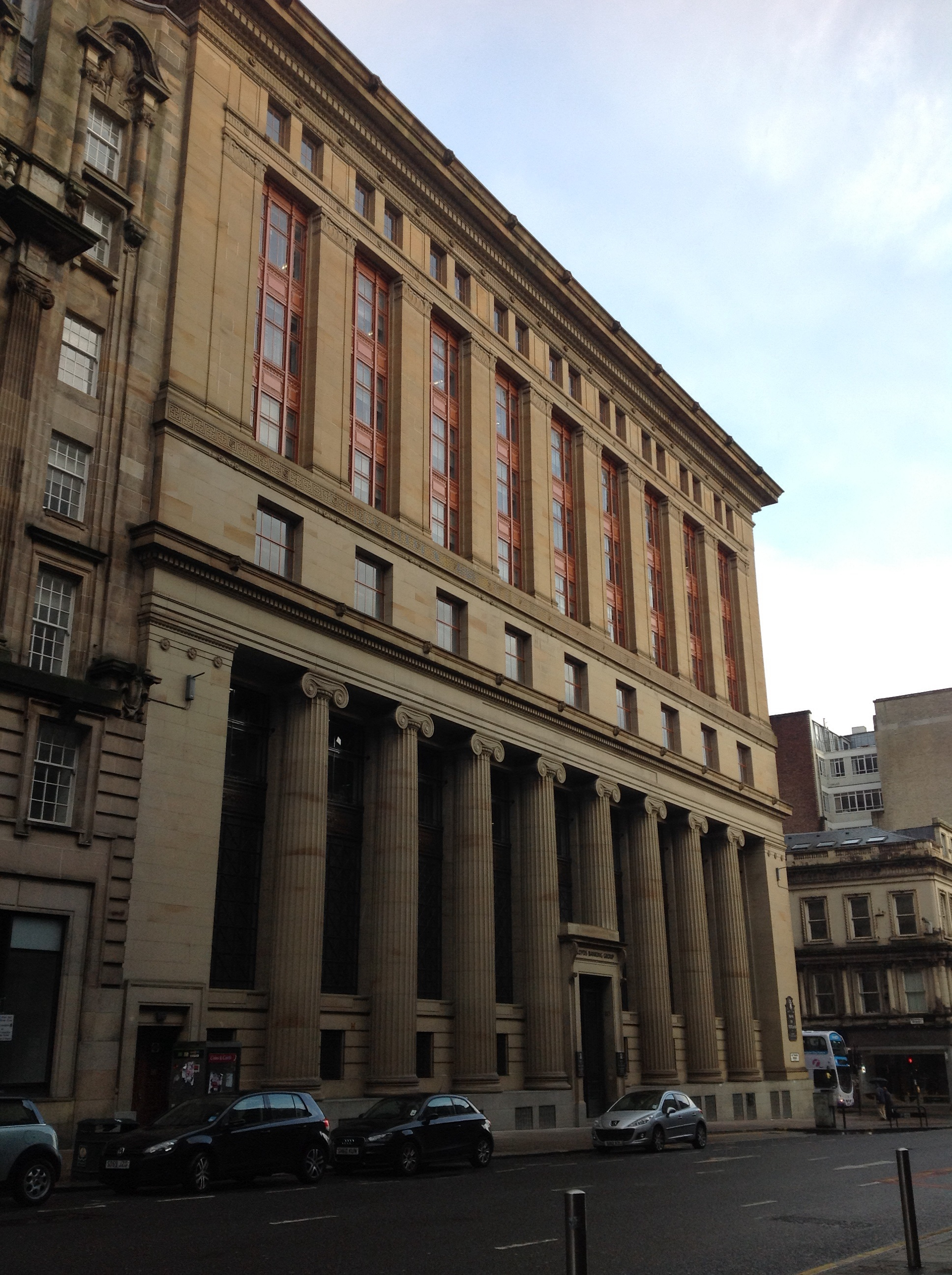
Union Bank of Scotland, Glasgow (1924)

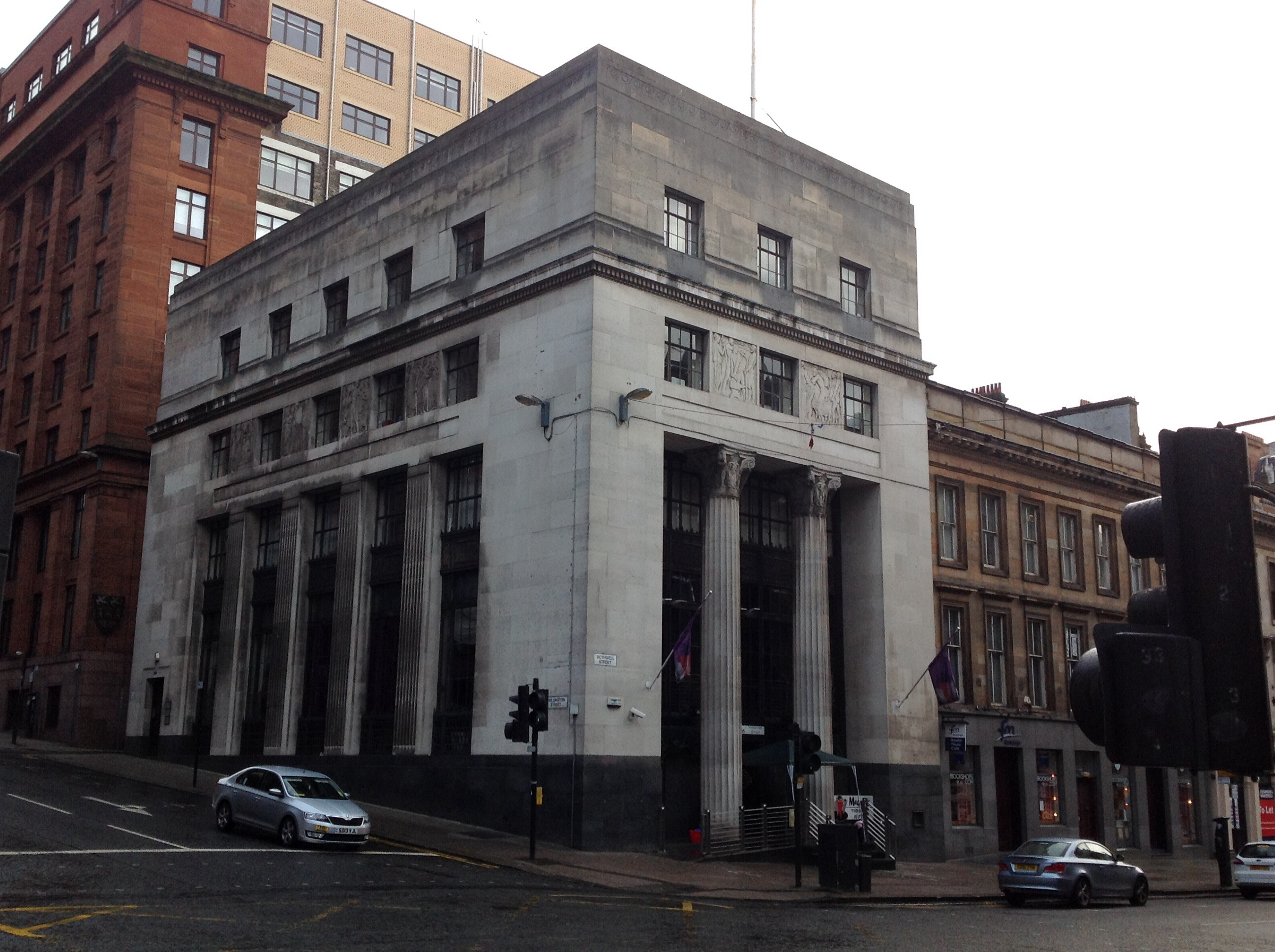
Commercial Bank of Scotland, Glasgow (1934–35)

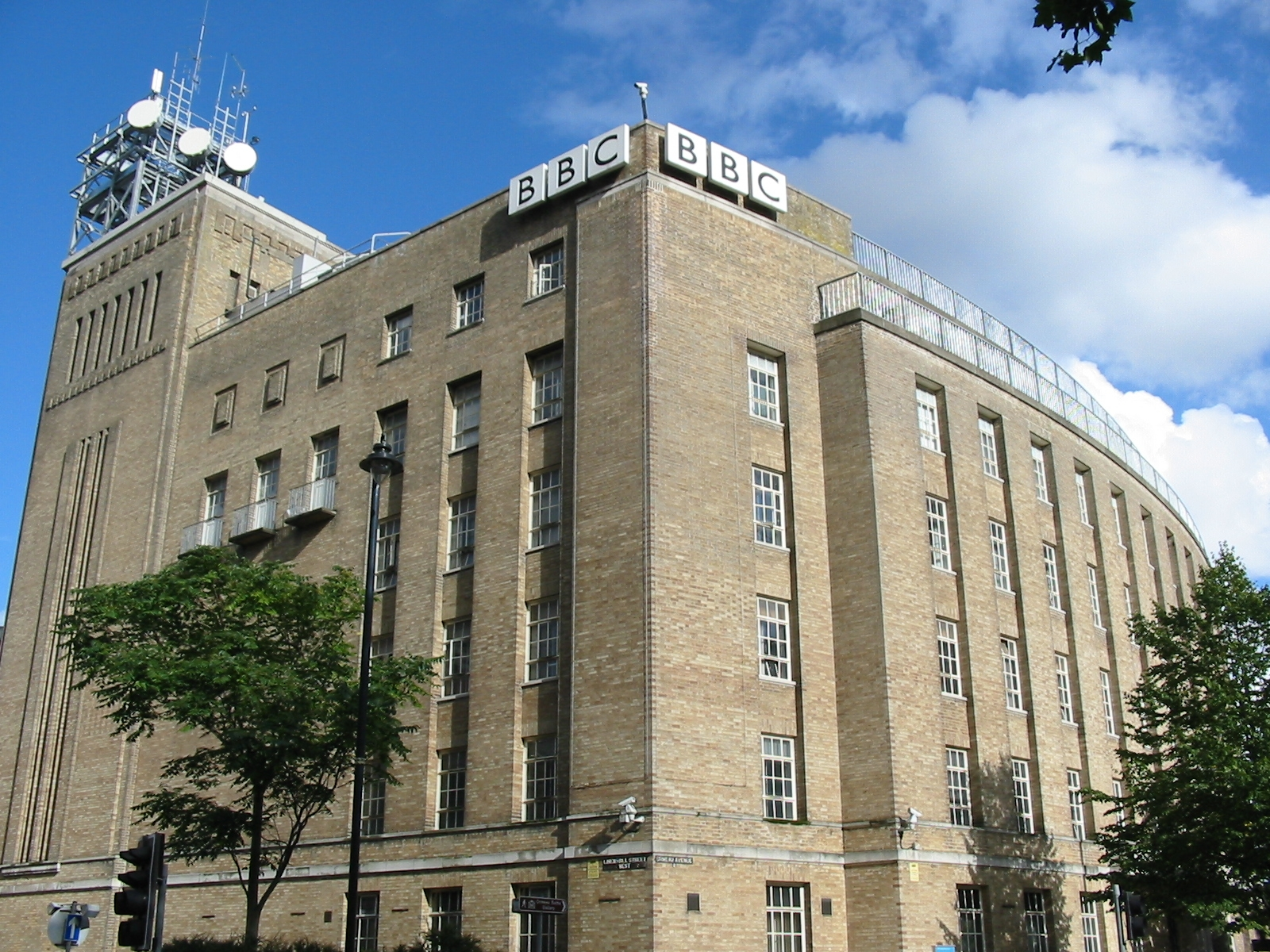
BBC Broadcasting House, Belfast (1936)
