= Millwall Dock =

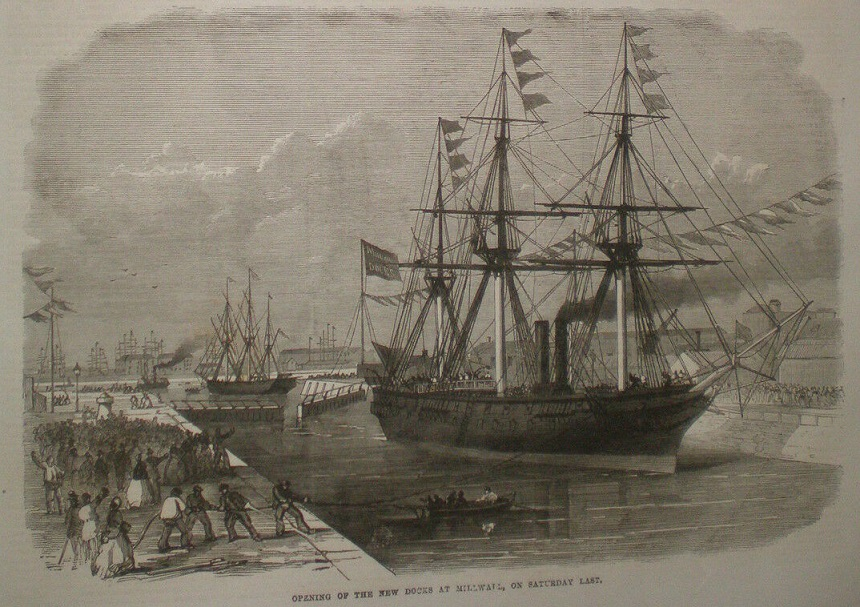
- Opening of new docks at Millwall in 1868

- Location within London Borough of Tower Hamlets
- 51°29′43.37″N 0°0′58″W
- Location: London

History
- Built: 1802
- Built for: Built speculatively by John Kelk and John Aird & Co.

Site notes
- Architect: Sir John Fowler

Millwall Dock is a dock at Millwall, London, England, located south of Canary Wharf on the Isle of Dogs.

== History ==
Millwall Canal, Wharfs and Graving Docks Act 1864 (Note: Section 1.)
- Act of Parliament
- Parliament of the United Kingdom
- Long title: An Act for incorporating "The Millwall Canal Company," and for authorizing them to make and maintain Canals and other Works in the Isle of Dogs, and thereby, and by the Appropriation of Works and Lands there, to provide Accommodation for Shipping and Waterside Accommodation for Shipbuilding and other Businesses requiring Water Frontage; and for other Purposes.
- Citation: 27 & 28 Vict. c. cclv
- Territorial extent: United Kingdom

Dates
- Royal assent: 25 July 1864
- Commencement: 25 July 1864 (Note: The Acts of Parliament (Commencement) Act 1793.)
- Repealed: 23 December 1920
Other legislation
Amended by	Millwall Dock Act 1870; Millwall Dock Act 1887
Repealed by	Port of London (Consolidation) Act 1920

Status: Repealed

Text of statute as originally enacted

Millwall Canal Act 1866
- Act of Parliament
- Parliament of the United Kingdom
- Long title: An Act to authorize the Millwall Canal Company to raise more Money.
- Citation: 29 & 30 Vict. c. cccxxiii
- Territorial extent: United Kingdom

Dates
- Royal assent: 6 August 1866
- Commencement: 6 August 1866
- Repealed: 23 December 1920
Other legislation
Amended by	Millwall Dock Act 1870
Repealed by	Port of London (Consolidation) Act 1920

Status: Repealed

Millwall Dock Act 1870
- Act of Parliament
- Parliament of the United Kingdom
- Long title: An Act to amend and extend the Acts relating to the Millwall Canal Company, to change the name of the Company; and for other purposes.
- Citation: 33 & 34 Vict. c. xx
- Territorial extent: United Kingdom

Dates
- Royal assent: 12 May 1870
- Commencement: 12 May 1870
- Repealed: 23 December 1920
Other legislation
Amends	Millwall Canal Act 1866
Repealed by	Port of London (Consolidation) Act 1920

Status: Repealed

Text of statute as originally enacted

Millwall Dock Act 1879
- Act of Parliament
- Parliament of the United Kingdom
- Long title: An Act for conferring further powers on the Millwall Dock Company, and to authorise certain agreements between them and other Dock Companies; and for other purposes.
- Citation: 42 & 43 Vict. c. lxvii
- Territorial extent: United Kingdom

Dates
- Royal assent: 3 July 1879
- Expired: 3 July 1879
- Repealed: 23 December 1920
Other legislation
Amended by	Millwall Dock Act 1887; Millwall Dock Act 1896
Repealed by	Port of London (Consolidation) Act 1920

Status: Repealed

Text of statute as originally enacted

Millwall Dock Act 1882
- Act of Parliament
- Parliament of the United Kingdom
- Long title: An Act for conferring further powers on the Millwall Dock Company and for other purposes.
- Citation: 45 & 46 Vict. c. xxxvi
- Territorial extent: United Kingdom

Dates
- Royal assent: 19 June 1882
- Commencement: 19 June 1882
- Repealed: 23 December 1920
Other legislation
Repealed by	Port of London (Consolidation) Act 1920

Status: Repealed

Text of statute as originally enacted

Millwall Dock Act 1887
- Act of Parliament
- Parliament of the United Kingdom
- Long title: An Act to confer further powers upon the Millwall Dock Company; and for other purposes.
- Citation: 50 & 51 Vict. c. xxvii
- Territorial extent: United Kingdom

Dates
- Royal assent: 23 May 1887
- Commencement: 23 May 1887
- Repealed: 23 December 1920
Other legislation
Amends	Millwall Canal, Wharfs and Graving Docks Act 1864; Millwall Dock Act 1879
Repealed by	Port of London (Consolidation) Act 1920

Status: Repealed

Text of statute as originally enacted

Millwall Dock Act 1896
- Act of Parliament
- Parliament of the United Kingdom
- Long title: An Act to extend the time for the sale of superfluous lands of the Millwall Dock Company.
- Citation: 59 & 60 Vict. c. ix
- Territorial extent: United Kingdom

Dates
- Royal assent: 21 May 1896
- Commencement: 21 May 1896
- Repealed: 23 December 1920
Other legislation
Amends	Millwall Dock Act 1879
Repealed by	Port of London (Consolidation) Act 1920

Status: Repealed

Text of statute as originally enacted

Millwall Dock Act 1906
- Act of Parliament
- Parliament of the United Kingdom
- Long title: An Act to confer further powers upon the Millwall Dock Company with respect to superfluous lands.
- Citation: 6 Edw. 7. c. vii
- Territorial extent: United Kingdom

Dates
- Royal assent: 29 May 1906
- Commencement: 29 May 1906
- Repealed: 23 December 1920
Other legislation
Repealed by	Port of London (Consolidation) Act 1920

Status: Repealed

Text of statute as originally enacted

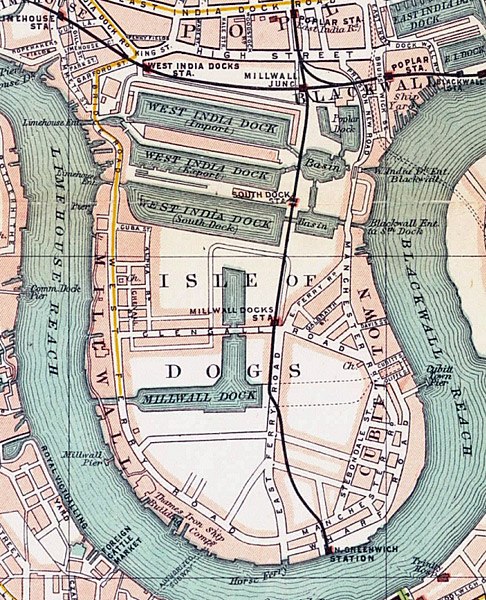
Map of the Isle of Dogs showing the docks from The Pocket Atlas and Guide to London, 1899

The dock scheme was developed speculatively by a partnership of John Kelk and John Aird & Co., who obtained the Millwall Canal, Wharfs and Graving Docks Act 1864 (27 & 28 Vict. c. cclv) incorporating the Millwall Canal Company, although the name was quickly changed to the Millwall Freehold Land and Dock Company. The engineer responsible for designing the scheme was Sir John Fowler. The construction was undertaken by Kelk and Aird and the dock was officially opened in March 1868. After a slow start to the business and financial difficulties, Kelk and Aird surrendered control of the company to lawyers acting for the investors in December 1868. In recognition of its settled status the business was renamed the Millwall Dock Company by the Millwall Dock Act 1870 (33 & 34 Vict. c. xx).

From 1897 to 1921, it was served by the Millwall Docks railway station on the Millwall Extension Railway, with goods services continuing to the 1970s.

In 1909 the Port of London Authority (PLA) took over the Millwall Dock, along with the other enclosed docks from St Katharines to Tilbury.

From 1905 Magnus Mowat worked as Engineer to the docks, being promoted to Director around 1912.

With reorganisation by the Port of London Authority in the 1920s, the northern end of the Inner Dock was connected to the West India Docks by the Millwall Passage.

The dock was used mainly for timber and grain, a trade which eventually moved down river to the Port of Tilbury with the construction of a major grain terminal in the 1960s. A McDougall's flour mill, the Wheatsheaf Mill (constructed in 1869), stood on the south side of the Outer Dock, but was demolished in about 1980. Nearby Sir John McDougall Gardens is named after one of the McDougall brothers, John McDougall, who was also a prominent local politician in Poplar.

From the 1960s onwards, the Millwall Dock experienced a steady decline – as did all of London's other docks – as the shipping industry adopted containerisation, which effectively moved traffic downstream to Tilbury. It finally closed to commercial traffic along with the Royal Docks in 1981.

The West Ferry Printing Works, the largest newspaper print works in Western Europe, was built on the north side of Outer Dock between 1984 and 1986.

The Docklands Sailing and Watersports Centre, located at the far West end of the dock where the dock previously connected to the Thames, was established by the London Docklands Development Corporation and the Sports Council at a cost of £1.2 million in 1989.

While much of the area has been occupied by commercial office towers, Millwall Dock is also an area where several housing developments and apartment towers have been developed. During the 1980s the Clippers Quay housing estate was built around the old dry dock while the Mill Quay housing development was built on the site of the old Wheatsheaf Mill.

== Layout ==
The dock is L-shaped, with an 'Outer Dock' running east–west, and an 'Inner Dock' running north from the eastern end. It originally contained around 36 acres (14 hectares) of water and had a 200-acre (81 hectare) estate. The western end of the Outer Dock was originally connected to the Thames at Millwall by an 80 ft (24 m) wide channel. The spoil from the docks formed the area of wasteland known as the Mudchute. A graving dock for ship repairs was constructed at the south-east corner of the Outer Dock (one of 6 originally planned), and later lengthened to 555 ft (169 m).

== Gallery ==
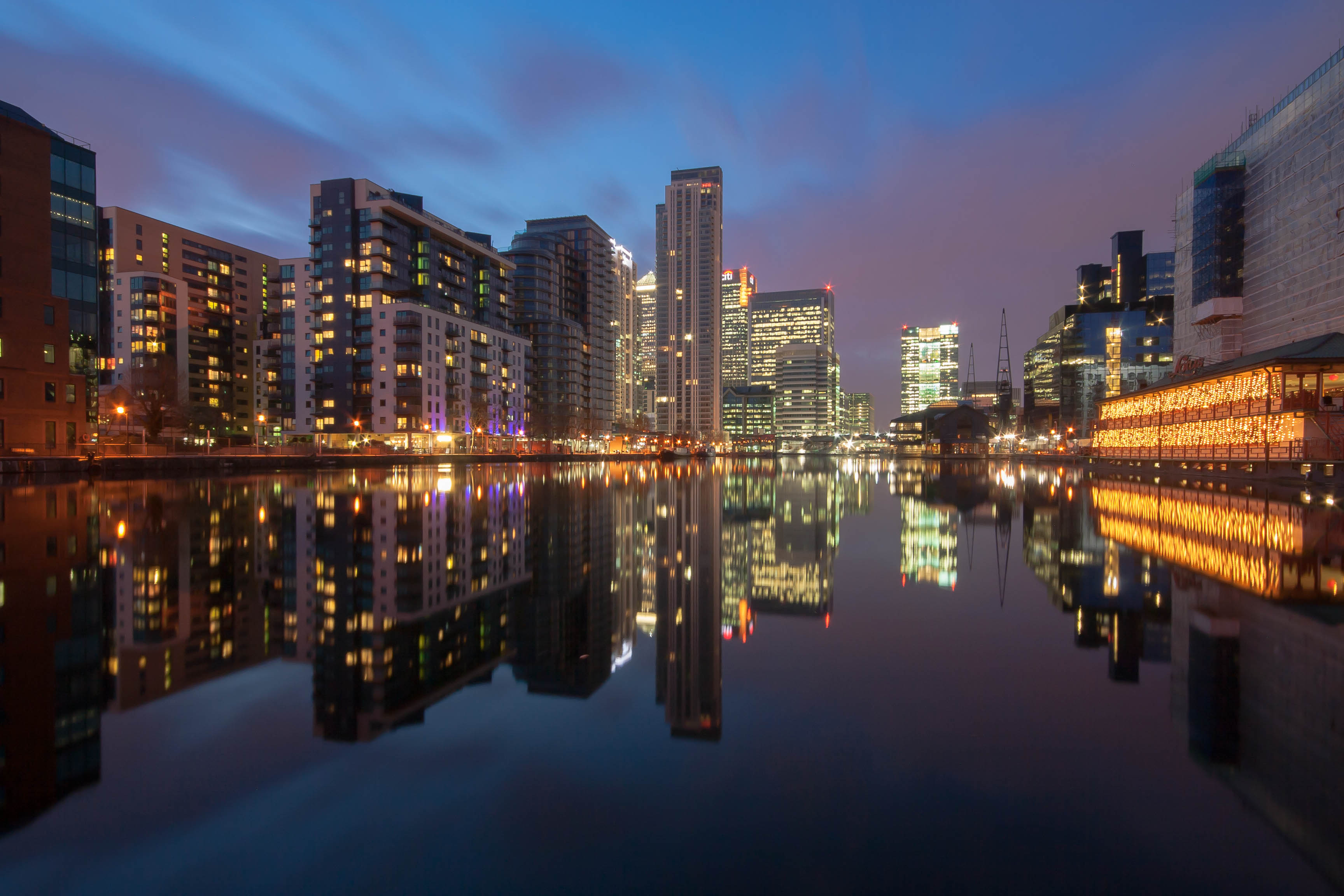
Millwall Inner Dock facing towards Canary Wharf

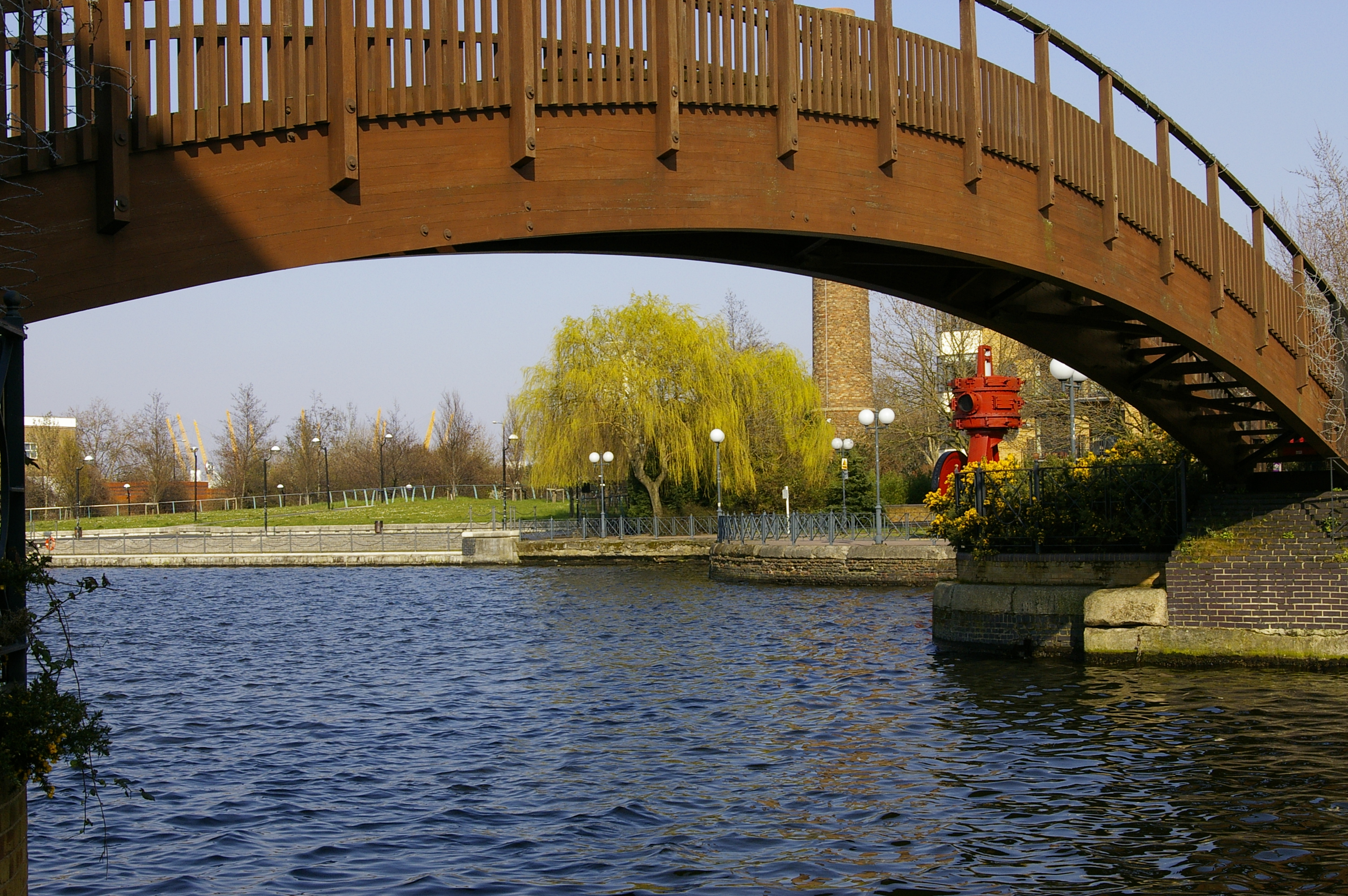
Disused timber footbridge at the entrance to the old dry dock at Clipper Quay, with an engine and a customs furnace in the background

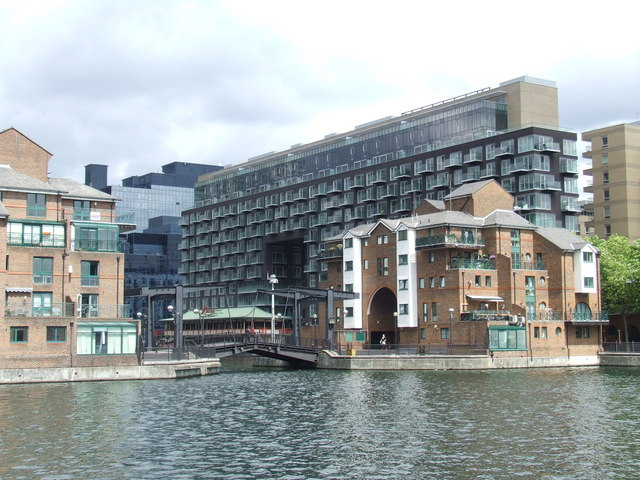
Millwall Dock and Glengall Bridge, June 2011

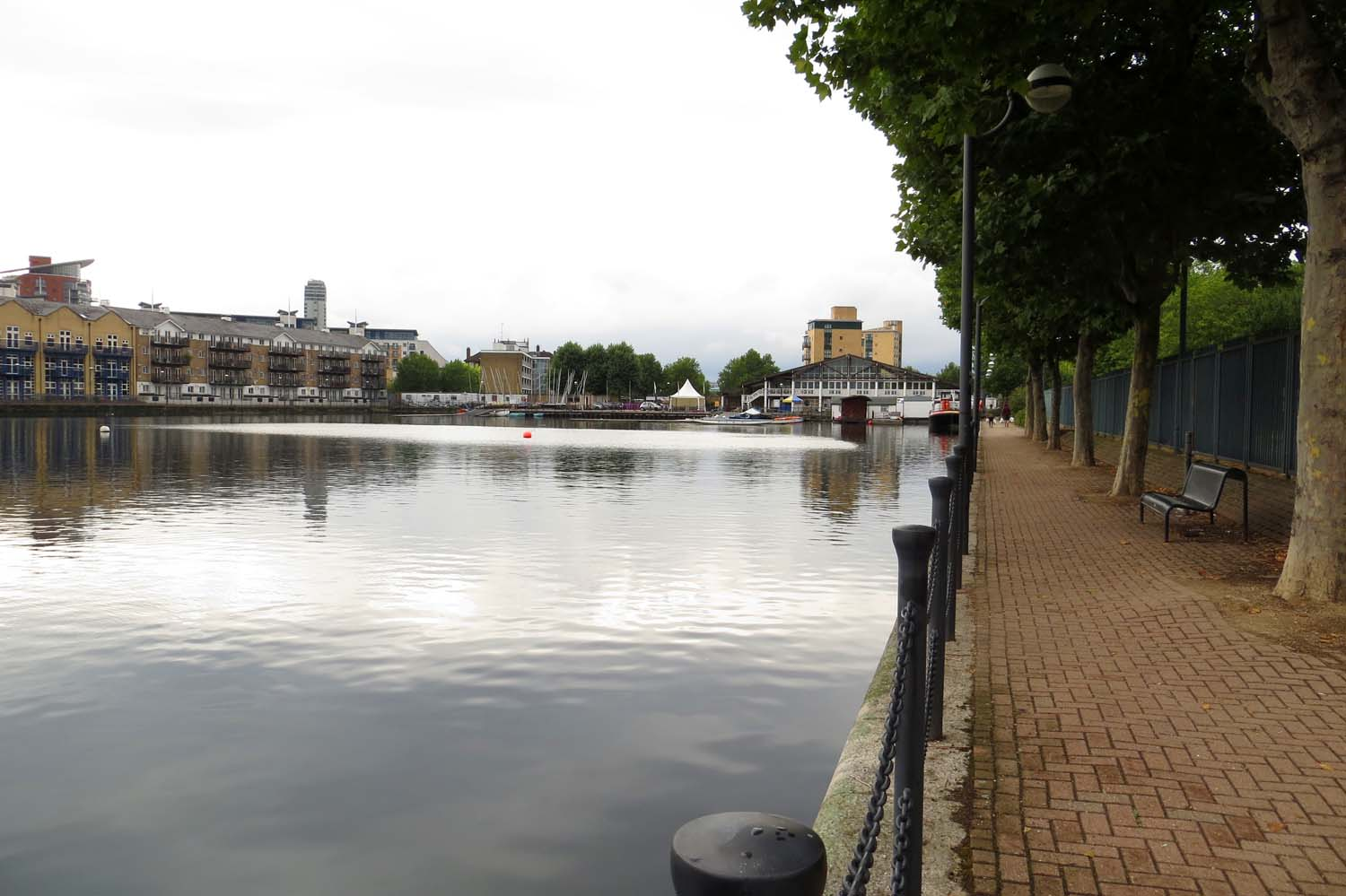
Millwall Outer Dock, September 2013

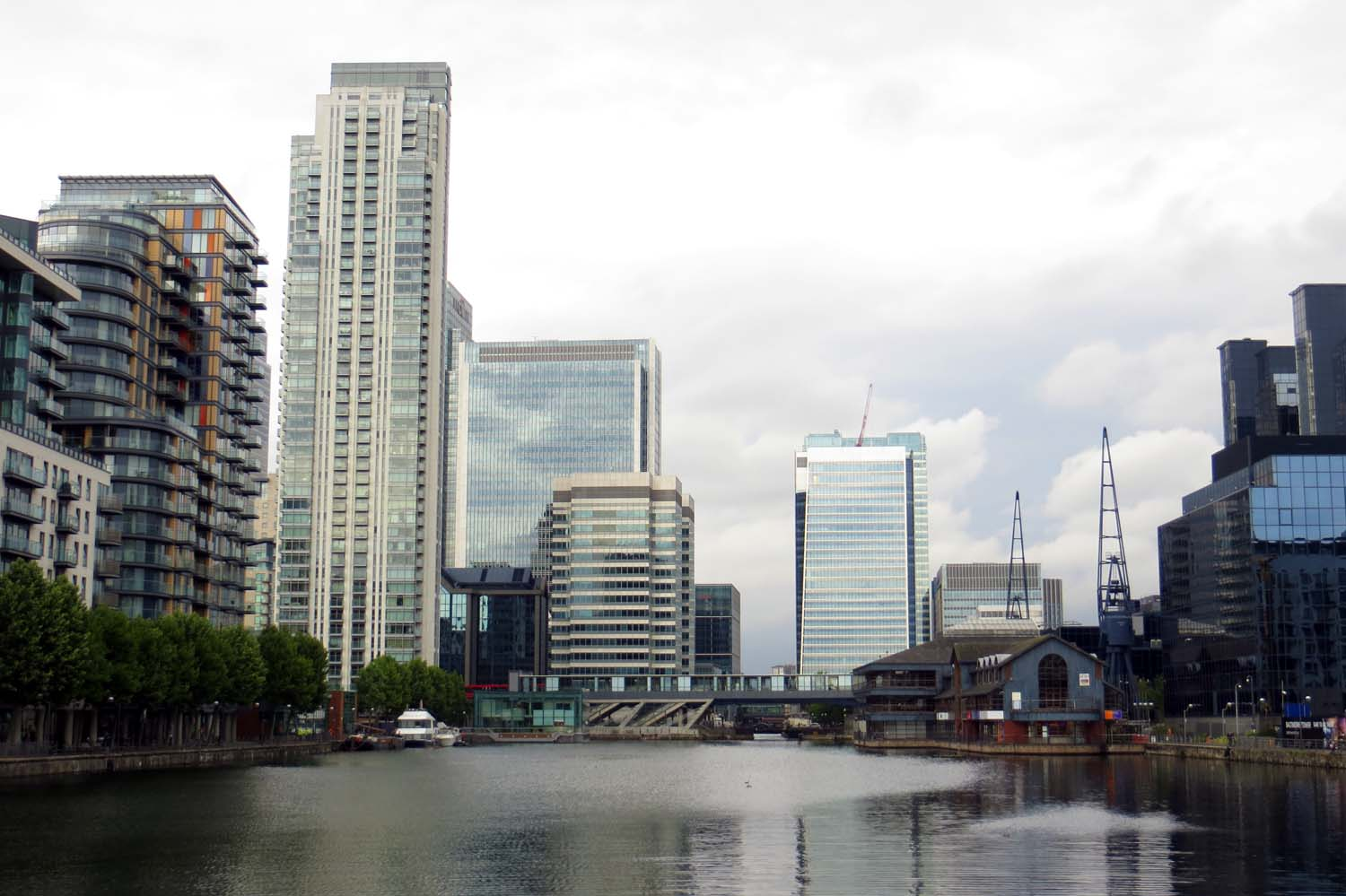
Millwall Inner Dock, September 2013

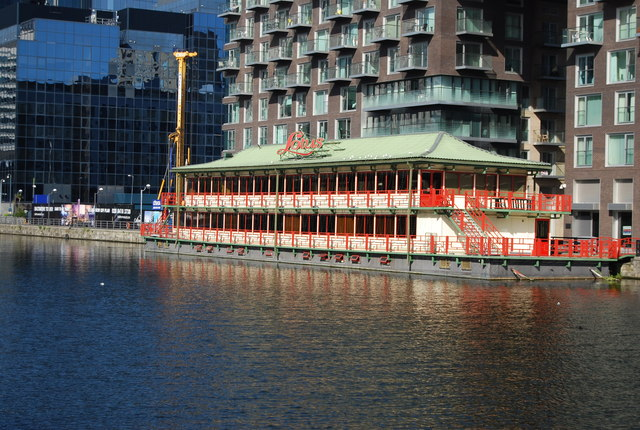
Floating restaurant, Millwall Dock, August 2013

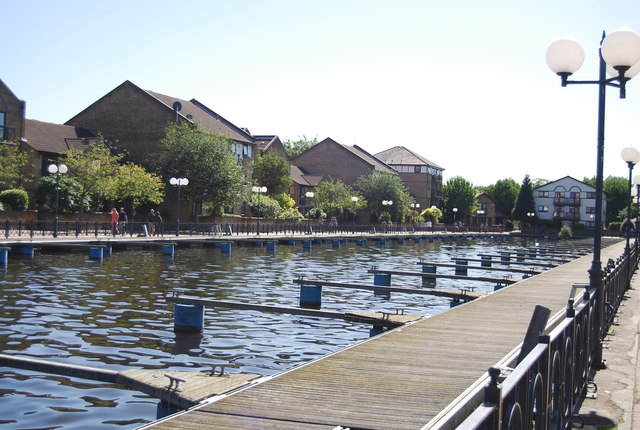
Side dock, Millwall Docks, August 2013

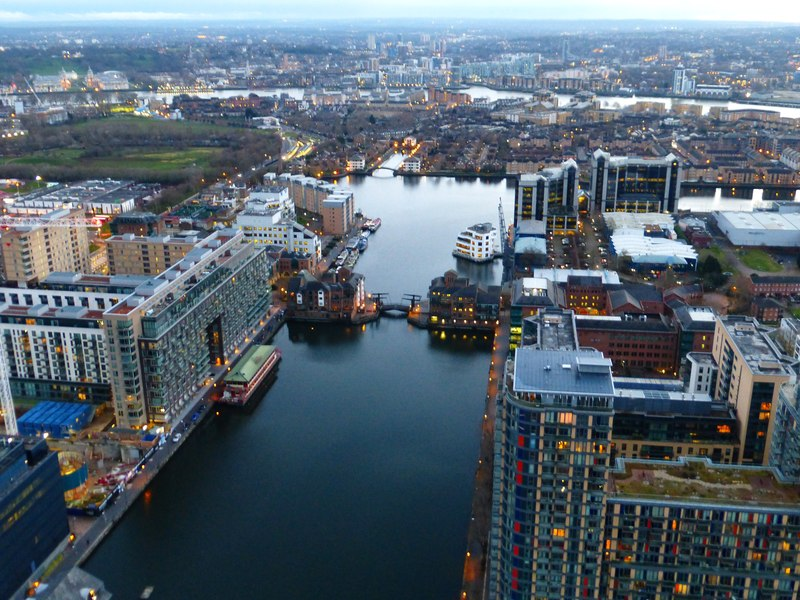
Looking south along Millwall Inner Dock, February 2014

== Bibliography ==
- "'The Millwall Docks: The docks'". Survey Survey of London: volumes 43 and 44: Poplar, Blackwall and Isle of Dogs (1994), pp. 353-356. English Heritage.
- 'Dockland: An illustrated historical survey of life and work in east London', NELP/GLC, 1983, ISBN 0-7168-1611-3
