= List of listed buildings in Clydebank =

This is a list of listed buildings in the former burgh of Clydebank in West Dunbartonshire, Scotland. Although burghs were abolished for administrative purposes in 1975, Historic Scotland continue to use them and civil parishes for the purposes of geographically categorising listed buildings.

== List ==
Name	Location	Date listed	Geo-coordinates	Notes	Category	LB number	Image
Public Library Dumbarton Road			55°54′05″N 4°24′31″W		B	22987	Upload another image
Hall Street Former Fire Station Tenement			55°54′03″N 4°24′31″W		B	22989	Upload Photo
Municipal Buildings Dumbarton Road			55°54′03″N 4°24′29″W		B	22986	Upload another image
11 Hume Street Former Co-Op Administrative Office Building			55°54′00″N 4°24′15″W		B	22992	Upload Photo
2 Sylvania Way South/Chalmers Street, Central Warehouse (Co-Op Department Store)			55°54′05″N 4°24′15″W		B	22991	Upload Photo
Sinclair Street, St Margaret's Roman Catholic Church And Presbytery			55°53′48″N 4°23′07″W		B	22994	Upload Photo
Hardgate, 13 Glasgow Road, Hardgate Hall (Former Duntocher Free Church)			55°55′31″N 4°24′22″W		C(S)	49986	Upload Photo
Clydebank Riverside Station			55°53′46″N 4°24′03″W		B	22988	Upload another image See more images
Titan Cantilever Crane, Former John Brown Shipbuilding Yard, Clydebank			55°53′50″N 4°24′31″W		A	22993	Upload another image See more images
Bruce Street, Former Public Baths And Swimming Pool			55°54′01″N 4°24′28″W		C(S)	51432	Upload another image
Clydebank, 404 Glasgow Road, Hamilton Memorial Church Including Gatepiers And Cast-Iron Railings			55°53′38″N 4°23′37″W		C(S)	49199	Upload Photo
Glasgow Road, Church of Our Holy Redeemer, Presbytery And Boundary Walls And Gatepiers			55°53′43″N 4°23′51″W		B	22990	Upload Photo

== Key ==
The scheme for classifying buildings in Scotland is:

- Category A: "buildings of national or international importance, either architectural or historic; or fine, little-altered examples of some particular period, style or building type."
- Category B: "buildings of regional or more than local importance; or major examples of some particular period, style or building type, which may have been altered."
- Category C: "buildings of local importance; lesser examples of any period, style, or building type, as originally constructed or moderately altered; and simple traditional buildings which group well with other listed buildings."

In March 2016 there were 47,288 listed buildings in Scotland. Of these, 8% were Category A, and 50% were Category B, with the remaining 42% being Category C.
