= Millwall Freehold Land and Dock Company =

Former English company

The Millwall Freehold Land and Dock Company was a 19th-century company set up to develop the central area of the Isle of Dogs in east London. Originally called the Millwall Canal Company, the act of Parliament for the incorporation of the company, the Millwall Canal, Wharfs and Graving Docks Act 1864 (27 & 28 Vict. c. cclv) received royal assent on 25 July 1864. It was renamed the Millwall Dock Company by the Millwall Dock Act 1870 (33 & 34 Vict. c. xx)

The plans that led to the foundation of the Millwall Freehold Land and Dock Company were first devised by Nathaniel Fenner and Robert Fairlie.
