= Clydebank Museum =

Museum in West Dunbartonshire, Scotland

Coordinates: 55°54′04″N 4°24′28″W

Clydebank Museum in Clydebank, West Dunbartonshire, Scotland was opened in 1980 in the Clydebank Town Hall, and is operated by West Dunbartonshire Council. The themes of its collection are related to the area's local history, which includes shipbuilding at John Brown & Company and the work of the Scottish Colourists. The museum's collection of Singer sewing machines, dating from 1850 to the early 1980s has been recognised by Museums Galleries Scotland as being of national significance. (Note: The Singer factory in Clydebank employed more than 16,000 people, but closed in 1980.) The Garden Gallery exhibits works by contemporary Scottish artists, which are available for sale.
