= Magnus Mowat =

Scottish railway engineer (1875–1953)

Brigadier-General Magnus Mowat CBE TD FRSE
- Born: 10 November 1875; Aberdeenshire, Scotland
- Died: 19 January 1953 (aged 77); Ebor House, East Sheen, London, England

Brigadier-General Magnus Mowat CBE TD FRSE (10 November 1875 – 19 January 1953) was a Scottish railway engineer. From 1920 to 1938 he was Secretary of the Institute of Mechanical Engineers.

== Life ==
He was born on 10 November 1875 the son of the Hon Magnus Mowat in Aberdeenshire. He was educated at Aberdeen Grammar School then Blackheath High School in London. He then studied engineering at King's College, London.

He served an apprenticeship at the North British Railway Works at Cowlairs. His first employment as an Engineer was as assistant in building the Leicester section for the Great Central Railway. From 1899 to 1901 he was engineer to the Grand Indian Peninsular Railway. In 1901 he joined Robert McAlpine & Son as engineer for the new Partick drainage system. In 1905 he joined Millwall Dock Company later being promoted to Chief Engineer and General Manager of the company. He then joined the London Port Authority.

He had been a senior officer in the Territorial Army's formation in 1909 and during the First World War he served as a senior commander in the Royal Engineers then was appointed Commandant of the School of Heavy Bridging and Commands Road Director at the War office.

In 1919 he was made a Commander of the Order of the British Empire by King George V. In October 1920 he replaced Edgar Worthington as Secretary of the Institute of Mechanical Engineers. In 1934 he was elected a Fellow of the Royal Society of Edinburgh. His proposers were Sir James Alfred Ewing, Sir Thomas Hudson Beare, Sir Thomas Holland and Sir Alexander Gibb.

He died at Ebor House in East Sheen south-west of London on 19 January 1953. He was unmarried and had no children.
