= Jane Rae =

British political activist

- Born: 20 December 1872; Denny, Falkirk, Scotland
- Died: 12 May 1959 (aged 86); Clydebank, Scotland
- Occupation: councillor
- Employer: Clydebank Council
- Known for: political activism, women's suffrage, temperance movement, anti-war
- Spouse: Alfred Coates

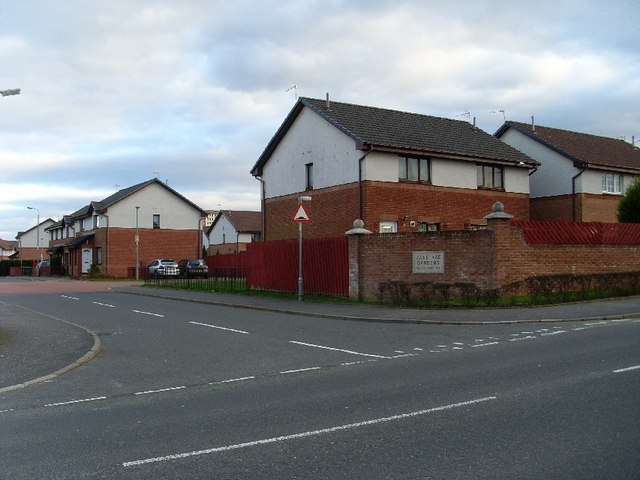
Jane Rae Gardens, Clydebank

Jane Rae (20 December 1872 – 12 May 1959) was a Scottish political activist, suffragist, councillor and justice of the peace. She was one of the activists involved in the 1911 all-out strike at the Singer Sewing Machine factory at Kilbowie in Clydebank. She was also active in the women's suffrage movement and in the Clydeside Rent Strike. She became Branch Secretary of the Clydebank branch of the Independent Labour Party, and served as a Labour councillor for Clydebank Town Council from 1922 to 1928. She is commemorated with a plaque in the gardens of Clydebank Town Hall.

== Early life ==
Rae was born in Denny, Falkirk on 20 December 1872 to Elizabeth Cossens and Livingston Rae, an ironmonger. She later moved to Clydebank with her family.

== Activism ==
Rae worked at the Singer Sewing Machine factory at Kilbowie in Clydebank in the 'Needle Flat' department where needles were made, sorted and checked. Resentful of the working practices imposed at the factory (including wage undercutting, increased workloads, job timing and work reorganisation), she became one of the activists in the all-out strike at the factory that ran from March to April in 1911. For her involvement in the strike, she and more than 400 of her fellow colleagues lost their jobs.

Rae was described as being strikingly tall, determined, strong-willed and studious, with political conviction in progressing society and improving conditions for workers. After hearing the Scottish socialist Keir Hardie speak she joined the Clydebank branch of the Independent Labour Party, going on to become its Branch Secretary in 1913.

She was active in women's suffrage, and once chaired a talk given by Emmeline Pankhurst at Clydebank Town Hall. She was also involved in the temperance, anti-war and cooperative movements, and in the Clydeside Rent Strike. In 1922 she was elected as a Labour Party councillor for Clydebank Town Council, holding her seat until 1928.

By virtue of having won the most votes in the 1922 election Jane was elected to head of the Dunbartonshire Education Authority . Combative from the start, at her first meeting as Chair, she quoted a paragraph from The Glasgow Herald while at the same time describing it as “mouthpiece of the oppressor”.

Six years later at a farewell event, prior to her departure for Australia, a fellow committee member and political opponent confessed to being intimidated at the thought of working with her but her fears evaporated after their first meeting when she realised that “our political views were different but the education of our children, stands on a higher plane than that of politics. I believe we have mutual respect for each other.”

She was also a Justice of the Peace, and in carrying out her duties was known for handing out the toughest sentences possible to men that had subjected women to domestic violence.

== Later life and death ==
In 1929, after the death of her mother, Rae married her longtime Australian friend Alfred Coates, and emigrated with him to Australia. In 1938 Rae and her husband returned to the UK, settling in the Channel Islands. When the islands came under German occupation during World War II, she witnessed the brutality of the Nazis towards Soviet prisoners of war and as a precaution destroyed all of her socialist literature, information and records.

In 1946, after her husband died, Rae returned to Clydebank where she remained until her death in 1959.

== Tributes ==
A plaque erected by West Dunbartonshire Council in honour of Rae is in the gardens of the Town Hall on Dumbarton Road. On unveiling the plaque Provost Douglas McAllister said "This memorial plaque is in recognition of the many activities, locally and nationally that Jane was involved in. Her determination to help and support others, regardless of the personal consequences to herself was quite remarkable. She cared passionately about her community and was also involved in the Clydebank Rent Strike during the 1920s."

Jane Rae Gardens on the Whitecrook housing estate is named in commemoration of her.

In 2012 the BBC produced a short film about the strike at the Singer Sewing Machine factory, and an actor portraying Jane Rae narrated the story.
