= Clydebank Town Hall =

Municipal building in Clydebank, Scotland

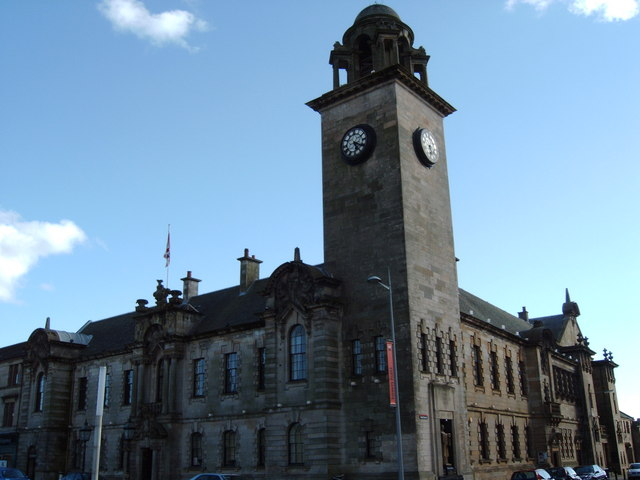
- Clydebank Town Hall

- Shown in West Dunbartonshire
- 55.9006°N 4.4081°W
- Location: Dumbarton Road, Clydebank

History
- Built: 1902

Site notes
- Architect: James Miller
- Architectural style: Renaissance style

Listed Building – Category B
- Official name: Municipal Buildings, Dumbarton Road
- Designated: 5 March 1971
- Reference no.: LB22986

Clydebank Town Hall is a municipal building in Dumbarton Road, Clydebank, Scotland. The town hall, which was the headquarters of Clydebank Burgh Council, is a Category B listed building.

== History ==
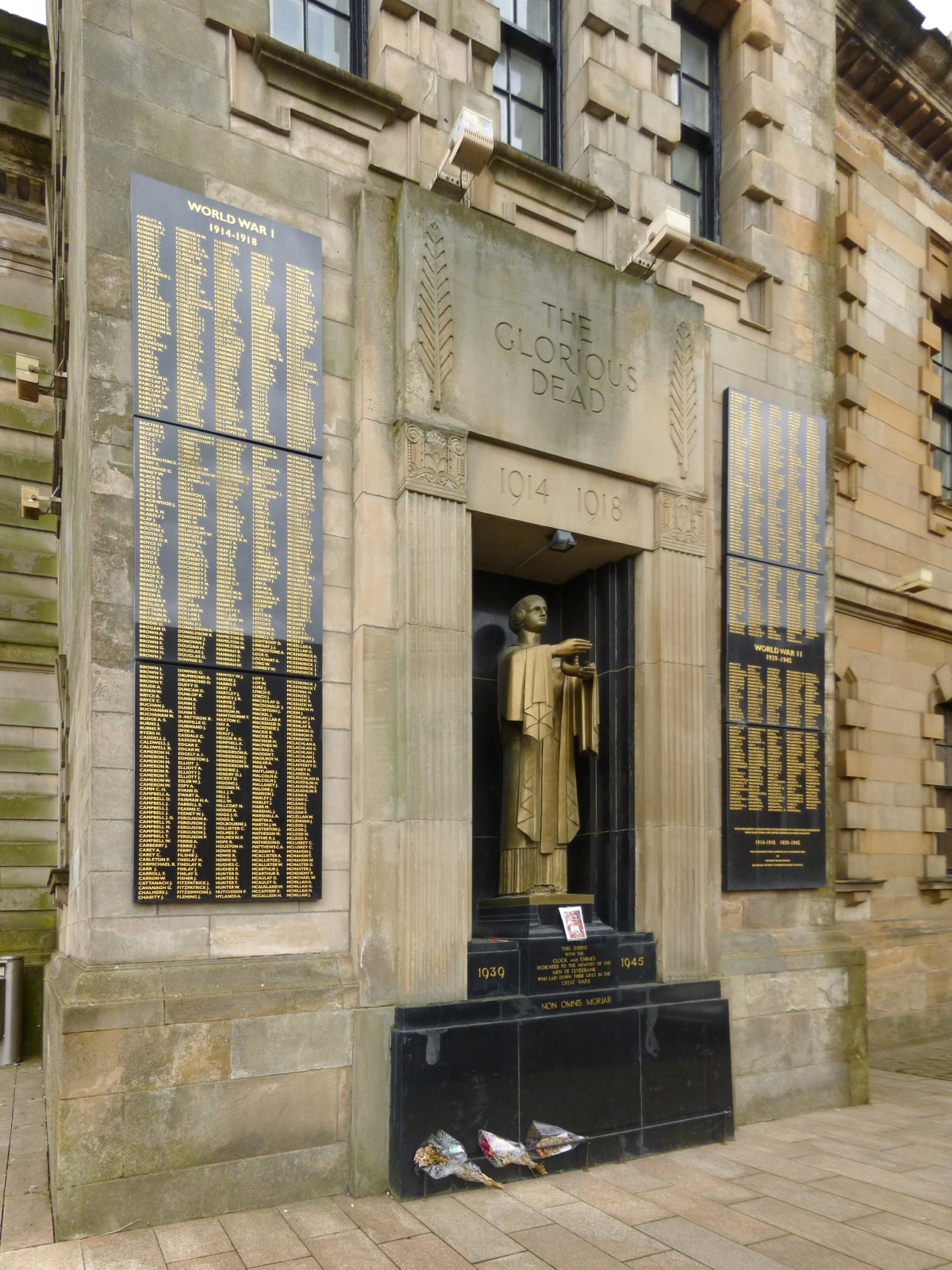
The war memorial at the town hall

Following significant population growth, largely associated with the shipbuilding industry, the area became a burgh in November 1886. Civic leaders initially held their meetings in a shop in Glasgow Road but, after finding this arrangement inadequate, they decided to procure a dedicated town hall: the site they selected was open land on the southwest side of Dumbarton Road.

The foundation stone for the new building was laid by the member of parliament for Kilmarnock Burghs, Colonel John Denny, on 23 June 1900. It was designed by James Miller in the Renaissance style, built in ashlar stone and was officially opened by the provost, Andrew Stewart, on 4 April 1902. The design involved a symmetrical main frontage with nine bays facing onto Dumbarton Road with the end bays projected forward and topped with segmental open pediments containing carved figures in the tympanums; the central bay, which was also projected forward, featured a doorway with a wrought iron grill flanked by Ionic order columns supporting an entablature which was decorated with an elaborate carved coat of arms. On the first floor there was a balcony with a French door flanked by two pairs of Ionic order columns supporting an arch containing more carved figures. Above the arch was a cartouche flanked by two urns. Set back on the right hand side was a tall clock tower with a cupola. Internally, the principal rooms were the main hall and the council chamber.

Shortly after she was elected secretary of the local branch of the Independent Labour Party in 1913, the political activist, Jane Rae, hosted a talk by the suffragette, Emmeline Pankhurst, in the town hall. A war memorial to commemorate the lives of service personnel who had died in the First World War was sculpted by Walter Gilbert, installed on the Hall Street elevation at the foot of the tower and unveiled by the Lord Lieutenant of Dunbartonshire, Sir Iain Colquhoun, on 8 June 1931.

Despite the close proximity to the shipyard of John Brown & Company, the town hall only suffered minor damage in the Clydebank Blitz in March 1941 during the Second World War. A figure of an angel, also referred to as "Mercury", sculpted by Albert Hodge, which had originally been installed on top of the cupola was relocated to the main vestibule after being damaged in a hurricane in 1968.

The town hall continued to serve as the headquarters of Clydebank Burgh Council for much of the 20th century and initially remained the meeting place of the enlarged Clydebank District Council after it was formed in 1975. However, most of the council's officers and departments relocated to new council offices in Rosebery Place in 1980. Instead, the Clydebank Museum, which was established to exhibit aspects of local history, was opened in the town hall in 1980. A Wurlitzer organ with three manuals, which had originally been installed in the Ritz cinema in Stockport was transferred to the town hall in September 1998, but after having been repeatedly damaged by flooding from the River Clyde, it was removed for its own protection and was transferred to Pollokshaws Burgh Hall in 2007. Following an extensive programme of refurbishment works costing £3.7 million, Clydebank Town Hall reopened as a venue for marriages and civil partnership ceremonies in 2013.

== See also ==
- List of listed buildings in Clydebank
