= Boquhan =

Coordinates: 56.059°N 04.352°W

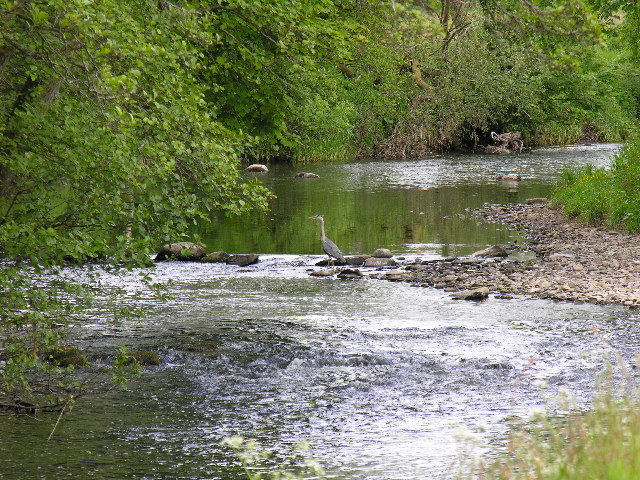
- The Endrick Water by Boquhan

- Location within the Stirling council area
- OS grid reference: NS535876
- Civil parish: Killearn
- Council area: Stirling
- Lieutenancy area: Stirling and Falkirk
- Country: Scotland
- Sovereign state: United Kingdom
- Post town: GLASGOW
- Postcode district: G63
- Dialling code: 01360
- Police: Scotland
- Fire: Scottish
- Ambulance: Scottish
- UK Parliament: Stirling and Strathallan
- Scottish Parliament: Stirling

Boquhan (pronounced Bow-whawn) is a hamlet in Stirling, Scotland, sometimes known as Wester Boquhan to distinguish it from another Boquhan, near Kippen. The hamlet lies 1 mile (1.6 km) southwest of the village of Balfron and 1.25 miles (2.01 km) northeast of Killearn.

Just east of Boquhan is Boquhan Old House which dates from 1784.

Boquhan is in the catchment area for Balfron Primary School and Balfron High School.
