= Gargunnock =

Coordinates: 56.126°N 4.085°W

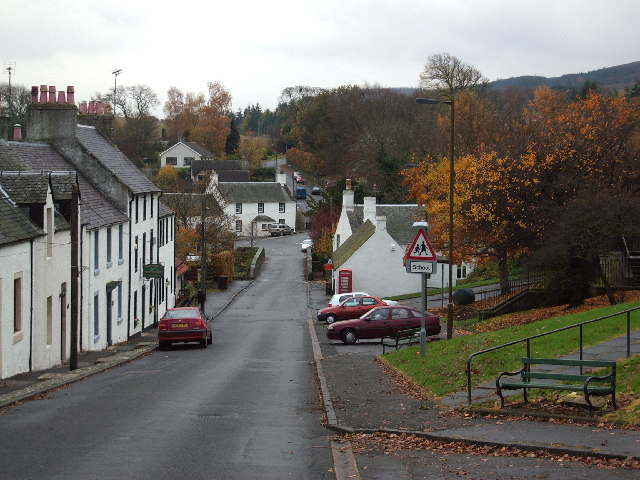
- The Main Street in Gargunnock

- Location within the Stirling council area
- Population: 720 (2020)
- OS grid reference: NS705945
- Civil parish: Gargunnock
- Council area: Stirling
- Country: Scotland
- Sovereign state: United Kingdom
- Post town: Stirling
- Postcode district: FK8
- Dialling code: 01786
- Police: Scotland
- Fire: Scottish
- Ambulance: Scottish
- UK Parliament: Stirling and Strathallan
- Scottish Parliament: Stirling
- Website: gargunnock.com

Gargunnock is a small village in the Stirling council area with an active community trust, seven miles (eleven kilometres) west of Stirling, in Scotland. The census population was 912. It is situated on the south edge of the Carse of Stirling, at the foot of the Gargunnock Hills, part of the Campsie Fells.

Several small burns flow down from the Gargunnock Hills

The last naturally suitable crossing point on the Forth before reaching Stirling Bridge is situated just outside Gargunnock. This, coupled with the land condition and drainage around the feet of the Gargunnock hills, made Gargunnock the ideal location to build a farming settlement.

During the occupation of Scotland, the English posted a battalion in the Peel tower on the outskirts of the village to protect this important ferry. It is believed that William Wallace brought his army through Gargunnock (called Gargowans at the time), setting up fort on the Kier Hill, to take control of this part of the river in advance of the Battle of Stirling Bridge. Bonnie Prince Charlie is also said to have passed through the village on his travels.

== Known for ==
Gargunnock House and Estate are focal points of the village dating back to the 16th century. Starting life as a tower house, over the following 200 years wings were added with the final wing completed in 1794. Charles Stirling, the fifth son of an old and distinguished family and who had prospered as a merchant in Glasgow, bought the remodelled Gargunnock in 1835. His great-granddaughter, Miss Viola Stirling, was the last of the family to own and run the estate. On her death in 1989 she left Gargunnock to trustees, with the hope that it could be 'preserved and administered so as to exemplify and perpetuate the tradition of Scottish country life. It is also said that Frédéric Chopin once played at the house as Charles Stirling's sister Jane was a pupil of his.

Gargunnock is also the home to the Gargunnock Show, founded in 1794 and hosted annually the show is one of the longest running in Scotland.

More recently, during the nineteenth century Gargunnock was famous for its fine oak-spale baskets, until intensive deforestation removed the raw materials necessary for this trade and the industry moved to Loch Lomond.

Gargunnock War Memorial was erected in 1919 to a design by Sir Robert Lorimer marking the local people killed during the First World War. Additional names were added at the close of the Second World War.

A railway station, around 1 kilometre from the village, was opened by the Forth and Clyde Junction Railway in 1856 and was closed to passengers in 1934.

The majority of pupils from Gargunnock Primary continue their secondary education at the nearby Stirling High School, with others attending Balfron High School.

On Tuesday, July 6, 2021, the Gargunnock Village Store experienced a fire, leaving it vacant. In late 2021 Gargunnock Community Council explored various options to purchase and renovate the building, eventually setting up a Community Benefit Society (Gargunnock Community Shop Ltd, which operates with a volunteer management team) to achieve this. Amongst other funding, and a successful community share offer, it received £150,000 grant from the Scottish Land Fund to buy the shop which was reopened in December 2024 under a tenancy agreement with an established retailer.

In August 2023 the UCI Road World Championships time trials route went through the village with the Gargunnock Inn playing host as an "Official Event Fan Zone".
