= Aberfoyle railway station =

Disused railway station in Aberfoyle, Stirling

Aberfoyle
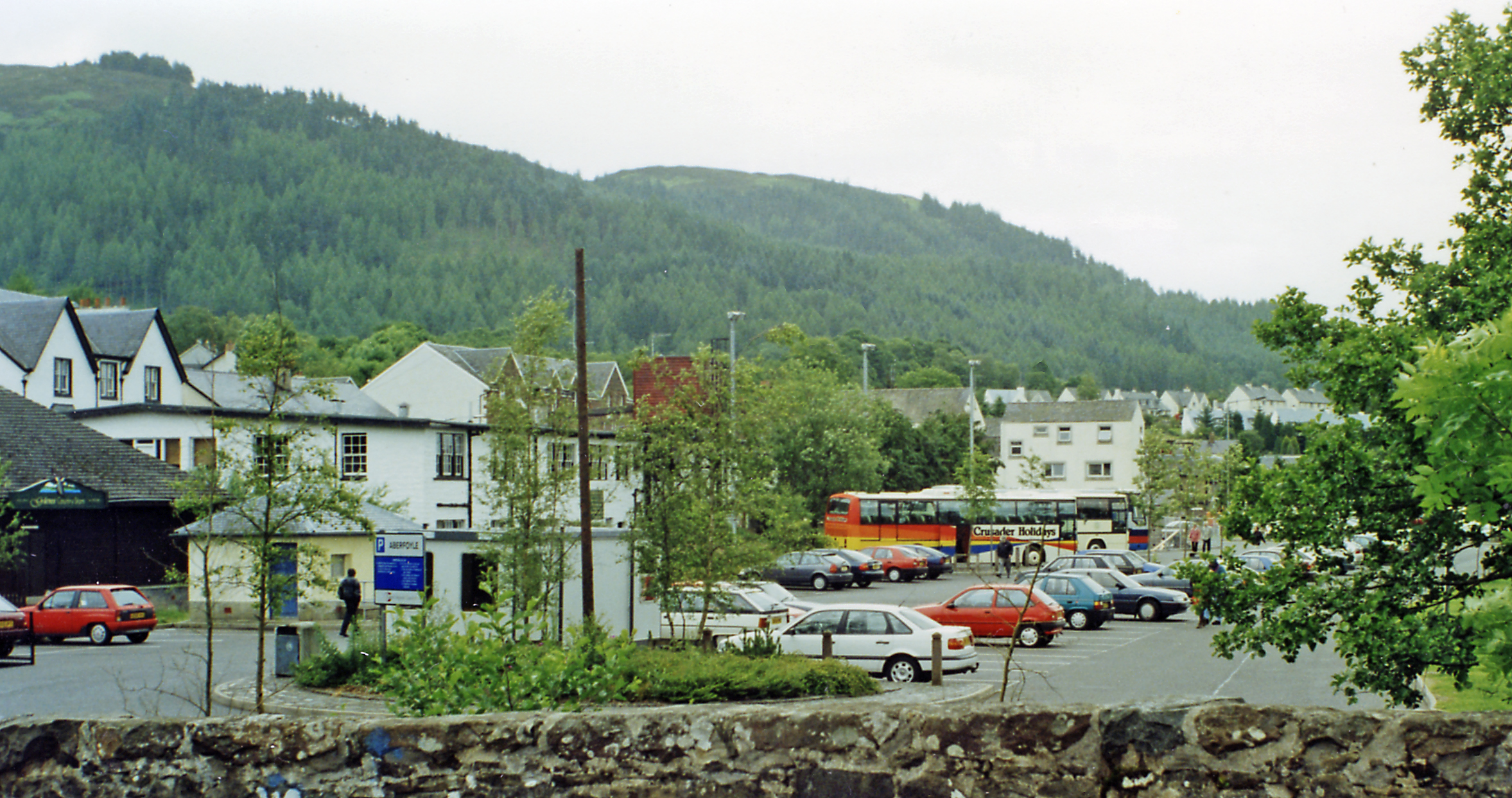
- Location of the former station (1997)

General information
- Location: Aberfoyle, Stirling; Scotland
- Coordinates: 56.17755°N 4.38303°W
- Platforms: 1

Other information
- Status: Disused

History
- Original company: Strathendrick and Aberfoyle Railway
- Pre-grouping: North British Railway
- Post-grouping: London and North Eastern Railway

Key dates
- 1 August 1882: Station opens
- 1 October 1951: Station closes
- 5 October 1959: closed for freight
Location

Aberfoyle railway station served the village of Aberfoyle in Scotland between 1882 and 1951.

== History ==
The station was opened by the Strathendrick and Aberfoyle Railway on 1 August 1882 as the terminus of a short branch line from Buchlyvie on the Forth and Clyde Junction Railway.

The line was absorbed into the North British Railway, it became part of the London and North Eastern Railway during the Grouping of 1923.

The station was host to a LNER camping coach from 1935 to 1939.

It became part of the Scottish Region of British Railways on nationalisation in 1948.

The line and station closed to passengers on 1 October 1951 and to freight on 5 October 1959.

Preceding station	Historical railways	Following station
Gartmore	North British Railway; Strathendrick and Aberfoyle Railway	Terminus

== The site today ==
The old station is now demolished, replaced by a parking space.
