= Drymen railway station =

Disused railway station in Croftamie, Stirling

Drymen
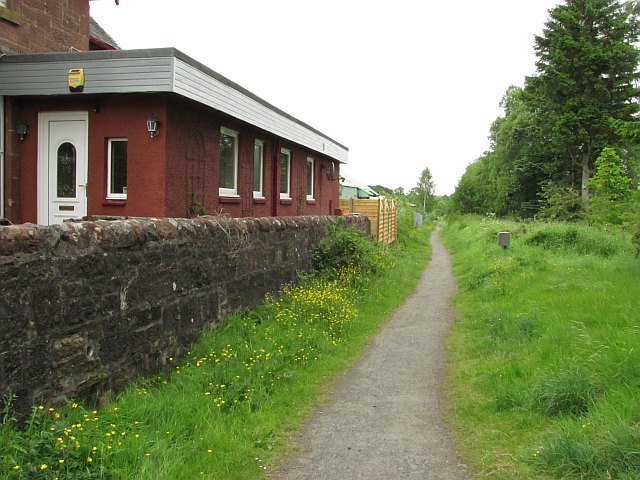
- The site of the station in 2010

General information
- Location: Croftamie, Stirling; Scotland
- Coordinates: 56.0454°N 4.4442°W
- Grid reference: NS478863
- Platforms: 2

Other information
- Status: Disused

History
- Original company: Forth and Clyde Junction Railway
- Pre-grouping: North British Railway
- Post-grouping: London and North Eastern Railway

Key dates
- 26 May 1856: Opened
- 1 October 1934: Closed
Location

Drymen railway station served the village of Croftamie, Stirling, Scotland, from 1856 to 1934 on the Forth and Clyde Junction Railway.

== History ==
The station was opened on 26 May 1856 by the Forth and Clyde Junction Railway. The station building was on the eastbound platform and the goods yard was served from the east. The station closed on 1 October 1934. The nearby signal box was reduced to a signal box after closure. The station building and the goods shed survives today.

| Preceding station | Disused railways | Following station |
|---|---|---|
| Caldarvan; Line and station closed | Forth and Clyde Junction Railway | Gartness; Line and station closed |
