= Ladylands Platform railway station =

Disused railway station in Kippen, Stirling

Kippen

General information
- Location: Kippen, Stirling; Scotland
- Coordinates: 56.1341°N 4.2071°W
- Grid reference: NS851591
- Platforms: 1

Other information
- Status: Disused

History
- Original company: Forth and Clyde Junction Railway
- Pre-grouping: North British Railway
- Post-grouping: London and North Eastern Railway

Key dates
- June 1861: Opened as Ladylands Siding
- 11 July 1927: Name changed to Ladylands Platform
- 1 October 1934: Closed
Location

Ladylands Platform railway station co-served the village of Kippen, Stirling, Scotland, from 1861 to 1934 on the Forth and Clyde Junction Railway.

== History ==
The station was opened as Ladylands Siding in June 1861 by the Forth and Clyde Junction Railway, although there is evidence of it being used earlier on 25 June 1858 for Balgair Fair. As well as being a passenger station, it was also a farm siding, hence its original name. The siding was to the north. To the north side of the line was a railway crossing. The station's name was changed to Ladylands Platform on 11 July 1927. It closed on 1 October 1934.

Preceding station	Disused railways	Following station
Port of Menteith; Line and station closed	Forth and Clyde Junction Railway	Fairfield Siding; Line and station closed
