= Fairfield Siding railway station =

Short-lived railway station in Kippen, Stirling

Fairfield Siding

General information
- Location: Kippen, Stirling; Scotland
- Coordinates: 56.1327°N 4.1981°W

Other information
- Status: Disused

History
- Original company: Forth and Clyde Junction Railway
- Pre-grouping: Forth and Clyde Junction Railway

Key dates
- June 1861: Opened
- October 1866: Closed
Location

Fairfield Siding railway station co-served the village of Kippen, Stirling, Scotland, from 1861 to 1866 on the Forth and Clyde Junction Railway.

== History ==
The station was opened in June 1861 by the Forth and Clyde Junction Railway. It was only used on Fridays. It was also a farm siding, the farm being to the north. There was also a cottage on the south side of the line. The station closed in October 1866.

Preceding station	Disused railways	Following station
Ladylands Platform; Line and station closed	Forth and Clyde Junction Railway	Kippen; Line and station closed
