= Gartness railway station =

Disused railway station in Gartness, Stirling

Gartness
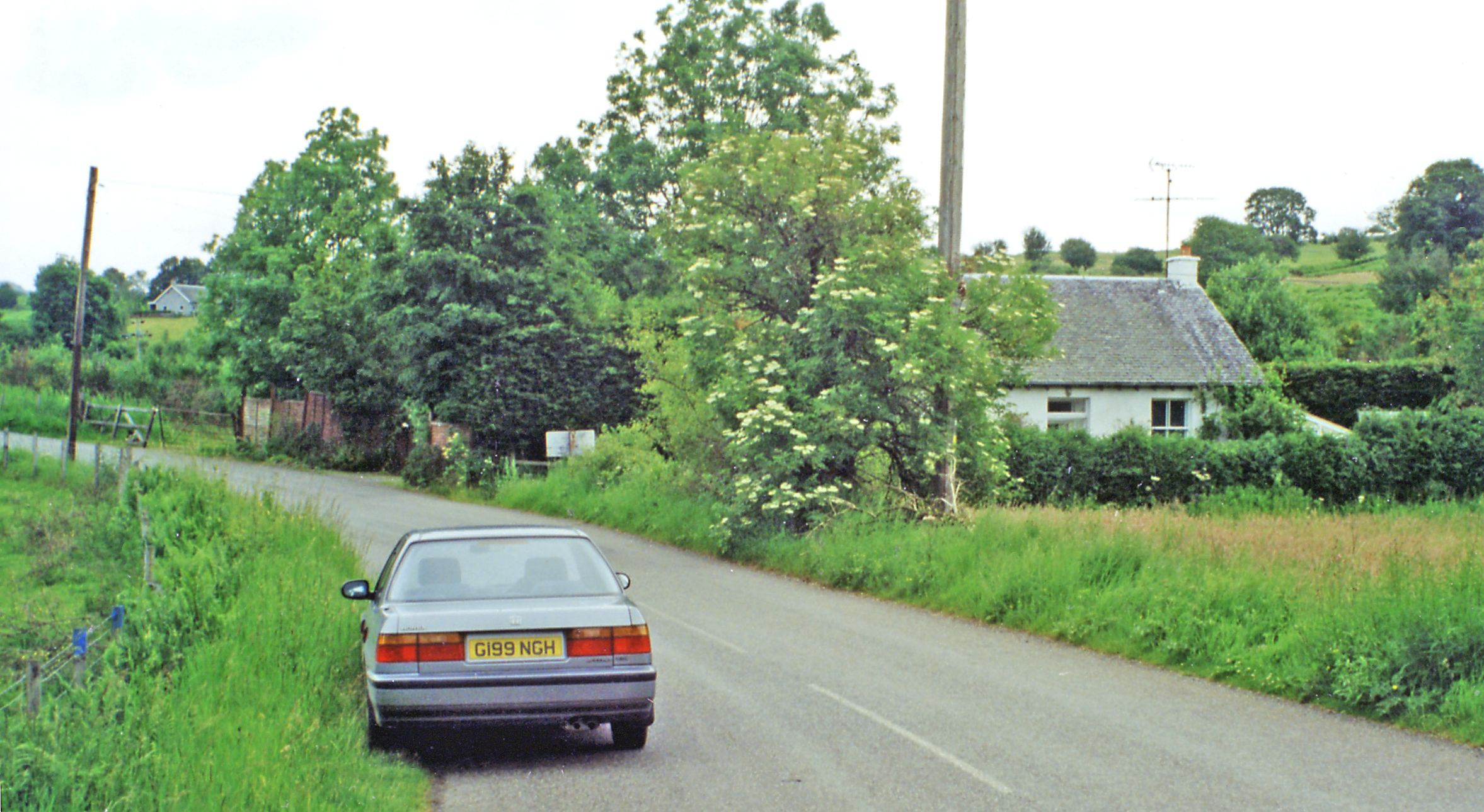
- The site of the station, looking northeast towards Stirling, in 1997

General information
- Location: Gartness, Stirling; Scotland
- Coordinates: 56.051056°N 4.411352°W
- Grid reference: NS501874
- Platforms: 1

Other information
- Status: Disused

History
- Original company: Forth and Clyde Junction Railway
- Pre-grouping: North British Railway
- Post-grouping: London and North Eastern Railway

Key dates
- 26 May 1856: Opened
- 1 October 1934: Closed to passengers
- 1 November 1950: Closed to goods
Location

Gartness railway station served the hamlet of Gartness, Stirling, Scotland, from 1856 to 1934 on the Forth and Clyde Junction Railway.

== History ==
The station was opened on 26 May 1856 by the Forth and Clyde Junction Railway. To the east end was a siding and to the west was a level crossing. The station closed to passengers on 1 October 1934 and closed to goods on 1 November 1950.

Preceding station	Disused railways	Following station
Drymen; Line and station closed	Forth and Clyde Junction Railway	Balfron; Line and station closed
