= Gartmore railway station =

Disused railway station in Gartmore, Stirling

Gartmore

General information
- Location: Gartmore, Stirlingshire; Scotland
- Coordinates: 56.1594°N 4.3654°W
- Grid reference: NS531988
- Platforms: 1

Other information
- Status: Disused

History
- Original company: North British Railway
- Pre-grouping: North British Railway
- Post-grouping: London and North Eastern Railway; British Railways (Scottish Region)

Key dates
- 2 October 1882: Opened
- 2 January 1950: Closed
Location

Gartmore railway station served the village of Gartmore, in the historical county of Stirlingshire, Scotland, from 1882 to 1950 on the Strathendrick and Aberfoyle Railway.

== History ==
The station was opened on 2 October 1882 by the North British Railway. It served the nearby Gartmore House. On the west side was a loading bank and the signal box. The station closed on 2 January 1950.

Preceding station	Disused railways	Following station
Aberfoyle; Line and station closed	North British Railway; Strathendrick and Aberfoyle Railway	Buchlyvie; Line and station closed
