= Kippen =

Coordinates: 56.127°N 4.173°W

Kippen: Scottish Gaelic: An Ceapan
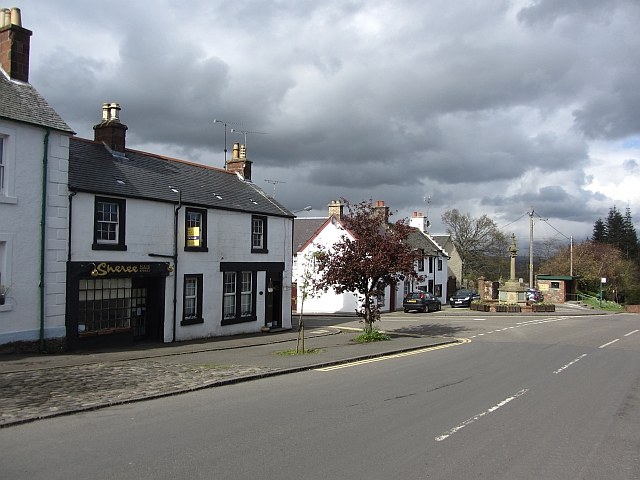
- Main Street, Kippen

- Location within the Stirling council area
- Population: 1,100 (2020)
- OS grid reference: NS650948
- Civil parish: Kippen
- Council area: Stirling
- Country: Scotland
- Sovereign state: United Kingdom
- Post town: Stirling
- Postcode district: FK8
- Dialling code: 01786
- Police: Scotland
- Fire: Scottish
- Ambulance: Scottish
- UK Parliament: Stirling and Strathallan
- Scottish Parliament: Stirling

Kippen is a village in west Stirlingshire, Scotland. It lies between the Gargunnock Hills and the Fintry Hills and overlooks the Carse of Forth to the north. The village is 9 miles (14 kilometres) west of Stirling and 20 mi (32 km) north of Glasgow. It is 4 1/2 mi (7 km) south-east of Loch Lomond and the Trossachs National Park, Scotland's first National Park.

The village lies on the line of an eighteenth-century military road between Stirling and Balloch, although a bypass around the village was built in 1971 meaning Kippen no longer lies on the A811. According to the 2001 census, the population of Kippen was 1,140.

== History ==
=== Earls of Menteith ===
Kippen's church was first mentioned in public records in the 1300s, though by this time it had been used as the burial place for the Earls of Menteith for many generations.

=== Kippen vine ===
In 1891, Duncan Buchanan planted a vineyard in the village and one of its vines grew to be the largest in the world. The Kippen Vine covered an area of 5,000 square feet (460 m^{2}), spreading across four greenhouses. It became a famous tourist attraction, until the Kippen Vinery had to close in 1964.

=== King of Kippen ===
There is a story of questionable authenticity relating to the time of King James V of Scotland. John Buchanan was the proprietor of nearby Arnprior, and became known as the "King of Kippen" after an episode between himself and the king. King James was fond of travelling in disguise under the title of "The Guid Man o' Ballengeich", after the steep path leading down from the Castle of Stirling. The King, with his nobles, residing in Stirling Castle, sent a party for some deer to the hills in the neighbourhood of Gartmore. On their return to Stirling with the venison they passed through Arnprior, where they were attacked by the chief and relieved of their burden. Berated by the party for so ruthlessly taking from them what belonged to the King, Buchanan replied that if James was King in Scotland, he was King of Kippen. When the messengers reported the circumstance to the King, he resolved to wait on his neighbouring majesty of Kippen, and rode out one day with a small retinue from Stirling.

Demanding admittance at the palace of Arnprior, he was refused by a fierce warrior standing at the gate with a battle-axe sloped on his shoulder, who told him there was no admission, as his chief was at dinner with a large company and could not be disturbed at that time. "Tell your master," said James, "the Guidman o' Ballengeich humbly requests an audience of the 'King of Kippen'." Buchanan, guessing the quality of his guest, received His Majesty with the appropriate honours, and became so great a favourite that he had leave to draw upon the carrier as often as he pleased, and was invited, as "King of Kippen" to visit his brother sovereign at Stirling.

=== Railway Station ===
A railway station, around 1 mile from the village, was opened by the Forth and Clyde Junction Railway in 1856 and was closed to passengers in 1934.

== Facilities ==
Kippen is in the catchment area for Balfron High School – the local high school situated in the nearby village of Balfron. The local primary school is situated on the Main Street in Kippen. The village is also home to a Church of Scotland parish church on Fore Road – Kippen Parish Church, which has 15 "superb" stained glass windows by Herbert Hendrie.

== Sport ==
Kippen F.C. are the local welfare football team, and play in the Forth and Endrick Football League. The local rugby team is Strathendrick RFC who play their home games in the nearby village of Fintry. The Kippen Curling Club play regular matches during the winter season at The Peak indoor rink in Stirling.

== The Kippen Street Fayre ==
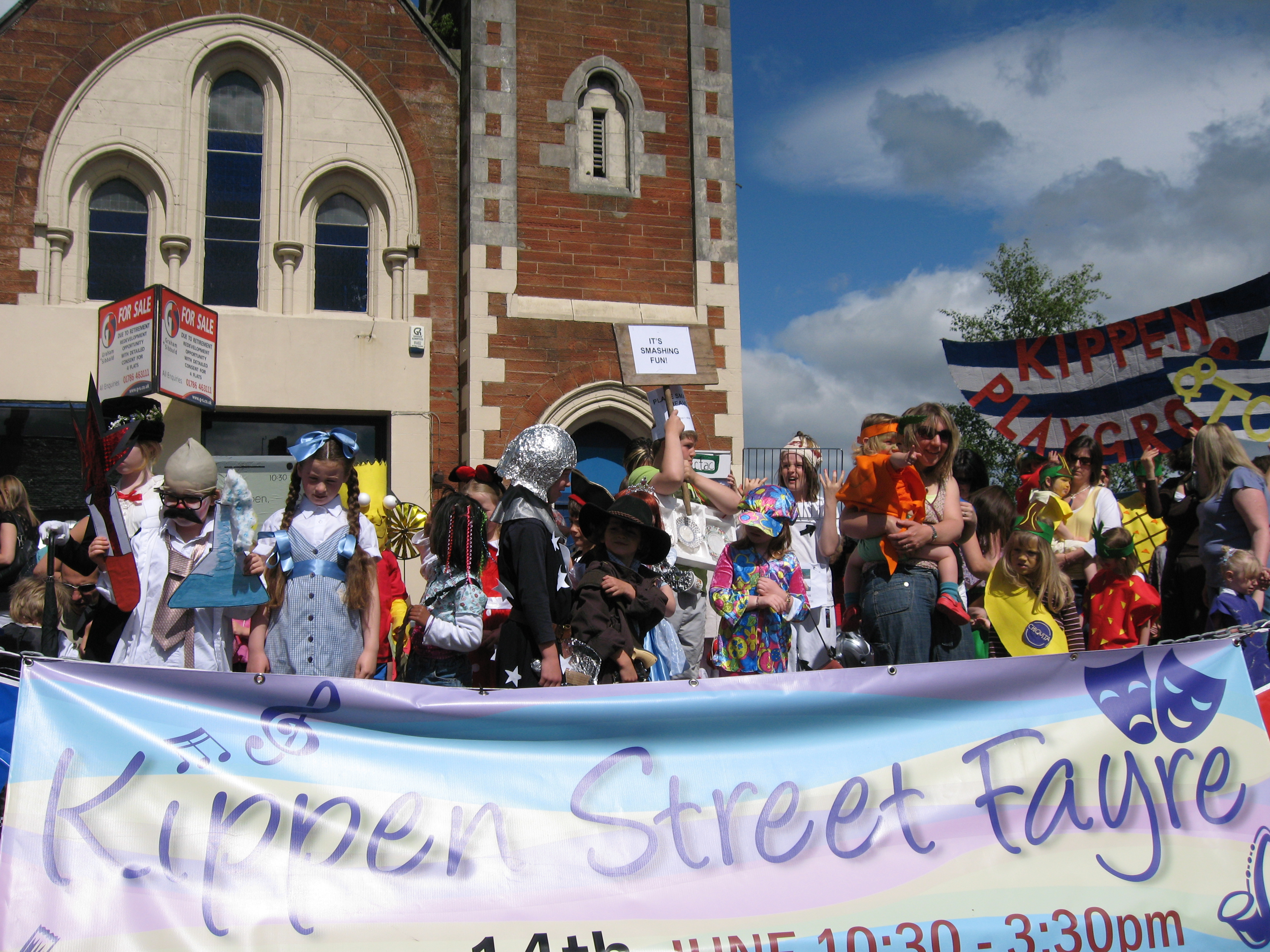
The fancy dress parade at the Kippen Street Fayre 2008

Kippen hosts an annual gala called the "Street Fayre", which brings tourists to the village, helping boost the local economy and raise funds for charities. This event features a range of food, bric-a-brack and charity stalls which line the main street and, elsewhere, musical events. As of 2013, the Street Fayre is officially opened by the Fayre Queen and King who are chosen randomly from pupils at Kippen Primary school.

== Notable people from Kippen ==
- John Dougall was a mathematician born here in 1867.
- Dan Drysdale, rugby player
- Carola Macaulay was one of the first women traders in Edinburgh. She was born here in 1682.
- Iain Turner, footballer
