= Balfron High School =

Coordinates: 56°04′21″N 4°19′45″W

Location
- Roman Road; Balfron, Glasgow, G63 OPW; Scotland

Information
- Type: State School
- Mottoes: Respect, Responsibility, Honesty, Fairness, Trust
- Established: 1925
- Local authority: Stirling Council
- Educational authority: Stirling Council
- Headteacher: Elaine Bannatyne
- Gender: Coeducational
- Age: 11 to 19
- Enrolment: c. 948
- Classes offered: French, German, Spanish, English, Modern Studies, Sociology, Geography, History, Biology, Art, Music, Maths, Graphic Communication, Business, Wood Work, Metal work, Chemistry, physics, PE, Sports leadership
- Language: English
- Houses: Campsie, Endrick, Lomond
- Colours: Black, White & Purple
- National ranking: 23
- Feeder schools: Drymen Primary, Balfron Primary, Strathblaine Primary, Killearn Primary, Fintry Primary school & Kippen Primary
- Website: http://www.balfronhigh.org.uk

Balfron High School is a secondary school situated in the village of Balfron, approximately 18 miles (29 km) west of Stirling and 16 miles (26 km) north of Glasgow. The catchment area extends over most of West Stirlingshire including the villages of Arnprior, Balfron, Balmaha, Blanefield, Buchlyvie, Croftamie, Drymen, Fintry, Killearn, Kippen, Milton of Buchanan and Strathblane, along with the hamlets of Balfron Station, Boquhan, Buchanan Smithy, Dumgoyne, Gartness and Mugdock. The school also has pupils attending from other nearby areas of Dunbartonshire and Stirlingshire.

== History ==
Balfron High School grew out of the Parish Church of Balfron, which can be traced back to the 17th century. The school became a High School in 1925 with the original school building in Balfron dating back to the early part of the 20th century. A major extension was built in the 1960s. The old school was known for being too small, due to the use of many mobile classrooms that were originally only meant as a temporary measure. In fact the mobile classrooms stood for many years and remained until the school was demolished. The original façade was preserved and has now been created into two homes, with the rest of the site of the old school also being developed into new homes.

The new school building was completed for the 2001–02 school year, costing £14 million to build. In May 2016, defects were found in the building. A total of 440 pupils in S1 to S3 were decanted to schools in Stirling.

The current head teacher at the school is Ms Elaine Bannatyne. Senior Leadership Team: Claire Appelquist (Depute for Endrick House), Phil Slavin (Depute for Campsie House), David Braid (Depute for Lomond House)

== The School Houses ==
The school operates a three-house system. Campsie House (Green) is named for the Campsie Fells, a range of hills bordering the south east of the school's catchment area. Endrick House (Blue) is named for the Endrick Water, a river flowing through the school's catchment area. Lomond House (Red) is named for Loch Lomond, a loch at the western fringes of the school's catchment area.

== Notable alumni ==
- Tom Buchan (1931–1995) – Scottish poet, novelist and playwright/dramatist.
- Colin Gregor – Scottish Rugby 7s Captain
- Lauren Gray – Team GB 2014 Winter Olympics Curling bronze medallist
- Logan Gray – Scottish international curler
- Iain Turner – former Everton FC and Scotland 'B' international Goalkeeper
- Rory Kerr – Scottish International rugby union player
- Craig Mathieson (polar explorer)
- Ross Murdoch – Swimmer and Glasgow 2014 gold medallist
- Julian Smith – Member of Parliament for Skipton and Ripon and former Secretary of State for Northern Ireland
- Jenna Clark – Scottish football player at Liverpool FC Women
