= Port of Menteith railway station =

Disused railway station in Port of Menteith, Stirling

Port of Menteith

General information
- Location: Port of Menteith, Stirling; Scotland
- Coordinates: 56.137°N 4.2486°W
- Grid reference: NS603960
- Platforms: 2

Other information
- Status: Disused

History
- Original company: Forth and Clyde Junction Railway
- Pre-grouping: North British Railway
- Post-grouping: London and North Eastern Railway

Key dates
- 26 May 1856: Opened as Cardross
- 1 May 1858: Name changed to Port of Monteith
- June 1880: Name changed to Port of Menteith
- 1 October 1934: Closed
Location

Port of Menteith railway station served the village of Port of Menteith, Stirling, Scotland, from 1856 by 1934 on the Forth and Clyde Junction Railway.

== History ==
The station was opened as Cardross on 26 May 1856 by the Forth and Clyde Junction Railway. Its name was changed to Port of Monteith on 1 May 1858 to avoid confusion with the station of the same name. The station building was at the east end of the westbound platform. To the south was the goods yard and at the east end of the station was the signal box, which opened in 1893. The station's name changed again to Port of Menteith in June 1880. It closed on 1 October 1934.

| Preceding station | Disused railways | Following station |
|---|---|---|
| Buchlyvie; Line and station closed | Forth and Clyde Junction Railway | Ladylands Platform; Line and station closed |
