= Caldarvan railway station =

Disused railway station in Caldarvan, West Dunbartonshire

Caldarvan
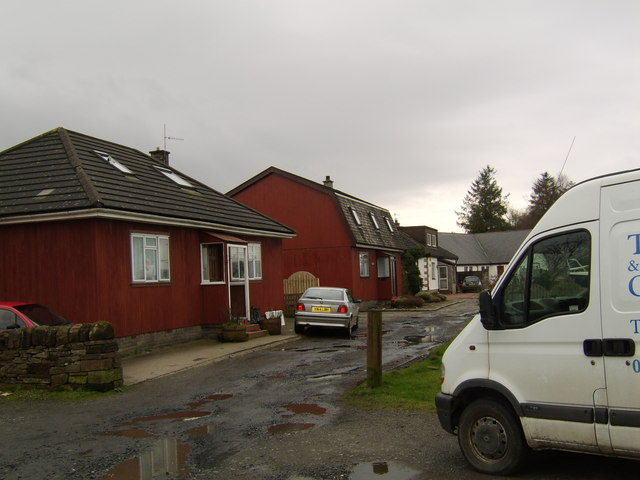
- The site of the station in 2007

General information
- Location: Caldarvan, Dunbartonshire; Scotland
- Coordinates: 56.0170°N 4.5061°W
- Grid reference: NS438832
- Platforms: 1

Other information
- Status: Disused

History
- Original company: Forth and Clyde Junction Railway
- Pre-grouping: North British Railway
- Post-grouping: London and North Eastern Railway

Key dates
- 26 May 1856: Opened as Kilmaronock
- January 1877: Name changed to Caldarvan
- 1 October 1934: Closed
Location

Caldarvan railway station served the estate of Caldarvan, in the historical county of Dunbartonshire, Scotland, from 1856 to 1934 on the Forth and Clyde Junction Railway.

== History ==
The station was opened as Kilmaronock on 26 May 1856 by the Forth and Clyde Junction Railway. To the south of the platform was a goods siding. To the northeast was the signal box and Gallangad Siding. The station's name was changed to Caldarvan in January 1877. It closed on 1 October 1934.

Preceding station	Disused railways	Following station
Jamestown; Line and station closed	Forth and Clyde Junction Railway	Drymen; Line and station closed
