= Jamestown railway station =

Disused railway station in Jamestown, West Dunbartonshire

Jamestown

General information
- Location: Jamestown, Dunbartonshire; Scotland
- Coordinates: 55.9974°N 4.5711°W
- Grid reference: NS397812
- Platforms: 2

Other information
- Status: Disused

History
- Original company: Forth and Clyde Junction Railway
- Pre-grouping: North British Railway
- Post-grouping: London and North Eastern Railway

Key dates
- 26 May 1856: Opened
- 1 October 1934: Closed to passengers
- 1964: Closed to goods
Location

Jamestown railway station served the village of Jamestown, in the historical county of Dunbartonshire, Scotland, from 1856 to 1964 on the Forth and Clyde Junction Railway.

== History ==
The station was opened on 26 May 1856 by the Forth and Clyde Junction Railway. To the east were two sidings, near the goods yard, which served Levenbank Print Works. A siding to the south was used to park a goods train. The platforms were eventually extended. A signal box was built in 1892. The station closed to passengers on 1 October 1934.

Preceding station	Disused railways	Following station
Balloch Central; Line and station closed	Forth and Clyde Junction Railway	Caldarvan; Line and station closed
