= Carola Macaulay =

British historian (1682 – unknown)

- Born: 19 February 1682; Kippen
- Occupation: Modiste, shopkeeper
- Spouse(s): Archibald Macauley
- Children: George Macaulay

Carola Macaulay born Carola Young (1682 – unknown) was a milliner who unusually was a woman trading in Edinburgh. She married Archibald Macauley and he was allowed to trade because he was married to Carola.

== Life ==
Macaulay was born in 1682 in Kippen which is a village between Balloch on Loch Lomond and the county town of Stirling. She was one of the three children born to Margaret (born MacFarlane) and Robert Young. Her father was Kippen's reverend minister.

She and Helen Gilchrist set up in the millinery business under the trading name of Carola Young & Co. They had a shop and they were allowed to trade in Edinburgh because they paid a fee to the Merchant Company of Edinburgh. She traded with Robert Blackwood who was an influential member of the company and a friend.

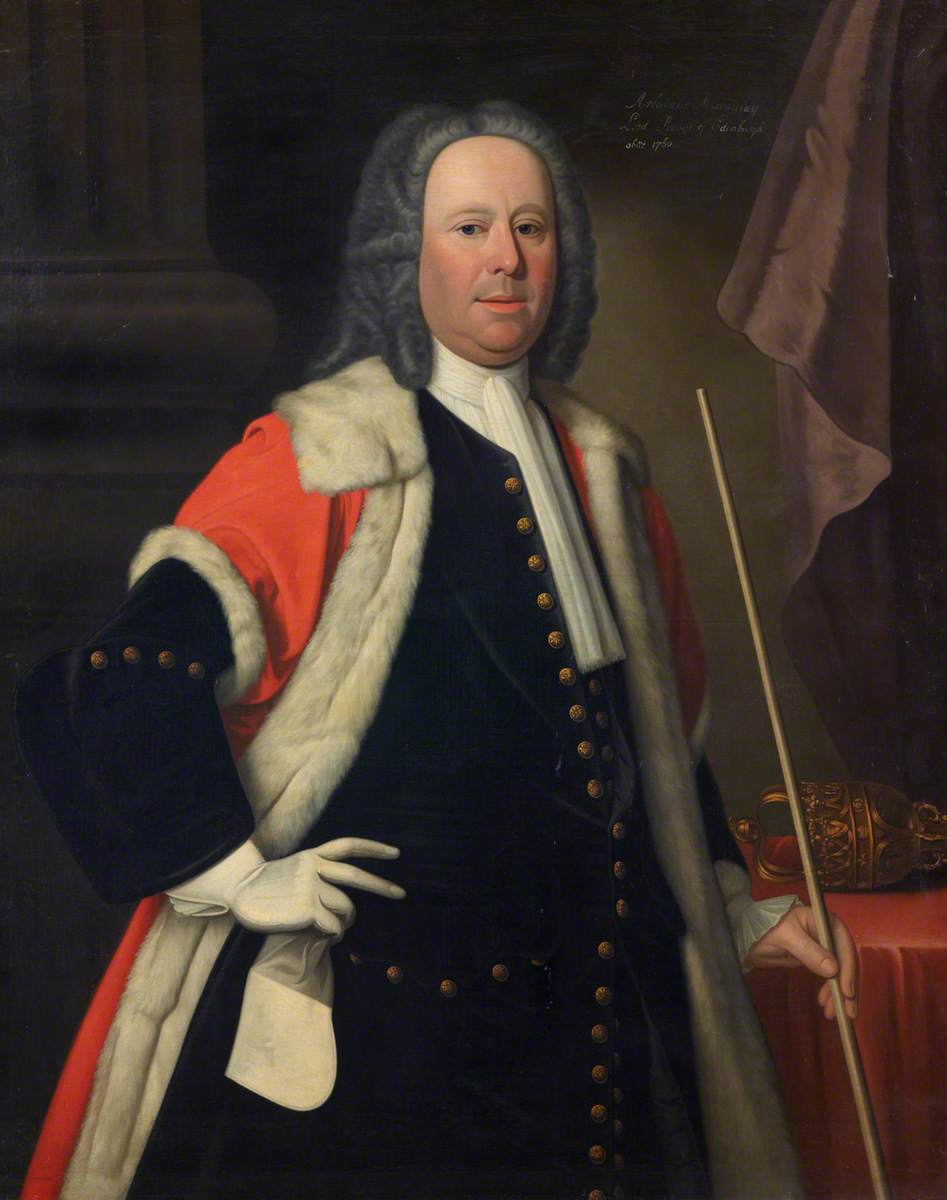
Archibald Macaulay 3 times Lord Provost of Edinburgh by George Chalmers

On 19 July 1710 Archibald Macaulay was made an Edinburgh burgess and guildsman, "gratis, for good services done" by Edinburgh Council. He was allowed to join the Merchant Company of Edinburgh and it was noted that his recent marriage to Carola Young carried weight with his application as Carola was a member of the company when she had married Archibald.

She and Archibald Macaulay had eight children. They were Protestants and they approved that the Protestant Hanoverians had been welcomed to the English crown. Carola continued to trade in her company in 1713 she was supplying a cambric bonnet and ruffles to Lady Panmure.

Archibald died in 1760 he had a large memorial in Greyfriars churchyard befitting a Lord Provost of the city. Carola is not mentioned on his memorial and her date of death is unknown.

== Private life ==
She and Alexander had eight children. Their first child Carola was born in 1712 and their second Archibald was born in 1713. Their fourth child George Macaulay who was born in 1716 became a midwife and their last child Anne was born in 1723.
