= Kippen railway station =

Disused railway station in Kippen, Stirling

Kippen
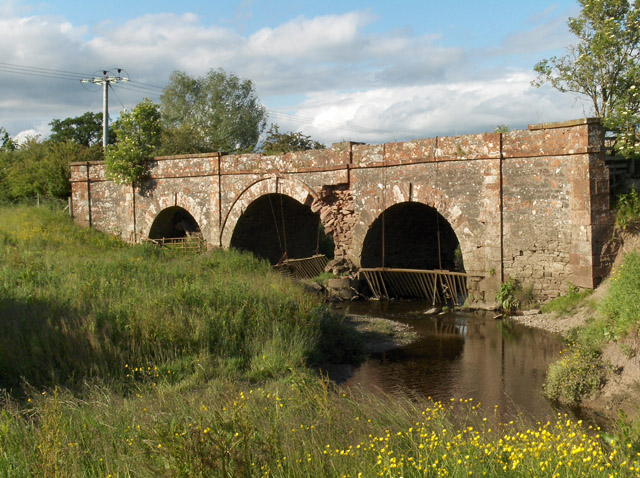
- The old railway bridge in 2006

General information
- Location: Kippen, Stirling; Scotland
- Coordinates: 56.1353°N 4.1499°W
- Grid reference: NS664957
- Platforms: 2

Other information
- Status: Disused

History
- Original company: Forth and Clyde Junction Railway
- Pre-grouping: North British Railway
- Post-grouping: London and North Eastern Railway

Key dates
- 26 May 1856: Opened
- 1 October 1934: Closed
Location

Kippen railway station co-served the village of Kippen, Stirling, Scotland, from 1856 to 1934 on the Forth and Clyde Junction Railway.

== History ==
The station was opened on 26 May 1856 by the Forth and Clyde Junction Railway. On the westbound platform is the station building, near the level crossing was the signal box and on the south side of the line is the goods yard. To the north was Boquan Tile Works, which was served by a siding. Despite its name, the station was situated a mile northeast of Kippen. The station closed on 1 October 1934.

| Preceding station | Disused railways | Following station |
|---|---|---|
| Fairfield Siding; Line and station closed | Forth and Clyde Junction Railway | Gargunnock; Line and station closed |
