= Gargunnock railway station =

Disused railway station in Gargunnock, Stirling

Coordinates: 56.1312°N 4.0697°W

Gargunnock
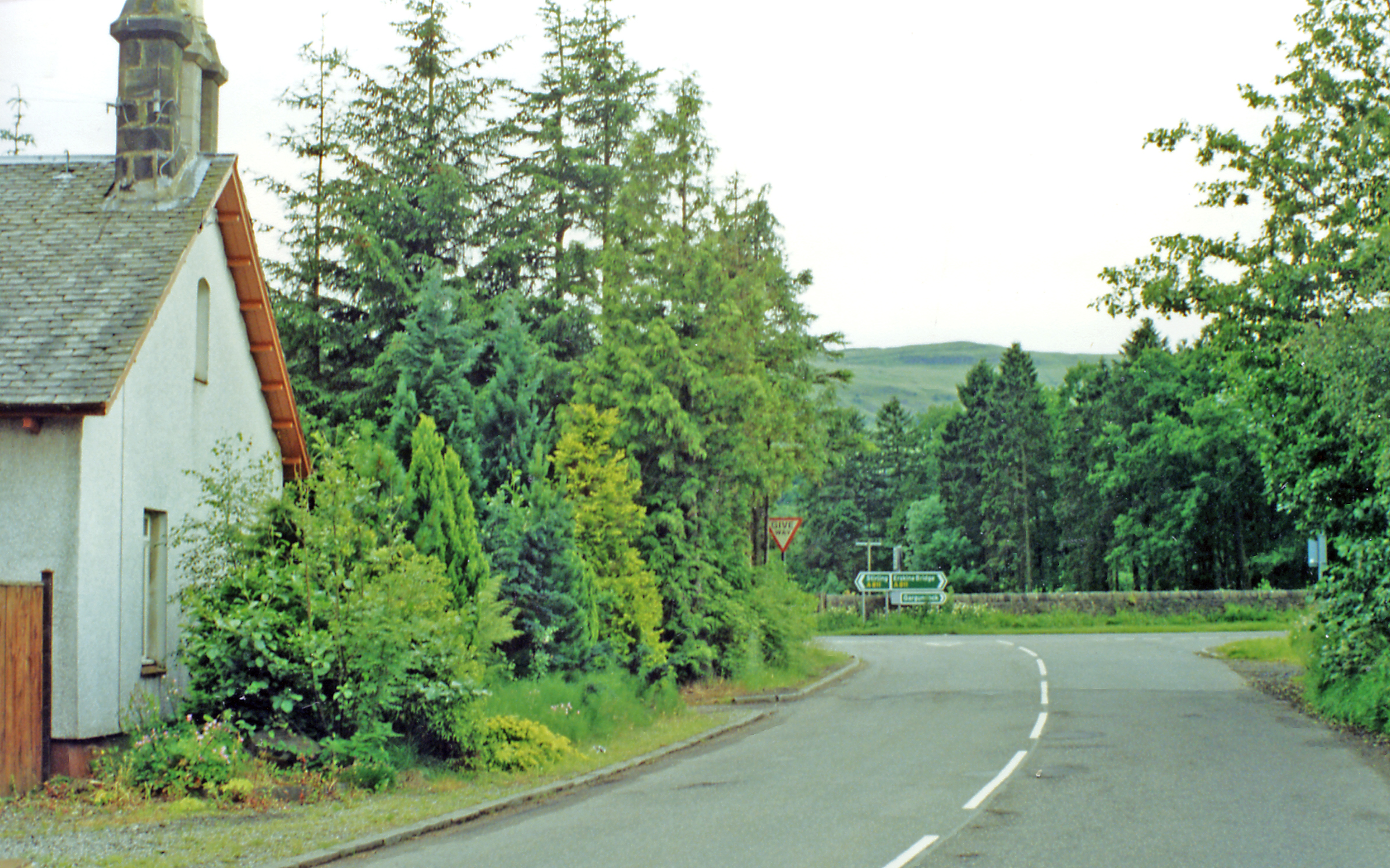
- The site of the station, looking south towards the A811, in 1997

General information
- Location: Gargunnock, Stirling; Scotland
- Platforms: 1 (initially); 2 (later added)

Other information
- Status: Disused

History
- Original company: Forth and Clyde Junction Railway
- Pre-grouping: North British Railway
- Post-grouping: London and North Eastern Railway

Key dates
- 26 May 1856: Opened
- 1 October 1934: Closed to passengers
- 5 October 1959: Closed to goods
Location

Gargunnock railway station served the village of Gargunnock, Stirling, Scotland, from 1856 to 1959 on the Forth and Clyde Junction Railway.

== History ==
The station was opened on 26 May 1856 by the Forth and Clyde Junction Railway. To the west was the goods yard and to the west of the level crossing was the signal box, which opened in 1892. On the north side of the line were sidings which served a sawmill. The station initially had only one platform but another was later added. It closed on 1 October 1934 and the signal box was downgraded to a ground frame shortly after. It closed to goods on 5 October 1959.

| Preceding station | Disused railways | Following station |
|---|---|---|
| Kippen; Line and station closed | Forth and Clyde Junction Railway | Stirling; Line closed, station open |
