= Balfron =

Coordinates: 56.071775°N 4.337256°W

Balfron: Scottish Gaelic: Both Fron
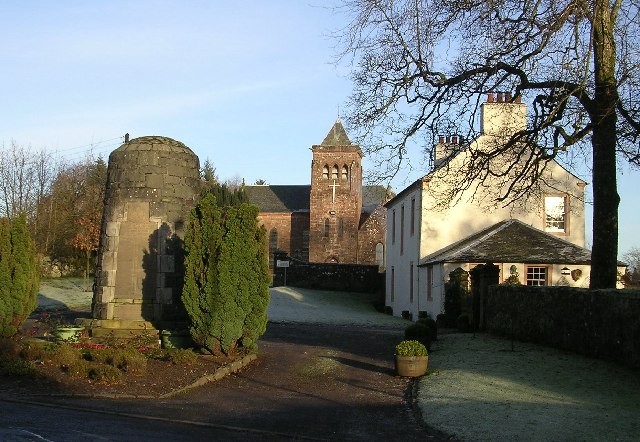
- The church and war memorial in Balfron

- Location within the Stirling council area
- Population: 2,140 (2020)
- OS grid reference: NS546890
- Civil parish: Balfron
- Council area: Stirling
- Lieutenancy area: Stirling and Falkirk
- Country: Scotland
- Sovereign state: United Kingdom
- Post town: GLASGOW
- Postcode district: G63 0xx
- Dialling code: 01360
- Police: Scotland
- Fire: Scottish
- Ambulance: Scottish
- UK Parliament: Stirling and Strathallan
- Scottish Parliament: Stirling

Balfron (Scottish Gaelic: Both Fron) is a village in the Stirling council area of Scotland. It is situated near Endrick Water on the A875 road, 18 miles (29 km) west of Stirling and 16 miles (26 km) north of Glasgow. Although a rural settlement, it lies within commuting distance of Glasgow, and serves as a dormitory settlement.

== History ==
The name means 'cottage of mourning' in Gaelic. This originates from a legend that the village was attacked by wolves, which stole children out of their homes. The first documented evidence of a settlement at the site dates from 1303, when it was referred to as "Buthbren".

Balfron has an ancient oak – the Clachan Oak – where William Wallace is said to have rested and later Rob Roy is supposed to have hidden. Rob Roy's sons abducted young widow-heiress Jean Key from nearby Edinbellie and forced her to marry Robin Oig MacGregor who was hanged for the crime.

Ballindalloch old house was a home of the Earl of Glencairn.

In 1789, when Robert Dunmore built Ballindalloch Cotton Works, he expanded the settlement from a hamlet of around 50 people to a bustling Industrial Revolution planned village with a population of almost 1,000 within a year.

As the cotton boom began to fail, the arrival of the Forth and Clyde Junction Railway transformed Balfron into a popular holiday resort. Testament to this was the presence of the Tontine Hotel, which stood at the corner of Buchanan Street and Cotton Street. The plethora of no longer required ex-army vehicles after World War I began the village's connection with buses which still survives today.

Balfron Tower, a high-rise residential building in London designed by Ernő Goldfinger, was named after the village in 1967.

== Facilities ==
Balfron has shops, a health centre, a village hall and a secondary school (Balfron High School). The town also contains a fire station, garage, ambulance depot, police station, primary school, bowling green and an 18-hole golf course.

The game of golf is not a new tradition in Balfron. There had been a 9-hole course at the top of the village for many years until, in 1939, Balfron Golf Club was dissolved and the land given up for agricultural use during the 2nd World War. In 1991 Balfron Golf Society was formed to re-create a nine-hole course on the site of the original one. A 9-hole course opened in 1994 and in 2001 was extended to 18 holes.

The Secondary School (Balfron High School) opened in 2001, replacing a 1960s-era building which had previously acted as the secondary school. The new school was built as a public-private partnership (PPP) with the company Jarvis plc under the PPP policy of the Scottish Executive which was then run by the Scottish Labour Party. It and the local primary school, which has nursery provision, are located in separate buildings on the same campus and is signposted in the village as "Balfron Campus". The old school, which originated from the 19th century and was still used as classroom space until 2001 has been converted into two homes. Jarvis, the company that managed the school under the PPP arrangements, went into administration in March 2010. The administrator appointed by Jarvis approached the council with an offer from SGP Ltd to take over both the PFI (private finance initiative) contract and the facilities management contract. As part of the PPP agreement the leisure facilities of the school are open to the public outwith school hours.

Balfron Church, built in 1832, is situated in the settlement and shares a minister with the neighbouring parish of Fintry. The catholic community is served by St Anthony's, which shares a priest with St Kessog's, in Strathblane. Strathendrick Baptist Church is also based in Balfron and meets at McLintock Hall.

There are eight listed buildings in Balfron, and a further fifteen in the area around the village.

Many youth groups work in the village including Duke of Edinburgh Award Scheme, scouts and guides.

Balfron Rovers Football Club are a Scottish association football club based in Balfron. As of 2014, they play in the Forth and Endrick Football League.

== Transport ==
Balfron railway station was opened to serve the town in 1856. It served as a junction between the Forth and Clyde Junction Railway and the Strathendrick and Aberfoyle Railway. The station closed in 1951.

The main road in Balfron is the A875. Local bus services are provided by McGill's Scotland East.

== Communication ==
The Balfron telephone exchange serves (approx) 970 residential premises and 55 non-residential premises.

Internet Broadband services are available, but BT Openreach have not upgraded the Balfron exchange since it was updated for ADSL Max Broadband in March 2006. 21CN WBC and fibre services are not available from this exchange. There is no Local Loop Unbundling (LLU) operator presence.

== People from Balfron ==
- Alexander 'Greek' Thomson (1817 – 1875) was born in Balfron to a father who was a bookkeeper at Ballindalloch Mill. He became an eminent Glaswegian architect and architectural theorist and a pioneer in sustainable building.
- George Thomson (1819 – 1878), brother of Alexander Thomson, was born in Balfron. After an early career as an architect became a baptist missionary in Limbe, Cameroon (then known as "Victoria"), where he combined his religious activities with a passion for botany. An epiphytic orchid of the genus Pachystoma was named Pachystoma thomsonianum in his honour.
- Harold and Frank Barnwell, known as the Barnwell Brothers, were also from Balfron. They began their love affair with gliders and planes in the grounds of Elcho House, Balfron and after a subsequent trip to meet the Wright Brothers in America they returned to Scotland and began building innovative designs in Bridge of Allan.
- Sir William Bilsland (1847–1921) was born at Ballat, near Balfron, of forebears who had been for several centuries farmers in the neighbouring parish of Kilmaronock. He joined his brother, James, who ran a small family bakery in Anderston, Glasgow. He acquired 12 vans, as well as horses and carts, to distribute Bilslands bread all over Scotland. He later acquired other firms including Gray and Dunn biscuit manufacturers in 1912. William later became Lord Provost of Glasgow and was created a baronet in 1907.
- Sir Robert Muir, FRS, FRSE, FRCP, FRCPE, RFPSG (5 July 1864 – 30 March 1959) was a Scottish physician and pathologist who carried out pioneering work in immunology, and was one of the leading figures in medical research in Glasgow in the early 20th century. Born in Balfron, he was the son of a minister.
- Prof George Eason FRSE (1930-1999), Professor of Mathematics at Strathclyde University, lived with his family in Balfron.
- Dr Brian Douglas Keighley was a general practitioner (GP) who practiced in Balfron for 40 years, and was the chair of the Scottish Council of the British Medical Association (BMA) from 2009 to December 2014.
- Douglas N. Muir was the Senior Curator of Philately at The Postal Museum in London, formerly the British Postal Museum & Archive and a signatory to the Book of Scottish Philatelists and the Roll of Distinguished Philatelists. Muir was born in Balfron.
- Brian McGinley was rated one of Scotland's top referees and was on both the FIFA and UEFA lists.
- Lauren Gray (born 3 November 1991) is a Scottish curler. She won a gold medal at the 2013 World Championships for Scotland, and a bronze medal at the 2014 Winter Olympics for Great Britain. She won a gold medal at the 2017 European Championships.
- Logan Gray (born 23 June 1986), brother of Lauren Gray, is a Scottish former curler. He is a two-time World Junior curling bronze medallist.
