= Balfron railway station =

Disused railway station in Kirkintilloch, Scotland

Balfron
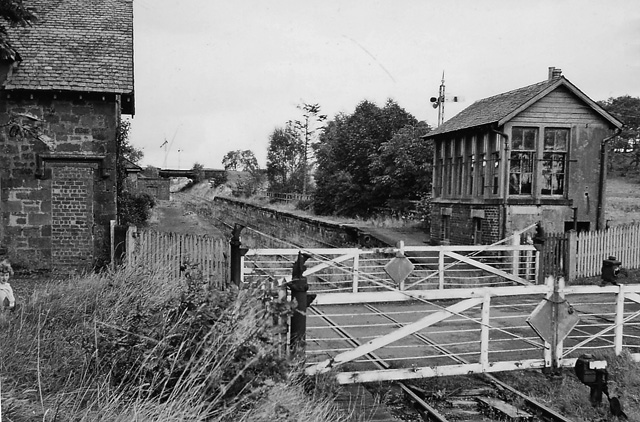
- Balfron railway station in 1961

General information
- Location: Kirkintilloch; Scotland
- Coordinates: 56.074°N 4.375°W
- Platforms: 2

Other information
- Status: Disused

History
- Original company: Strathendrick and Aberfoyle Railway
- Pre-grouping: North British Railway
- Post-grouping: London and North Eastern Railway

Key dates
- 26 May 1856: Station opens
- 1 October 1951: Station closes
Location

Balfron railway station was a railway station that served the village of Balfron in Scotland. The station was served by trains on the Strathendrick and Aberfoyle Railway and the Forth and Clyde Junction Railway, both of which closed in the 1950s.

The station was about 2 miles (3 km) away from the village that it served, therefore passengers and goods had to be transported by horse and cart to the village. A hamlet known as Balfron Station has since grown up around the site of the former station.

== History ==
Opened by the Edinburgh and Glasgow (Forth and Clyde Junction Railway), and absorbed into the North British Railway, it became part of the London and North Eastern Railway during the Grouping of 1923. It passed on to the Scottish Region of British Railways on nationalisation in 1948.

The station was closed by British Railways in 1951.

Preceding station	Historical railways	Following station
Gartness; Line and station closed	North British Railway; Forth and Clyde Junction Railway	Buchlyvie; Line and station closed
Killearn; Line and station closed	North British Railway; Strathendrick and Aberfoyle Railway	Buchlyvie; Line and station closed

== Hamlet ==
Since the station's closure in 1951, a rural settlement has grown up around the former site of the station. The hamlet is served by Balfron Primary School and Balfron High School in the village of Balfron, 2 miles away.
