= Gartness =

Coordinates: 56.052°N 4.407°W

Gartness: Scottish Gaelic: Gart an Easa
- Location within the Stirling council area
- OS grid reference: NS501869
- Civil parish: Killearn
- Council area: Stirling
- Lieutenancy area: Stirling and Falkirk
- Country: Scotland
- Sovereign state: United Kingdom
- Post town: Glasgow
- Postcode district: G63
- Dialling code: 01360
- Police: Scotland
- Fire: Scottish
- Ambulance: Scottish
- UK Parliament: Stirling and Strathallan
- Scottish Parliament: Stirling

Gartness is a hamlet in Stirling, Scotland. It is located 1.8 miles/2.9 km from Killearn and 3.1 miles/5 km from Drymen. Most pupils attend Killearn Primary School and senior pupils attend Balfron High School. The Endrick Water passes through the hamlet.

Gartness Castle, to the south of Gartness, was once the home of John Napier.

== Etymology ==
The name derives from the Scottish Gaelic Gart an Easa, which means "enclosed field by the stream".

== Facilities ==
Whilst the hamlet has no facilities, there is an honesty shop serving walkers on the famous West Highland Way, and Drymen Camping, a campsite along the road towards Drymen, also directly on the trail.
