= Jordanhill School =

School in Glasgow

Location
- 45 Chamberlain Road; Jordanhill, Glasgow, G13 1SP; Scotland; 55.884578°N 4.333758°W

Information
- Type: Grant-aided school Laboratory school
- Motto: Ad summa nitor (Strive for the Highest)
- Established: 1920
- Founder: Jordanhill College of Education
- Rector: John Anderson
- Gender: Co-educational
- Age: 4 to 19
- Enrolment: 594 Secondary, 462 Primary
- Houses: Crawford, Montgomerie, Smith and St. John
Colour
- Oversight: Scottish Government
- Website: www.jordanhill.glasgow.sch.uk

Jordanhill School, located in Jordanhill, Glasgow, educates children from age 4–19. It was formerly run by Jordanhill College of Education as its demonstration school, and was previously known as Jordanhill College School.

Uniquely among Scottish schools, it is funded directly by the Scottish Government (rather than through the local authority, in this case Glasgow City Council).

The school consists of a primary department and a secondary department. In the primary, P1 and P2 have three classes of twenty-two pupils each while P3–P7 have two classes of thirty-three. Pupils in upper Primary spend up to 60% of their week working in the Secondary department. The secondary school takes in an additional thirty-three pupils in S1 to bring the number per year up to 99. The school is categorised as non-denominational.

The school is state-funded by direct grant from the Scottish Government, and is non fee-paying. The school catchment area encompasses predominantly owner-occupied housing in West Glasgow. The school regularly records among the best exam results in Scotland.

== History ==
The college was an out-of-town location that sought to merge two teacher training centres that were heavily influenced by education training pioneer David Stow, a Glasgow merchant. These were the Free Church Normal Seminary and the Dundas Vale Normal Seminary, two of the earliest teacher training colleges in Scotland. This merger was a government-sponsored initiative of 1905, when it was decided that teacher training should be taken away from the church and placed under the control of a provincial committee.

The site of the college – and now the school – was on the old Jordanhill Estate grounds. The old Jordanhill House was demolished around 1915, with the Glasgow Provincial Committee buying the land to build their new college, though the plot had been for sale since 1911. The school buildings were completed in 1921, although the school was founded a year earlier, in 1920. Headmasters include Andrew Walker (1891–1974), who led Jordanhill College School from 1936 to 1956, having earlier served from 1921 to 1932 as a mathematics and science master and – initially – the only teacher in the new secondary department, formed in 1921 with twenty pupils. His successor, William T. Branston (1915–1984), at the time of his 1956 appointment was the youngest headteacher in Scotland and whose tenure – Branston retired in December 1980 – saw successive challenges, from sustained upheaval in Scottish school curricula to a serious bid to shut Jordanhill College School in 1969. (It survived, the controversy concluding in December 1970, with the school adjusting readily to non-selective and non fee-paying status.)

A former naval officer and veteran of the Second World War, committed to good works from amateur dramatics through the YMCA (he chaired the Glasgow organisation) to the Scottish National Orchestra Chorus and influential lay service in the Church of Scotland, William Branston was to most pupils an 'astonishingly remote, God-like figure'. He enforced regular religious observance – such as morning assembly – and the school was noted through the 1970s for its rigid uniform code and highly conservative, rote-learning traditional teaching methods, notably in arithmetic and English grammar.

The school remained under control of the College until 1988, when it switched to its current directly funded status. This move caused controversy at the time, with various other options considered (including becoming a Council-run establishment or, indeed, a fee-paying school). In the end a combination of a spirited "Save Our School" campaign spearheaded by Branston's successor, Alistair Cram and ingenious political machinations led to the school becoming directly funded by the Scottish Office (and later the Scottish Executive). Cram resigned in 1988, and in 1989 'College' was dropped from the school name, at the insistence of Jordanhill College.

In 1993 the college merged with the University of Strathclyde, with the Jordanhill Campus serving as home to the Education Faculty. The campus has fallen into disrepair, and is being redeveloped as new housing by CALA Homes Ltd.

== Headmasters/rectors ==
- E. J. V. Brown (1920–1923)
- Tod Ritchie (1923–1931)
- William Montgomerie (1931–1936)
- Andrew Walker (1936–1956)
- William Branston (1956–1980)
- Alistair Cram (1981–1988)
- William Bedborough (1989–1997)
- Paul W. Thomson (1997–2020)
- John D. Anderson (2020–present)

== Modernisation ==
An addition in recent decades was the Macmillan Building, a small building behind the school; housing a classroom used for RE and additional sports changing facilities. In early 2005 the school acquired the former Laurel Park games hall on Anniesland Road, in partnership with the Glasgow Academy. Work on the multi-million modern two-storey "South Campus" was completed in mid-2009. It accommodates mainly secondary school classes and some upper primary classes. The building covers four departments: art, mathematics, modern languages, and social sciences. It is connected to the original "North Campus" via a walkway parallel to the sports pitch. The sports pitch was upgraded from blaze to artificial grass and a multi-use games area (MUGA) pitch around the same time; which has now been converted to artificial grass.

As of 2023 the houses in this school's catchment zone are the most expensive in consideration of any Scottish school's catchment zone, with the exception of those in East Lothian and Edinburgh.

== Miscellaneous ==
The school's Latin motto, beneath its coat of arms is "Ad summa nitor", which translates to "Strive for the highest".

The school is categorised as non-denominational, but students are required to attend three Christian Church services at the end of each term at Jordanhill Parish Church.

In 2015, the school controversially denied a place to a child with complex additional support needs. The school claimed, due to its unique method of funding, it did not have suitable equipment for the child.

The railway station closest to the school is Jordanhill railway station.

The school was used as a filming location for Trainspotting, the film of the 1993 Irvine Welsh novel. The school has also been used for the filming of BBC dramas; Shetland in 2012 and 2016 and Single Father in 2010.

== Notable pupils ==
- Gavin Arneil (1923–2018), paediatric nephrologist.
- Jen Beattie (born 1991), retired international footballer.
- Johnnie Beattie (born 1985), international rugby union player.
- Tom Buchan (1931–1995), Scottish poet, novelist and playwright/dramatist.
- Justin Currie (born 1964), main songwriter of the band Del Amitri.
- Corrie Dick (born 1990), musician.
- Eric Forth (1944–2006), Conservative MP and MEP.
- Ziggy Gordon (born 1993), professional footballer.
- Aaron Hickey (born 2002), international footballer for Brentford and the Scottish National Team.
- Iain Macintyre (1924–2008), endocrinologist.
- Iain Smith (born 1949), film producer.
