= Evelyn Tweed =

Scottish National Party politician

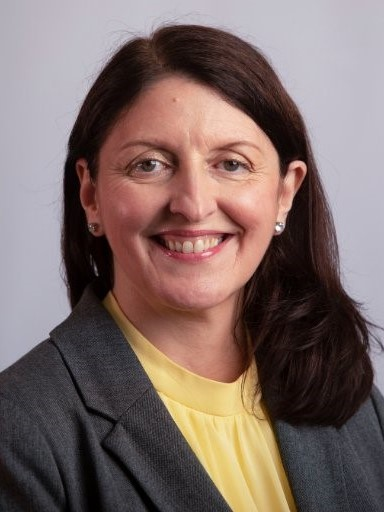
- Official portrait, 2021

Member of the Scottish Parliament for Stirling
- In office 6 May 2021 – 9 April 2026
- Preceded by: Bruce Crawford
- Succeeded by: Alyn Smith

Personal details
- Born: Evelyn Maureen Tweed; 1967 (age 58–59) Ayr, Scotland
- Party: Scottish National Party
- Spouse: Ahsan Khan
- Children: 2
- Education: Paisley College of Technology; Heriot-Watt University

Evelyn Tweed is a Scottish politician who has been the Member of the Scottish Parliament (MSP) for Stirling from 2021 to 2026. A member of the Scottish National Party (SNP), she was a councillor in Stirling for Trossachs and Teith ward from 2017 to 2022.

== Early life and career ==
Tweed was born in Ayr, in the west of Scotland. She obtained her first degree at the Paisley College of Technology (now the University of the West of Scotland) and then gained a post graduate housing qualification from Heriot-Watt University. She then worked for various housing associations, gaining senior roles mainly involving building social housing. Tweed was a member of the Board of the Chartered Institute of Housing Scotland from 2007 to 2009.

== Political career ==
In the 2017 Scottish local elections, Tweed was elected to the Stirling council, representing the Trossachs and Teith ward. She became the council's public safety commission convener following the resignation of Maureen Bennison.

In June 2022 she apologised after being photographed holding the flag of the ultra-nationalist group Siol nan Gaidheal.

=== Member of the Scottish Parliament ===
Tweed was selected as the SNP's candidate for the Stirling constituency in the 2021 Scottish Parliament election. After a successful campaign, she succeeded retiring MSP Bruce Crawford, as the MSP for Stirling. She is the Deputy Convener of the Education, Children and Young People Committee.

In February 2025, Tweed was reported to be on an all-female "hit list" of SNP MSPs that were to be asked to stand down from the Scottish Parliament to make room for ex-MPs who had lost their seats in the 2024 general election. The alleged list was reported to have been drawn up at Stephen Flynn's direction by Aberdeenshire North and Moray East MP Seamus Logan. On 13 February, Tweed announced that she would not stand again for re-election.

== Personal life ==
Tweed lives in Stirling with her husband, and their children.

Scottish Parliament
Preceded by Bruce Crawford	Member of the Scottish Parliament for Stirling; 2021–2026	Succeeded by Alyn Smith
