= Tom Buchan (poet) =

Scottish poet, novelist and playwright (1931–1995)

Tom Buchan (19 June 1931 – 18 October 1995) Scottish poet, novelist and playwright/dramatist.

== Early life ==
He was born in Glasgow on 19 June 1931. His father was a Protestant minister. He was educated at Jordanhill College School, Balfron High School, and Aberdeen Grammar School. He then went to the University of Glasgow where in 1953 he was awarded an MA (Hons) in English literature.

== Career ==
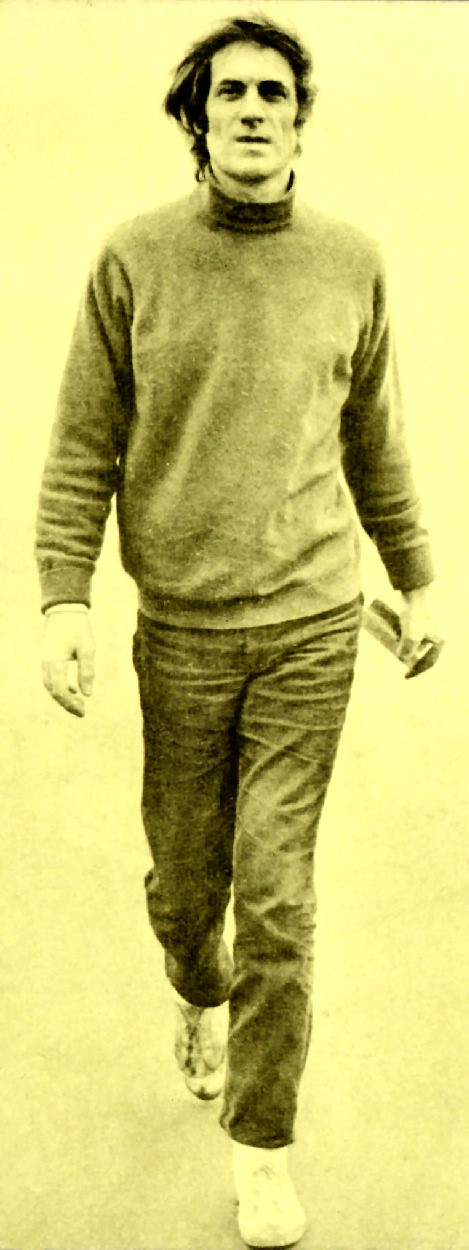
Tom Buchan (1972)

After University he taught at Denny High School. He joined the Iona Community (1956-1960) and through them, he was employed as a lecturer at the University of Madras and then as a Warden at Community House, Glasgow. He returned to teaching at Denny and Irvine Royal Academy before becoming a senior lecturer in English and Drama at Clydebank Technical College. From 1971 he was a freelance writer and playwright, a director of the Craigmillar Festival in Edinburgh (1973), Dumbarton Festival (1975) and the final editor of the Scottish International, a Scottish arts magazine.

He worked with Billy Connolly in 1972 on ‘The Great Northern Welly Boot Show’. He was given a Scottish Arts Council award in 1969 and 1970, and started to publish his own poetry: Dolphins at Cochin (1969), Exorcism (1973), and Poems 1969–72. His play 'Happy Landings' was performed at the Traverse Theatre in Edinburgh, 'Tell Charlie Thanks for the Truss' (1972) and 'Knox and Mary' (1973).

He was associated with the Findhorn Foundation and lived for many years round the Moray Firth, where he died on 18 October 1995, in a wooded area near Forres.

He was married to Emma Chapman in 1962; they had two sons and a daughter.

== Poetry ==
Ikons. Madras, Tambaram Press. 1958.

Dolphins at Cochin. London: Barrie and Rockliff-Cresset Press. New York: Hill and Wang. 1969.

Exorcism. Glasgow: Midnight Press. 1972.

Poems 1969–1972. Edinburgh: Poni Press. 1972.

Forwards. Glasgow: Glasgow, Print Studio Press. 1978.

== Plays ==
Tell Charlie Thanks for the Truss (produced Edinburgh, 1972).

The Great Northern Welly Boot Show. Lyrics by Billy Connolly, music by Tom McGrath (produced Edinburgh and London, 1972).

Knox and Mary (produced Edinburgh, 1972).

Over the Top (produced Edinburgh, 1979).

Bunker (produced Findhorn, Moray, 1980).

== Novel ==
Makes You Feel Great. Edinburgh: Poni Press. 1971.
