= Bruce Crawford =

Scottish politician (born 1955)

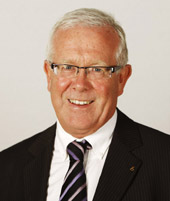

Cabinet Secretary for Parliamentary Business and Government Strategy
- In office 19 May 2011 – 5 September 2012
- First Minister: Alex Salmond
- Preceded by: Margaret Curran (2007)
- Succeeded by: Michael Russell (2018)

Minister for Parliamentary Business
- In office 17 May 2007 – 19 May 2011
- First Minister: Alex Salmond
- Preceded by: George Lyon
- Succeeded by: Brian Adam

Member of the Scottish Parliament for Stirling
- In office 3 May 2007 – 5 May 2021
- Preceded by: Sylvia Jackson
- Succeeded by: Evelyn Tweed

Member of the Scottish Parliament for Mid Scotland and Fife
- In office 6 May 1999 – 2 April 2007

Personal details
- Born: 16 February 1955 (age 71) Perth, Scotland
- Party: Scottish National Party
- Spouse: Jacqueline Crawford

Robert Hardie Bruce Crawford (born 16 February 1955) is a Scottish National Party (SNP) politician who served as Cabinet Secretary for Parliamentary Business and Government Strategy from 2011 to 2012, having held the junior ministerial position of Minister for Parliamentary Business from 2007 to 2011. Crawford served as the Member of the Scottish Parliament (MSP) for Stirling from 2007 to 2021, having previously represented the Mid Scotland and Fife region 1999–2007.

== Background ==
Crawford was born in Perth. Prior to entering politics, he was a human resource manager with the Scottish Office.

== Political career ==
=== Perth Council ===
Crawford served as councillor for Kinross on Perth and Kinross District Council from 1988 to 1996 and on Perth and Kinross Council from 1995 to 2001. Crawford was also Leader of Perth and Kinross Council from 1995 to 1999.

=== In opposition in Scottish Parliament ===
He was elected to the Scottish Parliament to represent Mid Scotland and Fife at the 1999 election. In his role as Transport Spokesperson, Crawford lodged a no confidence motion in Transport Minister Sarah Boyack in 2001 over the awarding of trunk road maintenance contracts to private companies rather than local authorities. This motion was defeated by a majority of 37.

He was re-elected in 2003. He was appointed Chief Whip by John Swinney. He ran Swinney's campaign to be re-elected as SNP National Convenor when he was challenged by Dr. Bill Wilson in late 2003. Following the adoption of a new constitution by the SNP in 2004, Crawford was appointed as the SNP's Business Convener.

=== Government Minister ===
At the 2007 Scottish Parliament election, Crawford gained the Stirling seat from the Labour Party. The SNP's combined electoral success put them in minority government, and Crawford was appointed to the junior ministerial position of Minister for Parliamentary Business, a position that he held until the end of the parliamentary session.

Crawford was returned to the Stirling constituency in the 2011 election. On 19 May 2011, Crawford became the Cabinet Secretary for Parliamentary Business and Government Strategy, departing from this role on 5 September 2012.

Crawford was Convener of the Referendum (Scotland) Bill Committee 25 October 2012 – 29 October 2014 and then Convener of the Devolution (Further Powers) Committee 29 October 2014 – 23 March 2016.

=== Return to backbenches ===
Crawford was re-elected in the 2016 election. On 18 February 2020, he announced that he would stand down as an MSP at the 2021 election.

== Personal life ==
Crawford and his wife, Jacqueline, have three sons.

== See also ==
- Government of the 3rd Scottish Parliament
- Government of the 4th Scottish Parliament

Scottish Parliament
Preceded by Sylvia Jackson	Member of the Scottish Parliament for Stirling; 2007–2021	Succeeded by Evelyn Tweed
