= Alyn Smith =

Scottish National Party politician (born 1973)

Alyn Smith MSP
- Official portrait, 2026

Minister for Innovation, Technology and Tertiary Education
- Incumbent
- Assumed office 8 September 2026
- First Minister: John Swinney
- Preceded by: Ben Macpherson

Member of the Scottish Parliament for Stirling
- Incumbent
- Assumed office 7 May 2026
- Preceded by: Evelyn Tweed
- Majority: 7,442 (23.2%)

Member of Parliament for Stirling
- In office 12 December 2019 – 30 May 2024
- Preceded by: Stephen Kerr
- Succeeded by: Constituency abolished

Member of the European Parliament for Scotland
- In office 10 June 2004 – 12 December 2019
- Preceded by: Neil MacCormick
- Succeeded by: Heather Anderson

President of the European Free Alliance group
- In office 11 June 2019 – 13 December 2019
- Preceded by: Josep Maria Terricabras i Nogueras
- Succeeded by: Oriol Junqueras

SNP Westminster portfolios
- 2022–2024: Europe and EU Accession
- 2020–2022: Foreign Affairs

Personal details
- Born: 15 September 1973 (age 53) Glasgow, Scotland
- Party: Scottish National Party
- Education: University of Leeds; Nottingham Trent University
- Profession: Lawyer
- Website: alynsmith.scot

Alyn Edward Smith (born 15 September 1973) is a Scottish politician. A member of the Scottish National Party (SNP), he is the Minister for Innovation, Technology and Tertiary Education, having been a Member of the Scottish Parliament (MSP) for Stirling since May 2026. He previously served as the Member of Parliament (MP) for Stirling from 2019 until 2024 when he unsuccessfully stood for the Stirling and Strathallan seat. He also served as a Member of the European Parliament (MEP) for Scotland from 2004 to 2019. He served as SNP Westminster Spokesperson for Europe and EU Accession since December 2022.

== Early life and education ==
Smith was born in Glasgow on 15 September 1973 to Jane and Edward Smith. He grew up between Scotland and Saudi Arabia.

After returning to the UK in 1986, he studied law and European law at the University of Leeds, receiving his LLB (Hons) degree in 1994. He spent a year studying on the Erasmus Programme at the University of Heidelberg in Germany. He gained a master's degree in European studies from the College of Europe in Natolin, Warsaw in 1995. The following year, he graduated from Nottingham Law School at Nottingham Trent University, and received a Diploma in Legal Practice. For a year he taught English in India and worked with Scotland Europa in Brussels.

Smith later moved to London, where he qualified as a lawyer with commercial solicitors law firm Clifford Chance, working with them from 1997 to 1999. He was with another solicitors firm, Anderson Strathern, from 2000 to 2002. Smith was a director of Turning Point Scotland from 2011 to 2015, and a trustee of LGBT Youth Scotland from 2012 to 2017. He is Honorary Vice President of the Scottish Society for the Prevention of Cruelty to Animals (SSPCA).

== Initial political career ==
=== European Parliament ===
Smith was elected for the first time – as Scotland's youngest MEP – in the 2004 European Parliament election. He was re-elected three times at the 2009, 2014 and 2019 European Parliament elections. He sat as a member of the currently seven-strong European Free Alliance Group in the Parliament, which retains its own identity within the joint Green-European Free Alliance Group.

He was a member of the SNP's National Executive Committee until he was voted out in November 2020.

In his first two terms in the European Parliament, Smith served as a full member of the Committee on Agriculture and Rural Development winning the coveted Scottish Farmer Magazine award for "Outstanding Contribution to Scottish Agriculture" at the Highland Show in 2009.

Following his re-election in 2014, Smith served as a full member of the Foreign Affairs Committee, remaining a voice in agriculture as alternate member of the Agriculture and Rural Development Committee. He was also a full member of both the Delegation for relations with the Arabian Peninsula, and the Delegation for relations with Iraq.

On 27 March 2019, Smith gave a speech to the European Parliament where he argued that Brexit was causing Scotland to be removed from the EU against the will of the Scottish people and claimed that Scottish independence could provide a means for Scotland to rejoin the EU. Many newspaper headlines cited his closing line: "I'm asking you to leave a light on so we can find our way home."

On Sky News in May 2019, Smith claimed that the Brexit Party was "a shell company that's a money laundering front". After the party's chairman threatened legal action, Smith apologised unreservedly and admitted that he had no evidence for his allegation, made a major contribution to the party chairman's legal costs and made a donation to charity. It is alleged that Smith's donation was paid by the SNP out of member's party donations.

All new EU accession states must commit to joining the euro as a condition of membership and in May 2019 Smith said that Scotland should be "open" to joining the euro if the country becomes independent. In 2021 Smith said an independent Scotland should hold a referendum on the issue. "We would want to participate an economic & monetary union for the macroeconomic stability," Smith told La Repubblica. "The adoption of the euro should be put to the people in a referendum." He also accepted that the SNP's proposals would mean a hard border with England: "The border of Carlisle will be an external border of the European Union, customs union and single market. We've got obligations of policing that, of course."

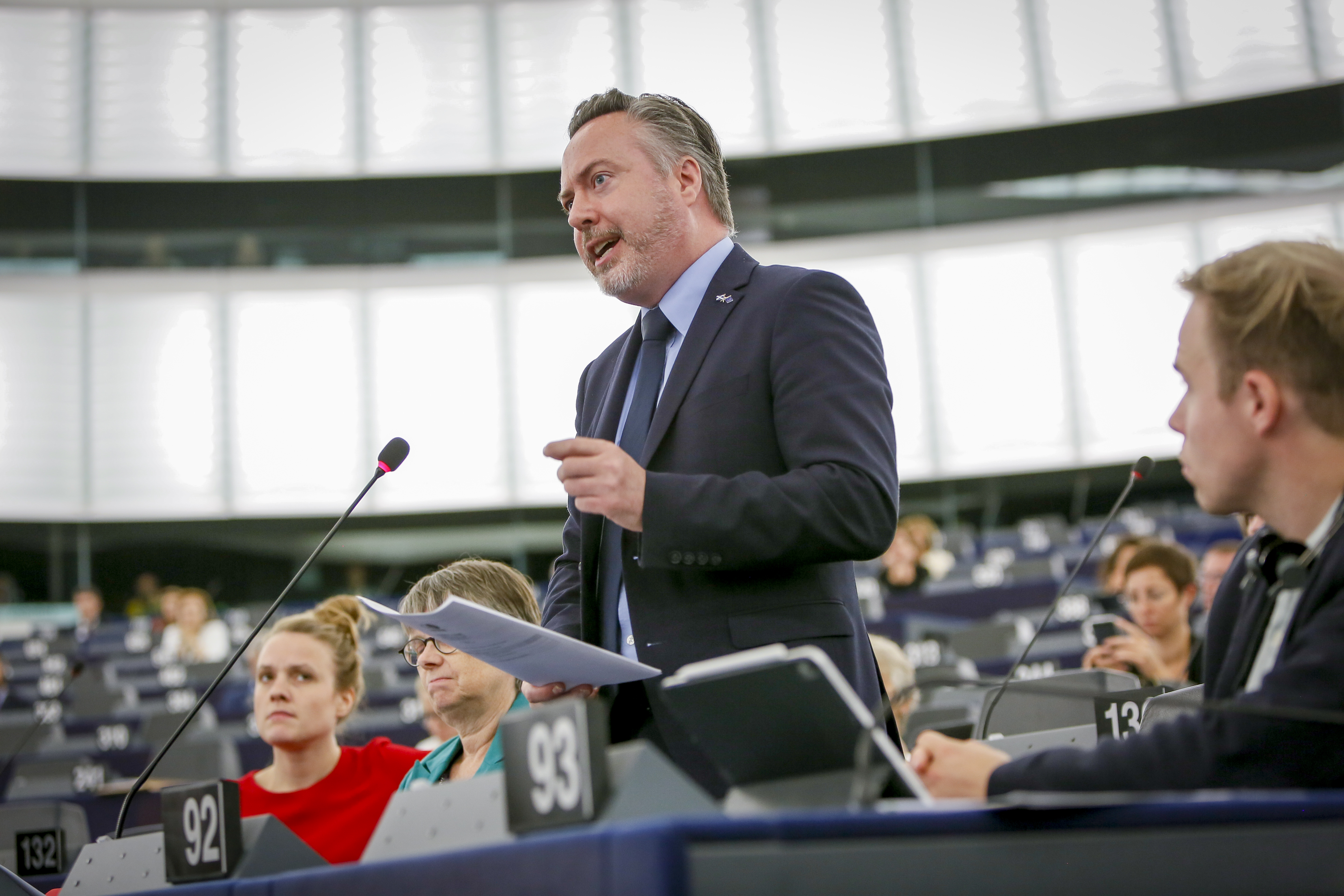
Smith speaking at the European Parliament on 18 September 2019.

Following the election, Smith became President of the European Free Alliance group in the European Parliament, and by holding that office, First Vice-president of the Greens/EFA Group.

=== House of Commons ===
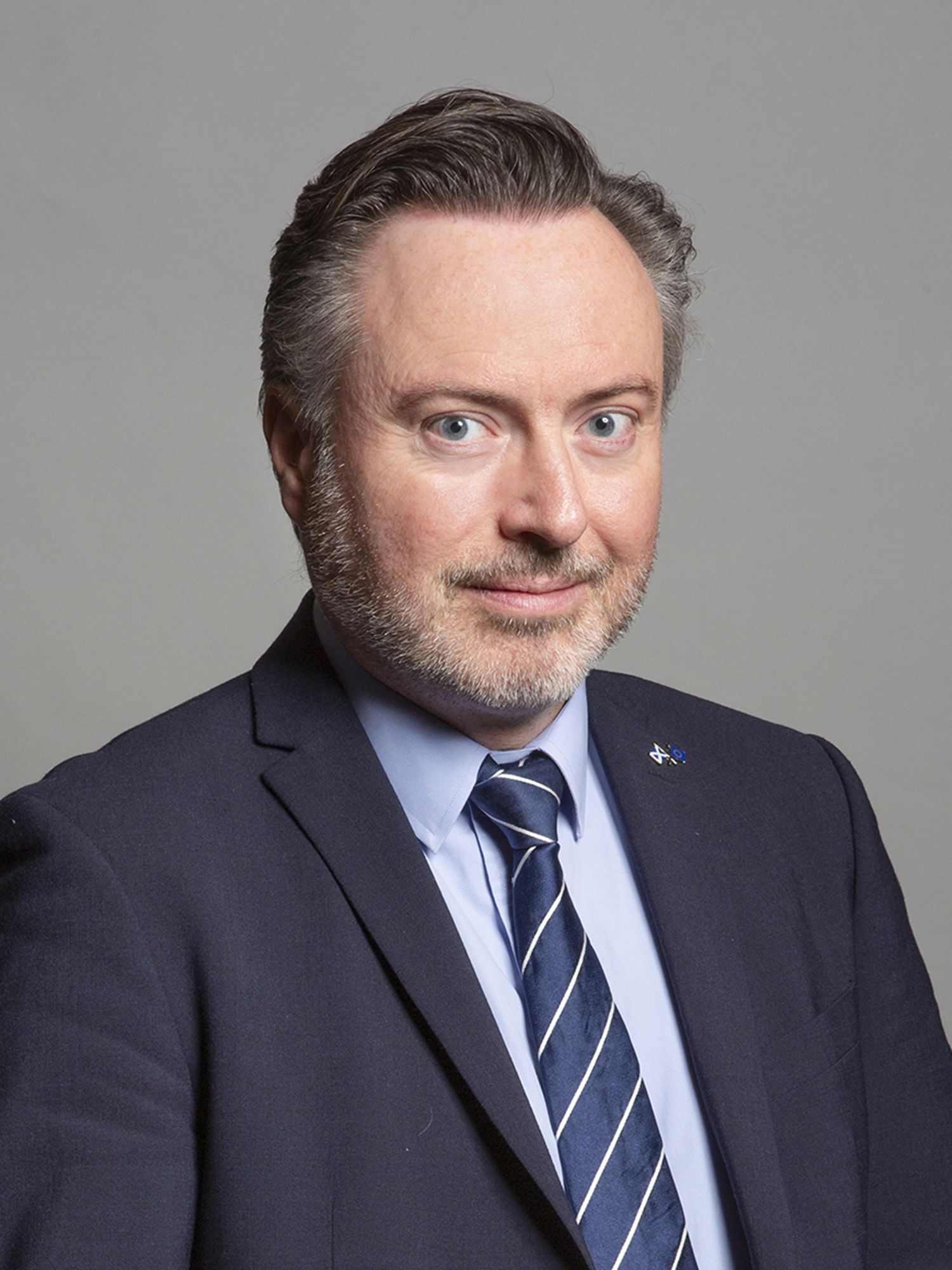
Official portrait, 2019

He contested Edinburgh West for the SNP at the 2001 general election, coming fourth. At the 2003 Scottish Parliament election, he contested the same seat, again coming fourth. Smith was Group Advisor for Justice, Business and Europe for the SNP Group in the Scottish Parliament from 2002 to 2004.

On 12 December 2019, Smith was elected as the Member of Parliament (MP) for Stirling, unseating the previous Conservative Party incumbent Stephen Kerr with a majority of 9,254 votes or 17.6%. Following his election, Smith ceased to be an MEP, as an individual cannot simultaneously be a member of a member state's legislature and of the European Parliament.

In July 2022 Smith rejected Labour calls for a general election on the grounds that "I... just enjoy what's going on in the UK Government right now because it's actually strengthening our case that Westminster doesn't work."

Smith faced a selection challenge for the SNP candidacy of the Stirling and Strathallan seat from the husband of the constituency MSP Evelyn Tweed. It was reported that Smith "easily" saw off the challenge. However, he subsequently lost the seat in the 2024 general election.

== Out-of-parliament career ==
Following his defeat at the 2024 UK General Election, Smith became a founding partner of the public affairs consultancy Atland.

== Return to politics ==
=== Scottish Parliament ===
In February 2026, Smith was announced as an SNP candidate for Mid Scotland and Fife at the 2026 Scottish Parliamentary Elections. He served as the convener of the Criminal Justice Committee from 10 June 2026 until being appointed the Minister for Innovation, Technology and Tertiary Education on 8 September 2026, following the resignation of Ben Macpherson.

== Personal life ==
On 30 July 2023, Smith married his long-time partner Jonathon Ramsay at Bannockburn House.

Parliament of the United Kingdom
Preceded by Stephen Kerr	Member of Parliament for Stirling; 2019–2024	Constituency abolished
