= Croftamie =

Coordinates: 56.042°N 4.446°W

Croftamie: Scottish Gaelic: Croit Sheumaidh; Scots: Crafteme
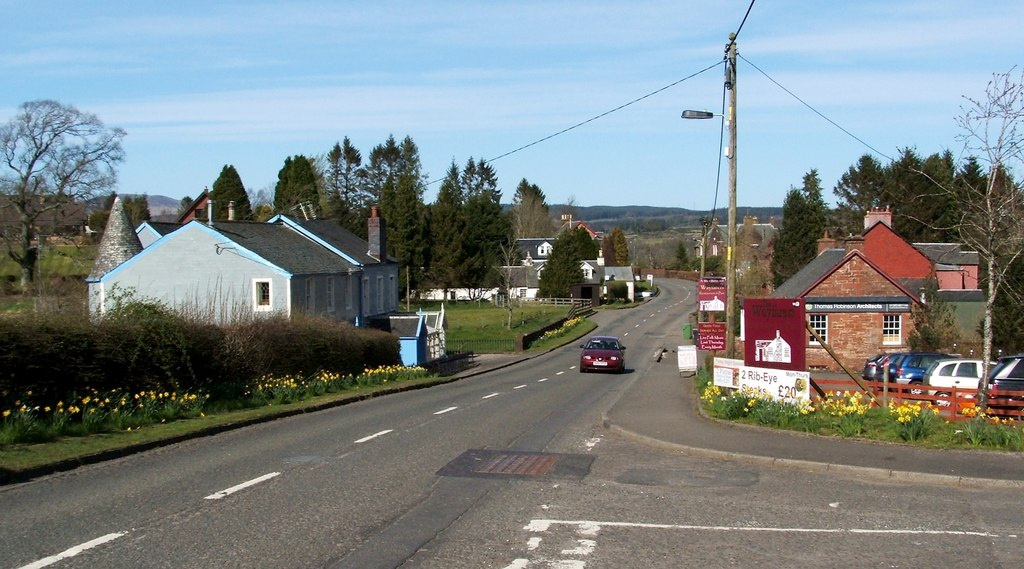
- The main road through Croftamie

- Location within the Stirling council area
- OS grid reference: NS476859
- Civil parish: Kilmaronock
- Council area: Stirling
- Lieutenancy area: Stirling and Falkirk
- Country: Scotland
- Sovereign state: United Kingdom
- Post town: GLASGOW
- Postcode district: G63
- Dialling code: 01360
- Police: Scotland
- Fire: Scottish
- Ambulance: Scottish
- UK Parliament: Stirling and Strathallan
- Scottish Parliament: Stirling

Croftamie (Scottish Gaelic Croit Sheumaidh) is a small village and community council area in the Stirling council area in Scotland. It lies to the south of the larger village of Drymen.

The village was traditionally part of Dunbartonshire. Under the local government reforms in 1975 it became part of the Dumbarton district of Strathclyde. A boundary change in 1983 transferred Croftamie to the Stirling District of the Central Region. Further reforms in 1996 saw the Central Region abolished and Stirling District became the unitary Stirling council area.

There is an active community council for Croftamie, which generally meets at the But and Ben public house.

Drymen station on the Forth and Clyde Junction Railway was situated in the village.

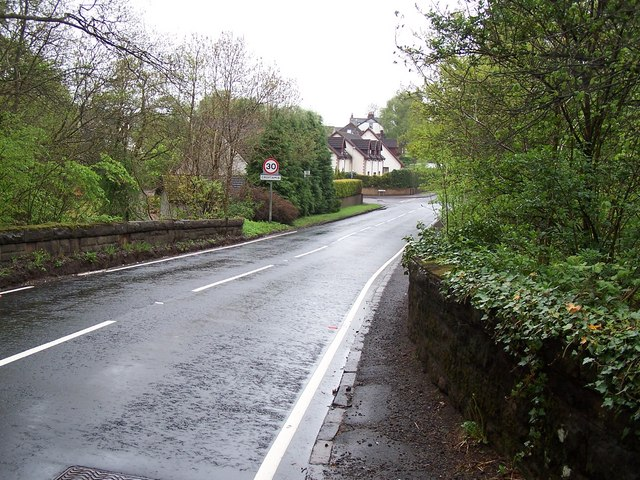
Croftamie, crossing the Catter Burn
