= Craig Mathieson (polar explorer) =

Scottish polar explorer

Craig Mathieson is a polar explorer who is 'Explorer-in-Residence' with the Royal Scottish Geographical Society.

Craig takes selected young people from high school all over Scotland on a polar expeditions, to improve their confidence and self belief.

== Overview ==
Born in Johnstone, Renfrewshire and raised in Buchlyvie, Stirlingshire, Mathieson was educated at Balfron High School. He began his working life overseas in the military, before moving into HM Customs & Excise as an inspector and anti-fraud officer. He spent seven years with Ernst & Young, before joining Johnston Carmichael in 2007. In January 2014, Craig Mathieson joined accountancy firm French Duncan to head a new VAT department. In 2018 he was awarded an honorary doctorate by Abertay University in Dundee.

== Expeditions ==
He successfully led the first dedicated Scottish Expedition to the South Pole in 2004, man-hauling his sledge 730 miles over the Antarctic Continent, and two years later led an expedition to the Geographical North Pole, taking a 16-year-old boy, Chris Struthers of Falkirk as part of his team. Chris is now an engineering geologist based in New Zealand.

In 2009 he was Leader of the 'Northern Lights' sea kayaking expedition on the east coast of Greenland

== Appointments ==
He was appointed special advisor to HM Forces regarding Polar training and guiding in 2012.

In 2013 he was appointed 'Explorer-in-Residence' by Royal Scottish Geographical Society.

== Charity work ==
Mathieson established the Polar Academy charity in 2013, taking young adults from a variety of backgrounds and inspiring them through participation in Arctic expeditions. The young adults Mathieson targets for his expeditions are not those who fit the profile of the extreme high achievers or the other extreme, for which there is an abundance of initiatives already in existence. Rather, Mathieson aims to help the average young adult who struggles through life – surviving without recognition and without ever truly realizing their full potential.
