= Sylvia Jackson =

Scottish politician (1946–2022)

Member of the Scottish Parliament for Stirling
- In office 6 May 1999 – 2 April 2007
- Preceded by: New Parliament
- Succeeded by: Bruce Crawford

Personal details
- Born: 3 December 1946 Lincolnshire, England
- Died: 27 July 2022 (aged 75) Winchester, England
- Party: Scottish Labour Party

Sylvia Jackson (3 December 1946 – 27 July 2022) was a Scottish Labour Party politician, and former Member of the Scottish Parliament (MSP).

== Early life and education ==
Jackson was born 3 December 1946 in Willingham, Lincolnshire, to Herbert Woodforth and Lucy Franklin. She was attended Brigg High School for Girls, before studying chemistry at the University of Hull. She stayed at Hull for postgraduate study and attained a master’s degree in education.

With her husband Michael, Jackson moved to Lancaster, and received a PhD in education either there or at Stirling.

Jackson worked for a time as a chemistry teacher, before going on to lecture in education at the University of Edinburgh.

== Political career ==
Jackson was elected as MSP for Stirling in 1999. She was re-elected in 2003, but lost her seat in the Scottish Parliament election of 3 May 2007, to Bruce Crawford of the SNP.

== Personal life ==
Jackson married Michael Jackson, whom she had met at university, in 1970.

Jackson died from cancer at a hospice in Winchester, on 27 July 2022, at the age of 75.

Scottish Parliament
New parliament Scotland Act 1998	Member of the Scottish Parliament for Stirling; 1999–2007	Succeeded by Bruce Crawford
