= Buchlyvie railway station =

Disused railway station in Buchlyvie, Stirling

Buchlyvie
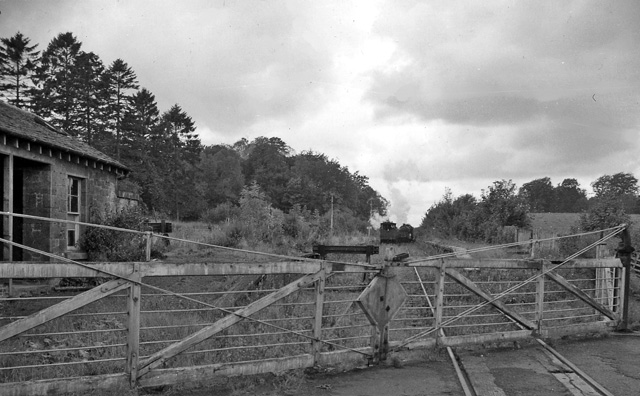
- The site of the station in 1961

General information
- Location: Buchlyvie, Stirling; Scotland
- Coordinates: 56.1183°N 4.3109°W
- Grid reference: NS564941
- Platforms: 1 (initially); 2 (later added)

Other information
- Status: Disused

History
- Original company: Forth and Clyde Junction Railway
- Pre-grouping: North British Railway
- Post-grouping: London and North Eastern Railway

Key dates
- 26 May 1856: Opened
- 1 October 1951: Closed to passengers
- 5 October 1959: Closed to goods
Location

Buchlyvie railway station served the village of Buchlyvie, Stirling, Scotland, from 1856 to 1959 on the Forth and Clyde Junction Railway.

== History ==
The station was opened on 26 May 1856 by the Forth and Clyde Junction Railway. On the westbound platform was the station building and on the south side was the goods yard. The station initially had one platform but a second one was built in 1892 as well as a signal box and a loop. The signal box was closed and replaced with a new one in 1895 when the loop was reduced to a single track. The station closed to passengers on 1 October 1951 and the signal box closed in 1956. The station closed to goods on 5 October 1959.

Preceding station	Disused railways	Following station
Balfron; Line and station closed	Forth and Clyde Junction Railway	Port of Menteith; Line and station closed
