= Brian Keighley =

Scottish medical doctor, former chair of BMA Scotland

Brian Douglas Keighley MBE FRCGP FRCPE JP (21 May 1948 – 9 November 2015) was a Scottish medical doctor who worked as a general practitioner (GP) and was the chair of the Scottish Council of the British Medical Association (BMA) from 2009 to December 2014.

== Early life ==
Keighley was born in 1948 and grew up in Bishopbriggs. His childhood holidays were spent on Inchmurrin, an island in Loch Lomond. He was educated at The Glasgow Academy, then studied at the University of Glasgow graduating with a medical degree in 1972.

== Career ==
In 1974, as a GP trainee, he joined a medical practice in Balfron, Stirlingshire. He became a partner at the practice the following year, then a trainer in 1978. He retired from clinical practice in November 2013.

He was a member of representative bodies throughout his clinical career. He was an elected member of the Council of the General Medical Council (GMC) 1994−2008.

From 1997 to 2000 Keighley was Chairman of the Joint Committee on Postgraduate Training for General Practice (JCPTGP)- the organisation that regulated GP training in the UK. In 1998 amendments were introduced that he described as "stiletto powers", allowing remedial action at the correct level.

He was chair of the Scottish General Practitioners Committee (SGPC) 1995−1998. He was deputy chair of BMA's Scottish council from July 2007, then elected as chair in August 2009. During his time in these positions he faced issues such as public sector pension reform and NHS contractual change. As the outgoing chair in 2014, Keighley delivered a speech to the BMA's annual conference in which he directly confronted the issue of the level of taxation needed for adequate healthcare; this generated much comment from politicians.

He was a champion of minimum pricing for alcohol.

He was member of the council of the Royal College of General Practitioners (RCGP) from 2000−2008. In 2010 he became the first chair of the RCGP's Audit Committee.

In 1997 he published a book Guide to Postgraduate Medical Education with Stuart Murray.

== Honours and awards ==
He became a Fellow of the Royal College of General Practitioners (FRCGP) in 1990, then became a Fellow of the Royal College of Physicians of Edinburgh (FRCPEd) in 2015.

In 2006, the BMA awarded Keighley their Association medal. He received a MBE in the 2015 New Year Honours for services to healthcare.

== Personal life ==
His first marriage was to Ruth Maguire and they had two sons together. After this was dissolved, his second marriage was to Lesley Stirling. Away from medicine and politics, he enjoyed angling.
