= Chris Kane (politician) =

British politician

Chris Kane MP
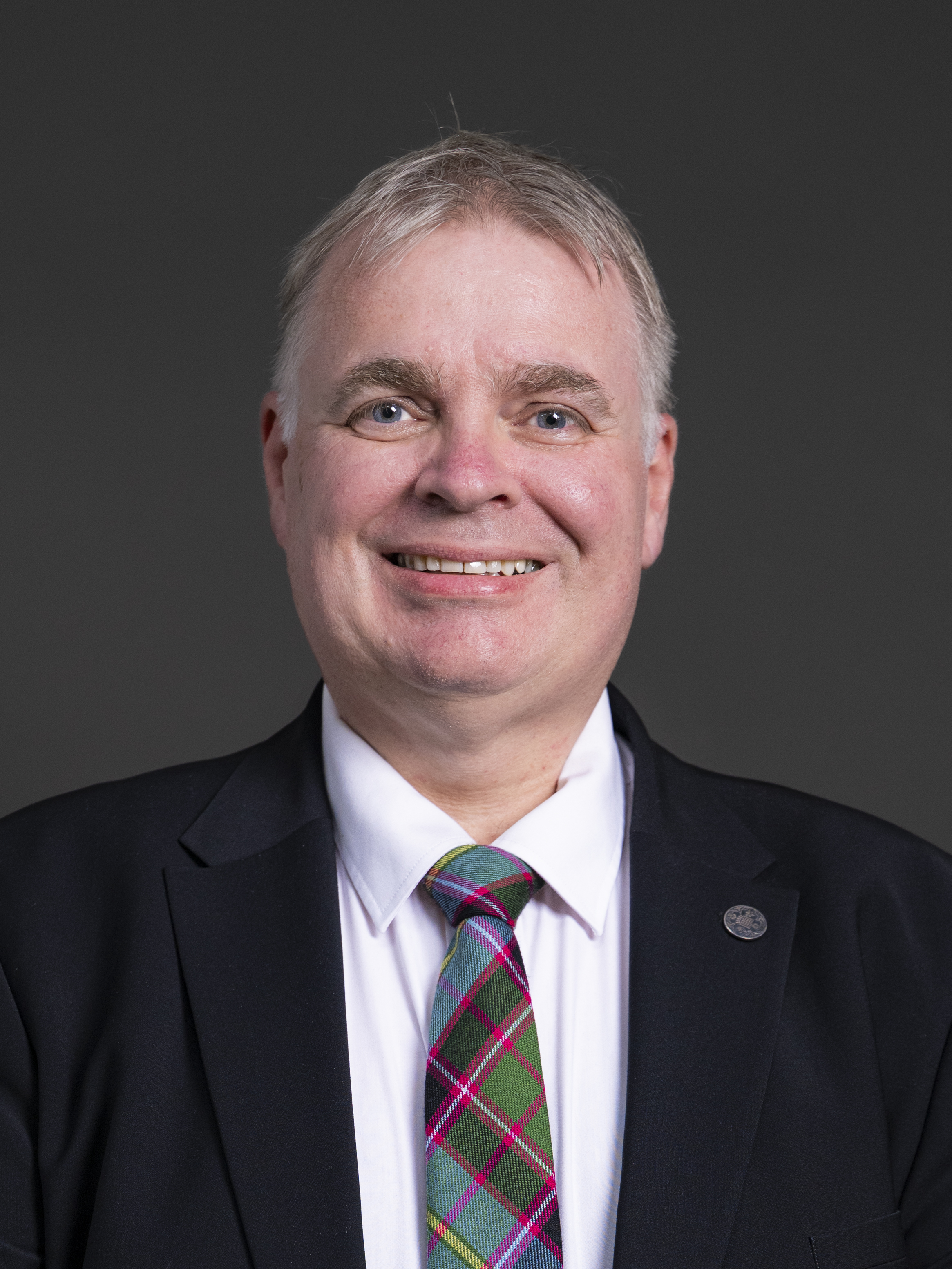
- Official portrait, 2026

Member of Parliament for Stirling and Strathallan
- Incumbent
- Assumed office 4 July 2024
- Preceded by: Constituency Established
- Majority: 1,394 (2.8%)

Personal details
- Born: August 1976 (age 50) Stirling, Scotland
- Party: Labour

Chris Kane (born August 1976) is a Scottish Labour Party politician serving as the Member of Parliament for Stirling and Strathallan since 2024.

Prior to election as an MP, he was a local councillor representing the Stirling East ward from May 2017, and served as council leader from May 2022. He stood unsuccessfully for the Stirling constituency at the 2017 general election.

Kane said his first job was helping tidy up in his father's electrical shop. He has previously worked as a journalist and radio broadcaster.
