= George Chalmers (artist) =

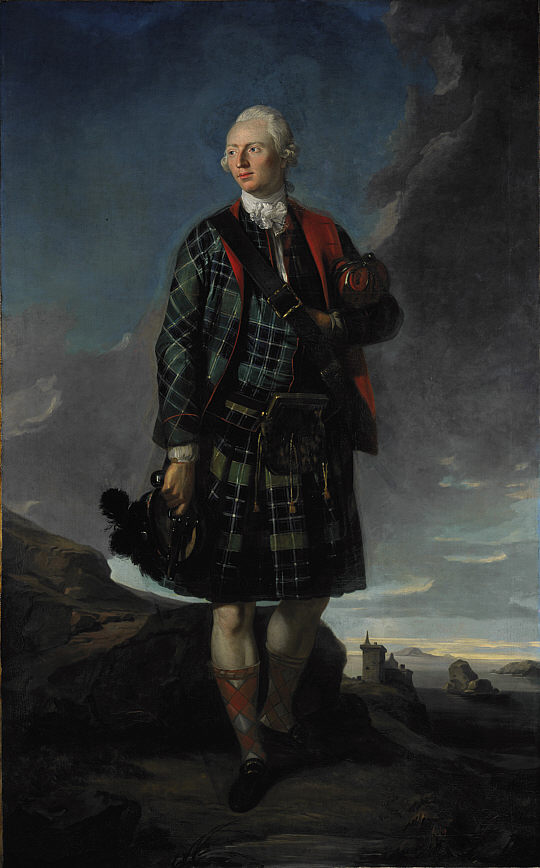
Portrait of Alexander Macdonald, 1st Baron Macdonald, now at the National Gallery of Scotland.

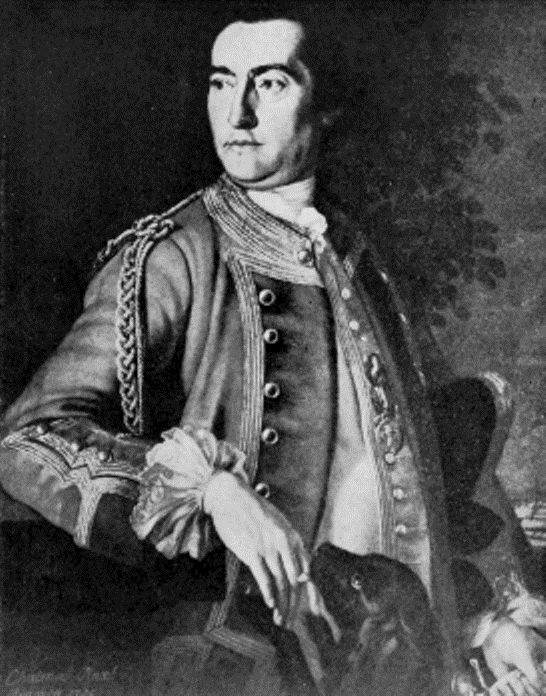
Edward Cornwallis by Sir George Chalmers (1755)

Sir George Chalmers, Bart., a native of Edinburgh and a pupil of Allan Ramsay, exhibited portraits at the Royal Academy from 1776 to 1790.

He died in London in 1791. He was buried in Old St. Pancras Churchyard on 15 November 1791 next to his wife Dame Isabella Chalmers who had died in 1784. His grave was lost and is not listed on the Burdett Coutts memorial within the churchyard to important graves lost.
