= Strathendrick and Aberfoyle Railway =

Former railway line in Scotland

Overview
- Locale: Scotland
- Dates of operation: 12 August 1880–5 August 1891
- Successor: North British Railway

Technical
- Track gauge: 1,435 mm (4 ft 8 1/2 in)

The Strathendrick and Aberfoyle Railway was a railway line in Scotland.

The line was operated by the North British Railway and then, after 1923, by the London and North Eastern Railway. Unable to compete in the face of road competition, the line was closed to passengers by British Railways in 1951 and completely in 1959.

== History ==
Strathendrick and Aberfoyle Railway Act 1880
- Act of Parliament
- Parliament of the United Kingdom
- Long title: An Act for making a Railway from the Blane Valley Railway to the Forth and Clyde Junction Railway at Gartness, and a Railway from the Forth and Clyde Junction Railway to Aberfoyle; and for other purposes.
- Citation: 43 & 44 Vict. c. clvi

Dates
- Royal assent: 12 August 1880

Text of statute as originally enacted

On 12 August 1880 the Strathendrick and Aberfoyle Railway was authorised by the Strathendrick and Aberfoyle Railway Act 1880 (43 & 44 Vict. c. clvi) to extend the Blane Valley Railway to Aberfoyle, running for part of the way between Gartness Junction and Buchlyvie Junction over the metals of the Forth and Clyde Junction Railway which had opened in 1856, and was also operated by the North British Railway. The line opened two years later on 1 August 1882. A new station a little nearer the village took on the Killearn name, with the existing Blane Valley Railway Killearn station renamed Dumgoyne after the celebrated hill of that name. A focus for the line was very much on visitors coming to see the natural beauty of the area, the Trossachs, and Loch Katrine, which had been popularised by Sir Walter Scott since the 1810s.

This route had originally been proposed in the plans for the Blane Valley Railway, but had not been pursued when money had fallen short. Plans had also called for the railway to be extended along Loch Ard towards Inversnaid on Loch Lomond, but this was blocked by the objections of the major landowner in the area, the Duke of Montrose.

The Strathendrick and Aberfoyle Railway was absorbed by the North British Railway by the North British Railway (General Powers) Act 1891 (54 & 55 Vict. c. cciii) on 5 August 1891.

== Closure ==
By summer 1950 Aberfoyle was being served by three trains a day. The line was closed to passengers the next year, on 1 October 1951. Both the Forth and Clyde Junction Railway and Strathendrick and Aberfoyle Railway closed completely eight years later.
