= Stirling (Scottish Parliament constituency) =

Region or constituency of the Scottish Parliament

- County constituency for the Scottish Parliament
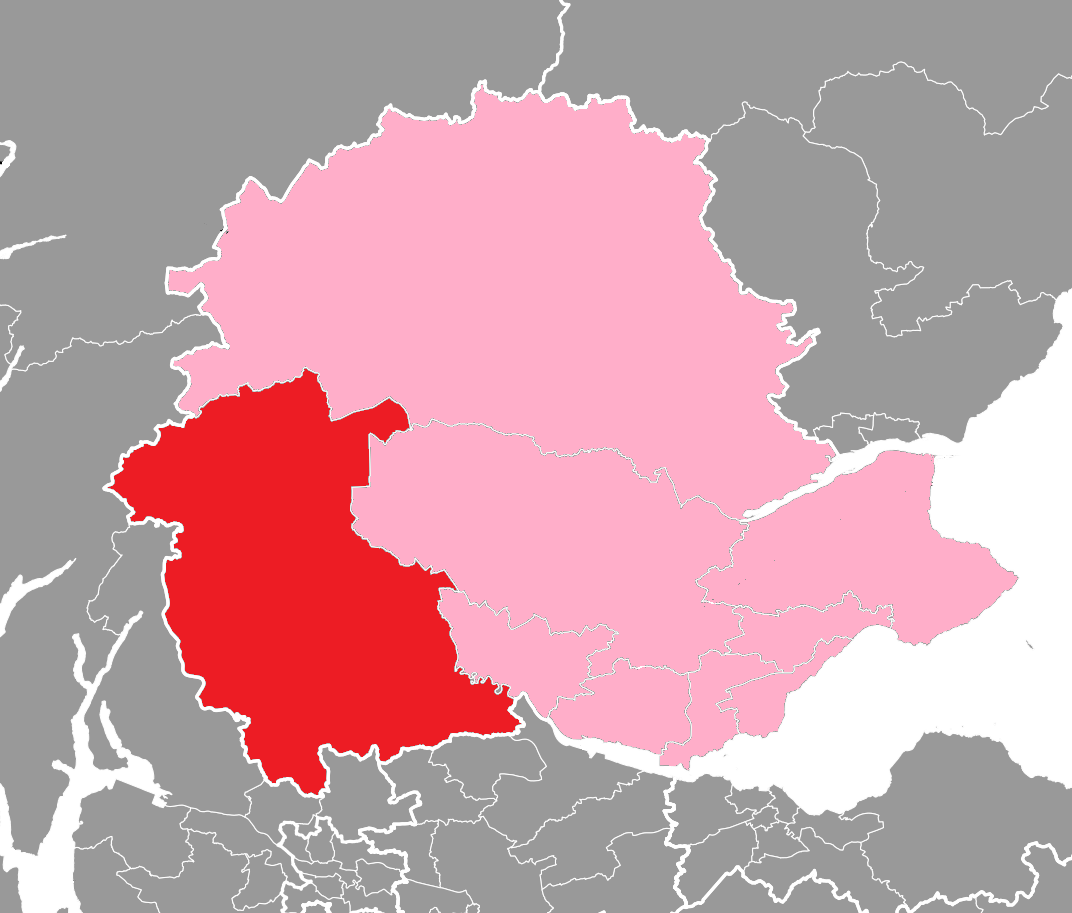

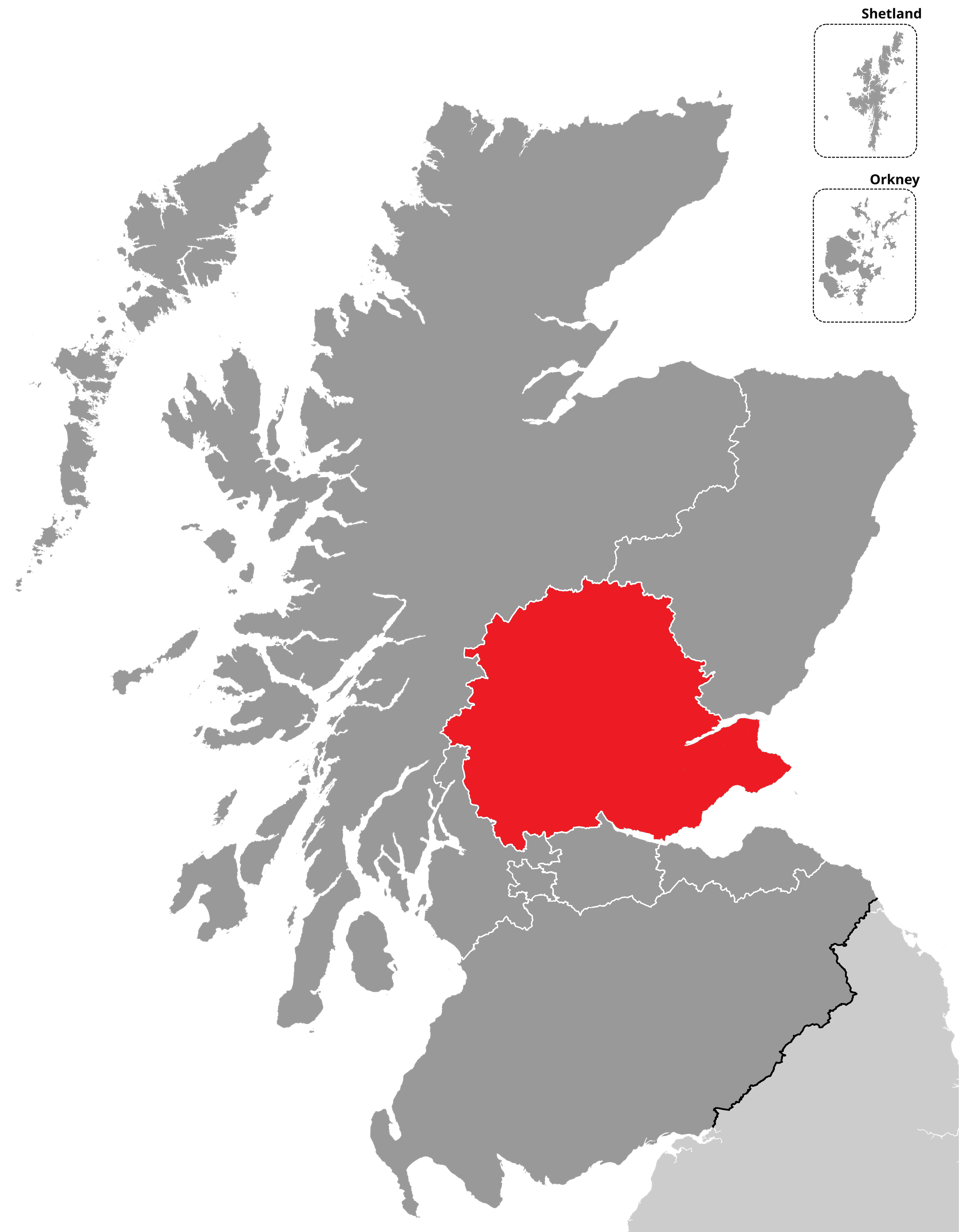
- Stirling shown within the Mid Scotland and Fife electoral region and the region shown within Scotland
- Electoral region: Mid Scotland and Fife
- Electorate: 55,338 (2026)

Current constituency
- Created: 1999
- Party: Scottish National Party
- MSP: Alyn Smith
- Council area: Stirling

Stirling is a county constituency of the Scottish Parliament covering part of the council area of Stirling. Under the additional-member electoral system used for elections to the Scottish Parliament, it elects one Member of the Scottish Parliament (MSP) by the plurality (first past the post) method of election. It is one of nine constituencies in the Mid Scotland and Fife electoral region, which elects seven additional members, in addition to the nine constituency MSPs, to produce a form of proportional representation for the region as a whole.

The seat has been held by Alyn Smith of the Scottish National Party since the 2026 Scottish Parliament election.

== Electoral region ==
The other eight constituencies of the Mid Scotland and Fife region are: Clackmannanshire and Dunblane, Cowdenbeath, Dunfermline, Fife North East, Kirkcaldy, Mid Fife and Glenrothes, Perthshire North, Perthshire South and Kinross-shire. The region covers all of the Clackmannanshire council area, all of the Fife council area, all of the Perth and Kinross council area and all of the Stirling council area.

== Constituency boundaries and council area ==
Map of boundaries from 2011

The constituency was created at the same time as the Scottish Parliament, in 1999, with the name and boundaries of a pre-existing House of Commons constituency. For the 2005 United Kingdom general election House of Commons constituencies in Scotland were generally replaced with new larger constituencies whilst Scottish Parliament constituencies were left unchanged, meaning the two sets of constituencies no longer aligned. The Stirling Westminster constituency was slightly enlarged and now includes all of the Stirling council area.

Scottish Parliament constituency boundaries were altered ahead of the 2011 Scottish Parliament election by the first periodic review of Scottish Parliament boundaries. Since this review, the Stirling council area has been covered by two constituencies, the Stirling seat and Clackmannanshire and Dunblane. The electoral wards of Stirling Council used in the creation of the Stirling seat at the 2011 review were:

- Bannockburn (entire ward)
- Forth and Endrick (entire ward)
- Stirling East (entire ward)
- Stirling North (entire ward, which was known as Castle until 2017)
- Stirling West (entire ward)
- Trossachs and Teith (entire ward)

At the second periodic review of Scottish Parliament boundaries in 2025 the seat boundaries were slightly altered to address the difference in electorate size between the Stirling and Clackmannanshire and Dunblane seats. A portion of the Stirling North ward was transferred to Clackmannanshire and Dunblane, with the rest of this ward remaining in the Stirling constituency. The area removed is the Causewayhead area of Stirling, making the River Forth the northern boundary of the seat in the built-up area of Stirling.

== Member of the Scottish Parliament ==
Election	Member	Party
1999	Sylvia Jackson	Labour
2007	Bruce Crawford	SNP
2021	Evelyn Tweed	SNP
2026	Alyn Smith	SNP

== Election results ==
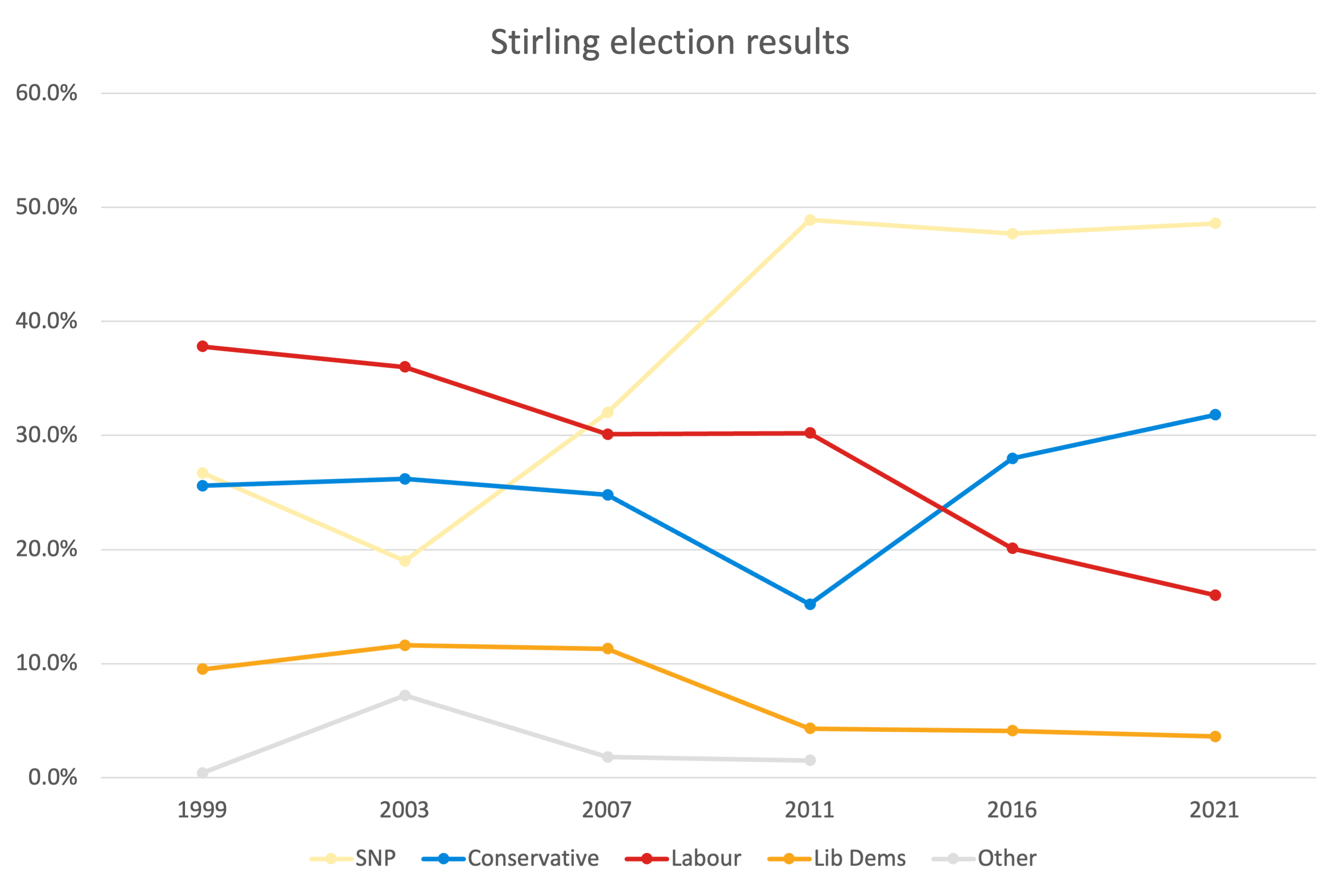
Stirling election results 1999-2021

=== 2020s ===
2026 Scottish Parliament election: Stirling
Party	Candidate	Constituency			Regional		
Party	Candidate	Votes	%	±%	Votes	%	±%
SNP	Alyn Smith	13,608	42.4	▼6.2	8,377	26.0	▼12.5
Green					5,447	16.9	▲6.4
Conservative	Stephen Kerr (Note: Incumbent member on the party list, or for another constituency)	6,166	19.2	▼12.2	5,171	16.1	▼13.1
Labour	Kainde Manji	5,124	15.9	▼0.5	4,604	14.3	▼0.4
Reform	Rachael Wright	4,908	15.3	New	5,256	16.3	▲16.1
Liberal Democrats	Jill Reilly	2,324	7.2	▲3.6	2,206	6.8	▲3.4
AtLS					284	0.9	New
Independent Green Voice					277	0.9	New
Scottish Family					203	0.6	Steady
ISP					201	0.6	New
Scottish Socialist					106	0.3	New
Scottish Libertarian					39	0.1	▼0.1
Advance UK					38	0.1	New
Majority		7,442	23.2	▲6.4			
Valid votes		32,130			32,209		
Invalid votes		159			79		
Turnout		32,289	58.4	▼10.9	32,288	58.4	▼10.9
SNP hold		Swing					
Notes

2021 Scottish Parliament election: Stirling
Party	Candidate	Constituency			Regional		
Party	Candidate	Votes	%	±%	Votes	%	±%
SNP	Evelyn Tweed	19,882	48.6	▲0.9	15,779	38.5	▼1.3
Conservative	Dean Lockhart (Note: Incumbent member on the party list, or for another constituency)	12,987	31.8	▲3.8	11,977	29.2	▲0.5
Labour	Chris Kane	6,556	16.0	▼4.1	6,019	14.7	▼2.7
Green					4,306	10.5	▲2.2
Liberal Democrats	Fayzan Rehman	1,466	3.6	▼0.5	1,381	3.4	▲0.1
Alba					668	1.6	New
All for Unity					246	0.6	New
Scottish Family					228	0.6	New
Abolish the Scottish Parliament					97	0.2	New
Freedom Alliance (UK)					114	0.3	New
Reform					63	0.2	New
Renew					11	0.0	New
Scottish Libertarian					73	0.2	0.0
UKIP					48	0.1	▼1.4
Independent	Martin Keatings				16	0.0	New
Independent	Mercy Kamanja				0	0.0	New
Majority		6,895	16.8	▼2.9			
Valid votes		40,891			41,026		
Invalid votes		199			71		
Turnout		41,090	69.3	▲8.8	41,097	69.3	▲6.0
SNP hold		Swing					

=== 2010s ===
2016 Scottish Parliament election: Stirling
Party	Candidate	Constituency			Regional		
Party	Candidate	Votes	%	±%	Votes	%	±%
SNP	Bruce Crawford (Note: Incumbent member for this constituency)	16,303	47.7	▼1.2	13,636	39.8	▼4.1
Conservative	Dean Lockhart (Note: Elected on the party list)	9,585	28.0	▲12.8	9,836	28.7	▲13.3
Labour	Rebecca Bell	6,885	20.1	▼10.1	5,972	17.4	▼9.6
Green					2,858	8.3	▲2.6
Liberal Democrats	Elisabeth Wilson	1,416	4.1	▼0.2	1,139	3.3	▼0.2
UKIP					507	1.5	▲0.6
RISE					162	0.5	New
Solidarity					112	0.3	▲0.2
Scottish Libertarian					54	0.2	New
Majority		6,718	19.7	▲1.0			
Valid votes		34,189			34,276		
Invalid votes		129			58		
Turnout		34,318	61.5	▲3.0	34,334	63.3	▲4.8
SNP hold		Swing		▼15.4			
Notes

2011 Scottish Parliament election: Stirling
Party	Candidate	Constituency			Region		
Party	Candidate	Votes	%	±%	Votes	%	±%
SNP	Bruce Crawford (Note: Incumbent member for this constituency)	14,858	48.9	N/A	13,366	43.9	N/A
Labour	John Hendry	9,188	30.2	N/A	8,215	27.0	N/A
Conservative	Neil Benny	4,610	15.2	N/A	4,684	15.4	N/A
Green					1,736	5.7	N/A
Liberal Democrats	Graham Reed	1,296	4.3	N/A	1,058	3.5	N/A
Independent (politician)	Jack Black	454	1.5	N/A			
Scottish Senior Citizens					306	1.0	N/A
UKIP					272	0.9	N/A
Socialist Labour					265	0.9	N/A
BNP					182	0.6	N/A
Scottish Socialist					97	0.3	N/A
Scottish Christian					89	0.3	N/A
CPA					86	0.3	N/A
Independent	Andrew Roger				55	0.2	N/A
Solidarity					27	0.1	N/A
Majority		5,670	18.7	N/A			
Valid votes		30,406			30,438		
Invalid votes		109			97		
Turnout		30,515	58.5	N/A	30,535	58.5	N/A
SNP win (new boundaries)							

=== 2000s ===
2007 Scottish Parliament election: Stirling
Party	Candidate	Votes	%	±%
SNP	Bruce Crawford	10,447	32.0	+13.0
Labour	Sylvia Jackson	9,827	30.1	−5.9
Conservative	Bob Dalrymple	8,081	24.8	−1.4
Liberal Democrats	Alex Cole-Hamilton	3,693	11.3	−0.3
Peace	Liz Law	557	1.8	New
Majority		620	1.9	N/A
Turnout		32,625	62.3	+5.4
SNP gain from Labour		Swing	+9.4	

2003 Scottish Parliament election: Stirling
Party	Candidate	Votes	%	±%
Labour	Sylvia Jackson	10,661	36.0	−1.8
Conservative	Brian Monteith	7,781	26.2	+0.6
SNP	Bruce Crawford	5,645	19.0	−7.7
Liberal Democrats	Kenyon Wright	3,432	11.6	+2.1
Scottish Socialist	Margaret Stewart	1,486	5.0	New
Scottish People's	Keith Harding	642	2.2	New
Majority		2,880	9.8	−1.3
Turnout		29,647	56.9	
Labour hold		Swing	−2.0	

=== 1990s ===
1999 Scottish Parliament election: Stirling
Party	Candidate	Votes	%	±%
Labour	Sylvia Jackson	13,533	37.8	N/A
SNP	Annabelle Ewing	9,522	26.7	N/A
Conservative	Brian Monteith	9,158	25.6	N/A
Liberal Democrats	Iain MacFarlane	3,407	9.5	N/A
Independent	Simon Kilgour	155	0.4	N/A
Majority		3,981	11.1	N/A
Turnout		35,805		
Labour win (new seat)				

== Footnotes ==
=== Bibliography ===
- "Second Review of Scottish Parliament Boundaries: Report to Scottish Ministers" (PDF). Boundaries Scotland. April 2025.
