= Stirling and Strathallan =

UK Parliament constituency (since 2024)

- County constituency for the House of Commons
- Interactive map of boundaries from 2024
- Boundary of Stirling and Strathallan in Scotland
- Subdivisions of Scotland: Stirlingshire and Perth and Kinross
- Electorate: 77,008 (March 2020)
- Major settlements: Stirling, Dunblane, Bannockburn, Bridge of Allan

Current constituency
- Created: 2024
- Member of Parliament: Chris Kane (Labour)
- Seats: One
- Created from: Stirling & Ochil and South Perthshire

Stirling and Strathallan is a constituency of the House of Commons in the UK Parliament. Created as a result of the 2023 review of Westminster constituencies, it was first contested at the 2024 general election, when it was won by Chris Kane of Scottish Labour.

The constituency name refers to the city of Stirling and the valley of Strathallan.

== Boundaries ==
The constituency is composed of the following:

- The whole of the Stirling Council area comprising the wards of Bannockburn, Trossachs and Teith, Forth and Endrick, Dunblane and Bridge of Allan, Stirling North, Stirling West and Stirling East.
- Part of the Perth and Kinross Council ward of Strathallan (majority, including the town of Auchterarder).

The Stirling Council area comprised the former constituency of Stirling; the part in Perth and Kinross Council was previously part of the abolished Ochil and South Perthshire constituency.

== Election results ==
=== Elections in the 2020s ===
General election 2024: Stirling and Strathallan
Party	Candidate	Votes	%	±%
Labour	Chris Kane	16,856	33.9	+26.2
SNP	Alyn Smith	15,462	31.1	−18.7
Conservative	Neil Benny	9,469	19.0	−16.0
Reform UK	Bill McDonald	3,145	6.3	N/A
Liberal Democrats	Hamish Taylor	2,530	5.1	−0.7
Green	Andrew Adam	2,320	4.7	+3.1
Majority		1,394	2.8	N/A
Turnout		49,782	65.3	−9.80
Registered electors		76,284		
Labour gain from SNP		Swing	+22.5	

=== Elections in the 2010s ===
2019 notional result (Note: Estimate of the 2019 general election result as if the revised boundaries recommended under the 2023 boundary review were in place)
Party	Vote	%
SNP	28,810	49.8
Conservative	20,254	35.0
Labour	4,424	7.7
Liberal Democrats	3,381	5.8
Scottish Greens	942	1.6
Majority	8,556	14.8
Turnout	57,811	75.1
Electorate	77,008	
