= Forth and Clyde Junction Railway =

Former railway line in Scotland

The Forth and Clyde Junction Railway was a railway line in Scotland which ran from Stirling to Balloch.

It was built with the expectation of conveying coal from the Fife coalfields to a quay at Bowling on the Clyde for onward transport, but that traffic did not materialise. The line opened in 1856; it was a simple rural line running through sparsely populated terrain, and traffic was thin.

In 1882 the Strathendrick and Aberfoyle Railway made a connection with the line, using a few miles of it as part of its own route to Aberfoyle.

The Forth and Clyde Junction route lost its passenger train service in 1934, but the Aberfoyle trains continued until they too were discontinued in 1951. Goods train continued on parts of the line, but in 1965 the line was completely closed, and none of it remains in railway use.

== History ==
=== First proposal ===
In 1845 there was a frenzy of railway promotion in Scotland; the Edinburgh and Glasgow Railway had been opened in 1842 and shown that railways of more than purely local relevance could be successful, and many schemes were put forward. Considerable volumes of coal were being extracted in Fife. While coastwise and export shipping from east coast ports was carried on, there was a commercial need to get access to the west coast ports. A railway to make the transit to the lower Clyde was proposed, but after 1845 the money market collapsed, and nothing further was heard of the idea for some years.

=== A practicable scheme ===
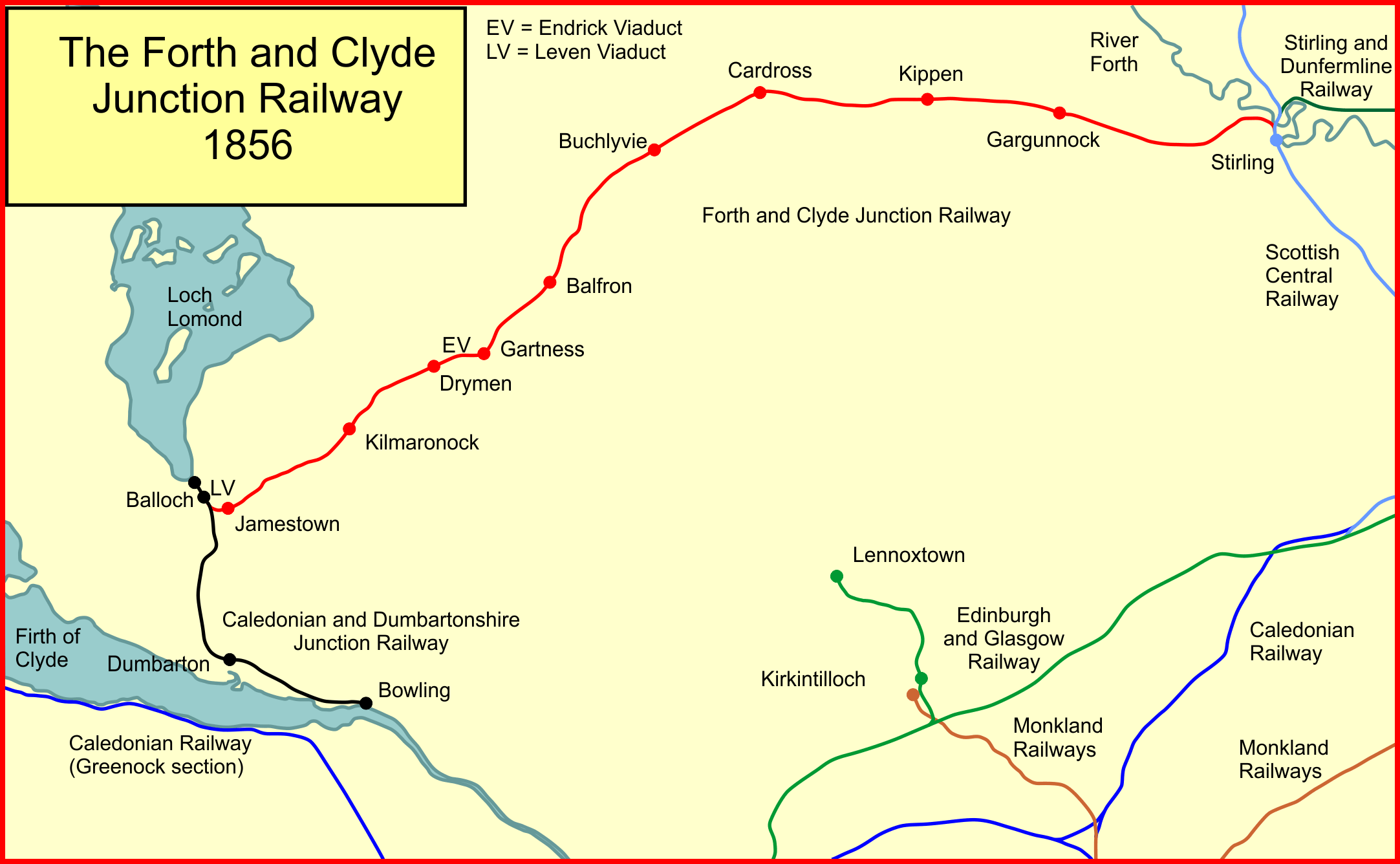
System map of the Forth and Clyde Junction Railway

By 1850 the railway network was developing, and Stirling was becoming a focal point for railways. The Stirling and Dunfermline Railway opened in 1850, connecting the Fife coalfields. However, when traffic was consigned from Fife to the west coast, the S&DR, the Edinburgh and Glasgow Railway and its associated companies were obliged to hand over the traffic to rival companies – the Scottish Central Railway and the Caledonian Railway – to complete the transit.

In 1851 a Forth and Clyde Junction Railway was promoted by commercial interests in Stirling to build a line north of the Campsie Fells to reach the harbour at Bowling, on the River Clyde. The line would connect with the Caledonian and Dumbartonshire Junction Railway (C&DJR; the spelling Dumbartonshire was used by the company). The C&DJR opened in 1850 and although it had intended to reach Glasgow, its finances only permitted construction from Balloch to Bowling; the F&CJR would join it near Alexandria, in the Leven Valley.

Forth and Clyde Junction Railway Act 1853
- Act of Parliament
- Parliament of the United Kingdom
- Long title: An Act for making a Railway commencing by a Junction with the Scottish Central Railway at Stirling, and terminating by a Junction with the Caledonian and Dumbartonshire Junction Railway at Alexandria, to be called "The Forth and Clyde Junction Railway."
- Citation: 16 & 17 Vict. c. cxxv

Dates
- Royal assent: 4 August 1853

Text of statute as originally enacted

The Forth and Clyde Junction Railway was incorporated by the Forth and Clyde Junction Railway Act 1853 (16 & 17 Vict. c. cxxv) on 4 August 1853; the line was to be 30 miles (48 km) in length, and the trunk haul traffic, minerals westbound to the Clyde and manufactured textiles from the Leven dyeworks eastbound, was to be dominant.

That the Line of Railway to be made and maintained under the Authority of this Act shall commence by a Junction with the Scottish Central Railway at or near the Station of that Railway in or near the Royal Burgh of Stirling in the Parishes of Stirling and Saint Ninian's, or one or other of them, in the County of Stirling, and terminate by a Junction with the Caledonian and Dumbartonshire Junction Railway at or near the Village of Alexandria in the Parish of Bonhill and County of Dumbarton, and will pass from, through, or into the following Parishes, Burghs, or other Places, or some of them, viz., Stirling, Saint Ninian's, Gargunnock, Kippen, Drymen, Balfron, Killearn, in the County of Stirling, Kippen in the County of Perth, and Kilmaronnock and Bonhill in the County of Dumbarton. — Section 28, Forth and Clyde Junction Railway Act 1853 (16 & 17 Vict. c. cxxv)

Construction was relatively straightforward; the line was built as a single line, although land was acquired for subsequent doubling. There were two major river crossings, of the Leven and the Endrick. The Leven bridge was a large timber viaduct, probably one of the last wooden bridges to be built in Scotland. (It had to be replaced by a metal bridge after about twenty years.) The Endrick crossing was a long low timber trestle.

=== Opening ===
The line opened in two stages: the eastern half opened as far as Buchlyvie on 18 March 1856, followed by the western half on 26 May 1856.

The line had been authorised to make a south-facing connection with the Caledonian and Dumbartonshire Junction Railway near Alexandria, reflecting the intended trunk haulage to the Clyde. In fact the actual construction arranged the connection facing Balloch. This seems to have been done without proper authority, and the reason for the change is unclear; it may have been simply an acceptance that the through goods traffic would lay over at Balloch. (Note: In those days, primitive lubrication of wagon bearings required attention at frequent intervals, and this may have been more simply achieved at Balloch.)

There were 32 staffed level crossings on the route.

=== The line in operation ===
By the time the line was open, the attraction of operating coal traffic over the line and back to Bowling had faded; there were shorter transits to better harbours on the Clyde, and the trunk traffic never materialised. Moreover, the population on the line itself was fairly limited, and some of the communities on the line were located some distance from the stations that purported to serve them. Drymen station was really in the smaller village of Croftamie, and Balfron (probably the largest village on the route) was not very near Balfron station. The line settled down to its role as a simple rural route, although some tourist traffic was developed.

Forth and Clyde Junction Railway (Dalmonach Branch) Act 1861
- Act of Parliament
- Parliament of the United Kingdom
- Long title: An Act to enable the Forth and Clyde Junction Railway Company to make a Branch Railway to Dalmonach Printworks in the County of Dumbarton, and to create additional Shares; and for other Purposes.
- Citation: 24 & 25 Vict. c. ccxxx

Dates
- Royal assent: 1 August 1861

The Dalmonach Dyeworks near Balloch sought a branch connection from the F&CJR; competitors further down the Leven Valley had connections from the C&DJR. The short branch was authorised on 1 August 1861 by the Forth and Clyde Junction Railway (Dalmonach Branch) Act 1861 (24 & 25 Vict. c. ccxxx).

The company operated the railway itself, although it hired in engine power from the Scottish Central Railway at first, but the arrangement was terminated from 7 February 1860, as the F&CJR considered the SCR's price was excessive. Locomotive power was hired in from the Scottish North Eastern Railway until four 2-4-0 tender engines were delivered from the Canada Works, Birkenhead, early in 1861.

=== Lease to the NBR ===
From 1865 the North British Railway and the Caledonian Railway expressed interest in acquiring the F&CJR. Absorption by the Caledonian Railway looked promising: as well as good terms the Caledonian would upgrade and modernise the track, but Parliament refused the necessary authority. The NBR withdrew an opposing parliamentary bill it had prepared for the purpose. The company decided to remain independent, but it agreed to lease the line to the North British Railway from 1866. On 1 August 1871 the lease was concluded; the NBR would pay 50% of gross revenue for 30 years. On 1 August 1875 the term was extended to 50 years, paying 6% on the F&CJR's capital of £106,000, rising with the potential dividend on NBR ordinary stock.. The company itself continued, receiving the lease charge but not operating any railway, until the grouping of railways in Great Britain in 1923.

Part of the lease agreement was that the remaining timber bridges on the line should be rebuilt in durable materials at the expense of the F&CJR. The Endrick timber trestle viaduct was now in a very poor state, having been repeatedly damaged by ice in the river during the 1860s, and it was rebuilt with iron truss girders on stone piers.

=== Passenger train service ===
The 1895 Bradshaw shows four through trains daily from Balloch to Stirling, with an additional short working from Balloch to Balfron. The throughout journey time was about two hours. Furthermore, the July 1922 Bradshaw guide shows a short working between Stirling and Buchlyvie and services continuing on to Edinburgh Waverley and Glasgow Queen Street Low Level.

=== The Aberfoyle line ===
The North British Railway sponsored a nominally independent line to reach Aberfoyle, an important town in the expanding tourist trade, and the Gateway to the Trossachs. The line was authorised as the Strathendrick and Aberfoyle Railway. It opened on 1 August 1882. It ran for a few miles on the F&CJR line, joining it at Gartness Junction and leaving it again at Buchlyvie Junction.

=== The twentieth century ===
The line passed into the ownership of the London and North Eastern Railway (LNER) in 1923.

As early as the 1920s bus competition eroded the already limited passenger carryings on the line. The LNER tried to reduce costs of the loss-making passenger service by introducing a steam railcar, Quicksilver, manufactured by the Sentinel Waggon Works in Shrewsbury. It had a vertical boiler power plant and geared drive. However its effect on the viability of the passenger business was insignificant. The thin population density on the route never became sufficient to sustain a passenger service, and the line was closed as a through passenger route on 1 October 1934. The former Strathendrick and Aberfoyle Railway route, now simply the Aberfoyle branch of the LNER, remained open for passenger traffic until 29 September 1951: the trains worked over the F&CJR route between Gartness and Buchlyvie.

=== Final closures ===
By 1949 the section between Drymen and Gartness was listed as "out of use", probably due to the state of the Endrick Viaduct. The section was formally closed on 1 November 1950. Successive closures to goods traffic followed: Buchlyvie Junction to Mye Siding also closed completely on 1 November 1950. The section from Mye Siding to Port of Menteith followed on 1 December 1952. On 5 October 1959 the sections between Gartness Junction and Buchlyvie Junction, Jamestown and Drymen, and from Port of Menteith to Stirling closed. On 1 September 1964 the short section from Croftengea Siding to Jamestown closed, and finally the Croftengea Siding stub closed on 9 April 1965. The entire route is now closed.

About 1969 a water main was erected crossing the Endrick, using the stone piers of the viaduct. A cycle path was later constructed on the route. The Leven viaduct near Balloch is now a pedestrian walkway.

== Topography ==
The line opened from Forth and Clyde Junction, Balloch to Buchlyvie on 26 May 1856, and from Buchlyvie to Stirling North Junction on 18 March 1856,. It closed to passenger services on 1 October 1934, except between Gartness and Buchlyvie, which closed on 29 September 1951.

Locations on the line were:

- Forth and Clyde Junction; diverged from the Balloch to Dumbarton line;
- Jamestown; industrial line to Dalmonach Works diverged;
- Kilmaronock; renamed Caldarvan in January 1877; (Note: At the request of R D MacKenzie of Caldarvan House, according to Noble.)
- Drymen;
- Endrick Viaduct;
- Gartness;
- Gartness Junction; line from Lennoxtown converged;
- Balfron;
- Balwill siding;
- Buchlyvie; line to Aberfoyle diverged; it ran alongside the Stirling line for a short distance;
- Mye Siding;
- Cardross; renamed Port of Monteith May 1858; (Note: A Cardross station near Helensburgh had opened in March 1858.) renamed Port of Mentieth 1880;
- Ladylands Siding (station); opened June 1861; Fridays only at first, then Saturdays only, later Thursdays only; renamed Ladylands Platform 11 July 1927;
- Fairfields Siding (station); opened June 1861; Fridays only; also known as Fairfield; closed 20 October 1866;
- Kippen;
- Gargunnock;
- Stirling North Junction; converged with Perth to Stirling line.

== Sources ==
- Awdry, Christopher (1990). Encyclopaedia of British Railway Companies. Sparkford: Patrick Stephens Ltd. ISBN 1-8526-0049-7. OCLC 19514063. CN 8983.
- Jowett, Alan (March 1989). Jowett's Railway Atlas of Great Britain and Ireland: From Pre-Grouping to the Present Day (1st ed.). Sparkford: Patrick Stephens Ltd. ISBN 978-1-85260-086-0. OCLC 22311137.
