= Stirling Council elections =

Local government elections in Stirling, Scotland

Stirling Council in Scotland holds elections every five years, previously holding them every four years from its creation as a single-tier authority in 1995 to 2007.

== Council elections ==
=== As a district council ===
Year	SNP	Conservative	Labour	Independent
1974	4	8	7	1
1977	4	8	7	1
1980 (Note: New ward boundaries.)	0	9	10	1
1984	0	8	11	1
1988	0	10	10	0
1992	0	10	10	0

=== As a unitary authority ===
Year	SNP	Conservative	Labour	Green	Liberal Democrats	Independent
1995	2	7	13	0	0	0
1999 (Note: New ward boundaries.)	2	9	11	0	0	0
2003	0	10	12	0	0	0
2007 (Note: Change to single transferable vote system and new ward boundaries.)	7	4	8	0	3	0
2012	9	4	8	1	0	0
2017 (Note: New ward boundaries.)	9	9	4	1	0	0
2022	8	7	6	1	0	1

== Results maps ==
2017 results map

== By-elections ==
=== 2003-2007 ===
Borestone By-Election 30 March 2006
Party	Candidate	Votes	%	±%
SNP	Scott Farmer	374	38.8	+16.5
Labour		335	34.8	−16.1
Liberal Democrats		165	17.1	+9.1
Conservative		57	5.9	−5.8
New Party		18	1.9	+1.9
Independent		14	1.5	+1.5
Majority		39	4.0	
Turnout		963		
SNP gain from Labour		Swing		

=== 2007-2012 ===
Bannockburn By-Election 30 April 2009
Party	Candidate	FPv%	Count						
Party	Candidate	FPv%	1	2	3	4	5	6	7
Labour	Violet Weir	39.9	1,131	1,134	1,141	1,162	1,175	1,196	1,288
SNP	Bill McDonald	37.6	1,067	1,072	1,078	1,095	1,110	1,162	1,228
Independent	Tommy Brookes	8.1	229	232	235	240	272	303	
Conservative	Catherine Berrill	6.1	173	176	178	194	201		
Independent	Breda O'Brien	3.1	89	94	96	99			
Liberal Democrats	Ethne Brown	2.9	82	83	91				
Green	Duncan Illingsworth	1.3	36	36					
Independent	Paul Campbell	1.0	28						
Labour hold									
Valid: 2,835 Quota: 1,419

=== 2012-2017 ===
Stirling East By-Election 1 October 2015
Party	Candidate	FPv%	Count		
Party	Candidate	FPv%	1	2	3
SNP	Gerry McLaughlan	45.2	1,311	1,367	1,388
Labour	Chris Kane	37.7	1,094	1,134	1,272
Conservative	Luke Davison	11.8	343	352	
Green	Alasdair Tollemache	5.2	152		
SNP hold					
Valid: 2,900 Spoilt: 28 Quota: 1,451 Turnout: 2,928

=== 2017-2022 ===
Forth and Endrick By-Election 6 May 2021
Party	Candidate	FPv%	Count				
Party	Candidate	FPv%	1	2	3	4	5
Conservative	Jane Hutchison	39.5	3,195	3,260	3,297	3,717	4,575
SNP	Paul Goodwin	32.6	2,636	2,657	3,090	3,445	
Labour	Colin O'Brien	14.5	1,172	1,259	1,439		
Green	Wendy Faulkner	9.3	754	830			
Liberal Democrats	James Maclaren	4.1	332				
Conservative gain from SNP							
Valid: 8,089 Spoilt: 74 Quota: 4,045 Turnout: 8,163

=== 2022-2027 ===
Dunblane and Bridge of Allan By-Election 16 March 2023
Party	Candidate	FPv%	Count					
Party	Candidate	FPv%	1	2	3	4	5	6
Conservative	Robin Kleinman	41.0	1,832	1,849	1,861	1,959	2,172	2,473
SNP	Ahsan Khan	26.9	1,202	1,205	1,416	1,491	1,683	
Labour	David Wilson	13.4	600	609	670	871		
Liberal Democrats	Dick Moerman	8.9	399	404	475			
Green	Clare Andrews	8.7	389	390				
Scottish Family	Nickie Willis	1.1	50					
Conservative gain from SNP								
Valid: 4,074 Spoilt: 26 Quota: 2,237 Turnout: 4,100

Dunblane and Bridge of Allan By-Election 25 January 2024
Party	Candidate	FPv%	Count					
Party	Candidate	FPv%	1	2	3	4	5	6
Conservative	Thomas Heald	37.8	1,644	1,653	1,714	1,738	1,998	2,286
SNP	Ahsan Khan	23.3	1,000	1,006	1,037	1,266	1,531	
Labour	David Wilson	20.2	869	874	989	1,147		
Green	Clare Andrews	10.1	433	442	485			
Liberal Democrats	Dick Moerman	6.8	292	296				
Scottish Family	Michael Willis	1.2	50					
Conservative hold								
Valid: 4,288 Spoilt: 27 Quota: 2,145 Turnout: 4,315

Dunblane and Bridge of Allan By-Election 15 August 2024
Party	Candidate	FPv%	Count					
Party	Candidate	FPv%	1	2	3	4	5	6
Labour	David Wilson	23.3	952	981	1,101	1,390	1,826	2,252
Conservative	Stuart McLuckie	27.9	1,143	1,214	1,284	1,328	1,361	
SNP	John Watson	18.8	770	793	826	1,076		
Green	Andrew Adam	16.1	659	670	760			
Liberal Democrats	Dick Moerman	8.4	345	382				
Independent	Alastair Majury	5.5	225					
Labour hold								
Valid: 4,094 Spoilt: 21 Quota: 2,048 Turnout: 4,115

Bannockburn By-Election 23 January 2025
Party	Candidate	FPv%	Count					
Party	Candidate	FPv%	1	2	3	4	5	6
SNP	Bob Buchanan	35.9	565	590	597	605	664	863
Labour	Yvonne Dickson	23.9	376	384	401	448	528	
Reform	William Docherty	22.7	358	360	367	425		
Conservative	Moira Benny	10.7	169	171	186			
Liberal Democrats	William Galloway	3.5	55	65				
Green	Marie Stadtler	3.4	53					
SNP gain from Labour								
Valid: 1,576 Spoilt: 22 Quota: 789 Turnout: 1,598

Stirling East By-Election 30 October 2025
Party	Candidate	FPv%	Count					
Party	Candidate	FPv%	1	2	3	4	5	6
SNP	Josh Fyvie	36.4	808	813	827	905	988	1,245
Labour	Yvonne Dickson	23.9	530	540	577	622	710	
Reform	William Docherty	23.3	517	523	572	578		
Green	Marie Stadtler	6.3	141	158	167			
Conservative	James Corbett	6.6	147	156				
Liberal Democrats	William Galloway	3.6	79					
SNP gain from Conservative								
Electorate: 8,662 Valid: 2,222 Spoilt: 28 Quota: 1,112 Turnout: 2,250

Forth and Endrick By-Election 1 October 2026
Party	Candidate	FPv%	Count						
Party	Candidate	FPv%	1	2	3	4	5	6	7
Conservative	Katie Harrison	34.2	1,188	1,199	1,232	1,390	1,404	1,504	1,732
SNP	Mhairi Duncan	30.5	1,057	1,064	1,084	1,106	1,305	1,463	
Labour	Paul Godzik	11.0	380	387	449	458	550		
Green	Andrew Adam	9.1	317	319	346	351			
Reform	Jeremy McDonald	8.6	298	304	313				
Liberal Democrats	James MacLaren	5.0	175	183					
Independent	Robert Davies	1.6	55						
Conservative hold									
Valid: 3,470 Spoilt: 23 Quota: 1,736 Turnout: 3,493
