= Endrick (disambiguation) =

Endrick (Endrick Felipe Moreira de Sousa Pessoa, born 2006) is a Brazilian footballer.

Endrick may also refer to:

- Endrick (footballer, born 1995) (Endrick dos Santos Parafita, born 1995), Brazilian-born Malaysian footballer
- Endrick Water, a river in Loch Lomond, Scotland
- Forth and Endrick (ward), a ward in Stirling Council, Scotland
- Endrick River, a river in New South Wales, Australia
