= Stirling North (ward) =

Electoral ward of Stirling, Scotland

Location of the ward (2007 to 2017 boundaries)

Stirling North is one of the seven wards used to elect members of the Stirling Council. Originally known as Castle from its creation in 2007, it returned three councillors and covered northern parts of the small city of Stirling, including Causewayhead, Cornton, Raploch and the town centre, as well as Stirling Castle from which the name derived. A 2017 national boundary review saw the ward become larger; this new territory consisted largely of an uninhabited area on the western slopes of the Ochil Hills and a rural area south of Blairlogie, but also incorporating the Cambuskenneth and Riverside neighbourhoods, with an increase in the electorate and an additional seat. It was also re-named at that time to the more descriptive Stirling North title. In 2019, the ward had a population of 15,885.

== Councillors ==
Election	Councillors			
2007	Jim Thompson (SNP)	John Hendry (Labour)	Graham Reed (Liberal Democrats)	3 seats
2012	Jim Thompson (SNP)	John Hendry (Labour)	Johanna Boyd (Labour)	3 seats
2017	Jim Thompson (SNP)	Danny Gibson (Labour)	Susan McGill (SNP)	Ross Oxburgh (Conservative)
2022	Jim Thompson (SNP)	Danny Gibson (Labour)	Susan McGill (SNP)	Rachel Nunn (Conservative)

== Election results ==
=== 2022 election ===
2022 Stirling Council election

Stirling North - 4 seats
Party	Candidate	FPv%	Count						
Party	Candidate	FPv%	1	2	3	4	5	6	7
SNP	Susan McGill (incumbent)	25.7	1,305						
Conservative	Rachel Nunn	22.8	1,161						
Labour	Danny Gibson (incumbent)	20.2	1,029						
SNP	Jim Thomson (incumbent)	12.6	642	872.7	878.2	879.6	886.3	908.4	1,474.8
Green	Amy Smith	13.7	695	727.3	735.6	737.9	751.7	852.1	
Liberal Democrats	Oliver Franklin	3.7	190	195.3	254.1	257.6	276.2		
Scottish Family	Shena McLelland	1.3	64	64.9	77.7	78.3			
Electorate: 11,589 Valid: 5,117 Spoilt: 91 Quota: 1,018 Turnout: 44.7%

=== 2017 election ===
2017 Stirling Council election

Stirling North - 4 seats
Party	Candidate	FPv%	Count							
Party	Candidate	FPv%	1	2	3	4	5	6	7	8
Conservative	Ross Oxburgh	26.7	1,237							
SNP	Susan McGill	22.8	1,054							
SNP	Jim Thomson (incumbent)	15.7	727	740.3	845.6	862.2	885.2	899.7	906.4	1,246.3
Labour	Danny Gibson (incumbent)	13.3	616	665.1	668.7	682.2	729.8	994.1		
Green	Chloe Campbell	10.7	496	511.0	519.1	543.9	614.0	637.2	655.3	
Labour	Jen Preston	5.7	266	302.8	305.9	312.9	349.6			
Liberal Democrats	Fayzan Rehman	3.2	150	205.6	206.1	222.4				
Independent	James McDonald	1.8	85	117.3	118.3					
Electorate: 10,512 Valid: 4,631 Spoilt: 124 Quota: 927 Turnout: 45.2%

=== 2012 election ===
2012 Stirling Council election

Castle - 3 seats
Party	Candidate	FPv%	Count						
Party	Candidate	FPv%	1	2	3	4	5	6	7
SNP	Jim Thomson (incumbent)	27.54%	828						
Labour	John Hendry (incumbent)	18.89%	568	570.1	581.2	606.5	643.2	673.3	759.8
Labour	Johanna Boyd	17.59%	529	530.6	544.7	556.5	588.3	631.3	748.1
Green	Zara Kitson	10.87%	327	331	366.5	409.9	497.3	575.7	
Conservative	Jennifer Gordon	8.71%	262	262.6	287.9	294.1	326.4		
Independent	Steve Sankey	7.55%	227	228.8	250.2	288.1			
SNP	David Wilson	4.72%	142	201.7	207.9				
Liberal Democrats	Graham Reed (incumbent)	4.12%	124	126.8					
Electorate: 7,843 Valid: 3,007 Spoilt: 67 Quota: 752 Turnout: 3,074 (38.34%)

=== 2007 election ===
2007 Stirling Council election

Stirling council election, 2007: Castle
Party	Candidate	FPv%	%	Seat	Count
SNP	Jim Thomson	1,482	36.1	1	1
Labour	John Hendry	1,083	26.4	2	1
Conservative	Lesley Stein	596	14.5		
Liberal Democrats	Graham Reed	456	11.1	3	5
Labour	Frances Junnier	340	8.3		
Independent	James McDonald	146	3.6		
