= Steven Paterson =

Scottish politician (born 1975)

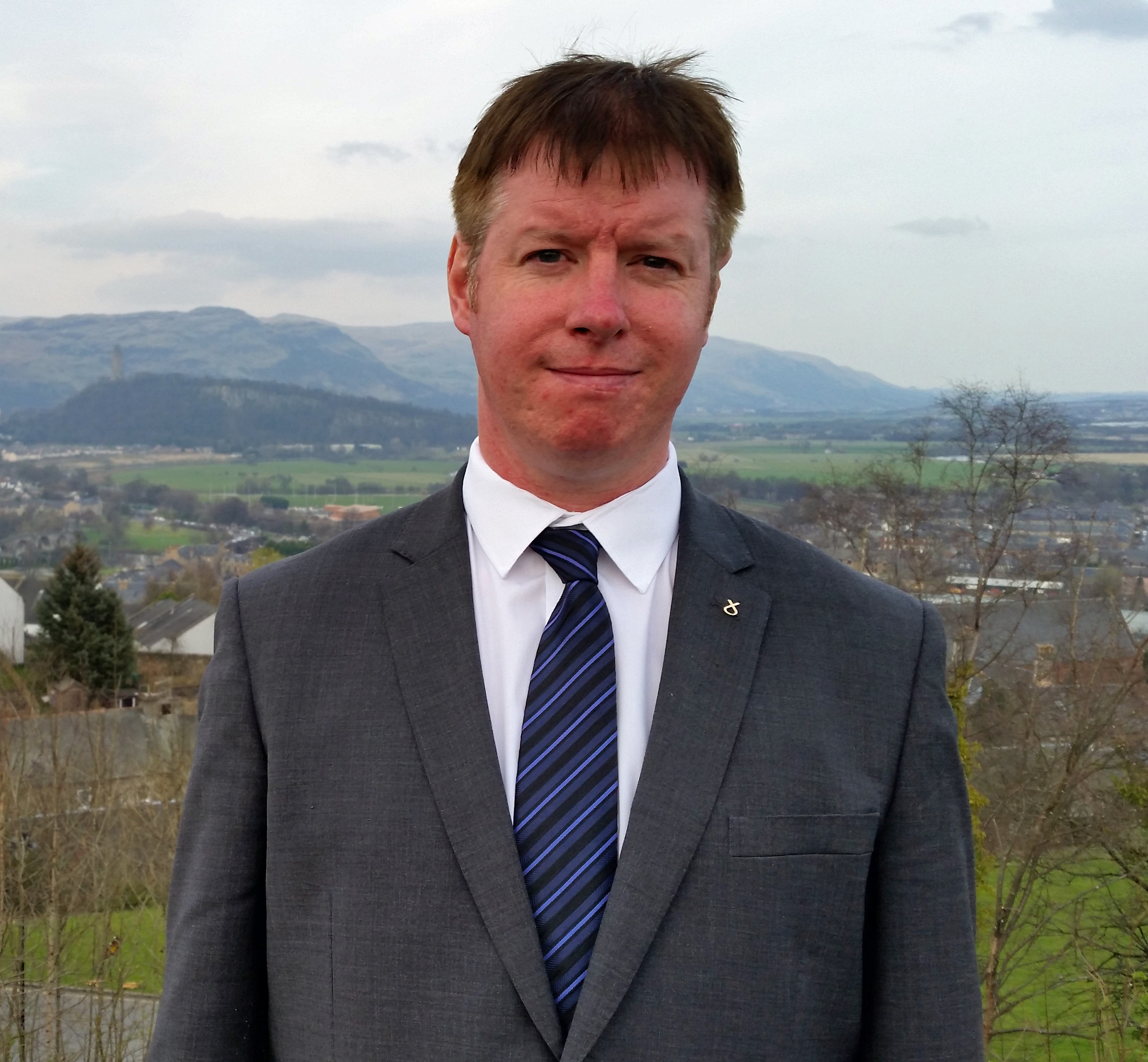
- Paterson in 2015

Member of Parliament for Stirling
- In office 8 May 2015 – 3 May 2017
- Preceded by: Anne McGuire
- Succeeded by: Stephen Kerr

Personal details
- Born: 25 April 1975 (age 51) Cambusbarron, Scotland, UK
- Party: Scottish National Party
- Education: Robert Gordon University; University of Stirling

Steven Alexander Paterson (born 25 April 1975) is a former Scottish National Party (SNP) politician who served as the Member of Parliament (MP) for Stirling between 2015 and 2017. He was not re-selected by the SNP to contest the Stirling seat at the 2019 general election.

== Early life and education ==
Paterson was born in Stirling Royal Infirmary on 25 April 1975. He is the elder of two children born to Peter Paterson and Janice Paterson (née McGill). His father was an English teacher at St Modan's High School in Stirling as well as a local historian and his mother was a nurse with the local health board.

Paterson was educated at Cambusbarron Primary School and Stirling High School. He then studied Publishing at Robert Gordon University in Aberdeen and History and Politics at Stirling University where he graduated with Honours.

== Political career ==
In 2006, he was appointed as Media and Communications Manager to the SNP MSP Bruce Crawford. He was elected to Stirling Council in the 2007 Stirling Council election for the Stirling East ward where he topped the poll with 1,821 first preferences. In the 2012 Stirling Council election he was re-elected, again topping the poll, with 1,278 first preferences.

In January 2013, Paterson was appointed deputy SNP group leader at Stirling Council.

On 15 January 2015, he was chosen as the SNP candidate to contest Stirling constituency at the general election on 7 May. He came first after receiving 23,783 first preference votes with a 45.6% share of the vote to achieve a 10,480 majority over Labour where their incumbent MP, Anne McGuire, retired.

On 30 June 2015, he announced his intention to stand down as Councillor for the Stirling East ward.

On 1 July 2015, Paterson made his maiden speech in the House of Commons. He was appointed to the SNP Westminster Group's Defence Team which at the time was led by SNP Defence spokesperson Brendan O'Hara.

Paterson was defeated at the 2017 General Election by the Conservative candidate Stephen Kerr who gained the seat by 148 votes.

== Controversy ==
Paterson made national news in late 2016 by claiming expenses of £40 for dog care (This was later found to be an administrative error by one of his staff - Paterson did not own a dog.) and £640 for a chair (later found to be not for 1 chair but for all office furniture including several chairs and desks) and for being the UK's fifth most expensive MP, claiming almost £100,000 in just one year. A local councilor accused Paterson of showing a 'cavalier attitude to taxpayers’ money' whilst others remarked this was more likely to be down to travelling the constituency's vast distances each week to attend surgeries.

Parliament of the United Kingdom
Preceded by Anne McGuire	Member of Parliament for Stirling; 2015–2017	Succeeded by Stephen Kerr
