= Stirling (UK Parliament constituency) =

UK Parliament constituency (1983–2024)

Coordinates: 56.119°N 4.082°W

- Former county constituency for the House of Commons
- Boundary of Stirling in Scotland
- Subdivision: Stirling
- Major settlements: Bridge of Allan, Crianlarich, Dunblane, Stirling, Tyndrum

1983–2024
- Seats: One
- Created from: Stirling, Falkirk & Grangemouth, Stirlingshire West and Kinross & West Perthshire
- Replaced by: Stirling and Strathallan

Stirling was a county constituency of the House of Commons of the Parliament of the United Kingdom. It elected one Member of Parliament (MP) by the first past the post system of election.

Further to the completion of the 2023 Periodic Review of Westminster constituencies, the seat was abolished and reformed as Stirling and Strathallan for the 2024 general election, expanding into Strathallan in Perth and Kinross council.

== Boundaries ==
Map of boundaries 2005-2024

1983–1997: The Stirling District electoral divisions of Airthrey, Bannockburn, Castle, Dounebraes, Menteith, Queensland, St Ninians, Strathendrick, Viewforth, and Wallace.

1997–2005: The Stirling District electoral divisions of Bannockburn, Castle, Dounebraes, Menteith, Queensland, St Ninians, Strathendrick, Viewforth, and Wallace.

2005–2024: The Stirling council area.

The constituency covered the whole of the Stirling council area. Most of the area is rural, which has tended to vote Conservative, but there are some large towns in the East, most notably Stirling itself, which used to vote Labour, but has now moved towards SNP. A similar constituency, also called Stirling, is used by the Scottish Parliament.

== History ==
The area covered by the modern constituency was first represented in the British House of Commons in consequence of the Act of Union 1707 in 1708. The county town of Stirling was represented as part of Stirling Burghs and the county was represented by Stirlingshire, each returning one member.

In 1918, Stirling Burghs was abolished and Stirling was then represented by the Stirling & Falkirk Burghs and from 1974 Stirling, Falkirk & Grangemouth constituencies. Along with Clackmannanshire the county was meanwhile represented by Clackmannan and Eastern Stirlingshire and Stirling and Clackmannan Western (later Stirlingshire West).

A modern constituency of Stirling was established in 1983. In 2005 the west portion of Ochil was moved into Stirling.

== Constituency profile and voting patterns ==
=== Constituency profile ===
The seat was large, in Central Scotland and covered the Stirling council area.

Its population was concentrated around the historic City of Stirling and surrounding areas of Bannockburn, Bridge of Allan and Dunblane on its eastern fringes around the River Forth and its lower tributaries. This area consisted of a mixture of Conservative-leaning suburbs to the north and west, such as Bridge of Allan and Dunblane and the Stirling suburbs of Cambusbarron, Kings Park and Torbrex, and somewhat poorer SNP or Labour-voting areas such as Raploch and south-east Stirling, in addition to Bannockburn, and the villages of Cowie, Fallin and Plean south-east of the city.

Boundaries stretched up to the west following the Valleys of the River Forth and Teith, running up into the wooded glens of the Trossachs on the eastern side of the Loch Lomond and The Trossachs National Park, such as the more sparsely populated eastern shore of Loch Lomond, and it contained a variety of freshwater lochs, such as Loch Katrine and Loch Venachar.

A number of small villages dot the corridors of the A84, A85 and A811 roads, including Callander, widely recognised as the gateway to the Loch Lomond and The Trossachs National Park, and more widely as the gateway to the Scottish Highlands. These scenic areas have proven especially rich territory for successful Conservative candidates and campaigns, hosting many retirees and wealthy investors.

=== Voting patterns ===
When the Stirling constituency was first created for the 1983 general election, combining northern elements of the West Stirlingshire constituency with the town of Stirling from the Stirling, Falkirk and Grangemouth constituency and southern elements of the old Kinross and West Perthshire constituency it was thought of as a fairly safe Conservative seat, with Michael Forsyth winning the seat with a majority of 5,133 votes. It became a tight Labour-Conservative marginal in 1987, and again in 1992, being retained by Michael Forsyth with less than 1,000 votes at both elections.

Labour gained Stirling as part of their landslide victory in 1997, then held the seat and it's coterminous constituency of Stirling in the Scottish Parliament, usually with a majority of over 10% of the vote; until the SNP's breakthrough ten years later in 2007. Stirling remained under Labour's control at the 2010 general election; however, it was gained by Steven Paterson of the Scottish National Party in what was landslide victory for the SNP across Scotland in 2015. More recently, the Conservative Party have made gains in the area, coming second in the overlapping constituency of Stirling in the Scottish Parliament, and taking more votes than the SNP at the 2017 Stirling Council election. At the 2017 general election, Stephen Kerr of the Conservatives defeated Paterson by a narrow majority of 148 votes, becoming the first elected Conservative MP for Stirling in 25 years. Kerr was subsequently defeated by Alyn Smith in 2019.

Stirling voted against Scottish independence in 2014 on an above-average margin of 59.8% "No" 40.2% "Yes". At the European Union membership referendum on 23 June 2016, an above-average margin of 67.7% of the electorate in Stirling voted for the United Kingdom to remain a member of the European Union with 32.3% voting for the United Kingdom to leave the European Union.

== Members of Parliament ==
| Election | Member | Party |
|---|---|---|
| 1983 | Michael Forsyth | Conservative |
| 1997 | Dame Anne McGuire | Labour |
| 2015 | Steven Paterson | SNP |
| 2017 | Stephen Kerr | Conservative |
| 2019 | Alyn Smith | SNP |

== Elections ==
=== Elections of the 2010s ===
General election 2019: Stirling
| Party | Candidate | Votes | % | ±% |
|---|---|---|---|---|
| SNP | Alyn Smith | 26,895 | 51.1 | +14.3 |
| Conservative | Stephen Kerr | 17,641 | 33.5 | −3.6 |
| Labour | Mary-Kate Ross | 4,275 | 8.1 | −14.0 |
| Liberal Democrats | Fayzan Rehman | 2,867 | 5.4 | +2.0 |
| Green | Bryan Quinn | 942 | 1.8 | New |
| Majority | | 9,254 | 17.6 | N/A |
| Turnout | | 52,620 | 76.8 | +2.5 |
| SNP gain from Conservative | | Swing | +9.0 | |

This was the largest increase in the SNP's vote share at the 2019 general election.

General election 2017: Stirling
| Party | Candidate | Votes | % | ±% |
|---|---|---|---|---|
| Conservative | Stephen Kerr | 18,291 | 37.1 | +14.0 |
| SNP | Steven Paterson | 18,143 | 36.8 | −8.8 |
| Labour | Chris Kane | 10,902 | 22.1 | −3.4 |
| Liberal Democrats | Wendy Chamberlain | 1,683 | 3.4 | +0.7 |
| Women's Equality | Kirstein Rummery | 337 | 0.7 | New |
| Majority | | 148 | 0.3 | N/A |
| Turnout | | 49,356 | 74.3 | −3.2 |
| Conservative gain from SNP | | Swing | +11.4 | |

General election 2015: Stirling
| Party | Candidate | Votes | % | ±% |
|---|---|---|---|---|
| SNP | Steven Paterson | 23,783 | 45.6 | +28.3 |
| Labour | Johanna Boyd | 13,303 | 25.5 | −16.3 |
| Conservative | Stephen Kerr | 12,051 | 23.1 | −0.8 |
| Green | Mark Ruskell | 1,606 | 3.1 | +1.5 |
| Liberal Democrats | Elisabeth Wilson | 1,392 | 2.7 | −11.8 |
| Majority | | 10,480 | 20.1 | N/A |
| Turnout | | 52,135 | 77.5 | +6.7 |
| SNP gain from Labour | | Swing | +22.3 | |

General election 2010: Stirling
| Party | Candidate | Votes | % | ±% |
|---|---|---|---|---|
| Labour | Anne McGuire | 19,558 | 41.8 | +5.8 |
| Conservative | Bob H. Dalrymple | 11,204 | 23.9 | −1.2 |
| SNP | Alison J. Lindsay | 8,091 | 17.3 | +4.7 |
| Liberal Democrats | Graham Reed | 6,797 | 14.5 | −6.2 |
| Green | Mark Ruskell | 746 | 1.6 | −1.4 |
| UKIP | Paul Henke | 395 | 0.8 | +0.3 |
| Majority | | 8,354 | 17.9 | +7.0 |
| Turnout | | 46,791 | 70.8 | +3.1 |
| Labour hold | | Swing | +3.5 | |

=== Elections of the 2000s ===
General election 2005: Stirling
| Party | Candidate | Votes | % | ±% |
|---|---|---|---|---|
| Labour | Anne McGuire | 15,729 | 36.0 | −7.0 |
| Conservative | Stephen Kerr | 10,962 | 25.1 | +1.4 |
| Liberal Democrats | Kelvin Holdsworth | 9,052 | 20.7 | +9.2 |
| SNP | Frances McGlinchey | 5,503 | 12.6 | −4.5 |
| Green | Richard Illingworth | 1,302 | 3.0 | +0.9 |
| Scottish Socialist | Rowland Sheret | 458 | 1.0 | −1.7 |
| Independent | James McDonald | 261 | 0.6 | New |
| Christian Vote | Michael Willis | 215 | 0.5 | New |
| UKIP | Matthew Desmond | 209 | 0.5 | New |
| Majority | | 4,767 | 10.9 | −6.5 |
| Turnout | | 43,691 | 67.7 | +2.8 |
| Labour hold | | Swing | −4.2 | |

General election 2001: Stirling
| Party | Candidate | Votes | % | ±% |
|---|---|---|---|---|
| Labour | Anne McGuire | 15,175 | 42.2 | −5.2 |
| Conservative | Geoff Mawdsley | 8,901 | 24.8 | −7.7 |
| SNP | Fiona Macaulay | 5,877 | 16.4 | +3.0 |
| Liberal Democrats | Clive Freeman | 4,208 | 11.7 | +5.5 |
| Scottish Socialist | Charles Mullen | 1,012 | 2.8 | New |
| Green | Mark Ruskell | 757 | 2.1 | New |
| Majority | | 6,274 | 17.4 | +2.5 |
| Turnout | | 35,930 | 67.7 | −14.1 |
| Labour hold | | Swing | +1.2 | |

=== Elections of the 1990s ===
General election 1997: Stirling
| Party | Candidate | Votes | % | ±% |
|---|---|---|---|---|
| Labour | Anne McGuire | 20,382 | 47.4 | +8.8 |
| Conservative | Michael Forsyth | 13,971 | 32.5 | −6.7 |
| SNP | Ewan Dow | 5,752 | 13.4 | −1.1 |
| Liberal Democrats | Alistair Tough | 2,675 | 6.2 | +0.5 |
| UKIP | William McMurdo | 154 | 0.4 | New |
| Majority | | 6,411 | 14.9 | N/A |
| Turnout | | 42,958 | 81.8 | −0.5 |
| Labour gain from Conservative | | Swing | +7.8 | |

General election 1992: Stirling
| Party | Candidate | Votes | % | ±% |
|---|---|---|---|---|
| Conservative | Michael Forsyth | 19,174 | 40.0 | +1.7 |
| Labour | Catherine Phillips | 18,471 | 38.5 | +2.3 |
| SNP | Gerald Fisher | 6,558 | 13.7 | +3.0 |
| Liberal Democrats | William Robertson | 3,337 | 7.0 | −7.8 |
| Green | William Thomson | 342 | 0.7 | New |
| Monster Raving Loony | Ross Sharp | 68 | 0.1 | New |
| Majority | | 703 | 1.5 | −0.6 |
| Turnout | | 47,950 | 82.3 | +2.9 |
| Conservative hold | | Swing | | |

=== Elections of the 1980s ===
General election 1987: Stirling
| Party | Candidate | Votes | % | ±% |
|---|---|---|---|---|
| Conservative | Michael Forsyth | 17,591 | 38.3 | −1.7 |
| Labour | Michael Connarty | 16,643 | 36.2 | +8.3 |
| Liberal | Ian McFarlane | 6,804 | 14.8 | −9.1 |
| SNP | Iain Lawson | 4,897 | 10.7 | +2.5 |
| Majority | | 948 | 2.1 | −10.0 |
| Turnout | | 45,935 | 79.4 | +3.7 |
| Conservative hold | | Swing | | |

General election 1983: Stirling
| Party | Candidate | Votes | % | ±% |
|---|---|---|---|---|
| Conservative | Michael Forsyth | 17,039 | 40.0 | +2.8 |
| Labour | Michael Connarty | 11,906 | 27.9 | −7.7 |
| Liberal | Ross Finnie | 10,174 | 23.9 | +12.6 |
| SNP | William Houston | 3,488 | 8.2 | −7.7 |
| Majority | | 5,133 | 12.1 | +10.5 |
| Turnout | | 42,607 | 75.7 | |
| Conservative win (new seat) | | | | |
