= Anne McGuire =

Scottish politician

The Right Honourable Dame Anne McGuire DBE
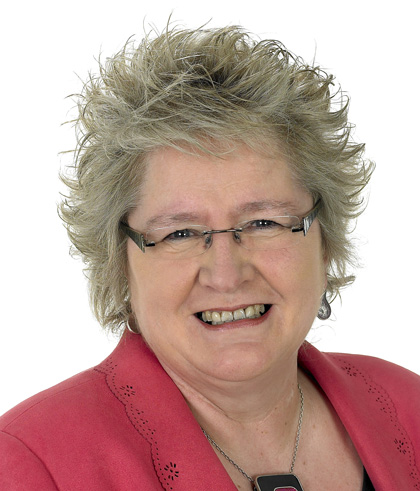
- McGuire in 2011

Parliamentary Under-Secretary of State for Disabled People
- In office 17 June 2005 – 5 October 2008
- Prime Minister: Tony Blair; Gordon Brown
- Preceded by: Maria Eagle
- Succeeded by: Jonathan Shaw

Parliamentary Under-Secretary of State for Scotland
- In office 29 May 2002 – 17 May 2005
- Prime Minister: Tony Blair
- Preceded by: George Foulkes
- Succeeded by: David Cairns

Lord Commissioner of the Treasury
- In office 12 June 2001 – 29 May 2002
- Prime Minister: Tony Blair
- Preceded by: Jim Dowd
- Succeeded by: Jim Fitzpatrick
Shadow portfolios
Shadow Minister for Disabled People
In office 8 October 2011 – 7 October 2013
Leader	Ed Miliband
Preceded by	Margaret Curran
Succeeded by	Kate Green
Parliamentary Private Secretary to the Leader of the Opposition
In office 10 October 2010 – 8 October 2011 Serving with: Chuka Umunna (2010–11); Michael Dugher (2011)
Leader	Ed Miliband
Preceded by	Desmond Swayne
Succeeded by	John Denham

Member of Parliament; for Stirling
- In office 1 May 1997 – 30 March 2015
- Preceded by: Michael Forsyth
- Succeeded by: Steven Paterson

Personal details
- Born: Anne Catherine Long; 26 May 1949 (age 77) Glasgow, Scotland
- Party: Labour
- Spouse: Len McGuire (m. 1972)
- Children: Sarah McGuire, Paul McGuire
- Education: University of Glasgow

Dame Anne Catherine McGuire DBE (née Long; born 26 May 1949) is a Scottish Labour Party politician who served as the Member of Parliament (MP) for Stirling from 1997 to 2015. She was the Parliamentary Under-Secretary of State for Scotland from 2002 to 2005 and Parliamentary Under-Secretary of State for Disabled People from 2005 to 2008.

== Early life ==
Born in Glasgow, McGuire was educated at the city's Our Lady and St Francis Secondary School (became part of St Mungo's Academy in 1988) on Charlotte Street and the University of Glasgow where she was awarded an MA in politics with history. She went on to study for teacher training at the Notre Dame College of Education (merged with Craiglockhart College in 1981 to become the St Andrew's College of Education, then became part of the Faculty of Education of the University of Glasgow in 1999) in Bearsden, gaining a Diploma in Secondary Education.

She worked in the University Court of the University of Glasgow as both a registrar and a secretary from 1971 to 1974. In 1983, she joined Community Service Volunteers (CSV), initially as a teacher, then as a fieldworker. She left the organisation in 1993 as its national officer. Upon leaving CSV, she became the deputy director of the Scottish Council for Voluntary Organisations, where she remained until her election to the UK Parliament in 1997.

She was the parliamentary election agent for Norman Hogg at the 1979 general election at Dunbartonshire East, when he ousted the Scottish National Party's MP Margaret Bain (later Ewing). She remained as Hogg's election agent for the 1983, 1987 and 1992 elections in his new Cumbernauld and Kilsyth constituency. She was elected a councillor on Strathclyde Regional Council in 1980 and served for two years. She was a member of the Scottish Labour Party Executive from 1984 until 1997 and Chair of the Scottish Labour Party from 1992 to 1993. From 1987 until 1991, she was a member of the national executive of the GMB Union.

== Parliamentary career ==
McGuire was selected to stand for election for Labour through an all-women shortlist. She was elected to the House of Commons at the 1997 general election when she ousted the then Secretary of State for Scotland Michael Forsyth by 6,411 votes. In the same year as her first election, she was rewarded by becoming the Parliamentary Private Secretary to Secretary of State for Scotland Donald Dewar. A year later, she joined the New Labour government when she was appointed as an assistant whip, becoming a Lord Commissioner to the Treasury in 2001. She became a Parliamentary Under-Secretary of State for Scotland in 2002, moving sideways to the Department for Constitutional Affairs in 2003. She served in the Department for Work and Pensions with responsibility for disabilities from 2005 to 2008. In October 2008, she stood down from the government and it was announced she would be appointed to the Privy Council.

On 10 October 2010, McGuire was appointed Parliamentary Private Secretary to Leader of the Opposition Ed Miliband, despite having backed his brother in the leadership campaign. She later asked to step down for the role in order to be able to speak more freely, and became Labour's spokesperson on disabilities again before announcing her decision to stand down at the next election.

She also served as a member of the Public Accounts Committee and as co-chair of the All-party group on Disability.

McGuire is a member of Labour Friends of Israel (LFI), becoming its chair in May 2013 and was described by LFI director Jennifer Gerber as "a true friend of Israel".

McGuire was appointed Dame Commander of the Order of the British Empire (DBE) in the 2015 New Year Honours.

McGuire was described by The Daily Telegraph as "the ultimate loyalist" for never having rebelled once in Parliament. She described votes over cutting benefits for single mothers as the closest she came to rebelling against the government and supporting the 2003 Iraq War most difficult decision she had to make.

== Personal life ==
McGuire married her husband, Len, on 12 February 1972 and they have a son and a daughter and live in Cumbernauld. She is a keen linguist and speaks French and Gaelic. She enjoys Ceilidh dancing and is honorary vice-president of Glasgow University Shinty Club.

Parliament of the United Kingdom
Preceded by Michael Forsyth	Member of Parliament for Stirling; 1997–2015	Succeeded by Steven Paterson
Political offices
Preceded by Maria Eagle	Parliamentary Under-Secretary of State for Disabled People; 2005–2008	Succeeded by Jonathan Shaw
Preceded by Margaret Curran	Shadow Minister for Disabled People; 2011–2013	Succeeded by Kate Green
