= 2012 Stirling Council election =

2012 Scottish local government election

← 2007	3 May 2012	2017 →

All 22 seats to Stirling Council 12 seats needed for a majority
	First party	Second party
Leader	Graham Houston	Corrie McChord
Party	SNP	Labour
Leader's seat	Dunblane and Bridge of Allan	Stirling East
Last election	7 seats, 29.2%	8 seats, 28.2%
Seats before	7	8
Seats won	9	8
Seat change	▲2	Steady
Popular vote	10,626	8,180
Percentage	37.2%	28.6%
Swing	▲8.0%	▲0.4%
	Third party	Fourth party
Leader	Alistair Berrill	Mark Ruskell
Party	Conservative	Scottish Green
Leader's seat	Forth and Endrick	Dunblane and Bridge of Allan
Last election	4 seats, 25.3%	0 seats, 1.7%
Seats before	4	0
Seats won	4	1
Seat change	Steady	▲1
Popular vote	5,689	1,658
Percentage	19.9%	5.8%
Swing	▼5.4%	▲4.1%
Council Leader before election
Graham Houston
SNP
Council Leader after election
Corrie McChord
Labour

The 2012 Stirling Council election was held on 3 May 2012, the same day as the 31 other local authorities in Scotland. The election used the seven wards created under the Local Governance (Scotland) Act 2004, with 22 councillors being elected. Each ward will elect either three or four members, using the STV electoral system.

The election saw the Scottish National Party increase their representation by 2 seats and significantly increase their vote share to become the largest party on the council. Labour and the Conservatives retained their 8 and 4 seats respectively while the Greens gained a seat on the authority. By contrast the Liberal Democrats lost all of their seats.

Following the election a coalition was formed between the Labour Party and the Conservatives which replaced the previous SNP minority administration.

== Results ==
2012 Stirling Council election result
Party	Seats	Gains	Losses	Net gain/loss	Seats %	Votes %	Votes	+/−
SNP	9	2	0	▲2	40.9	37.2	10,626	▲8.0
Labour	8	2	2	Steady	36.4	28.6	8,180	▲0.4
Conservative	4	0	0	Steady	18.2	19.9	5,689	▼5.4
Scottish Green	1	1	0	▲1	4.6	5.8	1,658	▲4.1
Liberal Democrats	0	0	3	▼3	0.0	5.5	1,562	▼6.0
UKIP	0	0	0	Steady	0.0	0.9	261	▲0.8
Independent	0	0	0	Steady	0.0	1.6	449	▼2.1

Note: "Votes" are the first preference votes. The net gain/loss and percentage changes relate to the result of the previous Scottish local elections on 3 May 2007. This may differ from other published sources showing gain/loss relative to seats held at dissolution of Scotland's councils.

== Ward results ==
=== Trossachs and Teith ===
- 2007: 1xSNP; 1xCon; 1xLab
- 2012: 2xSNP; 1xCon
- 2007-2012 Change: SNP gain from Lab

Trossachs and Teith – 3 seats
Party	Candidate	FPv%	Count					
Party	Candidate	FPv%	1	2	3	4	5	6
Conservative	Martin Earl	30.29%	1,285					
SNP	Alycia Hayes	23.76%	1,008	1,027.2	1,054.1	1,109.6		
SNP	Fergus Wood (incumbent)	21.28%	903	925.7	947.3	984.3	1,023.6	1,283.2
Labour	Gerry McGarvey	15.84%	672	690.3	732.5	804.1	808.1	
Independent	Jack Black	5.23%	222	260.2	307.7			
Liberal Democrats	Galen Milne	3.61%	153	199.9				
Electorate: 8,464 Valid: 4,243 Spoilt: 72 Quota: 1,061 Turnout: 4,315 (50.13%)

=== Forth and Endrick ===
- 2007: 1xLab; 1xSNP; 1xCon
- 2012: 2xSNP; 1xCon
- 2007-2012 Change: SNP gain one seat from Lab

Forth and Endrick – 3 seats
Party	Candidate	FPv%	Count						
Party	Candidate	FPv%	1	2	3	4	5	6	7
Conservative	Alistair Berrill (incumbent)	23.58%	1,097	1,128	1,198				
SNP	Graham Lambie (incumbent)	19.60%	912	927	944	945.2	1,016.3	1,041.4	1,171.4
SNP	Ian Muirhead	18.49%	860	894	928	929.3	991.4	1,020.4	1,201.7
Labour	Alistair William Weir	16.14%	751	788	824	824.9	917.0	982.4	
Conservative	Philip Graves	6.64%	309	328	356	383.2	408.7		
UKIP	Paul Henke	5.61%	261	271					
Scottish Green	Gordon Kerr Cowtan	5.55%	258	298	335	336.2			
Liberal Democrats	Alison McGilvray	4.39%	204						
Electorate: 8,464 Valid: 4,652 Spoilt: 56 Quota: 1,164 Turnout: 4,708 (48.79%)

=== Dunblane and Bridge of Allan ===
- 2007: 1xSNP; 1xCon; 1xLab; 1xLib Dem
- 2012: 1xSNP; 1xCon; 1xLab; 1xGRN
- 2007-2012 Change: GRN gain one seat from Lib Dem

Dunblane and Bridge of Allan – 4 seats
Party	Candidate	FPv%	Count				
Party	Candidate	FPv%	1	2	3	4	5
SNP	Graham Houston (incumbent)	27.31%	1,494				
Conservative	Callum Campbell (incumbent)	23.07%	1,262				
Labour	Mike Robbins	21.29%	1,165				
Scottish Green	Mark Ruskell	16.63%	910	951.1	981	1,006.1	1,251
Liberal Democrats	Gary Airnes	6.32%	346	368.4	427.1	442.4	
SNP	Ian Smith	5.37%	294	604.1	615.8	624.4	683.9
Electorate: 12,193 Valid: 5,471 Spoilt: 76 Quota: 1,095 Turnout: 5,547 (44.87%)

=== Castle ===
- 2007: 1xSNP; 1xLab; 1xLib Dem
- 2012: 2xLab; 1xSNP
- 2007-2012 Change: Lab gain one seat from Lib Dem

Castle – 3 seats
Party	Candidate	FPv%	Count						
Party	Candidate	FPv%	1	2	3	4	5	6	7
SNP	Jim Thomson (incumbent)	27.54%	828						
Labour	John Hendry (incumbent)	18.89%	568	570.1	581.2	606.5	643.2	673.3	759.8
Labour	Johanna Boyd	17.59%	529	530.6	544.7	556.5	588.3	631.3	748.1
Scottish Green	Zara Kitson	10.87%	327	331	366.5	409.9	497.3	575.7	
Conservative	Jennifer Gordon	8.71%	262	262.6	287.9	294.1	326.4		
Independent	Steve Sankey	7.55%	227	228.8	250.2	288.1			
SNP	David Wilson	4.72%	142	201.7	207.9				
Liberal Democrats	Graham Reed (incumbent)	4.12%	124	126.8					
Electorate: 7,843 Valid: 3,007 Spoilt: 67 Quota: 752 Turnout: 3,074 (38.34%)

=== Stirling West ===
- 2007: 1xSNP; 1xLab; 1xCon
- 2012: 1xLab; 1xSNP; 1xCon
- 2007-2012 Change: No change

Stirling West – 3 seats
Party	Candidate	FPv%	Count
Party	Candidate	FPv%	1
SNP	Scott Farmer	36.61%	1,484
Labour	Christine Simpson	31.01	1,257
Conservative	Neil Benny	25.04	1,015
Liberal Democrats	Gordon Bruce	7.35	298
Electorate: 8,611 Valid: 4,054 Spoilt: 44 Quota: 1,014 Turnout: 4,098 (47.08%)

=== Stirling East ===
- 2007: 1xSNP; 1xLab; 1xLib Dem
- 2012: 2xLab; 1xSNP
- 2007-2012: Change: Lab gain one seat from Lib Dem

Stirling East – 3 seats
Party	Candidate	FPv%	Count				
Party	Candidate	FPv%	1	2	3	4	5
SNP	Steven Paterson (incumbent)†	33.06	1,278				
Labour	Corrie McChord (incumbent)	22.30	862	925.8	961.6	992.2	
Labour	Danny Gibson	22.19	858	892.6	929.1	957.6	978.3
Liberal Democrats	Ian Alexander Brown (incumbent)	10.42	403	436.3	507.9	642	642.9
Conservative	Benjamin Kerr	7.81	302	320.5	333.2		
Scottish Green	Johannes Butscher	4.22	163	224.6			
Electorate: 8,611 Valid: 3,866 Spoilt: 77 Quota: 967 Turnout: 3,943 (41.09%)

=== Bannockburn ===
- 2007: 2xLab; 1xSNP
- 2012: 2xLab; 1xSNP
- 2007-2012 Change: No change

Bannockburn – 3 seats
Party	Candidate	FPv%	Count						
Party	Candidate	FPv%	1	2	3	4	5	6	7
SNP	Alasdair MacPherson (incumbent)	37.49%	1,236						
Labour	Margaret Brisley (incumbent)	34.36%	1,133						
Labour	Violet Weir (incumbent)	11.68%	385	409.9	664.7	671.4	704.6	766.1	910.1
SNP	Gerry McLaughlan	5.67%	187	516.2	527.3	531.6	549.9	596.6	
Independent	Bill McDonald	5.0%	165	181.3	190.8	203.6	259.6		
Conservative	Lesley Stein	4.76%	157	160.7	162.3	170.3			
Liberal Democrats	David Kaufman	1.0%	34	38.2	44.3				
Electorate: 8,611 Valid: 3,297 Spoilt: 118 Quota: 825 Turnout: 3,415 (40.8%)

== Aftermath ==
=== Stirling East by-election ===
On 7 May 2015, Stirling East SNP councillor Steven Paterson was elected as the MP for Stirling. He resigned his Council seat on 30 June 2015. A by-election was held on 1 October 2015 to fill the vacancy and the seat was held by the SNP's Gerry McLaughlan.

Stirling East By-election (1 October 2015) – 1 Seat
Party	Candidate	FPv%	Count		
Party	Candidate	FPv%	1	2	3
SNP	Gerry McLaughlan	45.2%	1,311	1,367	1,388
Labour	Chris Kane	37.7%	1,094	1,134	1,272
Conservative	Luke Davison	11.8%	343	352	
Scottish Green	Alasdair Tollemache	5.2%	152		
Electorate: 10,460 Valid: 2,900 Spoilt: 28 Quota: 1,451 Turnout: 2,928
