= Stirling West (ward) =

Electoral ward of Stirling, Scotland

Location of the ward

Stirling West is one of the seven wards used to elect members of the Stirling Council. It elects three Councillors.

== Councillors ==
Election	Councillors		
2007	Scott Farmer (SNP)	Andrew Simpson (Labour)	Neil Benny (Conservative)
2012	Scott Farmer (SNP)	Christine Simpson (Labour)	Neil Benny (Conservative)
2017	Scott Farmer (SNP)	Christine Simpson (Labour)	Neil Benny (Conservative)
2022	Scott Farmer (SNP)	Jen Preston (Labour)	Neil Benny (Conservative)

== Election results ==
=== 2022 Election ===
2022 Stirling Council election

Stirling West - 3 seats
Party	Candidate	FPv%	Count						
Party	Candidate	FPv%	1	2	3	4	5	6	7
Conservative	Neil Benny (incumbent)	23.8	1,313	1,334.0	1,364.0	2,041.0			
SNP	Scott Farmer (incumbent)	21.9	1,207	1,214.0	1,239.0	1,240.0	1,258.9	1,279.9	2,038.4
Labour	Jen Preston	20.0	1,100	1,118.0	1,268.0	1,302.0	1,509.2		
SNP	Morag Fulton	13.8	760	768.0	792.0	801.0	809.1	834.0	
Conservative	Alastair Pettigrew	13.3	730	742.0	762.0				
Liberal Democrats	Dick Moerman	5.2	285	296.0					
Scottish Family	Michael Willis	2.0	110						
Electorate: 10,192 Valid: 5,505 Spoilt: 95 Quota: 1,377 Turnout: 54.9%

=== 2017 Election ===
2017 Stirling Council election

Stirling West - 3 seats
Party	Candidate	FPv%	Count					
Party	Candidate	FPv%	1	2	3	4	5	6
Conservative	Neil Benny (incumbent)	39.5	2,076					
SNP	Scott Farmer (incumbent)	20.9	1,096	1,116.6	1,156.6	1,193.2	1,213.1	1,944.5
Labour	Christine Simpson (incumbent)	17.8	936	1,151.4	1,210.8	1,456.0		
SNP	Morag Fulton	12.8	671	676.5	755.2	786.5	805.3	
Green	Kevin Ralston	4.8	251	287.0				
Liberal Democrats	Robert Skilleter	4.2	221	411.4	480.9			
Electorate: 9,637 Valid: 5,251 Spoilt: 74 Quota: 1,313 Turnout: 55.3%

=== 2012 Election ===
2012 Stirling Council election

Stirling West - 3 seats
Party	Candidate	FPv%	Count
Party	Candidate	FPv%	1
SNP	Scott Farmer	36.61%	1,484
Labour	Christine Simpson	31.01	1,257
Conservative	Neil Benny	25.04	1,015
Liberal Democrats	Gordon Bruce	7.35	298
Electorate: 8,611 Valid: 4,054 Spoilt: 44 Quota: 1,014 Turnout: 4,098 (47.08%)

=== 2007 Election ===
2007 Stirling Council election

Stirling council election, 2007: Stirling West
Party	Candidate	FPv%	%	Seat	Count
SNP	Scott Farmer	1,674	30.2	1	1
Labour	Andrew Simpson	1,041	18.8	2	3
Conservative	Neil Benny	1,005	18.2	4	6
Conservative	Gerry Power	740	13.3		
Liberal Democrats	Gordon Bruce	699	12.6		
Labour	Christine Simpson	376	6.8		
