= Trossachs and Teith (ward) =

Electoral ward of Stirling, Scotland

Location of the ward

Trossachs and Teith is one of the seven wards used to elect members of the Stirling council. It elects three councillors.

== Councillors ==
Election	Councillors		
2007	Fergus Wood (SNP)	Paul Owens (Labour)	Tony Ffinch (Conservative)
2012	Fergus Wood (SNP)	Alycia Hayes (SNP)	Martin Earl (Conservative)
2017	Evelyn Tweed (SNP)	Jeremy McDonald (Conservative)	Martin Earl (Conservative)
2022	Gene Maxwell (SNP)	Elaine Watterson (Conservative)	Martin Earl (Conservative)

== Election results ==
=== 2022 election ===
Trossachs and Teith - 3 seats
Party	Candidate	FPv%	Count							
Party	Candidate	FPv%	1	2	3	4	5	6	7	8
Conservative	Martin Earl (incumbent)	37.8	2,031							
SNP	Gene Maxwell	19.2	1,031	1,053.0	1,054.0	1,064.7	1,238.4	1,377.5		
SNP	John Watson	14.2	761	773.5	774.5	785.5	874.2	945.2	974.7	
Labour	Josh Hamilton	9.1	491	530.6	534.9	610.1	764.2			
Green	Wendy Faulkner	8.3	444	480.2	485.5	537.6				
Conservative	Elaine Watterson	7.2	385	881.6	893.3	926.7	950.9	1,078.8	1,079.2	1,262.4
Liberal Democrats	Galen Milne	3.5	188	218.4	223.8					
Scottish Family	Dolores Hughes	0.8	41	46.1						
Electorate: 9,475 Valid: 5,372 Spoilt: 100 Quota: 1,344 Turnout: 57.8%

=== 2017 election ===
2017 Stirling Council election

Trossachs and Teith - 3 seats
Party	Candidate	FPv%	Count						
Party	Candidate	FPv%	1	2	3	4	5	6	7
Conservative	Martin Earl (incumbent)	38.1	2,027						
SNP	Evelyn Tweed	20.5	1,090	1,105.8	1,112.5	1,227.6	1,306.6	1,311.7	2,077.4
SNP	Fergus Wood (incumbent)	14.6	776	799.4	809.1	850.8	890.2	891.7	
Conservative	Jeremy McDonald	11.9	632	1,210.5	1,250.7	1,286.6	1,378.5		
Labour	Gerry McGarvey	6.1	326	342.2	391.3	478.6			
Green	Gordon Cowtan	5.4	286	296.3	347.7				
Liberal Democrats	Galen Milne	3.3	177	191.5					
Electorate: 9,147 Valid: 5,314 Spoilt: 118 Quota: 1,329 Turnout: 59.4%

=== 2012 election ===
2012 Stirling Council election

Trossachs and Teith - 3 seats
Party	Candidate	FPv%	Count					
Party	Candidate	FPv%	1	2	3	4	5	6
Conservative	Martin Earl	30.29%	1,285					
SNP	Alycia Hayes	23.76%	1,008	1,027.2	1,054.1	1,109.6		
SNP	Fergus Wood (incumbent)	21.28%	903	925.7	947.3	984.3	1,023.6	1,283.2
Labour	Gerry McGarvey	15.84%	672	690.3	732.5	804.1	808.1	
Independent	Jack Black	5.23%	222	260.2	307.7			
Liberal Democrats	Galen Milne	3.61%	153	199.9				
Electorate: 8,464 Valid: 4,243 Spoilt: 72 Quota: 1,061 Turnout: 4,315 (50.13%)

=== 2007 election ===
2007 Stirling Council election

Stirling council election, 2007: Trossachs and Teith
Party	Candidate	FPv%	%	Seat	Count
SNP	Fergus Wood	1,789	33.0	1	1
Conservative	Tony Ffinch	1,065	19.7	2	4
Labour	Paul Owens	839	15.5	3	4
Conservative	Mark Kenyon	782	14.4		
Liberal Democrats	Galen Milne	568	10.5		
Independent	Charles Grant	373	6.9		
