= 2003 Stirling Council election =

Council election

← 1999	1 May 2003	2007 →

All 22 seats to Stirling Council 12 seats needed for a majority
	First party	Second party
Party	Labour	Conservative
Last election	11	9
Seats won	12	10
Seat change	▲1	▲1
Popular vote	13,120	10,023
Percentage	36.2%	27.7%
Council Leader before election
Corrie McChord
Labour
Elected Council Leader
Corrie McChord
Labour

The 2003 Stirling Council election was held on 1 May 2003, the same day as the other Scottish local government elections.

== Results ==
2003 Stirling Council election result
Party	Seats	Gains	Losses	Net gain/loss	Seats %	Votes %	Votes	+/−
Labour	12	1	0	▲1	54.0	36.2	13,120	
Conservative	10	1	0	▲1	46.0	27.7	10.023	
SNP	0	0	2	▼2	0.0	21.3	7,722	
Liberal Democrats	0	0	0	Steady	0.0	12.9	4,679	
Independent	0	0	0	Steady	0.0	1.6	578	

== Ward results ==
Ward 1: Bridge of Allan
Party	Candidate	Votes	%
Conservative	J Holliday	647	36.2
Liberal Democrats	K Holdsworth	631	35.3
SNP	P Willis	268	15.0
Labour	A Gray	243	13.6
Conservative win			

Ward 2: Logie
Party	Candidate	Votes	%
Labour	C Finlay	389	29.5
Liberal Democrats	I MacFarlane	356	27.0
SNP	E MacKechnie	345	26.2
Conservative	A Kenyon	228	17.3
Labour gain from SNP		Swing	N/A

Ward 3: Wallace
Party	Candidate	Votes	%
Labour	J Paterson	630	37.7
SNP	J Thomson	493	29.5
Conservative	S Kerr	303	18.1
Liberal Democrats	W Galloway	246	14.7
Labour win			

Ward 4: Raploch
Party	Candidate	Votes	%
Labour	J Hendry	737	65.1
SNP	A Harlick	231	20.4
Conservative	R Lindsay	91	8.0
Liberal Democrats	H Cameron	73	6.4
Labour win			

Ward 5: Town Centre
Party	Candidate	Votes	%
Labour	C McChord	420	40.3
SNP	S Farmer	300	28.8
Liberal Democrats	P McEwan	222	21.3
Conservative	J Duthie	101	9.7
Labour win			

Ward 6: Argyll
Party	Candidate	Votes	%
Labour	C McKean	916	49.0
SNP	W Nicol	431	23.0
Conservative	B Nixon	303	16.2
Liberal Democrats	M Boland	221	11.8
Labour win			

Ward 7: Kings Park and Cambusbarron
Party	Candidate	Votes	%
Conservative	G Power	724	38.7
Labour	C Broadfoot	607	32.5
SNP	D Robinson	270	14.4
Liberal Democrats	G Nunn	269	14.4
Conservative win			

Ward 8: Torbrex
Party	Candidate	Votes	%
Conservative	E Harding	761	40.4
Labour	A Simpson	527	28.0
SNP	G Lambie	329	17.5
Liberal Democrats	G Reed	267	14.2
Conservative win			

Ward 9: Broomridge
Party	Candidate	Votes	%
Labour	D Thomson	756	48.6
SNP	P Lowry	413	26.6
Conservative	A Orr	256	16.5
Liberal Democrats	J Lynch	130	8.4
Labour win			

Ward 10: Borestone
Party	Candidate	Votes	%
Labour	P Kelly	613	50.9
SNP	L Reid	268	22.3
Conservative	A McCulloch	141	11.7
Liberal Democrats	G Bruce	96	8.0
Scottish Socialist	M Sutherland	86	7.1
Labour win			

Ward 11: Bannockburn West
Party	Candidate	Votes	%
Labour	T Coll	824	56.4
SNP	A Walker	409	28.0
Conservative	N Benny	228	15.6
Labour win			

Ward 12: Bannockburn East
Party	Candidate	Votes	%
Labour	M Brisley	834	50.8
SNP	A MacPherson	634	38.6
Conservative	H McCrea	175	10.7
Labour win			

Ward 13: Polmaise
Party	Candidate	Votes	%
Labour	T Hazel	954	66.2
SNP	D Lowry	310	21.5
Conservative	L Stein	178	12.3
Labour win			

Ward 14: Sauchenford
Party	Candidate	Votes	%
Labour	M O'Brien	682	41.2
Independent	T Brookes	506	30.5
SNP	J Duncan	330	19.9
Independent	R Liston	72	4.3
Conservative	J Stein	67	4.0
Labour win			

Ward 15: Dunblane West
Party	Candidate	Votes	%
Conservative	P Greenhill	789	41.8
Labour	M Craig	441	23.4
SNP	M Dewar	344	18.2
Liberal Democrats	G Milne	179	16.6
Conservative win			

Ward 16: Dunblane East
Party	Candidate	Votes	%
Conservative	A Dickson	887	43.6
Liberal Democrats	D Goss	467	23.0
Labour	D Bowker	396	19.5
SNP	C McHugh	283	13.9
Conservative win			

Ward 17: Highland
Party	Candidate	Votes	%
Conservative	A Finch	747	46.4
Labour	V Alexander	345	21.4
SNP	G McLaughlan	340	21.1
Liberal Democrats	C Milne	179	11.1
Conservative gain from SNP		Swing	N/A

Ward 18: Teith
Party	Candidate	Votes	%
Conservative	P Nelson	650	43.3
SNP	K Reid	333	22.2
Liberal Democrats	K Anderson	285	19.0
Labour	H McClung	234	15.6
Conservative win			

Ward 19: Trossachs
Party	Candidate	Votes	%
Conservative	A Beaton	547	33.4
SNP	F Wood	454	27.7
Labour	P Owens	376	23.0
Liberal Democrats	J Cummins	260	15.9
Conservative win			

Ward 20: Campsies
Party	Candidate	Votes	%
Conservative	D Lonsdale	811	43.7
SNP	T Inglis	429	23.1
Labour	I Fraser	399	21.5
Liberal Democrats	D Hammerton	218	11.7
Conservative win			

Ward 21: Strathendrick
Party	Candidate	Votes	%
Labour	C O'Brien	1,163	57.5
Conservative	M Kenyon	547	27.0
SNP	J Taggart	233	11.5
Liberal Democrats	E Haydock	80	4.0
Labour win			

Ward 22: Blane Valley
Party	Candidate	Votes	%
Conservative	A Berrill	842	39.8
Labour	C Riches	634	30.0
Liberal Democrats	J Vass	365	17.2
SNP	J Aitken	275	13.0
Conservative win			
