= Stirling (council area) =

Council area of Scotland

Stirling: Sruighlea (Scottish Gaelic); Stirlin (Scots)
- Council area
- Coat of arms

- Stirling shown within Scotland
- Coordinates: 56.5000°N 4.0000°W
- Sovereign state: United Kingdom
- Country: Scotland
- Lieutenancy area: Stirling and Falkirk
- Incorporated: 16 May 1975
- Unitary authority: 1 April 1996
- Named for: Stirling
- Administrative HQ: Stirling

Government
  - Type: Council
  - Body: Stirling Council
  - Control: No overall control
  - MPs: Chris Kane (L)
  - MSPs: Keith Brown (SNP); Evelyn Tweed (SNP)

Area
  - Total: 844 sq mi (2,186 km^{2})
  - Rank: 9th

Population (2025)
  - Total: 94,040
  - Rank: 25th
  - Density: 110/sq mi (43/km^{2})
- Time zone: UTC+0 (GMT)
  - Summer (DST): UTC+1 (BST)
- ISO 3166 code: GB-STG
- GSS code: S12000030
- Website: stirling.gov.uk

The Stirling council area (Scots: Stirlin; Scottish Gaelic: Sruighlea) is one of the 32 council areas of Scotland, and has an estimated population of 94,040 (2025). It was created in 1975 as a lower-tier district within the Central region. The district covered parts of the historic counties of Stirlingshire and Perthshire, which were abolished for local government purposes. In 1996 the Central region was abolished and Stirling Council took over all local government functions within the area.

The administrative centre of the area is the city of Stirling, with the headquarters at Old Viewforth.

The area borders the council areas of Clackmannanshire (to the east), North Lanarkshire (to the south), Falkirk (to the south east), Perth and Kinross (to the north and north east), Argyll and Bute (to the north and north west), and both East and West Dunbartonshire to Stirling's southwest.

The majority of the population of the area is located in its southeast corner, in the city of Stirling and in the surrounding lowland communities: Bridge of Allan and Dunblane to the north, Bannockburn to the immediate south, and the three former coal mining communities of Cowie, Fallin, and Plean, known collectively as the "Eastern Villages".

The rest of the council area's population is sparsely distributed across the rural, mainly highland, expanse in the north and west of the area. The southern half of this rural area comprises the flat western floodplain of the River Forth, bounded on the south by the Touch Hills and the Campsie Fells. North of the glen lie the Trossachs mountains, and the northern half of the council area is generally mountainous in character.

== History ==
Stirling district was created in 1975 under the Local Government (Scotland) Act 1973, which abolished Scotland's counties, burghs and landward districts and replaced them with upper-tier regions and lower-tier districts. Stirling was one of three districts within the Central region. As created in 1975 the Stirling district covered five districts from Stirlingshire and four districts from Perthshire, which were all abolished at the same time:

From Perthshire:

- Callander Burgh
- Doune Burgh
- Dunblane Burgh
- Western District, except Ardoch (which went to Perth and Kinross)

From Stirlingshire:

- Bridge of Allan Burgh
- Central No. 1 District
- Stirling Burgh
- Western No. 1 District
- Western No. 2 District

The new district and its neighbour Falkirk were together made a new Stirling and Falkirk lieutenancy area. The last Lord Lieutenant of Stirlingshire became the first Lord Lieutenant of Stirling and Falkirk.

Local government was reformed again in 1996 under the Local Government etc. (Scotland) Act 1994, which abolished the regions and districts which had been created in 1975, replacing them with unitary council areas. Central Region was abolished and each of the area's three districts, including Stirling, became council areas. Stirling District Council was therefore replaced by the current Stirling Council.

== Demography ==
=== Languages ===
The 2022 Scottish Census reported that out of 90,451 residents aged three and over, 27,348 (30.2%) considered themselves able to speak or read the Scots language, 148 people (0.29%) reported Scots was their "main language".

The 2022 Scottish Census reported that out of 90,449 residents aged three and over, 1,202 (1.3%) considered themselves able to speak or read Gaelic, five people (0.01%) reported Gaelic was their "main language".

== Governance ==
Stirling Council Comhairle Shruighlea

Leadership
- Provost: Rosemary Fraser, SNP since 10 November 2025
- Leader: Susan McGill, SNP since 10 November 2025
- Chief Executive: Brian Roberts since June 2025

Structure
- Seats: 23 councillors
- Graph of the party split among 23 seats.
- Political groups: Administration (12) SNP (10) Green (1) Independent (1) Other parties (11) Conservative (7) Labour (4)

Elections
- Voting system: Single transferable vote
- Last election: 5 May 2022
- Next election: 6 May 2027

Meeting place
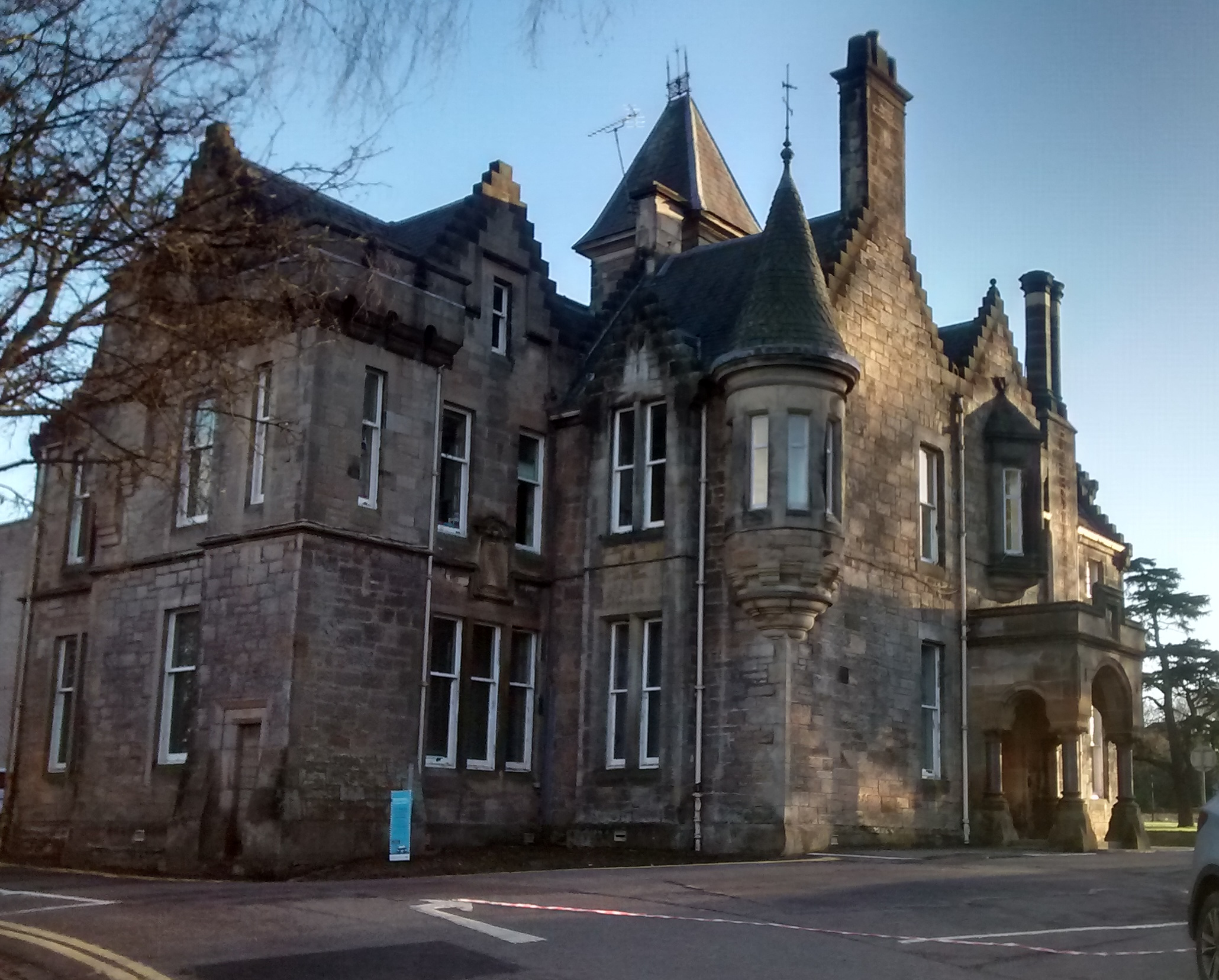
- Old Viewforth, Pitt Terrace, Stirling, FK8 2ET

Website
- www.stirling.gov.uk

=== Political control ===
The council has been under no overall control since 2007. Following the 2022 election a Labour minority administration formed to run the council. Efforts by the Scottish National Party as the largest party on the council to take over the leadership in February 2025 were unsuccessful, with the council narrowly voting for the Labour minority administration to continue. In October 2025 the SNP gained a seat following a by-election in Stirling East, and in November 2025 a deal was agreed between the SNP and Green and independent councillors to take control of the council.

The first election to Stirling District Council was held in 1974, initially operating as a shadow authority alongside the outgoing authorities until the new system came into force on 16 May 1975. A shadow authority was again elected in 1995 ahead of the change to council areas which came into force on 1 April 1996. Political control since 1975 has been as follows:

Stirling District Council

Party in control	Years
No overall control	1975–1984
Labour	1984–1988
No overall control	1988–1996

Stirling Council

Party in control	Years
Labour	1996–1999
No overall control	1999–2003
Labour	2003–2007
No overall control	2007–present

=== Leadership ===
The role of provost is largely ceremonial in Stirling. They chair full council meetings and act as the council's civic figurehead. Political leadership is provided by the leader of the council. The first leader of the council, Corrie McChord, had been the last leader of the Central Regional Council. The leaders since 1996 have been:

Councillor	Party	From	To
Corrie McChord	Labour	1 Apr 1996	12 Mar 2008
Graham Houston	SNP	12 Mar 2008	May 2012
Corrie McChord	Labour	17 May 2012	28 Feb 2013
Johanna Boyd	Labour	28 Feb 2013	May 2017
Scott Farmer	SNP	24 May 2017	May 2022
Chris Kane	Labour	19 May 2022	12 Sep 2024
Margaret Brisley	Labour	12 Sep 2024	27 Oct 2024
Gerry McGarvey	Labour	6 Feb 2025	10 Nov 2025
Susan McGill	SNP	10 Nov 2025	

=== Composition ===
Following the 2022 election and subsequent by-elections and changes of allegiance up to October 2026, the composition of the council was:

Party	Seats
SNP	10
Conservative	7
Labour	4
Green	1
Independent	1
Total	23

The next full council election is due in 2027.

=== Premises ===
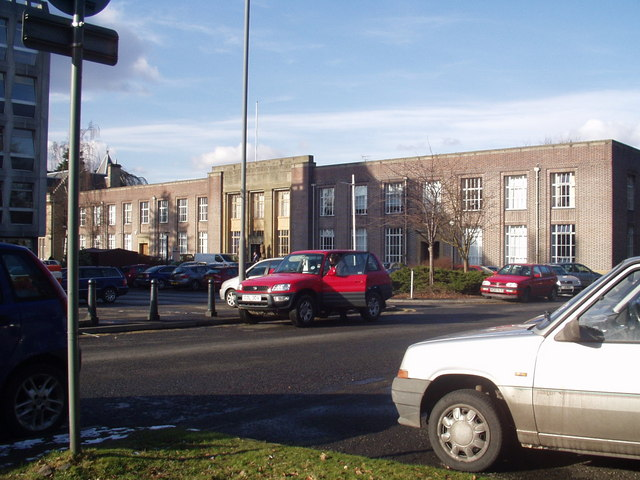
Old Viewforth: The 1937 wing behind the original house

The council is based at Old Viewforth on Pitt Terrace in Stirling. The oldest part of the building is a converted house called Viewforth, which had been built in 1855. The house was bought by Stirlingshire County Council in 1931 for £5,250 and converted to become its headquarters. A large art deco extension was added to the rear of the house, opening in 1937. A new building called New Viewforth was built alongside the older premises in 1972, shortly before Stirlingshire County Council was abolished.

Between 1975 and 1996 the premises at Viewforth served as the headquarters of Central Regional Council, whilst Stirling District Council was based at the Municipal Buildings at 8–10 Corn Exchange Road in Stirling, which had been completed in 1918 for the old Stirling Town Council. On local government reorganisation in 1996 Stirling Council took over Viewforth. The 1972 building known as New Viewforth was demolished in 2014.

== Elections ==
Since 2007 elections have been held every five years under the single transferable vote system, introduced by the Local Governance (Scotland) Act 2004. Election results since 1995 have been as follows:

Year	Seats	SNP	Conservative	Labour	Green	Liberal Democrats	Independent / Other	Notes
1995	22	2	7	13	0	0	0	
1999	22	2	9	11	0	0	0	New ward boundaries.
2003	22	0	10	12	0	0	0	
2007	22	7	4	8	0	3	0	New ward boundaries.
2012	22	9	4	8	1	0	0	
2017	23	9	9	4	1	0	0	New ward boundaries.
2022	23	8	7	6	1	0	1	Labour minority administration with Conservative support.

=== Wards ===
Map of the area's wards (2017 configuration)

The wards are:

Ward Number	Ward Name	Location	Seats
1	Trossachs and Teith		3
2	Forth and Endrick		3
3	Dunblane and Bridge of Allan		4
4	Stirling North		4
5	Stirling West		3
6	Stirling East		3
7	Bannockburn		3

== Communities ==
The area is divided into 42 community council areas, all of which have community councils as at 2023.

- Arnprior
- Balfron
- Balquhidder, Lochearnhead and Strathyre
- Bannockburn
- Braehead and Broomridge
- Bridge of Allan
- Buchanan
- Buchlyvie
- Callander
- Cambusbarron
- Cambuskenneth
- Carron Valley and District
- Causewayhead
- Cornton
- Cowie
- Croftamie
- Drymen
- Dunblane
- Fintry
- Gargunnock
- Gartmore
- Hillpark and Milton
- Killearn
- Killin
- Kilmadock
- King's Park
- Kippen
- Logie
- Mercat Cross
- Plean
- Polmaise
- Port of Menteith
- Raploch
- Riverside
- St Ninians
- Strathard
- Strathblane
- Strathfillan
- Thornhill and Blairdrummond
- Throsk
- Torbrex
- Trossachs

== Settlements ==
The largest settlements in Stirling council area

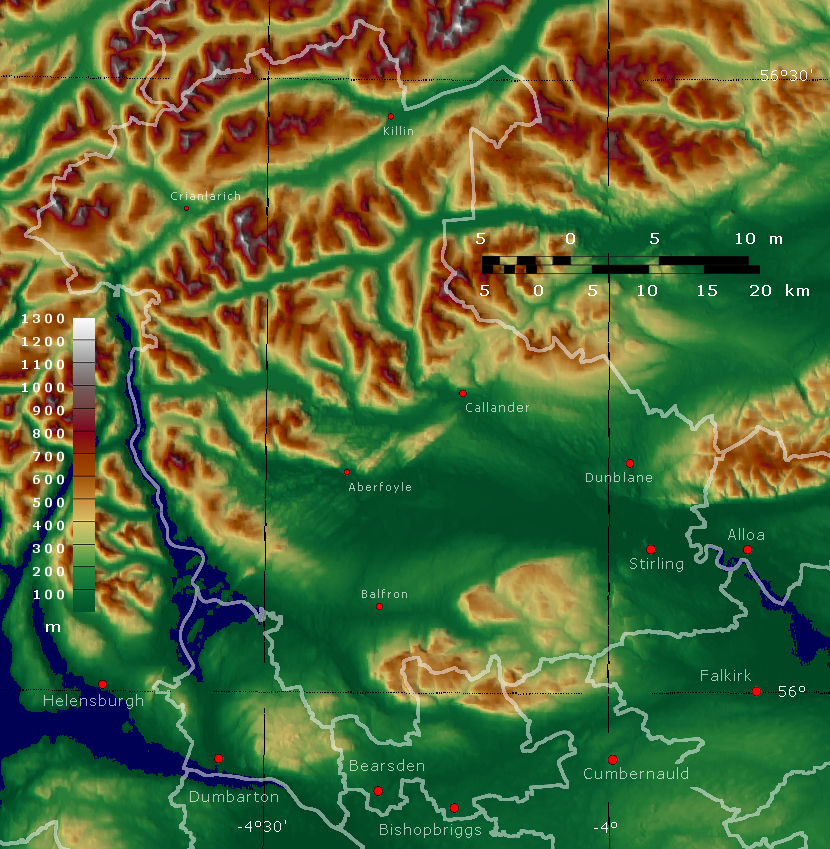
Topographic map of Stirling and East and West Dunbartonshire

As well as the city of Stirling itself, there are many towns, villages and hamlets spread across the council area, as well as dispersed settlements.

Largest settlements by population:

Settlement	Population (2020)
Stirling	37,910
Dunblane	9,310
Bannockburn	6,720
Bridge of Allan	5,320
Callander	3,080
Fallin	2,850
Cowie	2,720
Doune	2,200
Balfron	2,140
Strathblane	2,000

=== Towns ===
- Bannockburn
- Bridge of Allan
- Callander
- Doune
- Dunblane

=== Villages ===
- Aberfoyle
- Ashfield
- Balfron
- Balmaha
- Balquhidder
- Blairlogie
- Blanefield
- Buchlyvie
- Cambusbarron
- Cambuskenneth
- Cowie
- Crianlarich
- Croftamie
- Deanston
- Drymen
- Fallin
- Fintry
- Gargunnock
- Gartmore
- Killearn
- Killin
- Kinlochard
- Kippen
- Milton of Buchanan
- Lochearnhead
- Plean
- Port of Menteith
- Strathblane
- Strathyre
- Thornhill
- Throsk
- Tyndrum

=== Hamlets ===
- Ardchullarie More
- Ardeonaig
- Arnprior
- Auchlyne
- Balfron Station
- Boquhan
- Buchanan Smithy
- Carbeth
- Dumgoyne
- Gartness
- Inverarnan
- Kilmahog
- Kinbuck
- Milton
- Mugdock
- Stronachlachar

=== Dispersed settlements ===
- Ardchyle
- Auchtubh
- Blair Drummond
- Brig o' Turk
- Dalmary
- Dalrigh
- Inversnaid
- Rowardennan
- Ruskie

== Accidents and disasters ==
In 1996, the Dunblane massacre occurred at Dunblane Primary School in Dunblane. 16 five-six-year-old pupils and one teacher were killed in a mass shooting, in which the perpetrator also killed himself. It remains the deadliest mass shooting in British history. Dunblane Cemetery contains a memorial garden, where a number of the victims are buried and a fountain with a plaque of the names of those killed.

== Places of interest ==
- Carse of Lecropt
- Culcreuch Castle
- Inchmahome Priory (a ruined Augustinian priory on an island in the Lake of Menteith, used as a refuge in 1547 by Mary, Queen of Scots)
- Breadalbane Folklore Centre
- Cambuskenneth Abbey (formerly the seat of the Scottish Parliament)
- Doune Castle
- Dunblane Cathedral
- Falls of Dochart
- Falls of Lochay
- Glen Dochart
- Glenfinlas
- Lake of Menteith
- Lecropt Kirk
- Loch Achray
- Loch Ard
- Loch Earn
- Loch Lomond and the Trossachs National Park
- Loch Katrine (The source of most of the drinking water for the city of Glasgow)
- Loch Rusky
- Loch Venachar
- Moirlannich Longhouse
- Queen Elizabeth Forest Park (run by Forestry and Land Scotland)
- Scottish Institute of Sport (on the grounds of Stirling University)
- Stirling Castle
- The University of Stirling
- The Trossachs
- Wallace Monument
- West Highland Way
