= Bannockburn (ward) =

Electoral ward of Stirling, Scotland

Location of the ward

Bannockburn is one of the seven wards used to elect members of the Stirling Council. It elects three Councillors.

== Councillors ==
Election	Councillors		
2007	Alasdair MacPherson (SNP/ Ind.)	Margaret Brisley (Labour)	Gerard O'Brien (Labour)
2012	Alasdair MacPherson (SNP/ Ind.)	Margaret Brisley (Labour)	Violet Weir (Labour)
2017	Alasdair MacPherson (SNP/ Ind.)	Margaret Brisley (Labour)	Maureen Bennison (SNP/ Alba)
2021	Alasdair MacPherson (SNP/ Ind.)	Margaret Brisley (Labour)	Maureen Bennison (SNP/ Alba)
2022	Alasdair MacPherson (SNP/ Ind.)	Margaret Brisley (Labour)	Brian Hambly (SNP)
2024	Alasdair MacPherson (SNP/ Ind.)	Vacant	Brian Hambly (SNP)
2025	Alasdair MacPherson (SNP/ Ind.)	Bob Buchanan (SNP)	Brian Hambly (SNP)

== Election results ==
=== 2022 Election ===
2022 Stirling Council election

Bannockburn - 3 seats
Party	Candidate	FPv%	Count							
Party	Candidate	FPv%	1	2	3	4	5	6	7	8
Independent	Alasdair MacPherson (incumbent)	26.0	955							
Labour	Margaret Brisley (incumbent)	20.7	762	770.1	775.3	794.8	813.3	839.8	900.8	1,188.2
SNP	Brian Hambly	20.4	749	755.2	756.3	764.6	786.9	1,085.1		
Conservative	Stuart McLuckie	19.1	702	705.1	717.2	731.5	737.6	739.6	743.9	
SNP	Diane Tortolano	8.3	306	310.1	313.1	320.2	345.8			
Green	Marie Stadtler	2.4	87	88.8	93.0	101.1				
Liberal Democrats	Hilary MacPherson	2.1	77	78.5	81.6					
Scottish Family	Sophie Hendry	1.1	41	41.9						
Electorate: 8,777 Valid: 3,679 Spoilt: 64 Quota: 920 Turnout: 42.6%

=== 2017 Election ===
2017 Stirling Council election

Bannockburn - 3 seats
Party	Candidate	FPv%	Count						
Party	Candidate	FPv%	1	2	3	4	5	6	7
SNP	Alasdair MacPherson (incumbent)	24.9	871	880					
Labour	Margaret Brisley (incumbent)	23.9	837	854	854.3	871.3	1,093.3		
SNP	Maureen Bennison	20.5	718	722	725.2	765.3	779.3	813.1	913.9
Conservative	Paul Henke	18.3	640	653	653.1	662.1	683.1	723.4	
Labour	Violet Weir (incumbent)	7.7	271	274	274.1	292.2			
Green	Jennifer Tollemache	3.0	104	113	113.1				
Liberal Democrats	Gordon Bruce	1.8	62						
Electorate: 8,672 Valid: 3,503 Spoilt: 124 Quota: 876 Turnout: 41.8%

=== 2012 Election ===
2012 Stirling Council election

Bannockburn - 3 seats
Party	Candidate	FPv%	Count						
Party	Candidate	FPv%	1	2	3	4	5	6	7
SNP	Alasdair MacPherson (incumbent)	37.49%	1,236						
Labour	Margaret Brisley (incumbent)	34.36%	1,133						
Labour	Violet Weir (incumbent)	11.68%	385	409.9	664.7	671.4	704.6	766.1	910.1
SNP	Gerry McLaughlan	5.67%	187	516.2	527.3	531.6	549.9	596.6	
Independent	Bill McDonald	5.0%	165	181.3	190.8	203.6	259.6		
Conservative	Lesley Stein	4.76%	157	160.7	162.3	170.3			
Liberal Democrats	David Kaufman	1.0%	34	38.2	44.3				
Electorate: 8,611 Valid: 3,297 Spoilt: 118 Quota: 825 Turnout: 3,415 (40.8%)

=== 2007 Election ===
2007 Stirling Council election

Stirling council election, 2007: Bannockburn
Party	Candidate	FPv%	%	Seat	Count
SNP	Alasdair MacPherson	1,469	31.9	1	1
Labour	Margaret Brisley	1,376	29.8	2	1
Labour	Gerard O'Brien	883	19.1	3	3
Conservative	Alistair McCulloch	323	7.0		
Independent	Stephen Evans	216	4.7		
Liberal Democrats	David Smith	164	3.6		
