= Dunblane and Bridge of Allan (ward) =

Electoral ward of Stirling, Scotland

Location of the ward

Dunblane and Bridge of Allan is one of the seven wards used to elect members of the Stirling Council in Scotland. It elects four Councillors.

== Councillors ==
Election	Councillors			
2007	Graham Houston (SNP)	Colin Finlay (Labour)	Callum Campbell (Conservative)	David Goss (Liberal Democrats)
2012	Graham Houston (SNP)	Mike Robbins (Labour)	Callum Campbell (Conservative)	Mark Ruskell (Greens)
2017	Graham Houston (SNP)	Alastair Majury (Conservative)	Douglas Dodds (Conservative)	Alasdair Tollemache (Greens)
2022	Graham Houston (SNP)	Ewan Dillon (Labour, later Ind.)	Douglas Dodds (Conservative)	Alasdair Tollemache (Greens)
2023 (by-elections)	Robin Kleinman (Conservative)	Ewan Dillon (Labour, later Ind.)	Douglas Dodds (Conservative)	Alasdair Tollemache (Greens)
2024 (by-elections)	Robin Kleinman (Conservative)	Ewan Dillon (Labour, later Ind.)	Thomas Heald (Conservative)	Alasdair Tollemache (Greens)

== Election results ==
=== 2023 Dunblane and Bridge of Allan by-election ===
In December 2022, SNP councillor Graham Houston died. A by-election was held on 16 March 2023 and was won by Conservative candidate Robin Kleinman.

Dunblane and Bridge of Allan by-election (16 March 2023) – 1 seat
Party	Candidate	FPv%	Count					
Party	Candidate	FPv%	1	2	3	4	5	6
Conservative	Robin Kleinman	41.0	1,832	1,849	1,861	1,959	2,172	2,473
SNP	Ahsan Khan	26.9	1,202	1,205	1,416	1,491	1,683	
Labour	David Wilson	13.4	600	609	670	871		
Liberal Democrats	Dick Moerman	8.9	399	404	475			
Green	Clare Andrews	8.7	389	390				
Scottish Family	Nickie Willis	1.1	50					
Electorate: 11,792 Valid: 4,074 Spoilt: 26 Quota: 2,237 Turnout: 38.1%

=== January 2024 Dunblane and Bridge of Allan by-election ===
On 8 November 2023, Conservative councillor Douglas Dodds resigned his seat, citing "personal and health reasons." A by-election was on 25 January 2024 and was won by Conservative candidate Thomas Heald.

Dunblane and Bridge of Allan by-election (25 January 2024) – 1 seat
Party	Candidate	FPv%	Count					
Party	Candidate	FPv%	1	2	3	4	5	6
Conservative	Thomas Heald	37.8	1,644	1,653	1,714	1,738	1,998	2,286
SNP	Ahsan Khan	23.3	1,000	1,006	1,037	1,266	1,531	
Labour	David Wilson	20.2	869	874	989	1,147		
Green	Clare Andrews	10.1	433	442	485			
Liberal Democrats	Dick Moerman	6.8	292	296				
Scottish Family	Michael Willis	1.2	50					
Electorate: 11,778 Valid: 4,288 Spoilt: 27 Quota: 2,145 Turnout: 36.6%

=== August 2024 Dunblane and Bridge of Allan by-election ===
In May 2024, independent councillor Ewan Dillon resigned after pleading guilty to the possession of indecent images. A by-election was held on 15 August 2024 to elect his replacement, and was won by Labour candidate David Wilson.

Dunblane and Bridge of Allan by-election (15 August 2024) – 1 seat
Party	Candidate	FPv%	Count					
Party	Candidate	FPv%	1	2	3	4	5	6
Conservative	Stuart McLuckie	27.9	1,143	1,214	1,284	1,328	1,361	
Labour	David Wilson	23.3	952	981	1,101	1,390	1,826	2,252
SNP	John Watson	18.8	770	793	826	1,076		
Green	Andrew Adam	16.1	659	670	760			
Liberal Democrats	Dick Moerman	8.4	345	382				
Independent	Alastair Majury	5.5	225					
Electorate: 12,057 Valid: 4,094 Spoilt: 21 Quota: 2,048 Turnout: 34.1%

=== 2022 election ===
Dunblane and Bridge of Allan - 4 seats
Party	Candidate	FPv%	Count									
Party	Candidate	FPv%	1	2	3	4	5	6	7	8	9	10
Conservative	Douglas Dodds (incumbent)	21.6	1,536									
SNP	Graham Houston (incumbent)	17.8	1,266	1,268.0	1,269.0	1,293.0	1,317.3	1,815.3				
Green	Alasdair Tollemache (incumbent)	16.0	1,138	1,141.0	1,147.0	1,156.0	1,207.5	1,260.5	1,466.4			
Labour	Ewan Dillon	11.9	842	846.9	850.9	856.9	901.1	910.1	957.4	971.2	1,330.5	1,577.0
Liberal Democrats	Fayzan Rehman	9.4	665	669.2	674.2	674.2	748.3	760.3	785.6	799.6		
Conservative	Willy Stirling	8.4	598	686.2	701.4	705.4	819.0	819.0	823.3	824.9	956.0	
SNP	Ahsan Khan	7.9	564	564.2	564.2	569.2	581.2					
Independent	Alastair George Majury (incumbent)	5.3	377	382.2	387.2	396.2						
Alba	Bill Cowan	0.9	61	61.1	64.1							
Scottish Family	Nickie Willis	0.7	50	50.3								
Electorate: 11,911 Valid: 7,097 Spoilt: 102 Quota: 1,420 Turnout: 60.4%

=== 2017 election ===
2017 Stirling Council election

Dunblane and Bridge of Allan - 4 seats
Party	Candidate	FPv%	Count						
Party	Candidate	FPv%	1	2	3	4	5	6	7
Conservative	Alastair Majury	22.1	1,543						
Conservative	Douglas Dodds	21.5	1,502						
SNP	Graham Houston (incumbent)	17.2	1,203	1,205.4	1,208.3	1,250.0	1,885.6		
Green	Alasdair Tollemache	10.1	706	717.2	727.1	883.5	950.6	1,218.4	1,763.6
Labour	Mike Robbins (incumbent)	11.8	824	849.8	866.3	1,053.3	1,076.4	1,143.4	
SNP	Rosemary Hunter	10.4	723	724.4	724.6	741.8			
Liberal Democrats	Stuart Auld	6.8	476	512.0	536.0				
Electorate: 11,484 Valid: 6,977 Spoilt: 123 Quota: 1,396 Turnout: 61.8%

=== 2012 election ===
2012 Stirling Council election

Dunblane and Bridge of Allan - 4 seats
Party	Candidate	FPv%	Count				
Party	Candidate	FPv%	1	2	3	4	5
SNP	Graham Houston (incumbent)	27.31%	1,494				
Conservative	Callum Campbell (incumbent)	23.07%	1,262				
Labour	Mike Robbins	21.29%	1,165				
Green	Mark Ruskell	16.63%	910	951.1	981	1,006.1	1,251
Liberal Democrats	Gary Airnes	6.32%	346	368.4	427.1	442.4	
SNP	Ian Smith	5.37%	294	604.1	615.8	624.4	683.9
Electorate: 12,193 Valid: 5,471 Spoilt: 76 Quota: 1,095 Turnout: 5,547 (44.87%)

=== 2007 election ===
2007 Stirling Council election

2007 Stirling council election: Dunblane and Bridge of Allan - 4 seats
Party	Candidate	FPv%	%	Seat	Count
SNP	Graham Houston	1,794	22.8	1	1
Conservative	Callum Campbell	1,455	18.5	2	4
Labour	Colin Finlay	1,294	16.5	4	6
Liberal Democrats	David Goss	1,067	13.6	3	6
Conservative	Helen McCrea	801	10.2		
Independent	Bill Baird	707	9.0		
Green	Duncan Illingworth	675	8.6		
Scottish Socialist	Jennifer Haston	69	0.9		
