= Stirling East (ward) =

Electoral ward of Stirling, in Scotland

Location of the ward

Stirling East is one of the seven wards used to elect members of the Stirling Council. It elects three Councillors.

== Councillors ==
Election	Councillors		
2007	Steven Paterson (SNP)	Corrie McChord (Labour)	Ian Brown (Liberal Democrats)
2012	Steven Paterson (SNP)	Corrie McChord (Labour)	Ian Brown (Liberal Democrats)
2017	Allison Laurie (SNP)	Chris Kane (Labour)	Bryan Flanagan (Conservative)
2022	Gerry McLaughlan (SNP)	Chris Kane (Labour)	Bryan Flanagan (Conservative)
2024	Gerry McLaughlan (SNP)	Willie Ferguson (SNP)	Bryan Flanagan (Conservative)
2025	Gerry McLaughlan (SNP)	Willie Ferguson (SNP)	Josh Fyvie (SNP)

== Election results ==
=== 2025 by-election ===
In August 2025, Conservative councillor Bryan Flannagan resigned. A by-election was held on 30 October 2025 and was won by SNP candidate Josh Fyvie.

Stirling East by-election (30 October 2025) - 1 seat
Party	Candidate	FPv%	Count					
Party	Candidate	FPv%	1	2	3	4	5	6
SNP	Josh Fyvie	36.4	808	813	827	905	988	1,245
Labour	Yvonne Dickson	23.9	530	540	577	622	710	
Reform	William Docherty	23.3	517	523	572	578		
Conservative	James Corbett	6.6	147	156				
Green	Marie Stadtler	6.3	141	158	167			
Liberal Democrats	William Galloway	3.6	79					
Electorate: 8,662 Valid: 2,222 Spoilt: 28 Quota: 1,112 Turnout: 26.0%

=== 2022 Election ===
2022 Stirling Council election

Stirling East - 3 seats
Party	Candidate	FPv%	Count					
Party	Candidate	FPv%	1	2	3	4	5	6
SNP	Gerry McLaughlan	30.7	1,177					
Conservative	Bryan Flannagan (incumbent)	23.3	893	895.0	905.0	925.0	931.2	999.2
Labour	Chris Kane (incumbent)	21.6	829	839.4	848.4	877.7	933.9	1,019.6
SNP	Grant Thoms	8.0	306	488.4	497.4	502.2	578.7	650.0
Independent	Gary McGrow	7.9	303	305.8	310.8	323.0	359.7	
Green	Linda Hendry	4.7	182	189.8	194.1	213.9		
Liberal Democrats	Gordon Murphy	2.4	91	93.2	98.2			
Scottish Family	David Tortolano	1.4	53	53.6				
Electorate: 8,587 Valid: 3,834 Spoilt: 71 Quota: 959 Turnout: 45.5%

=== 2017 Election ===
2017 Stirling Council election

Stirling East - 3 seats
Party	Candidate	FPv%	Count						
Party	Candidate	FPv%	1	2	3	4	5	6	7
SNP	Alison Laurie	24.2	916	920	962				
Conservative	Bryan Flanagan	21.3	806	825	833	833.2	848.2	883.0	1060.0
Labour	Chris Kane	19.8	751	768	797	797.7	1,153.8		
SNP	Gerry McLaughlan (incumbent)	17.9	678	680	705	717.9	739.0	774.8	
Labour	Corrie McChord (incumbent)	11.0	416	427	440	440.3			
Green	Linda Hendry	3.3	125	150					
Liberal Democrats	William Galloway	2.5	94						
Electorate: 8,479 Valid: 3,786 Spoilt: 93 Quota: 947 Turnout: 45.7%

=== 2012 Election ===
2012 Stirling Council election

Stirling East - 3 seats
Party	Candidate	FPv%	Count				
Party	Candidate	FPv%	1	2	3	4	5
SNP	Steven Paterson (incumbent)†	33.06	1,278				
Labour	Corrie McChord (incumbent)	22.30	862	925.8	961.6	992.2	
Labour	Danny Gibson	22.19	858	892.6	929.1	957.6	978.3
Liberal Democrats	Ian Alexander Brown (incumbent)	10.42	403	436.3	507.9	642	642.9
Conservative	Benjamin Kerr	7.81	302	320.5	333.2		
Green	Johannes Butscher	4.22	163	224.6			
Electorate: 8,611 Valid: 3,866 Spoilt: 77 Quota: 967 Turnout: 3,943 (41.09%)

=== 2007 Election ===
2007 Stirling Council election

Stirling council election, 2007: Stirling East
Party	Candidate	FPv%	%	Seat	Count
SNP	Steven Paterson	1,821	32.9	1	1
Labour	Corrie McChord	1,396	25.2	2	1
Labour	Charles McKean	779	14.0		
Liberal Democrats	Ian Brown	765	13.8	3	4
Conservative	Helen Scott	764	13.8		
