= Stephen Kerr =

Scottish Conservative politician

Stephen Kerr MSP
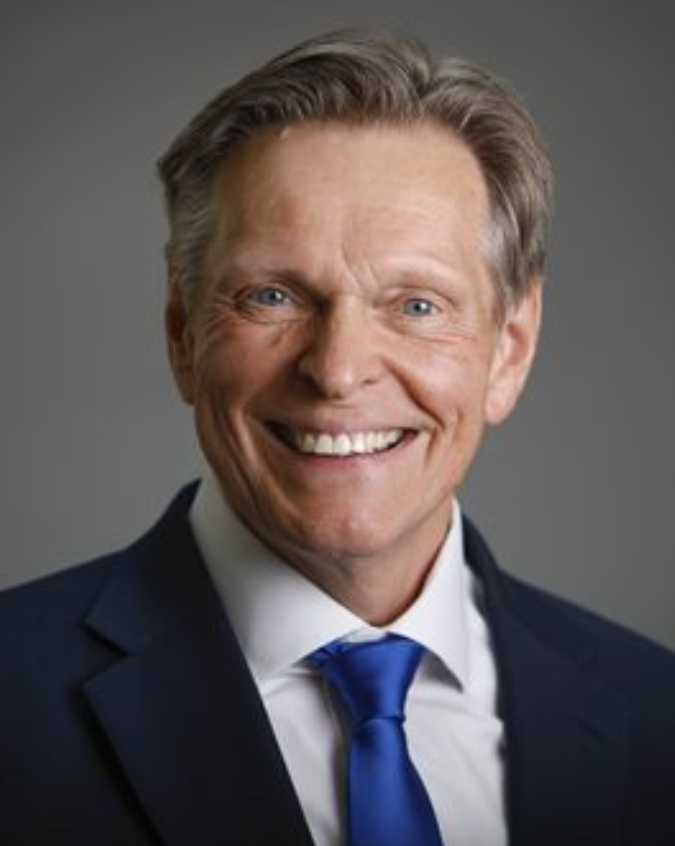
- Official portrait, 2026

Member of the Scottish Parliament for Mid Scotland and Fife (1 of 7 Regional MSPs)
- Incumbent
- Assumed office 7 May 2026

Member of the Scottish Parliament for Central Scotland (1 of 7 Regional MSPs)
- In office 6 May 2021 – 9 April 2026

Member of Parliament for Stirling
- In office 8 June 2017 – 6 November 2019
- Preceded by: Steven Paterson
- Succeeded by: Alyn Smith

Scottish conservative portfolios
- 2021–2022: Chief Whip of the Scottish Conservative Party
- 2022–2023: Shadow Cabinet Secretary for Education and Skills
- 2026–present: Shadow Cabinet Secretary for Justice

Personal details
- Born: Stephen Charles Kerr; 26 September 1960 (age 65) Dundee, Scotland
- Party: Conservative
- Spouse: Yvonne Kerr (m. 1983)
- Children: 4
- Education: University of Stirling

Stephen Charles Kerr (born 26 September 1960) is a Scottish Conservative & Unionist politician, currently serving as a Member of the Scottish Parliament for Mid Scotland and Fife, previously serving in the Central Scotland Region from 2021 up until 2026. From 2021 to 2022, Kerr served as the Convener of the Education, Children and Young People Committee. Prior to his election to Holyrood, Kerr was the Member of Parliament for Stirling from 2017 to 2019.

Kerr attended the University of Stirling and worked for Kimberly Clark before his election to the House of Commons. He was the Conservative candidate in Stirling in 2005 and 2015 but was defeated by Labour and the SNP, respectively. He eventually gained the seat in 2017 with a narrow majority over Steven Paterson. However, he was defeated by Alyn Smith in 2019.

Listed number one on the Scottish Conservative Central Scotland regional list, Kerr was elected at the 2021 Scottish Parliament election.

In 2023, Kerr was selected as the Scottish Conservative candidate for the new UK Parliament Angus and Perthshire Glens constituency, for the 2024 United Kingdom general election.

== Early life and career ==
Kerr was born in Dundee and raised on a council estate in Forfar, Angus. He attended a local primary school and later, Forfar Academy, before leaving at 16 to work as a bank junior. He graduated from the University of Stirling with an honours degree in business. Kerr's career has largely been spent working in business, mainly in sales and marketing. His role immediately prior to his election involved heading the sales teams for Kimberly Clark in the UK, Ireland and France.

== Member of Parliament for Stirling ==
Kerr was the Conservative Party candidate in Stirling at both the 2005 and 2015 general elections; where he lost to Labour the first time, and the SNP the second time before he eventually gained the seat in 2017 with a narrow majority of 148 votes (0.3%) over Steven Paterson of the SNP.

Kerr signed a letter to the Prime Minister on 16 February 2018, making suggestions about the way Britain should leave the European Union.

Kerr founded the APPG for Professional Sales as Chairman, in June 2018. It published a report into the sales capabilities of SMEs in October 2019, making 24 recommendations on how to help SMEs to improve their sales capabilities. The launch event was keynoted by Kelly Tolhurst, Small Businesses Minister.

In July 2018, Kerr unveiled replicas of the John Allan Stones at the Stirling Smith Art Gallery and Museum. The stones were originally placed on Albany Crescent, a now-demolished row of houses near the Stirling City Centre. Although the original stones were taken to the United States by David O. McKay, who had seen them while serving as a Mormon missionary, following the houses being knocked down, they remained a part of Stirling's history through their association with Stirling architect John Allan. The motto "What e're thou art, act well thy part" inscribed on the stones inspired McKay to continue his work as a missionary, and as such became known across the Church for their inspiring qualities. The originals can still be found in the church's Missionary Training Center in Provo, Utah. The replica stones were carved by Doune Stonemasons James Innes and Son.

Kerr was defeated by the SNP's Alyn Smith in the 2019 general election. Smith won the seat from Kerr with a majority of 9,254 votes (17.6%).

== Member of the Scottish Parliament ==
Kerr topped the Scottish Conservative list for Central Scotland in the 2021 Scottish Parliament election, and also sought election in the Falkirk West constituency. He took 18.5% of the vote in Falkirk West, placing him a distant third. Having been unsuccessful on the constituency vote, the Conservatives were entitled to three seats on the Central Scotland list, with Kerr being elected, alongside Graham Simpson and Meghan Gallacher. He took his seat on 10 May 2021. Upon his election, Kerr was given the role of Chief Whip for the Scottish Conservatives in Holyrood, replacing Miles Briggs.

On the 28 May, Kerr used his maiden speech to urge the Cabinet Secretary for Health, Humza Yousaf, to speed up rollout of the COVID-19 vaccine. He was later elected as convenor of the Education, Skills and Young People committee on 23 June.

On 12 January 2022, Kerr called for Boris Johnson to resign as Conservative party leader and Prime Minister over the Westminster lockdown parties controversy along with a majority of Scottish Conservative MSPs.

In a mini-reshuffle in September 2022, Kerr was moved to be the Shadow Secretary for Education and Skills, shadowing Shirley-Anne Somerville. He was replaced as Scottish Conservative Chief Whip by Alexander Burnett.

In January 2023, Kerr wrote an article for the Daily Telegraph calling on reforms of the Scottish Parliament to offer greater scrutiny of the Scottish Government, arguing that Holyrood proceedings were "rigorously controlled" by Scottish Ministers and accused SNP backbenchers of "scripted questions". Kerr's article sparked debate across Scotland, with Kerr's arguments being supported by former SNP Government ministers.

Kerr caused controversy on 14 April 2023 in a now deleted tweet when he suggested transgender people have learning disabilities and has since apologised.

As Shadow Secretary for Education and Skills, Kerr called for many reforms within Scottish Education, including a new deal for teachers. Kerr highlighted the rise in violent attacks in the classroom, successfully persuading the Government to hold a national discussion to address this problem.

Kerr gained internet fame as "A Potato With More Vitamin C Than a Lemon" after debating motion S6M-05292 at the Scottish Parliament entitled "Stephen Kerr: A Potato With More Vitamin C Than a Lemon".

In June 2023, Kerr was announced as the Conservative candidate for the new Angus and Perthshire Glens seat ahead of the 2024 general election. In the election, he finished second to Dave Doogan of the SNP, taking 14,272 votes (30.1%).

On 14 August 2024, Kerr accidentally published doubts about his endorsed candidate Murdo Fraser in the leadership election as a status update on WhatsApp.

As of October 2024, Kerr is a member of the Constitution, Europe, External Affairs, and Culture Committee at Holyrood.

Kerr stood in Stirling at the 2026 Scottish Parliament election. He came second behind former Member of Parliament Alyn Smith, taking 19.2% of the vote. Kerr was instead elected as a regional MSP for Mid Scotland and Fife, after being placed second on the party list.

== Personal life ==
Kerr has lived in the Stirling area since 1982. He and his wife, Yvonne, were married in 1983 and they are the parents of four children. They have lived in Bridge of Allan since the 1980s. He is a member of The Church of Jesus Christ of Latter-day Saints and has served in a number of positions in the church, including as a missionary in London during his youth and an area seventy from 2006 to 2013. Among other assignments while an area seventy, Kerr was president of the Church's first pageant held in Britain.

Parliament of the United Kingdom
Preceded by Steven Paterson	Member of Parliament for Stirling; 2017–2019	Succeeded by Alyn Smith
