= 2007 Stirling Council election =

2007 Scottish local government election

← 2003	3 May 2007	2012 →

All 22 seats to Stirling Council 12 seats needed for a majority
	First party	Second party
Party	Labour	SNP
Last election	12 seats, 36.2%	0 seats, 21.3%
Seats won	8	7
Seat change	▼4	▲7
Popular vote	11,112	11,529
Percentage	28.2%	29.2%
Swing	▼8.0%	▲7.9%
	Third party	Fourth party
Party	Conservative	Liberal Democrats
Last election	10 seats, 27.7%	0 seats, 12.9%
Seats won	4	3
Seat change	▼6	▲3
Popular vote	9,992	4,542
Percentage	25.3%	11.5%
Swing	▼2.4%	▼1.4%

The 2007 Stirling Council election was held on 3 May 2007, the same day as the other Scottish local government elections and the Scottish Parliament general election. The election was the first one using seven new wards created as a result of the Local Governance (Scotland) Act 2004. Each ward elected three or four councillors using the single transferable vote system form of proportional representation. The new wards replaced 22 single-member wards which used the plurality (first past the post) system of election.

== Results ==
2007 Stirling Council election result
Party	Seats	Gains	Losses	Net gain/loss	Seats %	Votes %	Votes	+/−
Labour	8	-	-	▼4	36.4	28.2	11,112	
SNP	7	-	-	▲7	31.8	29.2	11,529	
Conservative	4	-	-	▼6	18.2	25.3	9,992	
Liberal Democrats	3	-	-	▲3	13.6	11.5	4,542	
Independent	0	-	-	Steady	0.0	3.7	1,442	
Green	0	-	-	Steady	0.0	1.7	675	
Scottish Socialist	0	-	-	Steady	0.0	0.2	69	
UKIP	0	-	-	Steady	0.0	0.1	58	

== Ward results ==
Stirling council election, 2007: Trossachs and Teith
Party	Candidate	FPv%	%	Seat	Count
SNP	Fergus Wood	1,789	33.0	1	1
Conservative	Tony Ffinch	1,065	19.7	2	4
Labour	Paul Owens	839	15.5	3	4
Conservative	Mark Kenyon	782	14.4		
Liberal Democrats	Galen Milne	568	10.5		
Independent	Charles Grant	373	6.9		

Stirling council election, 2007: Forth and Endrick
Party	Candidate	FPv%	%	Seat	Count
Labour	Colin O'Brien	1,705	26.0	1	1
SNP	Graham Lambie	1,500	22.9	2	4
Conservative	Alistair Berrill	1,281	19.6	3	5
Conservative	David Lonsdale	1,180	18.0		
Liberal Democrats	Rona Sutherland	823	12.6		
UKIP	Paul Henke	58	0.9		

Stirling council election, 2007: Dunblane and Bridge of Allan
Party	Candidate	FPv%	%	Seat	Count
SNP	Graham Houston	1,794	22.8	1	1
Conservative	Callum Campbell	1,455	18.5	2	4
Labour	Colin Finlay	1,294	16.5	4	6
Liberal Democrats	David Goss	1,067	13.6	3	6
Conservative	Helen McCrea	801	10.2		
Independent	Bill Baird	707	9.0		
Green	Duncan Illingworth	675	8.6		
Scottish Socialist	Jennifer Haston	69	0.9		

Stirling council election, 2007: Castle
Party	Candidate	FPv%	%	Seat	Count
SNP	Jim Thomson	1,482	36.1	1	1
Labour	John Hendry	1,083	26.4	2	1
Conservative	Lesley Stein	596	14.5		
Liberal Democrats	Graham Reed	456	11.1	3	5
Labour	Frances Junnier	340	8.3		
Independent	James McDonald	146	3.6		

Stirling council election, 2007: Stirling West
Party	Candidate	FPv%	%	Seat	Count
SNP	Scott Farmer	1,674	30.2	1	1
Labour	Andrew Simpson	1,041	18.8	2	3
Conservative	Neil Benny	1,005	18.2	3	6
Conservative	Gerry Power	740	13.3		
Liberal Democrats	Gordon Bruce	699	12.6		
Labour	Christine Simpson	376	6.8		

Stirling council election, 2007: Stirling East
Party	Candidate	FPv%	%	Seat	Count
SNP	Steven Paterson	1,821	32.9	1	1
Labour	Corrie McChord	1,396	25.2	2	1
Labour	Charles McKean	779	14.0		
Liberal Democrats	Ian Brown	765	13.8	3	4
Conservative	Helen Scott	764	13.8		

Stirling council election, 2007: Bannockburn
Party	Candidate	FPv%	%	Seat	Count
SNP	Alasdair MacPherson	1,469	31.9	1	1
Labour	Margaret Brisley	1,376	29.8	2	1
Labour	Gerard O'Brien	883	19.1	3	3
Conservative	Alistair McCulloch	323	7.0		
Independent	Stephen Evans	216	4.7		
Liberal Democrats	David Smith	164	3.6		

== By-elections since 2007 ==
- Labour's Bannockburn councillor Gerard O'Brien resigned, having been found guilty of breaches of the Councillors Code of Conduct. Violet Weir held the seat for the party on 30 April 2009.

Bannockburn by-election (30 April 2009) - 1 seat
Party	Candidate	FPv%	Count						
Party	Candidate	FPv%	1	2	3	4	5	6	7
Labour	Violet Weir	39.89	1,131	1,134	1,141	1,162	1,175	1,196	1,288
SNP	Bill McDonald	37.64	1,067	1,072	1,078	1,095	1,110	1,162	1,228
Independent	Tommy Brookes	8.08	229	232	235	240	272	303	
Conservative	Catherine Berrill	6.10	173	176	178	194	201		
Independent	Breda O'Brien	3.14	89	94	96	99			
Liberal Democrats	Ethne Brown	2.89	82	83	91				
Green	Duncan Illingsworth	1.27	36	36					
Independent	Paul Campbell	0.99	28						
Labour hold		Swing							
Electorate: 8,170 Valid: 2,835 Quota: 1,419 Turnout: 34.7%
