= Raploch =

Coordinates: 56°07′47″N 3°56′50″W

Raploch: Scottish Gaelic: An Raplach; Scots: The Raploch
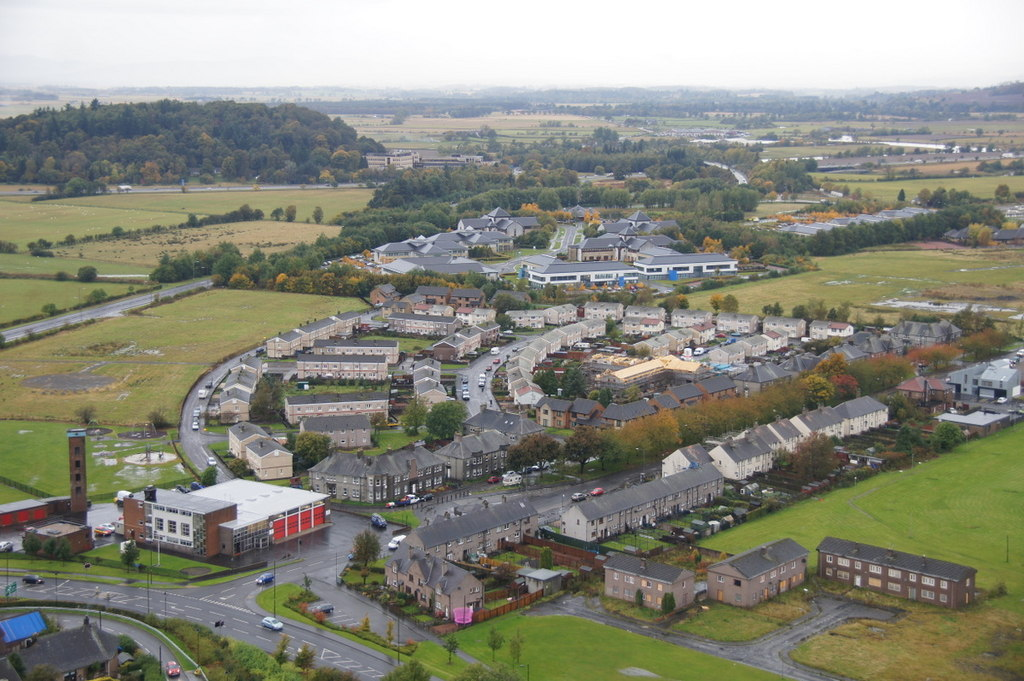
- Raploch (viewed from Stirling Castle)

- Location within the Stirling council area
- Population: 3,636
- Council area: Stirling
- Country: Scotland
- Sovereign state: United Kingdom
- Post town: STIRLING
- Postcode district: FK8
- Dialling code: 01786
- Police: Scotland
- Fire: Scottish
- Ambulance: Scottish
- UK Parliament: Stirling
- Scottish Parliament: Stirling

Raploch, known locally as The Raploch or The Raptap, is a district of the city of Stirling, which lies to the south of the River Forth in central Scotland.

The first houses were built in the late 17th century, after the land had been sold by the Earl of Mar to the patrons of Cowane's Hospital in Stirling. Economic conditions led to stagnation but housing began again in earnest at the start of the 19th century.

The real expansion came in the middle of the 20th century, when council housing replaced decrepit housing in the old town.

The Raploch was the subject of a 2002 BBC Scotland documentary entitled Raploch Stories, and in a 2017 sequel Raploch Stories Revisited.

Since 2004, the Raploch area has undergone a great deal of physical regeneration, overseen by the Raploch Urban Regeneration Company. The Scottish government has praised Raploch's masterplanning as an example of good practice. Conditions which ensured access to training and employment for previously long-term unemployed workers in regeneration work have also been well-received.

In 2008 the area became the home of the UK's first El Sistema children's orchestra, called Big Noise Raploch. A children's orchestra with over 100 members, who performed with Gustavo Dudamel and the Simón Bolívar Symphony Orchestra of Venezuela on 21 June 2012 and on a BBC Scotland Christmas Eve (2012) Special in Stirling's Holy Rude Church.

After the Second World War, there were great efforts to develop Stirling's housing including at Raploch by the Scottish Special Housing Association.

== People ==
Perhaps one of the most notable people to have come from the district is football legend Billy Bremner, who also attended the local St. Mary's Roman Catholic primary school. A more recent football star from Raploch is David Goodwillie.
