= 2022 Stirling Council election =

2022 Scottish local government election

- 5 May 2022

All 23 seats to Stirling Council 12 seats needed for a majority
	First party	Second party	Third party
Leader	Scott Farmer	Neil Benny	Danny Gibson
Party	SNP	Conservative	Labour
Leader's seat	Stirling West	Stirling West	Stirling North
Last election	9 seats, 34.7%	9 seats, 37.2%	4 seats, 16.2%
Seats before	8	9	4
Seats won	8	7	6
Seat change	▼1	▼2	▲2
Popular vote	12,196	11,522	5,899
Percentage	33.3%	31.5%	16.1%
Swing	▼1.4%	▼5.7%	▼0.1%
	Fourth party	Fifth party
Leader	Alasdair Tollemache	Alasdair MacPherson
Party	Green	Independent
Leader's seat	Dunblane and Bridge of Allan	Bannockburn
Last election	1 seat, 6.6%	0 seat, 2.0%
Seats before	1	2
Seats won	1	1
Seat change	Steady	▲1
Popular vote	2,546	2,103
Percentage	7.0%	5.7%
Swing	▲0.4%	▲2.4%
- The 7 multi-member wards
Council Leader before election
Scott Farmer
SNP
Council Leader after election
Chris Kane
Labour

Elections to Stirling Council were held on 5 May 2022, the same day as the 31 other local authorities in Scotland. The election used the seven wards created under the Local Governance (Scotland) Act 2004, with 23 councillors being elected. Each ward elected either 3 or 4 members, using the STV electoral system.

The election saw Labour increase their representation on the council by two. The SNP lost one seat and the Greens retained their single seat. The Conservatives saw their representation on the council drop by two seats. The Liberal Democrats failed to win representation and one independent candidate won a seat.

== Background ==
=== Previous election ===
At the previous election in 2017, the Conservatives won 9 seats, an increase of 5 and a vote share increase of 17.2%. Also on 9 seats was the SNP. Next were Labour, who won the next largest amount of seats, winning 4. The sole Green councillor, also held their seat. In the aftermath of the 2017 election a new coalition was agreed between the SNP and Labour with Labour Councillor Christine Simpson becoming Provost of Stirling and the SNP's Graham Houston becoming depute convener of the council.

2017 Stirling Council election result
Party	Seats	Vote share
Conservative	9	37.2%
SNP	9	34.7%
Labour	4	16.2%
Green	1	6.6%

=== Electoral system ===
The election used the 7 wards created following the fifth statutory review of electoral arrangements conducted by Local Government Boundary Commission for Scotland in 2016, with 23 councillors elected. Each ward elected either three or four councillors, using the single transferable vote (STV) electoral system – a form of proportional representation – where candidates are ranked in order of preference.

== Results ==
2022 Stirling Council election result
Party	Seats	Gains	Losses	Net gain/loss	Seats %	Votes %	Votes	+/−
SNP	8	0	1	▼1	34.8	33.3	12,196	▼1.4
Conservative	7	0	2	▼2	30.4	31.5	11,522	▼5.7
Labour	6	2	0	▲2	26.1	16.1	5,899	▼0.1
Green	1	0	0	Steady	4.3	7.0	2,546	▲0.4
Independent	1	1	0	▲1	4.3	5.7	2,103	▲2.4
Liberal Democrats	0	0	0	Steady	0.0	5.0	1,841	▲1.7
Scottish Family	0	0	0	Steady	0.0	1.2	428	New
Alba	0	0	0	Steady	0.0	0.2	61	New
Total	23						36,596	

Note: "Votes" are the first preference votes. The net gain/loss and percentage changes relate to the result of the previous Scottish local elections on 4 May 2017. This may differ from other published sources showing gain/loss relative to seats held at dissolution of Scotland's councils.

== Ward results ==
=== Trossachs and Teith ===
- 2017: 2xCon; 1xSNP
- 2022: 2xCon; 1xSNP
- 2017-2022: No change

Trossachs and Teith - 3 seats
Party	Candidate	FPv%	Count							
Party	Candidate	FPv%	1	2	3	4	5	6	7	8
Conservative	Martin Earl (incumbent)	37.8	2,031							
SNP	Gene Maxwell	19.2	1,031	1,053.0	1,054.0	1,064.7	1,238.4	1,377.5		
SNP	John Watson	14.2	761	773.5	774.5	785.5	874.2	945.2	974.7	
Labour	Josh Hamilton	9.1	491	530.6	534.9	610.1	764.2			
Green	Wendy Faulkner	8.3	444	480.2	485.5	537.6				
Conservative	Elaine Watterson	7.2	385	881.6	893.3	926.7	950.9	1,078.8	1,079.2	1,262.4
Liberal Democrats	Galen Milne	3.5	188	218.4	223.8					
Scottish Family	Dolores Hughes	0.8	41	46.1						
Electorate: 9,475 Valid: 5,372 Spoilt: 100 Quota: 1,344 Turnout: 57.8%

=== Forth and Endrick ===
- 2017: 2xCon; 1xSNP
- 2022: 1xCon; 1xSNP; 1xLab
- 2017-2022 Change: 1 Lab gain from Con

Forth and Endrick - 3 seats
Party	Candidate	FPv%	Count						
Party	Candidate	FPv%	1	2	3	4	5	6	7
SNP	Rosemary Fraser	24.1	1,451	1,454.0	1,484.0	1,570.0			
Conservative	Paul Henke	18.8	1,130	1,140.0	1,180.0	1,272.0	1,272.4	1,291.1	2,334.0
Conservative	Thomas Heald	17.3	1,043	1,048.0	1,071.0	1,153.0	1,153.3	1,175.6	
Labour	Gerry McGarvey	14.0	846	857.0	996.0	1,137.0	1,140.4	1,438.0	1,481.1
SNP	Paul Goodwin	11.1	671	672.0	687.0	719.0	776.4		
Independent	Rob Davies‡ (incumbent)	7.8	468	489.0	548.0				
Liberal Democrats	James MacLaren	5.7	345	355.0					
Scottish Family	Liam McKechnie	1.1	69						
Electorate: 10,854 Valid: 6,023 Spoilt: 72 Quota: 1,506 Turnout: 56.2%

=== Dunblane and Bridge of Allan ===
- 2017: 2xCon; 1xSNP; 1xGreen
- 2022: 1xCon; 1xSNP; 1xGreen; 1xLab
- 2017-2022 Change: 1 Lab gain from Con

Dunblane and Bridge of Allan - 4 seats
Party	Candidate	FPv%	Count									
Party	Candidate	FPv%	1	2	3	4	5	6	7	8	9	10
Conservative	Douglas Dodds (incumbent)	21.6	1,536									
SNP	Graham Houston (incumbent)	17.8	1,266	1,268.0	1,269.0	1,293.0	1,317.3	1,815.3				
Green	Alasdair Tollemache (incumbent)	16.0	1,138	1,141.0	1,147.0	1,156.0	1,207.5	1,260.5	1,466.4			
Labour	Ewan Dillon	11.9	842	846.9	850.9	856.9	901.1	910.1	957.4	971.2	1,330.5	1,577.0
Liberal Democrats	Fayzan Rehman	9.4	665	669.2	674.2	674.2	748.3	760.3	785.6	799.6		
Conservative	Willy Stirling	8.4	598	686.2	701.4	705.4	819.0	819.0	823.3	824.9	956.0	
SNP	Ahsan Khan	7.9	564	564.2	564.2	569.2	581.2					
Independent	Alastair George Majury (incumbent)	5.3	377	382.2	387.2	396.2						
Alba	Bill Cowan	0.9	61	61.1	64.1							
Scottish Family	Nickie Willis	0.7	50	50.3								
Electorate: 11,911 Valid: 7,097 Spoilt: 102 Quota: 1,420 Turnout: 60.4%

=== Stirling North ===
- 2017: 2xSNP; 1xCon; 1xLab
- 2022: 2xSNP; 1xCon; 1xLab
- 2012-2017: No change

Stirling North - 4 seats
Party	Candidate	FPv%	Count						
Party	Candidate	FPv%	1	2	3	4	5	6	7
SNP	Susan McGill (incumbent)	25.7	1,305						
Conservative	Rachel Nunn	22.8	1,161						
Labour	Danny Gibson (incumbent)	20.2	1,029						
SNP	Jim Thomson (incumbent)	12.6	642	872.7	878.2	879.6	886.3	908.4	1,474.8
Green	Amy Smith	13.7	695	727.3	735.6	737.9	751.7	852.1	
Liberal Democrats	Oliver Franklin	3.7	190	195.3	254.1	257.6	276.2		
Scottish Family	Shena McLelland	1.3	64	64.9	77.7	78.3			
Electorate: 11,589 Valid: 5,117 Spoilt: 91 Quota: 1,018 Turnout: 44.7%

=== Stirling West ===
- 2012: 1xLab; 1xSNP; 1xCon
- 2017: 1xCon; 1xSNP; 1xLab
- 2012-2017 Change: No change

Stirling West - 3 seats
Party	Candidate	FPv%	Count						
Party	Candidate	FPv%	1	2	3	4	5	6	7
Conservative	Neil Benny (incumbent)	23.8	1,313	1,334.0	1,364.0	2,041.0			
SNP	Scott Farmer (incumbent)	21.9	1,207	1,214.0	1,239.0	1,240.0	1,258.9	1,279.9	2,038.4
Labour	Jen Preston	20.0	1,100	1,118.0	1,268.0	1,302.0	1,509.2		
SNP	Morag Fulton	13.8	760	768.0	792.0	801.0	809.1	834.0	
Conservative	Alastair Pettigrew	13.3	730	742.0	762.0				
Liberal Democrats	Dick Moerman	5.2	285	296.0					
Scottish Family	Michael Willis	2.0	110						
Electorate: 10,192 Valid: 5,505 Spoilt: 95 Quota: 1,377 Turnout: 54.9%

=== Stirling East ===
- 2017: 1xCon; 1xLab; 1xSNP
- 2022: 1xCon; 1xLab; 1xSNP
- 2017-2022: No change

Stirling East - 3 seats
Party	Candidate	FPv%	Count					
Party	Candidate	FPv%	1	2	3	4	5	6
SNP	Gerry McLaughlan	30.7	1,177					
Conservative	Bryan Flannagan (incumbent)	23.3	893	895.0	905.0	925.0	931.2	999.2
Labour	Chris Kane (incumbent)	21.6	829	839.4	848.4	877.7	933.9	1,019.6
SNP	Grant Thoms	8.0	306	488.4	497.4	502.2	578.7	650.0
Independent	Gary McGrow	7.9	303	305.8	310.8	323.0	359.7	
Green	Linda Hendry	4.7	182	189.8	194.1	213.9		
Liberal Democrats	Gordon Murphy	2.4	91	93.2	98.2			
Scottish Family	David Tortolano	1.4	53	53.6				
Electorate: 8,587 Valid: 3,834 Spoilt: 71 Quota: 959 Turnout: 45.5%

=== Bannockburn ===
- 2017: 2xSNP; 1xLab
- 2022: 1xSNP; 1xLab; 1xInd
- 2017-2022 Change: 1 Ind gain from SNP

Bannockburn - 3 seats
Party	Candidate	FPv%	Count							
Party	Candidate	FPv%	1	2	3	4	5	6	7	8
Independent	Alasdair MacPherson (incumbent)	26.0	955							
Labour	Margaret Brisley (incumbent)	20.7	762	770.1	775.3	794.8	813.3	839.8	900.8	1,188.2
SNP	Brian Hambly	20.4	749	755.2	756.3	764.6	786.9	1,085.1		
Conservative	Stuart McLuckie	19.1	702	705.1	717.2	731.5	737.6	739.6	743.9	
SNP	Diane Tortolano	8.3	306	310.1	313.1	320.2	345.8			
Green	Marie Stadtler	2.4	87	88.8	93.0	101.1				
Liberal Democrats	Hilary MacPherson	2.1	77	78.5	81.6					
Scottish Family	Sophie Hendry	1.1	41	41.9						
Electorate: 8,777 Valid: 3,679 Spoilt: 64 Quota: 920 Turnout: 42.6%

=== Notes ===
- ‡On 17 May 2017, Robert Davies (Forth and Endrick) was suspended from the Scottish Conservative party over potentially offensive Twitter posts. He was reinstated on 21 August 2017. However, on 29 September 2017, Robert Davies resigned from the Conservative group at a council meeting and subsequently had his Conservative party membership terminated. He ran as an independent in the 2022 election.

== Aftermath ==
Despite the SNP winning the most seats, Labour formed a minority administration after the Conservatives voted in favour of it.

In October 2022, Labour councillor Ewan Dillon quit the party to become an independent. This reduced the ruling Labour administration to five councillors.

=== 2023 Dunblane and Bridge of Allan by-election ===
In December 2022, SNP councillor Graham Houston died. A by-election was held on 16 March 2023 and was won by Conservative candidate Robin Kleinman.

Dunblane and Bridge of Allan by-election (16 March 2023) – 1 seat
Party	Candidate	FPv%	Count					
Party	Candidate	FPv%	1	2	3	4	5	6
Conservative	Robin Kleinman	41.0	1,832	1,849	1,861	1,959	2,172	2,473
SNP	Ahsan Khan	26.9	1,202	1,205	1,416	1,491	1,683	
Labour	David Wilson	13.4	600	609	670	871		
Liberal Democrats	Dick Moerman	8.9	399	404	475			
Green	Clare Andrews	8.7	389	390				
Scottish Family	Nickie Willis	1.1	50					
Electorate: 11,792 Valid: 4,074 Spoilt: 26 Quota: 2,237 Turnout: 38.1%

=== January 2024 Dunblane and Bridge of Allan by-election ===
On 8 November 2023, Conservative councillor Douglas Dodds resigned his seat, citing "personal and health reasons." A by-election was on 25 January 2024 and was won by Conservative candidate Thomas Heald.

Dunblane and Bridge of Allan by-election (25 January 2024) – 1 seat
Party	Candidate	FPv%	Count					
Party	Candidate	FPv%	1	2	3	4	5	6
Conservative	Thomas Heald	37.8	1,644	1,653	1,714	1,738	1,998	2,286
SNP	Ahsan Khan	23.3	1,000	1,006	1,037	1,266	1,531	
Labour	David Wilson	20.2	869	874	989	1,147		
Green	Clare Andrews	10.1	433	442	485			
Liberal Democrats	Dick Moerman	6.8	292	296				
Scottish Family	Michael Willis	1.2	50					
Electorate: 11,778 Valid: 4,288 Spoilt: 27 Quota: 2,145 Turnout: 36.6%

=== August 2024 Dunblane and Bridge of Allan by-election ===
In May 2024, independent councillor Ewan Dillon resigned after pleading guilty to the possession of indecent images. A by-election was held on 15 August 2024 to elect his replacement, and was won by Labour candidate David Wilson.

Dunblane and Bridge of Allan by-election (15 August 2024) – 1 seat
Party	Candidate	FPv%	Count					
Party	Candidate	FPv%	1	2	3	4	5	6
Conservative	Stuart McLuckie	27.9	1,143	1,214	1,284	1,328	1,361	
Labour	David Wilson	23.3	952	981	1,101	1,390	1,826	2,252
SNP	John Watson	18.8	770	793	826	1,076		
Green	Andrew Adam	16.1	659	670	760			
Liberal Democrats	Dick Moerman	8.4	345	382				
Independent	Alastair Majury	5.5	225					
Electorate: 12,057 Valid: 4,094 Spoilt: 21 Quota: 2,048 Turnout: 34.1%

=== Bannockburn by-election ===
In October 2024, Labour councillor Marget Brisley died. A by-election was held on 23 January 2025 to elect her replacement, and was won by SNP candidate Bob Buchanan.

Bannockburn by-election (23 January 2025) - 1 seat
Party	Candidate	FPv%	Count					
Party	Candidate	FPv%	1	2	3	4	5	6
SNP	Bob Buchanan	35.9	565	590	597	605	664	863
Labour	Yvonne Dickson	23.9	376	384	401	448	528	
Reform	William Docherty	22.7	358	360	367	425		
Conservative	Moira Benny	10.7	169	171	186			
Liberal Democrats	William Galloway	3.5	55	65				
Green	Marie Stadtler	3.4	53					
Electorate: 9,097 Valid: 1,576 Spoilt: 22 Quota: 789 Turnout: 17.6%

=== Stirling East by-election ===
In August 2025, Conservative councillor Bryan Flannagan resigned. A by-election was held on 30 October 2025 and was won by SNP candidate Josh Fyvie.

Stirling East by-election (30 October 2025) - 1 seat
Party	Candidate	FPv%	Count					
Party	Candidate	FPv%	1	2	3	4	5	6
SNP	Josh Fyvie	36.4	808	813	827	905	988	1,245
Labour	Yvonne Dickson	23.9	530	540	577	622	710	
Reform	William Docherty	23.3	517	523	572	578		
Conservative	James Corbett	6.6	147	156				
Green	Marie Stadtler	6.3	141	158	167			
Liberal Democrats	William Galloway	3.6	79					
Electorate: 8,662 Valid: 2,222 Spoilt: 28 Quota: 1,112 Turnout: 26.0%

=== Summary of changes 2022–2027 ===
Date	SNP	Con	Lab	Green	Ind	Vacant	Reason	Leader
5 May 2022	8	7	6	1	1		2022 Stirling Council election	Chris Kane (Lab)
19 October 2022	8	7	5	1	2		Ewan Dillon (Lab) becomes Independent	Chris Kane (Lab)
18 December 2022	7	7	5	1	2	1	Death of Graham Houston (SNP)	Chris Kane (Lab)
16 March 2023	7	8	5	1	2		Robin Kleinman (Con) elected in by-election	Chris Kane (Lab)
10 November 2023	7	7	5	1	2	1	Resignation of Douglas Dodds (Con)	Chris Kane (Lab)
25 January 2024	7	8	5	1	2		Thomas Heald (Con) elected in by-election	Chris Kane (Lab)
20 May 2024	7	8	5	1	1	1	Resignation of Ewan Dillon (Ind)	Chris Kane (Lab)
15 August 2024	7	8	6	1	1		David Wilson (Lab) elected in by-election	Chris Kane (Lab)
12 September 2024	7	8	5	1	1	1	Resignation of Chris Kane (Lab)	Margaret Brisley (Lab)
27 October 2024	7	8	4	1	1	2	Death of Margaret Brisley (Lab)	Vacant
5 December 2024	8	8	4	1	1	1	Willie Ferguson (SNP) elected in by-election	Vacant
23 January 2025	9	8	4	1	1		Bob Buchanan (SNP) elected in by-election	Vacant
4 August 2025	9	7	4	1	1	1	Resignation of Bryan Flannagan (Con)	Vacant
30 October 2025	10	7	4	1	1		Josh Fyvie (SNP) elected in by-election	Susan McGill (SNP)
