= 1999 Stirling Council election =

1999 Scottish local government election

The 1999 Stirling Council election was held on 6 May 1999, the same day as the other Scottish local government elections and the Scottish Parliament general election.

== Results ==
1999 Stirling Council election result
Party	Seats	Gains	Losses	Net gain/loss	Seats %	Votes %	Votes	+/−
Labour	11			▼2	50.0	38.0		▼11.2
Conservative	9			▲2	40.9	27.2		▲1.8
SNP	2			Steady	9.1	24.8		▲5.9
Liberal Democrats	0			Steady	0.0	9.0		▲4.4
Independent	0			Steady	0.0	1.1		▼0.3
