= 1995 Stirling Council election =

1995 Scottish local government election

The 1995 Stirling Council election was held on 6 April 1995, the same day as the other Scottish local government elections.

== Results ==
1995 Stirling Council election result
Party	Seats	Gains	Losses	Net gain/loss	Seats %	Votes %	Votes	+/−
Labour	13	-	-	▲3	59.1	49.1	16,983	▲14.9
Conservative	7	-	-	▼3	31.8	25.4	8,777	▼17.6
SNP	2	-	-	▲2	9.1	18.9	6,544	▲2.3
Liberal Democrats	0	-	-	Steady	0.0	4.6	1,591	▲1.0
Independent	0	-	-	Steady	0.0	1.4	487	▼0.3
Scottish Green	0	-	-	Steady	0.0	0.5	184	▼0.7
