= Forth and Endrick (ward) =

Electoral ward of Stirling, Scotland

Location of the ward

Forth and Endrick is one of the seven wards used to elect members of the Stirling Council. It elects three Councillors.

== Councillors ==
| Election | Councillors | | |
|---|---|---|---|
| 2007 | Graham Lambie (SNP) | Colin O'Brien (Labour) | Alistair Berrill (Conservative) |
| 2012 | Graham Lambie (SNP) | Ian Muirhead (SNP) | Alistair Berrill (Conservative) |
| 2017 | Graham Lambie (SNP) | Robert Davies (Conservative) | Alistair Berrill (Conservative) |
| 2022 | Rosemary Fraser (SNP) | Gerry McGarvey (Labour) | Paul Henke (Conservative) |

== Election results ==
=== 2022 Election ===
2022 Stirling Council election

Forth and Endrick - 3 seats
| Party | Candidate | FPv% | Count | | | | | | |
| Party | Candidate | FPv% | 1 | 2 | 3 | 4 | 5 | 6 | 7 |
|---|---|---|---|---|---|---|---|---|---|
| SNP | Rosemary Fraser | 24.1 | 1,451 | 1,454.0 | 1,484.0 | 1,570.0 | | | |
| Conservative | Paul Henke | 18.8 | 1,130 | 1,140.0 | 1,180.0 | 1,272.0 | 1,272.4 | 1,291.1 | 2,334.0 |
| Conservative | Thomas Heald | 17.3 | 1,043 | 1,048.0 | 1,071.0 | 1,153.0 | 1,153.3 | 1,175.6 | |
| Labour | Gerry McGarvey | 14.0 | 846 | 857.0 | 996.0 | 1,137.0 | 1,140.4 | 1,438.0 | 1,481.1 |
| SNP | Paul Goodwin | 11.1 | 671 | 672.0 | 687.0 | 719.0 | 776.4 | | |
| Independent | Rob Davies‡ (incumbent) | 7.8 | 468 | 489.0 | 548.0 | | | | |
| Liberal Democrats | James MacLaren | 5.7 | 345 | 355.0 | | | | | |
| Scottish Family | Liam McKechnie | 1.1 | 69 | | | | | | |
Electorate: 10,854 Valid: 6,023 Spoilt: 72 Quota: 1,506 Turnout: 56.2%

=== 2017 Election ===
2017 Stirling Council election

Forth and Endrick - 3 seats
| Party | Candidate | FPv% | Count | | | | | | |
| Party | Candidate | FPv% | 1 | 2 | 3 | 4 | 5 | 6 | 7 |
|---|---|---|---|---|---|---|---|---|---|
| Conservative | Alistair Berrill (incumbent) | 26.6 | 1,651 | | | | | | |
| Conservative | Robert Davies ‡ | 18.5 | 1,147 | 1,234.4 | 1,255.6 | 1,355.4 | 1,597.0 | | |
| SNP | Graham Lambie (incumbent) | 16.5 | 1,026 | 1,027.4 | 1,117.4 | 1,165.5 | 1,256.6 | 1,259.7 | 2,276.2 |
| SNP | Ian Muirhead (incumbent) | 13.8 | 859 | 859.9 | 942.0 | 1,031 | 1,243.3 | 1,246.4 | |
| Independent | Evan McLean | 10.1 | 630 | 632.5 | 702.7 | 899.0 | | | |
| Labour | Richard Simpson | 8.5 | 529 | 530.4 | 602.5 | | | | |
| Green | Michael Marten | 6.0 | 371 | 371.6 | | | | | |
Electorate: 10,405 Valid: 6,213 Spoilt: 115 Quota: 1,554 Turnout: 60.8%

=== 2012 Election ===
2012 Stirling Council election

Forth and Endrick - 3 seats
| Party | Candidate | FPv% | Count | | | | | | |
| Party | Candidate | FPv% | 1 | 2 | 3 | 4 | 5 | 6 | 7 |
|---|---|---|---|---|---|---|---|---|---|
| Conservative | Alistair Berrill (incumbent) | 23.58% | 1,097 | 1,128 | 1,198 | | | | |
| SNP | Graham Lambie (incumbent) | 19.60% | 912 | 927 | 944 | 945.2 | 1,016.3 | 1,041.4 | 1,171.4 |
| SNP | Ian Muirhead | 18.49% | 860 | 894 | 928 | 929.3 | 991.4 | 1,020.4 | 1,201.7 |
| Labour | Alistair William Weir | 16.14% | 751 | 788 | 824 | 824.9 | 917.0 | 982.4 | |
| Conservative | Philip Graves | 6.64% | 309 | 328 | 356 | 383.2 | 408.7 | | |
| UKIP | Paul Henke | 5.61% | 261 | 271 | | | | | |
| Green | Gordon Kerr Cowtan | 5.55% | 258 | 298 | 335 | 336.2 | | | |
| Liberal Democrats | Alison McGilvray | 4.39% | 204 | | | | | | |
Electorate: 8,464 Valid: 4,652 Spoilt: 56 Quota: 1,164 Turnout: 4,708 (48.79%)

=== 2007 Election ===
2007 Stirling Council election

Stirling council election, 2007: Dunblane and Bridge of Allan
| Party | Candidate | FPv% | % | Seat | Count |
|---|---|---|---|---|---|
| SNP | Graham Houston | 1,794 | 22.8 | 1 | 1 |
| Conservative | Callum Campbell | 1,455 | 18.5 | 2 | 4 |
| Labour | Colin Finlay | 1,294 | 16.5 | 4 | 6 |
| Liberal Democrats | David Goss | 1,067 | 13.6 | 3 | 6 |
| Conservative | Helen McCrea | 801 | 10.2 | | |
| Independent | Bill Baird | 707 | 9.0 | | |
| Green | Duncan Illingworth | 675 | 8.6 | | |
| Scottish Socialist | Jennifer Haston | 69 | 0.9 | | |
