= 2017 Stirling Council election =

2017 Scottish local government election

- 4 May 2017

All 23 seats to Stirling Council 12 seats needed for a majority
	First party	Second party
Leader	Neil Benny	Scott Farmer
Party	Conservative	SNP
Leader's seat	Stirling West	Stirling West
Last election	4 seats, 19.9%	9 seats, 37.2%
Seats before	4	9
Seats won	9	9
Seat change	▲5	Steady
Popular vote	13,261	12,408
Percentage	37.2%	34.7%
Swing	▲17.2%	▼2.7%
	Third party	Fourth party
Leader	Danny Gibson	Alasdair Tollemache
Party	Labour	Green
Leader's seat	Stirling North	Dunblane and Bridge of Allan
Last election	8 seats, 28.6%	1 seat, 5.8%
Seats before	8	1
Seats won	4	1
Seat change	▼4	Steady
Popular vote	5,772	2,339
Percentage	16.2%	6.6%
Swing	▼12.6%	▲0.7%
- The 7 multi-member wards
Council Leader before election
Johanna Boyd
Labour
Council Leader after election
Scott Farmer
SNP

The 2017 Stirling Council election was held on 4 May 2017, the same day as the 31 other local authorities in Scotland. The election used the seven wards created under the Local Governance (Scotland) Act 2004, with 23 councillors being elected, an increase of 1 from 2012. Each ward elected either 3 or 4 members, using the STV electoral system. Following the Fifth Electoral Review by the Local Government Boundary Commission for Scotland, minor changes were made to several of the ward boundaries and one additional Councillor was added, increasing the total number of Councillors from twenty-two to twenty-three.

The election saw the Scottish Conservative and Unionist Party increased their representation on the council by five and significantly increase their vote share. The SNP retained their nine seats (though lost the council seat they had won in a 2015 by-election) and the Scottish Green Party retained their one seat. The Scottish Labour Party saw their representation on the Council drop by four seats and the Scottish Liberal Democrats and all independent candidates failed to win any seats.

Following the 2012 election a coalition had been formed between the Labour Party and the Conservatives which replaced the previous SNP minority administration. In the aftermath of the 2017 election a new coalition was agreed between the SNP and Labour with Labour Councillor Christine Simpson becoming Provost of Stirling and the SNP's Graham Houston becoming depute convener of the council.

== Results ==
2017 Stirling Council election result
Party	Seats	Gains	Losses	Net gain/loss	Seats %	Votes %	Votes	+/−
Conservative	9	5	0	▲5	40.9	37.2	13,261	▲17.2
SNP	9	2	2	Steady	40.9	34.7	12,408	▼2.7
Labour	4	0	4	▼4	13.6	16.2	5,772	▼12.6
Green	1	0	0	Steady	4.5	6.6	2,339	▲0.7
Liberal Democrats	0	0	0	Steady	0.0	3.3	1,180	▼2.2
Independent	0	0	0	Steady	0.0	2.0	715	▲0.4

Note: "Votes" are the first preference votes. The net gain/loss and percentage changes relate to the result of the previous Scottish local elections on 3 May 2012. This may differ from other published sources showing gain/loss relative to seats held at dissolution of Scotland's councils.

== Ward results ==
=== Trossachs and Teith ===
- 2012: 2xSNP; 1xCon
- 2017: 2xCon; 1xSNP
- 2012-2017 Change: 1 Con gain from SNP

Trossachs and Teith - 3 seats
Party	Candidate	FPv%	Count					
Party	Candidate	FPv%	1	2	3	4	5	6
Conservative	Martin Earl (incumbent)	38.1	2,027					
SNP	Evelyn Tweed	20.5	1,090	1,105.8	1,112.5	1,227.6	1,306.6	1,311.7
SNP	Fergus Wood (incumbent)	14.6	776	799.4	809.1	850.8	890.2	891.7
Conservative	Jeremy McDonald	11.9	632	1,210.5	1,250.7	1,286.6	1,378.5	
Labour	Gerry McGarvey	6.1	326	342.2	391.3	478.6		
Green	Gordon Cowtan	5.4	286	296.3	347.7			
Liberal Democrats	Galen Milne	3.3	177	191.5				
Electorate: 9,147 Valid: 5,314 Spoilt: 118 Quota: 1,329 Turnout: 59.4%

=== Forth and Endrick ===
- 2012: 2xSNP; 1xCon
- 2017: 2xCon; 1xSNP
- 2012-2017 Change: 1 Con gain from SNP

Forth and Endrick - 3 seats
Party	Candidate	FPv%	Count					
Party	Candidate	FPv%	1	2	3	4	5	6
Conservative	Alistair Berrill (incumbent)	26.6	1,651					
Conservative	Robert Davies ‡	18.5	1,147	1,234.4	1,255.6	1,355.4	1,597.0	
SNP	Graham Lambie (incumbent)‡‡‡	16.5	1,026	1,027.4	1,117.4	1,165.5	1,256.6	1,259.7
SNP	Ian Muirhead (incumbent)	13.8	859	859.9	942.0	1,031	1,243.3	1,246.4
Independent	Evan McLean	10.1	630	632.5	702.7	899.0		
Labour	Richard Simpson	8.5	529	530.4	602.5			
Green	Michael Marten	6.0	371	371.6				
Electorate: 10,405 Valid: 6,213 Spoilt: 115 Quota: 1,554 Turnout: 60.8%

=== Dunblane and Bridge of Allan ===
- 2012: 1xSNP; 1xCon; 1xLab; 1xGreen
- 2017: 2xCon; 1xSNP; 1xGreen
- 2012-2017 Change: 1 Con gain from Lab

Dunblane and Bridge of Allan - 4 seats
Party	Candidate	FPv%	Count					
Party	Candidate	FPv%	1	2	3	4	5	6
Conservative	Alastair Majury	22.1	1,543					
Conservative	Douglas Dodds	21.5	1,502					
SNP	Graham Houston (incumbent)	17.2	1,203	1,205.4	1,208.3	1,250.0	1,885.6	
Green	Alasdair Tollemache	10.1	706	717.2	727.1	883.5	950.6	1,218.4
Labour	Mike Robbins (incumbent)	11.8	824	849.8	866.3	1,053.3	1,076.4	1,143.4
SNP	Rosemary Hunter	10.4	723	724.4	724.6	741.8		
Liberal Democrats	Stuart Auld	6.8	476	512.0	536.0			
Electorate: 11,484 Valid: 6,977 Spoilt: 123 Quota: 1,396 Turnout: 61.8%

=== Stirling North ===
- 2017: 2xSNP; 1xCon; 1xLab
- 2012-2017 Change: New ward

Stirling North - 4 seats
Party	Candidate	FPv%	Count						
Party	Candidate	FPv%	1	2	3	4	5	6	7
Conservative	Ross Oxburgh	26.7	1,237						
SNP	Susan McGill	22.8	1,054						
Labour	Danny Gibson (incumbent)	13.3	616	665.1	668.7	682.2	729.8	994.1	
SNP	Jim Thomson (incumbent)	15.7	727	740.3	845.6	862.2	885.2	899.7	906.4
Green	Chloe Campbell	10.7	496	511.0	519.1	543.9	614.0	637.2	655.3
Labour	Jen Preston	5.7	266	302.8	305.9	312.9	349.6		
Liberal Democrats	Fayzan Rehman	3.2	150	205.6	206.1	222.4			
Independent	James McDonald	1.8	85	117.3	118.3				
Electorate: 10,512 Valid: 4,631 Spoilt: 124 Quota: 927 Turnout: 45.2%

=== Stirling West ===
- 2012: 1xLab; 1xSNP; 1xCon
- 2017: 1xCon; 1xSNP; 1xLab
- 2012-2017 Change: No change

Stirling West - 3 seats
Party	Candidate	FPv%	Count				
Party	Candidate	FPv%	1	2	3	4	5
Conservative	Neil Benny (incumbent)	39.5	2,076				
Labour	Christine Simpson (incumbent)	17.8	936	1,151.4	1,210.8	1,456.0	
SNP	Scott Farmer (incumbent)	20.9	1,096	1,116.6	1,156.6	1,193.2	1,213.1
SNP	Morag Fulton	12.8	671	676.5	755.2	786.5	805.3
Liberal Democrats	Robert Skilleter	4.2	221	411.4	480.9		
Green	Kevin Ralston	4.8	251	287.0			
Electorate: 9,637 Valid: 5,251 Spoilt: 74 Quota: 1,313 Turnout: 55.3%

=== Stirling East ===
- 2012: 2xLab; 1xSNP
- 2017: 1xCon; 1xLab; 1xSNP
- 2012-2017: Change: 1 Con gain from Lab

Stirling East - 3 seats
Party	Candidate	FPv%	Count					
Party	Candidate	FPv%	1	2	3	4	5	6
SNP	Alison Laurie	24.2	916	920	962			
Labour	Chris Kane	19.8	751	768	797	797.7	1,153.8	
Conservative	Bryan Flanagan	21.3	806	825	833	833.2	848.2	883.0
SNP	Gerry McLaughlan (incumbent)	17.9	678	680	705	717.9	739.0	774.8
Labour	Corrie McChord (incumbent)	11.0	416	427	440	440.3		
Green	Linda Hendry	3.3	125	150				
Liberal Democrats	William Galloway	2.5	94					
Electorate: 8,479 Valid: 3,786 Spoilt: 93 Quota: 947 Turnout: 45.7%

=== Bannockburn ===
- 2012: 2xLab; 1xSNP
- 2017: 2xSNP; 1xLab
- 2012-2017 Change: 1 SNP gain from Lab

Bannockburn - 3 seats
Party	Candidate	FPv%	Count					
Party	Candidate	FPv%	1	2	3	4	5	6
SNP	Alasdair MacPherson (incumbent)	24.9	871	880				
Labour	Margaret Brisley (incumbent)	23.9	837	854	854.3	871.3	1,093.3	
SNP	Maureen Bennison‡‡	20.5	718	722	725.2	765.3	779.3	813.1
Conservative	Paul Henke	18.3	640	653	653.1	662.1	683.1	723.4
Labour	Violet Weir (incumbent)	7.7	271	274	274.1	292.2		
Green	Jennifer Tollemache	3.0	104	113	113.1			
Liberal Democrats	Gordon Bruce	1.8	62					
Electorate: 8,672 Valid: 3,503 Spoilt: 124 Quota: 876 Turnout: 41.8%

== Aftermath ==
On 17 May 2017, Forth and Endrick Conservative councillor Robert Davies was suspended from the Scottish Conservative party over potentially offensive Twitter posts. He was reinstated on 21 August 2017. However, on 29 September 2017, Davies resigned from the Conservative group at a council meeting and subsequently had his Conservative party membership terminated. He sat as an independent councillor for the remainder of the term.

On 5 August 2020, it was reported that Bannockburn SNP councillor Bennison had resigned from the Scottish National Party, due to bullying, sexism and party in-fighting, to become an Independent. It was reported in her letter to her former group leader and current council leader, Stirling West councillor Scott Farmer that: “This has been an extremely difficult decision, but it is the only principled course of action left to me in regrettable circumstances.

On 12 February 2021, Forth and Endrick SNP councillor Graham Lambie died suddenly. A by-election was held in due course, where Conservative Jane Hutchison was elected.
