= Edmonstone =

Edmonstone is a surname. Notable people with the surname include:

- Alice Keppel (née Edmonstone; 1868–1947), British aristocrat and hostess
- Archibald Edmonstone (disambiguation), multiple people
- Charles Edmonstone (1764–1821), Scottish politician
- George Frederick Edmonstone (1813–1864), British administrator in India
- James Edmonstone (c. 1720–1793), Scottish army officer and agriculturalist
- John Edmonstone, British taxidermist
- John Edmonstone of that Ilk (died c. 1410), Scottish nobleman
- Malcolm Edmonstone (born 1980), British jazz pianist and pop arranger
- Neil B. Edmonstone (1765–1841), British civil servant
- Robert Edmonstone (1794–1834), Scottish artist
- William Edmonstone (1810–1888), Scottish naval commander, courtier and politician

== See also ==
- Clan Edmonstone
- Edmonstone baronets
