= Archibald Edmonstone =

Archibald Edmonstone may refer to:

- Archibald Edmonstone of Duntreath (died 1502), Scottish landowner and courtier
- Sir Archibald Edmonstone, 1st Baronet (1717–1807), Scottish MP
- Sir Archibald Edmonstone, 3rd Baronet, Scottish traveller and writer, grandson of the above
- Sir Archibald Edmonstone, 5th Baronet, Scottish baronet, nephew of the above (see Edmonstone baronets)
- Sir Archibald Edmonstone, 7th Baronet, Scottish baronet, grandson of the above (see Edmonstone baronets)
