= Glen Finglas =

Valley in Stirling, Scotland

Coordinates: 56.230°N 4.362°W

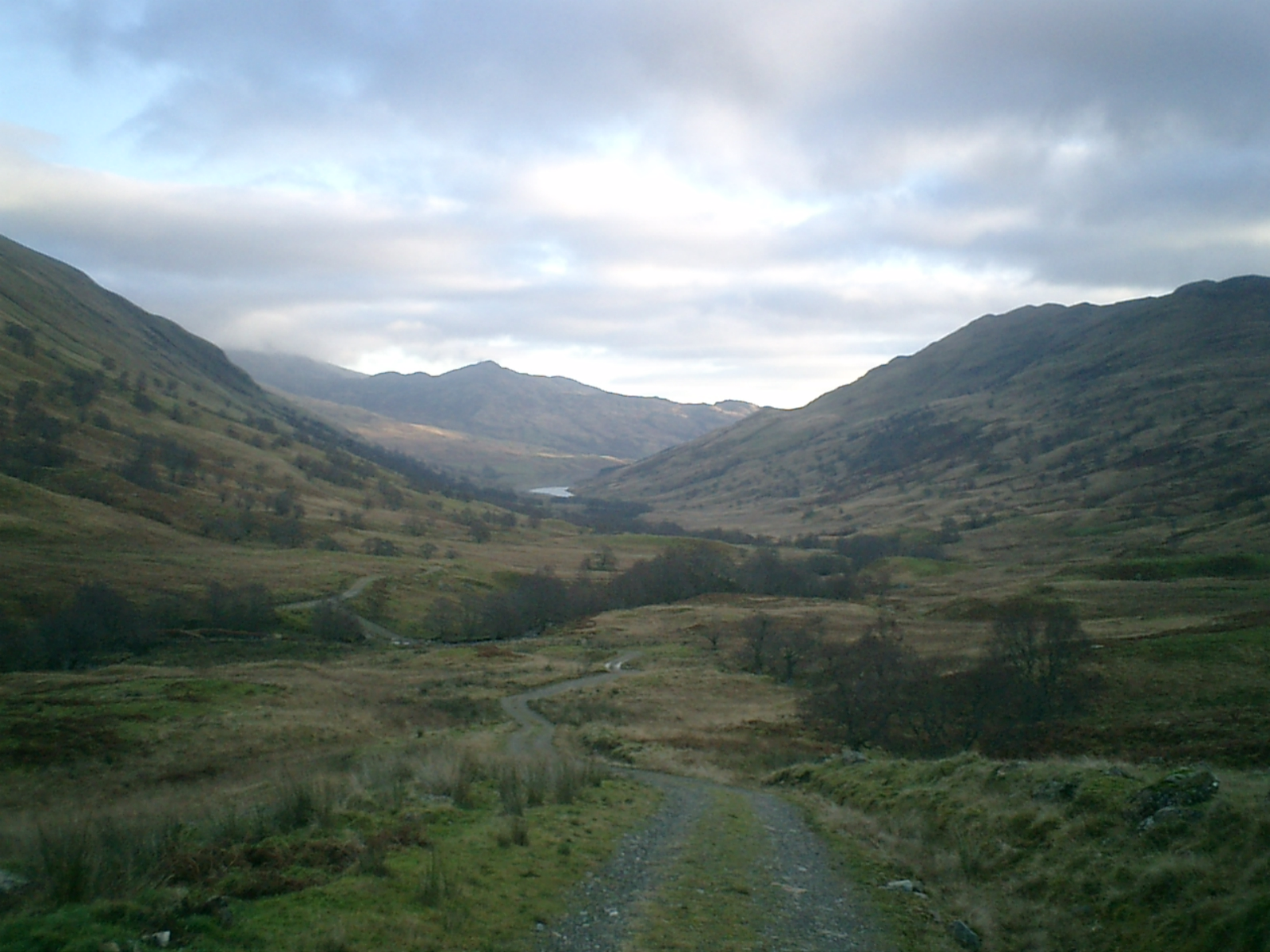
Glen Finglas

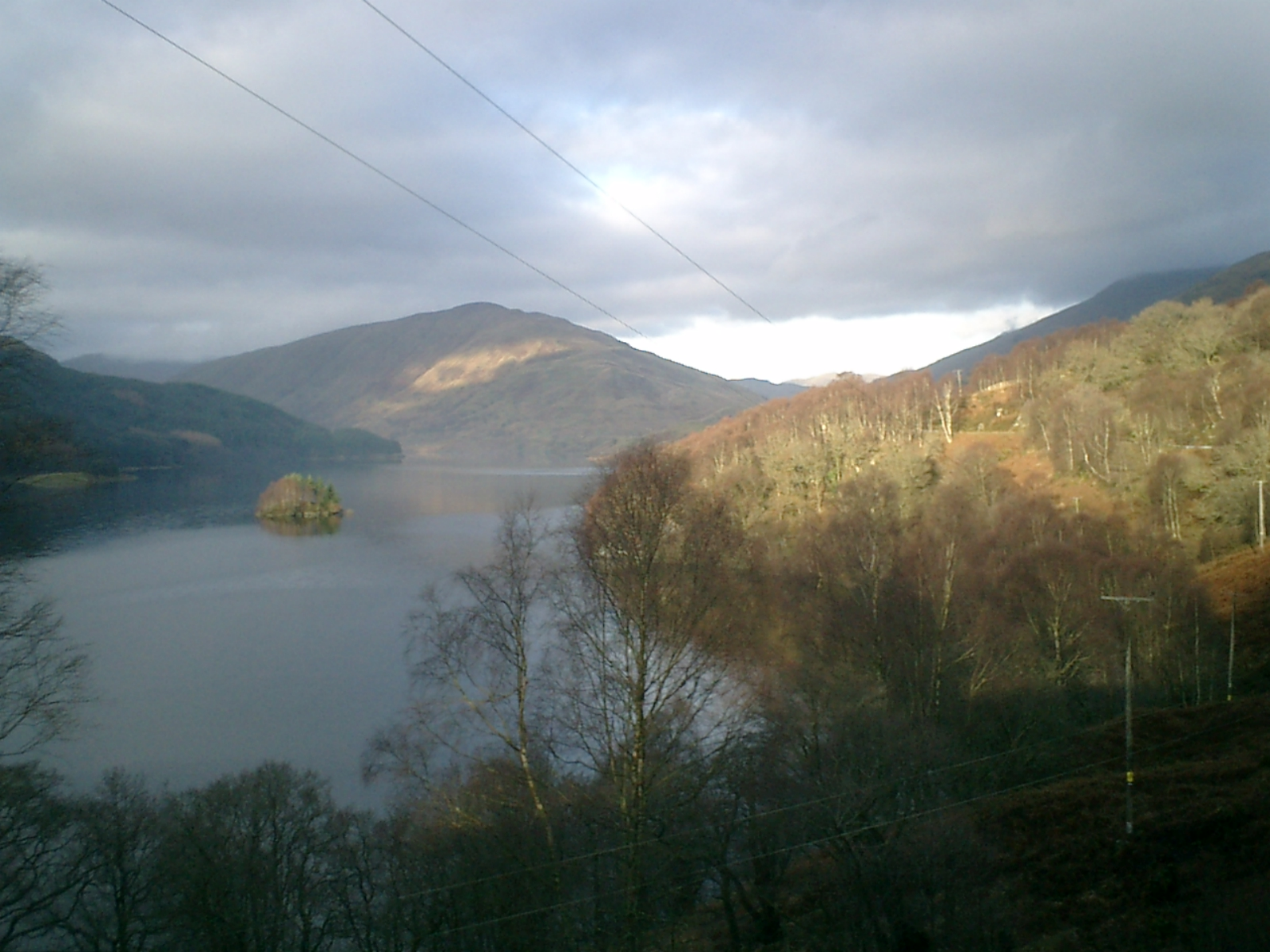
Glen Finglas reservoir

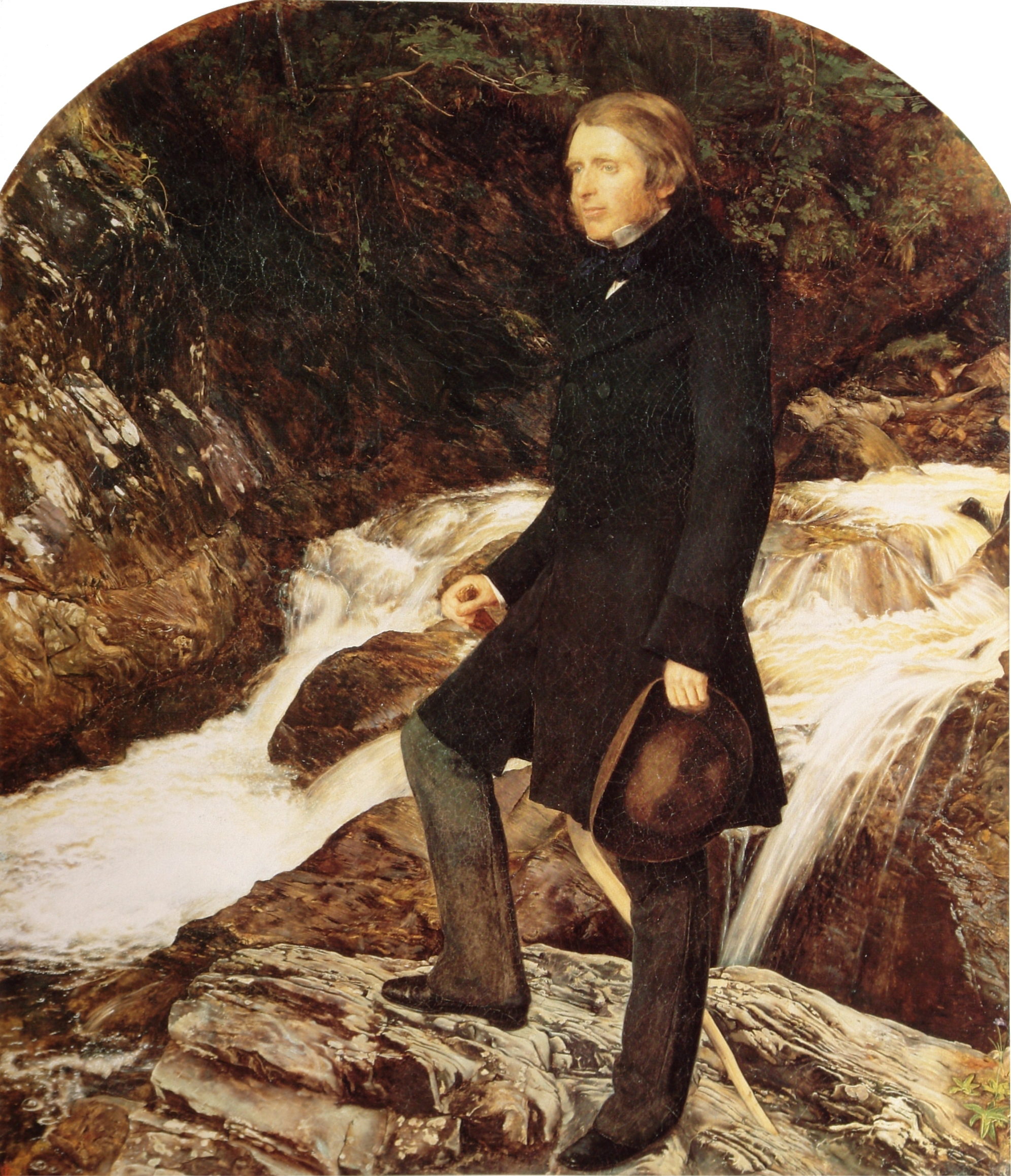
John Ruskin painted in Glenfinlas in 1853 by John Everett Millais and finished in his studio in 1854.

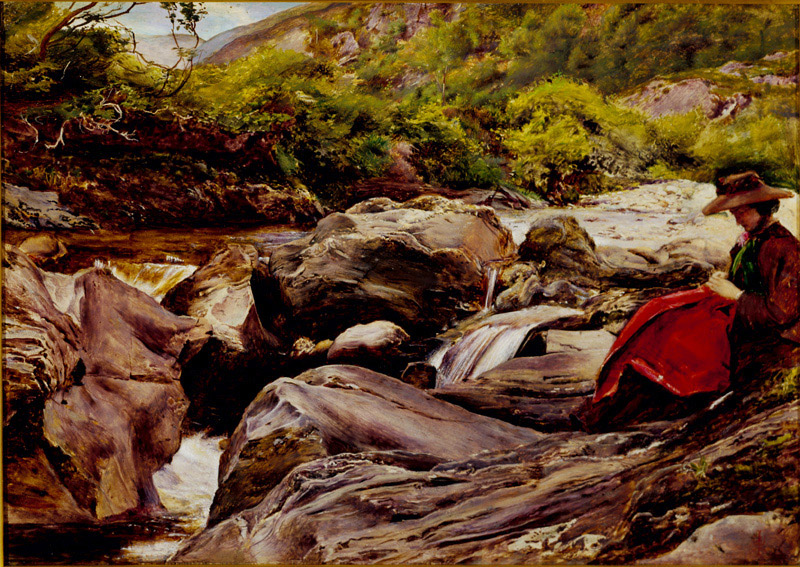
The Waterfall, or Effie at Glenfinlas, 1853, by Millais

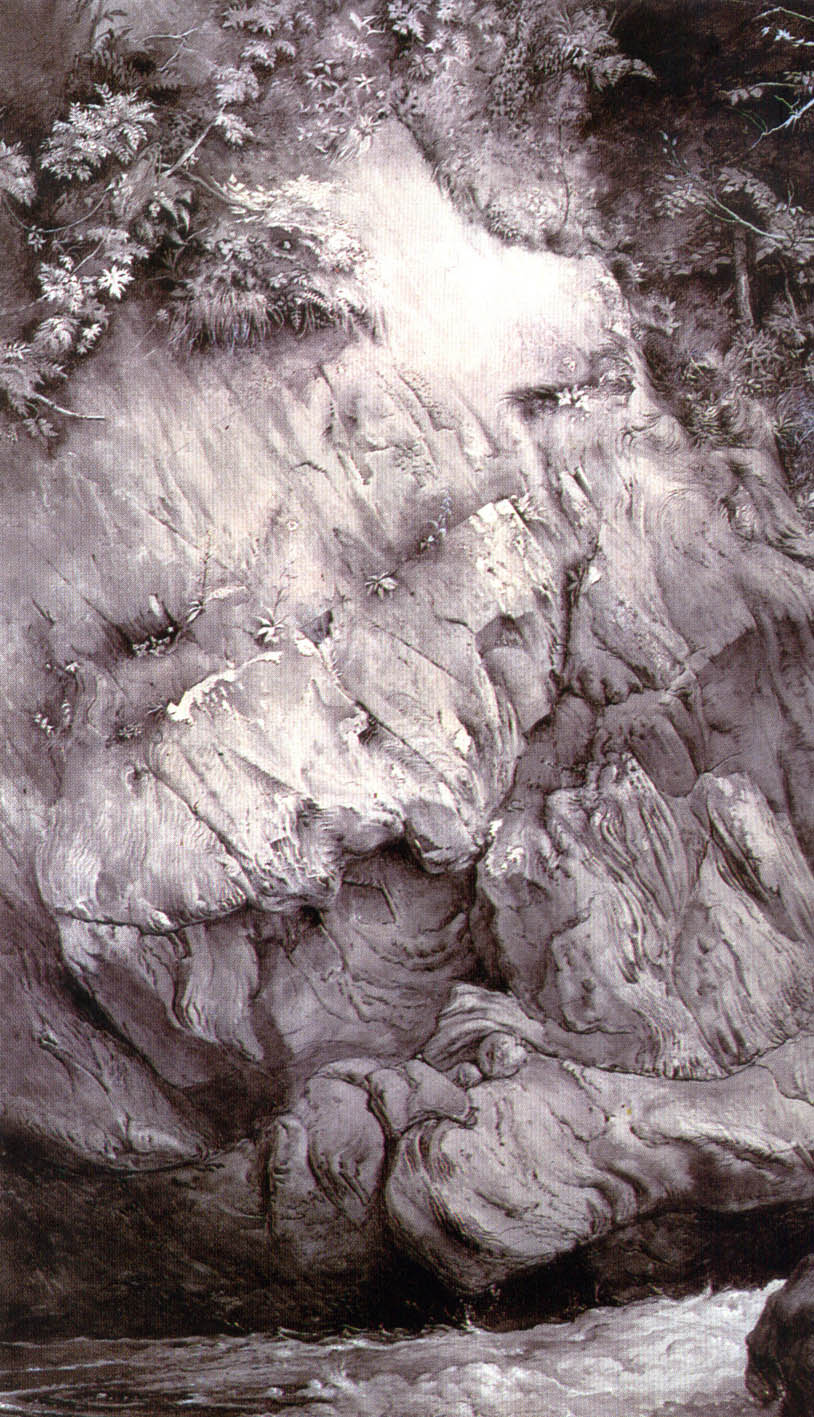
Study of Gneiss Rock, Glenfinlas. Pen and ink study by John Ruskin, 1853, now in the Ashmolean Museum, Oxford.

Glen Finglas (Scottish Gaelic: Gleann Fhionnghlais) is a glen in the Trossachs, in the Stirling council area of Scotland. It is an area of forest in Highlands of the former county of Perthshire, north of Brig o' Turk, close to Callander in Menteith. To the west is Loch Katrine.

== History ==
Part of the Glen was a royal hunting forest. From the 1450s, laws protected the forest area and restricted the rights of tenants on surrounding lands to encourage deer for the hunt.

A flat mound called "Tom Buidhe" (the yellow knoll) near the Glen Finglas Reservoir is thought to be the site of the Hunt Hall, first built for James II of Scotland in the 1400s. James IV came to the Hunt Hall in July 1492. The site was maintained by Archibald Edmondstone of Duntreath, keeper of Doune Castle and the Forests of Menteith and Glenfinglas. In August 1505, James brought tents and pavilions for extra accommodation. He was supplied with dairy goods by two women from Duntreath, and eels and pikes from the Lake of Menteith. In 1508, James IV wrote to the new keeper of Glen Finglas, William Edmonstone, requiring him to visit the parish kirks around the forests, and proclaim that none should stalk deer in the forests with bows or hunting dogs, or make paths. Edmondstone was to identify offenders, confiscating their livestock and dogs (hounds and raches), and send their names to the king for trial and punishment.

Mary of Guise hunted in the Glen with James V soon after her arrival in Scotland in August 1538, riding to the Hunt Hall from Stirling Castle with six ladies in waiting. Mary of Guise returned to Stirling after only a day or two, leaving James to continue his hunting. James V and Mary of Guise returned to the area in September 1539. The pursemaster John Tennent hired men and horses from Dunblane to bring their beds from Stirling, while Malcolm Gourlay brought tents from Edinburgh. Mary, Queen of Scots came to Glen Finglas for three days in September 1563.

The Scottish novelist and poet Sir Walter Scott (1771–1832) wrote the poem "Glenfinlas; or Lord Ronald's Coronach" in 1803.

The Glen Finglas Estate was acquired by the Woodland Trust Scotland in 1996 and is open to the public. The Woodland Trust has restored ancient woodland and created the Great Trossachs Path, one of Scotland's Great Trails, across the estate.

== Ruskin and Millais ==
The leading Victorian art critic John Ruskin (1819–1900) and the Pre-Raphaelite painter John Everett Millais (1829–1896) spent the summer of 1853 together at Glenfinlas. Millais started a painting of John Ruskin in front of a waterfall during the visit, which he finished the following year. The painting is held in the Ashmolean Museum, and has been shown at several exhibitions, including "The Pre-Raphaelites" at Tate Britain in London during 2004. John Ruskin himself was especially interested in the rock formations and, although primarily an art critic, undertook his own studies of these.

== Water supply ==
Glen Finglas supplies water to the city of Glasgow. A dam and reservoir was built by Glasgow Corporation Waterworks, as part of the Loch Katrine water supply project, between 1963 and 1965 to secure the supply of the River Turk and River Finglas. The dam also contains a hydroelectric power station. Water from the reservoir is moved to Loch Katrine by a tunnel; this was completed in 1958 before the reservoir was created, initially diverting water from the River Turk itself.
