= John Kitson =

English cleric and cricketer (1818–1907)

John Francis Kitson (9 March 1818 – 29 July 1907) was an English cleric and cricketer, an alumnus of Exeter College, Oxford.

Born in Crediton, Devon, he was the son of the Rev. John Lane Kitson. He matriculated at Exeter College in 1837, graduating B.A. in 1841. He played one first-class cricket match for Oxford University Cricket Club on 24 May 1838. An opening-batsman of unknown handedness, he scored a pair – two scores of zero – against the Marylebone Cricket Club who were victorious by 47 runs.

Kitson became vicar of Antony, Cornwall. He died in Torpoint, Cornwall. In 1866 he married Charlotte Henrietta Edmonstone, daughter of William Edmonstone. They had eight sons and four daughters.
