= Midlothian (UK Parliament constituency, 1708–1918) =

Parliamentary constituency in the United Kingdom, 1801–1918

Edinburghshire
- Former county constituency for the House of Commons
- Subdivision: Midlothian

1708–1918
- Seats: One
- Created from: Edinburghshire
- Replaced by: Midlothian & Peebles Northern (Majority); Peebles & Southern Midlothian; Edinburgh East; Edinburgh West; Edinburgh South

Edinburghshire (also known as Midlothian) was a Scottish county constituency of the House of Commons of the Parliament of Great Britain (at Westminster) from 1708 to 1801 and of the Parliament of the United Kingdom (also at Westminster) from 1801 to 1918.

It elected one Member of Parliament (MP) by the first past the post system of election.

The seat is most famous as the location of William Ewart Gladstone's upset victory in the Midlothian Campaign of 1880, regarded as the birth of the modern political campaign in the United Kingdom. After Gladstone's victory it became the first non-English constituency to be represented by a serving prime minister.

== Creation ==
The British parliamentary constituency was created in 1708 following the Acts of Union, 1707 and replaced the former Parliament of Scotland shire constituency of Edinburghshire.

== Boundaries ==
As first used, in the 1708 general election of the Parliament of Great Britain, the constituency covered the county of Edinburgh, except the burgh of Edinburgh, which was covered by the Edinburgh burgh constituency. 1708 boundaries were used also for all subsequent elections of that parliament.

In 1801 the Parliament of Ireland was merged with the Parliament of Great Britain to form the Parliament of the United Kingdom. The first general election of the new parliament was the general election of 1802. There was no change to the boundaries of any pre-existing Westminster constituency, and 1802 boundaries were used also in the general elections of 1806, 1807, 1812, 1818, 1820, 1826, 1830 and 1831.

For the 1832 general election, as a result of the Representation of the People Act 1832, the constituency was redefined. The boundaries of counties and burghs for parliamentary purposes ceased to be necessarily those for other purposes, but nominally the Edinburghshire constituency consisted of the county of Edinburgh minus the burghs of Edinburgh, Leith, Portobello, and Musselburgh. Edinburgh was again covered by the Edinburgh constituency, and Leith, Portobello and Musselburgh were covered by the Leith Burghs constituency.

1832 boundaries were used also in the general elections of 1835, 1837, 1841, 1847, 1852, 1857, 1859, 1865, 1874, 1880, 1886, 1892, 1895, 1900, 1906, January 1910 and December 1910.

For the 1918 general election, as a result of the Representation of the People Act 1918, the area of the Edinburghshire constituency was mostly divided between the Midlothian and Peebles Northern and Peebles and Southern Midlothian constituencies. By this date, the county of Edinburgh had been renamed as the county of Midlothian.

The Midlothian and Peebles Northern constituency consisted of the Calder and Suburban districts and part of the Lasswade district of the county of Midlothian, and the Peebles and Southern constituency consisted of the county of Peebles, the Gala Water district and part of the Lasswade district of county of Midlothian, and the burghs of Bonnyrigg, Lasswade, and Penicuik in county of Midlothian.

The rest of the county of Midlothian was covered by the Edinburgh Central, Edinburgh East, Edinburgh North, Edinburgh South, Edinburgh West and Leith constituencies.

== History ==
The constituency elected one Member of Parliament (MP) by the first past the post system. There were 56 voters in 1708, 68 in 1710, about 80 between 1715 and 1754, 84 in 1764, 104 in 1774, 93 in 1788, 95 in 1790 rising to 123 in 1811, 174 in 1820, 168 in 1826 and 165 in 1830. The seat was redefined for the 1832 general election and replaced for the 1918 general election.

== Members of Parliament ==
Election	Member	Party
1708	George Lockhart	Tory
1715	John Baird	
1722	Robert Dundas	
1737	Sir Charles Gilmour	
1751	Robert Balfour-Ramsay	
1754	Robert Dundas	Whig
1761	Sir Alexander Gilmour	
1774	Henry Dundas	Tory
1790	Robert Dundas	Tory
1801	Robert Saunders-Dundas	Tory
1811	Sir George Clerk, Bt	Tory
1832	Sir John Dalrymple, Bt	Whig
1835	Sir George Clerk, Bt	Conservative
1837	William Gibson-Craig	Whig
1841	William Ramsay	Conservative
1845	Sir John Hope, 11th Baronet	Conservative
1853	The Earl of Dalkeith	Conservative
1868	Sir Alexander Ramsay-Gibson-Maitland	Liberal
1874	The Earl of Dalkeith	Conservative
1880	William Ewart Gladstone	Liberal
1895	Sir Thomas Gibson-Carmichael	Liberal
1900	The Master of Elibank	Liberal
1906	Lord Dalmeny	Liberal
1910	The Master of Elibank	Liberal
1912	John Hope	Unionist
1918	constituency abolished	

== Election results ==
=== 1830s ===
General election 1830: Midlothian
Party	Candidate	Votes	%
Tory	George Clerk	Unopposed	
Registered electors		165	
Tory hold			

General election 1831: Midlothian
Party	Candidate	Votes	%
Tory	George Clerk	Unopposed	
Registered electors		165	
Tory hold			

General election 1832: Midlothian
Party	Candidate	Votes	%
Whig	John Dalrymple	601	52.9
Tory	George Clerk	536	47.1
Majority		65	5.8
Turnout		1,137	87.6
Registered electors		1,298	
Whig gain from Tory			

General election 1835: Midlothian
Party	Candidate	Votes	%	±%
Conservative	George Clerk	565	51.4	+4.3
Whig	William Gibson-Craig	534	48.6	−4.3
Majority		31	2.8	N/A
Turnout		1,099	79.9	−7.7
Registered electors		1,376		
Conservative gain from Whig		Swing	+4.3	

General election 1837: Midlothian
Party	Candidate	Votes	%	±%
Whig	William Gibson-Craig	703	51.5	+2.9
Conservative	George Clerk	661	48.5	−2.9
Majority		42	3.0	N/A
Turnout		1,364	81.1	+1.2
Registered electors		1,682		
Whig gain from Conservative		Swing	+2.9	

=== 1840s ===
General election 1841: Midlothian
Party	Candidate	Votes	%	±%
Conservative	William Ramsay	Unopposed		
Registered electors		2,315		
Conservative gain from Whig				

Ramsay resigned by accepting the office of Steward of the Chiltern Hundreds, causing a by-election.

By-election, 25 June 1845: Midlothian
Party	Candidate	Votes	%	±%
Conservative	John Hope	Unopposed		
Conservative hold				

General election 1847: Midlothian
Party	Candidate	Votes	%	±%
Conservative	John Hope	Unopposed		
Registered electors		2,185		
Conservative hold				

=== 1850s ===
General election 1852: Midlothian
Party	Candidate	Votes	%	±%
Conservative	John Hope	Unopposed		
Registered electors		2,017		
Conservative hold				

Hope's death caused a by-election.

By-election, 25 June 1853: Midlothian
Party	Candidate	Votes	%	±%
Conservative	William Montagu Douglas Scott	Unopposed		
Conservative hold				

General election 1857: Midlothian
Party	Candidate	Votes	%	±%
Conservative	William Montagu Douglas Scott	Unopposed		
Registered electors		1,960		
Conservative hold				

General election 1859: Midlothian
Party	Candidate	Votes	%	±%
Conservative	William Montagu Douglas Scott	Unopposed		
Registered electors		1,974		
Conservative hold				

=== 1860s ===
General election 1865: Midlothian
Party	Candidate	Votes	%	±%
Conservative	William Montagu Douglas Scott	Unopposed		
Registered electors		1,656		
Conservative hold				

General election 1868: Midlothian
Party	Candidate	Votes	%	±%
Liberal	Alexander Ramsay-Gibson-Maitland	1,146	55.9	New
Conservative	William Montagu Douglas Scott	905	44.1	N/A
Majority		241	11.8	N/A
Turnout		2,051	82.4	N/A
Registered electors		2,489		
Liberal gain from Conservative		Swing	N/A	

=== 1870s ===
General election 1874: Midlothian
Party	Candidate	Votes	%	±%
Conservative	William Montagu Douglas Scott	1,194	53.0	+8.9
Liberal	William Hay	1,059	47.0	−8.9
Majority		135	6.0	N/A
Turnout		2,253	84.3	+1.9
Registered electors		2,672		
Conservative gain from Liberal		Swing		

=== 1880s ===
General election 1880: Midlothian
Party	Candidate	Votes	%	±%
Liberal	William Ewart Gladstone	1,579	53.6	+6.6
Conservative	William Montagu Douglas Scott	1,368	46.4	−6.6
Majority		211	7.2	N/A
Turnout		2,947	90.4	+6.1
Registered electors		3,260		
Liberal gain from Conservative		Swing	+6.6	

Gladstone's appointment as Prime Minister, First Lord of the Treasury and Chancellor of the Exchequer required a by-election.

By-election, 10 May 1880: Midlothian
Party	Candidate	Votes	%	±%
Liberal	William Ewart Gladstone	Unopposed		
Liberal hold				

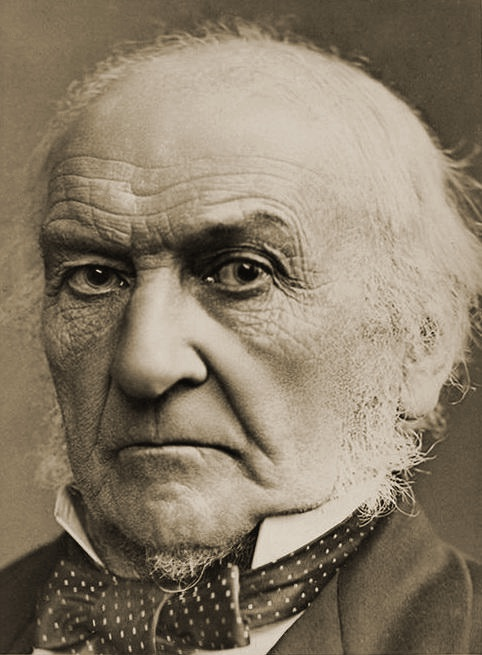
Gladstone

General election 1885: Midlothian
Party	Candidate	Votes	%	±%
Liberal	William Ewart Gladstone	7,879	70.8	+17.2
Conservative	Charles Dalrymple	3,248	29.2	−17.2
Majority		4,631	41.6	+34.4
Turnout		11,127	86.1	−4.3
Registered electors		12,924		
Liberal hold		Swing	+17.2	

Gladstone's appointment as Prime Minister, First Lord of the Treasury and Chancellor of the Exchequer required a by-election.

By-election, 10 Feb 1886: Midlothian
Party	Candidate	Votes	%	±%
Liberal	William Ewart Gladstone	Unopposed		
Liberal hold				

General election 1886: Midlothian
Party	Candidate	Votes	%	±%
Liberal	William Ewart Gladstone	Unopposed		
Liberal hold				

=== 1890s ===
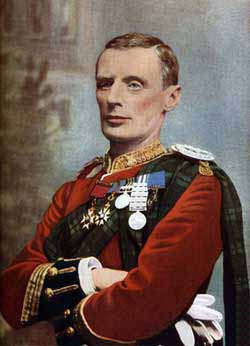
Wauchope

General election 1892: Midlothian
Party	Candidate	Votes	%	±%
Liberal	William Ewart Gladstone	5,845	53.1	N/A
Conservative	Andrew Wauchope	5,155	46.9	New
Majority		690	6.2	N/A
Turnout		11,000	83.1	N/A
Registered electors		13,234		
Liberal hold		Swing	N/A	

Gladstone's appointment as Prime Minister, First Lord of the Treasury and Lord Privy Seal required a by-election.

By-election, 24 Aug 1892: Midlothian
Party	Candidate	Votes	%	±%
Liberal	William Ewart Gladstone	Unopposed		
Liberal hold				

Gibson-Carmichael

General election 1895: Midlothian
Party	Candidate	Votes	%	±%
Liberal	Thomas Gibson-Carmichael	6,090	52.0	−1.1
Liberal Unionist	North de Coigny Dalrymple-Hamilton	5,631	48.0	+1.1
Majority		459	4.0	−2.2
Turnout		11,721	85.2	+2.1
Registered electors		13,750		
Liberal hold		Swing	−1.1	

=== 1900s ===
General election 1900: Midlothian
Party	Candidate	Votes	%	±%
Liberal	Alexander Murray	5,804	51.4	−0.6
Liberal Unionist	North de Coigny Dalrymple-Hamilton	5,490	48.6	+0.6
Majority		314	2.8	−1.2
Turnout		11,294	80.7	−4.5
Registered electors		13,991		
Liberal hold		Swing	−0.6	

Dalmeny

General election 1906: Midlothian
Party	Candidate	Votes	%	±%
Liberal	Harry Primrose	8,348	61.9	+10.5
Conservative	Frank J. Usher	5,131	38.1	−10.5
Majority		3,217	23.8	+21.0
Turnout		13,479	85.8	+5.1
Registered electors		15,711		
Liberal hold		Swing	+10.5	

=== 1910s ===
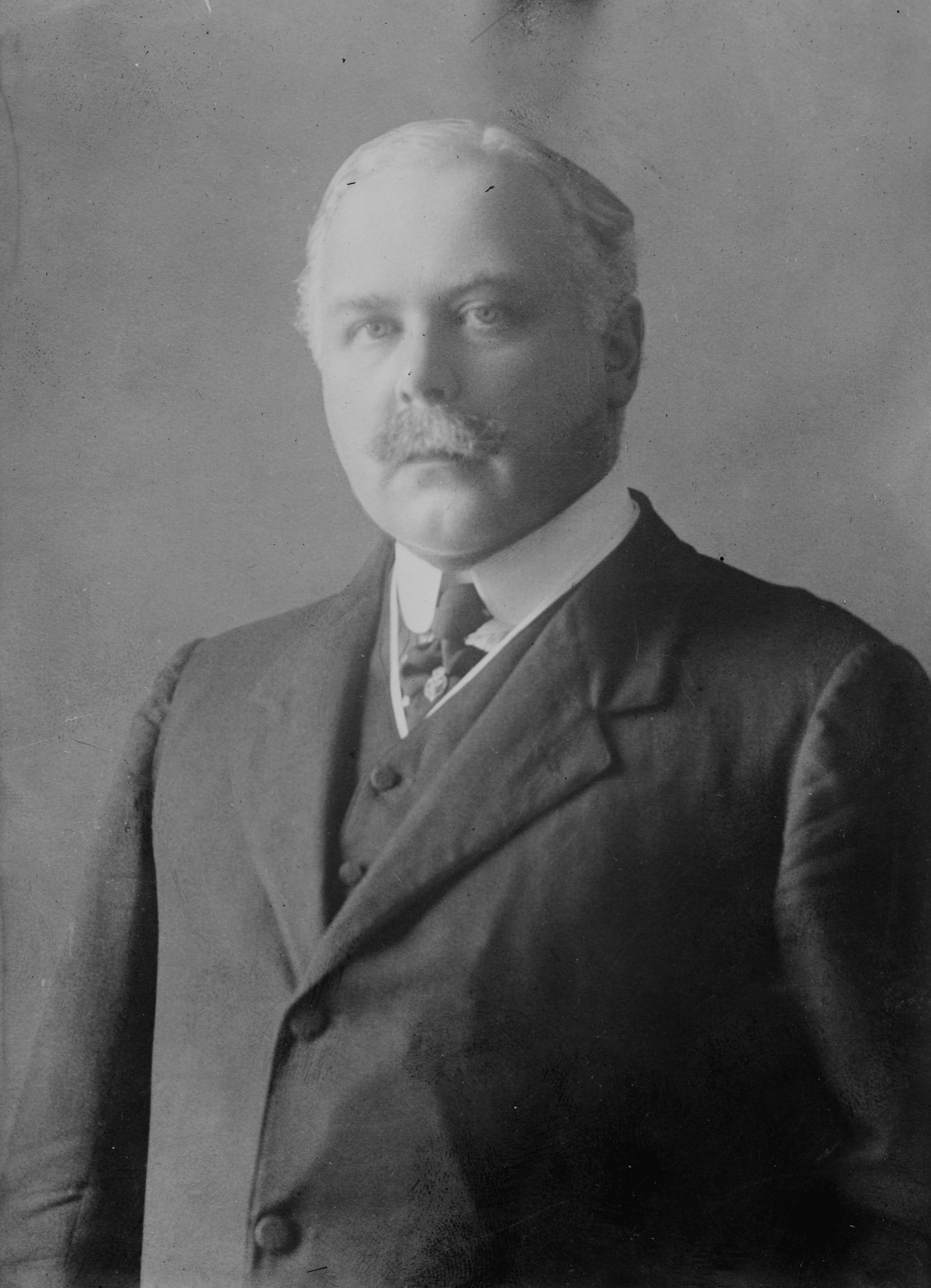
Elibank

General election January 1910: Midlothian
Party	Candidate	Votes	%	±%
Liberal	Alexander Murray	9,062	62.5	+0.6
Conservative	Mountstuart Elphinstone	5,427	37.5	−0.6
Majority		3,635	25.0	+1.2
Turnout		14,489	84.5	−1.3
Registered electors		17,141		
Liberal hold		Swing	+0.6	

General election December 1910: Midlothian
Party	Candidate	Votes	%	±%
Liberal	Alexander Murray	8,837	60.9	−1.6
Conservative	John Hope	5,680	39.1	+1.6
Majority		3,157	21.8	−3.2
Turnout		14,517	82.3	−2.2
Registered electors		17,639		
Liberal hold		Swing	−1.6	

Shaw

1912 Midlothian by-election
Party	Candidate	Votes	%	±%
Unionist	John Hope	6,021	41.8	+2.7
Liberal	Alexander Shaw	5,989	41.5	−19.4
Labour	Robert Brown	2,413	16.7	New
Majority		32	0.3	N/A
Turnout		14,423	80.8	−1.5
Registered electors		17,847		
Unionist gain from Liberal		Swing	+11.1	

== Notes and references ==
Leigh Rayment's Historical List of MPs – Constituencies beginning with "M" (part 2)

Parliament of the United Kingdom
Vacant since 1876 Title last held by Buckinghamshire	Constituency represented by the prime minister 1880–1885	Vacant until 1902 Title next held by Manchester East
Vacant since 1876 Title last held by Buckinghamshire	Constituency represented by the prime minister 1 February – 20 July 1886	Vacant until 1902 Title next held by Manchester East
Vacant since 1876 Title last held by Buckinghamshire	Constituency represented by the prime minister 1892–1895	Vacant until 1902 Title next held by Manchester East
