= William Forbes (MP) =

British politician

Member of Parliament for Stirlingshire
- In office 14 July 1841 – c. January 1855
- Preceded by: George Abercromby
- Succeeded by: Peter Blackburn
- In office 17 January 1835 – 30 April 1838
- Preceded by: Charles Elphinstone Fleeming
- Succeeded by: George Abercromby

Personal details
- Born: 1806
- Died: c. January 1855
- Party: Conservative

William Forbes (1806 – c. January 1855) was a British Conservative politician.

Forbes was elected Conservative MP for Stirlingshire at the 1835 general election. However, after winning the seat again at the 1837 general election, he was unseated on petition in favour of George Abercromby in 1838, after at least one vote had been wrongly ascribed to the wrong candidate. He later regained the seat, at the 1841 general election, and held it until his death in 1855.

Parliament of the United Kingdom
Preceded by Charles Elphinstone Fleeming	Member of Parliament for Stirlingshire; 1835–1838	Succeeded by George Abercromby
Preceded by George Abercromby	Member of Parliament for Stirlingshire; 1841–1855	Succeeded by Peter Blackburn
