= Sir Archibald Edmonstone, 3rd Baronet =

British traveller and writer

Sir Archibald Edmonstone, 3rd Baronet (12 March 1795 – 15 March 1871) was a British traveller and writer.

== Biography ==
Edmonstone, the eldest son of Sir Charles Edmonstone, 2nd Baronet, by his first wife Emma, fifth daughter of Richard Wilbraham Bootle of Rode Hall, Cheshire, and sister of Edward Bootle-Wilbraham, 1st Baron Skelmersdale, was born at 32 Great Russell Street, Bloomsbury, London, on 12 March 1795, and entered Eton in 1808. He removed in 1812 to Christ Church, Oxford, where he proceeded B.A. on 29 November 1816.

In 1819 he went to Egypt, where he visited and explored two of the oases in the great desert, of which he published an account, with views and plans of the ruined temples and tombs. On the death of his father, 1 April 1821, he succeeded to the baronetcy, and fruitlessly contested his father's parliamentary constituency, Stirlingshire, 24 May 1821.

He married, on 10 October 1832, his cousin-german Emma, third daughter of Randle Wilbraham of Rode Hall, Cheshire, and had issue three daughters, who all died in their infancy.

He died at 34 Wilton Place, Belgrave Square, London, on 13 March 1871, leaving a personal fortune of £12,000.

== Publications ==
1. A Journey to Two of the Oases of Upper Egypt, 1822.
2. Leonora, a tragedy in five acts and in verse, 1832.
3. Tragedies, 1837.
4. The Christian Gentleman's Daily Walk, 1840, 2nd edit. 1843, 3rd edit. 1850.
5. The Progress of Religion, a poem, 1842.
6. Thoughts on the Observance of Lent, 1848.
7. A Letter to the Bishop of Glasgow and Galloway on the Present Aspect of Church Matters, 1850.
8. Meditations in Verse for the Sundays and Holydays throughout the Year, 1853.
9. Devotional Reflections in Verse, arranged in accordance with the Church Calendar, 1858.
10. Short Readings on the Collects, 1861.
11. Spiritual Communings, 1869.

== Notes ==
Baronetage of Great Britain
Preceded by Charles Edmonstone	Baronet (of Duntreath); 1821–1871	Succeeded by William Edmonstone
