= Donald Mackenzie Smeaton =

Scottish politician

Donald Mackenzie Smeaton CSI (9 September 1848 – 19 April 1910) was a Scottish colonial administrator in India and Burma and politician who was the Liberal MP for Stirlingshire from January 1906 until January 1910.

== Life ==
Born the son of David James Smeaton, Donald was educated at the Abbey Park Institution, St. Andrew's, a boarding school run by his father, at which not less than 80 young men were boarded and educated. He then attended the University of St Andrews, where he graduated with an M.A. degree. Joining the Indian Civil Service in 1865 via open competition, he arrived in India in 1867, Smeaton held minor appointments in the North-Western Provinces.

On 5 September 1873, Smeaton married Annette Louisa Lushington, daughter of Sir Henry Lushington (1826-1898), 4th Bt. and Elizabeth Cheape.

In 1879, he went to Burma, where he served as Chief Secretary in 1887, officiated as Chief Commissioner in 1892 and 1896 and was a member of the Legislative Council of Burma from 1898 and Burma member on the Central Legislative Council from 1898–9 until 1901–2. He had hoped to succeed Sir Frederick Fryer as Lieutenant-Governor of Burma; but Lord Curzon deliberately asked Fryer to stay another year, so that Smeaton, who reached his mandatory retirement age during the interval, could not succeed Fryer. Smeaton engaged in a letter-writing campaign against Fryer and Curzon, which caused much embarrassment.

He was made Companion of the Order of the Star of India in 1895, was awarded the Kaisar-i-Hind Medal in 1900 and retired in 1902. Smeaton published editions of the North-Western Provinces Revenue Act, The Currency of India and The Karens of Burma.

== Death ==
He died in April 1910 aged 61, three months after retiring from Parliament.

Parliament of the United Kingdom
Preceded by James McKillop	Member of Parliament for Stirlingshire; 1906 – January 1910	Succeeded by William Allan Chapple
