= William Jacks =

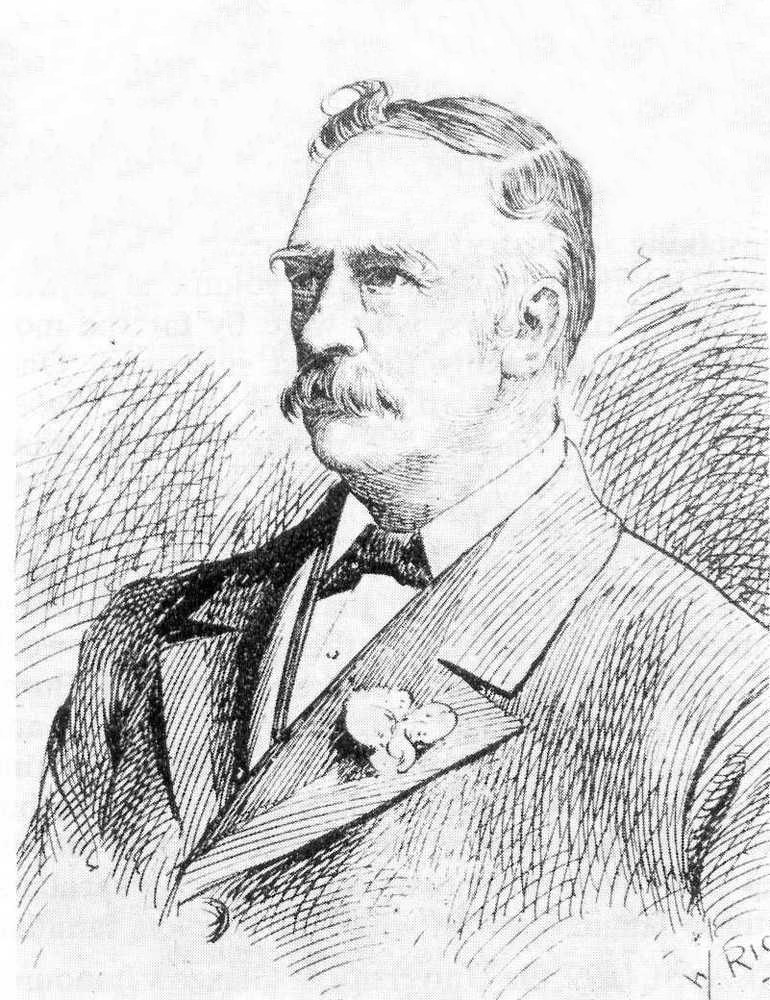

Member of Parliament for Stirlingshire
- In office 1892–1895
- Preceded by: Joseph Cheney Bolton
- Succeeded by: James McKillop

Member of Parliament for Leith District of Burghs
- In office 1885–1886
- Preceded by: Andrew Grant
- Succeeded by: William Ewart Gladstone

Personal details
- Born: 18 March 1841 Cornhill-on-Tweed, Northumberland
- Died: 9 August 1907 (aged 66) The Gart, Callander, Stirlingshire
- Party: Liberal
- Other political affiliations: Liberal Unionist (1886)
- Profession: Politician, businessman, ironmaster

William Jacks (18 March 1841 – 9 August 1907) was a British ironmaster, author and Liberal politician.

== Early life ==
Jacks was born at Cornhill-on-Tweed, near Coldstream, Northumberland the son Richard Jacks, a farmer and land steward, and his wife, Mary Lamb. His father died when he was very young and his mother moved to Swinton, near Duns where he was educated at Swinton Village School. He served an apprenticeship in the shipbuilding yard Pile & Co. at West Hartlepool. In his spare time, he studied foreign languages and other subjects and this helped him develop a career in the iron and steel industry.

== Iron merchant ==
Jacks moved to a shipyard in Sunderland, and then became manager of Sunderland and Seaham Engine Works and Foundry. With his language skills, he was sent on an errand to Italy to intercept goods that the buyer did not intend to pay for, and not only retrieved the goods, but sold them at a higher price and obtained fresh business for his employers. He was encouraged to join a business in Glasgow in 1870 and founded the iron and steel merchants William Jacks & Co in 1880. He built and sold steamers, completed large contracts for ironwork, and became a director of several companies. It was in the 1885 that Jacks took as a junior partner in the firm Bonar Law, future Conservative prime minister. Although Jacks' politics were on the opposite side of those of the junior partner, his example may have had an influence on the younger man.

== Political career ==
In 1885 Jacks was elected as the Member of Parliament (MP) for Leith District of Burghs in place of Andrew Grant (MP), but in the 1886 general election which followed Gladstone played what was known as the "Leith dirty trick", standing unopposed and thus ousting his former supporter. In the by-election which followed in August 1886 when Gladstone decided to resume the Midlothian seat he had feared losing, Jacks stood as a Liberal Unionist, but was heavily defeated. In the 1892 general election Jacks stood again as a Liberal and was elected MP for Stirlingshire, but lost that seat in 1895.

Jacks was elected Chairman of the British Iron Trade Association in 1893 and was afterwards President of the West of Scotland Iron and Steel Institute and of Glasgow Chamber of Commerce. He was the first Chairman of Commercial College in Glasgow.

== Literary career ==
Jacks first literary work, published in 1894, was a translation of "Nathan the Wise" by Gotthold Ephraim Lessing. In 1896 he published "Robert Burns in other Tongues," on the centenary of the poet's death.

On the strength of this, Glasgow University awarded him an LLD in 1899. His "Life of Prince Bismarck" brought appreciative letters from Bismarck's son and from Kaiser Wilhelm II, who gave him two volumes, biographies of Wilhelm I and of the Emperor himself. Jack produced "The Life of His Majesty William II., German Emperor, with a Sketch of his Hohenzollern Ancestors" in 1904.

== Personal life ==
Jacks lived for many years at Crosslet, Dunbarton, but in 1901 he purchased the estate of The Gart, near Callander where he died at the age of 66. He left his collection of books on French, German, Italian and French literature to Glasgow University Library and bequeathed £20,000 to create the chair of German Language and Literature (subsequently renamed Modern Languages) that bears his name.

== Notes ==
Parliament of the United Kingdom
Preceded by Andrew Grant	Member of Parliament for Leith District of Burghs; 1885–1886	Succeeded by (William Ewart Gladstone); Ronald Ferguson
Preceded by Joseph Cheney Bolton	Member of Parliament for Stirlingshire; 1892–1895	Succeeded by James McKillop
