= John Erskine (Royal Navy officer) =

Royal Navy Admiral (1806–1887)

Admiral John Erskine
- Born: 13 July 1806
- Died: 23 June 1887 (aged 80)
- Military career
- Allegiance: United Kingdom
- Branch: Royal Navy
- Rank: Admiral
- Commands: HMS Orion
- Conflicts: Crimean War

Admiral John Elphinstone Erskine (13 July 1806 – 23 June 1887) was a Royal Navy officer and Liberal politician who sat in the House of Commons from 1865 to 1874.

== Background and education ==
A member of Clan Erskine, he was the son of David Erskine, of Cardross, Stirling, and the great-grandson of the jurist John Erskine. His mother was the Hon. Keith Elphinstone, the daughter of John Elphinstone, 11th Lord Elphinstone. He was educated at the Royal Naval College, Portsmouth and entered the Royal Navy in 1819.

== Naval career ==
Erskine's first command was the gunboat HMS Arachne on the Jamaica station in 1829. He served in the Mediterranean and was promoted to captain on 28 June 1839. He was the flag captain to his cousin, Sir Charles Adam, on the West Indies station. After three years on half-pay from 1845 to 1847 he was appointed senior officer on HMS Havannah on the Australian station. Between 25 June and 7 October 1849, he toured Samoa, Tonga, Niue, Fiji, the New Hebrides, the Loyalty Islands and New Caledonia. In 1850 he visited the Solomon Islands and other islands and published his account of the expeditions in Journal of Cruise among the Islands of the Western Pacific in H.M.'s ship Havannah in 1853. He also published A short account of the Gold Discoveries in Australia after touring the Australian goldfields in 1850. Erskine commanded HMS Orion in the Baltic during the Crimean War and was present at the Fleet Review of 1856 at Spithead, England. In January 1857 he was stationed on the Coast of Central America. He was Second-in-Command of the Channel Squadron from 1859 until 1861. He became a vice-admiral in 1864 and an admiral in 1869.

== Political career ==
At the 1865 general election Erskine was elected Member of Parliament for Stirlingshire. He held the seat until 1874. In parliament he was leader of the influential lobby working for the Pacific Islanders Protection Act of 1872. Erskine was also a justice of the peace for Stirlingshire. He was a Fellow of the Royal Geographical Society and joined the Aborigines' Protection Society after he had experienced naval anti-slavery operations in the West Indies and seen the impact of European penetration into the Pacific Ocean.

== Personal life ==
Erskine died unmarried in June 1887, aged 80.

== See also ==
- O'Byrne, William Richard (1849). "Erskine, John Elphinstone" . A Naval Biographical Dictionary . John Murray – via Wikisource.

Parliament of the United Kingdom
Preceded by Peter Blackburn	Member of Parliament for Stirlingshire; 1865–1874	Succeeded by Sir William Edmonstone, Bt
