= Archibald Edmonstone of Duntreath =

Scottish landowner and courtier

Archibald Edmondstone of Duntreath (died 1502) was a Scottish landowner and courtier.

== Background ==
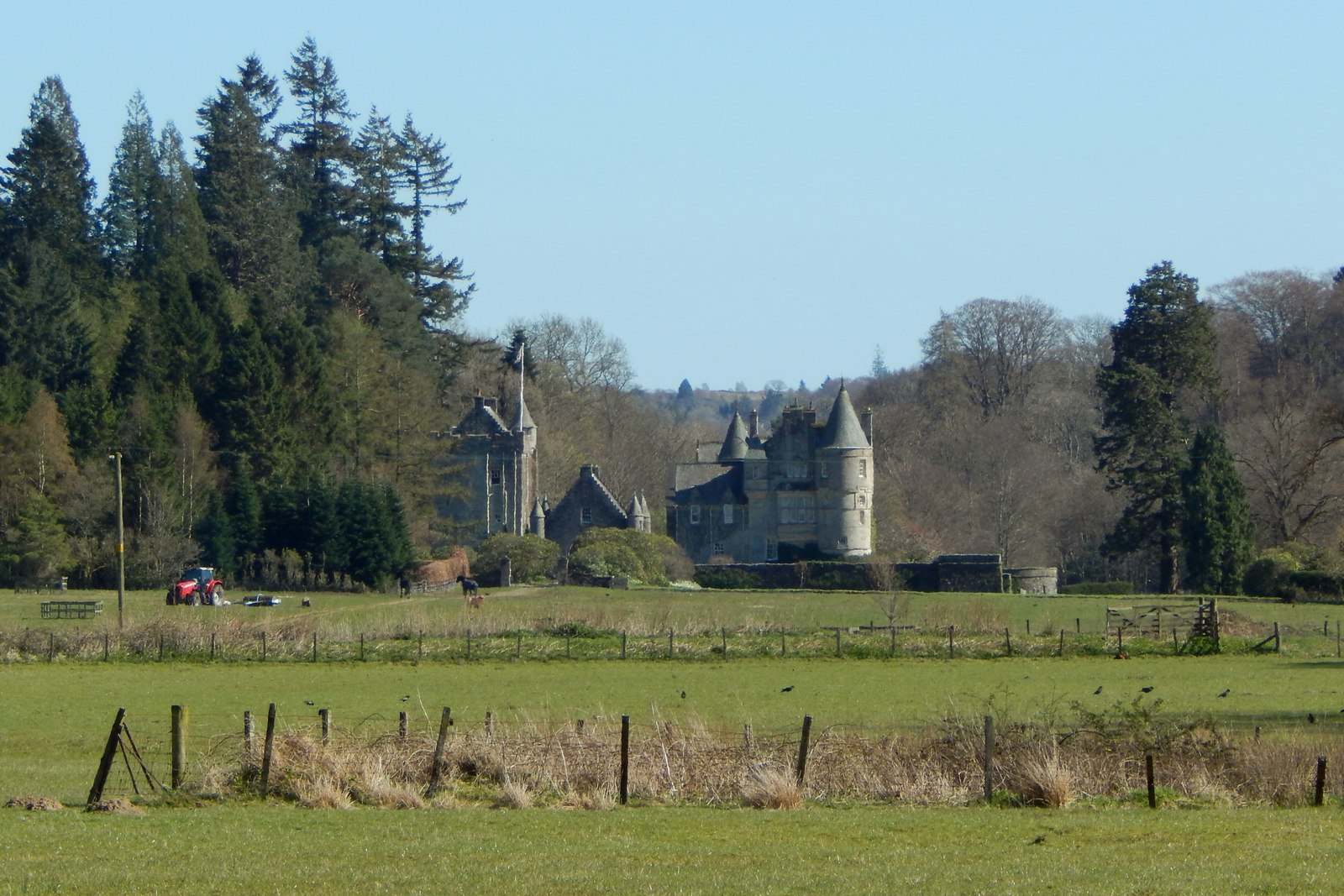
Duntreath Castle

His home was Duntreath Castle, Blanefield, Stirlingshire. He was the son of William Edmonstone, and he became the third Edmonstone laird of Duntreath. The surname is sometime spelled as "Edmonston". The family held additional lands in Menteith from the Scottish crown.

== Royal service ==
Archibald and his son William Edmonstone served James IV of Scotland. Archibald was the king's butler, an auditor of the Scottish exhequer, steward of Menteith, keeper of Doune Castle, keeper of the forest of Menteith, and keeper of the forest of Glen Finglas. Archibald held lands in Menteith to provide an income for maintaining Doune Castle. He was paid for hosting James Stewart, Duke of Ross, at Doune for three weeks in 1495.

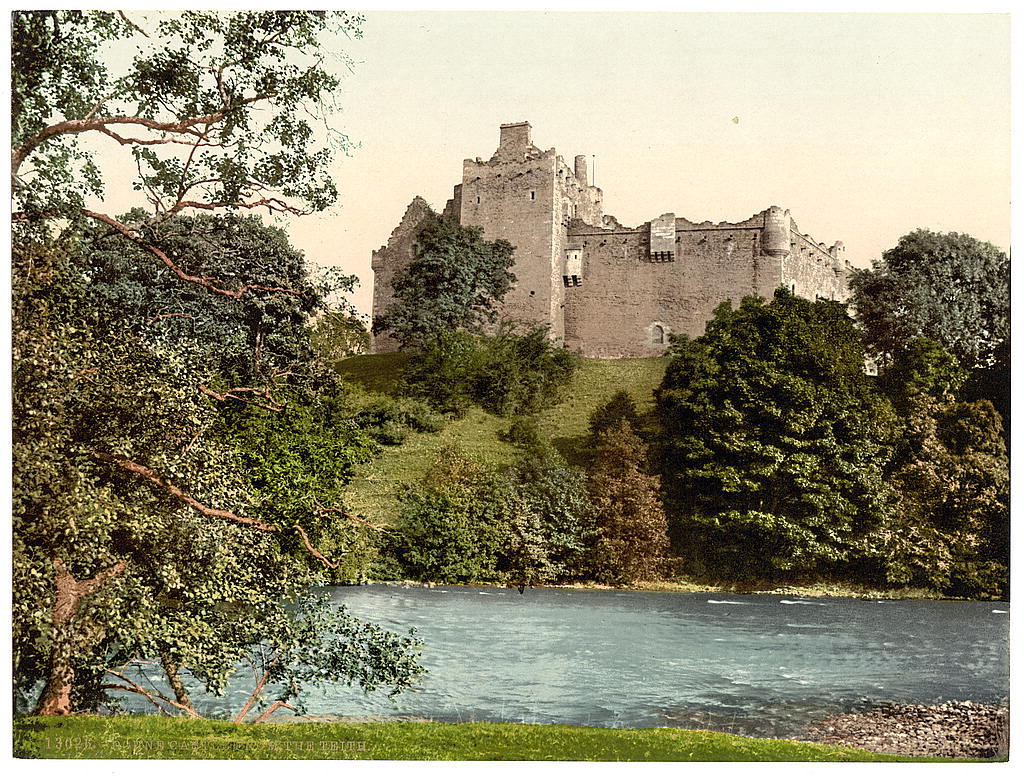
The Edmonstone family were keepers of Doune Castle

Doune was regarded as a dower house for the Scottish queens consort. James IV granted it to his mistress Janet Kennedy in 1502, before his marriage to Margaret Tudor. The keepership of the castle and Menteith lands occasionally brought the Edmonstone family into conflict and feud with other landowners claiming property rights in Menteith.

As keeper of the hunting forest at Glen Finglas, Archibald Edmonstone was involved in hosting the royal hunting household at the Hunt Hall in the glen and providing food. Edmonstone was obliged to send food such as venison to the royal court, especially when banquets were planned for ambassadors.

Archibald Edmondstone married Janet Schaw, a daughter of James Schaw of Sauchie. Their eldest son, William Edmonstone, was also appointed as the king's butler. Another member of the family, James Edmonstone, was keeper of the king's silver vessels.

William Edmondstone, married Sibilla Baillie from Lamington, and secondly Elizabeth Leslie, a daughter of George Leslie, 1st Earl of Rothes who was the Countess of Errol by her first marriage. He was killed at the battle of Flodden in 1513. His sons, William and Archibald Edmonstone, were appointed joint keepers of Doune Castle for Margaret Tudor in 1516, although they were both still minors.

Archibald Edmonstone of Duntreath is an ancestor of Queen Camilla.
