= Peter Blackburn (MP) =

British Conservative politician

Member of Parliament for Stirlingshire
- In office 5 February 1855 – 19 July 1865
- Preceded by: William Forbes
- Succeeded by: John Erskine

Personal details
- Born: 31 December 1811
- Died: 20 May 1870 (aged 58)
- Party: Conservative
- Spouse: Jean Wedderburn (m. 1835)
- Children: 13
- Parent(s): John Blackburn; Rebecca Louise Gillies
- Relatives: Colin Blackburn (brother); Hugh Blackburn (brother)

Peter Blackburn (31 December 1811 – 20 May 1870) was a British Conservative Party politician.

== Family and early life ==
Blackburn was the son of Jamaica proprietor John Blackburn of Killearn and Rebecca Louise Gillies, and the brother of Scottish Law Lord Colin Blackburn and mathematician Hugh Blackburn. In 1835, he married Jean Wedderburn, daughter of James Wedderburn and Isabella Clerk, and they had at least eight sons and five daughters, including: John (born 1843); James (1845–1892); Peter (born 1847); Andrew Cathcart (1851–1887); Colin George (1853–1888); Hugh (born 1855); Adam Gillies (1858–1891); Arthur Octavius (1862–1889); Isabella; Rebecca Marion (died 1914); Jean; Helen Agnes; and Mary.

Blackburn started his career in the military as a cornet in the 2nd Regiment of Life Guards in 1830, before retiring as a lieutenant in 1837. He then became a Justice of the Peace and Deputy Lieutenant for Stirlingshire. In 1846, he became chairman of the Edinburgh and Glasgow Railway.

== Political career ==
A Liberal-Conservative, Blackburn was elected MP for Stirlingshire at a by-election in 1855, caused by the death of William Forbes. In 1859, he was appointed a junior Lord Commissioner of the Treasury, although with little enthusiasm. In correspondence between the-then Chancellor of the Exchequer Benjamin Disraeli and Edward Smith-Stanley, 14th Earl of Derby, sent in August 1858, Smith-Stanley said: "Blackburn would be a respectable appointment, but there is no particular reason for him."

He held the seat until 1865 when he was defeated by the Liberal John Erskine. While being recognised as "shrewd, energetic and practical" in his role, his defeat was credited to impolite actions regarding the commercial treaty, the county franchise, and game laws.

Parliament of the United Kingdom
Preceded by William Forbes	Member of Parliament for Stirlingshire; 1855–1865	Succeeded by John Erskine
