= William Gibson-Craig =

Scottish advocate and politician

The Right Honourable Sir William Gibson Craig
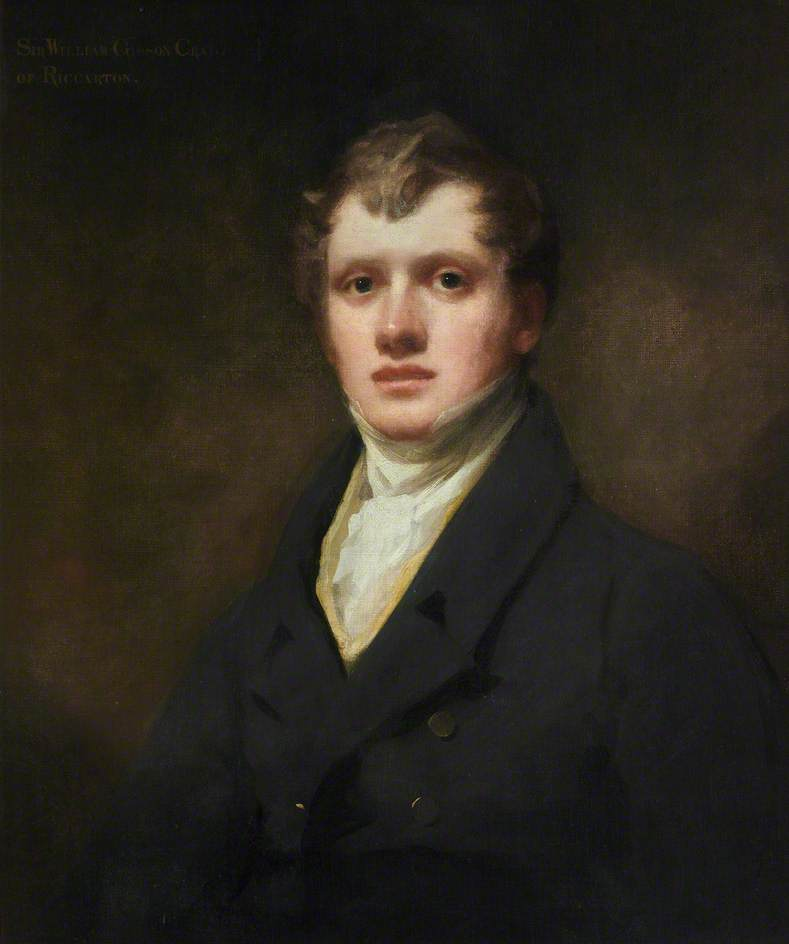
- Portrait by Henry Raeburn

Member of Parliament for Edinburgh
- In office 1841–1852

Member of Parliament for Midlothian
- In office 1837–1841

Personal details
- Born: 2 August 1797
- Died: 12 March 1878 (aged 82)
- Party: Whig
- Profession: Advocate, Politician

Sir William Gibson Craig, 2nd Baronet, PC, FRSE (2 August 1797 – 12 March 1878), was a Scottish advocate and politician, who held the important position of Lord Clerk Register for Scotland.

== Life ==
He was born the first son of Sir James Gibson-Craig, 1st Baronet, and his wife, Anne Thomson. He was educated at the High School in Edinburgh and then privately in Yorkshire.

William became an advocate in 1820. He became a member of the Highland Society in 1824. In 1828 he was elected a Fellow of the Royal Society of Edinburgh his proposer being Thomas Allan.

He was the Member of Parliament for Midlothian representing the Whig party from 1837 to 1841 and for Edinburgh from 1841 to 1852. He was a Junior Lord of the Treasury in Lord John Russell's government from 1846 to 1852. He was appointed a Deputy Lieutenant for Midlothian in 1848, and to the Board of Supervision in 1854.

He was Lord Clerk Register and Keeper of the Signet from 1862 until his death. He was made a Privy Counsellor in 1863.

He held office as Keeper of the Privy Seal of the Prince of Wales until 1852.

He lived in Riccarton House to the south-west of Edinburgh. This huge Gothic mansion was demolished in the 20th century and now serves as the Riccarton Campus serving Heriot Watt University.

== Family ==
His younger brother, James Thomson Gibson-Craig WS (1799–1886) was also a Fellow of the Royal Society of Edinburgh.

He was married to Betsy Vivian. They had six children.

One of his grandchildren was the philanthropist Dorothy Brooke.

== Publications ==
- On Howard's Wheel Plough

Parliament of the United Kingdom
Preceded by Sir George Clerk, Bt	Member of Parliament for Midlothian; 1837–1841	Succeeded by William Ramsay Ramsay
Preceded by Sir John Campbell; Thomas Babington Macaulay	Member of Parliament for Edinburgh; 1841–1852; With: Thomas Babington Macaulay to 1847; Charles Cowan from 1847	Succeeded by Thomas Babington Macaulay; Charles Cowan
Political offices
Preceded by Henry Bingham Baring; William Cripps; Swynford Carnegie; Ralph Neville	Junior Lord of the Treasury; 1846–1852	Succeeded by Marquess of Chandos; The Lord Henry Lennox; Thomas Bateson
Preceded by Marquess of Dalhousie	Lord Clerk Register; 1862–1878	Succeeded by Earl of Glasgow
Baronetage of the United Kingdom
Preceded by James Gibson Craig	Baronet (of Carmichael); 1850–1878	Succeeded by James Gibson Craig
