= William Ramsay (MP) =

British politician (1809–1850)

William Ramsay Ramsay

Member of Parliament for Stirlingshire
- In office 11 May 1831 – 27 December 1832
- Preceded by: Henry Home-Drummond
- Succeeded by: Charles Elphinstone Fleeming

Member of Parliament for Midlothian
- In office 6 July 1841 – 23 June 1845
- Preceded by: William Gibson-Craig
- Succeeded by: John Hope

Personal details
- Born: 29 May 1809
- Died: 15 March 1850 (aged 40)
- Party: Conservative/Tory

William Ramsay Ramsay of Barnton and Sauchie (29 May 1809 – 15 March 1850) was a British Conservative Party and Tory politician.

== Life ==
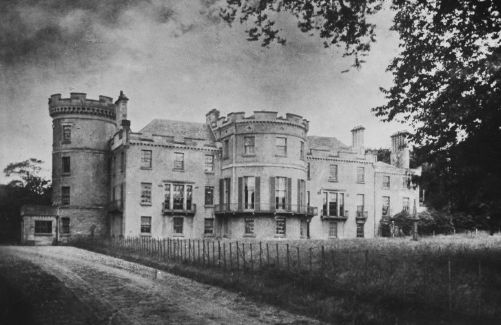
Barnton House c.1870

He was born in Barnton House west of Edinburgh, on 29 May 1809, the eldest son of George Ramsay and his wife Jean Hamilton, daughter of John Hamilton Baron Belhaven. Barnton House (previously known as Cramond Regis) was commissioned by his father in 1784 to replace an earlier house, and was designed by Robert Adam. It was extended by architect David Hamilton in 1810.

He was privately tutored then studied at Christ Church, Oxford graduating in 1828, and later that year married Mary Sandilands, daughter of James Sandilands, 10th Lord Torpichen—with whom he had 1 son, Charles William Ramsay (1844–1865). He inherited the estates of his father when "still an infant", an event which saw him conferred the distinction of "the richest commoner in Scotland".

Ramsay was elected Tory MP for Stirlingshire at the 1831 general election, when invited to do so by Thomas Stirling, and campaigned on a platform of a determination to "uphold unimpaired the institutions of the country". He said, however, he was "free and unfettered from any pledges whatever" but claimed to be "friendly to a fair, liberal safe and equitably reform" but "decidedly opposed" to "altogether too sweeping and irrevocable reforms". In the House of Commons, he voted against the second and third readings of the English reform bill and voted to reject the second reading of the Scottish version of the bill. He stood down at the next election a year later. He was later, in 1841, elected Conservative MP for Midlothian, but resigned four years later by accepting the office of Steward of the Chiltern Hundreds.

He died in Barnton House on 15 March 1850. He was succeeded by his only son, Charles William Ramsay, aged only six. Charles died unmarried and childless 15 years later.

Barnton House was demolished around 1960 but the Gothic style gatepiers of 1810 still exist on Whitehouse Road.

Parliament of the United Kingdom
Preceded by Henry Home-Drummond	Member of Parliament for Stirlingshire; 1831–1832	Succeeded by Charles Elphinstone Fleeming
Preceded by William Gibson-Craig	Member of Parliament for Midlothian; 1841–1845	Succeeded by John Hope
