= Joseph Cheney Bolton =

Scottish merchant and politician

Joseph Cheney Bolton (1819 – 14 March 1901) was a Scottish merchant and a Liberal Party politician.

As a partner in the firm of Ker, Bolton, & Co., East India merchants, of Glasgow and London, he was a J.P. for Stirlingshire and Lanarkshire.

At the 1874 general election Bolton stood unsuccessfully for Parliament in the Glasgow constituency, where he won less than 1% of the votes. However, at the next general election, 1880, he was elected as the Member of Parliament (MP) for Stirlingshire. He held the seat until he stood down at the 1892 general election.

Bolton died at the age of 81.

Parliament of the United Kingdom
Preceded by Sir William Edmonstone	Member of Parliament for Stirlingshire; 1880–1892	Succeeded by William Jacks
