= Charles Elphinstone Fleeming =

British politician and Royal Navy Admiral (1774–1840)

Admiral The Honourable Charles Elphinstone Fleeming
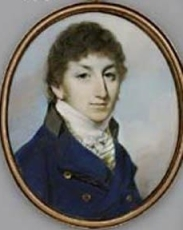
- Born: 18 June 1774
- Died: 30 October 1840 (aged 66); Leamington
- Military career
- Allegiance: United Kingdom
- Branch: Royal Navy
- Rank: Admiral of the Blue
- Commands: HMS Tisiphone; HMS Tartar; HMS Diomede; HMS Egyptienne; HMS Revenge; HMS Bulwark; HMS Standard; HMS San Juan; HMS Elizabeth; West Indies Station; Nore Command; Portsmouth Command
- Conflicts: Battle of Cape Finisterre

Charles Elphinstone Fleeming (18 June 1774 – 30 October 1840) was a British admiral of the Royal Navy who served during the French Revolutionary and Napoleonic Wars. He commanded a succession of smaller vessels during the early years of the wars, achieving some successes against French cruisers, merchants and privateers, before losing his ship on one operation. Combining his naval career with periods of political activity he took part in only one major fleet operation, the Battle of Cape Finisterre in 1805, but spent several years as a Member of Parliament. Connected by birth to a major noble landowning family several of his children went on to inherit or marry into titles and rank in the British peerage. Charles himself died an Admiral of the Blue with extensive Scottish estates.

== Family and early life ==
Born Charles Elphinstone in 1774, he was the son of John Elphinstone, the 11th Lord Elphinstone, and his wife Anne Ruthven. He entered the Navy and by March 1794 and the age of 20 had reached the rank of commander aboard the sloop HMS Tisiphone. He moved aboard the 26-gun HMS Tartar on 7 October 1795 and commanded her until her loss in 1797 while attempting to cut some French merchantmen out under the batteries at Puerto Plata, on Saint-Domingue. He was then appointed to the 50-gun HMS Diomede in March 1798 which he commanded initially in the North Sea, but departing for the Cape of Good Hope on 6 December that year. He spent the rest of the war on the East Indies station, stepping down in December 1802 following the Peace of Amiens. He briefly entered politics during this period, having been elected Member of Parliament for the constituency of Stirlingshire on 13 January 1802. He had assumed the name Fleeming on the death of his grandmother, the only surviving child of John, 6th Earl of Wigtoun, and his succeeding to the family's estates.

== Napoleonic Wars ==
With the outbreak of the Napoleonic Wars in 1803 Elphinstone returned to active service, commanding the 40-gun HMS Egyptienne from April that year. While Fleeming was in command the Egyptienne took the 16-gun Epervier on 27 July, and the 14-gun privateer Chiffonette on 30 August 1803. Serving aboard the Egyptienne as a midshipman during this time was future-Admiral Charles John Napier. The two were on bad terms, that would later lead to Napier challenging Fleeming to a duel. The two met at the appointed time, but were reconciled by their seconds, and did not fight. The two were not fully reconciled as friends though until some years later. Fleeming and the Egyptienne supported Vice-Admiral Robert Calder's fleet at the Battle of Cape Finisterre on 22 July 1805.

Egyptienne did not participate in the fighting herself, but while reconnoitring in advance of the fleet she captured a Danish merchant brig. After the battle she took the disabled Spanish 74-gun Firme into tow. After the battle, Admiral Robert Calder requested a court-martial to review his decision not to pursue the enemy fleet after the engagement. Fleeming was one of the witnesses. The court martial ruled that Calder's failure to pursue was an error of judgement, not a manifestation of cowardice, and severely reprimanded him.

On 2 October Egyptienne captured the French brig-sloop Acteon, under Capitaine de Frégate Depoge, off Rochefort. She was armed with 16 6-pounder guns and had a crew of 126 men. The navy took Acteon into service under her own name. On 20 November Egyptienne captured the 12-gun Spanish letter of marque Paulina. The chase took nine hours, during which the Paulina threw eight of her guns overboard. She was out of Pasajes (Spain), on her way to cruise the West Indies.

By late December Fleeming had left Egyptienne and was at Calder's court-martial. Fleeming then moved to command HMS Revenge in 1806, HMS Bulwark with the Mediterranean Fleet in 1807, and HMS Standard in 1811. He was appointed a Colonel of Royal Marines on 12 August 1812, and reached flag rank with a promotion to rear-admiral on 4 December 1814. He was appointed commander-in-chief at Gibraltar in 1814 and became the first Master of the Royal Calpe Hunt.

== Later life ==
Fleeming continued to rise through the ranks after the end of the wars with France. He was made a vice-admiral on 19 July 1821, was in command at the West Indies by 1828, and became an admiral in 1837. He had been re-elected three times as MP for Stirlingshire before his naval career intervened, but returned to politics during his retirement from active service, regaining the seat in 1832 and holding it until 1835. Fleeming married 16-year-old Doña Cataline Paulina Alesandro de Jiminez in June 1816 in the Cathedral of Santa Cruz in Cadiz; he was 42. The marriage produced a son, John, who was born on 11 December 1819, and four daughters. One daughter, Clementina, married Cornwallis Maude, 1st Earl de Montalt and became a celebrated photographer. John meanwhile inherited the title of Lord Elphinstone in 1860 after the death without issue of John Elphinstone, 13th Lord Elphinstone. Another daughter, Anne Elizabeth, who was born off Venezuela aboard Fleeming's flagship, HMS Barham in 1828, married William Cunningham Bontine of Gartmore and Ardoch, and had three sons, the eldest of which was the author, adventurer and politician Robert Bontine Cunninghame Graham.

Fleeming was Commander-in-Chief, West Indies from 1828 to 1829, Commander-in-Chief, The Nore from 1834 to 1837 and briefly Commander-in-Chief, Portsmouth from April to November 1839. He succeeded Sir Thomas Hardy as Governor of Greenwich Hospital in September 1839, holding the position until his death from influenza at Leamington on 30 October 1840 at the age of 66. He was buried in Leamington parish church on 7 November.

== Notes ==
Parliament of the United Kingdom
| Preceded by Sir George Keith Elphinstone | Member of Parliament for Stirlingshire; 1802–1812 | Succeeded by Sir Charles Edmonstone |
| Preceded by William Ramsay Ramsay | Member of Parliament for Stirlingshire; 1832–1835 | Succeeded by William Forbes |
Military offices
| Preceded by Lawrence Halsted | Commander-in-Chief, West Indies; 1828–1829 | Succeeded by Post merged with C-in-C, North American Station |
| Preceded by Sir Richard King | Commander-in-Chief, The Nore; 1834–1837 | Succeeded by Sir Robert Otway |
| Preceded by Sir Philip Durham | Commander-in-Chief, Portsmouth; April 1839 – November 1839 | Succeeded by Sir Edward Codrington |
