= James MacKillop =

British politician

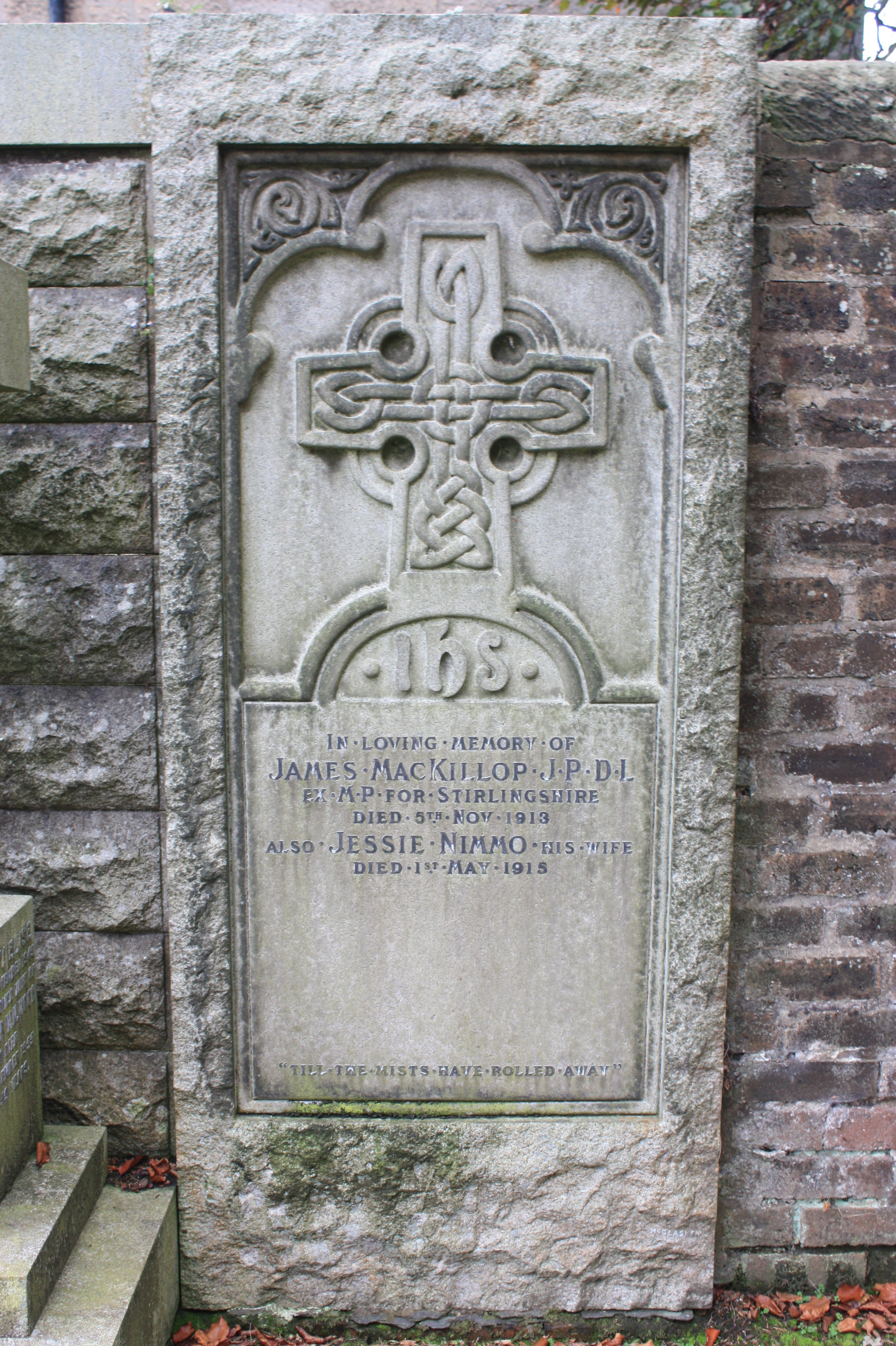
The grave of James MacKillop, Grange Cemetery, Edinburgh

James MacKillop (1844–1913) was Unionist MP for Stirlingshire.

== Life ==
A businessman and engineer MacKillop made his fortune in the coal-mining industry.

It is thought he was related to James MacKillop, MP (1786–1870), also from Stirlingshire.

He was first elected in 1895, re-elected in 1900, but stood down in 1906.

At the end of his life he is listed at 24 Blantyre Terrace in the Merchiston area on the west side of Edinburgh.

He died on 5 November 1913.

He is buried in Grange Cemetery in Edinburgh with his wife, Jessie Nimmo. The grave lies on the southern wall of the south-west extension.

Parliament of the United Kingdom
Preceded by William Jacks	Member of Parliament for Stirlingshire; 1895–1906	Succeeded by Donald Mackenzie Smeaton
