= John Edmonstone of that Ilk =

- Died: c. 1410
- Noble family: Edmonstone family
- Spouse: Isabella of Scotland
- Father: John Edmonstone of Boyne

John Edmonstone of that Ilk (died c. 1410), was a Scottish nobleman.

== Life ==
John was the eldest son of John Edmonstone of Boyne. He fought at the Battle of Otterburn in 1388, in which Scottish forces defeated the English forces of Henry Percy and his brother Ralph Percy, with the Percy brothers and many other English nobles taken prisoner. As part of the dowry of his wife, he received the village of Ednam.

== Family and issue ==
John married Lady Isabel, the widow of James Douglas, 2nd Earl of Douglas, who was the daughter of King Robert II of Scotland and Elizabeth Mure. They are known to have had two sons:

- David Edmonstone, oldest son and heir.
- Sir William Edmonstone of Culloden and Duntreath, first of Duntreath.
