= Sir Archibald Edmonstone, 1st Baronet =

Scottish politician

Sir Archibald Edmonstone, 1st Baronet (10 October 1717 – 20 July 1807), also 11th of Duntreath, was a Scottish politician.

Born at Dumbarton, Silver Banks, he was the son of Archibald Edmonstone, 10th of Duntreath, and his wife Anne Campbell (d. Ireland, 2 November 1785, paternal granddaughter of Archibald Campbell, 9th Earl of Argyll and maternal granddaughter of John Elphinstone, 8th Lord Elphinstone and sister of the John Campbell, 4th Duke of Argyll). He was Gentleman Usher of the Black Rod in Ireland from 1763 to 1765. He succeeded his father in 1768. By the time of his inheritance he was member of parliament for the Dumbartonshire, to which seat he was elected in 1761, 1768, and 1774. In 1780 he was chosen for Ayr Burghs but was again Member for Dumbartonshire in 1790, and continued to hold this office until he retired from Parliament in 1799. A staunch Tory supporter, he upheld Lord North's government during the American War of Independence, and due to his public services, he was created a baronet on 20 May 1774.

Edmonstone married firstly October 1753, Susanna Mary Harenc (d. 4 July 1776), daughter of Roger Harenc (d. 10 June 1763), a French gentleman from Paris who had settled in England around 1720, and wife Susanna Hays. They had five sons and three daughters. Secondly he married Hester, daughter of Sir John Heathcoate, who died without children in 1797. Edmonstone, having lived to be eighty nine, died in his house in Argyll Street in London in July 1807. His five sons all had distinguished careers; however, since his two eldest sons had predeceased him, he was succeeded by his third son Charles.

Parliament of Great Britain
Preceded by John Campbell	Member of Parliament for Dumbartonshire; 1761–1780	Succeeded by Lord Frederick Campbell
Preceded by Frederick Stuart	Member of Parliament for Ayr Burghs; 1780–1790	Succeeded by Charles Stuart
Preceded by George Elphinstone	Member of Parliament for Dumbartonshire; 1790–1796	Succeeded by William Cunninghame Bontine
Baronetage of Great Britain
New creation	Baronet (of Duntreath); 1774–1807	Succeeded by Charles Edmonstone
