= William Edmonstone =

Royal Navy Admiral (1810–1888)

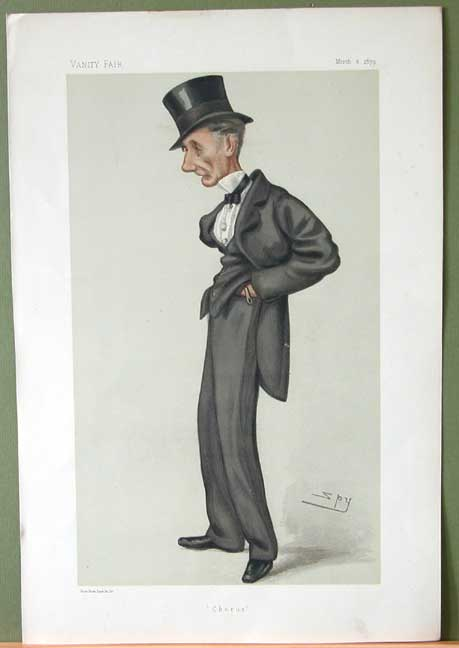
"Chorus". Caricature by Spy published in Vanity Fair in 1879

Admiral Sir William Edmonstone, 4th Baronet, CB, DL (29 January 1810 – 18 February 1888), also 14th of Duntreath, was a British naval commander, courtier and Conservative politician.

== Life ==
Born at Hampton, Edmonstone joined the Royal Navy in his teenage years, serving as a midshipman on the frigate HMS Sybelle and was subsequently promoted Commodore. On return from naval service off West Africa he was made an Aide-de-Camp to Queen Victoria and appointed a Companion of the Order of the Bath (CB). He went on to serve with the rank of Captain as Superintendent of Woolwich Dockyard. He was promoted Rear-Admiral on 3 July 1869, the day before he retired from the Royal Navy, a common practice at that time. He was elected Member of Parliament for Stirlingshire from 1874 to 1880. During this time he stayed at the family seat Duntreath Castle, Blanefield, Stirlingshire.

Sir William Edmonstone died at home, 11 Ainslie Place on the Moray Estate in Edinburgh on 18 February 1888, and was succeeded in the Edmonstone baronetcy by his only surviving son, Archibald Edmonstone. Lady Edmonstone died at Cramond House north-west of Edinburgh, on 11 August 1902.

== Family ==
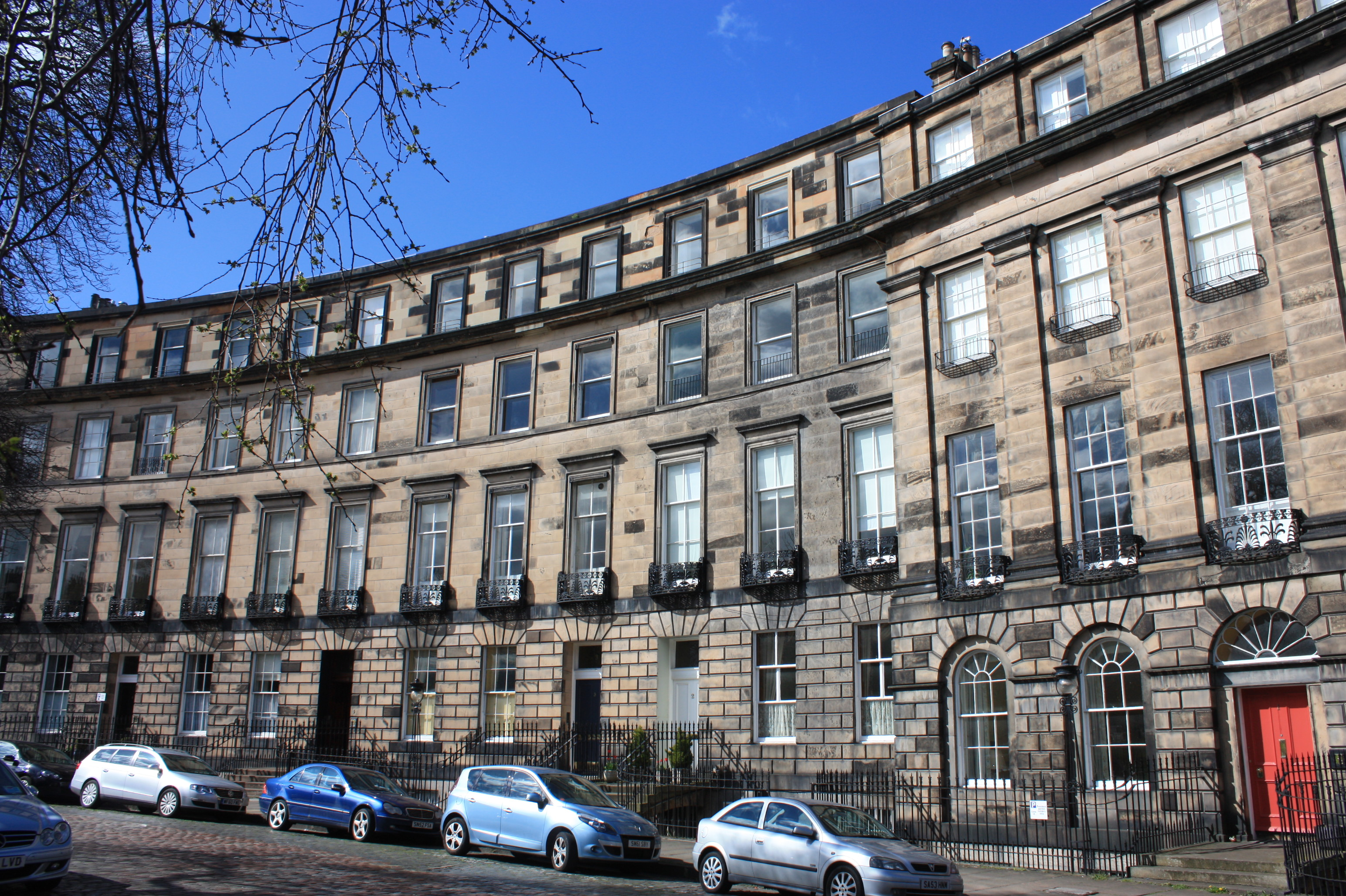
Ainslie Place, Edinburgh

Edmonstone married Mary Elizabeth Parsons (Newburn, Fife, 21 June 1823 – Edinburgh, Lothian, 11 August 1902), daughter of Lieutenant-Colonel Parsons, on 13 July 1841 at Zakynthos, Greece, who was resident on the island of Zante, at a time when the Ionian Islands were a British Protectorate. Mary Elizabeth and Sir William had eleven children in total, nine of whom survived into adulthood:

- Mary Emma Frances (1842–1847), died when she was five
- Archibald Edmonstone, died in infancy; their second son (see below) bore the same name.
- Jessie Edmondstone ( b.1848, m. 1884 Major Edward John Winnington-Ingram (d.1892). d. 10 June 1937)
- Louisa Ann Edmonstone (b. 1844 m.1872 Major General Henry Pipon CB, Governor of the Tower of London d. 1923)
- Charlotte Henrietta Edmonstone (d. 21 October 1931), married in 1866 John Francis Kitson.
- Frances Euphemia Edmonstone (b. 1850, m.1873 Alexander Robert Duncan of Parkhill, Angus, factor of Duntreath. d. 14 February 1921)
- Sophia Edmonstone ( b. 1852, m. 1880 James Edward Hope of Belmont, Midlothian. d. 19 February 1924)
- Susanna Emily Edmonstone ( b. 1855, m.1885 Jonathan Bucknill. d. 9 May 1886)
- Mary Clementina Edmondstone (b.1857 m 1874 Andrew Graham Murray, Viscount Dunedin. d. 2 December 1922)
- Sir Archibald Edmonstone of Duntreath, 5th Bt. (30 May 1867 – 1 April 1954)
- Alice Frederica Edmonstone (b.29 April 1868 m 1 June 1891 Lt Col George Keppel. d, 11 September 1947), a British socialite and one of the many mistresses of Edward VII of the United Kingdom; her great-granddaughter, Queen Camilla (née Shand, born 17 July 1947), was the mistress of and now second wife of Charles III.

== See also ==
- O'Byrne, William Richard (1849). "Edmonstone, William" . A Naval Biographical Dictionary . John Murray – via Wikisource.

== Notes ==
Parliament of the United Kingdom
Preceded by John Erskine	Member of Parliament for Stirlingshire; 1874–1880	Succeeded by Joseph Cheney Bolton
Baronetage of Great Britain
Preceded by Archibald Edmonstone	Baronet (of Duntreath); 1871–1888	Succeeded by Archibald Edmonstone
