= Charles Edmonstone =

Scottish politician (1764–1821)

Sir Charles Edmonstone Bt

Member of Parliament for Dunbartonshire
- In office 1806–1807
- Preceded by: Henry Glassford
- Succeeded by: Henry Glassford

Member of Parliament for Stirlingshire
- In office 1812–1821
- Preceded by: Charles Elphinstone Fleeming
- Succeeded by: Henry Home-Drummond

Personal details
- Born: 10 October 1764
- Died: 1 April 1821 (aged 56) Brighton, East Sussex, England

Sir Charles Edmonstone, 2nd Baronet (10 October 1764 – 1 April 1821), also 12th of Duntreath, was a Scottish politician.

Edmonstone was the third son of Sir Archibald Edmonstone, 1st Baronet. He was educated at Eton College and subsequently at Christ Church, Oxford. Having been called to the Bar, he was one of the six clerks in Chancery until the time of his father's death. In 1806, he was elected Member for Dunbartonshire, but he lost his seat in the general election of the following year. In 1812, he became member of parliament for Stirlingshire and held the seat until his death. A Tory like his father, he supported Lord Liverpool's government during the later part of the Napoleonic Wars.

Edmonstone first married Emma (1765-1797), daughter of Richard Wilbraham-Bootle of Rode Hall, on the 1 June 1794, by whom he had a son and a daughter. He married secondly on 5 December 1804 Louisa Hotham (9 October 1778 – 30 August 1840), daughter of Beaumont Hotham, 2nd Baron Hotham by whom he had four sons and two daughters. His second daughter, Louisa Henrietta, married John Kingston of Demerara in 1829.

He died at Brighton in 1821, apparently from a stroke, aged fifty eight, and was succeeded by his eldest son.

Parliament of the United Kingdom
| Preceded by Henry Glassford | Member of Parliament for Dunbartonshire; 1806–1807 | Succeeded by Henry Glassford |
| Preceded by Charles Elphinstone Fleeming | Member of Parliament for Stirlingshire; 1812–1821 | Succeeded by Henry Home-Drummond |
Baronetage of Great Britain
| Preceded by Archibald Edmonstone | Baronet (of Duntreath); 1807–1821 | Succeeded by Archibald Edmonstone |
