= Clan Edmonstone =

Scottish clan

- Motto: Virtus Auget Honorem (Virtue increases honour)

Profile
- Region: Lowlands
- Clan Edmonstone no longer has a chief, and is an armigerous clan
- Historic seat: Ednam, Duntreath
- Last Chief: Sir Archibald Bruce Charles Edmonstone, 17th of Duntreath (Chieftain of Edmonstones of Duntreath)
Clan branches
Edmonstone baronets
Allied clans
Stewart, Chisholm

Clan Edmonstone is a Scottish clan which does not currently have a chief; therefore, it is considered an armigerous clan. However, Sir Archibald Bruce Charles Edmonstone, 17th of Duntreath is considered the Chieftain for the Edmonstones of Duntreath. It has been speculated that much, if not all, of the senior line of the Edmonstone Clan has died off. Most Edmonstones (and variants of the surname) are believed to be descended from the Edmonstones of Duntreath.

== Origins ==
Eric Anundsson or Eymundsson (traditionally died 882) was a Swedish king who ruled during the 9th century. The Norse sagas describe him as successful in extending his realm over the Baltic Sea, but unsuccessful in his attempts of westward expansion.

Queen consort of Scotland, Saint Margaret of Scotland "Margaret of Wessex" "The Pearl of Scotland" (1045 - 116 Nov 1093), was born in exile in the Kingdom of Hungary. An English princess and a Scottish queen. Daughter of Edward the Exile. and granddaughter of Edmund Ironside, King of England.

After the Danish conquest of England in 1016, King Canute the Great had the infant son of Margaret; prince Edward of Scotland exiled to the continent. He was taken first to the court of the Swedish king, Olof Skötkonung his kinsman, and then to Kiev. As an adult, he travelled to Hungary, where in 1046 he supported the successful bid of King Andrew I for the Hungarian crown.

== The naming of the Shire of Edinburgh ==
Edmundus or Admundus, a person of note in the lands of reigned of King David I "Dauid mac Mail Choluim" who reigned 1124 - 24 May 1153. who is witness to the charter granted by that prince of the lands of Riddel, Waltero de Riddle, militi, got from the same king lands in Laudonia, now the shire of Edinburgh, which, according to humour and custom of men calling their lands after their own name at the time, he called Admonston or Edmonston, and transmitted it as a surname of heraldry appellation to his descendants.

Recorded in 1248 when Henricus de Edmundiston was witness to a charter. In 1359, in the reign of David II, an inquest before the Baillie of Musselburgh, declared that "Henricus de Edmundiston" had died and that "Johannes de Edmundiston" was his legitimate son and heir. It added that he held land of the Abbey of Dumfermline.

In 1352 John Edmonstone was appointed Coroner to the district of Lothian. In 1363 he joined the escort which accompanied David II to England to negotiate a truce. In 1367 and in 1369 passports were issued to Sir John Edmonstone and others, to travel to England on the King's behalf. The truce concluded at Edinburgh Castle, on 20 July 1369, was signed by John de Edmondiston and other nobles.

In 1372 Edmonstone he travelled to England with twelve men, and in 1373 was sent as part of an embassy to Rome granted £406-13s-4d for its expenses.

A charter of Robert II, dated 31 January 1374, authorized Sir John to travel as one of his ambassadors to France. They carried his instructions to intercede with Charles V to influence the Pope and Cardinals on behalf of Margaret Logie (widow of David II) in a suit to be brought before the papal court. Also they demanded reparation for attacks by Norman pirates on Scots traders. In 1381 a passport was issued to John de Edmonstone with 16 men and 16 horses, to make a pilgrimage to the Holy Land, while another for the following year permitted their return.

Sir John must have been a man of substance. He was granted a charter of the lands and barony of Boyne, in Banff, by David II in 1369, and some lands near Haddington, East Lothian by Robert II. Also he seems to have been a trader. It is recorded that Richard II of England allowed him to take 200 quarters of malt with his own vessels from a port on the coast of Lincolnshire to any port he pleases in Scotland.

The date of his death, and likewise the identity of his wife, are unknown, but records show that he was succeeded by his eldest son, also named John. Also according to Sir Archibald Edmonstone, 3rd Bt., the Archibald, who founded the family of Duntreath was probably his younger son. (See Edmonstone of Duntreath) John Edmonstone the younger was a courtier like his father. He married Isabel, or Isabella, daughter of Robert II and widow of James, 2nd Earl of Douglas and Mar. The estate of Edenham, or Ednam, in Roxburghshire, was granted to them by Robert 11 in 1390.

Sir John by this marriage had one son David. An "agreement by way of indenture", dated Perth, 7 April 1410, between Sir John Edmonstone of that ilk and Davy Edmonstone, his son and heir, with Patrick (Graham) Earl of Strathearn... of the lands and barony of Tillyallan (Tullyallan?) in Clackmannashire, proves their acquisition of this property.

Sir David, according to the Ednam pedigree, married Agnes, daughter of Robert Maitland of Thirlestane. He must have died in the prime of life for, in 1426, there is an inquest serving James Edmonstone as heir to this father.

In 1430 James Edmonstone, while still a boy, was amongst the sons of the nobility who were knighted by James I of Scotland at Holyroodhouse during the celebrations which followed the christening of the King's twin infant sons.

Sir James married firstly Isabella, daughter of Sir John Forester (ancestor of the Lords Forester of Corstorphine) by whom he had a son named John. Secondly he married Janet, daughter of Sir Alexander Napier (ancestor of the Lords Napier) by whom he had two daughters, Elizabeth and Margaret. The estates of Tillyallan, and of Boyne, in Banffshire where divided between them thus went out of the family.

Sir James was succeeded in the patrimonial estates of Edmonstone and Ednam by his son John. Subsequently the Edmonstones, styled of "that ilk" and "of Edenham" continued to use Edmonstone in Midlothian as their main residence until it was sold in 1624.

The family then moved to Edenham, or Ednam, in Roxburghshire, but this estate was sold by James Edmondstoune, last male heir of the senior line of the family, who died unmarried in 1772. It then changed hands several times until bought in 1827 by the 1st Earl of Dudley who took Ednam as his second title.

Sir James Edmondstoune, prior to selling Ednam, had purchased the estate of Cora on the Clyde. His sisters lived there until the death of the last in 1826, when she was reputedly over a hundred years old.

== Edmonstones of Duntreath ==
Duntreath is known to have been part of the Lennox by the mid 14th century. A charter, dated 9 February 1408, made by Donald Earl of Lennox, granted the lands of Duntreath to his brother Murdoch. The document states that Donaldus de Lefnax (Lennox) living at Catter, near Buchanan, confirmed Murdacho de Lefnax, his brother, in the land of "Dumgoyak cum reddyng una cum monte que vocatur Duntreth," and other lands of Blargin and of Dumfyn in the Lennox, for the heritable reddendo of a pair of white spurs yearly.

The word "monte" is taken to refer to what used to be known as "the Court Hill," now Park Hill, which rises on the east side of the Blane Valley opposite to Dumgoyak (sik). The top has been levelled, possibly for a fort, or a "mons placiti" or Moot Hill where courts of justice were held. The feudal privileges attached to Duntreath, indicate its importance.

The Edmonstones of Duntreath descend from Archibald, believed to have been the second son of the first Sir John Edmonstone, and therefore brother of the second John, who married Isabella, daughter of Robert II. Isabella's brother, also named Robert, became Robert III in 1390, but because of physical and mental debility, he was supplanted as ruler. His heir the Duke of Rothesay, and his brother, the Duke of Albany (the first two dukes in Scotland) were given control of the government.

In 1398 Queen Anabella, wife of Robert III, "instituted a great hastitudium (passage of arms) of twelve knights, of which the chief was David Duke of Rothesay, on the north of Edinburgh". Then in the following year the King accepted the challenge of Robert Morley, an English knight, that he would take a golden cup from his table unless prevented by a Scottish knight. Morley was defeated in this purpose by James Douglas of Strabnock. Mortified he rode south to Berwick, where he engaged in single combat on the same day with two Scottish knights, one Hugo Wallace and the other Archibald Edmonstone. The Englishman "got the worst of it" and Archibald Edmonstone may have received his knighthood in reward.

In 1406 King Robert III was a desperate man. His eldest son, David, Duke of Rothesay, had almost certainly been murdered with his brother Albany's connivance, and now his surviving son James, a boy of twelve years old, was all that stood between Albany and the throne. King Robert, to save James, secretly made arrangements for him to go to France. Leaving Rothesay Castle on Bute, supposedly for St Andrews, to continue his education at the College, he was taken instead to North Berwick, and rowed out to the Bass Rock. There he was joined by an escort of men his father could trust, amongst them Sir Archibald Edmonstone. At last, after a month, a merchant ship the Maryenknyght of Danzig, her master a Captain Bereholt, with a cargo of wool and hides, sailed down from Leith and took James and his retinue aboard. It seemed that they had escaped but, on 22 March, as she rounded Flamborough Head, the ship was captured by a band of pirates led by Hugh-atte-Fen. They sailed to London where a delighted Henry IV rewarded them with the ship's cargo. Prince James was sent to the Tower of London, but the English, unwilling to provide for Scottish prisoners, apparently released his escort.

Robert III died of shock on news of his son's capture, and Albany became Regent during the young King's captivity which lasted for eighteen years. In I4II Sir Archibald Edmonstone was one of two visitors who carried back letters to Albany and the Scottish Estates, begging them to negotiate his release. King James I, as he now was, returned to Scotland in 1424. His uncle Albany was now dead, but by an Act of Parliament of March 1425, he tried and executed Albany's heir, Murdoch Duke of Albany, together with all but one of his sons and his aged father-in-law, the Earl of Lennox. He then distributed their forfeited lands to his supporters, who included William, son of Sir Archibald Edmonstone.

An entry in the Chamberlain's Rolls in the Compota Ballivorum ad extra, under the head of the Earldom of Lennox, dated 1434, states that the Bailiff of the Crown "non onerat se de fermis terrarum de Erlelevin (Arlehaven), Drumfyn, (Dumfoin), et Duntreyne (Duntreyve, or Duntreath),...quia Rex William de Edmonstone de eisdem." (because the King has infeft William Edmonstone in them.)

Sir William Edmonstone, 1st of Duntreath, is styled of Culloden, lands near Inverness acquired from the Setons, a further indication of their relationship. In 1425 he married the Princess Mary, sister of James I and widow of the Earl of Angus, as her fourth husband. Although probably in her late thirties she had a son and a daughter. She is buried in Strathblane church.

On 20 July 1593 the Laird of Tullibardine hit William Edmondstone of Duntreath in the face with the hilt of his sword during a session of the Parliament in the Tolbooth of Edinburgh, in the presence of James VI.

== Duntreath ==
The estate of Duntreath lies on both sides of the Blane Valley some twelve miles to the north of the city of Glasgow. Today, in the 1990s, it comprises some 6000 acres. The original Barony of Duntreath consisted of Duntreath, with Craigbrock, Arlehaven Edmonstone and Auchentail, Dumgoiach (Dumgoyach), Blairgar, including Blairgarmore, Blairgar Begg, and Caldhame, Ballewan Edmonstone, or Middle Ballewan, and Cult Edmonstone, including Corriedale.

The places so named are as follows:

Arlehaven. The eastern part of this, known as Harlehaven Douglas, belonged from the 13th century to the Douglasses of Mains. In 1665 John Douglas of Mains granted a charter of Harlehaven to John Lyle, whose descendant, James Lyle, sold the eastern part to John Norwall (or Norval), "Weaver of Arlehaven" in 1782.

Four years later, in 1786, Lyle sold the western part, called West Arlehaven, or Meadowhead, to Sir Archibald Edmonstone, 1st Bt. Consequently, in 1868, Sir Archibald Edmonstone, 3rd Bt., bought East Arlehaven from the Norwalls, descendants of the weaver.

Ballewan. Mid Ballewan, or Meikle Ballewan, as it was once called, has remained largely unchanged.

The Spittal of Ballewan, a small acreage of land on the western side (now known as the High Haggles Field), is believed to have been granted by one of the Earls of Lennox to the Knights Templars. After their suppression it was held by the Knights Hospitallers, from whom it passed into secular hands.

It first appears in the writs of Duntreath when a charter of alienation of "The Temples Lands of the Hospital of Ballewan" was given by John Blair and others to James Edmonstone of Broich. James Edmonstone then sold them in 1696 to his nephew Archibald Edmonstone of Ballewan. The Archibald Edmonstone lairds of Spittal continued until 1833, when the then Archibald sold them to his distant cousin Archibald Edmonstone, 3rd Bt., of Duntreath (see p. 29).

Blairgar, Blairgarbegg, and Caldhame. Blairgarrbeg includes the hill of Dumgoyne.

Calhame, now a part of the Lettre sheep farm, stretches in a north-easterly direction to the top of the Earl's Seat, (traditionally the look out point of the Earls of Lennox) which, at 1896 feet, is the highest point on Duntreath. The hill of Dumfoyne stands upon its eastern march.

The Cult, which became known as Cult Edmonstone, was included in the grant by the Duchess of Albany to Sir William Edmonstone, 2nd of Duntreath, in 1445.

Sold to a family called Foyer in 1716, it was redeemed by Sir Charles Edmonstone, 2nd Bt., in 1820, sold again to the Foyers, and finally bought back from them by Sir Archibald Edmonstone, 3rd Bt., in 1825.

Corriedale, or Corrieacre. This was probably detached from the then adjoining farm of Cult Craigbarnet so that hay could be brought down from the hills which belonged to the Edmonstones to the north.

Dumgoyach. This also was included in the charter of the Duchess of Albany to William Edmonstone, 2nd of Duntreath in 1445. The land was at one time divided into small farms together with a mill and mill lands.

Two little farms called Capponhill and Shenanend lay to the east of the hill but the whole was converted into one farm during the nineteenth century.

Blairquhosh Edmonstone, included Roseyards, is an old holding of the Edmonstones, but not a part of the original Barony. Prior to 1394 it is known to have belonged to Adam Spittal who in that year sold it to his cousin Walter, laird of Buchanan. On 18 November 1488 Sir Archibald Edmonstone of Duntreath obtained the lands of Blairquhosh on the resignation of David Gilchriston, alias Dow of Blairquhosh, for security of £46.

Subsequently, in 1493, it was divided into three parts. The deed narrates "That the said Archibald Edmonstone and his heirs for ever shall have that east third part near the lands of Duntreath beginning from the burn of Croftelan, descending to the Water of the Blane by the ridge where the oak grows."

This oak, known as "The Meikle Tree", which stood by the roadside at Blairquhosh, was a favourite trysting place both for peaceful purposes and for the assembling of the Strathblane branch of the Clan Buchanan in times of war. It survived as a local landmark until the 1960s when, because it was dying and dangerous, it had to be cut down.

The other two thirds of Blairquhosh were somehow acquired by a family called Cunninghame before 1535.

"Blairquhosh Cunninghame" as the land was called, became the property of Lord Napier in 1638. It afterwards belonged to the Buchanans of Carbeth, with whom it remained until 1857 when it was bought by Sir Archibald Edmonstone, 3rd Bt., from John Buchanan of Carbeth. It comprises the farms of Blairquhosh Cunninghame, Burnfoot, and Drummickeich.

The Lettre consists of the Temple lands of the Lettre, and the lands called Machar, which, like the Spittal of Ballewan, are believed to have been granted to the Knights Templar by one of the early Earls of Lennox.

In 1461 the Commendator of the Torphichen Preceptory gave a charter of the lands to Thomas de Buchanane. In 1614 Thomas Buchanan of Carbeth sold them to Sir William Livingston of Kilsyth, who had a wadset, (security against a loan) of the estate of Duntreath. Then in 1630, when Sir Archibald Edmonstone, 7th of Duntreath, redeemed the loan the lands of the Lettre were included. The matter was completed by a charter from King Charles I, dated 28 June 1632, upon the resignation of William Livingston, erecting in favour of Archibald Edmonstone, the parts of the Barony of Duntreath which were redeemed and the lands of the Lettre (sic) into a free Barony for ever, as in the charter of King James II, 1452, to be held in free blench farm.

Previous to this, in 1599, the "ten pound lands of Lettre" had been bought by Archibald's father, William, 7th of Duntreath, from the Stirlings of Cadder. This land then became the farms of the Westerton, Easterton, Baptiston (or Baptist Town of Lettre) and Middletown. By the beginning of this century however, Middleton had ceased to be a farm and the house was rebuilt and enlarged by Sir Archibald Edmonstone, 5th Bt., for his sister Lady Dunedin.

In 1956, on the inheritance of the present laird, his mother Gwendolyn, the dowager Lady Edmonstone, moved into the "Lettre Cottage", as it then was called, where she lived until she died in 1989. Now, to avoid confusion with the former gardener's cottage which lies immediately to its rear, it has become the "Lettre House".

The Ibert, which according to the authors of "The Parish of Killearn" means "The Sacred Place", lies on the western perimeter of the estate. The same source tells us that William Graham, son of the 2nd Earl of Montrose, who became a Canon of Glasgow Cathedral and Rector of Killearn in 1549, had a charter from his father for the lands of Killearn, Ibert and Drumbeg dated 1560. His descendants, the Grahams of Killearn, were Lairds until 1752. The Ibert was then acquired by the Buchanans of Carbeth who sold it to Sir William Edmonstone c.1883.

The hill of the Ibert was then included in the Lettre sheep farm while the lower ground until recently, carried a herd of dairy cows.

The Ibert House is now the home of Philippa, Sir Archibald's eldest daughter, and her children Louise and Tom.

Duntreath Castle itself stands in the floor of the Blane Valley at a height of about 100 feet above sea-level. It was sited originally as a fortress in a place that was easy to defend. The conical wooded hill of Dumgoyach (composed of basalt volcanic rock which survived the erosion of the ice age) stands to the south west. On the opposite side of the valley, the summit of Park Hill has been artificially levelled.

Upon these heights at one time sentries must have kept watch and marksmen been posted to mow down approaching foes. Also the Park, due west of the castle, was once so prone to flooding that horses were likely to be bogged. Now thanks to extensive draining by the present laird and his father, this ground is sound enough to be used for equestrian events, but once it proved a deterrent to enemies aimed upon attack.

During the time of its existence Duntreath estate has changed in many ways. Houses have been built, woods planted and felled.

The Glasgow water supply from Loch Katrine to Mugdock reservoir, was opened by Queen Victoria in 1859, and "The Water Track", built to facilitate the maintenance of the underground pipes, runs along the eastern side of the Blane Valley. Closely watched by the Home Guard during the last world war, it is now much used by walkers as a link between Blanefield and Killearn.

The stretch of railway line, built by the Blane Valley Company between Lennoxtown and Killearn, was opened in 1867. Subsequently it was extended to Aberfoyle but was closed in 1951. Part of it now lies within "The West Highland Way", along which thousands of people walk each year.

== Cadet branches ==
The Edmonstones of Spittal or Broich. Sir Archibald Edmonstone, 3rd Bt., wrote in 1851 that the cadet branch of Spittal or Broich was the only one then remaining in the male line. Both sides of this family were descended from sons of Sir Archibald Edmonstone, 3rd of Duntreath (see p. 29). For several generations they were hereditary baillies on the Duntreath estate. The name "Craigbrock" may signify that they lived there, perhaps in an earlier house, while factoring Duntreath estate.

The Edmonstones of Cambus-Wallace. This branch of the family, according to Sir Archibald, may have ended with the death of Mr James Edmonstone of Newton, Doune, during the 19th century. Later, however, he mentions in a note that a direct branch of the Cambus-Wallace line was believed to be still living in Biggar, in a house called Cambus-Wallace.

This may have been Archibald Edmonstone, who was Captain of Edinburgh High Constables and Major of No 13 Queen's Company Edinburgh. He married Lucy, daughter of Richard Smith of Harescombe Gloucestershire. They had two sons, Francis Richard and Charles Gordon, and one daughter Catherine but later descendants, if any, have not so far been found. This information came from a Miss Lucine Edmonstone, who claimed to be descended from a William Edmonstone, born about 1600, but did not give further details, saying that documents had been lost.

The Shetland Family of Edmonston. Andrew Edmonston, a minister of the church, went to live in Shetland during the reign of Mary, Queen of Scots (1542–67). He would seem to have been connected with the senior line of the family. His descendants, their name spelt without the e, still live today in Unst, the most northerly island of Shetland.

The National Dictionary of Biography, which gives the spelling Edmondston, (pp396–8) describes the family as "one of the oldest in Shetland". Laurence Edmondston, a surgeon in Lerwick, was, for most of his long life, the only medical practitioner in the islands. His eldest son Arthur, M.D. (1776?-1841) who followed his profession, entered the army and served under Sir Ralph Abercromby in Egypt before returning to Lerwick to succeed to his father's practice. He died unmarried in 1841.

Laurence Edmondston M.D., the "udaller" (owner) of Unst (1795-1879) was the youngest brother of the above-mentioned Arthur.

Laurence's eldest son, Thomas Edmondston (1825-1846) born at Buness in Unst, became well known as a naturalist and was elected to the professorship of Botany and Natural History in Anderson's "University" at Glasgow in 1845. But before beginning his lectures he accepted the post of naturalist on board the Herald, ordered to the Pacific and Californian coast. The ship having anchored off the coast of Peru, a boat was sent ashore, but on re-embarking a rifle was accidentally discharged and the ball, passing through Edmondston's head, killed him instantaneously. He was only twenty one.

His sister, Jessie Margaret Edmondston Saxby (1842–1940), became a well-known author, folklorist and suffragette. On 16 December 1859 she married Henry Saxby, a London born ornithologist and doctor.

== Variant spellings ==
Edmondson, Edmonson, Edminson, Edmison, Edminston, Edmisten, Edmiston, Edmeston, Edmondon and many more.

The spelling of the name from Edmonstone to Edmiston may have been done intentionally by some family members in attempt to differentiate from the Sir James Edmonstone, 6th of Duntreath (1544-1618) who was accused of a handful of nefarious acts. James is also the Laird of Duntreath who mortgaged off Duntreath for some time before it was ultimately reacquired by his grandson, Archibald.

The spelling again changed for many American descendants due to scribe error in various census records over the years.

== Castles ==
Castles that have belonged to the Clan Edmonstone have included amongst many others:

- Boyne Castle, in Aberdeenshire. Granted by King David II of Scotland in 1369, passing by marriage to the Ogilvie family, who built the current castle.
- Ednam Castle, in Borders. Granted by King Robert II of Scotland in 1390, as a dowry for the marriage of John Edmonstone and Princess Isabella of Scotland.
- Culloden Castle, in Highland. Granted by King James II of Scotland in 1455 to William Edmonstone, it was sold to the Strachan family in the 16th century.
- Duntreath Castle, in Stirling. Lands granted by King Robert III of Scotland in 1435, as a dowry for the marriage of his grand daughter Princess Mary, daughter of Prince James of Scotland. The castle construction was started in circa 1452.

== Notes and references ==
http://edmonstone.com
