= Edmonstone baronets =

Title in the Baronetage of Great Britain

Escutcheon of the Edmonstone baronets of Duntreath

The Edmonstone Baronetcy, of Duntreath in the County of Stirling, is a title in the Baronetage of Great Britain. It was created 20 May 1774 for Archibald Edmonstone, 11th of Duntreath, Member of Parliament for Dunbartonshire and Ayr Burghs. He was succeeded by his third but eldest surviving son, the second Baronet. He represented Dunbartonshire and Stirlingshire in the House of Commons. On his death the title passed to his eldest son, the third Baronet. He was a writer and traveller. He died without surviving issue and was succeeded by his half-brother, the fourth Baronet. He was an admiral in the Royal Navy and Member of Parliament.

The family seat is Duntreath Castle, Blanefield, Stirlingshire; The castle was a gift from Robert III of Scotland. The 7th Baronet and his second wife Julie run the Castle as a venue for weddings and garden lectures.

The Edmonstones have ancient links to Kings of Scotland. They are descendants of Robert III of Scotland through his daughter Mary Stewart, Princess of Scotland, who married Sir William Edmondstone of Culloden and first of Duntreath (d. 1460), in 1425. She had a son with him, named Sir William Edmonstone of Duntreath. Sir William Edmonstone, 4th Baronet was the father of Alice Keppel (née Alice Frederica Edmonstone), the great-grandmother of Queen Camilla, wife of King Charles III. Elyssa Edmonstone, daughter of the 7th Baronet, married Archduke Sigismund of Austria, (titular) Grand Duke of Tuscany, in 1999.

== Edmonstone of Duntreath ==
See also Clan Edmonstone: Edmonstones of Duntreath.

- Sir William Edmondstone of Culloden and 1st of Duntreath (d. 1460)
- Sir William Edmonstone of Duntreath, 2nd of Duntreath, son
- Sir Archibald Edmonstone of Duntreath, 3rd of Duntreath
- Sir William Edmonstone of Duntreath, 4th of Duntreath, m. Sibylla Baillie
- Sir William Edmonstone of Duntreath, 5th of Duntreath, m. Margaret Campbell
- Sir James Edmonstone, 6th of Duntreath (1544–1618), m. Helen Stirling
- William Edmonstone, 7th of Duntreath, m. Isobel Haldane
- Archibald Edmonstone of Duntreath, 8th of Duntreath, m. Jean Hamilton
- Archibald Edmonstone of Duntreath, 9th of Duntreath (d. 1689), m. Anna Helena Scott
- Archibald Edmonstone of Duntreath, 10th of Duntreath (d. 1768), m2. Anne Campbell (1695–1785)
- Sir Archibald Edmonstone, 11th of Duntreath (1717–1807), son

== Edmonstone baronets, of Duntreath (1774) ==
- Sir Archibald Edmonstone, 1st Baronet (1717–1807)
- Sir Charles Edmonstone, 2nd Baronet (1764–1821)
- Sir Archibald Edmonstone, 3rd Baronet (1795–1871)
- Sir William Edmonstone, 4th Baronet (1810–1888)
- Sir Archibald Edmonstone, 5th Baronet (1867–1954)
- Sir Archibald Charles Edmonstone, 6th Baronet (1894–1954)
- Sir Archibald Bruce Charles Edmonstone, 7th Baronet (1934–2026)
- Sir Archibald Edward Charles Edmonstone, 8th Baronet (born 1961)

The heir presumptive is the present holder's younger brother Nicholas William Mark Edmonstone (born 1964).

== Notes ==
Baronetage of Great Britain
Preceded by Clayton baronets	Edmonstone baronets of Duntreath; 20 May 1774	Succeeded by Hanmer baronets
