= Stirlingshire (UK Parliament constituency) =

Parliamentary constituency in the United Kingdom, 1801–1918

- Former county constituency for the House of Commons
- Subdivision: Stirlingshire

1708–1918
- Seats: One
- Replaced by: Clackmannan & Eastern Stirlingshire; Stirling & Clackmannan Western

Stirlingshire was a Scottish county constituency of the House of Commons of the Parliament of Great Britain from 1708 and later of the Parliament of the United Kingdom from 1801 until 1918. It elected one Member of Parliament (MP) by the first past the post voting system.

== Creation ==
The British parliamentary constituency was created in 1708 following the Acts of Union, 1707 and replaced the former Parliament of Scotland shire constituency of Stirlingshire.

== History ==
The constituency elected one Member of Parliament (MP) by the first past the post system until the seat was abolished in 1918. For the 1918 general election, it was divided into Clackmannan and Eastern Stirlingshire and Stirling and Clackmannan Western.

== Members of Parliament ==
Election	Member	Party
1708	Henry Cunningham	
1710	Sir Hugh Paterson	
1715	Mungo Haldane	
1722	John Graham	
1727	Henry Cunningham	
1734	Sir James Campbell	
1741	Lord George Graham	
1747	Lord Erskine	
1747	James Campbell, later Livingstone	
1768	Sir Thomas Dundas	
1794	Robert Graham	
1796	Sir George Elphinstone	
1802	Charles Elphinstone Fleeming	
1812	Sir Charles Edmonstone	
1821	Henry Home-Drummond	Tory
1831	William Ramsay	Tory
1832	Charles Elphinstone Fleeming	Whig
1835	William Forbes	Conservative
1838	George Abercromby	Whig
1841	William Forbes	Conservative
1855	Peter Blackburn	Conservative
1865	John Erskine	Liberal
1874	Sir William Edmonstone	Conservative
1880	Joseph Cheney Bolton	Liberal
1892	William Jacks	Liberal
1895	James McKillop	Conservative
1906	Donald Mackenzie Smeaton	Liberal
1910	William Chapple	Liberal
1918	constituency abolished	

== Elections ==
Decades:	1840s; 1850s; 1860s; 1870s; 1880s; 1890s; 1900s; 1910s

=== Elections in the 1830s ===
General election 1830: Stirlingshire
Party	Candidate	Votes	%
Tory	Henry Home-Drummond	Unopposed	
Registered electors		132	
Tory hold			

General election 1831: Stirlingshire
Party	Candidate	Votes	%
Tory	William Ramsay	45	54.9
Whig	Charles Elphinstone Fleeming	37	45.1
Majority		8	9.8
Turnout		82	62.1
Registered electors		132	
Tory hold			

General election 1832: Stirlingshire
Party	Candidate	Votes	%	±%
Whig	Charles Elphinstone Fleeming	995	68.2	+23.1
Tory	William Forbes	465	31.8	−23.1
Majority		530	36.4	N/A
Turnout		1,460	81.7	+19.6
Registered electors		1,787		
Whig gain from Tory		Swing	+23.1	

General election 1835: Stirlingshire
Party	Candidate	Votes	%	±%
Conservative	William Forbes	779	50.7	+18.9
Whig	Charles Elphinstone Fleeming	759	49.3	−18.9
Majority		20	1.4	N/A
Turnout		1,538	79.0	−2.7
Registered electors		1,948		
Conservative gain from Whig		Swing	+18.9	

General election 1837: Stirlingshire
Party	Candidate	Votes	%	±%
Conservative	William Forbes	859	50.0	−0.7
Whig	George Abercromby	858	50.0	+0.7
Majority		1	0.0	−1.4
Turnout		1,717	81.6	+2.6
Registered electors		2,105		
Conservative hold		Swing	−0.7	

- After scrutiny, Forbes' election was declared void and Abercromby was declared elected

=== Elections in the 1840s ===
General election 1841: Stirlingshire
Party	Candidate	Votes	%	±%
Conservative	William Forbes	1,019	53.2	+3.2
Whig	Sir Michael Bruce, 7th Baronet	895	46.8	−3.2
Majority		124	6.4	+6.4
Turnout		1,914	82.4	+0.8
Registered electors		2,323		
Conservative hold		Swing	+3.2	

General election 1847: Stirlingshire
Party	Candidate	Votes	%	±%
Conservative	William Forbes	Unopposed		
Registered electors		2,398		
Conservative hold				

=== Elections in the 1850s ===
General election 1852: Stirlingshire
Party	Candidate	Votes	%	±%
Conservative	William Forbes	Unopposed		
Registered electors		2,431		
Conservative hold				

Forbes' death caused a by-election.

By-election, 5 March 1855: Stirlingshire
Party	Candidate	Votes	%	±%
Conservative	Peter Blackburn	Unopposed		
Conservative hold				

General election 1857: Stirlingshire
Party	Candidate	Votes	%	±%
Conservative	Peter Blackburn	Unopposed		
Registered electors		1,973		
Conservative hold				

Blackburn was appointed a Lord Commissioner of the Treasury, requiring a by-election.

By-election, 14 March 1859: Stirlingshire
Party	Candidate	Votes	%	±%
Conservative	Peter Blackburn	Unopposed		
Conservative hold				

General election 1859: Stirlingshire
Party	Candidate	Votes	%	±%
Conservative	Peter Blackburn	Unopposed		
Registered electors		1,900		
Conservative hold				

=== Elections in the 1860s ===
General election 1865: Stirlingshire
Party	Candidate	Votes	%	±%
Liberal	John Erskine	726	51.2	New
Conservative	Peter Blackburn	692	48.8	N/A
Majority		34	2.4	N/A
Turnout		1,418	73.0	N/A
Registered electors		1,943		
Liberal gain from Conservative		Swing	N/A	

General election 1868: Stirlingshire
Party	Candidate	Votes	%	±%
Liberal	John Erskine	Unopposed		
Registered electors		2,751		
Liberal hold				

=== Elections in the 1870s ===
General election 1874: Stirlingshire
Party	Candidate	Votes	%	±%
Conservative	William Edmonstone	1,171	51.0	New
Liberal	Sir William Cunningham Bruce, 9th Baronet	1,127	49.0	N/A
Majority		44	2.0	N/A
Turnout		2,298	81.0	N/A
Registered electors		2,837		
Conservative gain from Liberal		Swing	N/A	

=== Elections in the 1880s ===
General election 1880: Stirlingshire
Party	Candidate	Votes	%	±%
Liberal	Joseph Cheney Bolton	1,606	56.3	+7.3
Conservative	William Edmonstone	1,246	43.7	−7.3
Majority		360	12.6	N/A
Turnout		2,852	85.7	+4.7
Registered electors		3,328		
Liberal gain from Conservative		Swing	+7.3	

General election 1885: Stirlingshire
Party	Candidate	Votes	%	±%
Liberal	Joseph Cheney Bolton	6,454	62.1	+5.8
Conservative	Hugh Shaw-Stewart	3,938	37.9	−5.8
Majority		2,516	24.2	+11.6
Turnout		10,392	83.2	−2.5
Registered electors		12,486		
Liberal hold		Swing	+5.8	

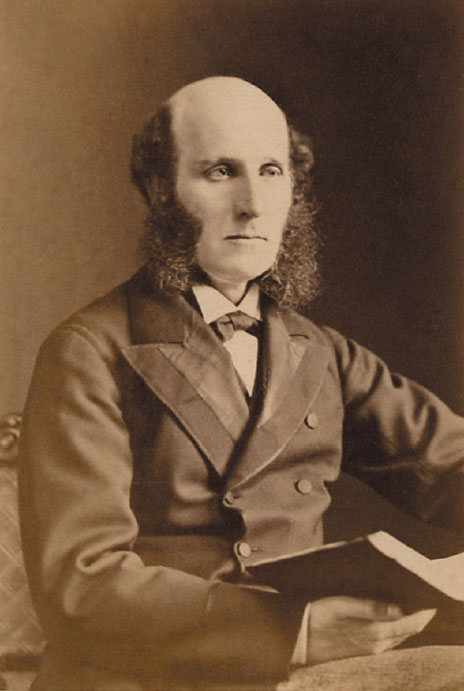
Noel

General election 1886: Stirlingshire
Party	Candidate	Votes	%	±%
Liberal	Joseph Cheney Bolton	5,067	53.7	−8.4
Liberal Unionist	Ernest Noel	4,360	46.3	+8.4
Majority		707	7.4	−16.8
Turnout		9,427	75.5	−7.7
Registered electors		12,486		
Liberal hold		Swing	-8.4	

=== Elections in the 1890s ===
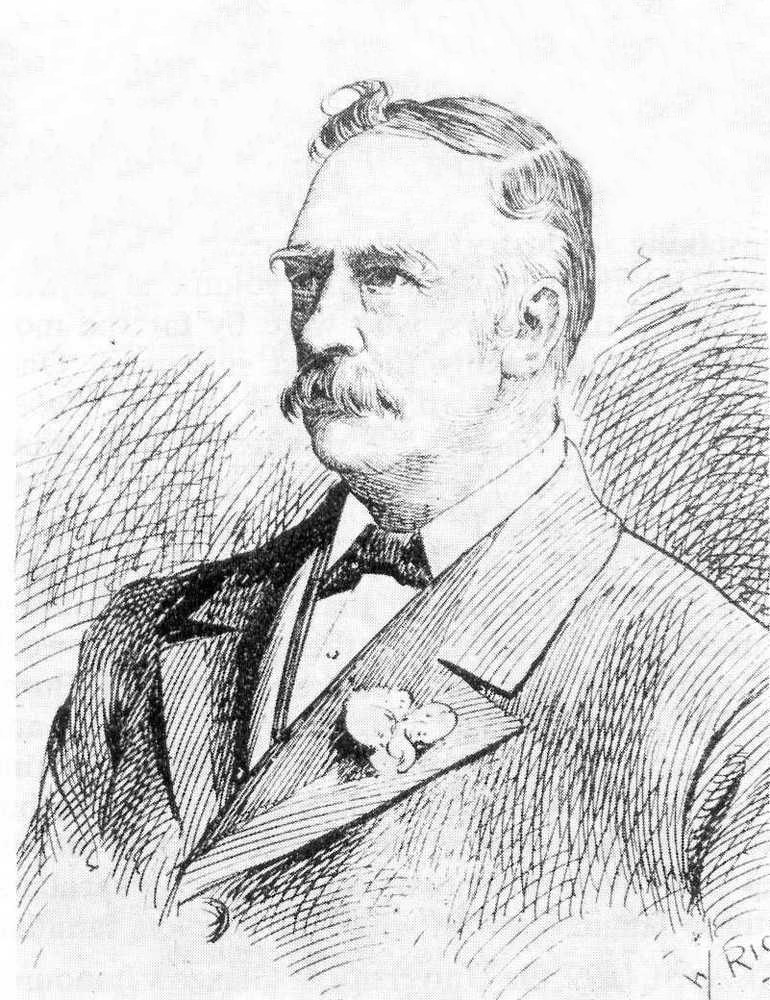
Jacks

General election 1892: Stirlingshire
Party	Candidate	Votes	%	±%
Liberal	William Jacks	5,296	50.4	−3.3
Liberal Unionist	Ernest Noel	4,550	43.3	−3.0
Scottish Trades Councils	Robert Chisholm Robertson	663	6.3	New
Majority		746	7.1	−0.3
Turnout		10,509	80.1	+4.6
Registered electors		13,128		
Liberal hold		Swing	-0.2	

General election 1895: Stirlingshire
Party	Candidate	Votes	%	±%
Conservative	James McKillop	5,916	51.9	+8.6
Liberal	William Jacks	5,489	48.1	−2.3
Majority		427	3.8	N/A
Turnout		11,405	79.6	−0.5
Registered electors		14,329		
Conservative gain from Liberal		Swing	+5.5	

=== Elections in the 1900s ===
Robertson

General election 1900: Stirlingshire
Party	Candidate	Votes	%	±%
Conservative	James McKillop	6,325	51.2	−0.7
Liberal	George Scott Robertson	6,023	48.8	+0.7
Majority		302	2.4	−1.4
Turnout		12,348	76.3	−3.3
Registered electors		16,179		
Conservative hold		Swing	-0.7	

General election 1906: Stirlingshire
Party	Candidate	Votes	%	±%
Liberal	Donald Mackenzie Smeaton	9,475	62.0	+13.2
Conservative	James Graham	5,806	38.0	−13.2
Majority		3,669	24.0	N/A
Turnout		15,281	80.7	+4.4
Registered electors		18,942		
Liberal gain from Conservative		Swing	+13.2	

=== Elections in the 1910s ===
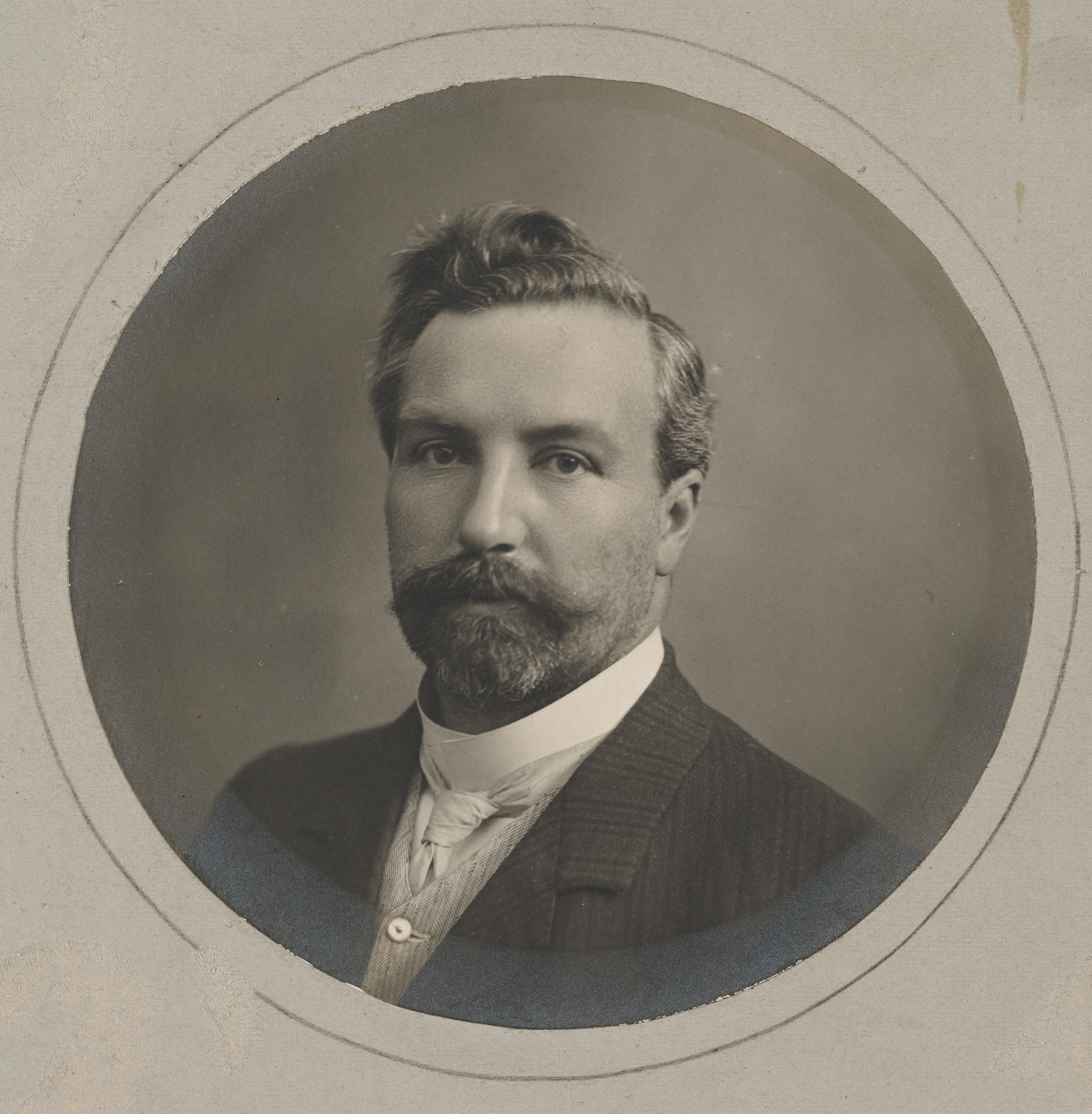
Chapple

General election January 1910: Stirlingshire
Party	Candidate	Votes	%	±%
Liberal	William Chapple	10,122	61.2	−0.8
Conservative	Robert Horne	6,417	38.8	+0.8
Majority		3,705	22.4	−1.6
Turnout		16,539	82.1	+1.4
Registered electors		20,144		
Liberal hold		Swing	-0.8	

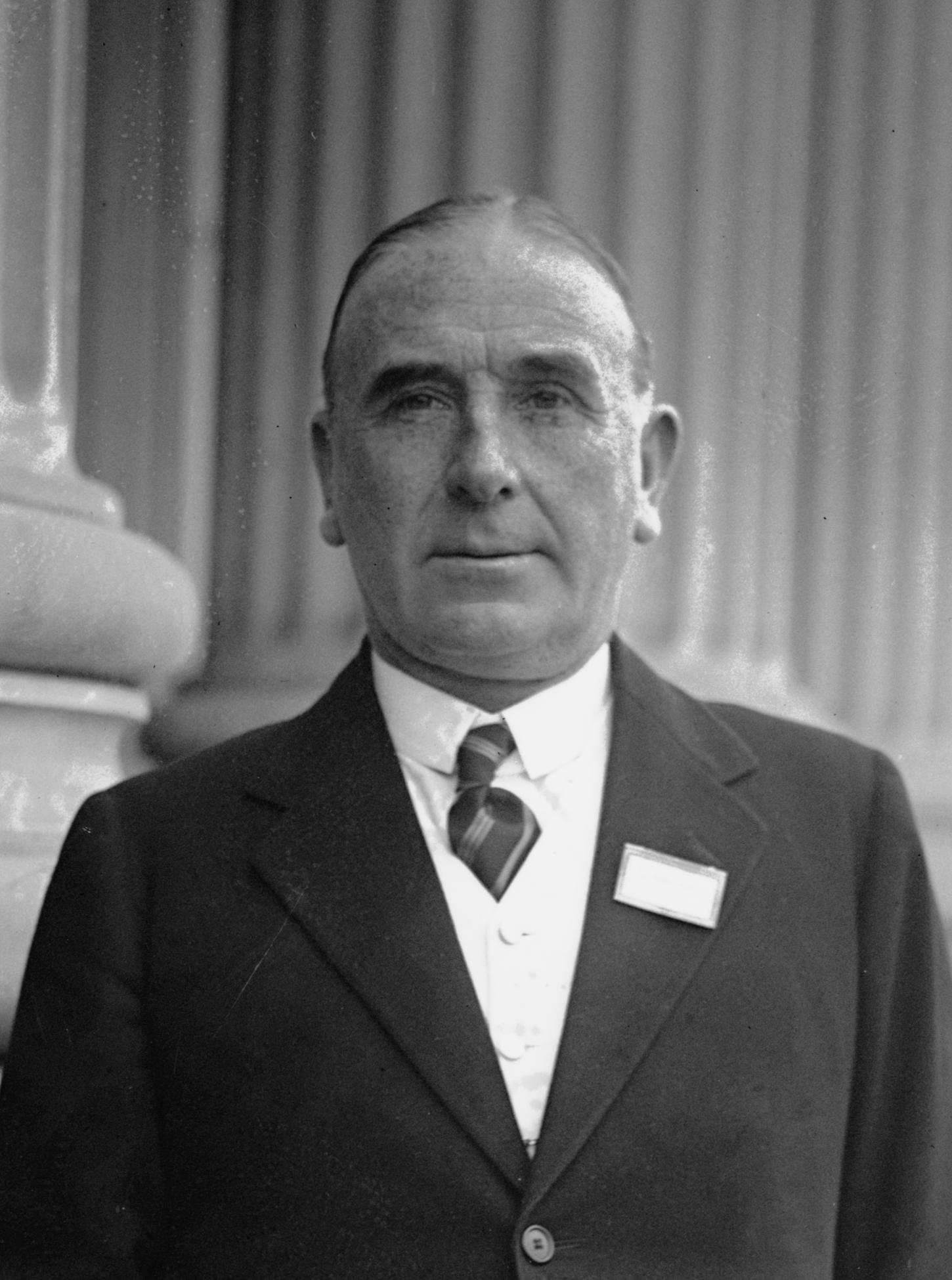
Horne

General election December 1910: Stirlingshire
Party	Candidate	Votes	%	±%
Liberal	William Chapple	9,183	58.6	−2.6
Conservative	Robert Horne	6,487	41.4	+2.6
Majority		2,696	17.2	−5.2
Turnout		15,670	77.2	−4.9
Registered electors		20,294		
Liberal hold		Swing	-2.6	

General Election 1914–15:

Another General Election was required to take place before the end of 1915. The political parties had been making preparations for an election to take place and by July 1914, the following candidates had been selected;

- Liberal: William Chapple
- Unionist: Andrew B. King

== Sources ==
- Leigh Rayment's Historical List of MPs – Constituencies beginning with "S" (part 5)
