= A84 road =

Road in Scotland

Coordinates: 56.2385°N 4.1960°W

A84

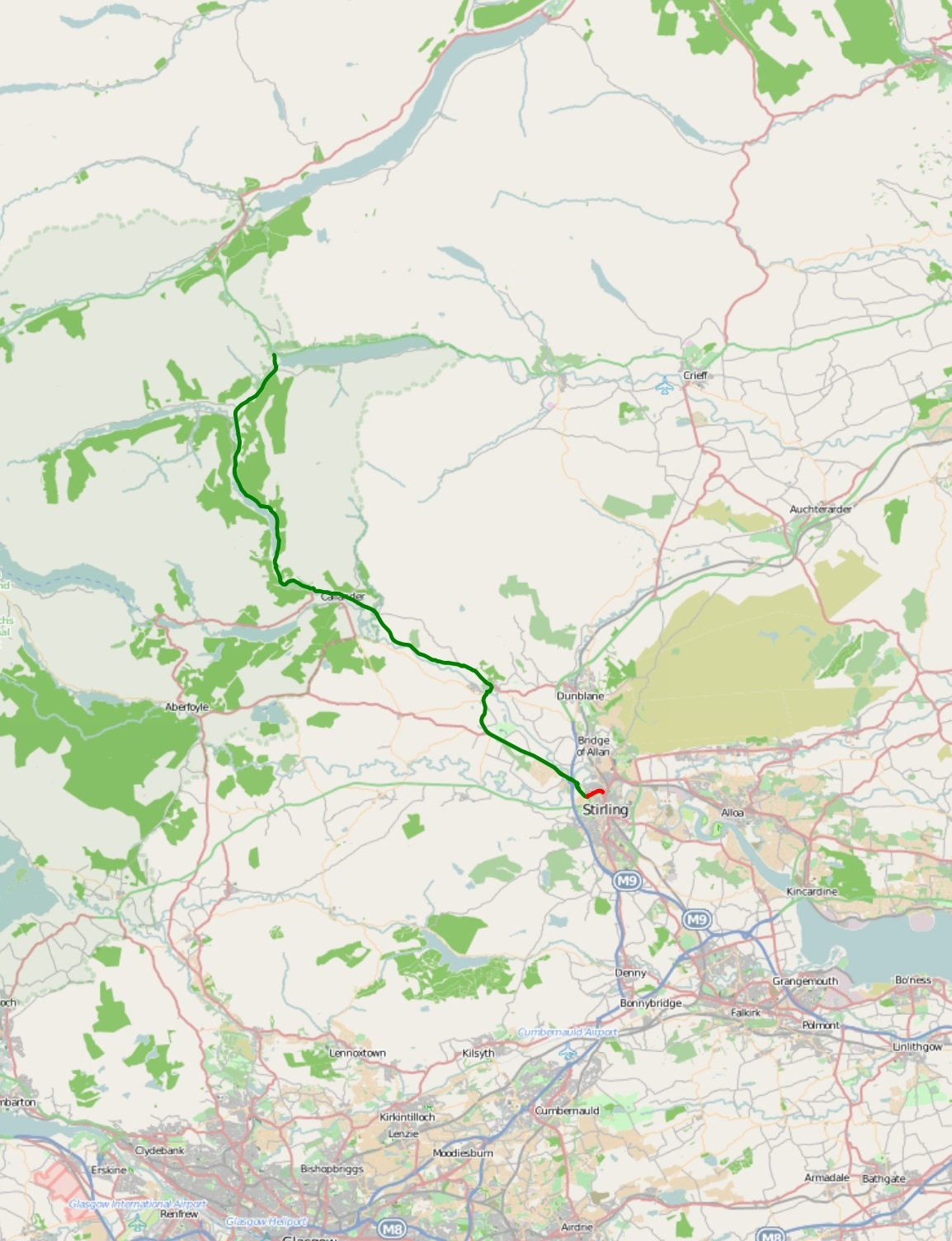
- Click map to enlarge

Route information
- Length: 29.2 mi (47.0 km)

Major junctions
- South end: A9 in Stirling
- M9 in St Ninians
- North end: A85 at Lochearnhead

Location
- Country: United Kingdom
- Constituent country: Scotland
- Council areas: Stirling
- Primary destinations: Stirling, Callander, Lochearnhead

Road network
- Roads in the United Kingdom; Motorways; A and B road zones
| ← A83 | → A85 |

The A84 is a major road in Scotland, United Kingdom. It links the city of Stirling with Lochearnhead, running for 29.2 miles (47.0 km).

== Road safety ==
The A84 between M9 Junction 10 and Lochearnhead has a poor road safety record, according to EuroRAP. In its June 2008 GB Tracking Results, the Road Safety Foundation reported that the 44 km single carriageway stretch featured 29 fatal and serious injury accidents between 2003 and 2005.

== Junction list ==
| Council area | Location | mi | km | Destinations | Notes |
|---|---|---|---|---|---|
| Stirling | Stirling | 0.0 | 0.0 | A9 / Union Street (B8052) / Lovers Walk to M9 / M80 / A91 / A907 – Edinburgh, Glasgow, Bannockburn, St Ninians, St Andrews, Alloa, Bridge of Allan, Causewayhead, Cornton, Springkerse, Forthside | Southern terminus |
| Stirling | Stirling | 0.7 | 1.1 | A811 west (Raploch Road) – Erskine Bridge | Eastern terminus of A811 |
| Stirling | St Ninians | 1.5– 1.9 | 2.4– 3.1 | M9 to M80 / A9 – Edinburgh, Glasgow, Perth | To M80 signed northbound only, To A9 southbound only; M9 junction 10 |
| Stirling | Kincardine | 5.8 | 9.3 | A873 west to A81 – Aberfoyle, Port of Menteith, Thornhill | Port of Menteith and Thornhill signed northbound only; eastern terminus of A873 |
| Stirling | Doune | 8.1 | 13.0 | A820 east (Balkerach Street) – Town centre, Dunblane | Western terminus of A820 |
| Stirling | Callander | 15.5 | 24.9 | A81 south (Bridge Street) / Cross Street – Glasgow | Northern terminus of A81 |
| Stirling | Callander | 16.7 | 26.9 | A821 south – Aberfoyle | Northern terminus of A821 |
| Stirling | Lochearnhead | 29.2 | 47.0 | A85 – Crianlarich, Perth, Crieff | Northern terminus |
1.000 mi = 1.609 km; 1.000 km = 0.621 mi
