= Blair Drummond =

Coordinates: 56.167°N 4.044°W

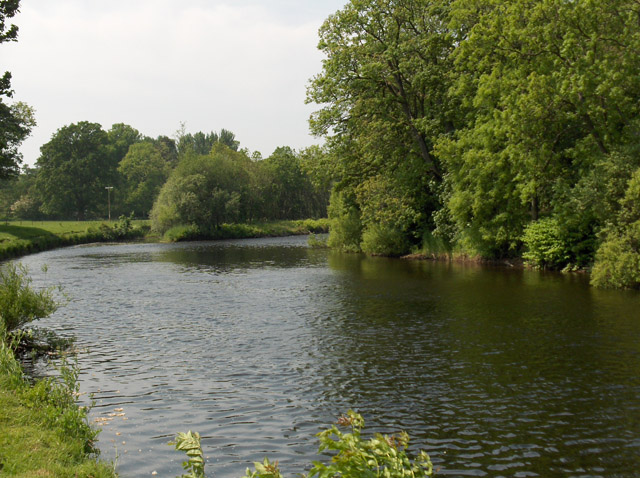
- The River Teith by Blair Drummond

- Location within the Stirling council area
- Civil parish: Kincardine
- Council area: Stirling
- Country: Scotland
- Sovereign state: United Kingdom
- Post town: Stirling
- Postcode district: FK9
- Dialling code: 01786
- Police: Scotland
- Fire: Scottish
- Ambulance: Scottish
- UK Parliament: Stirling
- Scottish Parliament: Stirling

Designations

Inventory of Gardens and Designed Landscapes in Scotland
- Official name: Blair Drummond
- Designated: 1 July 1987
- Reference no.: GDL00060

Blair Drummond is a small rural community 5 miles (8 kilometres) northwest of Stirling in the Stirling district of Scotland, predominantly located along the A84 road. Lying to the north of the River Forth, the community is within the registration county of Perthshire and the civil parish of Kincardine

== History ==
A former resident of Blairdrummond House was enlightenment thinker Lord Kames whose wife inherited the house in 1766. Lord Kames began the transformation of the carse area of Blair Drummond; turning it from an often water-laden moss into productive agricultural land, which brought him an income of almost £2000 per year.

Blair Drummond House was entirely rebuilt in 1868-72 by James Campbell Walker (under instruction from George Stirling Home Drummond FRSE) and again by James Bow Dunn after a fire in 1921-23 and is now a home for adults with learning disabilities run by the Camphill Movement.

In 1830 the remains of a Bronze Age wooden wagon wheel were discovered in Blair Drummond, dating from 1260-810 BC. This is the oldest preserved wheel from Scotland.

Four gold Iron Age torcs, known as the Stirling torcs, were found in Blair Drummond in 2009, dating from 300-100 BC. They are now held in the Museum of Scotland.

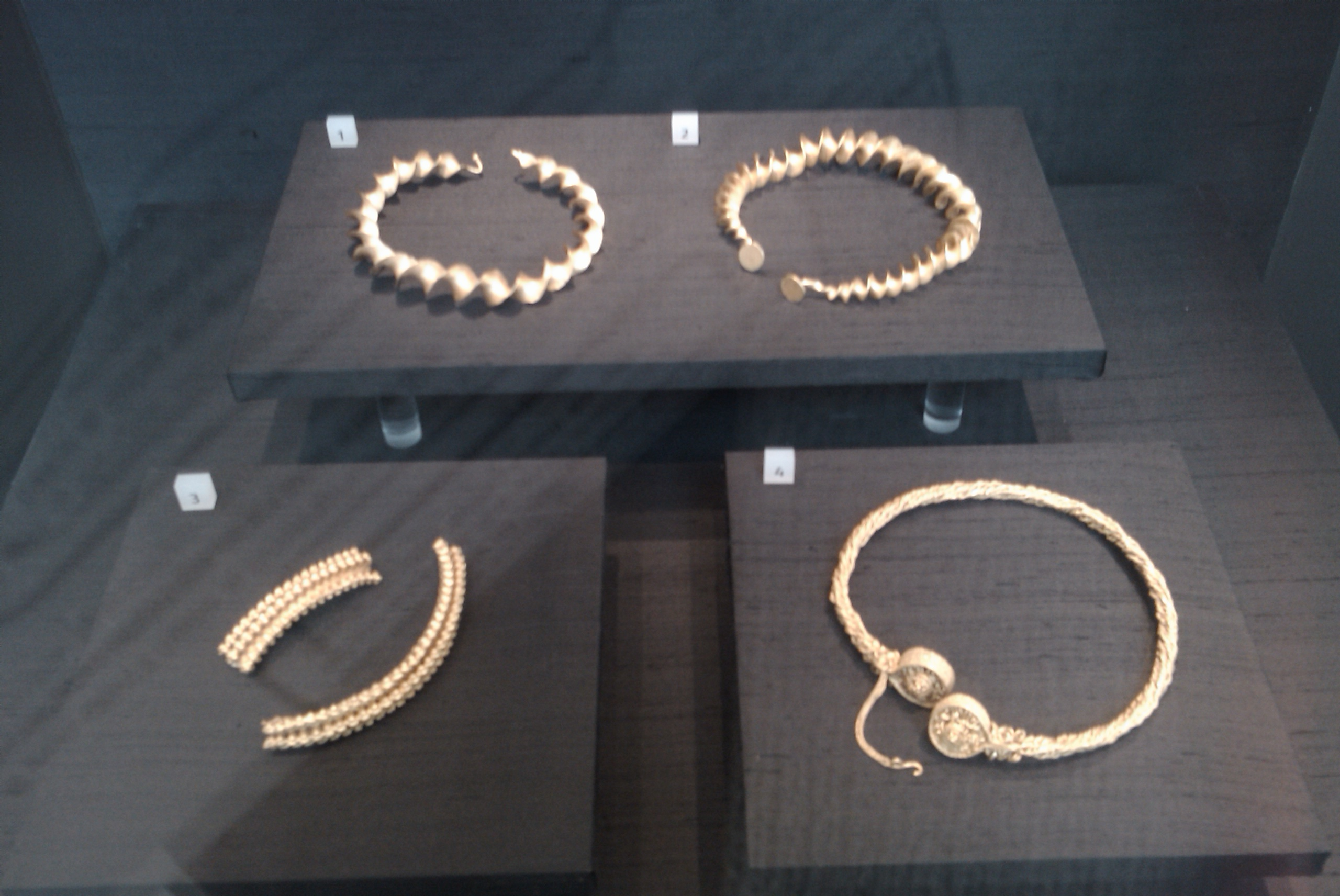
Gold Stirling torcs, 300-100 BC

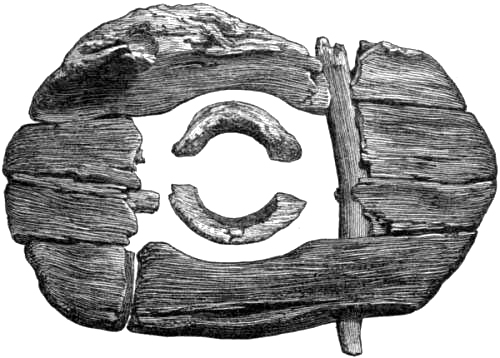
Wooden wheel remains, 1260-810 BC

== Facilities ==
Blair Drummond has a local authority primary school - Kincardine in Mentieth Primary School, a Church of Scotland church, and a community hall which was rebuilt in 2005. Blair Drummond is also the location of the Blair Drummond Safari Park, and a caravan park housed in the old walled garden of Blair Drummond House.

== The Community ==
Many of the residents of Blair Drummond are farmers, although others commute to Stirling, Edinburgh and Glasgow. Blair Drummond is in the Stirling council area, although in the past it was part of Perthshire. Other communities bordering Blair Drummond are Gargunnock, Thornhill, Deanston, Doune and Dunblane. A community council covers both Thornhill and Blair Drummond, and the 2001 census for the area covered by the Thornhill and Blairdrummond Community Council put the population for the areas at 1,109.

== Notable people from Blair Drummond ==
- Henry Home, Lord Kames - 18th century Scottish philosopher and writer
- Henry Home-Drummond
- George Stirling Home Drummond
- Nadejda Stancioff - Bulgarian diplomat and translator who lived in Blair Drummond after her marriage to Sir Alexander Kay Muir
- William Downie Stewart Sr - 19th century New Zealand politician
