= Ruskie =

Coordinates: 56.179°N 4.215°W

Ruskie: Scottish Gaelic: Ruisgidh
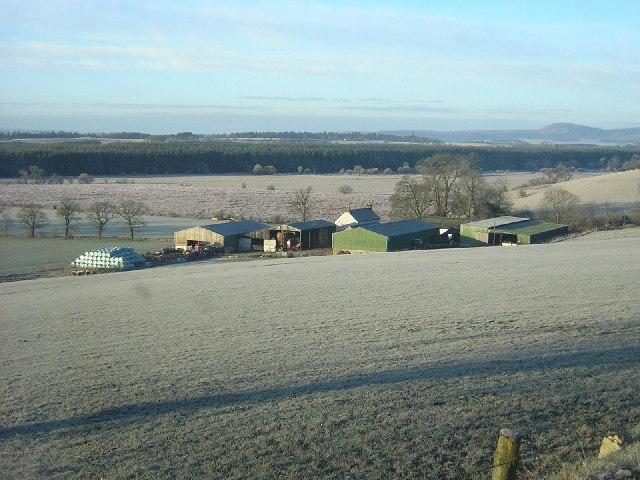
- Lower Tarr Farm, Ruskie

- Location within the Stirling council area
- OS grid reference: NN625006
- Civil parish: Port of Menteith
- Council area: Stirling
- Lieutenancy area: Stirling and Falkirk
- Country: Scotland
- Sovereign state: United Kingdom
- Post town: STIRLING
- Postcode district: FK8
- Dialling code: 01786
- Police: Scotland
- Fire: Scottish
- Ambulance: Scottish
- UK Parliament: Stirling and Strathallan
- Scottish Parliament: Stirling

Ruskie is a hamlet in Stirling, Scotland. It is located 4.5 kilometres (2 3/4 mi) from Thornhill. It lies within the FK postcode area.

== About the Demographic Information ==
The information on housing, people, culture, employment and education that is displayed about Ruskie, Stirling, Scotland, FK8 3LG is based on the last census performed in the UK in 2011. They are performed once every 10 years. Please note: census information may include figures for adjacent streets and postcodes. The figures are therefore representative of the local area, not a specific street address or row of houses. The census collection is designed so that each group of postcodes should contain at least 100 people (50 in Scotland). This is done to preserve the anonymity of the people in that area, as some postcodes cover a very small area, sometimes a single building. You can see the area covered by the census statistics by clicking "Show Census Area Covered" below the map above.

== Notable people ==
- John Menteith, a nobleman, was born in Ruskie.
