= Gabriela Cunninghame Graham =

English writer (1858–1906)

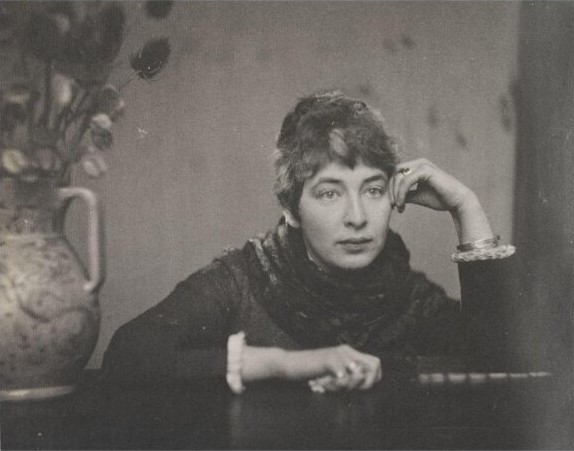
- Born: Caroline Horsfall; 22 January 1858; Masham, North Yorkshire, England
- Died: 8 September 1906 (aged 48); Hendaye, France
- Other name: Gabrielle Marie de la Balmondière
- Occupations: Writer, translator, lecturer, and socialist
- Notable work: Santa Teresa (1894)
- Spouse: R. B. Cunninghame Graham (married 1878)

Gabriela Cunninghame Graham (also known as Gabrielle Marie de la Balmondière, née Caroline Horsfall; 22 January 1858 – 8 September 1906) was an English writer, translator, lecturer, and socialist. She lived most of her life under the guise of being Chilean-born of Franco-Hispanic descent , a fabrication which was only exposed in 1986, long after her death.

== Life ==
Gabriela Cunninghame Graham was born Caroline (or Carrie) Stansfield Horsfall in Masham, North Yorkshire, England, in January 1858, the second of thirteen children born to Mary Elizabeth Stansfield and Henry Horsfall, a surgeon. She was known as a dynamic and imaginative child, who delighted her siblings with stories. As a teenager, she ran away twice. The first time was in 1874 with a male cousin, and being swiftly caught, Carrie was then kept locked in the spare room for 7 months, after which she was sent to her grandmother (also Caroline) who got her a post as a governess. In 1875, she ran away again to London to pursue a theatrical career. Though there is much speculation, nothing is known of about how she spent the next three years. However, it is probably during this time that she converted to Roman Catholicism.

According to Tschiffely, she met the Scottish writer and politician R. B. Cunninghame Graham in Paris, France after Graham had trouble controlling his horse. but all that is historically verifiable is that they married on 24 October 1878 at the Strand register office in London, Carrie using the name Gabrielle Marie de la Balmondière, and also giving a false age From that time on she was known as Gabrielle (though later in life she preferred the Spanish version Gabriela), claiming to be the Chilean-born daughter of a French father and a Spanish mother, who had been orphaned at age 12 and sent to a convent in France by an aunt. She spoke with an assumed accent on which many remarked. Early biographers of her husband described his meeting Gabriela while she was a schoolgirl in her late teens, although her real age at their marriage was 20.

A 2004 biography of R. B. Cunninghame Graham by his great-niece, Jean Cunninghame Graham, described the couple meeting in a park in Paris, and Gabriela revealing her true name and origins within the course of their first conversation. However, as her son, James Jauncey, points out, this too may well be a fabrication as there is no evidence of how or where they met. Nonetheless, her identity as Gabrielle Marie de la Balmondière was maintained throughout her life, and even long after her death.

Peregrina with Gabriela at Gartmore in 1898

Shortly after their marriage, the Cunninghame Grahams travelled to America, where she began to write. Her first story, which was published posthumously, was titled "The Wagon-Train", and told the tale of a journey on horseback from Texas to Mexico City. After America, the couple lived in Vigo Spain until the death of R. B. Cunninghame Graham's father in 1883. It was here that Gabriela acquired her loyal, if sulky, Galician maid, Peregrina Collazo, who remained with her until her death. On inheriting Gartmore, they strove to pay off inherited debts, first by selling Ardoch in 1887, then by selling the Gartmore feus and ultimately by selling Gartmore House, the family seat, in 1901, to Sir Charles Cayzer, 1st Baronet. This finally ensured their financial security. It was Gabriela who handled the negotiations to successfully repurchase Ardoch, which became their new Scottish seat. Gabriela maintained contact with her mother and some of her sisters, but asked that her new identity be respected and not revealed. She was particularly close to two of her siblings: her brother William (a high church Anglican clergyman) and her much younger sister, Grace, who some have speculated was actually Gabriela's illegitimate daughter

Gabriela Cunninghame Graham, who was an intimate friend of Emilia Pardo Bazán, wrote essays, poetic translations, and a substantial biography of Teresa of Avila, Santa Teresa: Her Life and Times, published in 1894. This was described by Herbert Faulkner West as "monumental and scholarly". In 1896, she contributed 4 stories to her husband's first anthology, Father Archangel of Scotland and Other Essays and the following year she contributed a story to The Yellow Book. She was also an accomplished amateur painter.

Gabriela, a keen gardener, became interested in the large variety of mosses in the locality of Gartmore, which she started collecting and cataloguing with the aid of a professor at Glasgow University. Her collection of mosses is now held in the Smith Art Gallery and Museum in Stirling.

Like her husband, Gabriela was an active socialist, and despite professing an aversion to politics, addressed meetings in England and Europe on subjects including the need for an eight-hour working day, and the ideals of socialism. Fascinated by mysticism, she also wrote and lectured on this.

== Declining Health ==
Gabriela's health was always fragile. In 1888, she was diagnosed with diabetes, a disease that ran in her family, which at that time was incurable and had no effective treatments.. This combined with her chain-smoking, a habit she had acquired in Texas, led to a serious decline in her health in her later years. She suffered frequent bouts of bronchitis and pleurisy, during which she would cough up blood, and even on one occasion pneumonia. Despite all this, she continued to smoke heavily and Jean Cunninghame Graham suggests that nicotine poisoning and perhaps cancer were involved in her decline.

== Death and burial ==
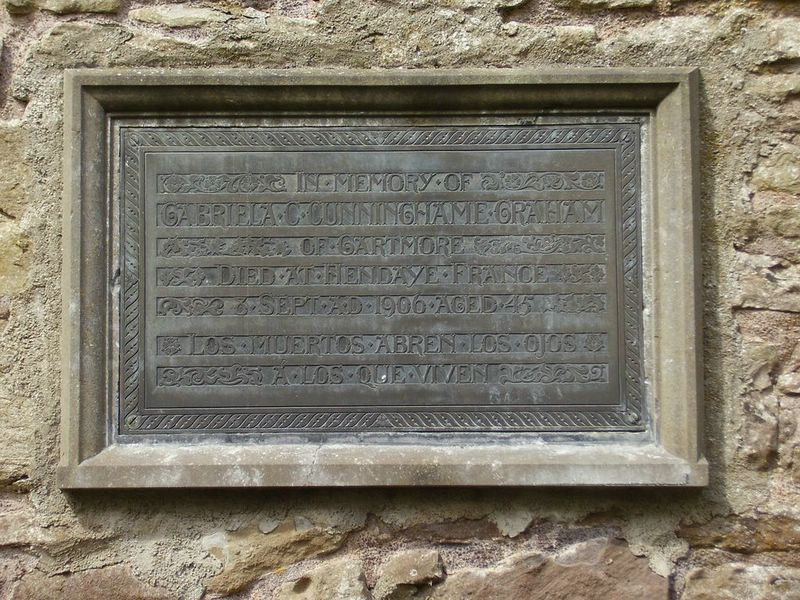
Memorial on Inchmahome, Lake of Menteith

Gabriela Cunninghame Graham died from dysentery on her way home from Spain on 8 September 1906 in Hendaye, France, her husband and her maid, Peregina, at her bedside. Her funeral, which was conducted by her brother, Rev. William Horsfall, took place on 19 September 1906 in the family mausoleum at the Port of Menteith and thence she was taken by boat to be laid to rest in the chancel of the ruined church of Inchmahome Priory, Scotland. Her gravestone only bears the initials GCCG (Gabriela Chideock Cunninghame Graham), Chid(eock) being her husband's pet name for her. However, there is also a bronze memorial on the wall above it (see image), which includes a quotation from the play Tragicomedia de Calisto y Melibea (La Celestina) by Fernando de Rojas: "Los muertos abren los ojos a los que viven" (the dead open the eyes of those who live). After her death, Cunninghame Graham collected his wife's poetry in a volume titled Rhymes from a World Unknown. Each year, on the anniversary of her death, he rowed to the island to smoke a cigarette over her grave, in fulfillment of a promise they had made to each other. He was later buried beside her.

Gabriela's death certificate recorded her as Gabrielle Marie de la Balmondière, aged 44, born in Chile to Joseph de la Balmondière and Carmen Suarez de Arecco. It was not until decades after her death that biographers learned Gabriela Cunninghame Graham's real lineage.
