= Arnprior, Stirling =

Coordinates: 56.126°N 04.235°W

Arnprior: Scottish Gaelic: Earrann a' Phriair
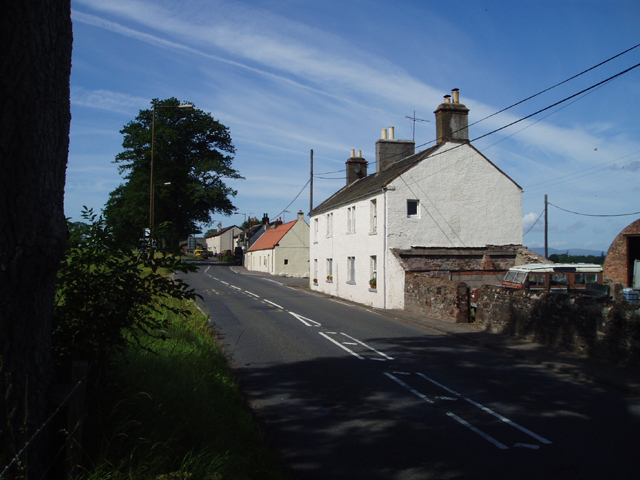
- The A811 in Arnprior

- Location within the Stirling council area
- OS grid reference: NS610948
- Civil parish: Kippen
- Council area: Stirling
- Country: Scotland
- Sovereign state: United Kingdom
- Post town: Stirling
- Postcode district: FK8
- Dialling code: 01786
- Police: Scotland
- Fire: Scottish
- Ambulance: Scottish
- UK Parliament: Stirling and Strathallan
- Scottish Parliament: Stirling

Arnprior is a hamlet in the Stirling council area of Scotland on the A811 about 12 miles west of Stirling and is one of the smallest community council districts in the region. The hamlet is next to the Flanders Moss National Nature Reserve and close to the east boundary of the Loch Lomond and Trossachs National Park, which includes the Lake of Menteith.

Until 1996, the hamlet had a primary school. Due to a lack of pupils, it was shut down along with Croftamie Primary School and Kinbuck Primary School. Part of the school has since been converted into a nursery. Pupils were transferred to Buchlyvie Primary School.

== Etymology ==
The name is from the Gaelic 'earrann' meaning a division of land. Walter Comyn, the Earl of Menteith, founded Inchmahome Priory in 1238 and it is thought the name of the hamlet could date from then. There are other ‘Arns’ in the area, some of which indicate size (e.g. Arnmore) and others indicate previous owners (e.g. Arnfinlay).

The town of Arnprior, Ontario, Canada, was named after the hamlet, the ancestral home of its founder, Archibald McNab.

== Commerce ==
The notable commerce of the hamlet is provided by Arnprior Farm, which in 2015, as part of a diversification programme, established what it claims to be "Scotland's original and best pumpkin patch".

There is also an agricultural mechanics.
