= Graeme Whitelaw =

British Conservative Party politician

Member of Parliament for North West Lanarkshire
- In office 4 July 1892 – 13 July 1895
- Preceded by: Robert Cunninghame-Graham
- Succeeded by: John Goundry Holburn

Personal details
- Born: Graeme Alexander Lockhart Whitelaw; 1863
- Died: 23 July 1928 (aged 64–65)
- Party: Conservative

Graeme Alexander Lockhart Whitelaw (1863 – 23 July 1928) was a British Conservative Party politician from Scotland who represented North West Lanarkshire in the House of Commons from 1892 to 1895.

He was the second son of Alexander Whitelaw and an elder brother of William Whitelaw, grandfather of William Whitelaw, 1st Viscount Whitelaw. Like his brother, he was educated at Harrow and Trinity College, Cambridge.

== Electoral history ==
General election 1892: North West Lanarkshire
| Party | Candidate | Votes | % | ±% |
|---|---|---|---|---|
| Conservative | Graeme Alexander Whitelaw | 4,770 | 50.4 | +2.5 |
| Liberal | James C.R. Reade | 4,689 | 49.6 | −2.5 |
| Majority | | 81 | 0.8 | N/A |
| Turnout | | 9,459 | 82.9 | +0.5 |
| Registered electors | | 11,408 | | |
| Conservative gain from Lib-Lab | | Swing | +2.5 | |

General election 1895: North West Lanarkshire
| Party | Candidate | Votes | % | ±% |
|---|---|---|---|---|
| Liberal | John Goundry Holburn | 5,244 | 50.5 | +0.9 |
| Conservative | Graeme Alexander Whitelaw | 5,147 | 49.5 | −0.9 |
| Majority | | 97 | 1.0 | N/A |
| Turnout | | 10,391 | 84.0 | +1.1 |
| Registered electors | | 12,371 | | |
| Liberal gain from Conservative | | Swing | +0.9 | |

By-election 21 Feb 1899: North West Lanarkshire
| Party | Candidate | Votes | % | ±% |
|---|---|---|---|---|
| Liberal | Charles Mackinnon Douglas | 5,723 | 51.6 | +1.1 |
| Conservative | Graeme Alexander Whitelaw | 5,364 | 48.4 | −1.1 |
| Majority | | 359 | 3.2 | +2.2 |
| Turnout | | 11,087 | 83.1 | −0.9 |
| Registered electors | | 13,337 | | |
| Liberal hold | | Swing | +1.1 | |
