= North West Lanarkshire =

Parliamentary constituency in the United Kingdom, 1885–1918

Coordinates: 55.828°N 4.060°W

- Former county constituency for the House of Commons
- Subdivision: county of Lanark

1885–1918
- Seats: One
- Created from: North Lanarkshire
- Replaced by: Glasgow Shettleston, Glasgow Springburn and North Lanarkshire

North West Lanarkshire was a county constituency of the House of Commons of the Parliament of the United Kingdom (Westminster) from 1885 to 1918. It elected one Member of Parliament (MP) by the first past the post voting system.

== Boundaries ==
The name relates the constituency to the county of Lanark. The Redistribution of Seats Act 1885 provided that the North-West division was to consist of "so much of the Parish of Barony as lies beyond the present boundary of the municipal burgh of Glasgow and to the east of the main line of railway before mentioned (main line of railway between Glasgow and Edinburgh of the North British Railway Company (being the old Edinburgh and Glasgow Railway), and the parishes of Cadder and Old Monkland".

== Members of Parliament ==
Election	Member	Party
1885	John Baird	Conservative
1886	Cunninghame Graham	Liberal
1892	Graeme Whitelaw	Conservative
1895	John Goundry Holburn	Liberal
1899 b-e	Charles Mackinnon Douglas	Liberal
1906	William Mitchell-Thompson	Conservative
Jan. 1910	William Pringle	Liberal
1918	constituency abolished	

== Elections ==
=== Elections in the 1880s ===
General election 1885: North West Lanarkshire
Party	Candidate	Votes	%	±%
Conservative	John Baird	4,545	56.9	
Lib-Lab	Cunninghame Graham	3,442	43.1	
Majority		1,103	13.8	
Turnout		7,987	85.2	
Registered electors		9,373		
Conservative win (new seat)				

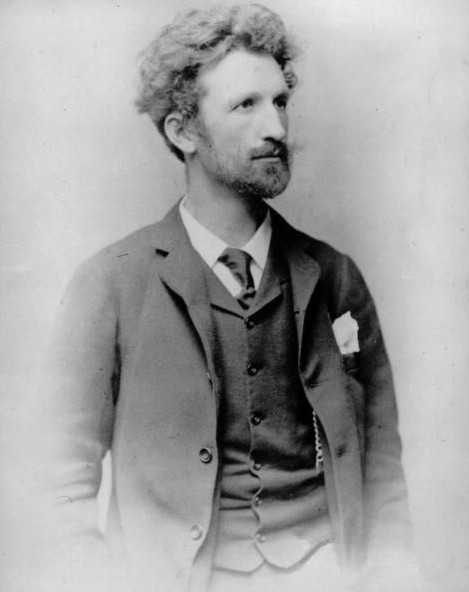
Cunninghame Graham

General election 1886: North West Lanarkshire
Party	Candidate	Votes	%	±%
Lib-Lab	Cunninghame Graham	4,030	52.1	+9.0
Conservative	John Baird	3,698	47.9	−9.0
Majority		332	4.2	N/A
Turnout		7,728	82.4	−2.8
Registered electors		9,373		
Lib-Lab gain from Conservative		Swing	+9.0	

=== Elections in the 1890s ===
General election 1892: North West Lanarkshire
Party	Candidate	Votes	%	±%
Conservative	Graeme Whitelaw	4,770	50.4	+2.5
Liberal	James C.R. Reade	4,689	49.6	−2.5
Majority		81	0.8	N/A
Turnout		9,459	82.9	+0.5
Registered electors		11,408		
Conservative gain from Lib-Lab		Swing	+2.5	

General election 1895: North West Lanarkshire
Party	Candidate	Votes	%	±%
Liberal	John Goundry Holburn	5,244	50.5	+0.9
Conservative	Graeme Whitelaw	5,147	49.5	−0.9
Majority		97	1.0	N/A
Turnout		10,391	84.0	+1.1
Registered electors		12,371		
Liberal gain from Conservative		Swing	+0.9	

Holburn's death caused a by-election.

By-election 21 Feb 1899: North West Lanarkshire
Party	Candidate	Votes	%	±%
Liberal	Charles Mackinnon Douglas	5,723	51.6	+1.1
Conservative	Graeme Whitelaw	5,364	48.4	−1.1
Majority		359	3.2	+2.2
Turnout		11,087	83.1	−0.9
Registered electors		13,337		
Liberal hold		Swing	+1.1	

=== Elections in the 1900s ===
General election 1900: North West Lanarkshire
Party	Candidate	Votes	%	±%
Liberal	Charles Mackinnon Douglas	5,505	51.4	+0.9
Conservative	Lewis Edmunds	5,214	48.6	−0.9
Majority		291	2.8	+1.8
Turnout		10,719	79.0	−5.0
Registered electors		13,568		
Liberal hold		Swing	+0.9	

General election 1906: North West Lanarkshire
Party	Candidate	Votes	%	±%
Conservative	William Mitchell-Thomson	5,588	40.5	−8.1
Liberal	Charles Mackinnon Douglas	4,913	35.6	−15.8
Scottish Workers	Joseph Sullivan	3,291	23.9	New
Majority		675	4.9	N/A
Turnout		13,792	82.0	+3.0
Registered electors		16,814		
Conservative gain from Liberal		Swing	+3.9	

=== Elections in the 1910s ===
General election January 1910: North West Lanarkshire
Party	Candidate	Votes	%	±%
Liberal	William Pringle	8,422	47.7	+12.1
Conservative	William Mitchell-Thomson	7,528	42.6	+2.1
Labour	Robert Small	1,718	9.7	−14.2
Majority		894	5.1	N/A
Turnout		17,668	87.1	+5.1
Registered electors		20,274		
Liberal gain from Conservative		Swing	+5.0	

General election December 1910: North West Lanarkshire
Party	Candidate	Votes	%	±%
Liberal	William Pringle	9,315	52.3	+4.6
Liberal Unionist	Arthur Stanley Pringle	8,486	47.7	+5.1
Majority		829	4.6	−0.5
Turnout		17,801	83.2	−3.9
Registered electors		21,398		
Liberal hold		Swing	−0.3	

General Election 1914–15:

Another General Election was required to take place before the end of 1915. The political parties had been making preparations for an election to take place and by July 1914, the following candidates had been selected;

- Liberal: William Pringle
- Unionist:
