= John Baird (North West Lanarkshire MP) =

John Baird, DL, JP (17 February 1852 – 8 July 1900), was a Scottish Unionist politician.

== Biography ==
Baird was the son of John Baird, 1st of Ury, and his wife Margaret Findlay, and younger brother of Sir Alexander Baird, 1st Baronet, Lord Lieutenant of Kincardineshire from 1889 to 1918.

He was educated at Harrow School and Christ Church, Oxford.

He was deputy lieutenant and justice of the peace for Inverness-shire.

At the 1885 general election Baird was elected as the member of parliament (MP) for North West Lanarkshire. He lost the seat at the 1886 general election to the socialist Robert Cunninghame-Graham, who stood as a Liberal-Labour candidate and became Britain's first socialist MP.

Baird had residences at Knoydart, the Isle of Ornsay and Lochwood, Lanarkshire. He died at the age of 48.

Baird married Constance Amelia Harford, daughter of John Battersby Harford and wife Mary Charlotte de Bunsen, on 23 April 1878 and had two daughters and two sons.

Parliament of the United Kingdom
New constituency (see North Lanarkshire)	Member of Parliament for North West Lanarkshire; 1885–1886	Succeeded by Robert Cunninghame-Graham
