= Buchlyvie United F.C. =

Association football club in Scotland

Buchlyvie United
- Full name: Buchlyvie United Football Club
- Nickname: The Barons of Buchlyvie
- Founded: 1910
- Ground: Buchlyvie Park
- Capacity: 1,000
- Coordinates: 56°6′54″N 4°17′50″W
- League: Forth and Endrick Football League
- 2016: 4th
Home colours

Buchlyvie United Football Club is a Scottish association football club currently playing in the Forth and Endrick Football League. The club was formed in 1910 and won the Forth and Endrick Football League once in their history, in 1982.

== History ==
The village of Buchlyvie has had a football team in various guises for over 100 years, Buchlyvie was actually one of the founder members of the local Forth & Endrick league in 1910. The club had its most successful decade in the 1980s winning their only league trophy in 1982, the Telfer Cup in 1984, and most recently the Cameron Cup in 2018.

== Competitions ==
The club competes in a number of competitions, including:

- Forth and Endrick League
- Cameron Cup
- MacGregor Ferguson Cup
- The Telfer Trophy
- Margaret White Trophy

== Honours ==
- Forth and Endrick League: 1982
- The Telfer Trophy: 1984
- Cameron Cup: 1957, 2018
- Wybar Cup: 2014
