= George Stirling Home Drummond =

Scottish landowner and antiquarian (1813–1876)

George Stirling Home Drummond of Blair Drummond and Ardoch FRSE FSAS FGS (1813–1876) was a Scottish landowner and antiquarian.

== Life ==
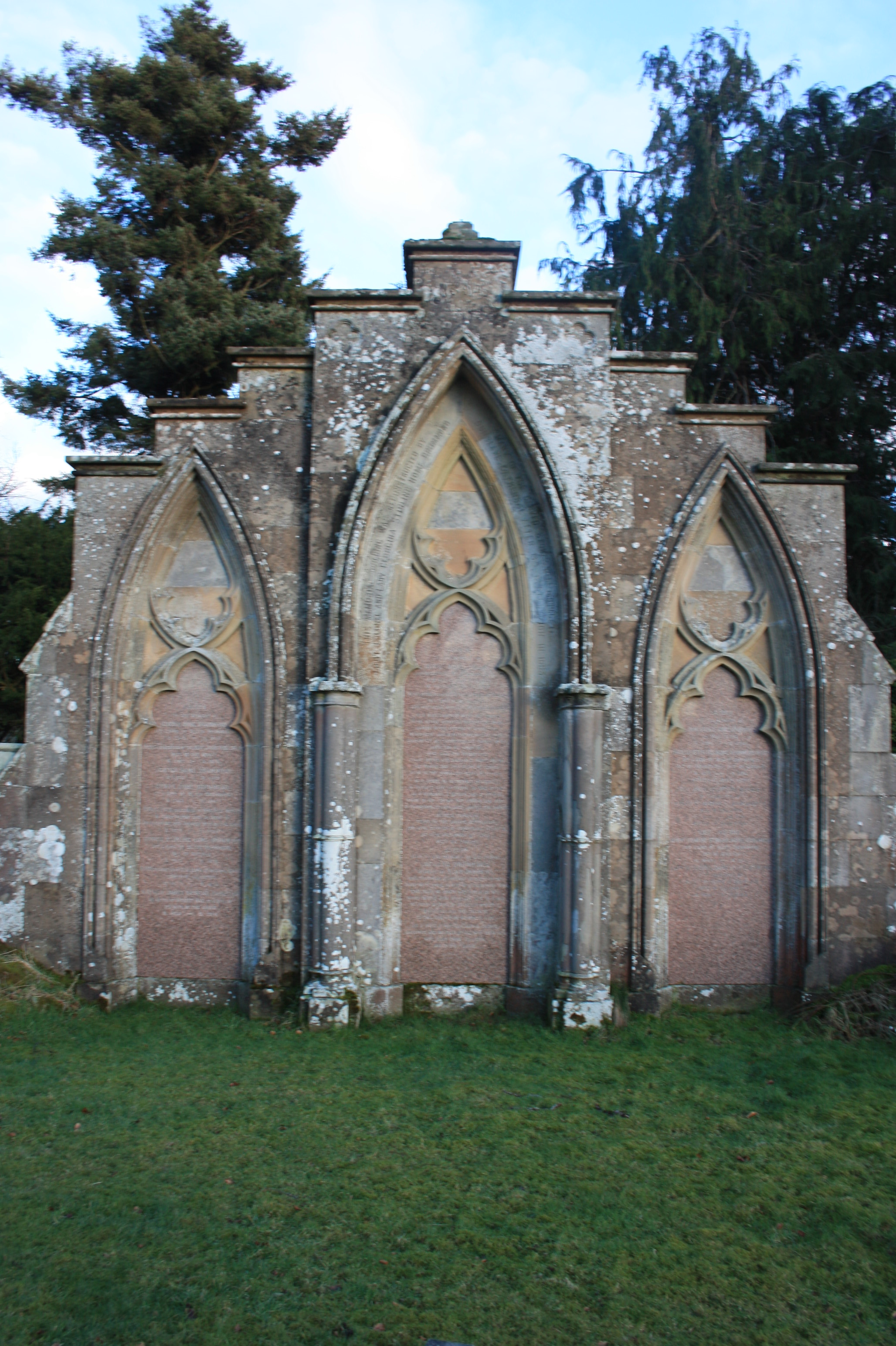
The Home-Drummond grave, Kincardine-in-Menteith

He was born at 110 Princes Street in Edinburgh on 1 March 1813 the son of Henry Home Drummond and his wife Christian Moray of Abercairney (1779–1864). The family's Edinburgh town-house faces Edinburgh Castle. He would largely have been raised at the family's country seat of Blair Drummond. He was educated at Oxford University.

He was elected a Fellow of the Society of Antiquaries of Scotland in 1851. He was elected a Fellow of the Royal Society of Edinburgh in 1867 his proposer being Sir James Edward Alexander.

In 1868 he commissioned plans for expansion of old Blair Drummond House, but instead was persuaded to pursue a more radical scheme, demolishing the ancient house and replacing it with a huge new sprawling mansion in the Scots Baronial fashion, as was the fashion of the time. The plans were drawn up by the architect James Campbell Walker. The new house was completed in 1872, and the old mansion then was demolished. His secondary estate of Ardoch in Perthshire contained a substantial Georgian villa of around 1790. This fell derelict by the 1980s and has now been demolished.

He died at his London address of St George's Place, Hyde Park Corner in London on 3 June 1876. He is buried in the family grave at Kincardine-in-Menteith just west of Blair Drummond.

The lectern of the Church of the Holy Rude in Stirling is dedicated to his memory.

== Family ==
He was married twice, firstly (1840) to Mary Hay of Dunse Castle (b.1817), secondly (1863) to Kalitza Janet Erskine Christian Hay (b.1833). He had no children by either marriage.

== Artistic recognition ==
He was portrayed c.1872 by J. M. Barclay wearing full Highland regalia, with a small terrier by his feet, in front of Blair Drummond. A studio photograph of the same date exists and seems to be the basis of the painting.
