= Blair Drummond Safari Park =

Zoo in Scotland

- Interactive map of Blair Drummond Safari Park
- 56.165°N 4.038°W
- Date opened: 15 May 1970
- Location: Blair Drummond, Stirling, Scotland
- Land area: 120 acres (49 ha)
- No. of animals: 300
- Annual visitors: 400,000
- Memberships: BIAZA, EAZA
- Owner: Hector Muir
- Website: www.blairdrummond.com

Blair Drummond Safari Park is a family visitor attraction located in Blair Drummond, Stirling, Scotland. It opened to the public on 15 May 1970 and is home to over 300 animals, many of which roam freely or are kept in large enclosures in the 120-acre (49 ha) estate. The Safari Park is open from mid March until the end of December each year. The park is online ticket sales only and no tickets are sold at the gate.

== History ==
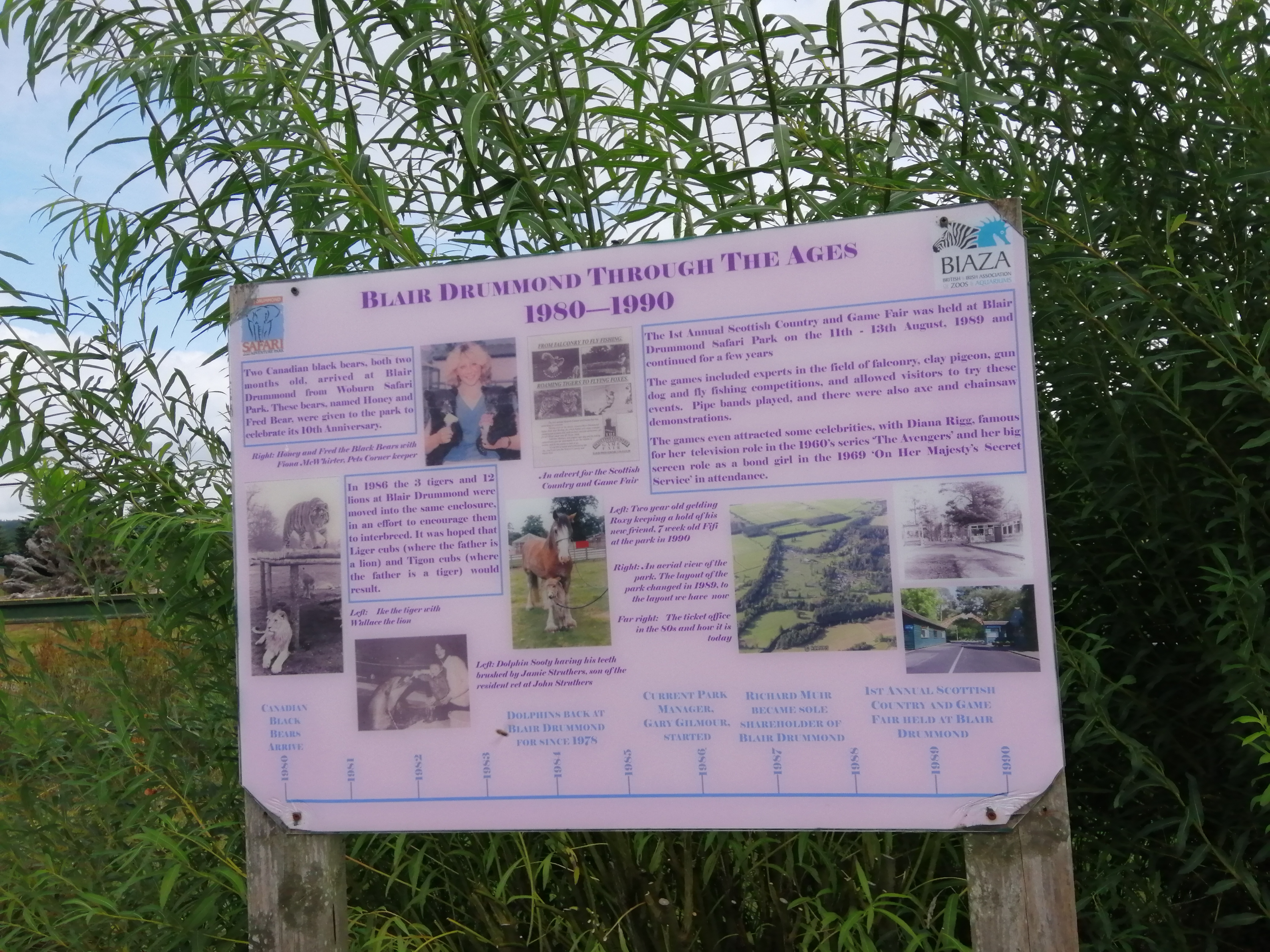
Blair Drummond sign

The original Blair Drummond House was built in 1715. Sir John Kay, a tea merchant from Glasgow, purchased the house and its surrounding land in 1916. Because he had no sons, Kay passed the property to his nephew Sir John Muir, the grandfather of the park's present owner Jamie Muir. The house was a family home until it was sold to the Camphill Movement, a charity that cares for people with special needs, in 1977. The current Blair Drummond House was built in a new location in 1872 by James Campbell Walker, and again in 1923 by James Bow Dunn after a fire destroyed the previous house.

Blair Drummond Safari Park was opened in 1970, with the help of Jimmy Chipperfield, one of Britain's first safari parks (Longleat Safari Park being the first, in 1966).

=== Controversy ===
In June 2021, Born Free called for an investigation of the park over animal deaths.

== The reserves ==
Driving through the lion reserve

=== African reserve ===
The first reserve features non-carnivorous native African species, such as Grant's zebra, Ankole-Watusi cattle, Guineafowl, Lechwe, Kudu and the Southern white rhinoceros. The rhinos are part of a Europe-wide breeding programme which began in 2004 with the arrival of three young rhinos from Kruger National Park: Dorothy (Dot), Graham and Jane. Dorothy and Graham have gone on to have five calves: in 2007, 2009, 2012 and 2014.

=== Lion reserve ===
The second reserve is home solely to African lions. They are also part of a Europe-wide breeding programme, with two of the females having been born in the park. There is currently one male, Zulu, introduced in February 2016 through an exchange with Wildlands Adventure Zoo Emmen to ensure genetic diversity is maintained.

=== Barbary macaque reserve ===
The optional third reserve, "Monkey Jungle", was opened to the public in 2015 and houses solely Barbary macaques. The monkeys were transferred to the park from Gibraltar in 2014 to reduce the problem they were beginning to cause to the peninsula's residents, and to prevent having to cull them as had been carried out previously. The Barbary macaque is listed as endangered by the IUCN Red List and in 2016 the park began to raise money for Barbary macaques being exploited for use as photo props in Morocco.

=== Asian reserve ===
The fourth and final reserve houses herbivorous species native to Asia, such as Père David's deer, Bactrian camels, Nilgai, Axis deer and Eld's deer. In April 2016 the park welcomed the birth of two Père David's deer, a species now extinct in the wild.

== The park ==
The following areas and attractions can be found in the park:

Chimp Island viewed from the boat safari

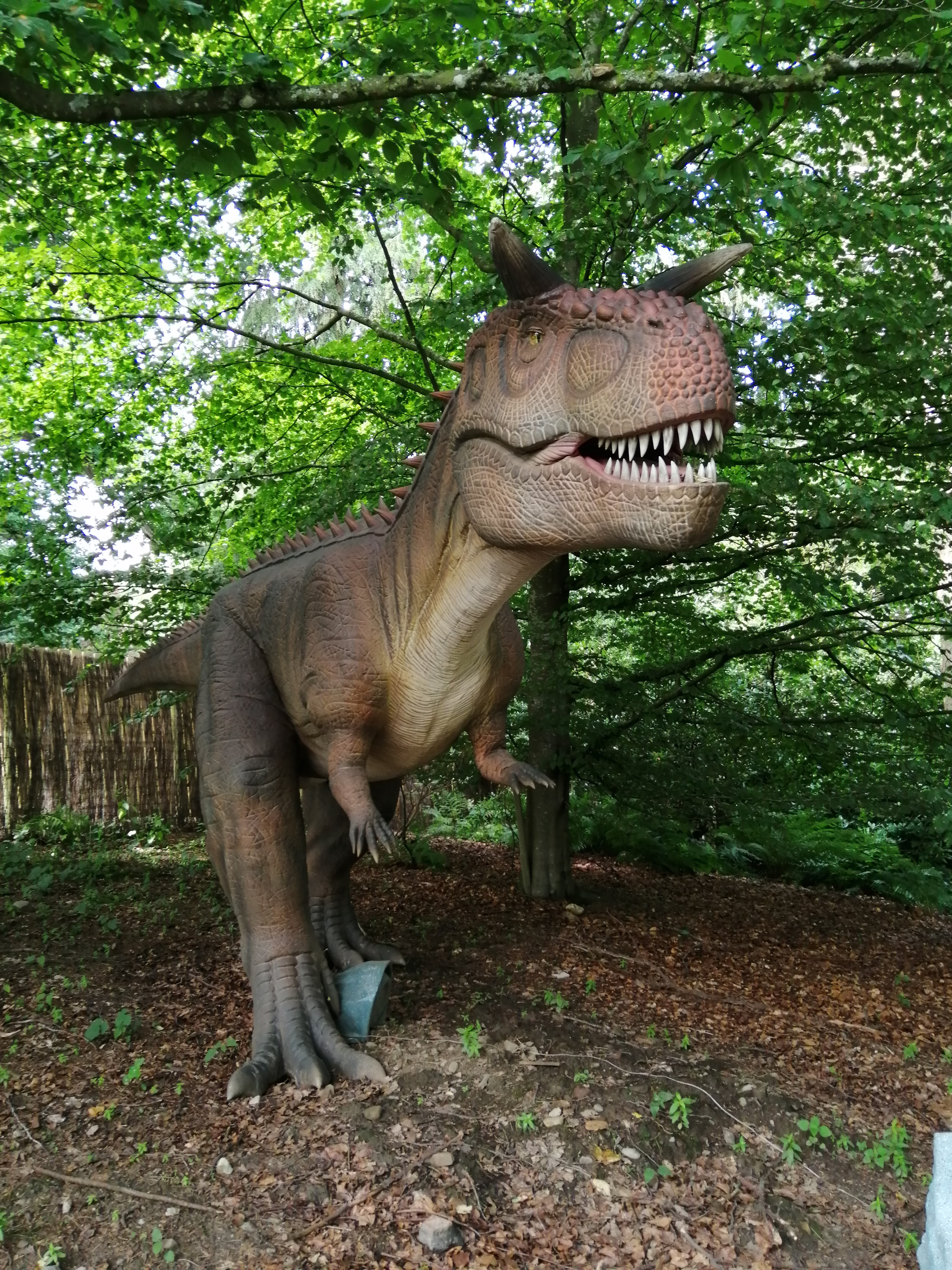
A carnotaurus in the dinosaur area

=== Chimp Island ===
The Boat Safari next to Lemur Land took visitors to view Chimp Island - an island home to a family of chimpanzees. The boat trips stopped running in 2019 and have been replaced in 2025 by a train ride. Visitors can also choose to walk down the 'chimp path', where there is a viewing platform on the far side of the animals' house.

=== Elephants ===
The current elephant enclosure was opened by the Princess Royal in 2013, and was commended in the British and Irish Association of Zoos and Aquariums' annual awards in the category "best new habitat".

=== Dinosaurs ===
In 2020, a dinosaur exhibit was opened. The dinosaurs were constructed with steel frame and silicone skin. They make movements and noises.

== Other activities ==
=== Rides and amusements ===
The park has a large slide and playground, where visitors will find a pirate ship and adventure fort. They are all housed within a sand pit, part of which is under cover to offer shelter in wet weather. Near the sea lion building is the large slide, and near the train station there are pedal boats, a food outlet and a gift shop. Other rides and attractions include dodgems, a kids' rollercoaster, and a carousel.

=== Eating at the park ===
There is a restaurant and several snack outlets, and picnic tables are available for visitors who bring their food and drinks. Visitors can also bring their own BBQ food and book a BBQ on the day of their visit for £10. Disposable BBQs are not permitted in the park.
