= Cunninghame Graham =

British journalist, traveller and politician (1852–1936)

Robert Cunninghame Graham
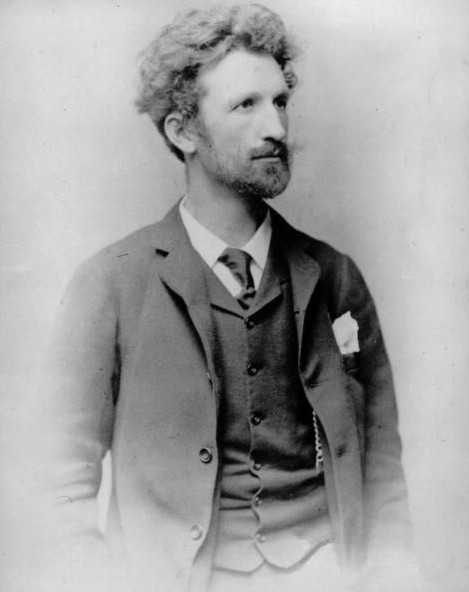
- Cunninghame Graham, c. 1890.

Honorary Vice-President of the Scottish National Party
- In office 7 April 1934 – 20 March 1936
- Preceded by: Position created
- Succeeded by: Position dissolved

President of the National Party of Scotland
- In office 23 June 1928 – 7 April 1934
- Preceded by: Position created
- Succeeded by: Party merged

President of the Scottish Labour Party
- In office 25 August 1888 – 1895
- Preceded by: Position created
- Succeeded by: Party Disestablished

MP for North West Lanarkshire
- In office 1886–1892
- Preceded by: John Baird
- Succeeded by: Graeme Alexander Lockhart Whitelaw
- Majority: 332

Personal details
- Born: 24 May 1852 Chelsea, London, England
- Died: 20 March 1936 (aged 83) Plaza Hotel, Buenos Aires, Argentina
- Resting place: Inchmahome Priory, Lake of Menteith
- Party: Scottish National Party
- Other political affiliations: National Party of Scotland; Scottish Labour Party; Liberal Party
- Education: Harrow School
- Profession: Writer
- Website: https://www.cunninghamegraham.org/

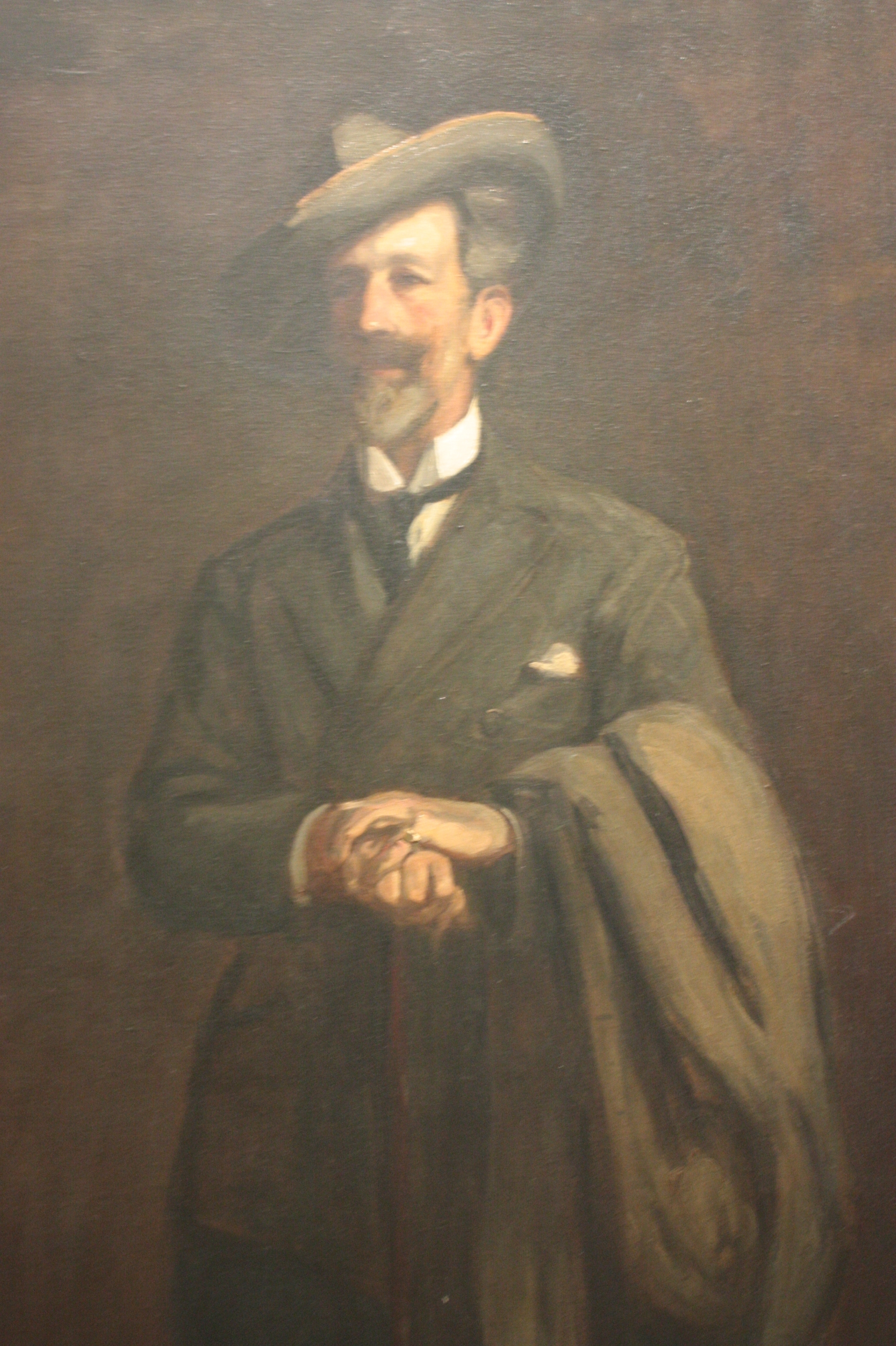
Robert Bontine Cunninghame Graham by John Mansfield Crealock

Robert Bontine Cunninghame Graham (24 May 1852 – 20 March 1936) was a Scottish politician, writer, journalist and adventurer. He was a Liberal Party Member of Parliament (MP); the first ever member of the Parliament of the United Kingdom to declare himself a socialist; elected Vice-President of the Scottish Home Rule Association (SHRA); a founder and first president, of the Scottish Labour Party; elected first President of the National Party of Scotland; and, in 1934, was elected Honorary Vice-President of the Scottish National Party.

== Early life ==
Cunninghame Graham was the eldest son of Major William Bontine of the Renfrew Militia and formerly a Cornet in the Scots Greys with whom he served in Ireland. His mother was the Hon. Anne Elizabeth Elphinstone-Fleeming, daughter of Admiral Charles Elphinstone-Fleeming of Cumbernauld and a Spanish noblewoman, Doña Catalina Paulina Alessandro de Jiménez, who reputedly, along with her second husband, Admiral James Katon, heavily influenced Cunninghame Graham's upbringing.

He spent most of his childhood on the family estate of Finlaystone in Renfrewshire and Gartmore in Stirlingshire, Scotland, with his younger brothers Charles and Malise.

== International travels ==
After being educated at Harrow public school in England, Robert finished his education in Brussels, Belgium, where he learnt Spanish, before moving to Argentina to try to make his fortune cattle ranching at just 17 years of age. He became known as a great adventurer and gaucho there, and was affectionately known as Don Roberto. He also travelled in Morocco disguised as a Turkish sheikh to find the "forbidden" city of Taroudant but was captured by a Caid (Si Taieb ben Si Ahmed El Hassan El Kintafi), prospected for gold in Spain, befriended Buffalo Bill in Texas, and taught fencing in Mexico City, having travelled there by wagon train from San Antonio de Bexar with his young bride "Gabrielle Marie de la Balmondiere" sic, a supposed half-French, half-Chilean poet. After the death of his father in 1883, he reverted to the Cunninghame Graham surname and returned to the UK where he became interested in politics.

== Liberal Party MP ==
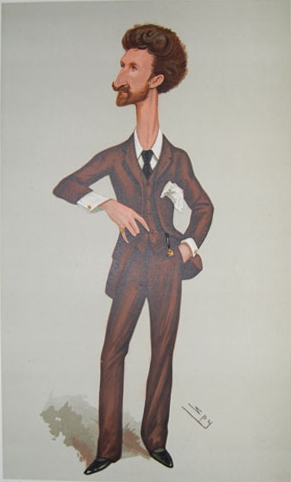
Cunninghame Graham caricatured by Spy in Vanity Fair, 1888

Cunninghame Graham, who claimed to be a Liberal "both by descent and from conviction", was adopted as the Liberal Party candidate for North West Lanarkshire for both the 1885 general election and the 1886 general election. His manifesto was typically Radical Liberal being against an aggressive foreign policy and game laws; for more local government, a graduated income tax, the abolition of primogeniture and entail, free education and local option on the sale of liquor.

However, he more radically also called for:

- the abolition of the House of Lords
- universal suffrage
- religious equality and the disestablishment of the Church of Scotland
- Irish, Scottish and English Home Rule

In 1886, supported by liberals and the Irish, Graham defeated the Unionist candidate by 322 votes. He had stood against the same candidate at the 1885 general election, in which he was defeated by over 1100 votes.

Shortly after his election to Parliament, at a picnic at Gartmore House for the Band of Hope, a Temperance_movement organization, Cunninghame Graham, who saw alcohol as a root of poverty, himself took 'the pledge', about which his wife complained, he had gone "in for it root and branch".

Although professing to respect the office of the Speaker, Robert Cunninghame Graham refused to accept the conventions of the British House of Commons and was frequently "named". On 12 September 1887 he was suspended from parliament for making what was called a "disrespectful reference" to the House of Lords. He was suspended for unparliamentary language in 1888 and in 1892, in response to being named and the question of suspension raised, responded, "Suspend away!" and "...I do not care a damn.", which is alleged to be the first time swearing was used in the Chamber.

Graham's main concerns in the House of Commons were the plight of the unemployed and the preservation of civil liberties. He complained about attempts in 1886 and 1887 by the police to prevent public meetings and free speech. He attended the protest demonstration in Trafalgar Square on 13 November 1887 that was broken up by the police and became known as Bloody Sunday. Graham was badly beaten during his arrest and taken to Bow Street Police Station, where his uncle, Col William Hope VC, attempted to post bail. Both Cunninghame Graham, who was defended by H. H. Asquith, and John Burns were found guilty for their involvement in the demonstration and sentenced to six weeks imprisonment.

When Graham was released from Pentonville prison he continued his campaign to improve the rights of working people and to curb their economic exploitation. He was suspended from the House of Commons in December 1888 for protesting about the working conditions of the chain makers of Cradley Heath. His response to the Speaker of the House, "I never withdraw", was later used by George Bernard Shaw in Arms and the Man.

During his time in Parliament, he became more socialist and more radical, advocating:

- the establishment of an eight-hour working day
- the nationalisation of land, mines and other industries
- free school meals
- disestablishment of the Church of England

Graham was also a vociferous anti-imperialist at the height of British jingoism as well as a high-profile supporter of the women's suffrage movement and Home Rule for Ireland and India.

== Convert to socialism ==
While in Parliament, Graham started attending socialist meetings where he heard and met William Morris; the Fabians George Bernard Shaw and Sydney Webb; trades unionists like John Burns and Annie Besant; and Marxists like H. M. Hyndman and Friedrich Engels. Despite his wealthy origins, Graham, who had been heavily influenced by the American political economist Henry George, was converted to socialism, and he and his wife began to speak at public meetings. He was an impressive orator and was especially good at dealing with hecklers.

== Scottish Independence and the Scottish Labour Party ==
Graham was to become a strong supporter of Scottish independence, though he began as a Home Ruler.

In 1886, he joined the Scottish Home Rule Association (SHRA), for whom he was Vice President, and while in the House of Commons, he made several attempts to persuade fellow MPs of the desirability of a Scottish parliament. Graham joked that he wanted a "national parliament with the pleasure of knowing that the taxes were wasted in Edinburgh instead of London."

In 1888, Graham attended the SHRA Conference at the Anderton's Hotel in Fleet Street and passed a motion "That in the opinion of this Conference the interests of Scotland demand the establishment of a Scotch national Parliament and an Executive Government having control over exclusively Scotch affairs, with a due regard to the integrity of the Empire". The motion was supported by Mr Cuninghame Graham (as name spelt in article), who said he "wanted a Scotch Parliament to do justice to their crofters and keep them at home, to pass an Eight Hours' Bill for their miners, to settle the liquor laws, and to nationalise the land." Peter Esslemont MP attended. Dr G.B Clark, MP for Caithness-shire, chaired the conference.

He supported workers in their industrial disputes and was involved with Annie Besant and the Matchgirls Strike and the 1889 Dockers' Strike. In July 1889, he attended the Marxist Congress of the Second International in Paris with James Keir Hardie, William Morris, Eleanor Marx and Edward Aveling. The following year he made a speech in Calais that was considered by the authorities to be so revolutionary that he was arrested and expelled from France.

Graham was a supporter of the eight-hour day and made several attempts to introduce a Bill on the subject. He made some progress with this in the summer of 1892, but he was unable to persuade the Conservative government, headed by Lord Salisbury, to allocate time for the Bill to be fully debated.

While in the House of Commons, Graham became increasingly more radical and went on to found the Scottish Labour Party with Keir Hardie in 1888, though he did not leave the Liberal Party until 1892.

At the 1892 general election Graham stood as the Independent Labour Party candidate for Glasgow Camlachie. He was heavily defeated, coming third with just 906 votes, bringing his parliamentary career to an end. He remained active in political circles, though, helping his colleague Keir Hardie establish the Independent Labour Party and enter parliament as the MP for West Ham. However, he became disillusioned by the pettiness and dissent of those he called "piss-pot socialists" and increasingly turned to a nascent Scottish nationalism as a means of achieving social justice and cultural revival.

In 1928, Graham was elected (in absentia) President of the National Party of Scotland (NPS), and was elected the Honorary Vice-President of the new Scottish National Party in 1934, for which, despite reservations, he led the country-wide campaign to promote it alongside Compton Mackenzie. He was several times the Glasgow University Scottish Nationalist Association candidate for the Lord Rectorship of the University of Glasgow, which he lost by only sixty-six votes in 1928 to Stanley Baldwin, the Conservative Prime Minister at the time. This event was pivotal in boosting the newly formed National Party of Scotland.

Because of his Scottish nationalism, and criticism of what he saw as the Labour Party's timidity and lack of socialist zeal, Graham has been effectively written out of Labour Party history, and the belief has been circulated that after his electoral defeat in 1892, he retired from politics until the late 1920s. This is entirely incorrect; in fact, between 1905 and 1914, Graham, while retaining the position of elder statesman, social commentator, and renowned world-traveller, became more militant, involving himself in many left-wing causes and protests. Moreover, in 1918, he was persuaded to stand as the Liberal candidate in the new constituency of West Stirlingshire, coming last behind the Unionist and Labour candidates.

There is evidence to suggest that Graham joined the hard-left British Socialist Party, and he was an associate of anarchists (like Peter Kropotkin) and the political assassin Sergei Stepniak but left over the BSP’s opposition to the First World War.

== War Service ==
Despite having been a vociferous pacifist, at the outbreak of the Great War in 1914, Graham (aged 62) unsuccessfully tried to enlist as a rough rider but, following talks with the War Office, he was sent to Argentina to lead a team buying horses for the Western Front. Returning to England in May, 1915, the ship he was on was torpedoed. However, the Captain managed to beach it and no lives (human or equine) were lost.

In 1917, Graham was despatched to Colombia by the Board of Trade to secure beef supplies, which necessitated his travelling the country, often on horseback and sleeping rough, in order to effectively survey cattle resources. His report to the Government, dated 31 March, was meticulously detailed.

== Author ==
Between 1888 and 1892, Graham was a prolific contributor to small-circulation socialist journals, but his literary career took off when he was recruited by Frank Harris to write for the Saturday Review in 1895, and he continued writing for the Saturday until 1926, as well as other journals. His main form was the 'sketch', or sketch-tale', mostly descriptive, atmospheric works on South America and Scotland, which gave his work a unique aesthetic, which carried a subtext of anti-colonialism, nostalgia, and loss. T. E. Lawrence (of Arabia) described his Scottish sketches as "the rain-in-the-air-and-on-the-roof mournfulness of Scotch music in his time-past style [. . .] snap-shots – the best verbal snapshots ever taken I believe."

His many works were collected into anthologies. Subject matter included history, biography, poetry, essays, politics, travel and seventeen collections of short stories or literary sketches. Titles include Father Archangel of Scotland (1896 in conjunction with his wife Gabriela), Thirteen Stories (1900), Success (1902), Hope (1910), Scottish Stories (1914), Brought Forward (1916) and Mirages (1936). Biographies included: Hernando de Soto (1903), Doughty Deeds (1925), a biography of his great-great-grandfather, Robert Graham of Gartmore and Portrait of a Dictator (1933).

His great-niece and biographer, Jean, Lady Polwarth, published a collection of his short stories (or sketches) entitled Beattock for Moffatt and the Best of Cunninghame Graham (1979) and Alexander Maitland added his selection under the title Tales of Horsemen (1981). Professor John Walker published collections of Cunninghame Graham's South American Sketches (1978), Scottish Sketches (1982) and North American Sketches (1986) and Kennedy & Boyd republished the stories and sketches in five volumes (2011 – 2012). In 1988 The Century Travellers reprinted his Mogreb-el-Acksa (1898) and A Vanished Arcadia (1901). The former was the inspiration for George Bernard Shaw's play Captain Brassbound's Conversion. The latter may have helped inspire the award-winning film The Mission. More recently The Long Riders Guild Press have reprinted his equestrian travel works in their Cunninghame Graham Collection. In 2024, a complete, chronological collection of his Scottish sketches was published by Edinburgh University Press.

He helped his close friend Joseph Conrad, whom he had introduced to his publisher Edward Garnett at Duckworth, with research for his novel Nostromo. Other literary friends included Ford Madox Ford, John Galsworthy, W. H. Hudson, George Bernard Shaw (who openly admits his debt to Graham for "Captain Brassbound's Conversion" as well as a key line in Arms and the Man) and G. K. Chesterton, who proclaimed him "The Prince of Preface Writers" and famously declared in his autobiography that while Cunninghame Graham would never be allowed to be Prime Minister, he instead "achieved the adventure of being Cunninghame Graham", which Shaw described as "an achievement so fantastic that it would never be believed in a romance."

There is a seat dedicated to Cunninghame Graham in the Scottish Storytelling Centre in Edinburgh with the inscription: "R B 'Don Roberto' Cunninghame Graham of Gartmore and Ardoch, 1852–1936, A great storyteller".

== Final years ==
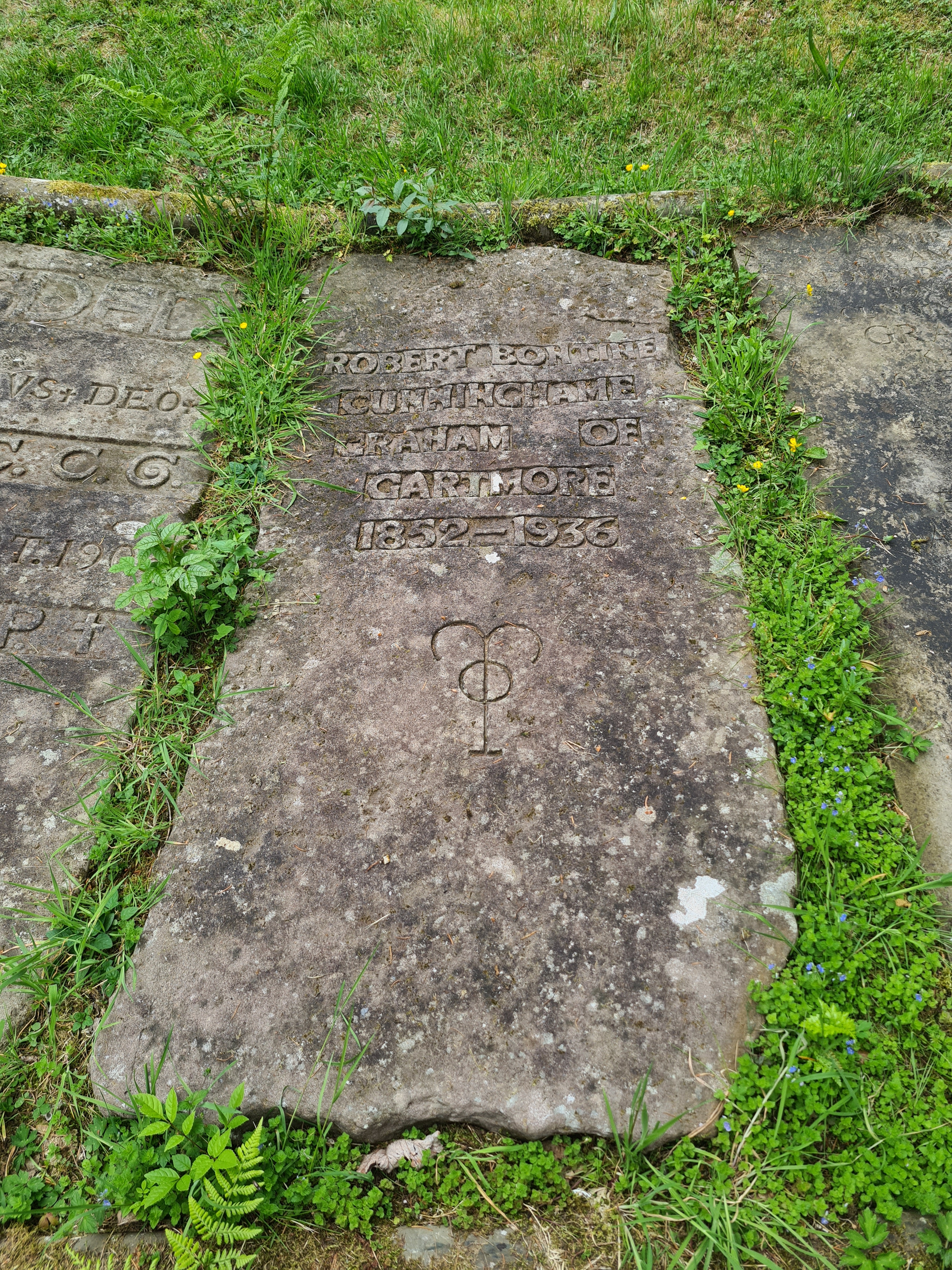
The grave of Robert Bontine Cunninghame Graham on Inchmahome Priory in Scotland.

Graham remained sprightly and rode daily even in his eighties. He continued to write, and held the office of President of the Scottish Branch of the P.E.N. Club, and involve himself in politics. He died from pneumonia on 20 March 1936 at the Plaza Hotel in Buenos Aires, Argentina, following a visit to the birthplace of his friend William Hudson. He lay in state in the Casa del Teatro and received a countrywide tribute led by the President of the Republic before his body was shipped home to be buried beside his wife on 18 April 1936, in the ruined Augustinian Priory on the island of Inchmahome, Lake of Menteith, Stirling.

The following year (June 1937), a monument, the Cunninghame Graham Memorial, was unveiled at Castlehill, Dumbarton, near the family home at Ardoch. Despite the monument being removed to Gartmore in 1986, closer to the principal Graham estate, which he had been forced to sell in 1901 to the shipping magnate and founder of the Clan Line, Sir Charles Cayzer, Bt, the Cunninghame Graham Memorial Park (which is managed by the National Trust for Scotland) is still affectionately locally known as "the Mony".

His estates at Ardoch and feudal baronies of Gartmore and Ardoch passed to his nephew, Captain (later Admiral Sir) Angus Cunninghame Graham, the only son of his brother Cdr. Charles Elphinstone-Fleeming Cunninghame Graham, MVO

== Cunninghame Graham in art ==
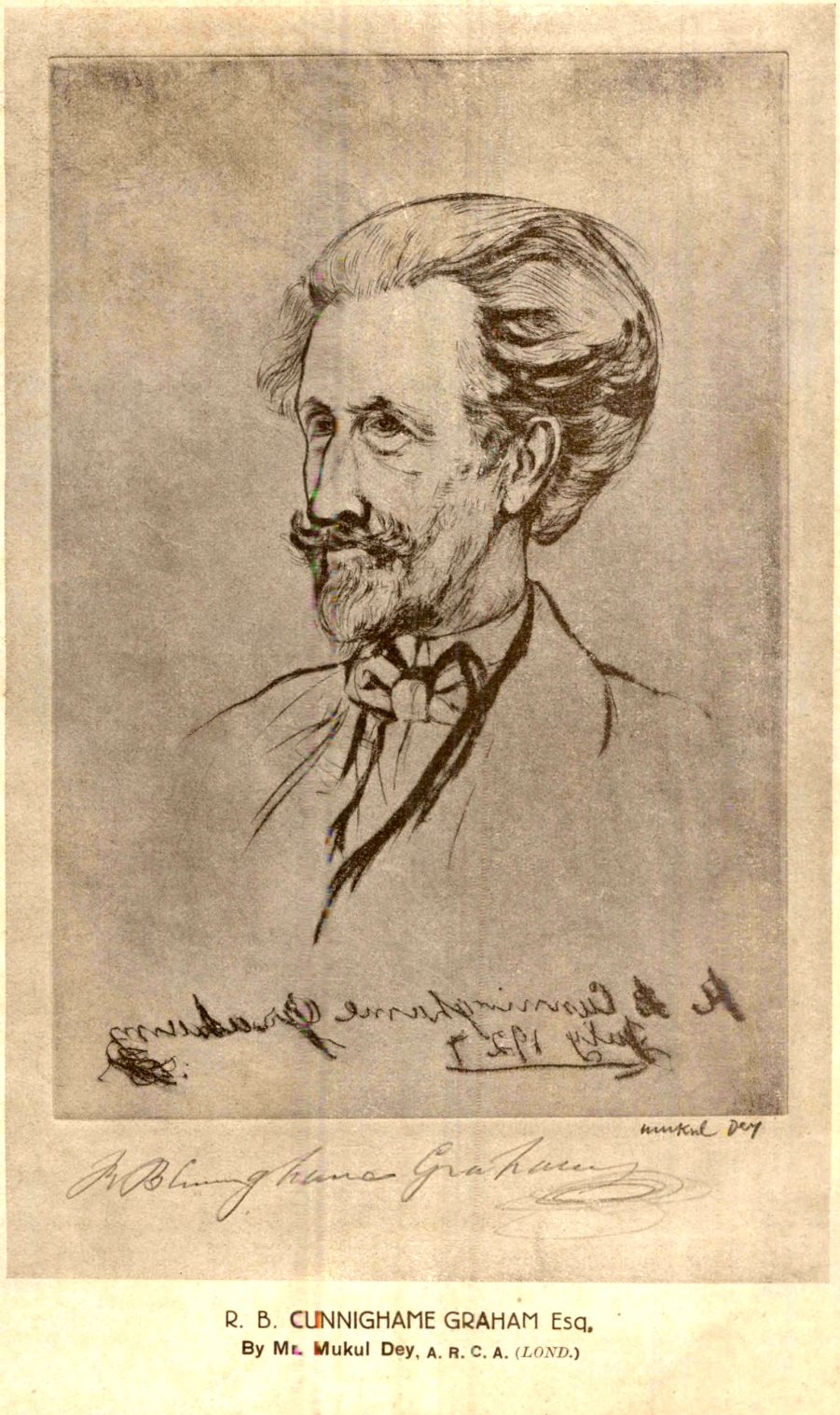
Sketch of Cunninghame Graham by Mukul Dey, published in Modern Review (1928)

Cunninghame Graham was a staunch supporter of the artists of his day and a popular subject. He sat for artists such as Sir William Rothenstein, who painted Don Roberto as The Fencer; Sir John Lavery, whose famous Don Roberto: Commander for the King of Aragon in the Two Sicilies was on the cover of the Penguin Books edition of Conrad's Nostromo for many years and who painted the equestrian portrait of Don Roberto on his favourite horse, Pampa; and George Percy Jacomb-Hood, who painted his official portrait on entering parliament, with whom, along with Whistler, he was personal friends. George Washington Lambert painted him in oil with his horse Pinto and James McBey and Ignacio Zuloaga portrayed him in old age. There are also busts by Weiss and Jacob Epstein. The Dumbarton born artist, William Strang, used Cunninghame Graham as the model for his series of etchings of Don Quixote. It is unsurprising that he was at the mercy of cartoonists such as Tom Merry, who portrayed him in prison garb, and caricaturists such as Max and Spy.

== Cunninghame Graham as literary inspiration ==
Cedric Watts claims that Cunninghame Grahame appears as the hypocritically untrustworthy 'Mr. X' in Conrad's The Informer, as Mr. Courtier in Galsworthy's The Patrician, and as 'Mr. Graham' in Wells's When the Sleeper Wakes. Anne Taylor and James Jauncey have argued that his travels in Morocco were one of the inspirations for the character Sandy Arbuthnot, hero of John Buchan's novel Greenmantle (1916).

== Arms ==
Coat of arms of Bontine Cunninghame Graham of Gartmore, Finlaystone & Ardoch
Crest On a wreath of his liveries, an eagle displayed, in his dexter talon a sword in pale Proper. Helm Gentleman's helmet resting on a Chapeau of Maintenance Gules and ermined Escutcheon Quarterly, 1st and 4th: Or, a pale Gules, charged with a crescent Argent, on a chief Sable, three escallops of the First (Graham); 2nd and 3rd: Or, a fesse chequy Azure and Argent, in chief a chevron Gules (Stewart, Earl of Strathern). Supporters Two lions rampant guardant Proper, armed and langued Gules. Motto For right and reason

== Bibliography ==
- Notes on the district of Menteith: for tourists and others (1895)
- Father Archangel of Scotland and other essays (1896)
- Mogreb-el-Acksa: A Journey in Morocco (1898)
- Aurora La Cujiñi: A Realistic Sketch in Seville (1898)
- The Ipané (1899)
- Thirteen Stories (1900)
- A Vanished Arcadia: Being Some Account of the Jesuits in Paraguay, 1607 to 1767 (1901)
- Success (1902)
- Hernando de Soto; together with an account of one of his captains, Gonçalo Silvestre (1903)
- Progress (1905)
- His People (1906)
- Santa Teresa: being some account of her life and times (1907)
- Rhymes from a world unknown (Preface) (1908)
- Faith (1909)
- Hope (1910)
- Charity (1912)
- A Hatchment (1913)
- Scottish Stories (1914)
- Bernal Diaz del Castillo: being some account of him (1915)
- Brought Forward (1917)
- A Brazilian mystic: being the life and miracles of Antonio Conselheiro (1920)
- Cartagena and the Banks of the Sinú (1920)
- The Conquest of New Granada: Being the Life of Gonzalo Jimenez de Quesada (1922)
- The Dream of the Magi (1923)
- Doughty Deeds: an account of the life of Robert Graham of Gartmore (1925)
- Pedro de Valdivia, conqueror of Chile (1926)
- Redeemed: And Other Sketches (1927)
- Jose Antonio Paez (1929)
- Thirty Tales & Sketches (1929)
- Writ in sand (1932)
- Portrait of a dictator: Francisco Solano Lopez (1933)
- Mirages (1936)
- Rodeo: A Collection of the Tales and Sketches (1936)
- Reincarnation: The Best Short Stories of R. B. Cunninghame Graham (1979) posthumous

== Bibliographies ==
- A bibliography of the first editions of the works of Robert Bontine Cunninghame Graham, compiled with a foreword by Leslie Chaundy, London: Dulau, & Co. 1924
- Cunninghame Graham and Scotland: an annotated bibliography, John Walker, Dollar: Douglas S. Mack, 1980

Parliament of the United Kingdom
Preceded by John Baird	Member of Parliament for North West Lanarkshire; 1886–1892	Succeeded by Graeme Alexander Lockhart Whitelaw
Party political offices
Preceded by New position	President of the Scottish Labour Party; 1888–1895	Succeeded by Party disestablished
Party political offices
Preceded by New position	President of the National Party of Scotland; 1928-1934	Succeeded by Party merged with Scottish Party
Party political offices
Preceded by New position	Honorary Vice-President of the Scottish National Party; 1934–1936	Succeeded by Position dissolved
