= Cunninghame Graham Memorial =

Memorial cairn in Scotland

Coordinates: 56.14726°N 4.37913°W

Cunninghame Graham Memorial

The Cunninghame Graham Memorial is a stone monument dedicated to the memory of 'Don Roberto' Robert Bontine Cunninghame Graham (1852–1936) 15th of Gartmore and 19th of Ardoch, a Scottish author, politician, traveller and horseman .

The cairn was designed by Alexander Wright and was erected in June 1937, a year after Cunninghame Graham's death, on land that he had given to the National Trust for Scotland at Castlehill, Dumbarton. The monument, which is built of Scottish stone, contains stones from Argentina (top), Uruguay (left) and Paraguay (right), countries in which Don Roberto had lived in his youth and about which he had written. Between these stones is a medallion of Cunninghame Graham (in his latter years) by the Liverpool born artist Alexander Proudfoot, RSA, who taught sculpture at Glasgow School of Art. Below the medallion is an epitaph, which reads:

"Robert Bontine Cunninghame Graham 1852–1936 – Famous Author – Traveller and Horseman – Patriotic Scot and Citizen of the World – As Betokened by the Stones above. Died in Argentina, interred in Inchamahome – He Was a Master of Life – A King Among Men"

On the Argentinian stone, there is a portrait of his favourite horse Pampa, an Argentine mustang which he had rescued from pulling trams in Glasgow and rode for some 20 years and the inscription:

"To Pampa my black Argentine who I rode for twenty years without a fall. May the earth lie light upon him as lightly as he trod upon its face. Vale...or until so long. Don Roberto."

One of Pampa's hooves is buried beneath the monument.

At the opening ceremony, which was attended by the Duke of Montrose (for Scotland), Dr Alberto Guani (for Uruguay) and Cunninghame Graham's friend and biographer, Aimé Tschiffely (for Argentina), a wreath was laid by his great-nephew, Robert Elphinstone Cunninghame Graham.

The monument suffered considerable damage through vandalism during the 1970s and was moved in 1986 to the village of Gartmore (where, until 1900, Gartmore House had been the principal seat of the Cunninghame Graham family), and was unveiled on Cunninghame Graham's birthday (24 May) by the former Argentinian Ambassador, Carlos Ortiz de Rozas. It is currently in the care of the National Trust for Scotland Despite the removal of the monument to Gartmore, the Cunninghame Graham Memorial Park at Castlehill is affectionately known as "the Mony" and the original site of the Memorial marked by a stone.

In 2012 the National Trust for Scotland carried out significant conservation work on the monument which was completed in time for the 160th anniversary of Cunninghame Graham's birth. A new stone was added to commemorate another of Don Roberto's horses, Pingo, and a new information panel was placed nearby.
