= Gartmore =

Village in Stirling, Scotland

Coordinates: 56.143°N 4.382°W

Gartmore: Scottish Gaelic: An Gart Mòr
- Main Street in Gartmore

- Location within the Stirling council area
- OS grid reference: NS520970
- Civil parish: Port of Menteith
- Council area: Stirling
- Lieutenancy area: Stirling and Falkirk
- Country: Scotland
- Sovereign state: United Kingdom
- Post town: Stirling
- Postcode district: FK8
- Dialling code: 01877
- Police: Scotland
- Fire: Scottish
- Ambulance: Scottish
- UK Parliament: Stirling and Strathallan
- Scottish Parliament: Stirling
- Website: Gartmore Village

Gartmore (Scottish Gaelic An Gart Mòr) is a village in the Stirling council area, Scotland. It is a village with a view of the Wallace Monument in Stirling, almost 25 miles away. In the Land Registration County of Perthshire, it is one mile from the A81 Glasgow to Aberfoyle road, three miles south of Aberfoyle. The Rob Roy Way walking route passes nearby.

The village was founded in 1725 by Nicol Graham of Gartmore.

One of the villages more famous residents was Robert Bontine Cunninghame Graham at Gartmore House, to whom there is a monument in the village, the Cunninghame Graham Memorial.
