= Henry Home-Drummond =

Scottish advocate, landowner, agricultural improver and politician

Henry Home-Drummond FRSE FSA

Member of Parliament for Stirlingshire
- In office 1821–1831
- Preceded by: Sir Charles Edmonstone
- Succeeded by: William Ramsay

Member of Parliament for Perthshire
- In office 1840–1852
- Preceded by: William Murray
- Succeeded by: Sir William Stirling-Maxwell

Personal details
- Born: 28 July 1783
- Died: 12 September 1867 (aged 84)
- Resting place: Kincardine-in-Menteith

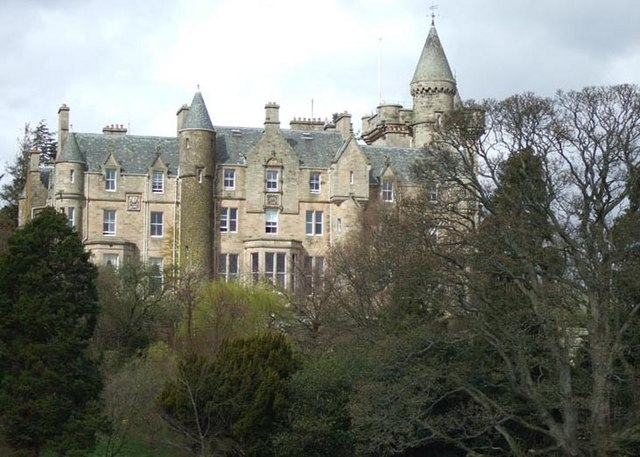
Blair Drummond House

Henry Home-Drummond FRSE FSA (28 July 1783 – 12 September 1867) was a Scottish advocate, landowner, agricultural improver, and politician.

== Life ==
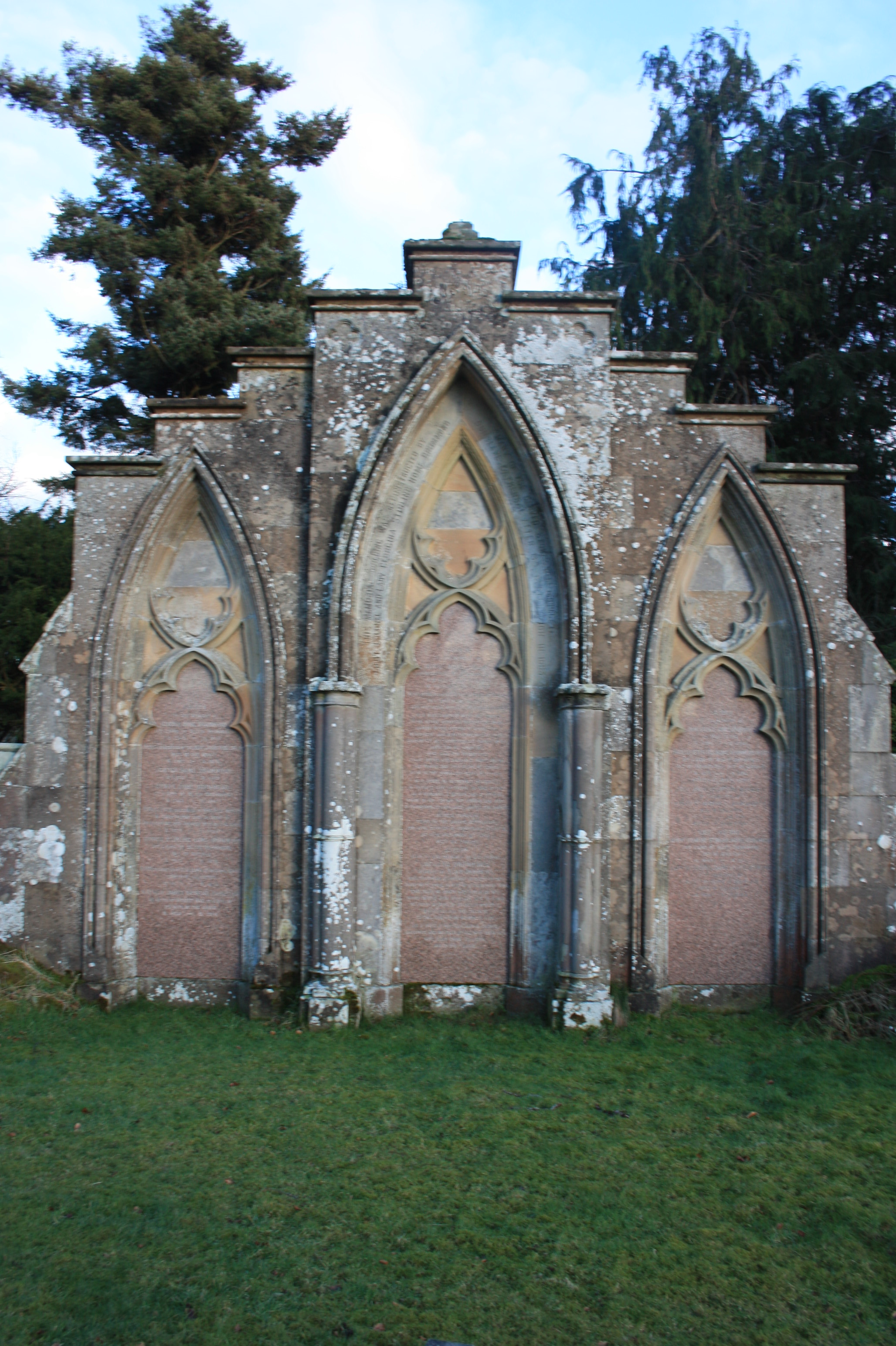
The Home-Drummond grave, Kincardine-in-Menteith.

He was born on 28 July 1783, the son of George Home Drummond of Blair Drummond and his wife (and cousin) Janet Jardine, daughter of Reverend John Jardine minister of the Tron Kirk and Dean of the Chapel Royal.

He was educated at the High School in Edinburgh and then studied law at the University of Oxford graduating as a Bachelor of Civil Law (|BCL) in 1809. The family were one of the first to occupy the new houses in Edinburgh's New Town, living in a townhouse at 128 Princes Street, facing onto Edinburgh Castle in addition to their other estates. His father had a similar house at 110 Princes Street.

Home-Drummond became a Scottish advocate in 1808, and served later as Vice-Lieutenant of Perthshire.

He was elected a Fellow of the Royal Society of Edinburgh in 1815. His proposers were John Playfair, George Steuart Mackenzie and Macvey Napier.

He was Member of Parliament for Stirlingshire from 1821 to 1831 and for Perthshire as a Conservative from 1840 to 1852.

In 1833 his address is listed as 28 Princes Street in Edinburgh's New Town. His country estate is shown as Blair Drummond.

He is buried in Kincardine-in-Menteith in the Home-Drummond grave, just west of Blair Drummond.

== Publications ==
- On Wedge-Draining Clay Land
- On The Salmon Fishery
- On Sawdust As Manure

== Family ==
On 14 April 1812 he married Christian Moray of Abercairney (died 1864). She was the eldest daughter of Charles Moray Stirling. They had a daughter who later became Anne Murray, Duchess of Atholl, and two sons, George Stirling Home Drummond FRSE and Charles Stirling Home Drummond Moray of Abercairney.

Parliament of the United Kingdom
Preceded by Sir Charles Edmonstone, Bt	Member of Parliament for Stirlingshire; 1821–1831	Succeeded by William Ramsay
Preceded by Viscount Stormont	Member of Parliament for Perthshire; 1840–1852	Succeeded by Sir William Stirling-Maxwell, Bt
