= Flanders Moss =

Area of raised bog lying in the Carse of Stirling, Scotland

Flanders Moss National Nature Reserve
- IUCN category IV (habitat/species management area)
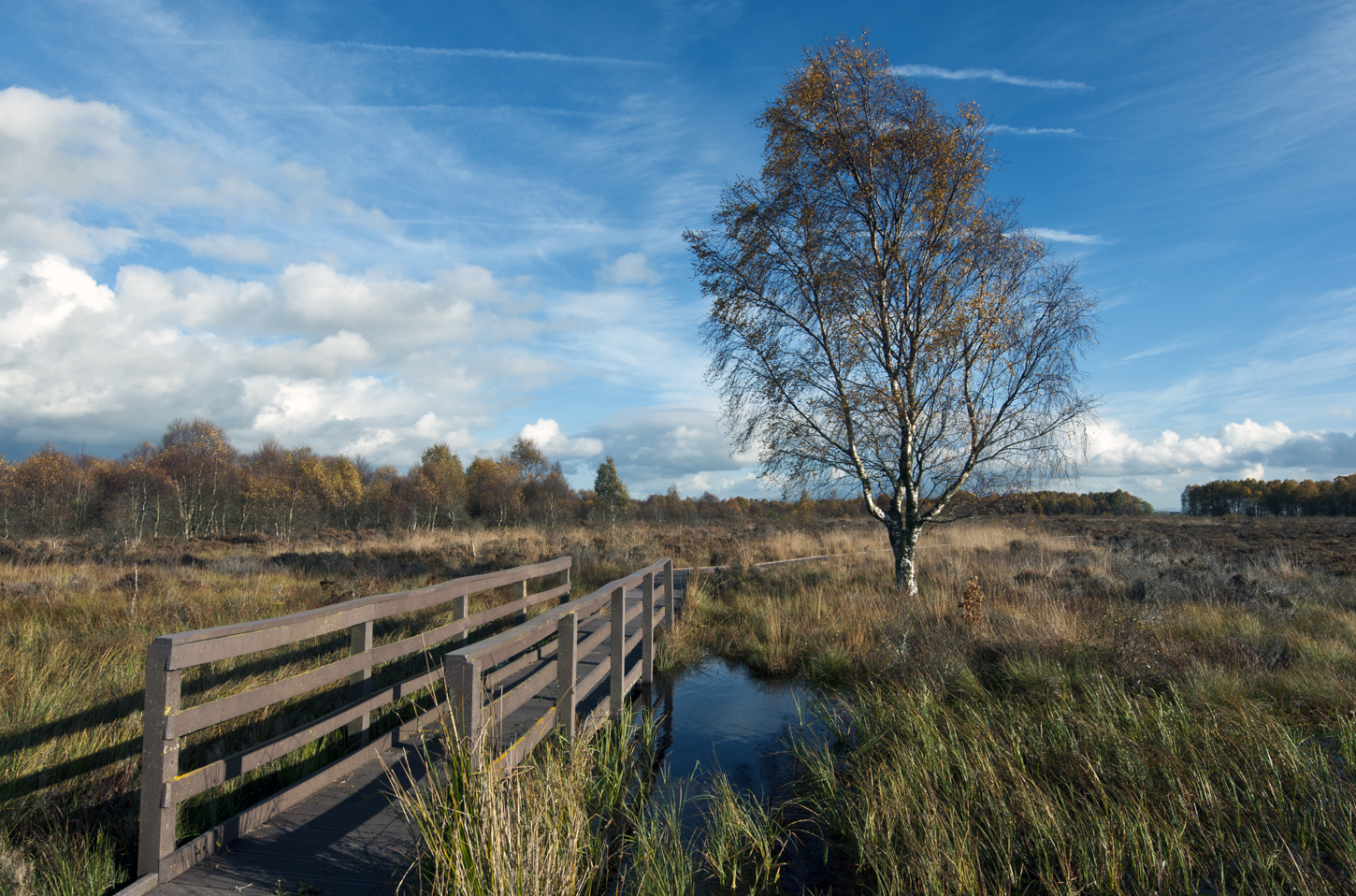

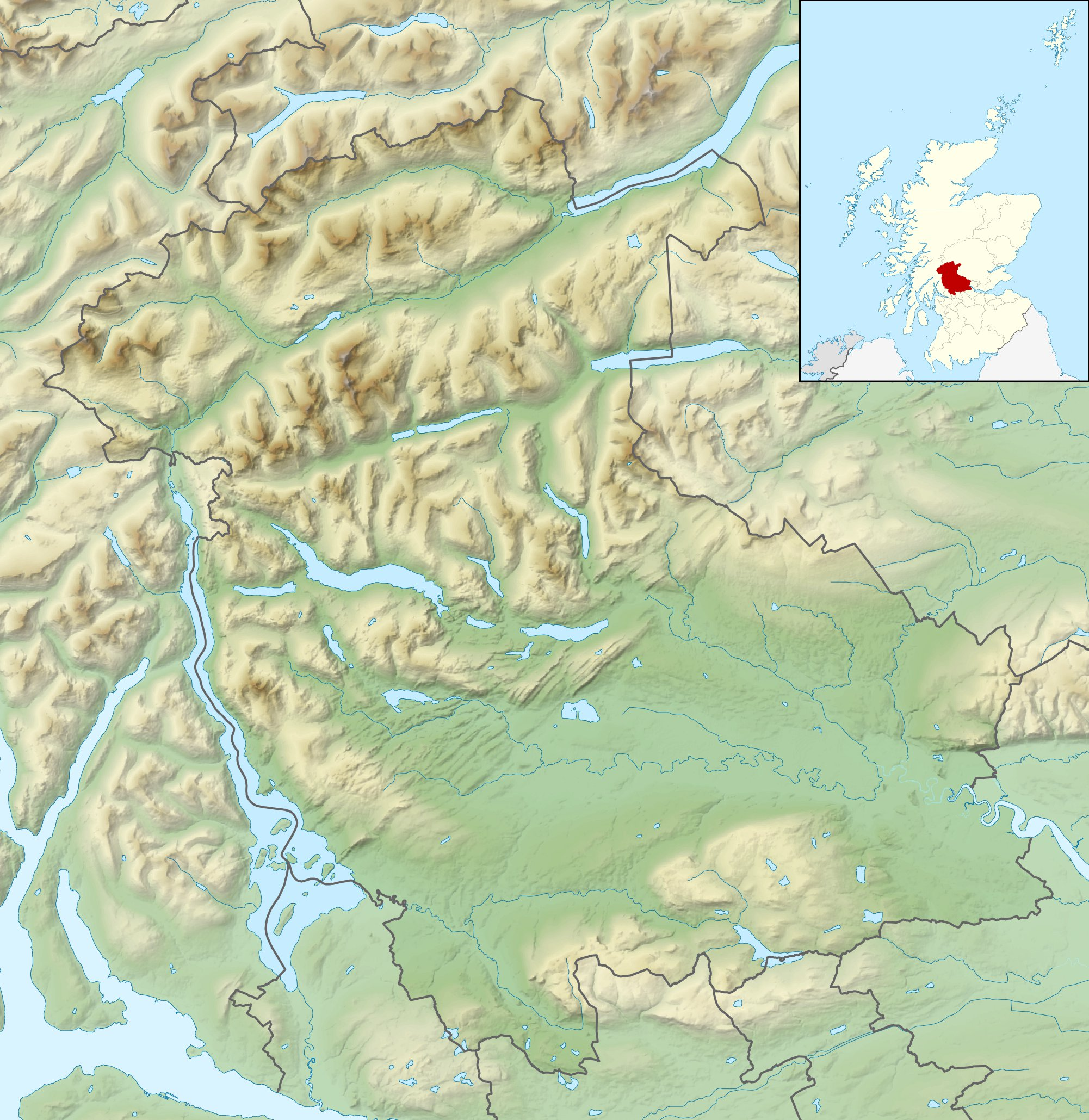
- Location within Stirling
- Location: Stirling, Scotland
- Coordinates: 56.159°N 4.200°W
- Area: 822 ha (2,030 acres)
- Established: 1982
- Governing body: NatureScot
- Website: Flanders Moss National Nature Reserve

Flanders Moss (Scottish Gaelic: A’ Mhòine Fhlànrasach) is an area of raised bog lying in the Carse of Forth in west Stirlingshire, Scotland. The villages of Thornhill and Port of Menteith lie to the north with the villages of Kippen and Buchlyvie lying to the south. The moss is a National Nature Reserve, managed by NatureScot. Formed on the Carse of Stirling over 8000 years ago, it is an internationally important habitat currently undergoing active restoration. The eastern part of Flanders Moss is the largest raised bog in Europe to remain in a predominantly near-natural state.

As well as being an important habitat for wildlife, Flanders Moss also plays a key role for carbon sequestration acting as a carbon sink.

== Flora and fauna ==
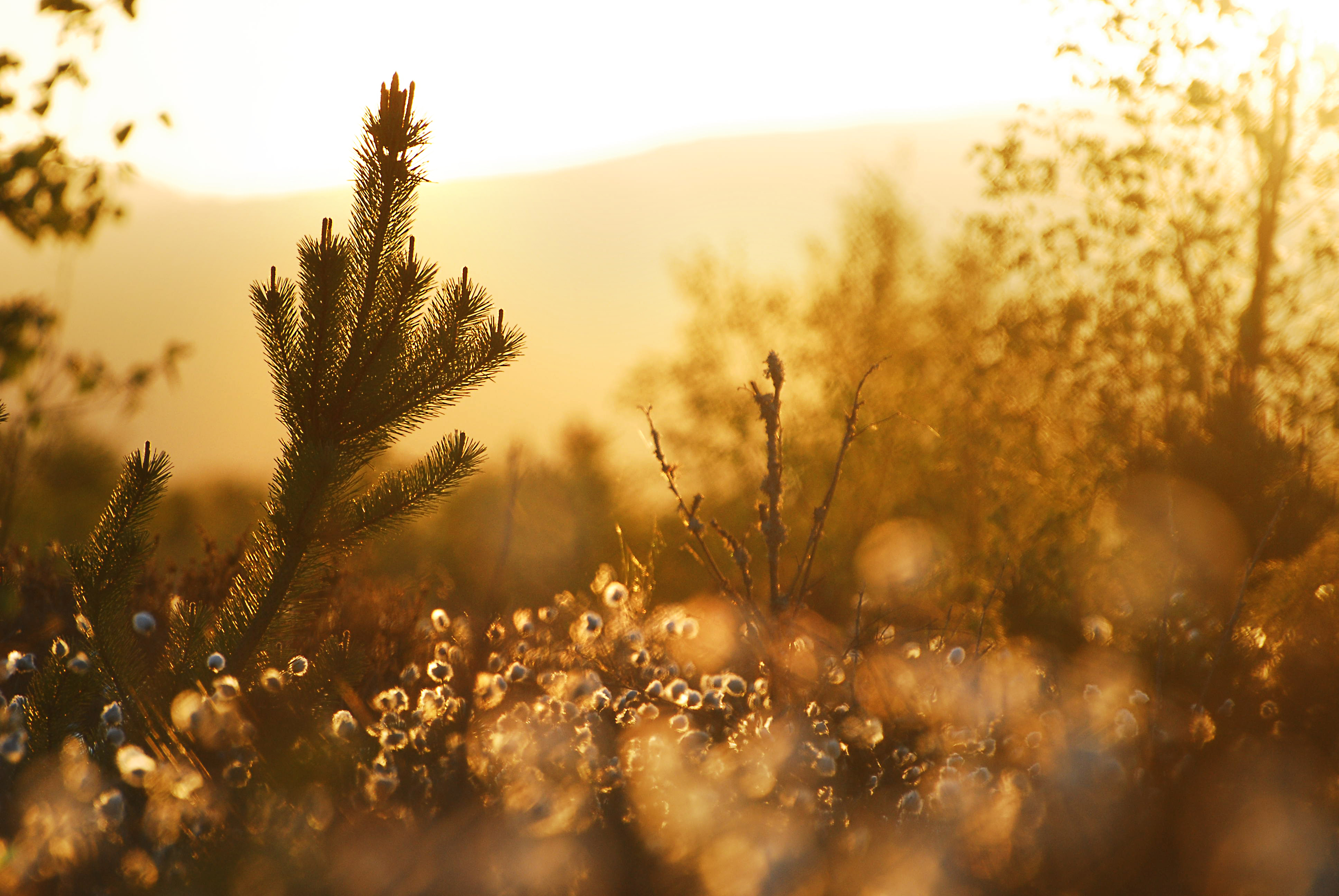
Flora of the Flanders Moss National Nature Reserve.

The bog is composed of an underlayer of sphagnum mosses, on top of which grows heather, cross-leaved heath and cotton-grass. Core samples from the peat show that there were very few trees on the bog for most of its life, however trees and scrub have spread over around 200 ha: these are predominantly birch, although Scots pine and the non-native rhododendron can also be found. The moss supports many plant species that are specialised to boggy conditions, including round-leaved sundew, cranberry, bog asphodel, white beak-sedge, and the nationally scarce bog rosemary.

The bog is home to many species of invertebrates, especially moths: 215 species of moth have been recorded here, including rare species such as Lampronia fuscatella and the Rannoch brindled beauty. Many of the invertebrate are associated with the trees and scrub on the bog. Bird species known to breed at Flanders Moss include snipe, curlew and stonechat on the open parts of the moss, with tree pipit, cuckoo and wood warbler preferring the wooded areas. Winter visitors include whooper swans, and greylag and pink-footed geese. Raptors such as hen harriers, short-eared owls and ospreys can also be seen.

Red and roe deer are known to visit the reserve, and otters make use the network of ditches to pass through the area. Flanders Moss is also home to many species of both reptiles and amphibians. Reptile species include adders, viviparous lizards, and slow worm.

== History ==
The enclosure at Ballangrew on the western edge of the moss may have served as a hunting lodge during the mediaeval period. During the 18th and early 19th centuries objects dating from the Bronze Age to the Roman period were found in the vicinity of Ballangrew, including a Bronze Age cauldron made of beaten bronze.

There are a number of other archaeological sites surrounding the moss, many of which consist of ditches, peat banks and dams used to drain the land to improve it for agriculture. During the 18th century, drainage of the land was encouraged by the lawyer, historian and improver Henry Home, Lord Kames, but a substantial portion survived this development at two sites - West Flanders Moss and East Flanders Moss.

The Strathendrick and Aberfoyle Railway was built through West Flanders Moss. Opening in 1880, the line ran between the villages of Buchlyvie and Gartmore. In the 1970s, the rest of West Flanders Moss was drained and planted with a commercial forest by the Forestry Commission, though much of the plantation is now being removed and the moss restored to its natural state.

== Management ==
Flanders Moss is a site of special scientific interest, and was designated as part of a special area of conservation on 17 March 2005: the Flanders Mosses SAC includes four other raised bogs in the Carse of Stirling: Collymoon Moss, Killorn Moss, Offerance Moss and Shirgarton Moss. Scottish Natural Heritage purchased rights on the site in 1995. The site is designated a Category IV protected area by the International Union for Conservation of Nature.

NatureScot owns 108 hectares (270 acres) of the reserve, and manage the remaining area via agreements or leases with the other 4 private landowners. NatureScot is seeking to reverse the drying effect of historical ditch construction, peat removal and tree growth. Ditches are being dammed, with the aim of raising the level of the water table to as close to the surface as possible. The agency is also removing trees and non-native rhododendron, focusing on maintaining open areas free of trees, whilst leaving more mature areas of native woodland intact. Sheep are grazed on the reserve to prevent new trees becoming established.

== Visitors ==
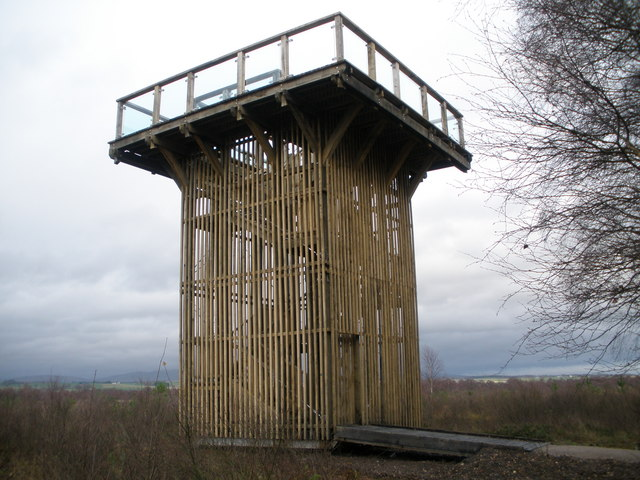
Observation tower overlooking Flanders Moss.

The reserve is now visited by around 8000 people each year. There is an access track leading to a car park on the eastern side of the site; here there is a viewing tower and a short (900 m) waymarked trail. NatureScot plan to look providing new paths on and around Flanders Moss, aiming to provide longer routes, access to the west side of the moss, and potentially a link to the village of Thornhill.
