= John Goundry Holburn =

Scottish politician and member of parliament

Member of Parliament for North West Lanarkshire
- In office 24 July 1895 – 23 January 1899
- Preceded by: Graeme Whitelaw
- Succeeded by: Charles Mackinnon Douglas

Personal details
- Born: 12 April 1843
- Died: 23 January 1899 (aged 55) Leith
- Occupation: Tinplate worker

John Goundry Holburn (12 February 1843 – 23 January 1899) was a Scottish politician and a member of parliament for North West Lanarkshire from 1895 to 1899.

Holburn was born 12 April 1843 the son of Thomas Holburn of Durham, he was self-educated and became a tinplate-worker. Between 1871 and 1875 he was President of the Edinburgh and Leith Trades Council and from 1890 to 1895 a member of Leith Town Council. In the 1895 general election Holburn was elected to represent North West Lanarkshire with a majority of only 97. He died in office on 25 January 1899.

Parliament of the United Kingdom
Preceded by Graeme Whitelaw	Member of Parliament for Lanarkshire North West; 1895–1899	Succeeded by Charles Mackinnon Douglas
