= A81 road =

Road in Scotland

Coordinates: 56.05614°N 4.39687°W

A81

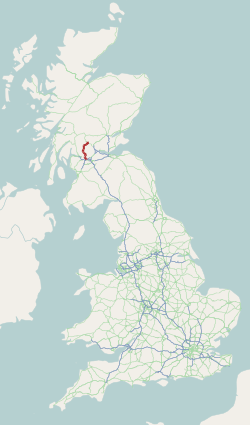

Route information
- Length: 35.5 mi (57.1 km)

Major junctions
- South end: A804 in Cowcaddens, Glasgow
- North end: A84 in Callander

Location
- Country: United Kingdom
- Constituent country: Scotland
- Council areas: Glasgow, East Dunbartonshire, Stirling
- Primary destinations: Callander, Glasgow

Road network
- Roads in the United Kingdom; Motorways; A and B road zones
← A80	→ A82

The A81 road is a major road in Scotland. It runs from Glasgow to Callander via Woodside and Maryhill within the city, as well as Bearsden, Milngavie and Strathblane, a total of 30 miles (48 km).

The A81 has been ranked among the five most dangerous roads in Scotland based on serious and fatal accidents between 2007 and 2009, in proportion to volume of traffic.

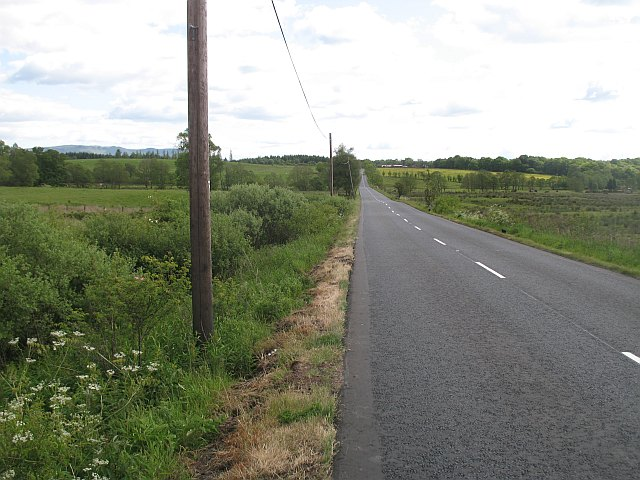
A long straight on the Glasgow – Aberfoyle road where it crosses an area of wetland

== Junction list ==
Council area	Location	mi	km	Destinations	Notes
Glasgow	Cowcaddens	0.0	0.0	A804 (Phoenix Road / Dobbie's Loan) / Garscube Road to M8 / M77 / M80 / A879 – Charing Cross, Port Dundas	Southern terminus
East Dunbartonshire	Bearsden	3.9	6.3	A739 south / A809 north to A810 – Bearsden Cross, Drymen, Hardgate, Canniesburn Toll	To A810, Bearsden Cross, Drymen and Hardgate signed northbound only, A739 and Canniesburn Toll southbound only; northern terminus of A739; southern terminus of A809
East Dunbartonshire	Bearsden	4.6	7.4	Roman Drive (A808 west)	Eastern terminus of A808
East Dunbartonshire	Milngavie	5.9	9.5	A807 east (Auchenhowie Road) – Torrance, Kirkintilloch	Information signed southbound only; western terminus of A807
Stirling	Strathblane	10.2	16.4	A891 east (Campsie Road) – Campsie Glen, Lennoxtown	Western terminus of A891
Stirling	Killearn	13.7	22.0	A875 north – Killearn, Balfron	Southern terminus of A875
Stirling	Drymen– Balfron boundary	19.0	30.6	A811 west (Stirling Road) to B858 – Erskine Bridge, Drymen, Balloch, Balmaha	Southern terminus of A811 concurrency
Stirling	Drymen– Balfron– Buchlyvie boundary	19.1	30.7	A811 east – Stirling	Northern terminus of A811
Stirling		25.4	40.9	A821 north to B829 – Stronachlachar, Aberfoyle	Southern terminus of A821
Stirling	Port of Menteith	30.1	48.4	A873 east to A84 – Stirling	Western terminus of A873
Stirling	Callander	35.5	57.1	A84 (Main Street) / Cross Street to A85 – Crianlarich, Stirling	Northern terminus
1.000 mi = 1.609 km; 1.000 km = 0.621 mi: Concurrency terminus
