= Port of Menteith =

Village in Scotland

Coordinates: 56.184°N 4.285°W

Port of Menteith: Scottish Gaelic: Port Loch Innis Mo Cholmaig
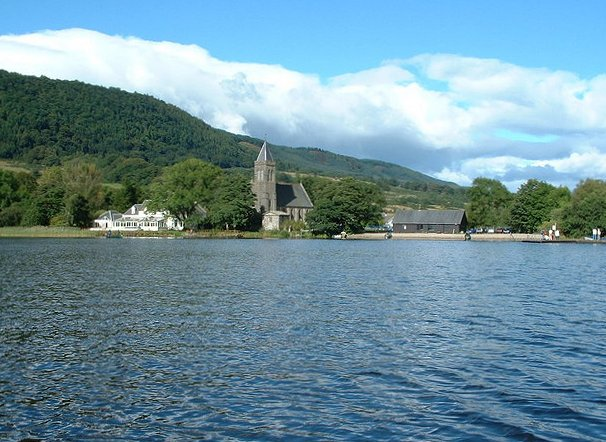
- Looking back from the Lake of Menteith to Port of Menteith, the 18th century kirk rising up from the trees and the hotel to the left

- Location within the Stirling council area
- Population: 768 (2001)
- OS grid reference: NN581013
- Civil parish: Port of Menteith
- Council area: Stirling
- Lieutenancy area: Stirling and Falkirk
- Country: Scotland
- Sovereign state: United Kingdom
- Post town: Stirling
- Postcode district: FK8
- Dialling code: 01877
- Police: Scotland
- Fire: Scottish
- Ambulance: Scottish
- UK Parliament: Stirling and Strathallan
- Scottish Parliament: Stirling
- Website: portofmenteith.org.uk

Port of Menteith (Scottish Gaelic: Port Loch Innis Mo Cholmaig) is a village and civil parish in the Stirling district of Scotland, the only significant settlement on the Lake of Menteith. It was established as a burgh of barony, then named simply Port (Scottish Gaelic: Am Port), in 1457 by King James III of Scotland. It lies in the historic county and Registration County of Perthshire.

The village lies at the north-eastern edge of the Lake, at the junction of the A81 road with the B8034 road, which runs south, just to the west of Flanders Moss, to meet the A811 road at Arnprior. The elevation is around 25 m (82 ft) above sea level. The country around is generally low-lying, except to the north where the Menteith Hills rise, including Beinn Dearg (426 m), with the Trossachs and the southern Highlands beyond. The Parish includes the outlying settlements of Cobleland, Dykehead, Gartmore and Ruskie.

The parish of Port of Menteith, with an area of 7,226 hectares (17,856 acres), had a resident population of 768 in the United Kingdom Census 2001, down from 884 in 1991.

In the summer months a ferry runs from Port of Menteith to the island of Inchmahome, site of the Historic Scotland-maintained Inchmahome Priory. The village is home to a fishing club and is the starting point for anglers on the Lake of Menteith. Nick Nairn's cookery school is based at Loch End, just south of Port of Menteith at the south-east corner of the Lake.

Nearby Rednock House, the home of retired IndyCar champion Dario Franchitti, is a historic Laird's House remodelled by the architect Robert Brown of Edinburgh in 1827. Its grounds include a walled garden, ice house and ornamental water garden.
