= A811 road =

Road in Scotland

A811

Route information
- Length: 29.7 mi (47.8 km)

Major junctions
- east end: Stirling; 56.0729°N 3.5714°W
- west end: Balloch; 55.5955°N 4.3550°W

Location
- Country: United Kingdom
- Constituent country: Scotland

Road network
- Roads in the United Kingdom; Motorways; A and B road zones

The A811 is a road in central Scotland. It runs from Stirling to Balloch.

== Route ==
The road starts off in the centre of Stirling, at the Craigs Roundabout. Soon, it leaves Stirling and crosses the M9 without a junction, although there may be one built in the future. At the moment, drivers will need to use the A84 and the B8075 for access to the M9 motorway. The road is not interrupted until a roundabout where the A811 and the B822 meet. It then passes through Arnprior, where the B8034 and 2 unclassified roads meet with the A811. After Arnprior, it passes through Buchlyvie, where the B835 meets with the A811. After Buchlyvie, the road meets with the A875. After this junction, the road meets with the A81 and then continues on to a junction with the A809. It enters West Dunbartonshire and passes Gartocharn and then it terminates at a roundabout with the A82.

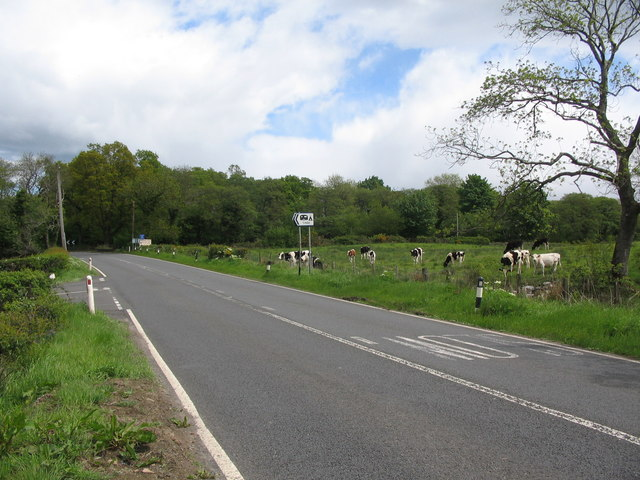
A view looking northeast along the A811 Old Military Road at the junction to Lagganbeg
