= Buchlyvie =

Coordinates: 56.115°N 4.294°W

Buchlyvie: Scottish Gaelic: Both Shlèibhidh; Scots: Buchlyvie
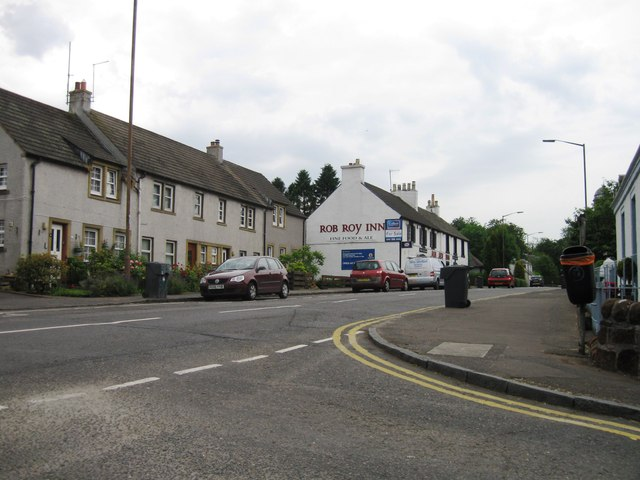
- Rob Roy Inn, Buchlyvie

- Location within the Stirling council area
- Population: 550 (2020)
- OS grid reference: NS573937
- Civil parish: Kippen
- Council area: Stirling
- Lieutenancy area: Stirling and Falkirk
- Country: Scotland
- Sovereign state: United Kingdom
- Post town: Stirling
- Postcode district: FK8
- Dialling code: 01360
- Police: Scotland
- Fire: Scottish
- Ambulance: Scottish
- UK Parliament: Stirling and Strathallan
- Scottish Parliament: Stirling

Buchlyvie is a village in the Stirling council area of Scotland. It is situated 14 miles (23 km) west of Stirling and 18 miles (29 km) north of Glasgow. Lying within the Carse of Forth, to the north is Flanders Moss and to the south are the Campsie Fells. The village lies on the A811, which follows the line of an eighteenth-century military road between Stirling and Balloch. According to the 2001 census the village's population was 479.

== History ==
=== Railways ===
Buchlyvie Junction formed the intersection of the Forth and Clyde Junction Railway, which linked Stirling and Balloch, and the Strathendrick and Aberfoyle Railway which ran north to Aberfoyle. The station closed in 1951.

=== The Baron O' Buchlyvie ===
Buchlyvie was granted Burgh of Barony status in 1672.The Baron O' Buchlyvie was born in 1900 at Woodend Farm, Buchlyvie. The famous Clydesdale Horse was sold in 1902. The case went to the House of Lords, to determine ownership of the horse. The owners were forced to sell the horse at auction in Balfron 1911 for £9,500, a record for any horse at the time.

The Baron had sired generations of Clydesdale horses, and was highly prized in America. In 1914, the Baron's leg was broken by a kick from a mare and was put down. He was buried, but his skeleton was later uncovered and displayed in the Kelvingrove Art Gallery and Museum in the West End of Glasgow.

== Facilities ==
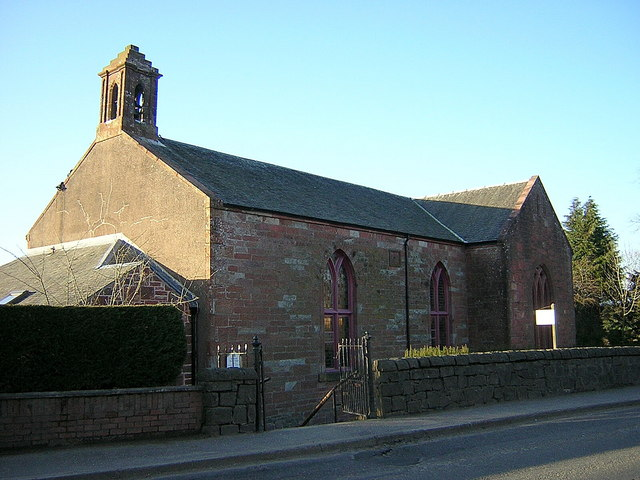
The Parish Kirk on Main Street, Buchlyvie

Buchlyvie is in the catchment area for Balfron High School - the local high school situated in the nearby village of Balfron. The local primary school is situated on Station Road in Buchlyvie and has a shared head teacher with the nearby village of Fintry. Recently refurbished, the building now also houses the Buchlyvie Medical Centre. The village of Buchlyvie had two churches, a United Free Church of Scotland in the north of the village on Station Road (now closed) and a Church of Scotland in the south east of the village on the Main Street.

== Sports ==
The village has a local football team, Buchlyvie United who play in the Forth and Endrick Football League, and have done so since the league's inception in 1910. The local rugby team is Strathendrick RFC who play their home games in the nearby village of Fintry. Buchlyvie Primary School also has a team for football and netball and they play against several teams which are Drymen, Balfron, Kippen, Fintry and Gargunnock.
