= Kincardine-in-Menteith =

Coordinates: 56.167°N 4.044°W

Kincardine
- Area: 16 sq mi (41 km^{2})
- Population: 1,148 (2011)
  - Density: 72/sq mi (28/km^{2})
- Civil parish: Kincardine
- Community council: Thornhill and Blairdrummond
- Council area: Stirling
- Lieutenancy area: Perthshire
- Country: Scotland
- Sovereign state: United Kingdom
- Post town: Stirling
- Postcode district: FK9
- Police: Scotland
- Fire: Scottish
- Ambulance: Scottish
- UK Parliament: Stirling
- Scottish Parliament: Stirling

Kincardine is a civil parish in the Scottish council area of Stirling and the former county of Perthshire in the historic district of Menteith.

It lies between the River Teith and River Forth and contains the villages of Blair Drummond and Thornhill. The parish church is 2 miles south-west of Doune.

In 1877, the Thornhill part of the parish was erected into a separate parish for ecclesiastic (but not civil) purposes.

At the last census (2011), the population of the civil parish was 1,148. The area of the parish is 10,207 acres. Kincardine parish is also a Community Council area under the name Thornhill and Blairdrummond.
