= M9 motorway =

M9 highway or M9 motorway may refer to:

- M9 motorway (Ireland)
- M-9 motorway (Pakistan)
- M9 highway (Russia)
- M9 motorway (Scotland)
