= Forth and Endrick Football League =

- Founded: 1910
- Country: Scotland
- Divisions: 1
- Number of clubs: 10
- Current champions: Balfron Rovers FC . (2025)
- Website: https://fewfa.co.uk/

The Forth and Endrick Football Association (commonly known as the Forth and Endrick League) is a welfare football league, operating in the central belt of Scotland.

== History ==
Formed in 1910, the league is competed for during the summer months, and has operated continuously apart from the years 1915 to 1920 (the First World War) and 1940 to 1945 during the Second World War. In addition to the league competition instituted in 1912 and 1913 and re-established in 1920, the member clubs take part in the Association's cup competitions. These are the Cameron Cup (first competed in 1910), the MacGregor Ferguson Cup (first competed in 1972), the Iain Telfer Cup (first competed in 1979) and the Margaret White Trophy (first competed in 1982). Since 1974 the Salmon Leap Inn Trophy has been awarded to the club which scores the highest number of goals in the league competition. The Association additionally makes two awards annually to individual players - the Stirling Observer Trophy to the player voted Player of the Year and the William Gordon Memorial Cup to the player voted Man of the Match in the Cameron Cup Final.

== Members clubs ==
=== Current clubs ===
Club	Founded
Aberfoyle Rob Roy F.C.	1910
Balfron Rovers F.C.	1930
Blanefield Thistle F.C.	1947
Buchlyvie United F.C.	1910
Deanston F.C.	1952
Drymen United F.C.	1910
Gargunnock F.C.	1956
Gartocharn F.C.	1957
Killearn F.C.	1910
Kippen F.C.	1910

=== Former clubs ===
Club	Years active
Aberfoyle United F.C.	1925–1926
Ballikinrain F.C.	1910
Fintry F.C.	1911–2016
Thornhill F.C.	1926–2021
Lochard United F.C.	1930–1932
Port United F.C.	1933–1937
Vale of Endrick F.C.	1910–1925
Balfron High School FPs	1924–1933
Duntreath F.C.	1924–1925
Blair Drummond F.C.	1950–1961
Gartmore F.C.	1910–1995
