= Charles Mackinnon Douglas =

Scottish philosopher

Charles Mackinnon Douglas CB DL MP (2 October 1865 – 3 February 1924) was a Scottish philosopher, agriculturist and Member of Parliament who represented North West Lanarkshire from 1899 to 1906.

== Education and academia ==
Douglas was born in Edinburgh, and was educated at Edinburgh Academy, the University of Edinburgh and the University of Freiburg. He graduated the University of Edinburgh with first-class honours in philosophy in 1892 and later earned a doctorate from the same institution. He lectured at the university on moral philosophy for seven years. He was the author of studies of English philosopher John Stuart Mill, and co-authored a treatise with Dutch philosopher Cornelis Tiele.

== Career ==
He won a seat in Parliament at a by-election in 1899, was re-elected in 1900, but lost in 1906. Unhappy with the Liberal government, he stood unsuccessfully as a Unionist in South Lanarkshire in December 1910.

During the First World War, he was Chairman of the Lanarkshire Territorial Force Association. He was made a Companion of the Order of the Bath in the 1918 New Year Honours.

He was chairman of the Scottish Council of Agriculture, chairman of directors of the Highland and Agricultural Society of Scotland and president of the Scottish Agricultural Organization Society and Scottish Chamber of Agriculture. In 1919, he was a member of a Royal Commission on agriculture in Great Britain.

== Personal life ==
In 1895, he married Anne Isabel (née Tod). He died in Lesmahagow in 1924.

Parliament of the United Kingdom
Preceded by John Goundry Holburn	Member of Parliament for North West Lanarkshire; 1899–1906	Succeeded by William Mitchell-Thomson
