= Thornhill, Stirling =

Coordinates: 56.173°N 4.152°W

Thornhill: Scottish Gaelic: Cnoc na Driseig
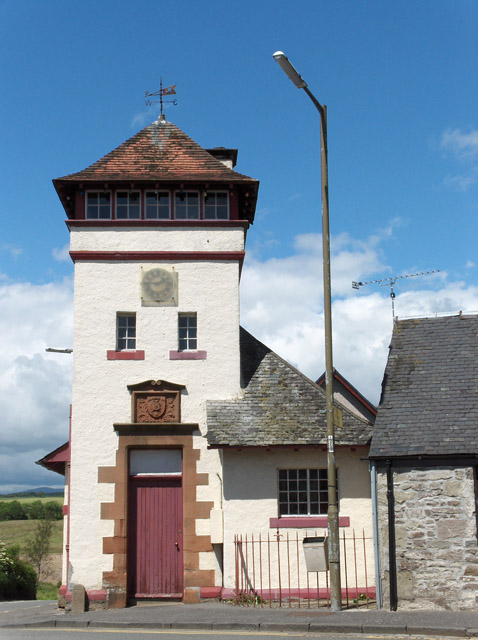
- Lodge Blairhoyle, in Thornhill, is Britain's smallest purpose-built Masonic Lodge

- Location within the Stirling council area
- Population: 600 (2020)
- OS grid reference: NS664998
- Civil parish: Kincardine
- Council area: Stirling
- Lieutenancy area: Stirling and Falkirk
- Country: Scotland
- Sovereign state: United Kingdom
- Post town: Stirling
- Postcode district: FK8
- Dialling code: 01786
- Police: Scotland
- Fire: Scottish
- Ambulance: Scottish
- UK Parliament: Stirling and Strathallan
- Scottish Parliament: Stirling

Thornhill (Scottish Gaelic: Cnoc na Driseig) is a village in the Scottish council area of Stirling. It lies 14 miles (23 kilometres) northwest of Stirling itself, south of Callander, east of Aberfoyle and west of Doune.

Historically part of Perthshire, the village is in the civil parish of Kincardine and the church parish of Norrieston (separated ecclesiastically from Kincardine in 1877), named from the much earlier village of Norrieston, which lay a little to the east of Thornhill. It is situated on a slight elevation at the western edge of the Carse of Stirling, an area of flat agricultural land which forms the upper part of the floodplain of the River Forth. Much of the land within the Carse was bogland until the late 18th century when concerted efforts were made to clear away the peat and expose the fertile clay soil below. Flanders Moss, the largest remaining area of lowland bog in Scotland and a site of special scientific interest, lies to the south west.

The village lies on a traditional east–west route from Dunblane to Aberfoyle which passes the Old Post Cottage and was planned and founded at the end of the seventeenth century.

The 2001 census population for the area covered by the Thornhill and Blairdrummond Community Council is 1,109.

Thornhill has one primary school which in the session 2009-2010 had 62 pupils from the village and surrounding area.

The ruins of a possible Iron Age broch lie at Boquhapple about one mile (1.5 kilometres) north of Thornhill. A mound of rubble about 30 metres (100 ft) in diameter and the earthworks are all that remain today.

The name Thornhill is supposedly derived from the thorn covered ridge on which the village is situated. Thornhill was founded as an early planned village in 1696 and most buildings date from the 18th, 19th and 20th century.

It is believed to have the smallest Masonic Lodge in Scotland.

Thornhill has a community hall with a main hall, meeting rooms, kitchen, changing rooms with showers and parking. The hall is available for the use of locals and other groups.

Thornhill has one pub, The Lion and Unicorn, located on Main Street. It is thought to predate the founding of the village, starting life as a drovers' inn, possibly as early as 1635.

== Notable person ==
- Lauren Mayberry, lead singer in the electronic band Chvrches.
