= List of listed buildings in Manor, Scottish Borders =

This is a list of listed buildings in the parish of Manor in the Scottish Borders, Scotland.

== List ==
Name	Location	Date Listed	Grid Ref. (Note: Sometimes known as OSGB36, the grid reference (where provided) is based on the British national grid reference system used by the Ordnance Survey. • "Guide to National Grid". Ordnance Survey. • "Get-a-map". Ordnance Survey.)	Geo-coordinates	Notes	LB Number (Note: Historic Environment Scotland assign a unique alphanumeric identifier to each designated site in Scotland, for listed buildings this always begins with "LB", for example "LB12345".)	Image
Farm Buildings, Haswellsykes				55°38′27″N 3°15′37″W	Category C(S)	15349	Upload Photo
Kirkton Manor Smithy				55°37′43″N 3°14′28″W	Category B	15366	Upload Photo
Old Manor Brig. Over Manor Water				55°38′31″N 3°13′23″W	Category B	15367	Upload Photo
Glenternie				55°36′59″N 3°15′15″W	Category B	15351	Upload Photo
Kirkton House (Former Manse)				55°37′45″N 3°14′21″W	Category B	15360	Upload Photo
Barns House				55°38′26″N 3°14′48″W	Category B	15361	Upload Photo
Statue, Hallyards				55°37′32″N 3°14′45″W	Category B	15370	Upload Photo
Lodge, Glenternie				55°37′10″N 3°15′11″W	Category C(S)	15352	Upload Photo
Castlehill Tower				55°36′23″N 3°14′56″W	Category B	15353	Upload Photo
Hallmanor				55°36′10″N 3°15′21″W	Category C(S)	15355	Upload Photo
Hallyards				55°37′31″N 3°14′47″W	Category B	15368	Upload Photo
Lodge, Hallyards				55°37′37″N 3°14′41″W	Category C(S)	15371	Upload Photo
Haswellsykes				55°38′27″N 3°15′35″W	Category B	15348	Upload Photo
Black Dwarf's Cottage				55°37′15″N 3°15′10″W	Category B	15350	Upload Photo
Manor Parish Church				55°37′45″N 3°14′24″W	Category C(S)	15359	Upload Photo
Sundial, Hallyards				55°37′32″N 3°14′49″W	Category B	15369	Upload Photo
Manor Bridge Over River Tweed				55°38′34″N 3°13′34″W	Category B	19743	Upload Photo
Posso Tower				55°35′10″N 3°16′14″W	Category B	15354	Upload Photo
Barns Tower				55°38′22″N 3°14′54″W	Category B	15363	Upload Photo
Barns, Garden Walls And Gateways				55°38′17″N 3°14′54″W	Category C(S)	15364	Upload Photo
Kirkton Manor Mill				55°37′43″N 3°14′24″W	Category B	15365	Upload Photo
Barns Stables				55°38′21″N 3°14′54″W	Category A	15362	Upload Photo

== Key ==
The scheme for classifying buildings in Scotland is:

- Category A: "buildings of national or international importance, either architectural or historic; or fine, little-altered examples of some particular period, style or building type."
- Category B: "buildings of regional or more than local importance; or major examples of some particular period, style or building type, which may have been altered."
- Category C: "buildings of local importance; lesser examples of any period, style, or building type, as originally constructed or moderately altered; and simple traditional buildings which group well with other listed buildings."

In March 2016 there were 47,288 listed buildings in Scotland. Of these, 8% were Category A, and 50% were Category B, with the remaining 42% being Category C.
