= Patrick Harrison =

Scottish rugby union player

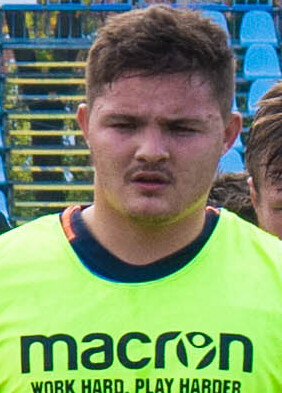
- Harrison with Edinburgh Rugby in 2022
- Born: 20 June 2002 (age 24) West Linton, Peeblesshire, Scotland
- Height: 1.83 m (6 ft 0 in)
- Weight: 110 kg (240 lb; 17 st 5 lb)
- School: Peebles High School

Rugby union career
- Position: Hooker
- Current team: Edinburgh Rugby
Amateur team(s)
Years	Team	Apps	(Points)
2019-2020	Peebles RFC		
Senior career
Years	Team	Apps	(Points)
2021–	Edinburgh Rugby	15	(20)
2021	→ Wasps (loan)	1	(0)
2022	→ London Irish (loan)	2	(5)
- Correct as of 26 April 2023
International career
Years	Team	Apps	(Points)
2021–2022	Scotland U20	8	(15)
2024	Scotland	3	(5)
- Correct as of 25 November 2024

Patrick "Paddy" Harrison (born 20 June 2002) is a Scottish rugby union player who currently plays as a hooker for Edinburgh Rugby and the Scotland national team.

== Early life ==
Harrison was born on 20 June 2002 in the village of West Linton in Peeblesshire, Scotland, 16 miles (26 km) to the southwest of Edinburgh. He was raised on a farm in the village and is the youngest of four brothers.

Harrison attended Peebles High School and played for the town's rugby team.

== Rugby union career ==
=== Professional career ===
Harrison signed for the academy of his boyhood club, Edinburgh Rugby, in June 2020. He made his Pro14 debut in the rearranged Round 7 of the 2020–21 Pro14 against the Dragons, coming on as a replacement. Aged just 18 on his debut, he is currently the club's fourth-youngest debutant of all time.

He joined London Irish on a short-term loan on the 20 September 2022.

=== International career ===
In June 2024, Harrison was called up to the senior Scotland squad for the first time, in preparation for a tour of the Americas.

He made his Scotland debut as a substitute in a win against Chile, in Santiago on 20 July 2024. In his second appearance a week later, he again came off the bench and scored his first international try in a 19-31 victory against Uruguay in Montevideo.

In November 2024, Harrison was handed his first Scotland start in a 59-21 win against Portugal at Murrayfield.
