= Catherine Maxwell Stuart, 21st Lady of Traquair =

Scottish landowner and socialist

The Much Honoured Lady of Traquair

Lord Lieutenant of Tweeddale
- Incumbent
- Assumed office 28 August 2024
- Monarch: Charles III
- Preceded by: Sir Hew Strachan

Personal details
- Born: Catherine Margaret Mary Maxwell Stuart; 16 November 1964 (age 61) Peebles, Scottish Borders, Scotland
- Spouse(s): John Grey (m. 1995; died 1998) Mark Muller (m. 1999)
- Children: 3
- Parent(s): Peter Maxwell Stuart; Flora Carr-Saunders
- Relatives: Clan Stewart
- Education: Peebles High School
- Alma mater: London School of Economics
- Occupation: landowner, hotelier, brewer, politician, writer

Catherine Margaret Mary Maxwell Stuart, 21st Lady of Traquair (born 16 November 1964) is a Scottish landowner, politician, hotelier, brewer, and writer. She is the first female Laird of Traquair and, at the time she succeeded her father in 1990, she was the only female laird in Scotland. She took over the management of the lairdship from her mother in 1999, which includes a bed and breakfast and ancient brewery. A lifelong socialist, Maxwell Stuart ran for public office four times as a Labour Party candidate, including in the 2003 Scottish Parliament election and the 2007 Scottish Parliament election.

== Early life and family ==
Maxwell Stuart was born in 1964 to Captain Peter D'Arcy Joseph Maxwell Stuart, 20th Laird of Traquair and Flora Mary Carr-Saunders Maxwell Stuart, Lady of Traquair. As a member of a recusant family, she was raised in the Roman Catholic faith. Her father was an officer in the British Indian Army and a managing director at Vickers. Maxwell Stuart's maternal grandfather was Sir Alexander Carr-Saunders. She is a great-great-granddaughter of William Constable-Maxwell, 10th Lord Herries of Terregles.

A member of the Clan Stewart and a descendant of the Clan Maxwell, Maxwell Stuart is a relative of the House of Stuart and descends from the first laird in the female line through Henry Constable Maxwell Stuart. She is also a descendant of Mary, Queen of Scots. Maxwell Stuart grew up at Traquair House, her family's estate in the Scottish Borders. She was educated at Traquair Primary School and Peebles High School in Peeblesshire.

== Lairdship and career ==
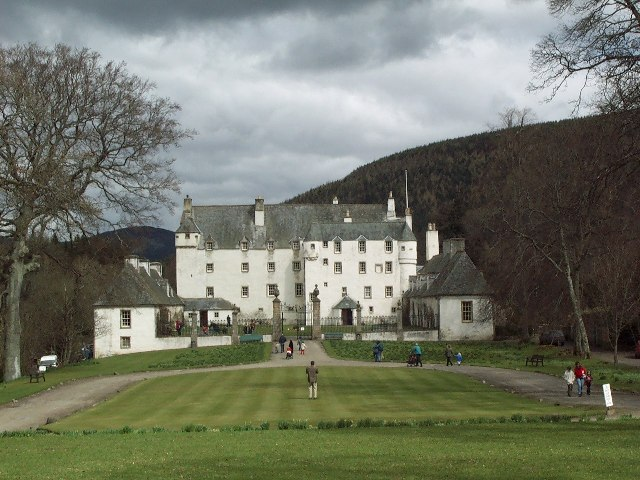
Traquair, Maxwell Stuart's estate in the Scottish Borders

In 1999, Maxwell Stuart took over the management of the Traquair estate from her mother, who had taken over after the death of the twentieth laird in 1990. Prior to her return to Scotland, she was working as a teacher in South America. At the time she inherited, she was the only female Laird in Scotland and the first female laird of Traquair. As a Scottish Laird, she is entitled to the old style of address of The Much Honoured and the title "Lady of Traquair". Traquair is the oldest continually inhabited stately home in Scotland. The castle was given to James Stuart, 1st Laird of Traquair, who was an illegitimate son of James Stewart, 1st Earl of Buchan and a cousin of James III of Scotland, in 1491. Maxwell Stuart operates a bed and breakfast and a brewery at the castle, and works as a tour guide at the estate. She also hosts weddings, formal events, and summer festivities at Traquair. She owns the house in partnership with a charitable trust.

A socialist, in 1999 Maxwell Stuart ran as a Labour Party candidate in a local government election, representing Innerleithen and Walkerburn, for the Scottish Borders Council. She lost by ninety votes. In 2001 she ran as a Labour candidate for Roxburgh and Berwickshire in the general election. Her platform included the construction of a new railway line, tackling crime, raising the minimum wage, and increasing the number of jobs in the Scottish Borders. She ran in the 2003 Scottish Parliament election and the 2007 Scottish Parliament election as a Labour candidate for Tweeddale, Ettrick, and Lauderdale.

In 2016, Maxwell Stuart accepted the Four Star Gold Quality Assurance Award from VisitScotland on behalf of Traquair House. That same year, she was featured in a BBC documentary titled Lady Lairds, which followed women owners of castles and country houses.

She has written two books, All for Our Rightful King: Traquair's Jacobite Story, 1688–1842 and A Family Life Revealed: The Stuarts at Traquair 1491–1875.

In April 2021, she was featured on the Duchess podcast, where she was interviewed by Emma Manners, Duchess of Rutland.

In August 2024, Maxwell Stuart was appointed Lord Lieutenant of Tweeddale, succeeding Sir Hew Strachan.

== Personal life ==
Maxwell Stuart is a practising Catholic. The National Portrait Gallery holds a 1992 portrait of Stuart.

In 1995 she married fashion designer John Grey in a Catholic ceremony at Traquair's chapel. Her husband died in 1998 from cancer. In 1999 she married Mark Muller, a human rights lawyer. She met Muller in the 1980s while studying at the London School of Economics, and the two had been friends prior to their marriage. Muller was the Labour candidate for Windsor at the 2001 General Election. She has three children.

Honorary titles
Preceded by Sir Hew Strachan	Lord Lieutenant of Tweeddale; 2024–present	Succeeded by Incumbent
Baronage of Scotland
Preceded by Sir Alexander Carr-Saunders; Laird of Traquair	Baroness of Traquair; 1990–present	Succeeded by Incumbent
