= Castlehill Tower =

Ruined tower house in Scotland

Coordinates: 55.6058°N 3.2491°W

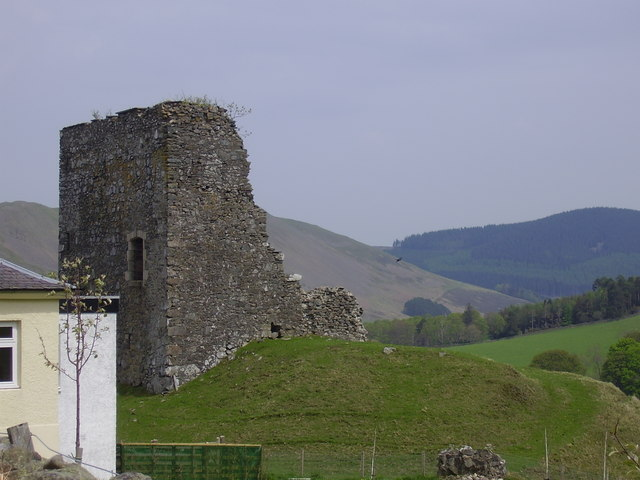
Castlehill Tower

Castlehill Tower, also known as Castle Hill of Manor, is a ruined oblong tower house dating from the end of the 15th century, situated in the parish of Manor, 1.5 miles (2.4 km) from Kirkton Manor, Scottish Borders, Scotland.

== History ==
The Lowis of Manor family built Castlehill Tower, which is first recorded in 1555, but it was subsequently sold in 1637 to Alexander Veitch in Nether Horsburgh, who passed it, in 1672, to George Baillie of Jerviswood in 1672. From 1703 to 1729 it was owned by William, first Earl of March. William Tweedie of Quarter seems to have owned it in 1838, but abandoned it two years later.

== Structure ==
Castlehill Tower, which stands on the west end of a rocky knoll on the left bank of the Manor Water, may have had three storeys and a garret, but now only parts of the ground and first floors remain. It measures 37 feet eight inches by 29 feet 9 inches. The basement walls are 6 or 7 feet thick. The entrance, which leads to a small lobby, was in the east wall. In the lobby is the staircase to the hall on the first floor. The stair also leads to a passage with access to the barrel-vaulted hall, and also to a turnpike stair at the north-west angle of the tower. At ground level there is evidence of latrine chutes, coming from garderobes on the upper floor.

There is a ditch, with an average width of 11 feet at the bottom, to the south, west and north-west. There is a bank on the counterscarp which may have continued on the north, where a road runs now, and along the steep east side. The sides of the knoll may have been scarped. There are traces of a stone wall on the north and east. The whole summit may have been enclosed.

Consolidation work in 1889 did not succeed entirely in the grounds of the tower.

The castle guarded a ford over the Manor Water.

It is a category B listed building.

== See also ==
- Castles in Great Britain and Ireland
- List of castles in Scotland
