= William Dickson (British Army officer) =

Brigadier General William Dickson of Kilbucho (1748–1815) was an 18th/19th-century commander of the British Army and Member of Parliament.

== Life ==
He was born on 3 June 1748 the son of Rev David Dickson of Kilbucho (1709-1780) and his wife, Anne Gillon (1712-1783), daughter of Alexander Gillon of Wallhouse, Linlithgow. His father was a descendant of John Dickson of Hartrie, through whom he had inherited Kilbucho Castle.

He joined the British Army as an ensign in the 4th Regiment of Foot in 1777, possibly seeing action in the American War of Independence. He was based in Saint Lucia in 1778 and on return to Britain was promoted to lieutenant in 1779. In 1782 he was promoted to the rank of captain and joined the 42nd Regiment of Foot (Black Watch) returning to the war in America. In 1783 he was posted with his regiment in Nova Scotia. They only returned to Britain in 1789.

He remained in the Black Watch for the rest of his Army career. He was promoted to major in 1795 and a few months later to Lt Colonel. He served in the Egyptian Campaign against Napoleon. In 1804 he became Brigadier General.

William had inherited Kilbucho Castle in 1780 and began a series of improvements to the gardens, following the fashion of the day. He extended and remodelled the castle, in the Georgian manner, renaming it Kilbucho Place.

In 1802, while still serving in the army he stood as a candidate for Linlithgow Burghs, where his in-laws lived. He was backed by the Duke of Buccleuch in the campaign against the standing Whig MP Lord Stopford. He won the seat. He appears to have been in the Tory minority which supported Pitt in various wartime political debates (probably due to his military background). He held the seat of Linlithgow Burghs until November 1806 when he stood down without contesting the seat.

In 1808 he was given the important position as Governor of Cork in the south of Ireland in place of Henry Skeffington, 3rd Earl of Massereene. He retired in 1811/2 and spent his final years in Edinburgh.

Dickson died in Edinburgh on 18 May 1815. His brother John inherited Kilbucho but chose to sell the estate.
