= Crooked David =

Crooked David may refer to:

- Dafydd Gam (c. 1380 – 1415), a Welsh medieval nobleman, prominent opponent of Owain Glyndŵr
- Black Dwarf (personage) (1740–1811), a Scottish dwarf, the inspiration for Sir Walter Scott's novel, The Black Dwarf
