= Black dwarf (disambiguation) =

Black Dwarf may refer to:

- Black Dwarf, the theoretical astronomical object.
- The Black Dwarf (novel), Walter Scott's 1816 book in the Tales of my Landlord, 1st series.
- Black Dwarf (personage) or David Ritchie (1740–1811), a Scottish dwarf and the basis for the title character in Sir Walter Scott's novel.
- The Black Dwarf (journal), Thomas Jonathan Wooler's satirical 19th century radical journal.
- The Black Dwarf (newspaper), a left-wing British journal of the 1960s, edited by Tariq Ali.
- "Black Dwarf", a song by the Swedish Doom Metal Band 'Candlemass' on their album Candlemass.
- Black Dwarf (comics), a fictional character in the Marvel Universe.

== See Also ==
- Red dwarf - astronomical object
- Red Dwarf - British science fiction comedy
