= Peebles High School, Peeblesshire =

Peebles High School
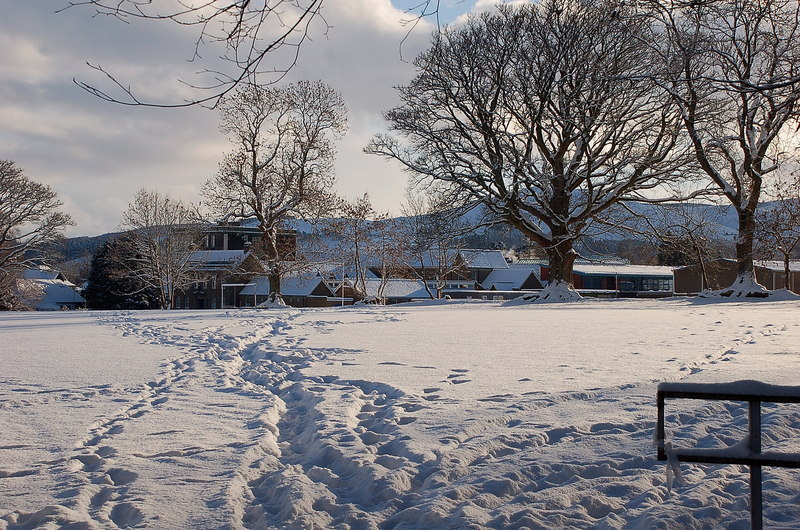

Location
- Springwood Road; Peebles, Peeblesshire (Scottish Borders), EH45 9HB; Scotland; 55°38′42″N 03°11′30″W

Information
- Type: Secondary school
- Motto: Mente Manu Corde
- Established: 1858
- Local authority: Scottish Borders Council
- Head teacher: Kevin Ryalls
- Age: 12 to 18
- Enrollment: 1420
- Houses: Cademuir, Dunrig, Meldon
- Colours: Red and green
- School years: S1-S6
- Website: www.peebleshighschool.com

Peebles High School is a state-run comprehensive school for girls and boys aged 11–18 (Note: In Scotland children typically start secondary school aged 12, however a significant minority may start at 11 if their birthday is within 6 months of the start of the academic year.) located in Peebles in the Scottish Borders. It was originally named Bonnington Park Academy in 1858. Since then, it has expanded and is now attended by 1,500 pupils from all over the Tweeddale area.

The school was expanded in 2000 when The Millennium Wing was added. This expansion meant a great increase in size and capacity including a Learning Resource Centre and entire business suite. A new sports centre was completed in 2014.

In 2013, the school was ranked 28th in Scotland for Higher exam passes.

The school was damaged severely by a serious fire on 28 November 2019, which burned down approximately a third of the school and forced its closure for several weeks.

== Curriculum ==
The school follows the standard Scottish curriculum with subjects ranging from Mathematics and English to newer subjects such as Business Management and Child Care.

== Sports ==
Rugby and Hockey are popular sports at the school. However, students are encouraged to participate in a wide range of other sports including football, netball, mountain biking, swimming and athletics.

== History of the School ==
=== Incipience ===
The very first origins of Peebles High School date as far back as 1464 when a "scule and sculmaster" were appointed. Two centuries later there is evidence of "the establishment of the English School and the Grammar School of Peebles on Tweed Green". More recent history suggests the most immediate origins of Peebles High School was in 1858 when a private school, known then as Bonnington Park Academy for boys, was established. A private school for girls called St Leonards existed around that time and was hosted within the Parish Church Manse.

By 1873 the roll of children in the local community totalled 538 between the ages of 5–13, 85% of whom were at school. To accommodate this increasing roll, an application was made to make the existing school a "Higher Class School" i.e. to teach beyond elementary level. In 1876 it was only one of 20 in Scotland to achieve this. Also in this year "young ladies" were finally allowed to enrol. This led to a change of name to" Peebles High School-Bonnington Park". Students came from all over the county. It was, however, a private school that consisted of a preparatory and upper school, the latter requiring an examination to permit a pupil to access.

=== 20th century ===
In 1901, there were about 100 students in the "upper part of the school" then known as "Peebles and County High School". The Education (Scotland) Act 1908 finally allowed grants to children, allowing them to remain in school. By 1910, the school was a single-storey building consisting of several rooms in a single corridor, where the science labs now exist.

By 1927, there were approximately 200 pupils in the school and 12 staff, however by 1935 the Preparation department was closed and pupils transferred to Kingsland and Halyrude. Lack of accommodation beyond the age of 14 at these schools meant that a decision was made to expand the Burgh and County School in 1936. The new addition to the school known as the "36 block" was completed in 1938, This now meant all pupils over the age of 12 were expected to attend. There were extensive sports fields around the school, allowing a wide access to sport.

The beginning of World War Two saw a large influx of evacuees to "safe" Peebles, adding six air raid shelters to the school playground and a necessity to turn playing fields into vegetable allotments. The Education Act 1947 saw the roll increase to 400, as students were now to remain at school until age 15. At this time there was also an increase of students remaining into the 6th year.

The next significant structural change, due to the pressure on accommodation and the leaving age increasing to age 16, was the "Tower, dining room and technical block". These were added at a cost of £4,430,000 in 1970. Even then Modern studies and History resided in Huts which remained until 1999. There were as many as 3 huts at Peebles High School at this time.

=== 21st century ===
Due to the aforementioned pressure for space, the Millennium Wing was built behind the 36 block. This modern building consisted of an innovative two-level development with an open and bright congregational space known as the atrium. By 2000, the school had over 80 teachers and in excess of 1000 pupils.

By 2014, in an effort to increase access to sport, the school led an extensive campaign to generate a new, state-of-the-art sports facility, funded in partnership with Scottish Borders Council and Sportscotland, costing £4.8m.

=== November 2019 fire and aftermath ===
On 28 November 2019, the additional needs, art and physical education departments were significantly damaged by a fire, with wilful fire raising being the reported cause. All staff and students were evacuated safely. The next morning, the fire was brought under control.

On 4 July 2022, the Scottish Borders Council approved the construction of a £46,000,000 school to replaced the damaged one. The new building was completed in November 2025, at a reported cost of £61 million.

== Notable alumni ==
- Calum Kerr, politician
- Tim Luckhurst, journalist and academic
- Catherine Maxwell Stuart, 21st Lady of Traquair, landowner, businesswoman, politician
- Chris O'Hare, athlete
- Scott Brash, showjumper
- Josh Landers, association football player (dropout)
- Patrick Harrison, rugby union player
- Murray Aiken, association football player
