= Chambers Institution =

Municipal Building in Peebles, Scotland

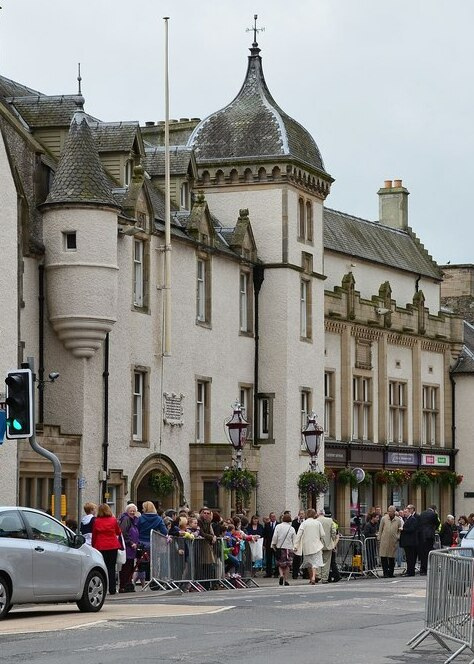
- Chambers Institution

- Shown in the Scottish Borders
- 55.6518°N 3.1893°W
- Location: High Street, Peebles

History
- Built: 1859

Site notes
- Architect: John Paris
- Architectural style: Scottish baronial style

Listed Building – Category A
- Official name: High Street, Chambers Institution
- Designated: 23 February 1971
- Reference no.: LB39180

The Chambers Institution is a municipal structure in the High Street in Peebles, Scotland. The structure, which was designed to accommodate a library, a museum, an art gallery and Peebles Burgh Hall, is a Category A listed building.

== History ==
The first municipal building in the town was a medieval tolbooth which stood on the south side of the Eddleston Water near the Bridgegate and which dated back to the 15th century. By the early 17th century, the tollbooth was in a dilapidated state. The second municipal building was a structure known as The Steeple which stood on the north side of the High Street adjacent to Cuddy Bridge and which was completed between 1488 and 1496: it served as the town jail and meeting place of the burgh council until the mid-18th century. This in turn was replaced by a third municipal building, the Peebles Town House, on the south side of the High Street, which was completed in 1753.

The fourth and current municipal building on the south side of the High Street started life as a domestic property in the 16th century. It belonged to the Cross Kirk and was known as the Dean's House before being acquired by John Hay, 1st Earl of Tweeddale in 1624. In 1653, it passed to John Hay, 1st Marquess of Tweeddale and, in 1687, it was inherited by William Douglas, 1st Duke of Queensberry who made it available as a lodging to his son, William Douglas, 1st Earl of March. After the building, known by this time as the Queensberry Lodging, had passed down the Queensberry line through much of the 18th century, William Douglas, 4th Duke of Queensberry sold it to the provost, Dr James Reid, in 1781. It then remained in the Reid family until it was acquired by the publisher, William Chambers, in 1857.

Over the next few years, Chambers remodelled the building and its grounds to provide facilities for the social improvement of the town. The remodelled structure was designed by John Paris in the Scottish baronial style, built with a stucco finish and was officially opened on 8 August 1859. The design involved an asymmetrical main frontage with six bays facing onto the High Street. The first bay was fenestrated with single windows on all three floors and was gabled; the second bay, which was recessed on the upper floors, was fenestrated by a five-light transomed window on the ground floor, by a single window on the first floor and by a dormer window on the second floor. The central section of three bays featured a pend and a large bay window on the ground floor: the section was fenestrated with single windows on the first floor and dormer windows on the second floor and featured a bartizan at the top left corner. The last bay, which was projected forward, took the form of a four-stage tower with an ogee-shaped roof. The pend led to a courtyard: it was bounded on the north side by the original building, which accommodated a library, on the west side by a new structure, which accommodated a museum and an art gallery, and on the south side by a new burgh hall.

Ownership of the complex passed to the burgh council in 1911. The burgh council then took up an offer by the Scottish-American, Andrew Carnegie, to finance a five-bay extension to the west. The extension was built to a design by George Washington Browne and completed in 1911. Fenestrated with cross-windows on the first floor and castellated along the roof, the extension incorporated shops on the ground floor and additional library space on the first floor. A memorial to commemorate the lives of local service personnel who died in the First World War, designed by Burnett Napier Henderson Orphoot in the form of a hexagonal pavilion with an ogee-shaped roof, was unveiled in the courtyard in 1922.

The burgh hall continued to serve as the meeting place of the burgh council for much of the 20th century, but ceased to be the local seat of government after the enlarged Tweeddale District Council was formed at the former County Hall in Rosetta Road in 1975. In 1990, a new room was opened in the museum to display friezes donated by William Chambers which reproduced sections of the Elgin Marbles, sculpted by Phidias and displayed in the British Museum, and the whole of the "Triumph of Alexander", sculpted by Bertel Thorvaldsen and displayed in the Quirinal Palace. Queen Elizabeth II visited the building to open the John Buchan Museum, a new part of the Chambers Institution, in July 2013.

Works of Art in the art gallery include a portrait by John A. Horsburgh of William Chambers, a portrait by Colvin Smith of the poet, Sir Walter Scott, and a portrait by Edward Arthur Walton of the industrialist, Sir Walter Thorburn.

== See also ==
- List of listed buildings in Peebles, Scottish Borders
- List of Category A listed buildings in the Scottish Borders
