= Hew Strachan =

British military historian and author

Sir Hew Strachan CVO DL FRSE FRHistS FBA
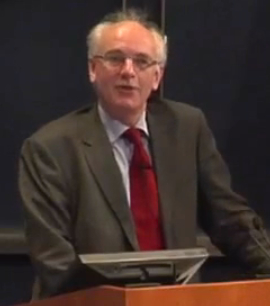
- Strachan in 2013
- Born: 1 September 1949 (age 77); Edinburgh, Scotland
- Occupations: Military historian, author
- Spouse: Pamela Symes
- Website: Official website

Sir Hew Francis Anthony Strachan, CVO, DL, FRSE, FRHistS, FBA (/strɔːn/ STRAWN; born 1 September 1949) is a British military historian, well known for his leadership in scholarly studies of the British Army and the history of the First World War. He is currently Emeritus Professor of International Relations at the University of St Andrews. Before that, Strachan was the Chichele Professor of the History of War at All Souls College, Oxford.

== Early life ==
Strachan was born in Edinburgh, Scotland. He was educated at Rugby School, then in 1968 was a merchant seaman for three months, working his passage around the world on ships of Ben Line Steamers Ltd. He then spent three years at Corpus Christi College, Cambridge, graduating BA in 1971 and proceeding to M.A. in 1975. In 1973, he joined a survey of antiquities in the Sudan.

== Career ==
In 1975, Strachan was elected a research fellow of Corpus Christi College, and in 1977–1978 was a senior lecturer in war studies at the Royal Military Academy Sandhurst. In 1978, he returned to his Cambridge college as a tutor.

He became admissions tutor and then senior tutor of Corpus Christi College, and in 1992 was elected a life fellow. He was Professor of Modern History at the University of Glasgow from 1992 to 2000, then migrated to Oxford as Chichele Professor of the History of War at All Souls.

He was director of the Oxford Programme on the Changing Character of War from 2004 to 2015, and published a series of important articles on strategy, as well as editing books which have arisen from the project.

He is a Fellow of the Royal Society of Edinburgh and the Royal Historical Society. He was appointed a deputy lieutenant of Tweeddale in 2006. He is a member of the Academic Advisory Panel of the Royal Air Force Centre for Air Power Studies. In addition, he is on the Chief of the Defence Staff's strategic advisory panel, the UK Defence Academy Advisory Board, and is an advisory fellow of the Barsanti Military History Center at the University of North Texas. He was on the council of the National Army Museum and is currently a trustee of the Imperial War Museum. In 2016, he became Patron of Western Front Association. He is a visiting professor of the Royal Norwegian Air Force Academy in Trondheim and in 2009 was the Sir Howard Kippenberger Professor at Victoria University Wellington. He sits on the advisory board of the Centre for War and Diplomacy at Lancaster University.

From 20 May 2014 to 28 August 2024, Strachan served as Lord Lieutenant of Tweeddale, in succession to Captain David Bingham Younger.

In 2015, he left Oxford to serve as professor of international relations at the University of St Andrews.

On 8th May 2025 he delivered a speech at the opening of The Russell Cawthorn Collection in Kelso Library on the role of the collection today. The collection is one of the largest collections of books on the First World War in the UK.

== Research ==
Strachan's early research and published work focussed on the history of the British Army, and he was awarded the Templer Medal for From Waterloo to Balaclava and the Westminster Medal for The Politics of the British Army. Commissioned by the Oxford University Press to write a history of the First World War to replace C. R. M. F. Cruttwell's one-volume A History of the Great War, 1914-1918, Strachan completed the first of three volumes, The First World War: Volume 1: To Arms in 2001 to wide acclaim and is acknowledged as one of the world's authorities on the subject. Accompanying the print publication of his one volume survey The First World War (2004) was a multi-part documentary series for television entitled The First World War, with some episodes being titled after the chapters in the written work. This set was also released on DVD by Image Entertainment.

According to Jonathan Boff, he became "the most influential British historian of the First World War of his generation." He broke through traditional intra-disciplinary boundaries and national borders. He tirelessly encouraged others, both inside academia and out. His impact produces histories of the Great War that are global and multi-dimensional, while rooted in the detail of military operations. The results exemplify the new military historiography.

Strachan is editor of the Great Battles series published by Oxford University Press.

== Views ==
In January 2014, Strachan told The Daily Beast that President Barack Obama's failures in Afghanistan and Syria have shown that he is "chronically incapable" of military strategy. He said, "Bush may have had totally fanciful political objectives in terms of trying to fight a global War on Terror, which was inherently astrategic, but at least he had a clear sense of what he wanted to do in the world. Obama has no sense of what he wants to do in the world."

== Awards and honours ==
In 2005 Strachan was bestowed with the Honorary degree of Doctor of the University (D.Univ) from the University of Paisley. He was knighted in the 2013 New Years Honours List for services to the Ministry of Defence. In 2016, he won the Pritzker Literature Award for Lifetime Achievement in Military Writing. He was appointed as the Lord Lieutenant of Tweeddale on 7 June 2014 by HM Queen Elizabeth II.

In July 2017, Strachan was elected a Fellow of the British Academy (FBA), the United Kingdom's national academy for the humanities and social sciences.

In 2018, Strachan received the Morison Prize from The Society for Military History.

In 2023, he was named a Society for Army Historical Research Fellow.

== Selected publications ==
- British Military Uniforms, 1768–1796 (Arms and Armour, 1975)
- History of the Cambridge University Officers Training Corps (1976) ISBN 0-85936-059-8 OCLC 2647367
- European Armies and the Conduct of War (London, 1983) ISBN 0-415-07863-6
- Wellington's Legacy: The Reform of the British Army 1830–54 (Manchester, 1984) ISBN 0-7190-0994-4
- From Waterloo to Balaclava: Tactics, Technology and the British Army (Cambridge, 1985) ISBN 0-521-30439-3
- The Politics of the British Army (Oxford, 1997) ISBN 0-19-820670-4
- The Oxford Illustrated History of the First World War (ed.) (Oxford, 1998) ISBN 0-19-820614-3
- The First World War: Volume 1: To Arms (Oxford, 2001) ISBN 0-19-926191-1 (first of an expected three volume history)
- Military Lives Oxford: Oxford University Press, 2002. ISBN 0-19-860532-3
- The First World War: A New Illustrated History (Simon & Schuster, 2003)
- The First World War (Viking, 2004) ISBN 0-670-03295-6 (single volume survey of the war)
- The First World War in Africa (Oxford, 2004) ISBN 0199257280
- German Strategy in the First World War in Wolfgang Elz and Sönke Neitzel: Internationale Beziehungen im 19. und 20. Jahrhundert, pp. 127–144 (2003) ISBN 3-506-70140-1
- Clausewitz's On War: a Biography (Atlantic Monthly Press 2007) ISBN 0-87113-956-1.
- with Holger Afflerbach: How Fighting Ends. A History of Surrender. Oxford University Press, Oxford/New York 2012, ISBN 978-0-19-969362-7.
- The Direction of War: Contemporary Strategy in Historical Perspective 2013. ISBN 1-107-04785-4 OCLC 852957790
- British Generals in Blair's Wars, eds. Jonathan Bailey, Richard Iron and Hew Strachan (Ashgate Publishing, 2013).

Prefaces :

- Flesh and Steel During the Great War: The Transformation of the French Army and the Invention of Modern Warfare, Michel Goya (Pen and Sword Military, 2018) - ISBN 978-1473886964
- A Military History of Scotland, eds. Edward M. Spiers, Jeremy Crang, Matthew Strickland ( 2013). ISBN 978-0748633357

== Media ==
- Channel 4 DVD: The First World War – The Complete Series OCLC: 63265523 (region 1), 883640397 (region 4) ASIN: B0009S2K9C (based on his book)

== See also ==
- The First World War (TV series)

Honorary titles
Preceded by Sir David Younger	Lord Lieutenant of Tweeddale; 7 June 2014–28 August 2024	Succeeded by The Lady of Traquair
