= David Younger (British Army officer) =

British public servant (1939–2024)

Captain Sir John David Bingham Younger KCVO (20 May 1939 – 14 June 2024) was a British Army officer and business man who served as the Lord Lieutenant of Tweeddale from 1994 to 2014. He retired on reaching the age of seventy-five.

Born on 20 May 1939, Younger was educated at Eton and the Royal Military Academy Sandhurst. He was commissioned into the Argyll and Sutherland Highlanders in 1959 and served in Borneo and Singapore before joining the Directorate of Military Operations at the Ministry of Defence in 1967. He retired from the Army in 1969 and was an executive with Scottish and Newcastle Breweries from 1969 to 1979 before becoming one of the founding partners of the Broughton Brewery in 1979.

In 1969, he became a member of the Royal Company of Archers, the monarch's Bodyguard for Scotland, and was its Secretary from 1993 to 2007. He was vice-president of the Royal Highland and Agricultural Society of Scotland in 1994, and became Vice-Lord Lieutenant of Tweeddale in 1992, before becoming Lord Lieutenant in 1994.

Younger died at the age of 85 on 14 June 2024, after suffering from dementia and cancer.

Honorary titles
Preceded by Aidan Sprot	Lord Lieutenant of Tweeddale; 1994–2014	Succeeded by Sir Hew Strachan
