= Peebles Town House =

Municipal building in Peebles, Scotland

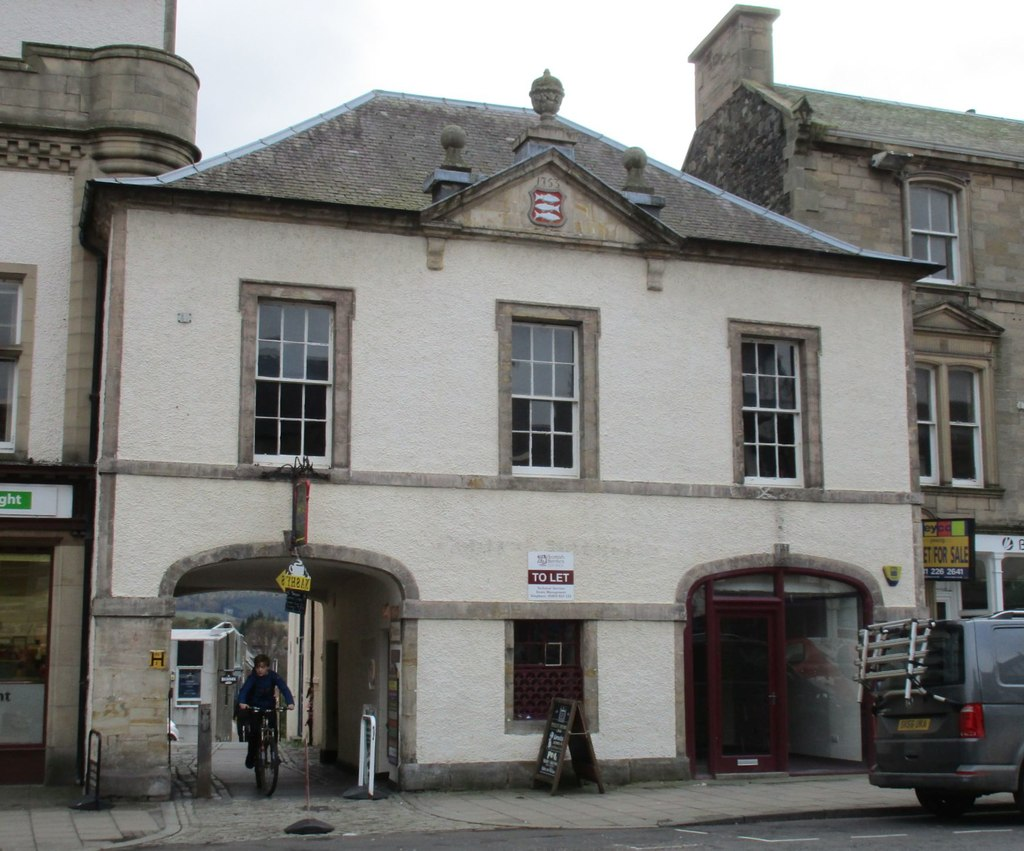
- The building in 2017

- Shown in the Scottish Borders
- 55.6516°N 3.1898°W
- Location: High Street, Peebles

History
- Built: 1753

Site notes
- Architectural style: Neoclassical style

Listed Building – Category A
- Official name: High Street, Town House
- Designated: 23 February 1971
- Reference no.: LB39188

Peebles Town House is a former municipal building in the High Street in Peebles, Scotland. The building, which was the meeting place of the burgh council in the 19th century but is now in retail use, is a Category A listed building.

== History ==
The first municipal building in the town was a medieval tolbooth which stood on the south side of the Eddleston Water near the Bridgegate and which dated back to the 15th century. By the early 17th century, the tollbooth was in a dilapidated state. The second municipal building was a structure known as The Steeple which stood on the north side of the High Street adjacent to Cuddy Bridge and which was completed between 1488 and 1496: it served as the town jail and meeting place of the burgh council until the mid-18th century.

The site for the town house, the third municipal building, was on the south side of the High Street. It was designed in the neoclassical style, built in brick with cream harling and stone finishings and was completed in 1753. The design involved a symmetrical main frontage of three bays facing into the High Street. On the ground floor, there were pends with stone surrounds in the outer bays and there was a small square window with a stone surround in the central bay. The first floor was fenestrated by sash windows with stone surrounds and, at roof level there was a pediment above the central bay with the burgh coat of arms, in reverse, the tympanum. Internally, the principal room was the council chamber on the first floor. A single-storey corn exchange was erected behind the town house in 1860, but its use declined significantly in the wake of the great depression of British agriculture in the late 19th century.

The town house ceased to be the local seat of government when the burgh council acquired the Chambers Institution in 1911. The town house, with its two pends, was ideally placed for use as a fire station, and it remained in that use until the fire service relocated to Caledonian Road in 1965. The building was then converted for retail use: the right-hand pend has since been enclosed by glass and the space behind it is currently being used as a sweet shop, known as Mr McGeever's Sweet Store.

== See also ==
- List of listed buildings in Peebles, Scottish Borders
- List of Category A listed buildings in the Scottish Borders
