= Manor, Scottish Borders =

Coordinates: 55.629286°N 3.2401353°W

Manor
- Location within the Scottish Borders
- Population: 149
- OS grid reference: NT220379
- Council area: Scottish Borders
- Lieutenancy area: Tweeddale
- Country: Scotland
- Sovereign state: United Kingdom
- Post town: Peebles
- Postcode district: EH45
- Dialling code: 01721
- Police: Scotland
- Fire: Scottish
- Ambulance: Scottish
- UK Parliament: Dumfriesshire, Clydesdale and Tweeddale
- Scottish Parliament: Midlothian South, Tweeddale and Lauderdale

Manor is a parish in Peeblesshire in the Scottish Borders, whose church lies on the west bank of Manor Water 3 miles south-west of Peebles.

The parish consists of the valley of Manor Water, a tributary of the River Tweed and extends about 9 miles north to south and about 3 miles wide. It is bound on the north-east by Peebles, on the south by Yarrow (Selkirkshire), on the south-west by Drumelzier and on the west and north-west by Stobo.

The name was originally Manner but this has been gradually supplanted by the form Manor.

The present church building, which lies at the north end of the valley, was erected in 1874, but the bell rung before every service, is inscribed 'In honore Santi Gordiani MCCCCLXXVIII' and is one of the oldest bells in Scotland. There is also a Pewter baptismal basin inscribed 'Manner Kirk 1703'.

The civil parish of Manor is in the Manor, Stobo and Lyne Community Council area.

The civil parish has a population of 149 (in 2011) and its area is 16,628 acres.

== Notable residents and former residents ==
- David Ritchie, Original for the title character of 'The Black Dwarf', by Sir Walter Scott, as described in the Introduction to The Black Dwarf.
- Sir James Nasmyth, 2nd Baronet, on whose land David Ritchie settled.
