= County Buildings, Peebles =

County building in Peebles, Scotland

County Hall, Peebles
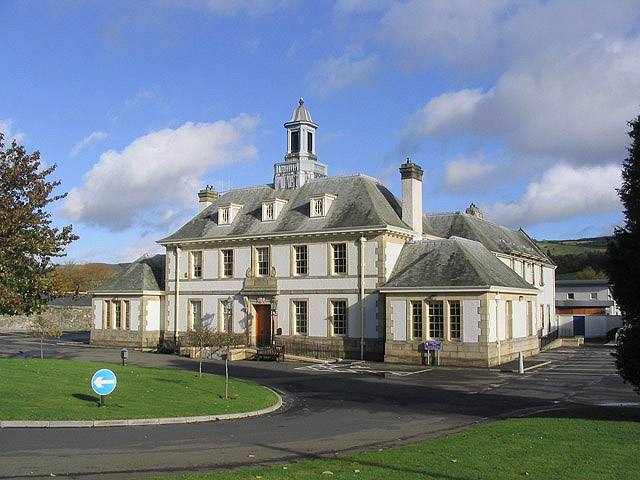
- County Hall, Peebles

- Shown in the Scottish Borders
- 55.6571°N 3.1966°W
- Location: Rosetta Road, Peebles

History
- Built: 1935

Site notes
- Architect: Peddie and Todd
- Architectural style: Baroque style

Listed Building – Category B
- Official name: Rosetta Road, Tweeddale District Council Offices, with Gatepiers, Boundary Walls and Lamp Standards
- Designated: 5 August 1993
- Reference no.: LB39256

County Hall is a municipal structure in Rosetta Road in Peebles, Scotland. The building, which was the meeting place of Peeblesshire County Council, is a Category B listed building.

== History ==
The building has its origins in the Peebles Combination Poorhouse which was designed by William Lambie Moffat and completed in 1856. It was described at the time as a square ornamental building. The poorhouse served as military hospital for service personnel who had been wounded on the Western Front during the First World War and was then acquired by the Peeblesshire County Education Authority in 1921.

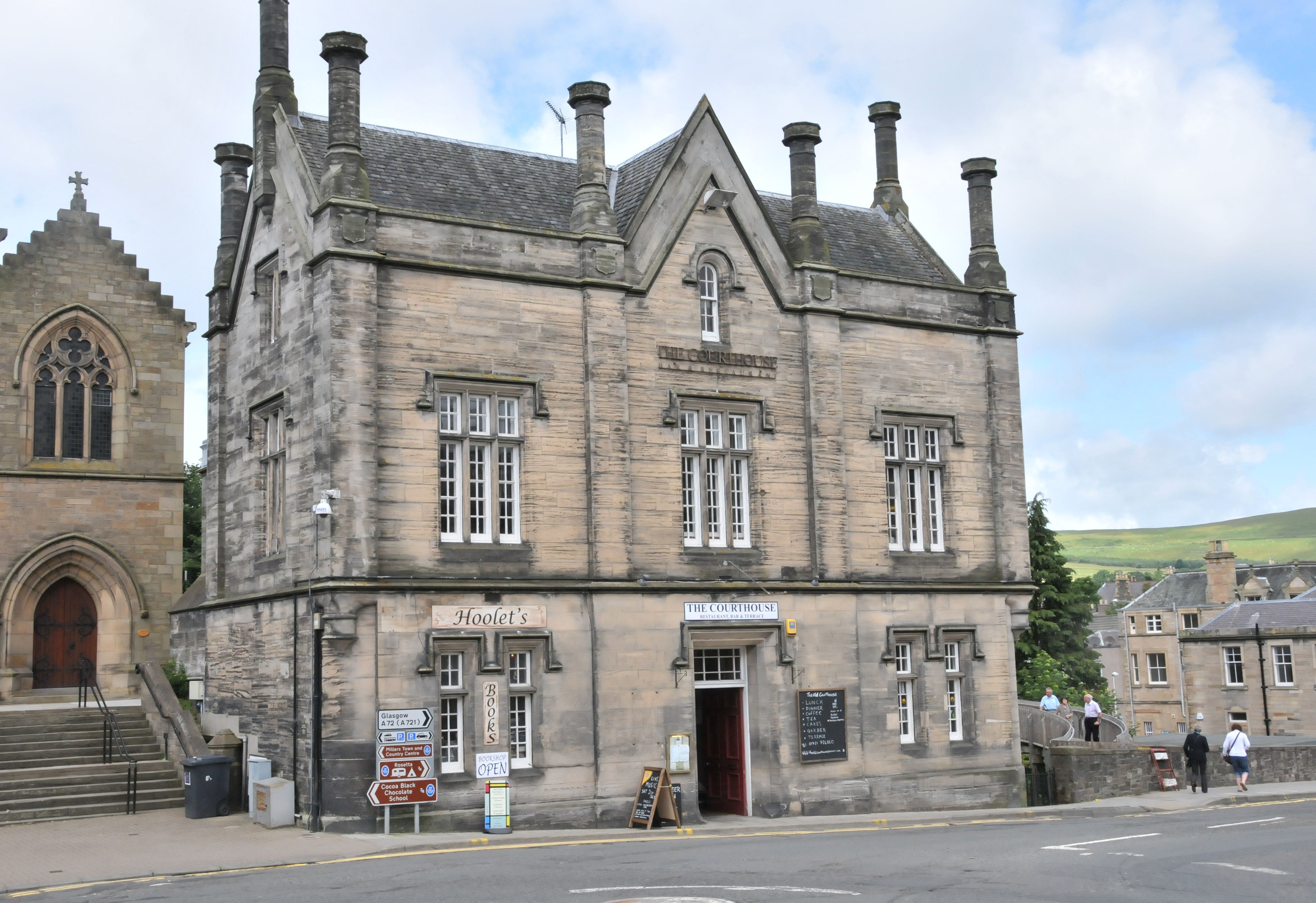
Old courthouse, High Street

Following the implementation of the Local Government (Scotland) Act 1889, which established county councils in every county, the new county leaders needed to identify offices for Peeblesshire County Council. The county council initially met at the courthouse in the High Street, which had been built between 1844 and 1848.

As the responsibilities of the council increased, it became necessary to find dedicated facilities and so the council leaders decided to remodel the old poorhouse at Rosetta Road. The remodelled structure was designed by Peddie and Todd in the Baroque style, built in ashlar stone with a harled finish and was completed in 1935.

The design involved a symmetrical main frontage with seven bays facing onto Rosetta Road with the end bays projected forward as single story pavilions; the central section of five bays featured a central doorway with an architrave flanked by brackets supporting a large cornice. The central section was fenestrated with single sash windows with architraves while the end pavilions were fenestrated by three-light sash windows. At roof level, there was a large octagonal cupola on a balustraded base with an ogee-shaped dome. Internally, the principal room was a wooden panelled council chamber.

Following the implementation of the Local Government (Scotland) Act 1973, the county council was abolished and the building became the offices and meeting place of Tweeddale District Council. In 1996, Scottish Borders Council became the unitary authority for the area and the building became the local area office for the enlarged council as well as the local police headquarters.

== See also ==
- List of listed buildings in Peebles, Scottish Borders
