= Robert Patten (Jacobite chaplain) =

Jacobite chaplain and historian

Robert Patten (fl. 1715) was a Jacobite chaplain and historian.

== Life ==
Patten was in 1704 curate at Penrith, Cumberland. When the Jacobite rising of 1715 took place he was in a similar capacity at Allendale in Northumberland. He led a party of keelmen to join the rising, and in crossing Rothbury Common met a number of Scotsmen on their way home to enlist for Pretender. He persuaded them to join him. On his arrival at Wooler he was warmly welcomed by General Thomas Forster and James Radclyffe, 3rd Earl of Derwentwater, and he was appointed Forster's chaplain. Marching with the expedition to Kelso, where the main body of the Jacobites joined them, he preached to the whole army a morale-boosting sermon, from Deuteronomy chapter 26, verse 17: "The right of the first-born is his".

Patten also took an active part in military service during the rising. When the expedition reached Penrith, he was, on account of his local knowledge, engaged in an attempt to intercept William Nicolson, the Bishop of Carlisle, at his residence, Rose Castle. He also acted at times as a spy. At Preston in Lancashire, where on 13 November 1715 the Jacobites were defeated, Patten had his horse shot under him. He was there made prisoner, and carried under a close guard to London, where he turned king's evidence.

== Works ==
Patten wrote a history of rising with a Hanoverian perspective. It was published in two editions in 1717, the second being enlarged. It is entitled A History of the late Rebellion, with Original Papers and the Characters of the principal Noblemen and Gentlemen concerned in it; by the Rev. Mr. Robert Patten, formerly Chaplain to Mr. Forster. Two subsequent editions, the third and fourth, were published in 1745. In the book's preface Patten dated the origin of the rising from the 1710 trial of Henry Sacheverell and "the licentious Freedom of some in their publick Discourses, and others in their Addresses, to cry up the old Doctrine of Passive Obedience, and to give Hints and Arguments to prove Hereditary Right".

In 1718 Patten published a pamphlet The Rebel Convinc'd and Liberty Maintain'd, an apologia for his change of views.

Walter Scott drew upon his works for the historical background of his novel the Black Dwarf.

== In literature ==
Patten figures as "Creeping Bob" in Sir Walter Besant's Dorothy Forster, an historical novel of the Northumbrian share in the rising.

== Notes ==
Attribution

This article incorporates text from a publication now in the public domain: Lee, Sidney, ed. (1895). "Patten, Robert". Dictionary of National Biography. Vol. 44. London: Smith, Elder & Co.
