= The First World War (TV series) =

- Created by: Jonathan Lewis
- Directed by: Various
- Narrated by: Jonathan Lewis
- Opening theme: Cecil Coles
- Composer: Orlando Gough
- Country of origin: United Kingdom
- Original language: English
- No. of series: 1
- No. of episodes: 10

Production
- Producers: Wark Clements & Hamilton Films
- Running time: 8 hrs 23 min (Ten 50 min episodes)

Original release
- Network: Channel 4
- Release: 22 September – 22 November 2003

The First World War (2003) is a ten-part Channel 4 documentary television series surveying the history of World War I (1914-1918). It is based on the 2003 book of the same name by Oxford history professor Hew Strachan. (Additionally, a tie-in book of participant letters and diaries — A War in Words (2003) by Svetlana Palmer and Sarah Wallis — was published for the series.) The series was narrated and produced by Jonathan Lewis and was directed by Corina Sturmer, Marcus Kiggell, and Simon Rockell.

== Episodes ==
- To Arms 1914 The complex origins of the Great War, and how seemingly insignificant local tensions in the Balkans exploded into World War
- Under the Eagle 1914 – 1915 The German invasion of Belgium and France was brutal and fanned the flames of war
- Global War 1914 – 1916 The European Empires clashed all across the world, from the South Atlantic Seas to the plains of Africa
- Jihad 1914 – 1916 The Turkish Ottoman Empire proved a formidable foe, as Allies found to their cost at Gallipoli and in the Middle East
- Shackled to a Corpse 1914 – 1916 As the Germans and Austrians clashed with the Russians on the bitter Eastern Front, Italy became embroiled in a terrible slaughter, where people fought in the worst of terrains under harsh conditions
- Breaking the Deadlock 1915 – 1917 The Somme and Verdun saw carnage on an unprecedented scale, as armies fought to break the stalemate on the Western Front
- Blockade 1916 – 1917 The war at sea was every bit as bitter as the war on land. The battle at Jutland proved inconclusive, but the U-Boat menace threatened Britain as never before. Meanwhile, the United States entered the war.
- Revolution 1917 The effects of The Great War shattered nations, inspired mass mutinies by desperate troops, caused great upheaval on the home front and changed the world forever.
- Germany’s Last Gamble 1918 Over 1 million German troops were committed to Kaiserschlacht – the last great offensive of the war, while conflict still raged on many other fronts
- War Without End The dramatic Allied victory at Amiens led to victory in just 100 days and the signing of a bitterly resented peace, while other nations stumbled towards their own ceasefire agreements

== Reception ==
According to International Historic Films:

Universally acclaimed as one of the finest documentary series ever made about the Great War, Channel 4's The First World War is a powerful, original and truly comprehensive account of the conflict. It places the war in a truly global military context as never before, exploring many of the little-known campaigns, battles, and actions as well as the better-known conflict on the Western Front. The series combines previously unseen footage from newly accessible archives in Central and Eastern Europe with the exclusive film of many of the battlefields as they are today, studies of key participants and weaponry, and diary entries and letters home from soldiers, officers, and commanders.

ABC Australia comments that:

Television has tended to look at the First World War through a veil of tears, seeing only a tragic waste of life in the mud of Flanders. This definitive series strips away ninety years of myopia to get back to the reality of the war... This was a global conflict from the start, involving nations in every continent and people of all classes and races. Using fresh archive footage and specially shot material from authentic locations in 22 countries, the multi-layered series demolishes myths and answers key questions from the origins of the war to its bitter end.

A review by dOc DVD Review states:

This is a beautiful, comprehensive look at World War I. The events and people are relayed in great detail, though it isn't until the final ten minutes that the documentary takes on a life of its own. As the effects of the war are discussed, from the Treaty of Versailles to the death toll, the most disturbing thing is to see how much good came from this conflict. Democracy began to spread, militarism lessened, the League of Nations was created, oppressed people formed national identities, and foreign aggression was defeated. Yet this war could not resolve the violent underpinnings of human nature. Instead, it gave them new hope, for, as the narration points out, "Its terrible message was that war can effect change. That war can fulfill ambitions. That war can work."

== Media ==
=== Book ===
- Release date: 26 April 2005
- ISBN 978-0143035183

=== DVD ===
- DVD Release Date: 30 August 2005
- Studio: Image Entertainment
- Run Time: 523 minutes
- Number of discs: 4
- Aspect Ratio: 1.33:1
- Rated: NR (Not Rated)
- Extras: a 31-page guide to the documentary, containing an episode directory.

=== Soundtrack ===
The original music for the series was composed by Orlando Gough while the opening and closing title music was composed by Cecil Coles and arranged by Orlando Gough.
