= List of listed buildings in Peebles, Scottish Borders =

This is a list of listed buildings in the parish of Peebles in the Scottish Borders, Scotland.

== List ==
Name	Location	Date listed	Grid ref. (Note: Sometimes known as OSGB36, the grid reference (where provided) is based on the British national grid reference system used by the Ordnance Survey. • "Guide to National Grid". Ordnance Survey. • "Get-a-map". Ordnance Survey.)	Geo-coordinates	Notes	LB number (Note: Historic Environment Scotland assign a unique alphanumeric identifier to each designated site in Scotland, for listed buildings this always begins with "LB", for example "LB12345".)	Image
11And 15 Northgate				55°39′09″N 3°11′21″W	Category C(S)	39240	Upload Photo
Old Town, Remains Of St Andrews Church				55°39′10″N 3°11′57″W	Category B	39248	Upload Photo
Rosetta Road, Kingsland Primary School, With Janitor's House, Boundary Walls, Shelters, Gatepiers And Railings				55°39′26″N 3°11′51″W	Category B	39255	Upload Photo
Springhill Road, Barima With Boundary Walls				55°38′54″N 3°11′24″W	Category C(S)	39266	Upload Photo
4 Springhill Road, Falcony Cottage				55°38′56″N 3°11′28″W	Category C(S)	39269	Upload Photo
10 Springhill Road, Cruachan				55°38′56″N 3°11′27″W	Category C(S)	39272	Upload Photo
Springwood Road And Springwood Terrace, Springwood Lodge With Boundary Walls				55°38′47″N 3°11′24″W	Category B	39275	Upload Photo
Venlaw Road And Edinburgh Road, Holland And Sherry Warehouse And Offices With Boundary Walls				55°39′14″N 3°11′17″W	Category B	39285	Upload Photo
1 And 2 Venlaw Road				55°39′10″N 3°11′15″W	Category C(S)	39287	Upload Photo
West Port, The Bridge Inn (And Nanking Chinese Restaurant)				55°39′04″N 3°11′34″W	Category B	39288	Upload Photo
1 Bridgegate				55°39′08″N 3°11′21″W	Category C(S)	39152	Upload Photo
Caledonian Road, Bridgelands And Rowanbank With Boundary Wall And Gatepiers				55°38′56″N 3°11′44″W	Category C(S)	39153	Upload Photo
10 Crossland Crescent With Boundary Walls				55°39′10″N 3°11′40″W	Category B	39159	Upload Photo
Damdale, Footbridge				55°39′18″N 3°11′26″W	Category C(S)	39160	Upload Photo
36-40 (Even Nos) Dean Park, Edinburgh Road				55°39′18″N 3°11′21″W	Category C(S)	39163	Upload Photo
Edderston Road, Craigerne School With Coach House And Lodge				55°38′31″N 3°11′44″W	Category B	39168	Upload Photo
16 Elcho Street, Graham Cottage, With Front Wall, Railings And Gatepiers				55°39′11″N 3°11′31″W	Category C(S)	39174	Upload Photo
5-11 (Odd Nos) High Street (Incorporating The Keg Lounge Bar)				55°39′06″N 3°11′21″W	Category B	39190	Upload Photo
63-67 (Odd Nos) High Street				55°39′04″N 3°11′31″W	Category C(S)	39195	Upload Photo
18 And 20 High Street, The Medical Hall				55°39′07″N 3°11′23″W	Category B	39199	Upload Photo
Innerleithen Road, Peebles Hotel Hydro Lodge				55°39′05″N 3°10′31″W	Category B	39221	Upload Photo
Talisman Place, Kingsmeadows Road, 1-7 (Inclusive) Kingsmeadows Stables				55°38′47″N 3°10′45″W	Category C(S)	39229	Upload Photo
1-5 (Inclusive Nos) Biggiesknowe, And 1-6 (Inclusive Nos) Bridge House Terrace With Forestairs And Balcony				55°39′07″N 3°11′33″W	Category C(S)	39140	Upload Photo
14 Biggiesknowe				55°39′08″N 3°11′32″W	Category C(S)	39141	Upload Photo
Bonnington Road, Arnsheen, With Garage, Sundial, Gatepiers, Gates And Boundary Wall				55°38′26″N 3°11′21″W	Category B	39144	Upload Photo
Bonnington Road, Craigmount, With Gatepiers And Boundary Walls				55°38′27″N 3°11′25″W	Category C(S)	39145	Upload Photo
Edston Toll (Also Known As Lyne Toll)				55°38′53″N 3°15′17″W	Category C(S)	15208	Upload Photo
Neidpath Castle Including Courtyard Buildings, Gateway, Former Walled Garden And Boundary Wall				55°39′07″N 3°12′54″W	Category A	13857	Upload another image
Kingsmeadows Road, Kingsmeadows House Including Terrace, Wall, Gazebo, Gate, Gatepiers And Boundary Wall				55°38′50″N 3°10′40″W	Category B	47381	Upload Photo
Eshiels, Council Depot (Former Gasworks), Railway Buildings, Single Shed, Office Block, Gatepiers And Boundary Wall				55°38′47″N 3°09′31″W	Category B	48929	Upload Photo
Peebles, South Park Wood, Former Railway Tunnel				55°39′31″N 3°11′58″W	Category B	48931	Upload Photo
Northgate, Cross Keys Inn, 13 And 26 Northgate (The Couchee Righ)				55°39′10″N 3°11′19″W	Category B	39237	Upload Photo
5 And 7 Northgate				55°39′09″N 3°11′21″W	Category B	39238	Upload Photo
43, 45 And 47 Northgate				55°39′13″N 3°11′21″W	Category C(S)	39241	Upload Photo
Rosetta Road, St Joseph Rc Church And Presbytery, With Boundary Walls, Gate And Gatepiers (Presbytery Is 17 Rosetta Road)				55°39′15″N 3°11′48″W	Category B	39257	Upload Photo
Rosetta Road, St Joseph's Rc Church Hall And 19 And 21 Rosetta Road, With Boundary Walls				55°39′16″N 3°11′48″W	Category C(S)	39258	Upload Photo
Springhill Road, Victoria Park Gates And Railings				55°38′54″N 3°11′25″W	Category C(S)	39268	Upload Photo
Talisman Place, White Cottage				55°38′45″N 3°10′47″W	Category C(S)	39276	Upload Photo
Bonnington Road, Reiverslaw With Lodge, Gatepiers, Gates, Garage, Greenhouse And Boundary Walls				55°38′25″N 3°11′23″W	Category B	39149	Upload Photo
2 Bonnington Road, Kingsville				55°38′40″N 3°11′23″W	Category C(S)	39150	Upload Photo
7 Crossland Crescent, Edrom Villa, With Boundary Walls				55°39′09″N 3°11′39″W	Category C(S)	39157	Upload Photo
3 Damdale With Boundary Wall And Gate				55°39′14″N 3°11′30″W	Category B	39161	Upload Photo
3-9 (Odd Nos) Eastgate				55°39′08″N 3°11′19″W	Category C(S)	39167	Upload Photo
Edinburgh Road, North Lodge, (Venlaw Castle Hotel) With Gatepiers And Boundary Walls				55°39′45″N 3°11′34″W	Category C(S)	39172	Upload Photo
Edinburgh Road, Venlaw South Lodge With Boundary Walls And Gatepiers				55°39′23″N 3°11′22″W	Category C(S)	39173	Upload Photo
High Street, Veitch Memorial				55°39′05″N 3°11′27″W	Category C(S)	39189	Upload Photo
27, 27A And 29 High Street				55°39′06″N 3°11′24″W	Category B	39191	Upload Photo
56 And 58 High Street				55°39′06″N 3°11′28″W	Category C(S)	39205	Upload Photo
Innerleithen Road, Kerfield, With Bridge				55°38′58″N 3°10′34″W	Category B	39213	Upload Photo
Innerleithen Road, Kerfield Cottage, Stable, Coach House, Barns And Associated Buildings, With Boundary Walls And Gatepiers				55°39′00″N 3°10′32″W	Category B	39216	Upload Photo
Kingsmeadows Road, Woodbine Cottage				55°38′57″N 3°11′22″W	Category C(S)	39228	Upload Photo
49 March Street, Sunbury Villa With Front Walls And Railings				55°39′16″N 3°11′45″W	Category C(S)	39234	Upload Photo
Bonnington Road, Kingsmuir Hall, Middle House, And Cottage				55°38′44″N 3°11′19″W	Category C(S)	39146	Upload Photo
Winkston Farm House				55°40′30″N 3°12′08″W	Category B	15213	Upload Photo
Redscarhead, George Meikle Kemp Memorial (At Moy Hall)				55°41′02″N 3°12′38″W	Category B	15215	Upload Photo
85 Northgate				55°39′17″N 3°11′23″W	Category B	39242	Upload Photo
Old Town, Hay Lodge Park Gatepiers, Gates, Boundary Walls And Ice House				55°39′08″N 3°11′57″W	Category C(S)	39247	Upload Photo
84 Old Town				55°39′08″N 3°11′48″W	Category C(S)	39253	Upload Photo
1 St Andrews Place				55°39′12″N 3°11′53″W	Category C(S)	39261	Upload Photo
St Andrews Road, Cemetery Lodge With Boundary Wall And Gates				55°39′11″N 3°11′55″W	Category C(S)	39264	Upload Photo
Tweed Green And School Brae, Former English School With Gate And Boundary Wall				55°39′03″N 3°11′23″W	Category C(S)	39280	Upload Photo
Venlaw High Road, Hyndlea And Rathacraig, With Boundary Walls And Railings				55°39′14″N 3°10′56″W	Category B	39283	Upload Photo
4, 4A And 6 Bonnington Road With Boundary Wall				55°38′38″N 3°11′24″W	Category C(S)	39151	Upload Photo
Edderston Road, Greybield				55°38′43″N 3°11′53″W	Category B	39169	Upload Photo
Frankscroft, Ravenscraig				55°38′55″N 3°11′45″W	Category C(S)	39178	Upload Photo
37 High Street				55°39′05″N 3°11′26″W	Category B	39192	Upload Photo
2-6 (Even Nos) High Street And 1 And 3 Northgate				55°39′07″N 3°11′21″W	Category B	39198	Upload Photo
50 And 52 High Street				55°39′06″N 3°11′27″W	Category B	39203	Upload Photo
54 High Street, Crown Hotel				55°39′07″N 3°11′28″W	Category C(S)	39204	Upload Photo
70, 72 And 74 High Street				55°39′06″N 3°11′30″W	Category C(S)	39208	Upload Photo
80 And 82 High Street				55°39′06″N 3°11′31″W	Category C(S)	39209	Upload Photo
Innerleithen Road, Kerfield Kitchen Garden Walls				55°38′59″N 3°10′27″W	Category C(S)	39217	Upload Photo
8, 8A And 9 Kingsmeadows Road, St Margaret's And Fernside, With Boundary Walls And Railings				55°38′57″N 3°11′24″W	Category C(S)	39226	Upload Photo
19 And 21 March Street, Marion Cottage And Alexander Cottage				55°39′17″N 3°11′36″W	Category C(S)	39232	Upload Photo
11 Murray Place, Fairholm, With Boundary Walls				55°39′18″N 3°11′32″W	Category C(S)	39235	Upload Photo
Neidpath Railway Viaduct (Near Neidpath Castle)				55°38′57″N 3°13′14″W	Category A	15206	Upload another image See more images
Winkston Tower House				55°40′31″N 3°12′08″W	Category B	15214	Upload Photo
32 And 34 Northgate With Boundary Walls And Gatepiers				55°39′11″N 3°11′19″W	Category B	39243	Upload Photo
40 Rosetta Road, Ratho Cottage, With Boundary Wall				55°39′18″N 3°11′47″W	Category C(S)	39260	Upload Photo
Tweed Bridge				55°39′02″N 3°11′34″W	Category A	39278	Upload another image See more images
Tweed Green, Cabbage Hall, With Boundary Wall				55°39′04″N 3°11′20″W	Category C(S)	39279	Upload Photo
Tweedgreen, Old Rectory And Tweedbrae, East Rectory				55°39′05″N 3°11′16″W	Category C(S)	39282	Upload Photo
Venlaw High Road, Redbraes With Gatepiers And Boundary Wall				55°39′16″N 3°11′07″W	Category B	39284	Upload Photo
Chambers Terrace, Dalhousia				55°38′54″N 3°11′34″W	Category B	39154	Upload Photo
Edderston Road, Tantah Lodge And Boundary Wall				55°38′30″N 3°11′54″W	Category C(S)	39171	Upload Photo
High Street, Mercat Cross				55°39′07″N 3°11′19″W	Category B	39183	Upload Photo
26 And 28 High Street				55°39′07″N 3°11′24″W	Category B	39201	Upload Photo
88 And 90 High Street				55°39′05″N 3°11′32″W	Category B	39211	Upload Photo
Innerleithen Road, Whiteknowe With Boundary Walls, Gatepiers And Gates				55°39′04″N 3°10′59″W	Category C(S)	39224	Upload Photo
Kingsmuir Drive, Kingswood With Greenhouse, Boundary Walls And Gatepiers				55°38′41″N 3°11′19″W	Category B	39230	Upload Photo
18 Biggiesknowe With Boundary Wall And Railings				55°39′08″N 3°11′31″W	Category C(S)	39142	Upload Photo
Castle Venlaw Hotel And Terrace				55°39′32″N 3°11′21″W	Category B	19729	Upload Photo
Chapelhill Farmhouse And Courtyard Farm Buildings				55°40′02″N 3°12′05″W	Category B	15211	Upload Photo
Chapel Hill Bridge				55°40′02″N 3°11′58″W	Category B	15212	Upload Photo
Tweed Green, Leckie Memorial Church (Formerly The East U.P. Church) Including Hall, Boundary Walls, Railings, Gatepiers And Gates				55°39′06″N 3°11′18″W	Category B	48644	Upload Photo
East Station Car Park, Former Goods Office				55°39′12″N 3°11′15″W	Category C(S)	44612	Upload Photo
4 Murray Place, Allanbank Villa, With Boundary Walls And Railings				55°39′17″N 3°11′30″W	Category C(S)	39236	Upload Photo
9 Northgate, Masonic Lodge				55°39′09″N 3°11′21″W	Category C(S)	39239	Upload Photo
Old Town, Bridge House, At Cuddy Bridge				55°39′07″N 3°11′33″W	Category B	39244	Upload Photo
1 And 3 Old Town				55°39′07″N 3°11′36″W	Category B	39250	Upload Photo
51 Old Town				55°39′07″N 3°11′46″W	Category C(S)	39251	Upload Photo
Priorsford Bridge, Over River Tweed				55°38′58″N 3°11′15″W	Category B	39254	Upload Photo
6 Springhill Road, Willowbank				55°38′56″N 3°11′28″W	Category C(S)	39270	Upload Photo
Venlaw Road, Part Of Old Burgh Wall And Bastion				55°39′12″N 3°11′15″W	Category B	39286	Upload Photo
West Port, Police Station				55°39′04″N 3°11′32″W	Category B	39289	Upload Photo
41 And 43 High Street				55°39′05″N 3°11′28″W	Category C(S)	39193	Upload Photo
63-73 (Odd Nos) High Street				55°39′04″N 3°11′31″W	Category B	39196	Upload Photo
64 High Street				55°39′06″N 3°11′28″W	Category C(S)	39207	Upload Photo
Innerleithen Road, Kerfield West Lodge				55°39′01″N 3°10′36″W	Category B	39215	Upload Photo
Innerleithen Road, Manse With Boundary Walls And Gatepiers				55°39′06″N 3°10′56″W	Category B	39218	Upload Photo
Innerleithen Road, Park Hotel				55°39′06″N 3°11′11″W	Category C(S)	39219	Upload Photo
17 March Street, Rosebery Cottage, With Front Wall				55°39′17″N 3°11′35″W	Category B	39231	Upload Photo
Neidpath Cottage				55°39′00″N 3°13′20″W	Category C(S)	15207	Upload Photo
Rosetta House				55°39′37″N 3°12′12″W	Category B	15209	Upload Photo
Haystoun, Including Courtyard Range And Walled Garden				55°37′58″N 3°10′40″W	Category B	15217	Upload Photo
Old Town, Former Hay Lodge Stables, With Boundary Wall				55°39′09″N 3°11′55″W	Category C(S)	39246	Upload Photo
Rosetta Road, Tweeddale District Council Offices, With Gatepiers, Boundary Walls And Lamp Standards				55°39′26″N 3°11′48″W	Category B	39256	Upload another image
3 St Andrews Place				55°39′12″N 3°11′53″W	Category C(S)	39262	Upload Photo
2 St Andrews Road, Glenharvey Cottage, With Boundary Wall				55°39′11″N 3°11′49″W	Category C(S)	39265	Upload Photo
12 Springhill Road, Haystoun Cottage				55°38′55″N 3°11′26″W	Category C(S)	39273	Upload Photo
13 Crossland Crescent, Craiglee, With Boundary Walls				55°39′10″N 3°11′42″W	Category C(S)	39158	Upload Photo
Eastgate, St Peter's Episcopal Church				55°39′07″N 3°11′18″W	Category B	39164	Upload Photo
Firknowe				55°39′13″N 3°12′07″W	Category C(S)	39175	Upload Photo
High Street, Chambers Institution, War Memorial				55°39′06″N 3°11′21″W	Category B	39181	Upload Photo
High Street, Old Parish Church				55°39′05″N 3°11′36″W	Category B	39184	Upload another image
High Street, Sheriff Court House, Former County Hall				55°39′05″N 3°11′33″W	Category B	39185	Upload Photo
46 And 48 High Street				55°39′07″N 3°11′27″W	Category C(S)	39202	Upload Photo
Innerleithen Road, Glentrees, With Boundary Walls				55°39′04″N 3°10′46″W	Category B	39212	Upload Photo
Innerleithen Road, Peebles Hotel Hydro, With Terracing				55°39′09″N 3°10′38″W	Category B	39220	Upload Photo
Innerleithen Road, The White Stone And Wall				55°39′04″N 3°10′55″W	Category B	39223	Upload Photo
45 And 47 March Street, Gregory Place, With Boundary Walls				55°39′16″N 3°11′44″W	Category C(S)	39233	Upload Photo
Rosetta, Walled Garden And Garden Building				55°39′35″N 3°12′13″W	Category C(S)	15210	Upload Photo
Standalane Cottage				55°39′44″N 3°12′09″W	Category C(S)	48932	Upload Photo
Old Town, Hay Lodge, With Boundary Walls				55°39′05″N 3°11′52″W	Category B	39245	Upload Photo
1 Rosetta Road, Viewfield, With Boundary Walls				55°39′12″N 3°11′47″W	Category C(S)	39259	Upload Photo
8 Springhill Road, Rydale				55°38′56″N 3°11′27″W	Category C(S)	39271	Upload Photo
Springwood Drive, Springwood House				55°38′49″N 3°11′29″W	Category C(S)	39274	Upload Photo
Tweed Green And School Brae, Grammar School With Gate				55°39′03″N 3°11′21″W	Category B	39281	Upload Photo
8 Cross Road With Boundary Walls, Gatepiers And Gates				55°39′14″N 3°11′33″W	Category C(S)	39156	Upload Photo
Eastgate And Venlaw Road, Green Tree Inn				55°39′08″N 3°11′14″W	Category C(S)	39166	Upload Photo
Edderston Road, Tantah				55°38′24″N 3°11′54″W	Category B	39170	Upload Photo
Frankscroft, Borrowlea				55°38′53″N 3°11′46″W	Category C(S)	39176	Upload Photo
Frankscroft, Maryfield				55°38′51″N 3°11′45″W	Category C(S)	39177	Upload Photo
High Street, Chambers Institution				55°39′06″N 3°11′21″W	Category A	39180	Upload another image
High Street, Telephone Kiosk Outside County Hotel				55°39′06″N 3°11′25″W	Category B	39186	Upload Photo
High Street, Tontine Hotel				55°39′04″N 3°11′26″W	Category B	39187	Upload Photo
High Street, Town House				55°39′05″N 3°11′23″W	Category A	39188	Upload another image
49 High Street				55°39′05″N 3°11′28″W	Category C(S)	39194	Upload Photo
75 And 77 High Street				55°39′04″N 3°11′32″W	Category B	39197	Upload Photo
60 High Street				55°39′06″N 3°11′28″W	Category C(S)	39206	Upload Photo
Innerleithen Road, Venbrae And Ravensmeade, With Boundary Walls				55°39′04″N 3°10′50″W	Category C(S)	39222	Upload Photo
Kingsmeadows Road, St. Peter's Old Rectory With Boundary Walls And Gatepiers				55°38′56″N 3°11′19″W	Category B	39227	Upload Photo
36 Biggiesknowe, Red Lion House, With Boundary Wall				55°39′10″N 3°11′28″W	Category B	39143	Upload Photo
Bonnington Road, Kingsmuir Lodge With Quadrant Walls				55°38′42″N 3°11′22″W	Category C(S)	39147	Upload Photo
Old Town, St Andrew's Cemetery With Boundary Wall, Gatepiers, Gates And Railings				55°39′12″N 3°12′00″W	Category C(S)	39249	Upload Photo
53 Old Town				55°39′07″N 3°11′46″W	Category C(S)	39252	Upload Photo
5 St Andrews Place				55°39′13″N 3°11′53″W	Category C(S)	39263	Upload Photo
Springhill Road, Elderscroft With Boundary Walls, Gatepiers, Gates And Railings				55°38′51″N 3°11′22″W	Category C(S)	39267	Upload Photo
Tweed Avenue, Priorsford House And Lodge With Boundary Walls And Gatepiers				55°39′00″N 3°11′13″W	Category C(S)	39277	Upload Photo
Cross Road, Remains Of The Cross Kirk With Boundary Walls				55°39′15″N 3°11′33″W	Category A	39155	Upload another image
5 Damdale With Front Wall And Gate				55°39′15″N 3°11′29″W	Category C(S)	39162	Upload Photo
Eastgate, Eastgate Theatre And Arts Centre, Former Free Church				55°39′09″N 3°11′15″W	Category B	39165	Upload Photo
High Street, County Hotel				55°39′05″N 3°11′25″W	Category B	39182	Upload another image See more images
22 And 24 High Street				55°39′07″N 3°11′24″W	Category C(S)	39200	Upload Photo
84 And 86 High Street				55°39′06″N 3°11′31″W	Category C(S)	39210	Upload Photo
Innerleithen Road, Kerfield East Lodge				55°38′59″N 3°10′23″W	Category C(S)	39214	Upload Photo
Innerleithen Road, Whitestone House With Boundary Walls				55°39′04″N 3°10′58″W	Category C(S)	39225	Upload Photo
Bonnington Road, Kingswood Lodge With Boundary Walls				55°38′42″N 3°11′21″W	Category C(S)	39148	Upload Photo
Rosetta Stables				55°39′38″N 3°12′14″W	Category B	19728	Upload Photo
Whitehaugh Farm				55°38′23″N 3°10′18″W	Category B	15216	Upload Photo
Rosetta, Lodge And Gatepiers				55°39′32″N 3°11′57″W	Category C(S)	48930	Upload Photo

== Key ==
The scheme for classifying buildings in Scotland is:

- Category A: "buildings of national or international importance, either architectural or historic; or fine, little-altered examples of some particular period, style or building type."
- Category B: "buildings of regional or more than local importance; or major examples of some particular period, style or building type, which may have been altered."
- Category C: "buildings of local importance; lesser examples of any period, style, or building type, as originally constructed or moderately altered; and simple traditional buildings which group well with other listed buildings."

In March 2016 there were 47,288 listed buildings in Scotland. Of these, 8% were Category A, and 50% were Category B, with the remaining 42% being Category C.
