= Lord Lieutenant of Tweeddale =

Ceremonial officer in Tweeddale, Scotland

This is a list of people who have served as Lord Lieutenant of Tweeddale. The office replaced the Lord Lieutenant of Peeblesshire in 1975.

- Scott had been Lord Lieutenant of Peeblesshire
- 1975–1980; Sir Robert Scott
- 1980–1994; Lieutenant Colonel Aidan Sprot
- 1994–2014; Captain Sir David Younger
- 2014–2024; Sir Hew Strachan
- 2024–present; Catherine Maxwell Stuart, 21st Lady of Traquair
