= Aidan Sprot =

Decorated British Army officer (1939–1962)

- Born: 17 January 1919; Lilliesleaf
- Died: 28 January 2021 (aged 102); Crookston by Peebles
- Military career
- Allegiance: United Kingdom
- Branch: British Army
- Service years: 1939–1962
- Rank: Lieutenant Colonel
- Unit: Royal Scots Greys
- Commands: Royal Scots Greys
- Conflicts: Second Battle of El Alamein, Operation Avalanche, Operation Overlord
- Awards: Military Cross; Legion of Honour
- Other work: Lord Lieutenant of Tweeddale

Lieutenant Colonel Aidan Mark Sprot MC (19 January 1919 – 28 January 2021) was a British Army officer, who won an immediate Military Cross and later served as the Lord Lieutenant of Tweeddale.

== Early life ==
Sprot was born on 19 January 1919 and was the son of Mark and Meliora Sprot (a daughter of Sir John Hay, 9th Baronet and Anne Milliken-Napier, daughter of Sir Robert Milliken-Napier, 9th Baronet). His sister Celia became Viscountess Whitelaw.

He was educated at Stowe School, Sprot was forbidden from following his father into the army, and initially worked as a banker in the City of London.

== Military career ==
On the outbreak of World War II, Sprot joined his father's old regiment, the Royal Scots Greys and was commissioned in 1941.

Serving in Palestine on internal security duties, Sprot then moved with his regiment to the Western Desert, where he took part in the Second Battle of El Alamein. In September 1943, he served during Operation Avalanche, the landings at Salerno.

In June 1944, the Royal Scots Greys were assigned to the Normandy landings, during which Sprot commanded the reconnaissance troop. He later saw action in the Falaise Pocket, where, on 1 September 1944, he performed the actions that resulted in him being awarded the Military Cross. After driving a Stuart tank over two stone bridges which were being prepared for demolition, at a third bridge, made of wood, Sprot was held up by enemy guns. After these were knocked out, a Scissors bridge was installed, which did not cover the full span. Sprot drove his tank, under heavy sniper fire, across the bridge, paving the way for half of the squadron to follow before the bridge became unusable, allowing for the village of Long to be captured.

After World War II, Sprot remained with Royal Scots Greys in Germany until 1952, before later also serving in Libya, Egypt and Jordan. He became the commander of the regiment from 1959 until his retirement from the army in 1962.

== Post military career ==
At the request of his uncle, Sir Duncan Hay, 10th Baronet of Smithfield and Haystoun, Sprot moved to the Riddell estate near Peebles, which he subsequently inherited. Sprot was a member of the Queen's Bodyguard for Scotland and served for 14 years as the Lord Lieutenant of Tweeddale. He was also active with the British Red Cross and Scout Association. Sprot was awarded the French Légion d'honneur in 2015.

== Family ==
Sprot never married.
