= Kilbucho =

Village in Scotland

Coordinates: 55.6018°N 3.4458°W

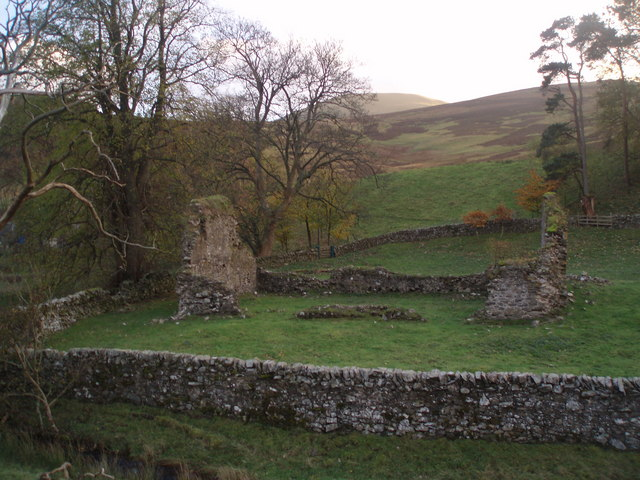
Ruins of the Church of Kilbucho

Kilbucho (Scottish Gaelic: Cille Bheagha) is a small settlement in the parish of Broughton, Glenholm and Kilbucho in the Scottish Borders area of Scotland in Peeblesshire and near Biggar and Broughton.

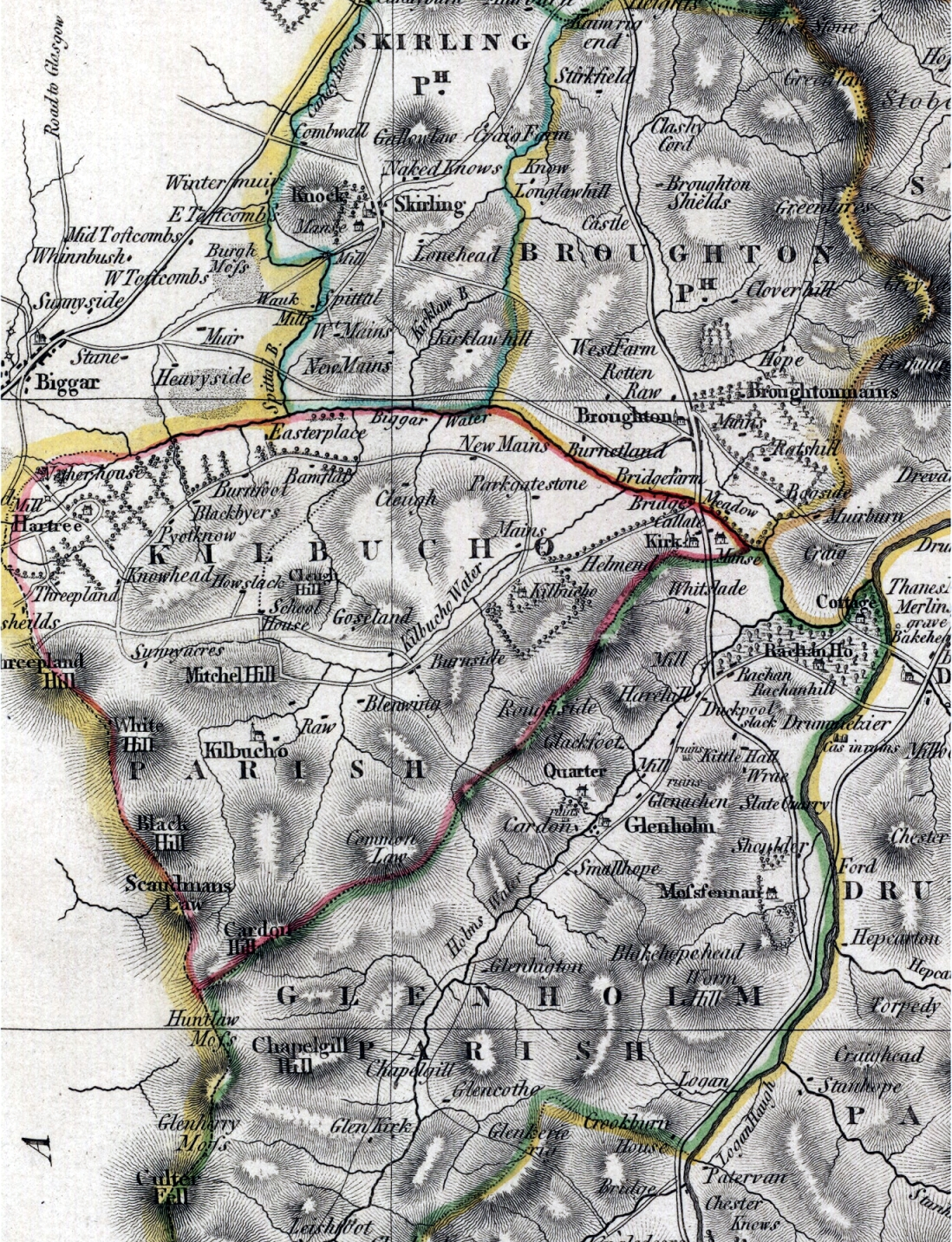
Kilbucho (1821) The parish was united with Broughton and Glenholm from 1794

The name derives from the church which was dedicated to St Bega an Irish abbess. Several monasteries were dedicated to St Bega, many in Cumbria including St Bees but also in Scotland at Kilbagie in Clackmannanshire and Kilbegie in Argyllshire. Near the church is St Bees well

The former parish of Kilbucho, now united in Broughton, Glenholm and Kilbucho, has an area of 6,710 acres. It forms a valley between Cardon Hill on the south and Hartree Hills on the north, however the land is mainly level with a very slight inclination towards Biggar Water. Kilbucho is "fenced" in by hills on three sides, including some of the highest in southern Scotland east of Galloway. Coulter Fell is near here.

The manors of Kilbucho and Thriepland are mentioned in writs of 13th century.

The area is strongly connected with John Buchan, the author of The Thirty Nine Steps and former governor general of Canada. It is thought that the inspiration for his 1927 novel Witch Wood comes from this particular area.

== Kilbucho Manse ==
The former manse (later converted to a farmhouse) dates from 1751, and has a rectangular form laid out on an east-west axes. It lies 50m SE of the ruined church. The interior incorporates a stone lintel from the 17th century, likely brought from the earlier manse.

== White Hill ==
West of Kilbucho stands White Hill (399m OD) where stands an important Ancient Monument: an Iron Age palisaded enclosure approximately 150 x 100m with an intact inner circle and substantially intact outer circle and with further concentric defences a further 50m beyond.

== See also ==
- List of places in the Scottish Borders
- List of places in Scotland
