= Manor Water =

River in Scotland

Coordinates: 55°38′N 3°14′W

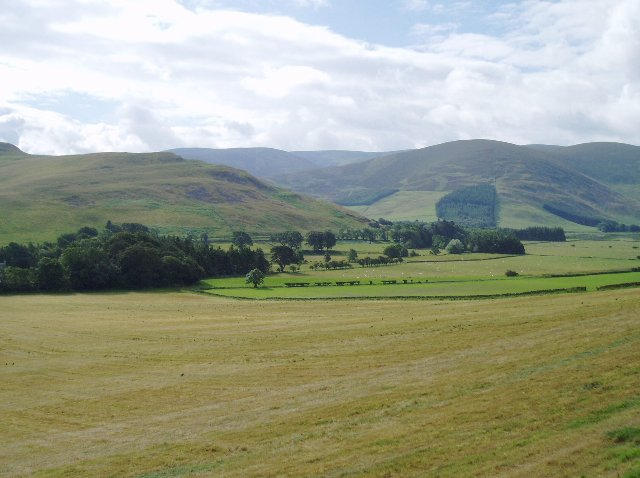
Farmland in the valley of the Manor Water

Manor Water is a river in the parish of Manor, Peeblesshire in the Scottish Borders. It rises in the Ettrick Forest and flows down through the Maynor valley, passing the various farms and hamlets of Maynor as well as Kirkton Manynor, where the Maynor kirk and village hall are flowing into the River Tweed one mile south of Peebles at Olde Maynor Brig, which is closed to traffic for the foreseeable future.

== See also ==
- List of places in the Scottish Borders
- List of places in Scotland
- List of rivers of Scotland
