= Black Dwarf (personage) =

Scottish dwarf (1740–1811)

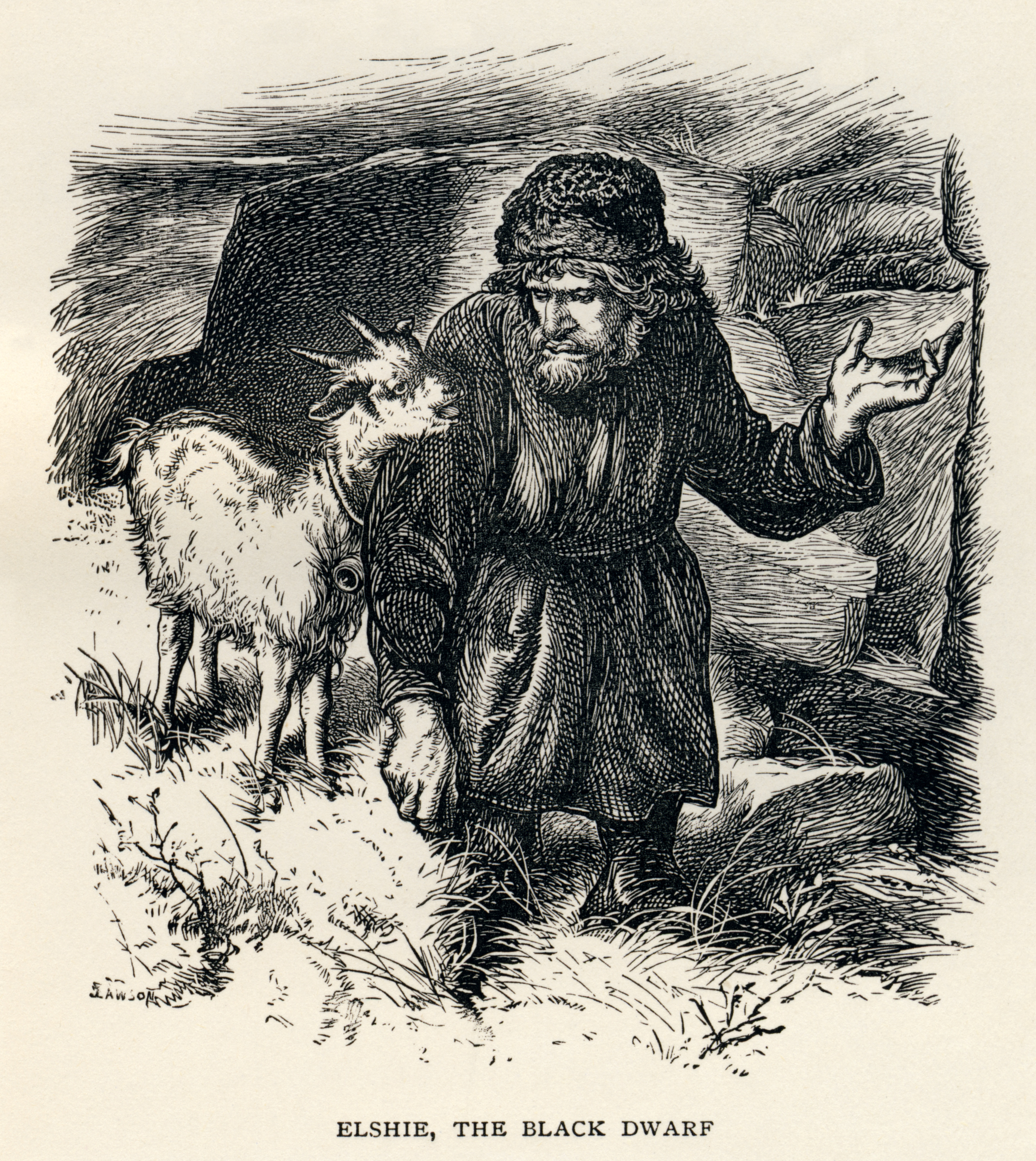
Engraving of the character in Scott's novel

David Ritchie (1740–1811), also known as David of Manor Water, Bow'd Davie, Crooked David, and most notably the Black Dwarf, was a dwarf, the son of a quarryman at the slate quarries of Stobo, Scotland. He was the inspiration for Sir Walter Scott's novel, The Black Dwarf. Scott visited him in 1797.

He was apprenticed as a brushmaker in Edinburgh, but was disliked because of his appearance.

In 1762, he moved to a cottage in the grounds of Woodhouse Farm near Peebles, built by Sir James Naesmyth of Posso. He eventually settled in a stone cottage on the banks of Manor Water near the town of Peebles, Scotland. The door of the cottage was about 3 feet and 6 inches high, and the ceiling was just high enough for him to stand inside. The superstitious locals feared he could cast the evil eye on them, blamed him for any problems with their livestock, and generally avoided him.

He never wore shoes, which would not fit on his misshapen feet. Instead, he wrapped his legs and feet in cloth. He walked with the help of a staff considerably taller than himself.

Sources described him as being irritable and having a shrill, dissonant laugh, but he is also described as an intellectual who enjoyed reading Milton's Paradise Lost and ballads by William Shenstone.

He died in his cottage in 1811 and was buried in the parish churchyard at Kirkton Manor slightly south-west of Peebles.

A statue by Robert Forrest of Leith was erected nearby at Hallyards House.
