= Peeblesshire =

- Historic county
- Peeblesshire shown within Scotland
- Interactive map of Peeblesshire
- Country: Scotland
- County town: Peebles

Area
  - Total: 548 sq mi (1,419 km^{2})
- Ranked 16th of 34
- Chapman code: PEE

Peeblesshire (Scottish Gaelic: Siorrachd nam Pùballan), alternately the County of Peebles, Shire of Peebles or Tweeddale, is a historic county of Scotland. Its county town is Peebles, and it borders Midlothian (historic) to the north, Selkirkshire to the east, Dumfriesshire to the south, and Lanarkshire to the west.

== History ==
The origins of Peeblesshire are obscure, but it became a shire sometime around the twelfth century, covering part of the historic district or province of Tweeddale. The southern part of Tweeddale became the sheriffdom of Selkirkshire, also known as Ettrick Forest, whilst the northern part of Tweeddale was initially divided into two sheriffdoms, based at Peebles and Traquair, before those two were united as the single shire of Peebles, or Peeblesshire, around 1304. From then on the shires gradually became the more important areas for administration; the old provinces were not abolished as such, but their importance diminished.

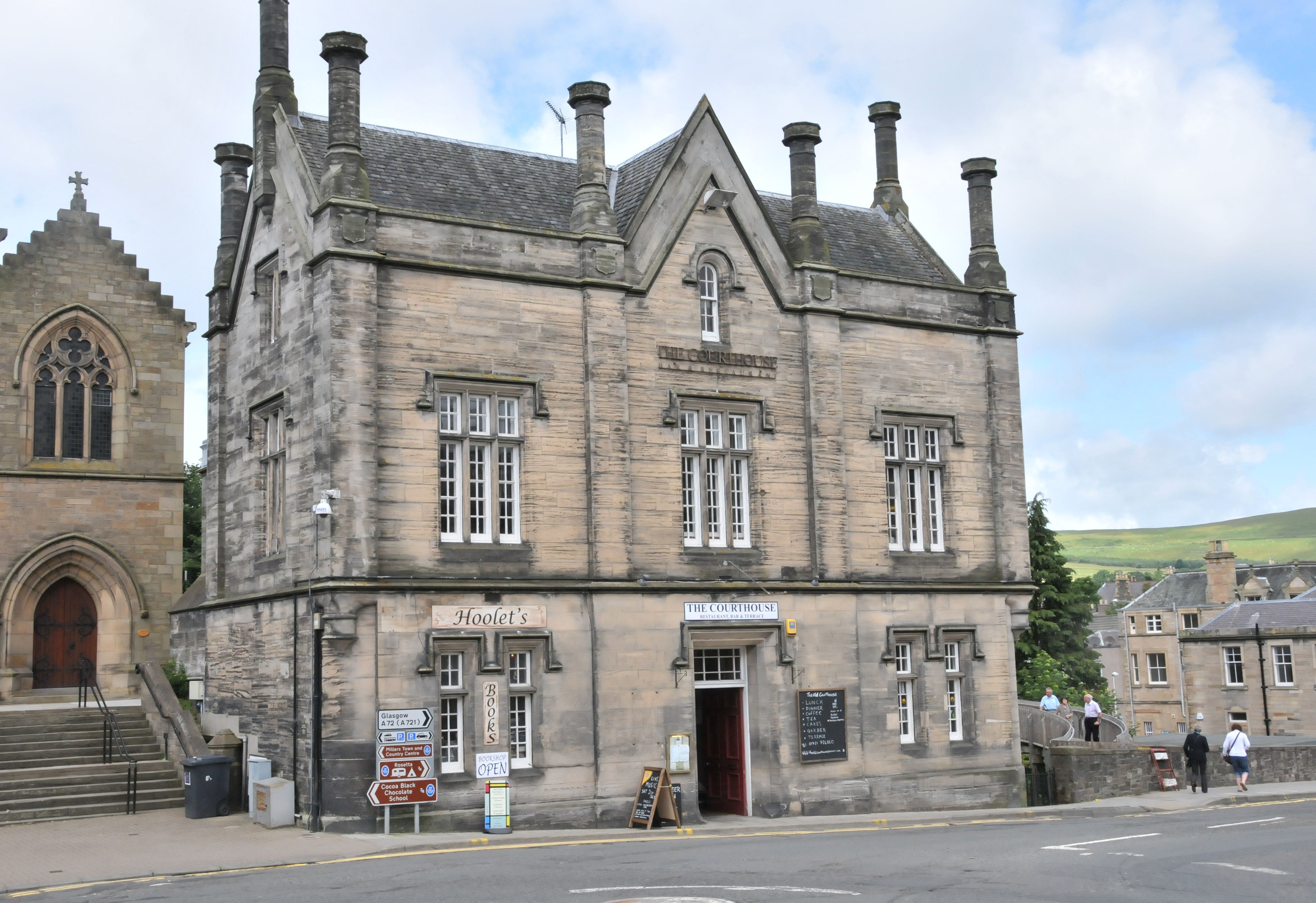
Former County Hall and courthouse, High Street, Peebles

Peeblesshire County Council was created in 1890 under the Local Government (Scotland) Act 1889, which established elected county councils across Scotland. The council held its first meeting on 22 May 1890 at the courthouse on High Street in Peebles, also known as County Hall, which had been built in 1844–1848 as a sheriff court and meeting place for the Commissioners of Supply, the main administrative body for the county prior to the creation of the county council.

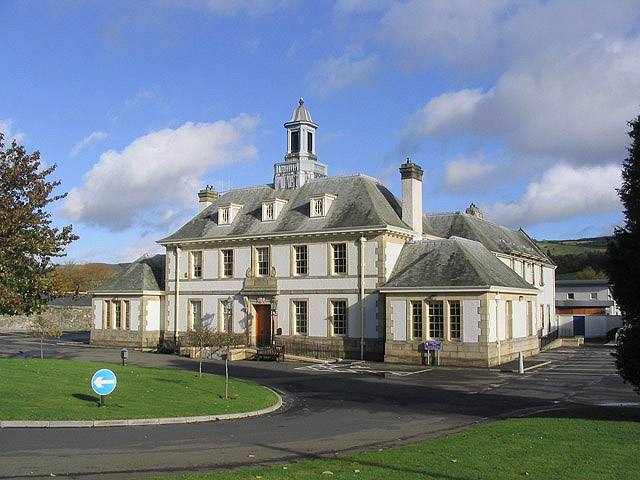
County Buildings, Rosetta Road, Peebles: Headquarters of Peeblesshire County Council after 1935

The county council continued to be based at the courthouse until 1935 when it moved to County Buildings on Rosetta Road in Peebles.

Peeblesshire County Council was abolished in 1975 under the Local Government (Scotland) Act 1973, which reorganised local government in Scotland into upper-tier regions and lower-tier districts. Peeblesshire became part of the Borders region and Tweeddale district, the latter having the same boundaries as the pre-1975 county of Peeblesshire. The last lord-lieutenant for the county of Peeblesshire became the first Lord Lieutenant of Tweeddale.

The Borders region and its four districts, including Tweeddale, were abolished in 1996, merging to form the present Scottish Borders council area. The area of the pre-1996 Tweeddale district (and therefore the same area as pre-1975 Peeblesshire) continues to be used as a lieutenancy area under the name of Tweeddale.

== Coat of arms ==
The coat of arms of the county, which was matriculated by the Lord Lyon in 1931, ia as follows: Quarterly, 1st sable five fraises (strawberry leaves) argent; 2nd azure, a horse's head couped argent; 3rd vert, a fleece or; 4th or, fretty gules, on a chief embattled of the last, two thunderbolts of the first. The arms are supported by two salmon proper, and the crest is a Border cavalryman. The motto is ONWARD TWEEDDALE. The first quarter is the arms of Fraser of Oliver Castle, a prominent local laird; the second, that of Horsburgh, another prominent local laird; the third, a reference to the area's wool industry; and the fourth, that of M. G. (later Sir Michael) Thorburn of Glenormiston, who was sheriff of Peebles at the time of the arms' matriculation.

== Geography ==
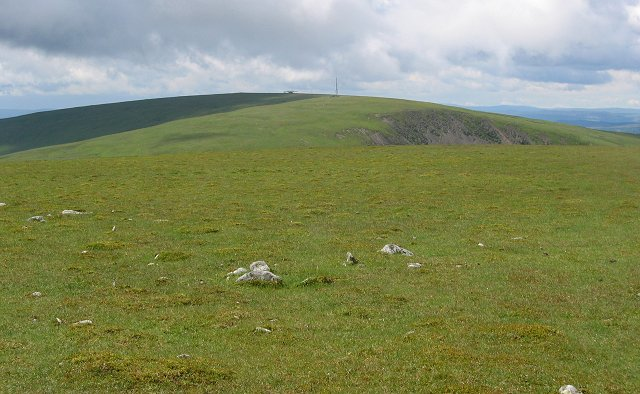
Broad Law, highest point of Peeblesshire, seen from Cramalt Craig

The county is landlocked and forms part of the Southern Uplands geographic region of Scotland. There are few settlements and the county consists mostly of low hill country, including parts of the Pentland Hills and Moorfoot Hills, with the highest point being Broad Law at 840 m (2,760 ft). The river Tweed is the chief river, flowing in a crescent shape through the county. Bodies of water in Peeblesshire include the Baddinsgill Reservoir, West Water Reservoir and Portmore Loch in the north and the Megget Reservoir, Talla Reservoir and Fruid Reservoir in the south.

== Transport ==
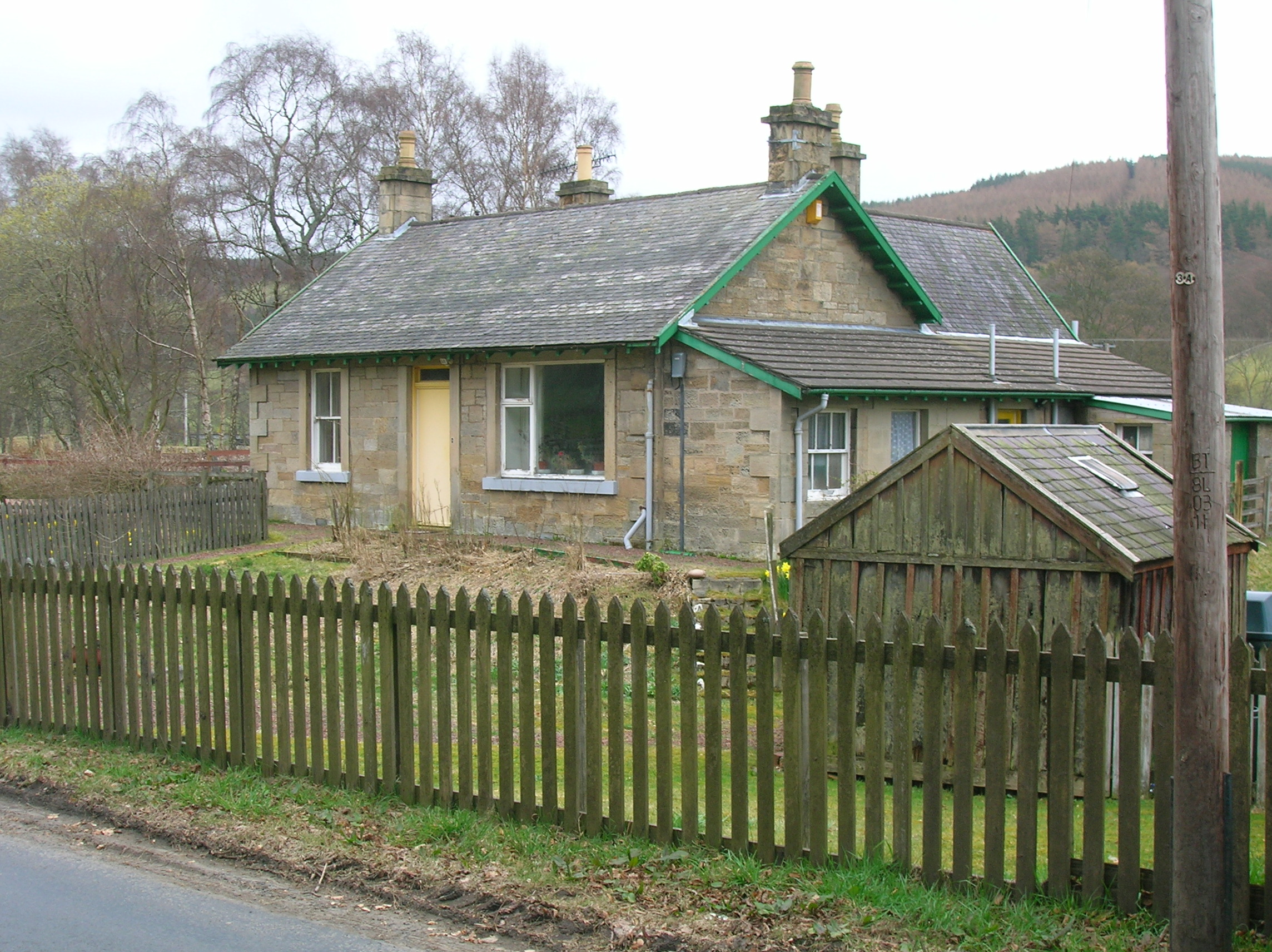
A disused railway station at Stobo

The county was formerly served by the Peebles Railway and the Symington, Biggar and Broughton Railway, however these lines closed in the 1950s-60s and there are now no active railways in the county.

== Settlements ==
- Blyth Bridge
- Broughton
- Cardrona
- Carlops
- Drumelzier
- Eddleston
- Innerleithen
- Kilbucho
- Kingledoors
- Kirkbryde
- Lyne
- Mossfennan
- Peebles
- Polmood
- Romannobridge
- Skirling
- Stanhope
- Traquair
- Tweedsmuir
- Walkerburn
- West Linton

== Civil parishes ==
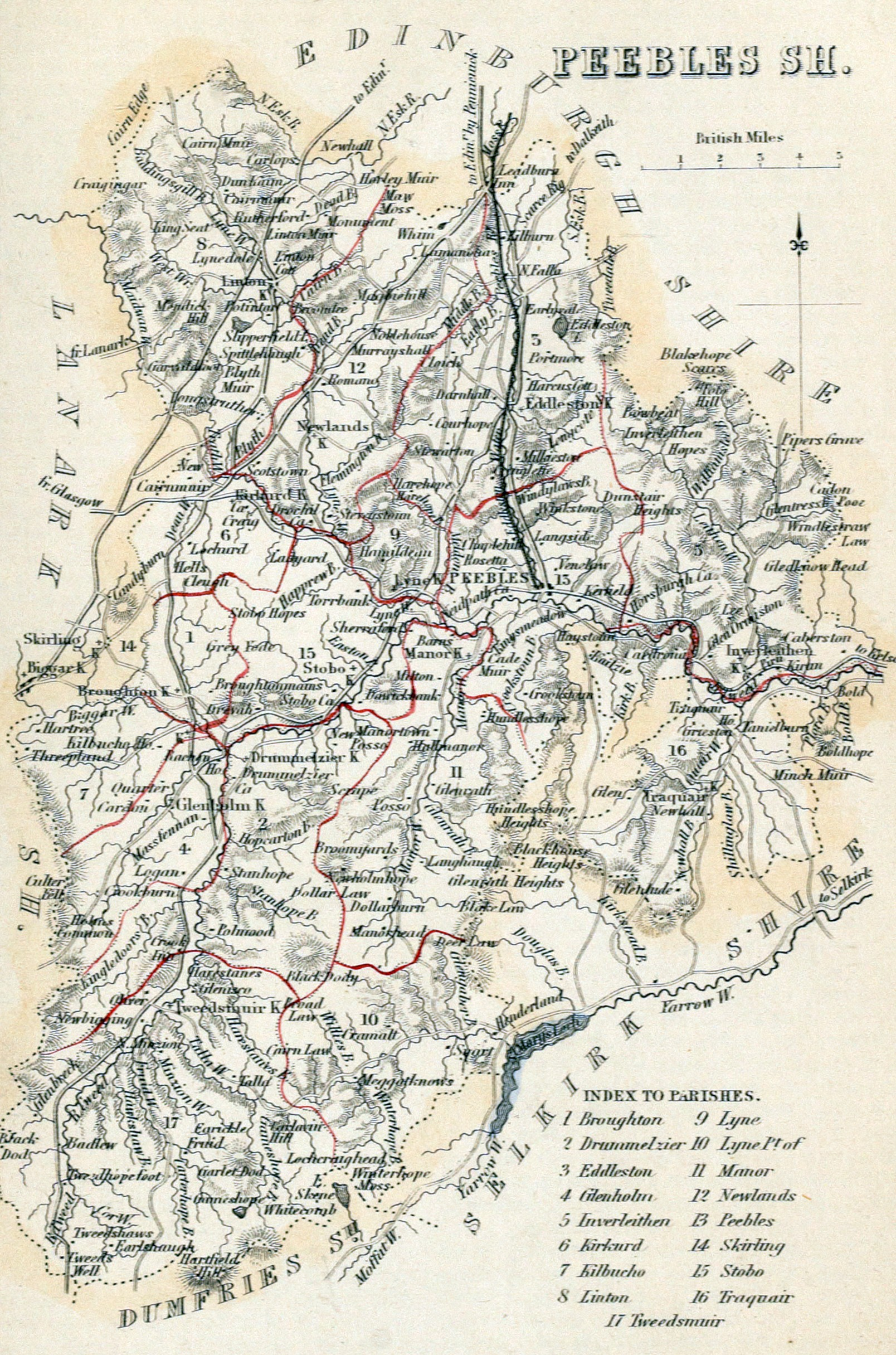
PEEBLESSHIRE Civil Parish map c. 1854. Boundaries are outlined in red

1. Broughton, Glenholm and Kilbucho (union of Broughton, Glenholm and Kilbucho in 1794)
2. Drumelzier
3. Eddleston
4. Innerleithen
5. Kirkurd
6. Linton or West Linton
7. Lyne (formerly Lyne and Megget; Megget, an ancient parish which was united to Lyne in 1621, was transferred to the Selkirkshire parish of Yarrow in 1891)
8. Manor
9. Newlands
10. Peebles
11. Skirling
12. Stobo
13. Traquair
14. Tweedsmuir (separated from Drumelzier in 1643)

The parish of Kailzie existed until 1674, when it was suppressed, parts going to Innerleithen and parts going to Traquair.

== Community councils ==
Community councils:

1. Carlops
2. Eddleston
3. Innerleithen and District
4. Lamancha, Newlands and Kirkurd
5. Manor, Stobo and Lyne
6. Royal Burgh of Peebles and District
7. Skirling
8. Tweedsmuir
9. Upper Tweed
10. Walkerburn
11. West Linton

== Gallery ==
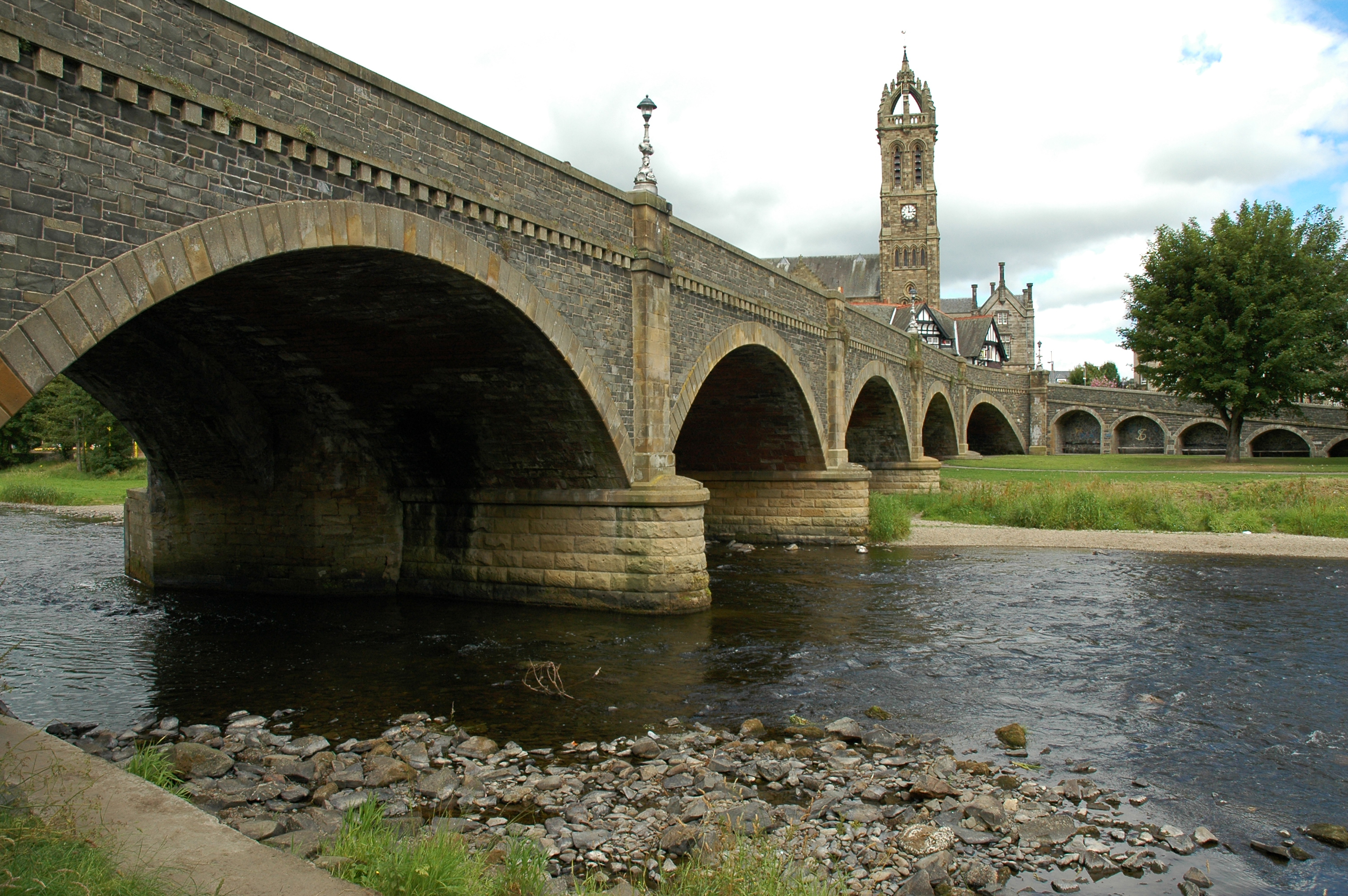
The Tweed Bridge and Peebles Old Parish Church

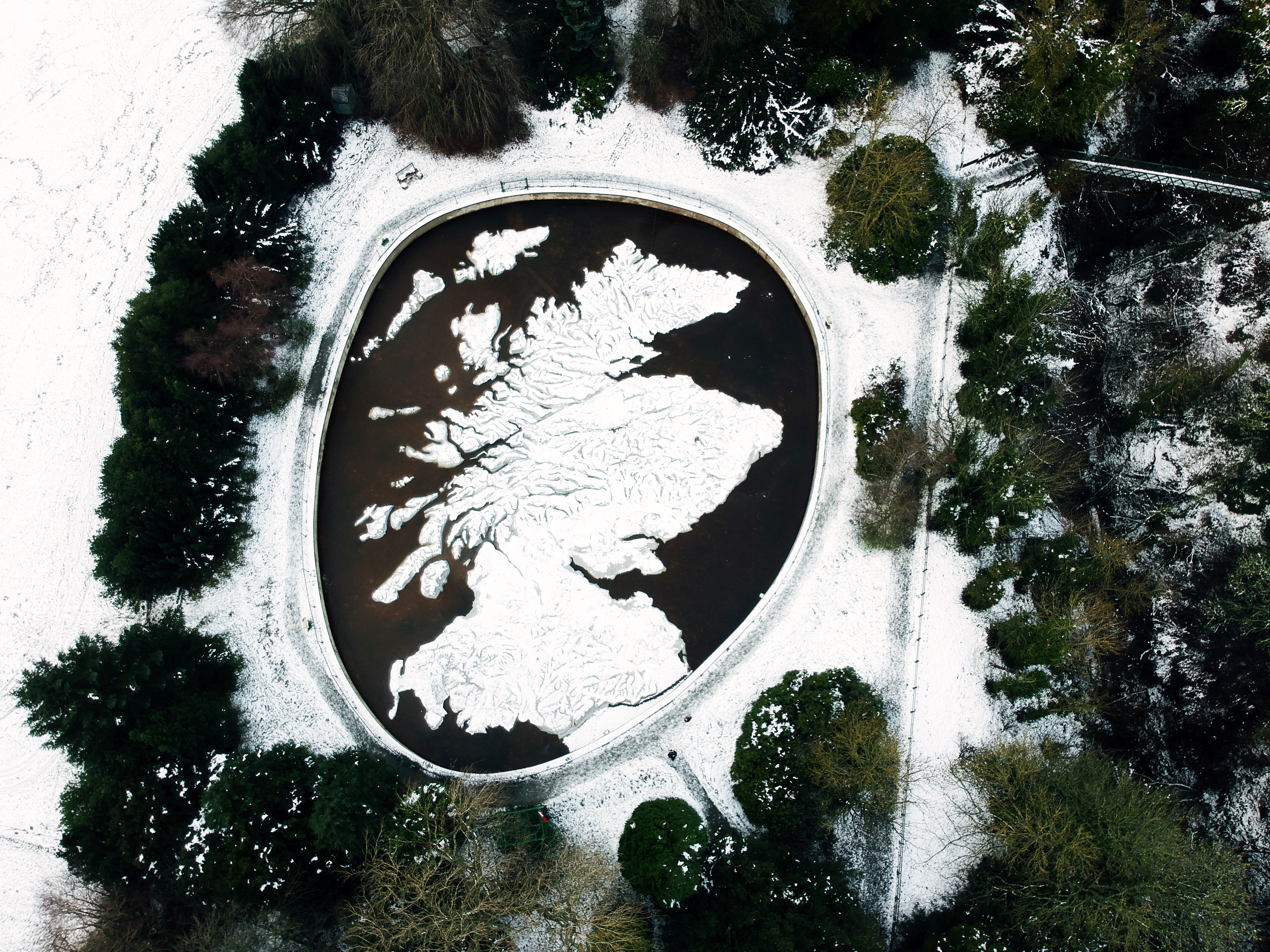
Great Polish Map of Scotland

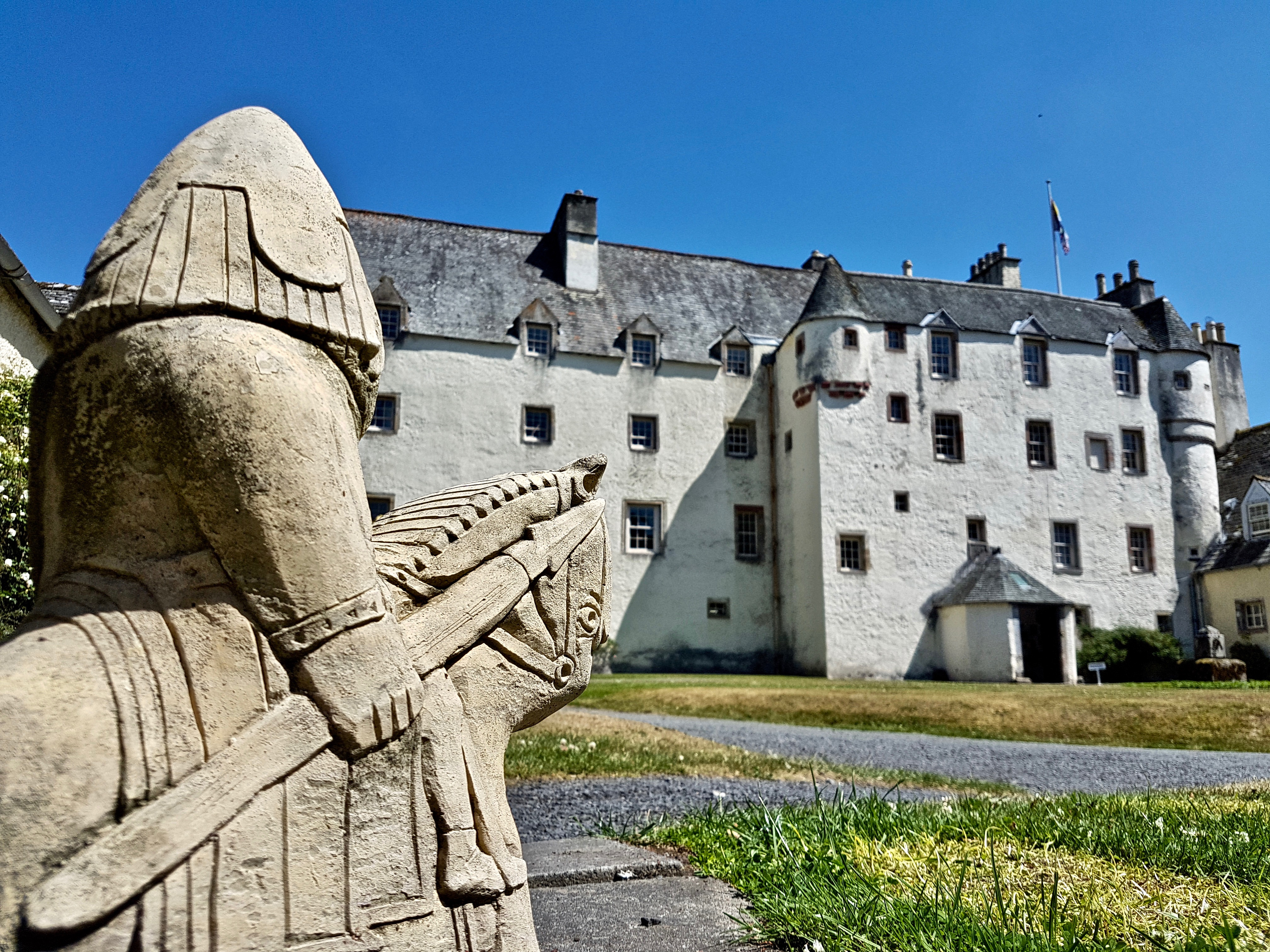
Traquair House

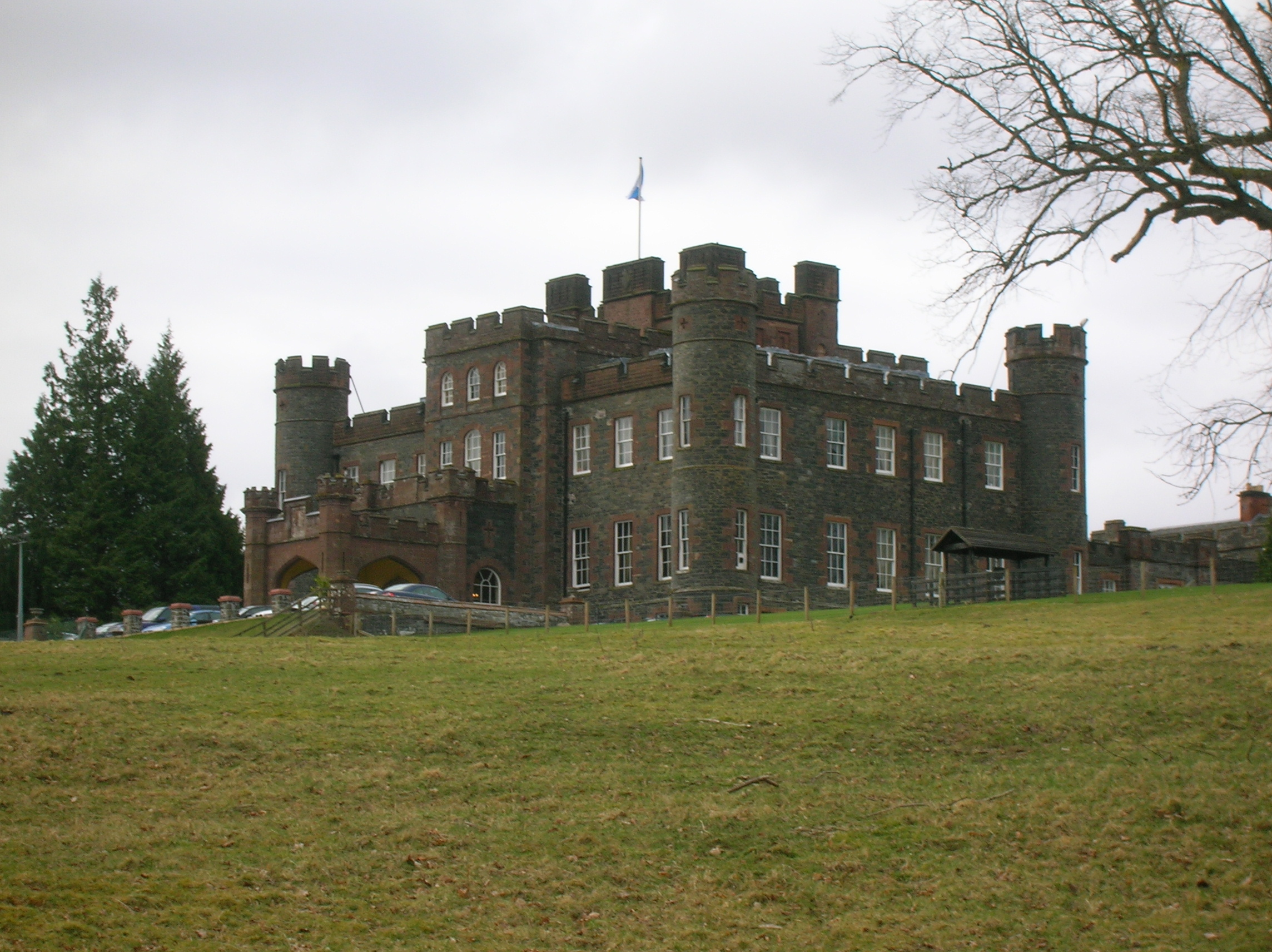
Stobo Castle

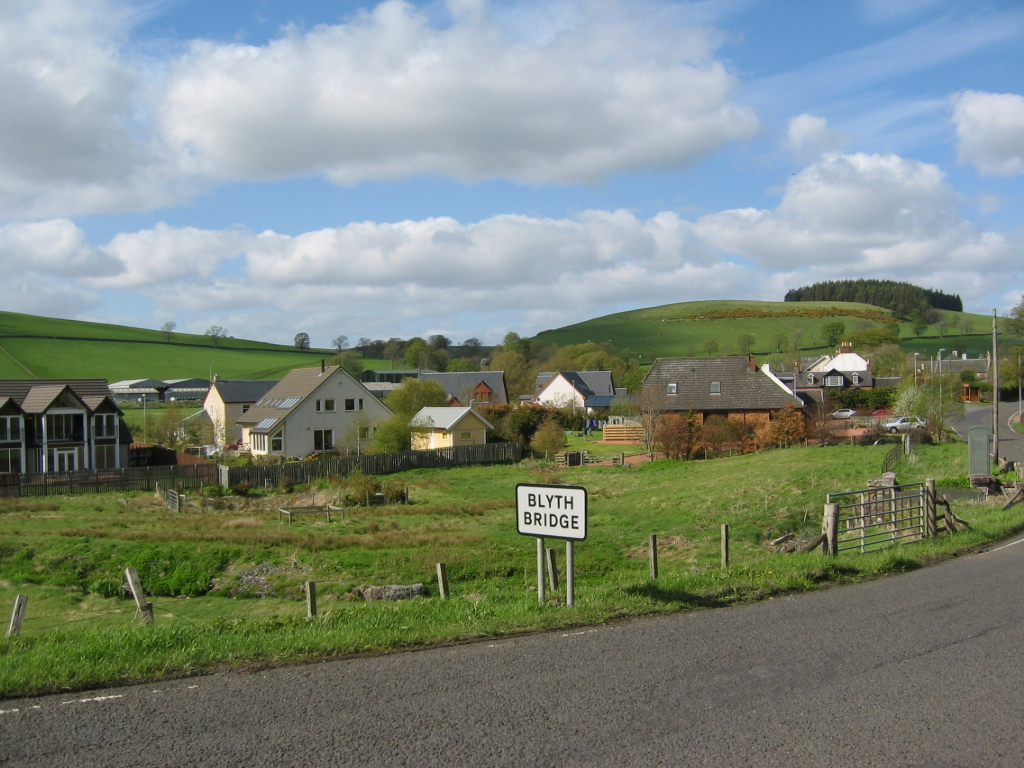
Blyth Bridge

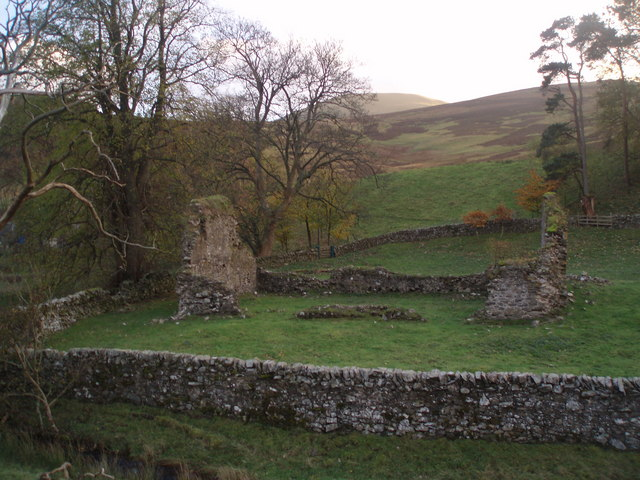
Ruins of the Church of Kilbucho

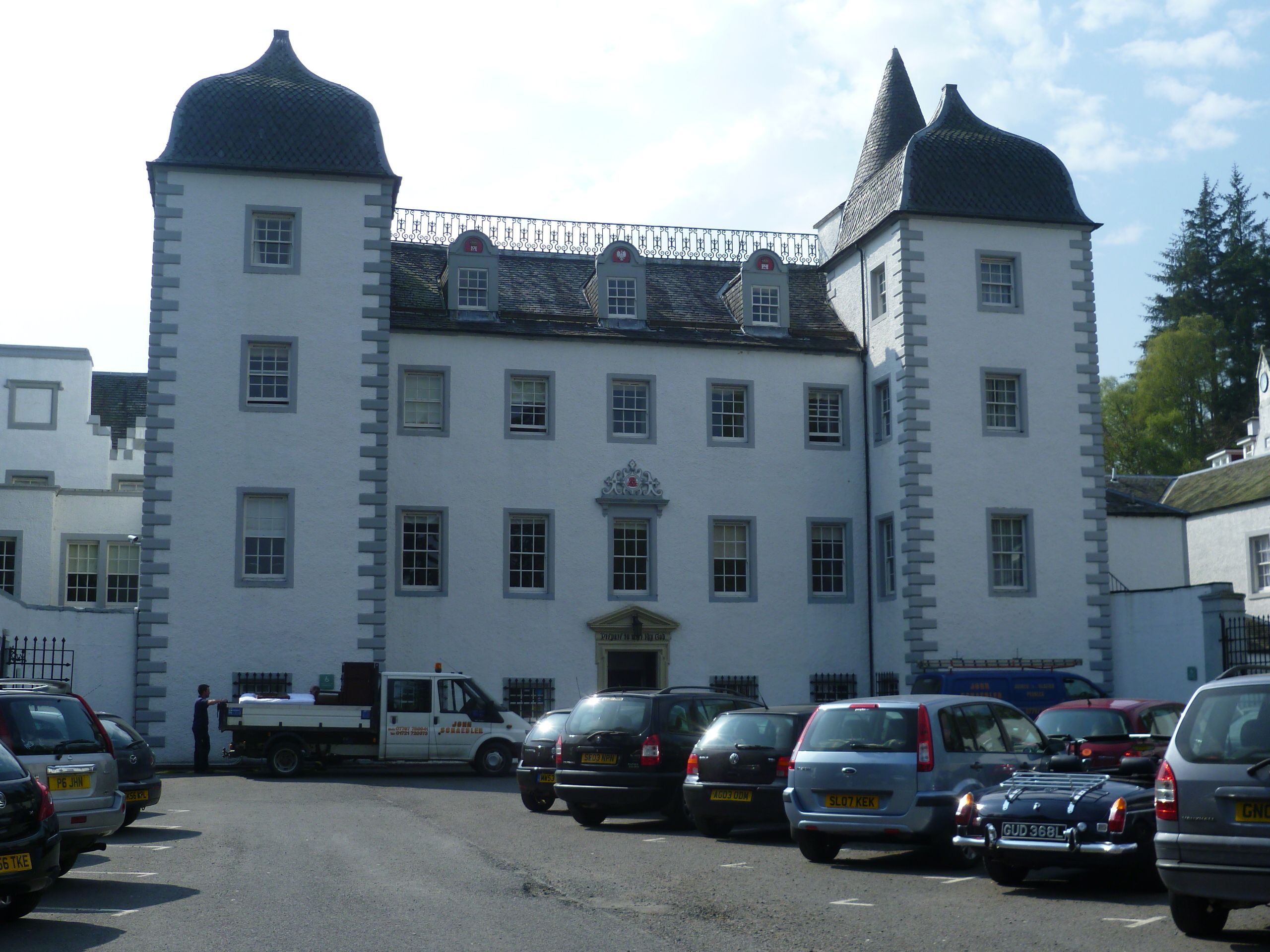
Barony Castle

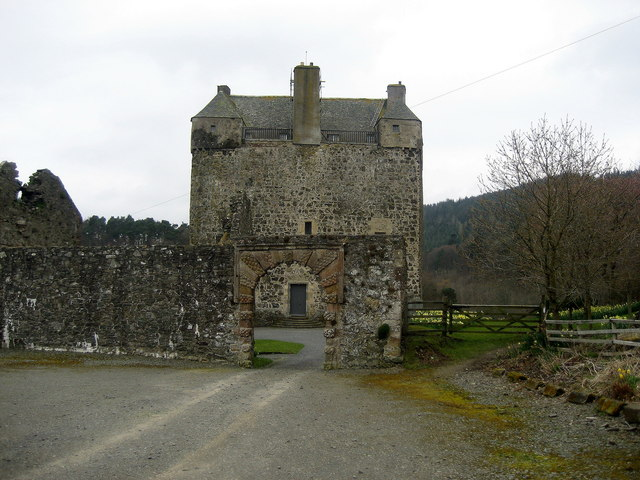
Neidpath Castle in Peebles
