= Tweeddale =

Scottish lieutenancy area

Coordinates: 55°45′N 3°15′W

- District (1975–1996); Lieutenancy Area (1975–)
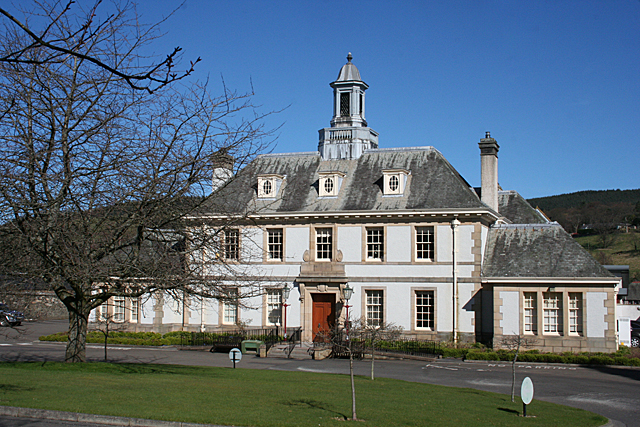
- Council Offices, Rosetta Road, Peebles

- Tweeddale district 1975–1996; Tweeddale lieutenancy area 1975–
- History
  - Created: 16 May 1975
  - Abolished: 31 March 1996
  - Succeeded by: Scottish Borders
  - HQ: Peebles
- Contained within
  - Region: Borders

Tweeddale (Scottish Gaelic: Srath Thuaidh/Tuaidhdail) is a committee area and lieutenancy area in the Scottish Borders council area in south-eastern Scotland. It had also been a province in the Middle Ages. From 1975 to 1996 it was a local government district. Its boundaries correspond to the historic county of Peeblesshire.

== Geography ==
The area had an estimated population of 20,848 in 2015. It is one of the five committee areas in the Scottish Borders. Major settlements in the area include Peebles, Innerleithen and West Linton.

It is the traditional name for the dale (the area drained) by the upper reaches of the River Tweed. This area was considered to end before the Yarrow Water flowed into the Tweed, so the area was bounded to the south and east by the Yarrow/Tweed watershed, and to the north and east by the Gala Water/Tweed watershed.

12,770 ha of upper Tweeddale between Broughton and Peebles is designated as the Upper Tweeddale National Scenic Area, one of 40 such areas in Scotland which are defined so as to identify areas of exceptional scenery and to ensure its protection from inappropriate development.

== History ==
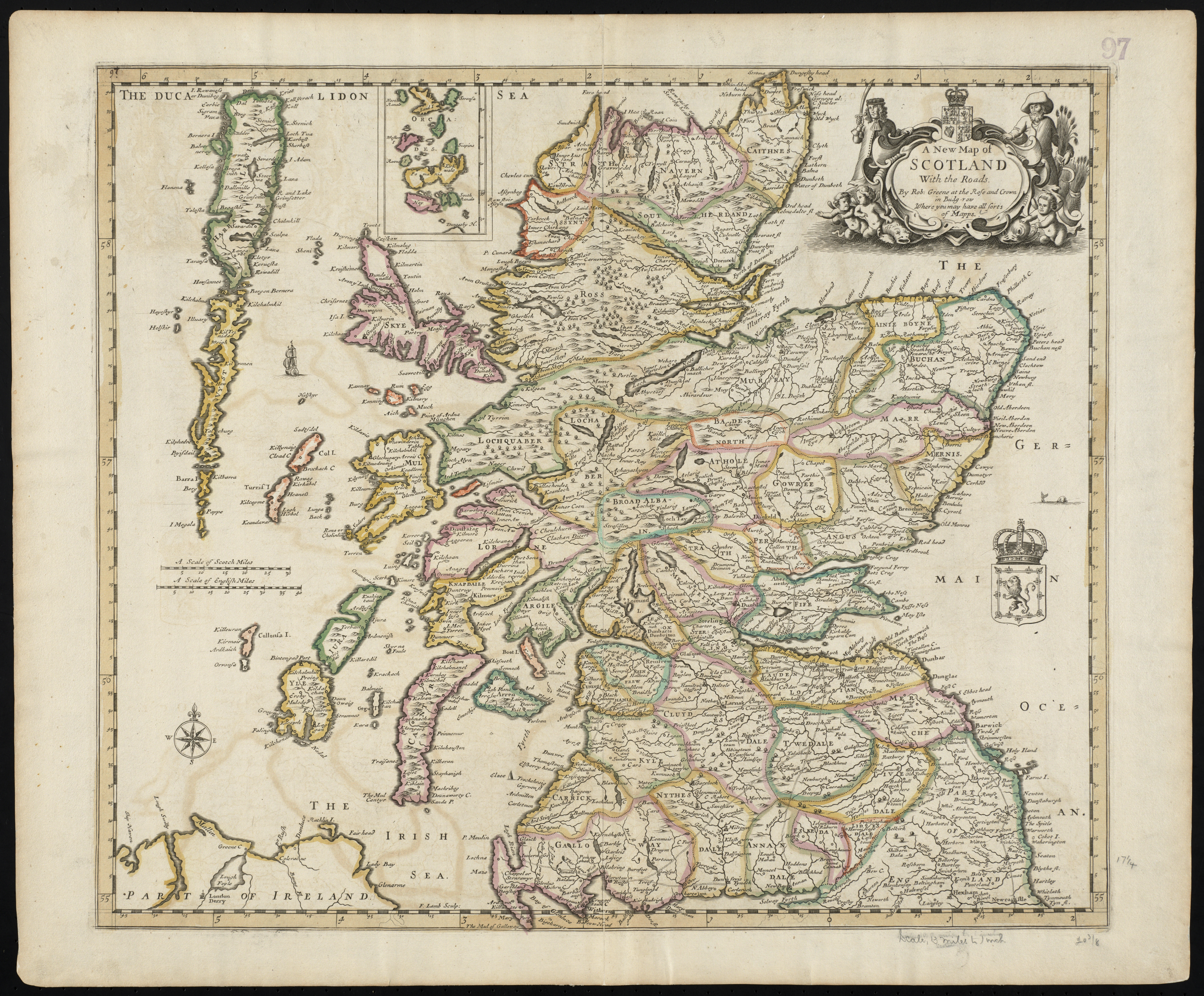
1689 map of Scotland showing "Twedale" as covering the combined area of Peeblesshire and Selkirkshire

Tweeddale was a historic district or province in the Middle Ages, bordering Teviotdale and the Marches to the east, Liddesdale and Annandale to the south, Clydesdale to the west and Lothian to the north. From the twelfth century the area was divided into sheriffdoms. The southern part of Tweeddale became the sheriffdom of Selkirkshire, also known as Ettrick Forest, whilst the northern part of Tweeddale was initially divided into two sheriffdoms, based at Peebles and Traquair, before those two were united as the single shire of Peebles, or Peeblesshire, around 1304. From then on the shires gradually became the more important areas for administration; the old provinces were not abolished as such, but their importance diminished.

== Tweeddale District ==
Local government reorganisation in 1975 under the Local Government (Scotland) Act 1973 introduced a two-tier structure of local government across Scotland comprising upper-tier regions and lower-tier districts. Peeblesshire County Council was abolished and the area became part of the Borders region. The region was divided into four districts, one of which was called Tweeddale, covering the same area as pre-1975 Peeblesshire. The new Tweeddale district took over the functions of the six former districts of Peeblesshire, which were all abolished at the same time:

- Broughton District
- Innerleithen Burgh
- Innerleithen District
- Linton District
- Peebles Royal Burgh
- Peebles District

For lieutenancy purposes, the last lord-lieutenant of the county of Peeblesshire was made the first Lord Lieutenant of Tweeddale when the reforms came into effect in 1975.

The Borders region and its four districts, including Tweeddale, were abolished in 1996, merging to form the present Scottish Borders council area. The area of the pre-1996 Tweeddale district continues to be used as a lieutenancy area.

=== Political control ===
The first election to Tweeddale District Council was held in 1974, initially operating as a shadow authority alongside the outgoing authorities until it came into its powers on 16 May 1975. Throughout the council's existence a majority of the seats were held by independents:

Party in control	Years
Independent	1975–1996

=== Premises ===
The council was based at the Council Offices on Rosetta Road in Peebles. The building had originally been built in 1856 as a workhouse, but had been extensively rebuilt and extended in 1935 to become the headquarters of Peeblesshire County Council. After the 1996 reforms the building became an area office for Scottish Borders Council and a police station.

== See also ==
- History of local government in the United Kingdom
- Marquess of Tweeddale
