= Upper Tweeddale National Scenic Area =

Protected area in Scottish Borders, Scotland

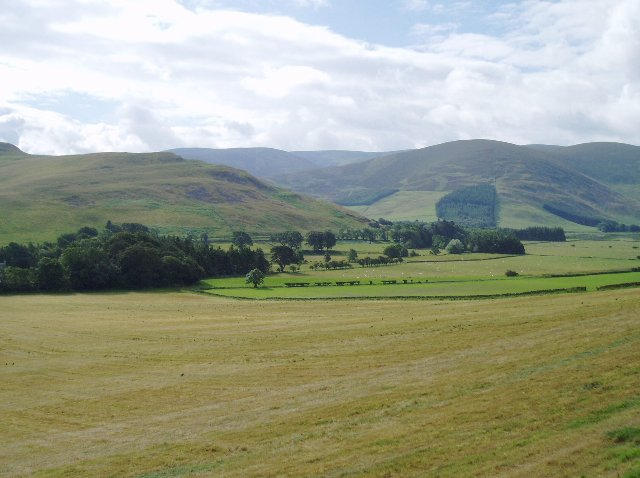
- Farmland in the valley of the Manor Water.

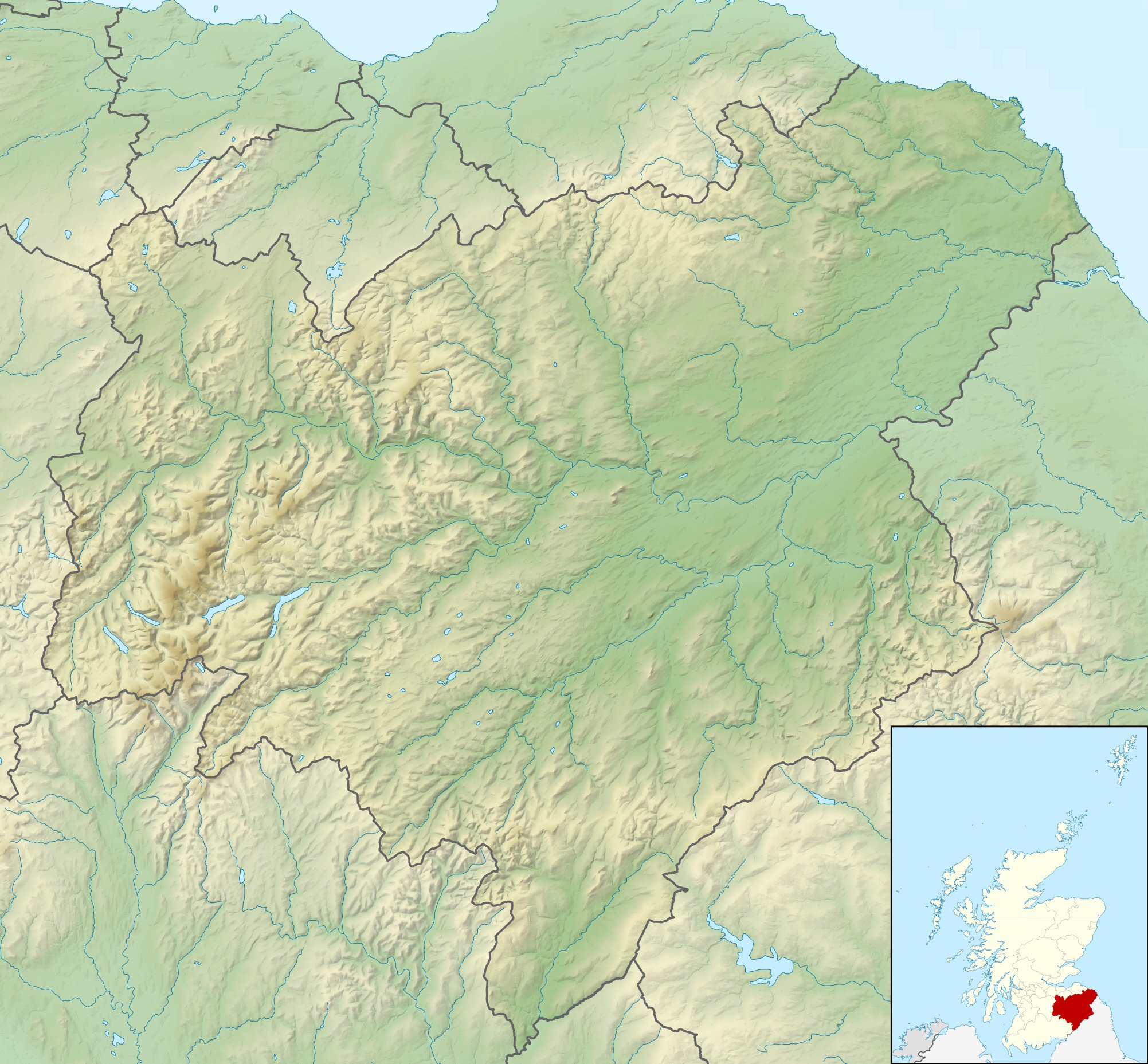
- Location within Scottish Borders
- Location: Scottish Borders, Scotland
- Coordinates: 55.616506°N 3.314601°W
- Area: 128 km^{2} (49 sq mi)
- Established: 1981
- Governing body: NatureScot

The Upper Tweeddale National Scenic Area lies in the Borders region of Scotland. It is one of 40 national scenic areas (NSA) in Scotland, which are defined so as to identify areas of exceptional scenery and to ensure their protection from inappropriate development. The designated area covers 12,770 ha (49 square miles) of countryside surrounding the upper reaches of the River Tweed between Broughton and Peebles.

National scenic areas are designated primarily to recognise the scenic qualities of an area, but sometimes also e.g. its culture, history, archaeology, geology or wildlife. Areas with such qualities may be protected via other national and international designations that overlap with the NSA designation. There are two Sites of Special Scientific Interest (SSSI) within the designated area of the Upper Tweeddale NSA.

Although the national scenic area designation provides a degree of additional protection via the planning process, there are no bodies equivalent to a national park authority, and whilst local authorities (in this case Scottish Borders Council) can produce a management strategy for each one, only the three national scenic areas within Dumfries and Galloway currently have management strategies.

== Creation of the national scenic area ==
Following the Second World War, a committee, chaired by Sir Douglas Ramsay, was established to consider preservation of the landscape in Scotland. The report, published in 1945, proposed that five areas (Loch Lomond and the Trossachs, the Cairngorms, Glen Coe-Ben Nevis-Black Mount, Wester Ross and Glen Strathfarrar-Glen Affric-Glen Cannich) should receive a level of protection. Accordingly, the government designated these areas as "national park direction areas", giving powers for planning decisions taken by local authorities to be reviewed by central government. Following a further review of landscape protection in 1978, additional areas, including the area of the current Upper Tweeddale NSA, were identified as worthy of protection due to their landscape qualities. Accordingly, in 1981 the direction areas were replaced by the national scenic area designation, which was based on the 1978 recommendations and thus included this area. The defined area remains as originally mapped in 1978, but was redesignated under new legislation in 2010.

== Description ==
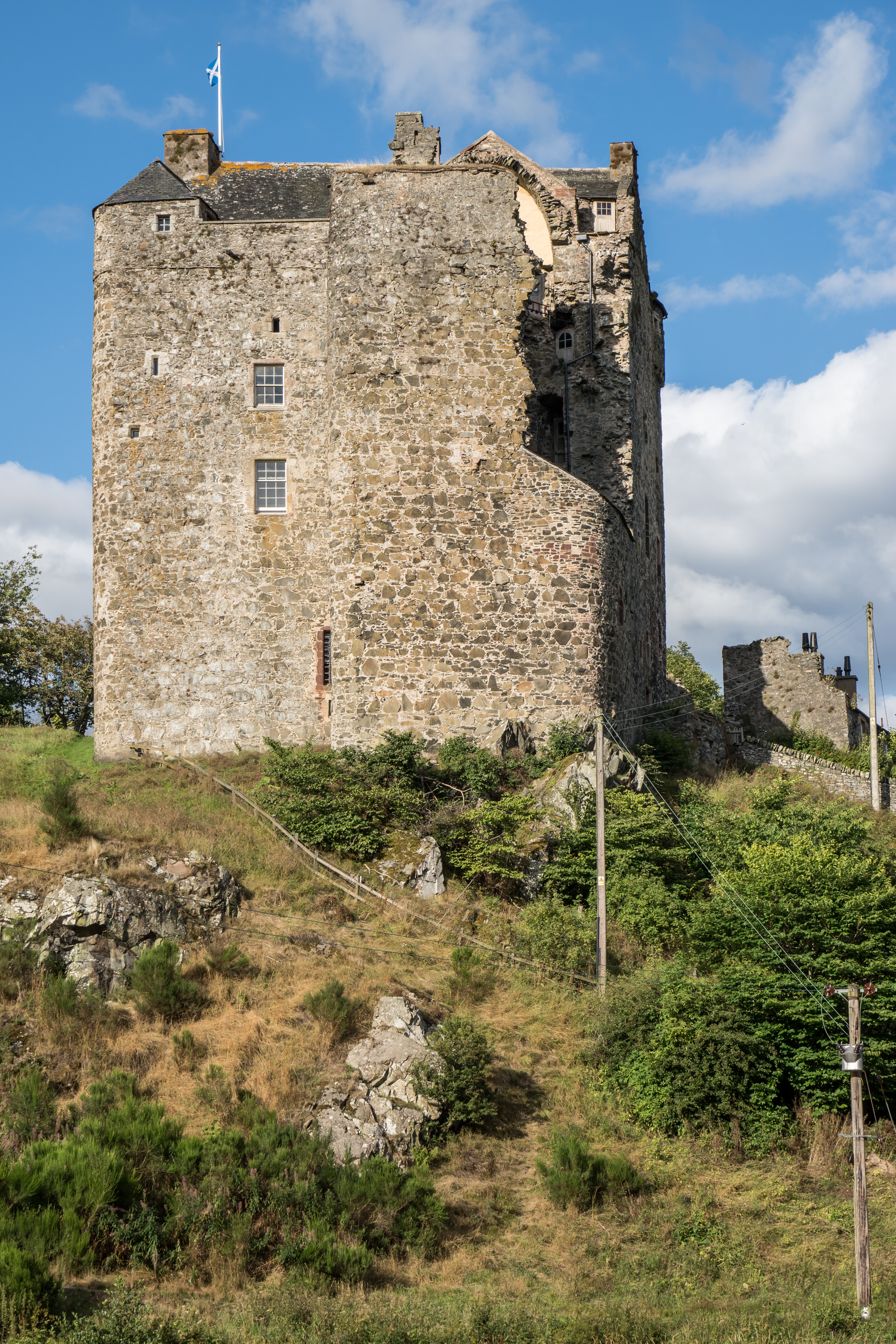
Neidpath Castle.

The original 1978 report that led to the area being designated as a national scenic area noted:

The upper course of the River Tweed is contained in a narrow steepsided valley flanked by rounded hills of considerable stature. The general sense of containment created by the narrow valley is given interest and variety by the inter-relationship of woodlands, sometimes shelterbelt, hedgerow or plantation, and both deciduous and coniferous, with farmland which ranges from roughgrazing on the hill, through parkland, pasture and arable to riverside meadows. The valley floor widens at each of the confluences of the Holm, Lyne and Manor Waters to give longer views into these tributary glens and the higher summits at their heads, and then narrows again at Neidpath where the castle guards the defile between Caedmuir and the Meldons. The river itself contributes greatly to the scene, winding through its haughlands with a majesty that assumes a greater magnitude than it really possesses. The dale is ornamented with castles, mansions, kirks and prosperous farmhouses, and the hill marked with the innumerable remains of ancient occupation.

— Scottish Natural Heritage (1978)

Historic features of the area include the hill fort at Dreva Craig, Barns Tower, and the castles at Stobo, Neidpath and Tinnis. The John Buchan Way, a 22 km walking route between Broughton and Peebles, passes through the area.

== Conservation designations ==
The River Tweed (including tributaries such as the Manor Water and the Holm Water) is designated as a Special Area of Conservation, holding important populations of salmon, brook lamprey, river lamprey, sea lamprey and otter. The river has a very diverse ecology due to the mixed geology of its catchment area, and is also designated as a Site of Special Scientific Interest (SSSI). There is a further SSSI within the boundaries of the NSA, the Tweedsmuir Hills, which form the largest area of mountain plateau in Scotland outwith the Highlands, and which hosts nationally important populations of breeding birds, mosses, liverworts and arctic–alpine plants. The grounds surrounding Barns Tower and Stobo Castle, and Dawyck Botanic Garden, are listed in the Inventory of Gardens and Designed Landscapes in Scotland.
