= Stobo =

Stobo may refer to:

Locations

- Stobo, Scottish Borders, Scotland, see List of listed buildings in Stobo, Scottish Borders
- Stobo Castle, Scotland
- Stobo Kirk, Scotland
- Stobo railway station, Scotland
- Barony of Stobo, Scotland

People

- Charlie Stobo, Australian cricketer
- Richard Stobo, Australian cricketer
- Robert Stobo, Scottish-American soldier
