= John Douglas of Broughton =

Scottish politician

Hon. John Douglas of Broughton (c. 1698 – 16 March 1732) of Broughton, Peebles, was a Scottish politician who sat in the British House of Commons from 1722 to 1732.

Douglas was the second son of William Douglas, 1st Earl of March and his wife Lady Jane Hay, second daughter of John Hay, 1st Marquess of Tweeddale. In 1719, he purchased the estate of Broughton.

Douglas was returned unopposed as Member of Parliament for Peeblesshire at the 1722 British general election on the interest of his brother, the 2nd Earl of March. He was returned after a contest at the 1727 British general election. He consistently voted with the Administration.

Following the death of his brother William, 2nd Earl of March, in 1731, John Douglas was appointed guardian to his seven-year-old nephew, William, 3rd Earl of March, who later became the 4th Duke of Queensberry.

Douglas died, unmarried, on 16 March 1732. He was so deeply in debt that his estates were sold in 1736 to pay his creditors.

Parliament of Great Britain
Preceded by Alexander Murray	Member of Parliament for Peeblesshire; 1722–1732	Succeeded by Sir James Naesmyth, Bt
