= John Buchan Way =

Walking path in Scotland, UK

Coordinates: 55.635153°N 3.211011°W

The John Buchan Way is a walking route from Peebles to Broughton in the Scottish Borders, a distance of approximately 22 km (13 miles). The route is waymarked in both directions, and was opened in spring 2003. It is named after the writer and diplomat John Buchan (1875–1940), who has many associations with the area. The route mainly follows long-established hill tracks through the Peeblesshire countryside. It has three main ascents and descents which give a total climb of about 800 metres, but this climb is never severe. The walk can be completed in one day by strong walkers, or can conveniently be split.

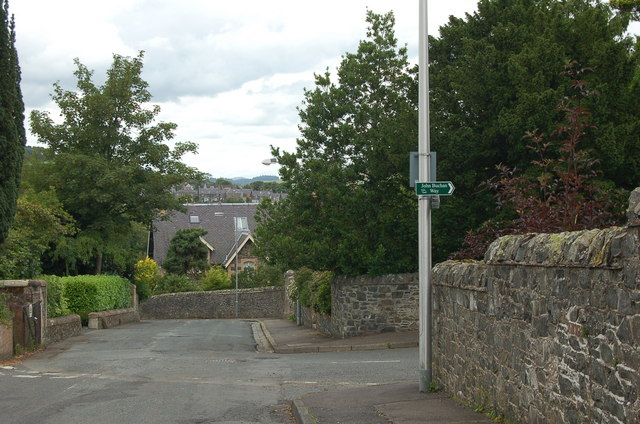
Chambers Terrace in Peebles at the start of the walk

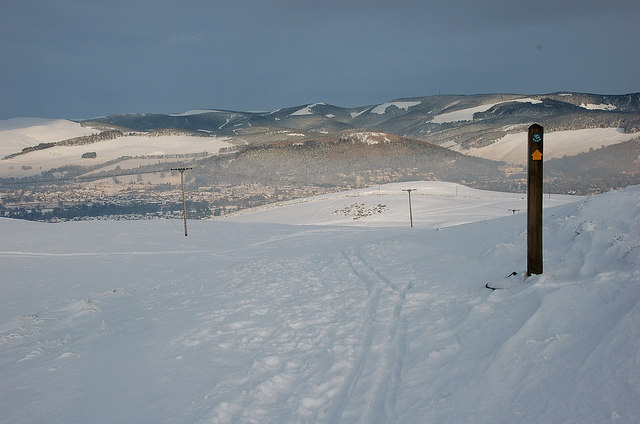
A wintry scene on Cademuir Hill

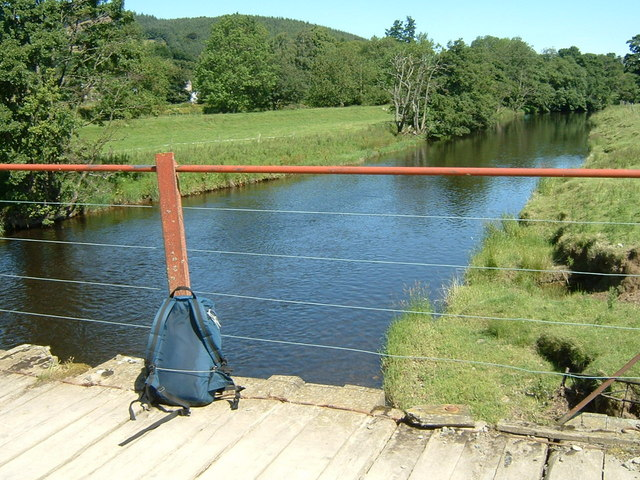
Bridge over the River Tweed at Stobo

== Route ==
The walk starts from the west end of Peebles High Street. Later the walk passes the summit of Cademuir Hill where, on a clear day, there are excellent views. Another viewing point is at the head of Glensax. The walk can be terminated at Stobo which is around the halfway point. From here it is possible to catch a bus back to Peebles. For those wishing a longer walk the path passes Stobo Kirk following the Easton Burn and later crossing it on a bridge. Penvalla hill is on the right. Eventually the highest point of the walk is reached above Stobo Hopehead, surely one of the most remote houses in the Scottish Borders, 6 km (4 miles) up a track from the road. The path then descends to the village of Broughton. The walk finishes at the John Buchan Centre at the south end of the village. A detailed description of the route and a map can be downloaded from the Scottish Borders Council website.

== Nearby attractions ==
Several places of interest can be easily reached from this walk. These include: Stobo Kirk, The forts on Cademuir Hill, John Buchan Centre, Neidpath Castle, Broughton Gallery and Dawyck Botanic Garden.

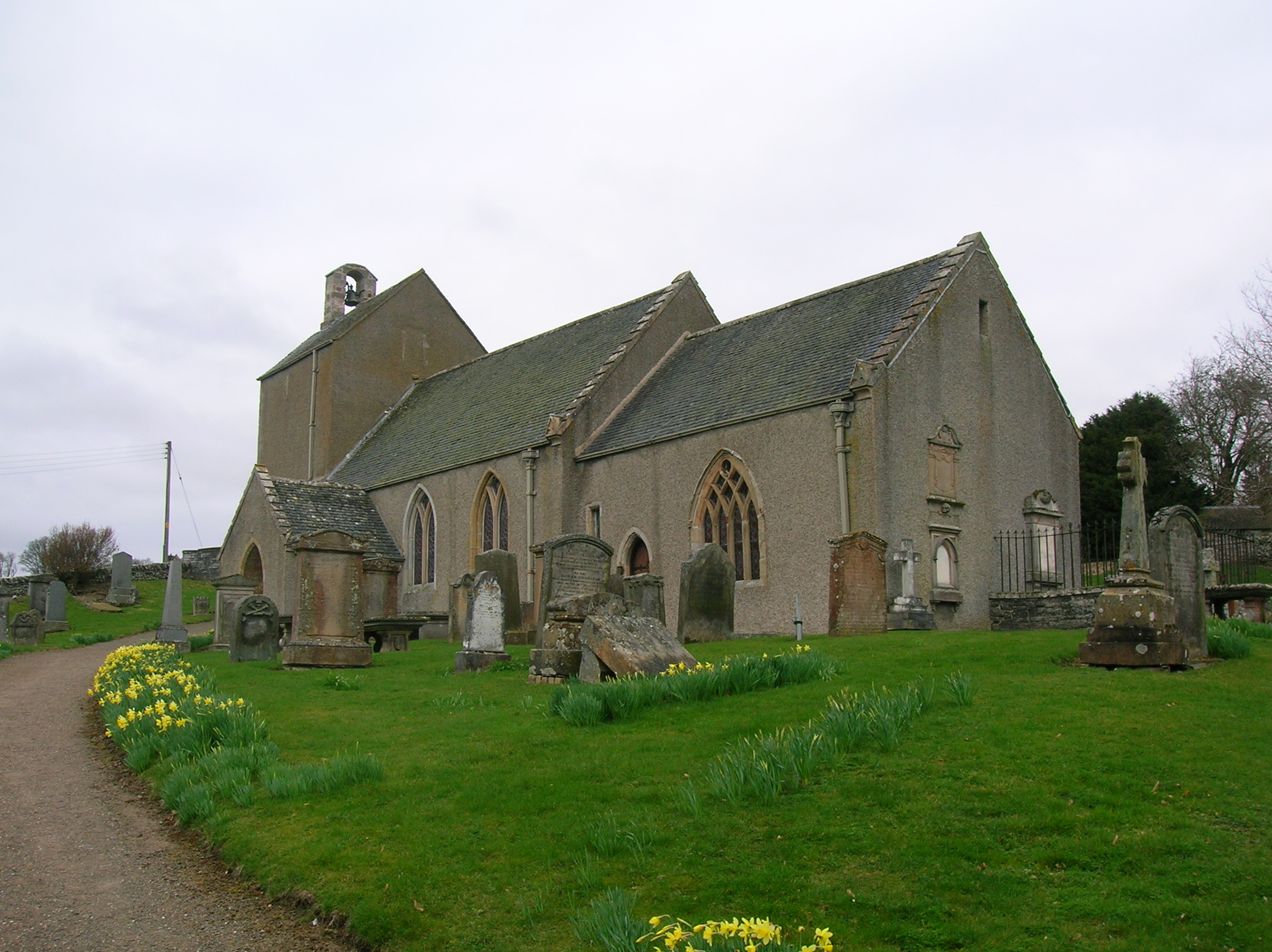
The halfway point on the walk - Stobo Kirk

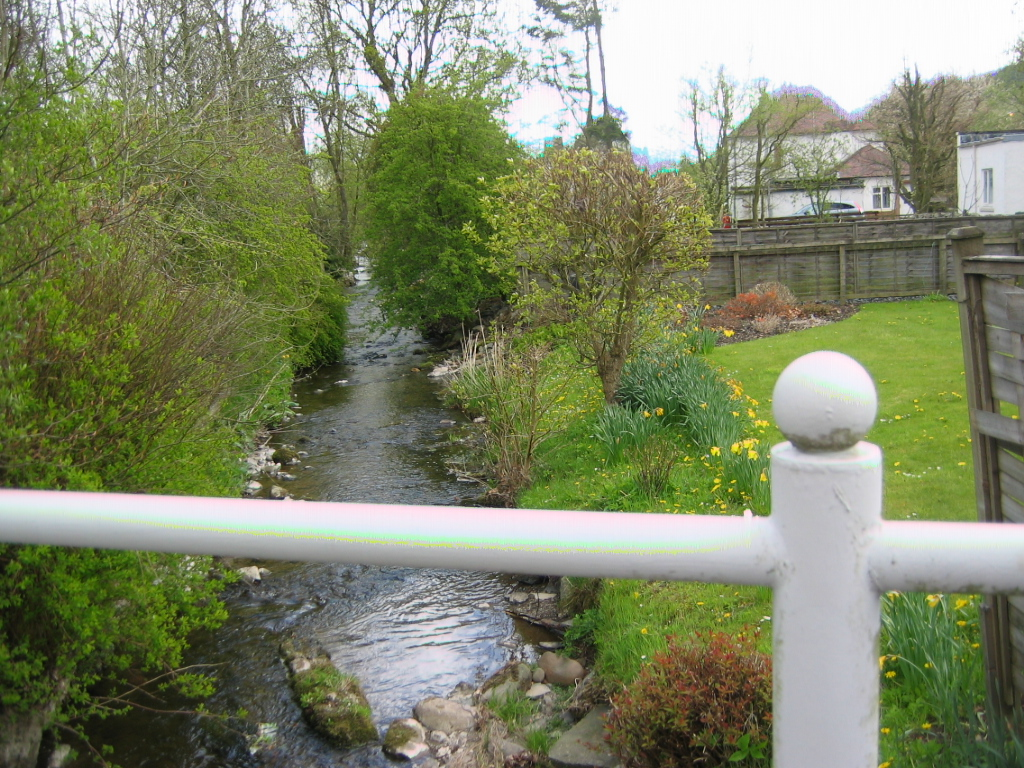
The walk finishes in Broughton
