= Dawyck House =

Historic house in the Scottish Borders area of Scotland

Coordinates: 55.6035°N 3.3208°W

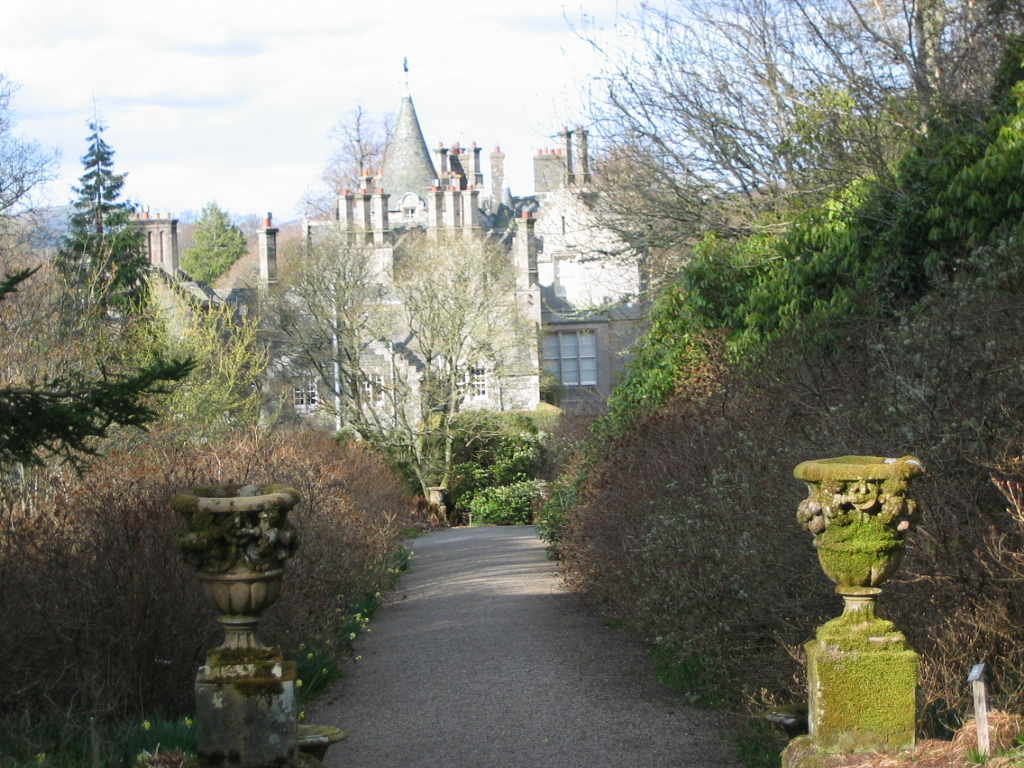
Dawyck House

Dawyck House is a historic house at Dawyck, in the parish of Drumelzier in the former Peeblesshire, in the Scottish Borders area of Scotland. The alternative name is 'Dalwick House'. Canmore ID 49816.

Dawyck Castle was built about the thirteenth century and belonged to the Veitch family until 1691 when it was purchased by Sir James Nasmyth. In 1897 the estate and barony passed to the Balfours. Dawyck was demolished in 1830 and the Dawyck House mansion was erected on the same footprint. The current house has been protected as a Category B listed building since 23 February 1971 and the grounds were added to the Inventory of Gardens and Designed Landscapes in Scotland in 1987.

Dawyck (together with Stobo Castle) were the first Scottish sites to introduce the non-native species of horse chestnut in 1650.

The grounds of the house are now operated as Dawyck Botanic Garden, a "regional garden" of the Royal Botanic Garden Edinburgh. Dawyck Chapel is in the grounds of the botanic garden.

== See also ==
- List of places in the Scottish Borders
- List of places in Scotland
