= Dawyck Chapel =

Chapel in Scotland

Coordinates: 55.6009°N 3.3220°W

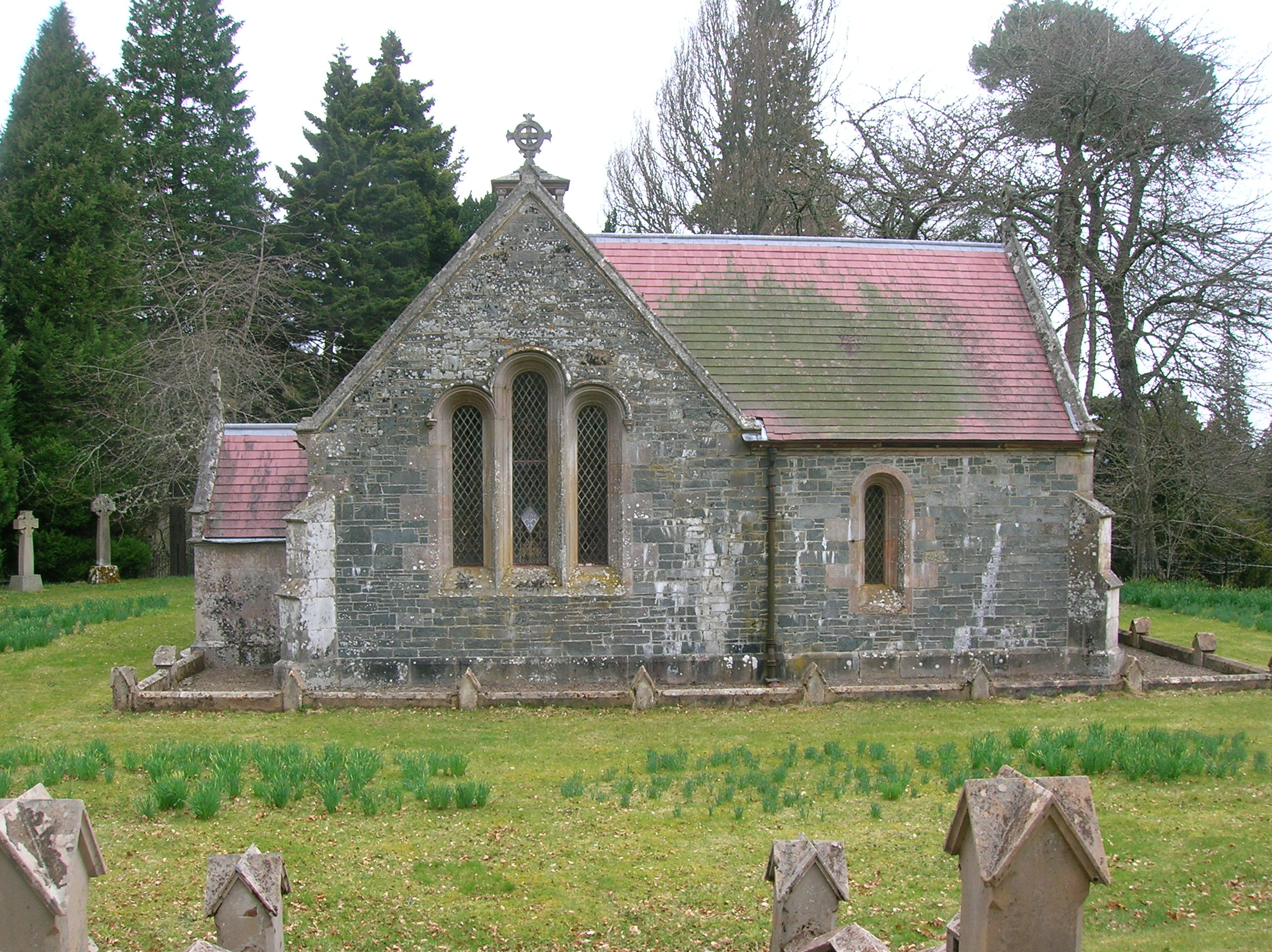
Dawyck Chapel

Dawyck Chapel, also known as Dalwick Church, is located (NGR NT 16798 34933) within the Parish of Drumelzier in the Scottish Borders area of Scotland. The chapel lies within the Dawyck Botanic Gardens, an outstation or "regional garden" of the Royal Botanic Garden Edinburgh, some eight miles (13 km) south west of Peebles on the B712 and a similar distance south east of Biggar.

== History ==
=== Owners of the Dawyck estate ===
The Veitch family owned the Dawyck estate from 1491 to 1691. In 1691 the Naesmyth family took over the estate in the person of Sir James Naesmyth, 2nd Baronet of Dawyck and Posso (1704–1779); his grandson was Sir John Murray Naesmyth (1803–1876). In 1897 the estate was purchased by Mrs Alexander Balfour; her grandson, Colonel A.N. Balfour sold most of the property, but donated the gardens to the nation in 1978.

=== Chapel history ===
The name is also given as 'Dawic', and 'Dauwic' in circa 1200. It may derive from the Gaelic for an ox and the Old English 'wic' for a camp or dwelling. The suggested derivation from 'Davach' is more likely in the case of the nearby 'Davar', which, in the old Gaelic system of land measures, was an area of land equal to 32 ox-gates or 416 acres (1.68 km^{2}). Until the Reformation (1598) it had been a chapelry of Stobo Parish, becoming an independent parish soon after, being suppressed in 1742. Sir James Naesmyth, second Baronet, was responsible for this economy measure and the church's stipend was added to that of the parishes of Stobo and Drumelzier.

Sir James Naesmyth, third Baronet, acquired in 1789 the old glebe of the parish from the ministers of Stobo and Drumelzier. The 4-acre (16,000 m^{2}) glebe, which lay south-west of the church, carried pasturage rights for a horse, two cows, and forty sheep. Dawyck church lands, under reservation of the glebe, were feued in 1580 by Robert Douglas, titled the 'perpetual vicar' of Stobo, with consent of the archbishop, dean and chapter of Glasgow, to John Tweedie, tutor of Drumelzier, and are described as the vicarage lands of Dayik, with the pasturage of 38 soums of sheep; reserving four acres of land and the manse to the reader of the church. The feu-duty was five merks yearly. Marion Tweedie, John's daughter, by Crown charter dated 4 February 1606, was invested in the lands.

In 1837 the ruins were demolished by the lawyer Sir John Murray Naesmyth to make way for the present chapel, also used as the family mausoleum. The chapel still contains a probable medieval font, and the chapel bell is said to carry a date of 1642, being recast in 1791.

The chapel remains private property, but is still used for weddings.

== Views of the chapel and gardens ==
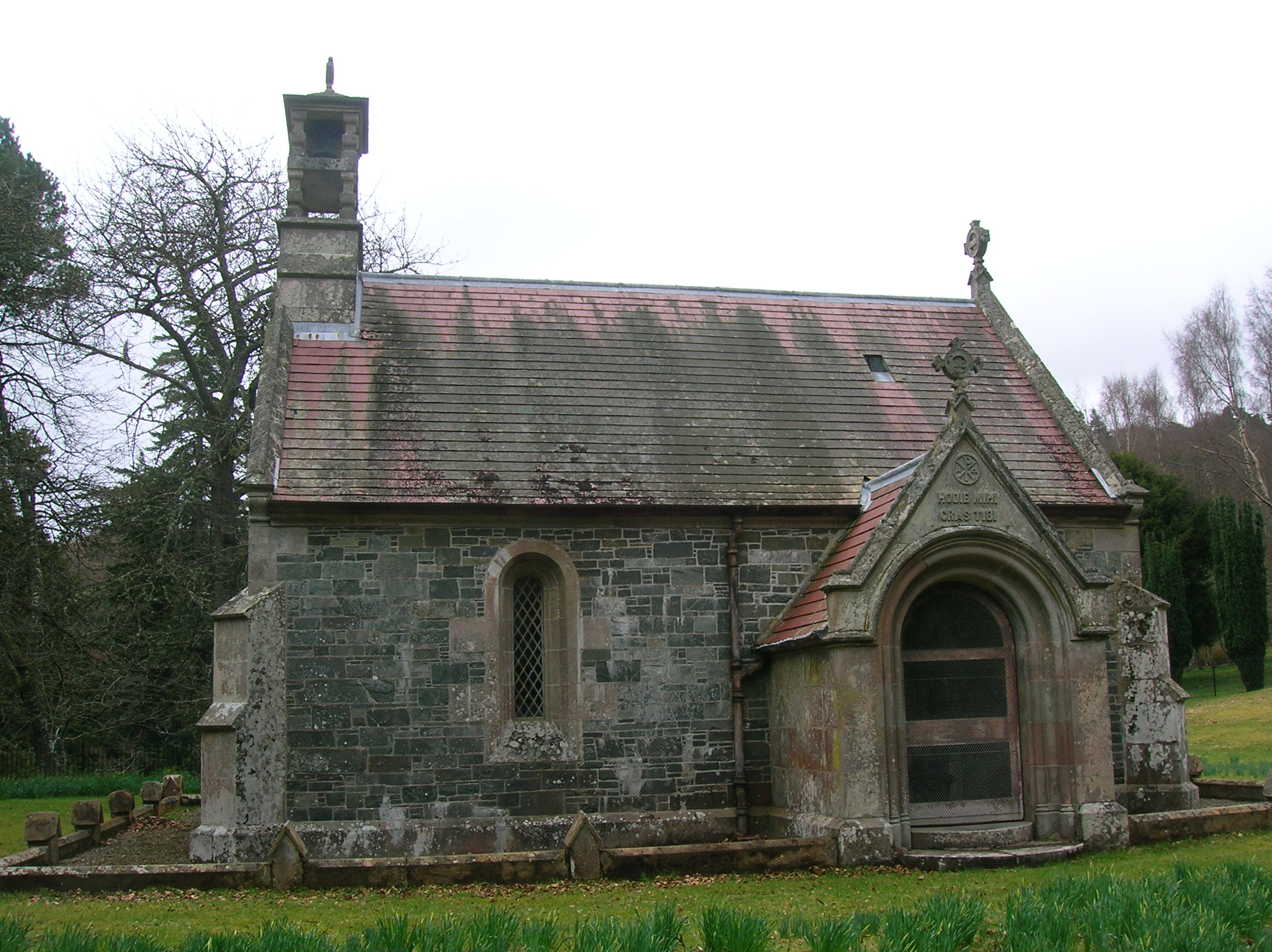
The porch and belfry.

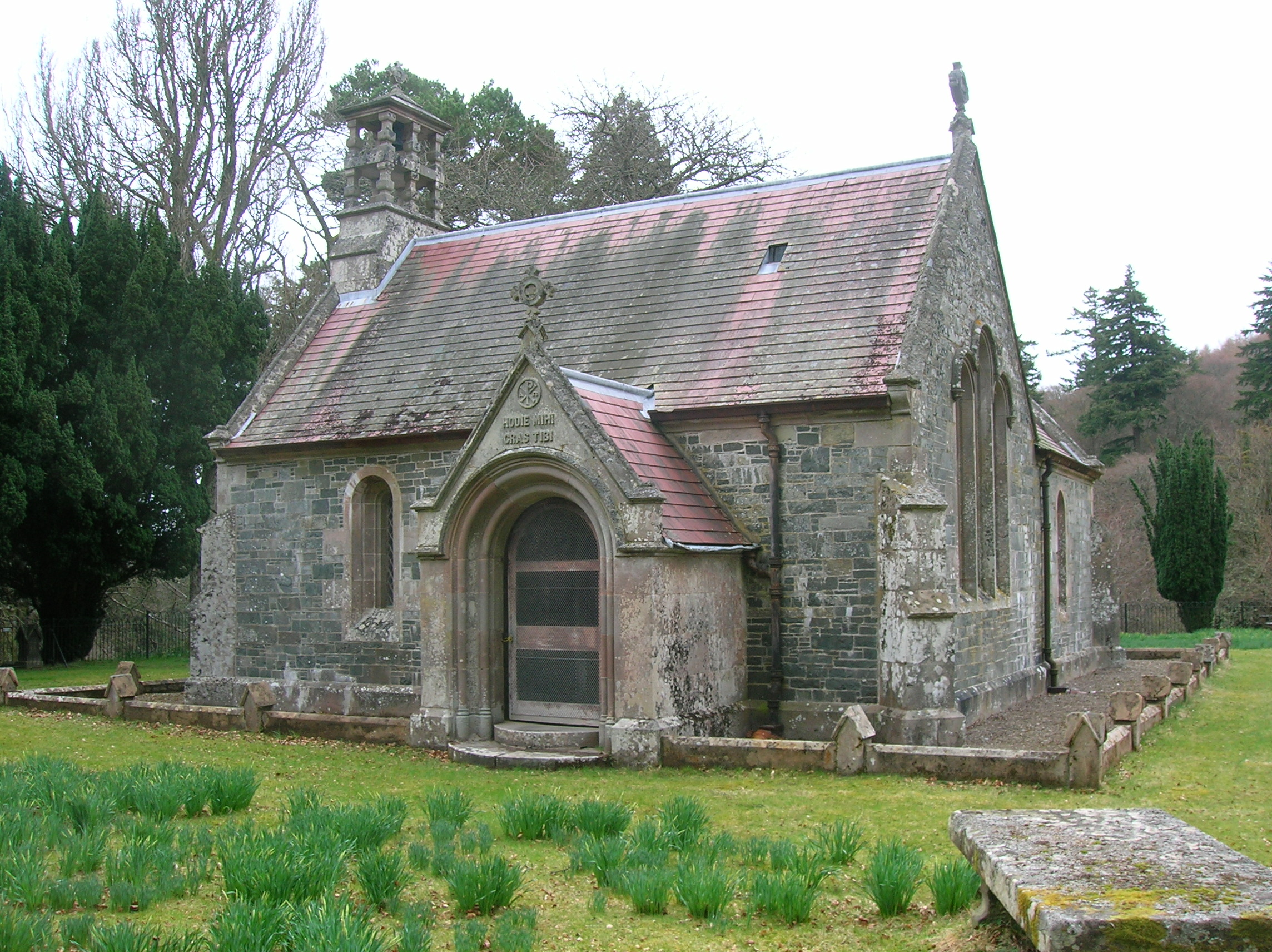
The chapel and porch.

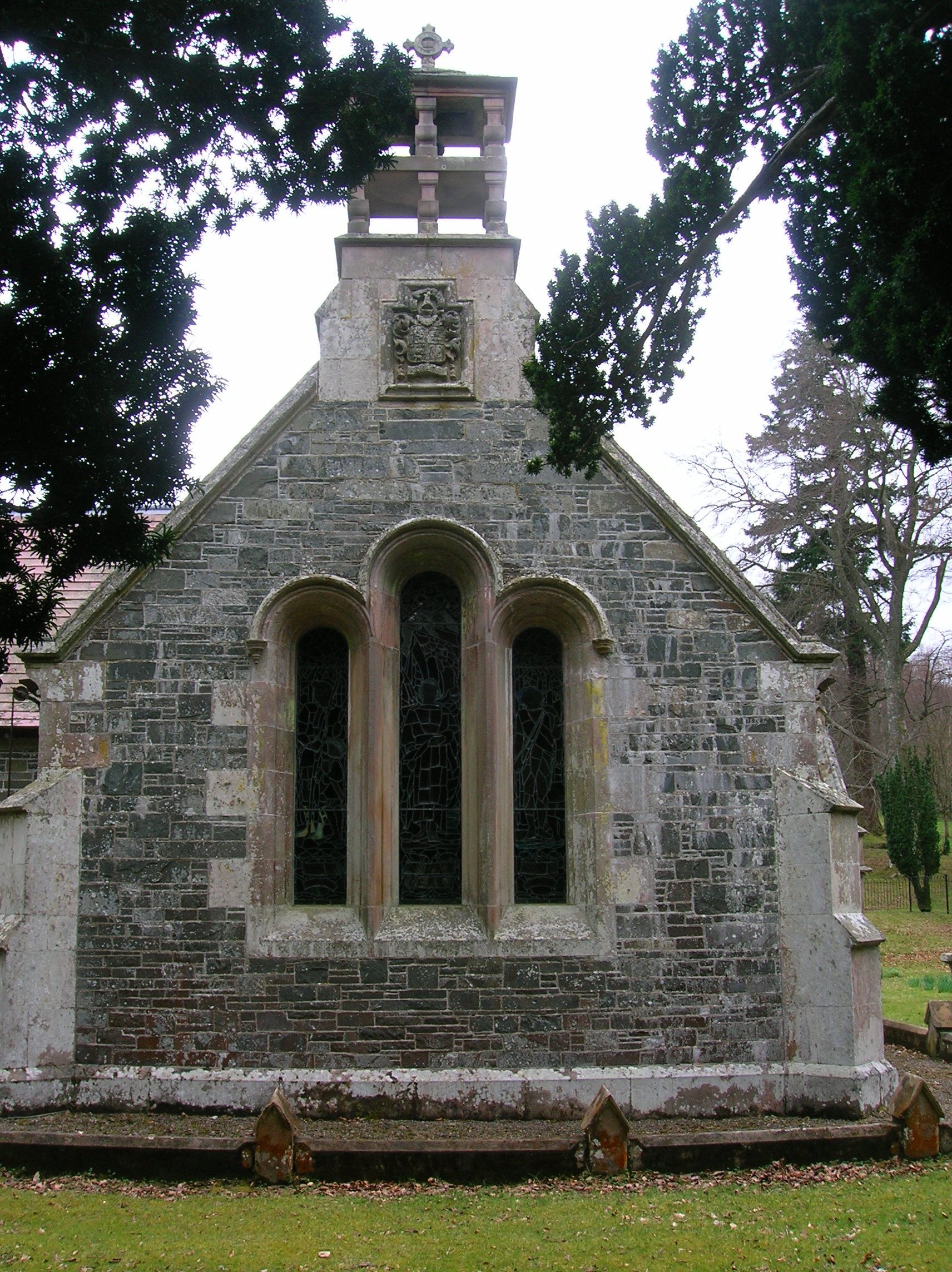
Stained glass windows and belfry.

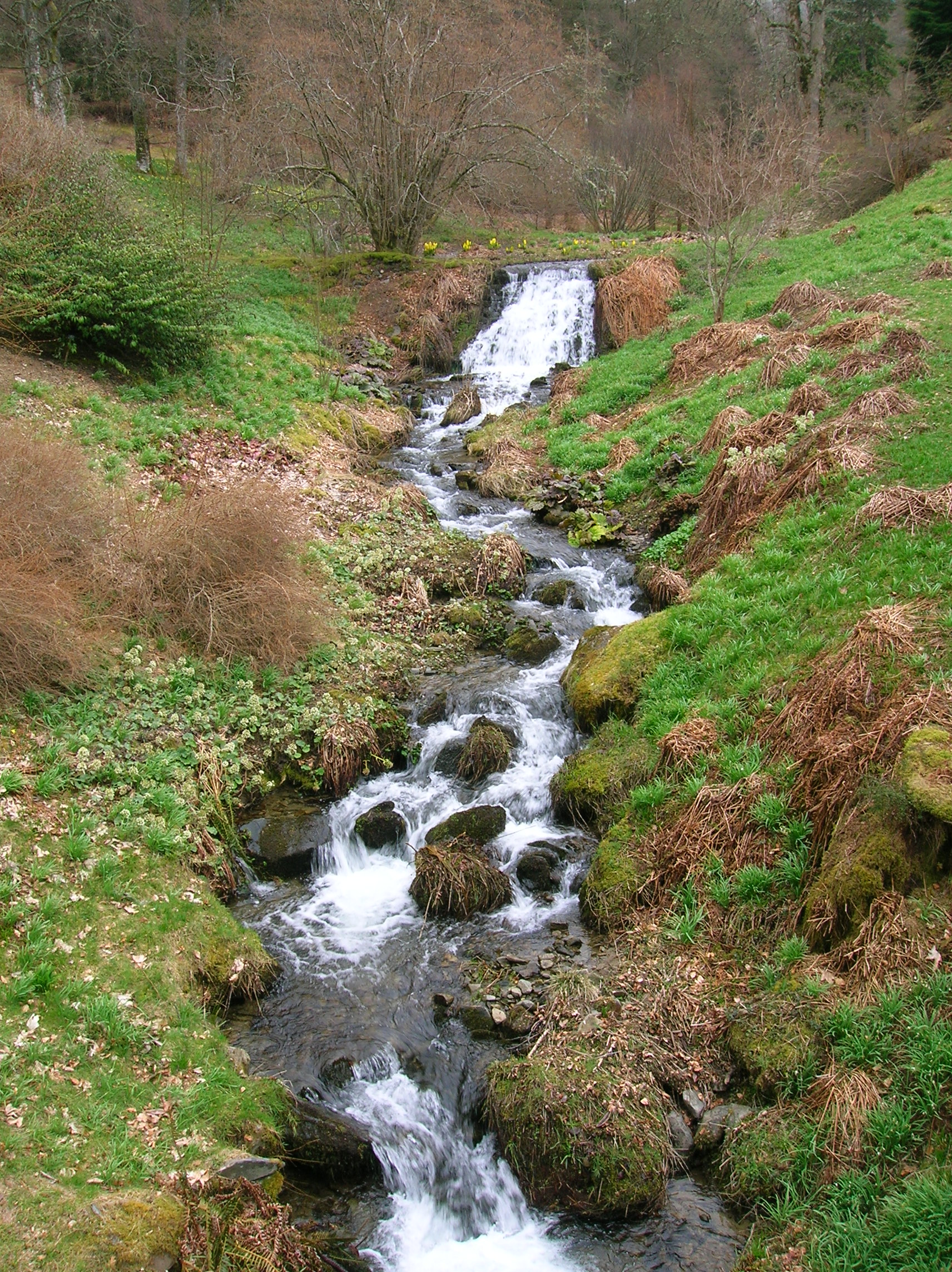
The Scrape Burn within the gardens.

== See also ==
- List of places in the Scottish Borders
- List of places in East Lothian
- List of places in Edinburgh
- Stobo Kirk

== References and sources ==
References;

1. Groome, Francis H. (1903). Ordnance Gazetteer of Scotland. V. 1. London: Caxton Publishing Company.
2. Johnston, J. B. (1903). Place-names of Scotland. Edinburgh: David Douglas.

Sources;
