= Sir James Nasmyth, 2nd Baronet =

Scottish botanist and politician

Sir James Nasmyth, 2nd Baronet (c. 1704 – 4 February 1779), also known as Naesmyth, of Dawyck and Posso, Peeblesshire, was a Scottish botanist and politician who sat in the House of Commons between 1732 and 1741.

== Early life ==
Nasmyth was the eldest son of Sir James Nasmyth, 1st Baronet, lawyer of Dawyck and Posso, and his wife Barbara Pringle, daughter of Andrew Pringle of Clifton, Roxburgh. He succeeded to the baronetcy when his father died in 1720. He married Jean Keith, daughter of Thomas Keith.

== Career ==
At the 1727 general election, Nasmyth contested Peeblesshire, a seat with about 20 voters which was controlled by the Earls of March. He lodged a petition after he was defeated by the sitting Member of Parliament (MP) John Douglas, claiming that the Sheriff of Peebles had been biased. The petition was rejected.

When Douglas died in 1731, Nasmyth contested the seat again at the resulting by-election on 28 April 1732, against the former MP Sir Alexander Murray, Bt. By this time William Douglas, 2nd Earl of March had died, and the 3rd Earl was only 6 years old. Nasmyth won the seat with the support of the Deputy Sheriff, and Murray's petition was rejected.

Two separate election meetings were held at the 1734 general election, so the deputy sheriff made a double return of both Nasmyth and Murray. Murray withdrew his petition, and on 7 February 1735 Nasmyth was declared to have been elected. He voted consistently with the government, and retired from the House of Commons at the 1741 general election.

Nasmyth planted 809 hectares of mixed woodlands on the Dawyck estate. He discovered the upright beech (Fagus sylvatica 'Dawyck') and funded several plant-collecting expeditions to Asia and North America.

== Later life and legacy ==
For his botanical work, Nasmyth was made a Fellow of the Royal Society in 1767.

Nasmyth died on 4 February 1779 leaving two sons. He was succeeded in the baronetcy by his son James.

Parliament of Great Britain
Preceded by John Douglas	Member of Parliament for Peeblesshire; 1732–1734	Vacant double return
Vacant double return	Member of Parliament for Peeblesshire; 1735–1741	Succeeded by Alexander Murray
Baronetage of Nova Scotia
Preceded by James Naesmyth	Baronet (of Posso); 1720–1779	Succeeded by James Naesmyth
