= Michael Strachan (businessman) =

Scottish businessman

Michael Francis Strachan CBE FRSE (23 October 1919 – 30 November 2000) was a 20th-century Scottish businessman who served as Director of the Bank of Scotland from 1972 to 1990. He also served with distinction in the Second World War, alongside his wartime comrade, Enoch Powell. As an author he was biographer of several obscure historical figures.

== Life ==
He was born on 23 October 1919 the son of Francis William Strachan and his wife, Violet Blackwell Palmer. His father was a British Army officer of Scots descent and his mother was a wealthy widow from the Crosse & Blackwell fortune. He was raised on a country estate in Herefordshire.

He was educated privately at Rugby School. He spent some time at Berlin University in 1938, witnessing the demonstrations surrounding the invasion of Sudetenland. He then won a place at Corpus Christi College, Cambridge.

His university career was interrupted by the Second World War and in 1940 he joined the Lothian and Border Horse Regiment (he was an able horseman). He was employed to interrogate captured German pilots due to his knowledge of German. He then joined Military Intelligence. A few weeks later he met Enoch Powell for the first time. Powell asked for Strachan as his second-in-command and they spent most of the war together. This included Operation Claymore, a commando raid on the Lofoten Islands in 1941, plus a long-time posting to GHQ Middle East, based in Cairo. In July 1943 they made a journey by truck together, from Cairo to Tangiers. He was then promoted to Brigade Major of the 26th Armoured Brigade and saw fierce action with them in Italy including the Battle of the Argenta Gap (April 1945). He ended the war at the rank of Lieutenant Colonel and spent 1945/6 as a staff officer in Milan. He won a Military MBE in 1945 and was also Mentioned in Dispatches.

He returned to Cambridge after the war in 1947 but changed course from Modern Languages to Economics. He graduated MA in 1949 and obtained a post with William Thomson & Co in Leith who were the operators of the Edinburgh branch of the Ben Line Shipping Company. In 1970 he became Chairman of Ben Line Steamers Ltd and Ben Line Containers Ltd, creating the Ben Line Ship Management Ltd in 1973. From 1972 (whilst still operating the Ben Line) he became a non-executive Director of the Bank of Scotland.

In 1979 he was elected a Fellow of the Royal Society of Edinburgh. His proposers were John Cameron, Lord Cameron, Anthony Elliot Ritchie, Robert Allan Smith and Sir John Atwell.

He was a Trustee of the National Library of Scotland and of the Carnegie Trust for Scottish University. He was also a member of the Royal Company of Archers. In 1980 his MBE was upgraded by Queen Elizabeth II to a Commander of the Order of the British Empire (CBE). He was also a member of the Hakluyt Society.

He retired from the Ben Line in 1982 but continued as a Director of the Bank of Scotland until 1990.

He died on 30 November 2000.

== Family ==
In 1948 he married Iris Hemingway. They had two sons and two daughters.

From 1970 they lived in "Glenhighton" in the village of Broughton in the Scottish Borders. He also had a large Edinburgh house at 9 Newbattle Terrace in the Morningside district.

== Publications ==
- The Life and Adventures of Thomas Coryate (1962)
- The East India Company Journals of Captain William Keeling and Master Thomas Bonner, 1615 to 1617 (1971)
- Teaching the Professor (1987) - his exploits with Enoch Powell
- Sir Thomas Roe 1581-1644: A Life (1989)
- The Ben Line 1825-1992 (1992)
- Esmond de Beer (1895-1990): Scholar and Benefactor (1995)
