= Sir James Nasmyth, 1st Baronet =

Scottish lawyer

Sir James Nasmyth, 1st Baronet (1656 - 1720), also known as James Naesmith, was a successful Scottish lawyer.

== Life ==
He was the son of John Nasmyth and his wife, Isabella, daughter of Sir James Murray, Lord Philiphaugh. He was admitted advocate in 1684. He acquired the estate of Dawick from the last of the Veitch family. He had a crown charter of the barony of Dawick in 1703, ratified in parliament in 1705, and was created a baronet of Scotland on 31 July 1706. He undertook a new phase of planting on the Dawyck estate, including the introduction of European larch (Larix decidua).

He died in July 1720.

== Family ==
Nasmyth married three times:

1. To Jane Stewart, widow of Sir Ludovic Gordon, bart., of Gordonstoun, Elgin;
2. To Janet, daughter of Sir William Murray of Stanhope, Peeblesshire; and,
3. To Barbara (d. 1768), daughter of Andrew Pringle of Clifton, Roxburghshire.

Sir James Nasmyth, 2nd Baronet was the eldest son by the third marriage.

== Notes ==
Attribution

This article incorporates text from a publication now in the public domain: Lee, Sidney, ed. (1894). "Nasmyth, James (d.1720)". Dictionary of National Biography. Vol. 40. London: Smith, Elder & Co.

Baronetage of Nova Scotia
New creation	Baronet (of Posso); 1706–1720	Succeeded by James Naesmyth
