= Dawyck Botanic Garden =

Botanic garden and arboretum in Scotland

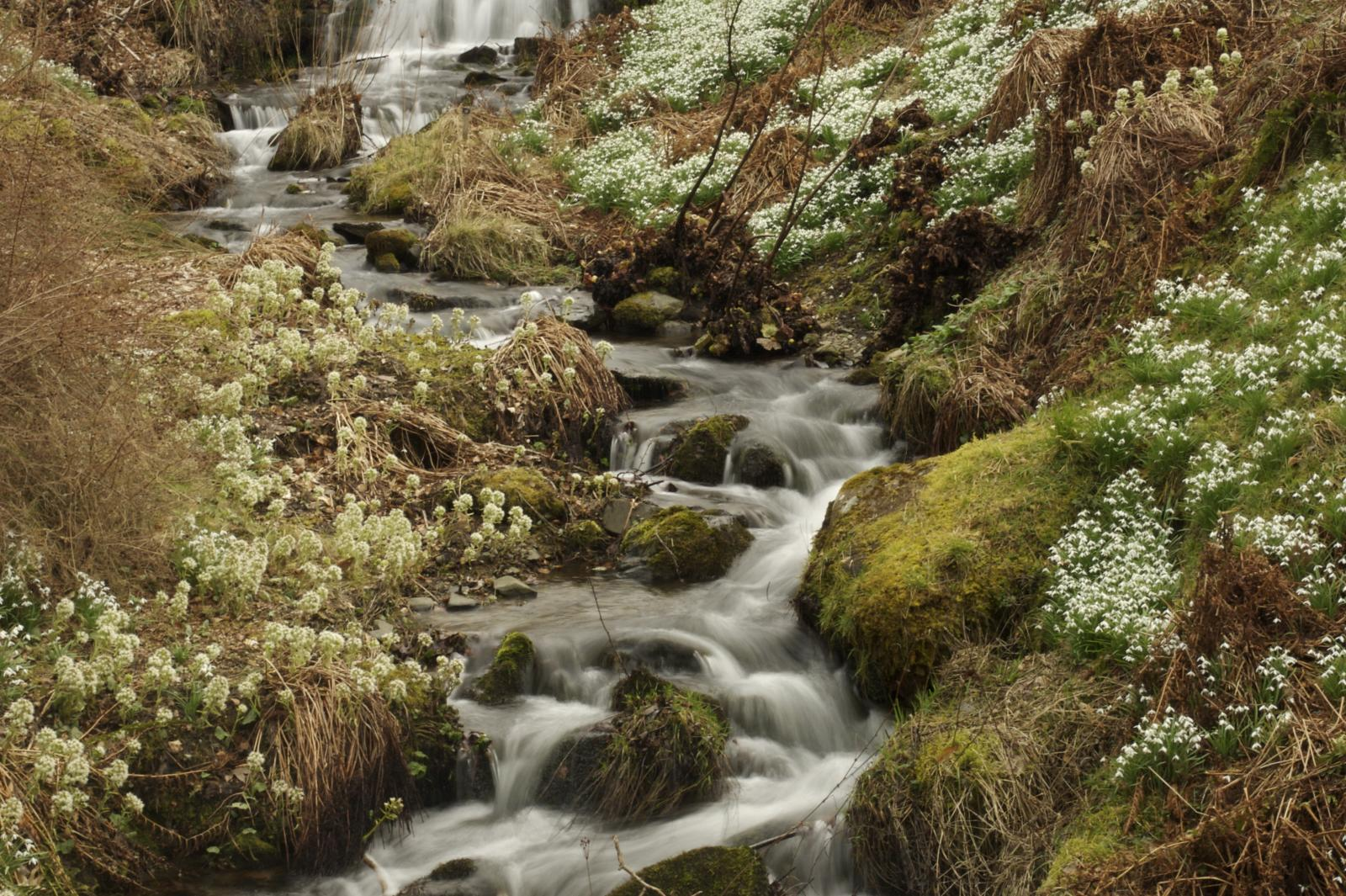
- Scrape Burn within the gardens

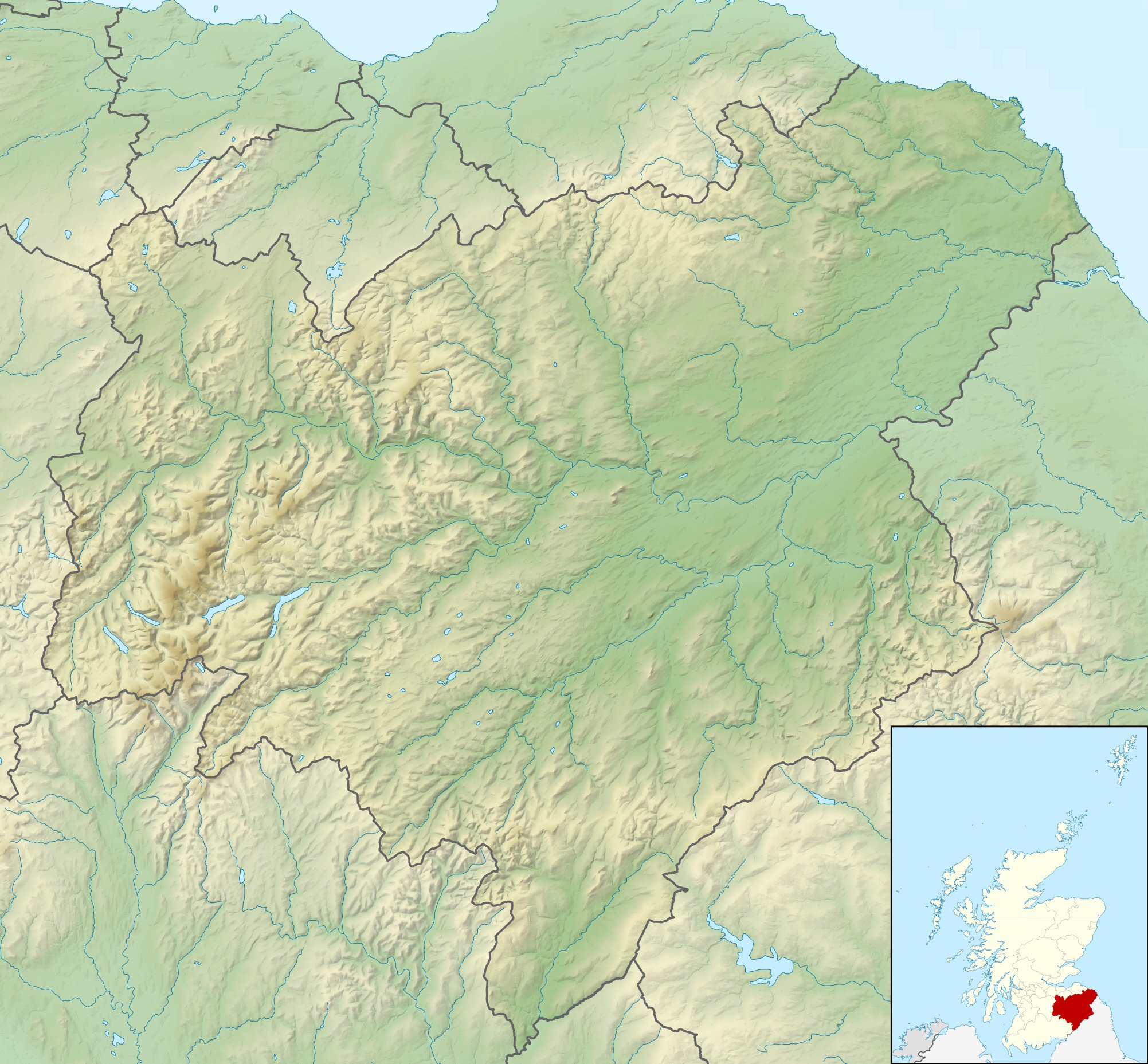
- Location within Scottish Borders
- Interactive map of Dawyck Botanic Garden
- Location: Stobo
- Nearest city: Peebles
- Coordinates: 55°36′11″N 3°19′23″W
- Area: 25 ha (62 acres)
- Created: 17th Century
- Operator: Royal Botanic Garden Edinburgh
- Visitors: 33,507
- Status: Open
Designations
Inventory of Gardens and Designed Landscapes in Scotland
- Official name: Dawyck
- Designated: 1 July 1987
- Reference no.: GDL00134

Dawyck Botanic Garden is a botanic garden and arboretum covering 25 hectares (62 acres) at Stobo on the B712, 8 miles (13 kilometres) south-west of Peebles in the Scottish Borders region of Scotland, OS ref. NT168352. The garden is situated in the Upper Tweed Valley, a National Scenic Area and is open 1 February - 30 November.

Dawyck, with Logan Botanic Garden (near Stranraer) and Benmore Botanic Garden (near Dunoon), is an outpost or Regional Garden of the Royal Botanic Garden Edinburgh (RBGE).

== History ==
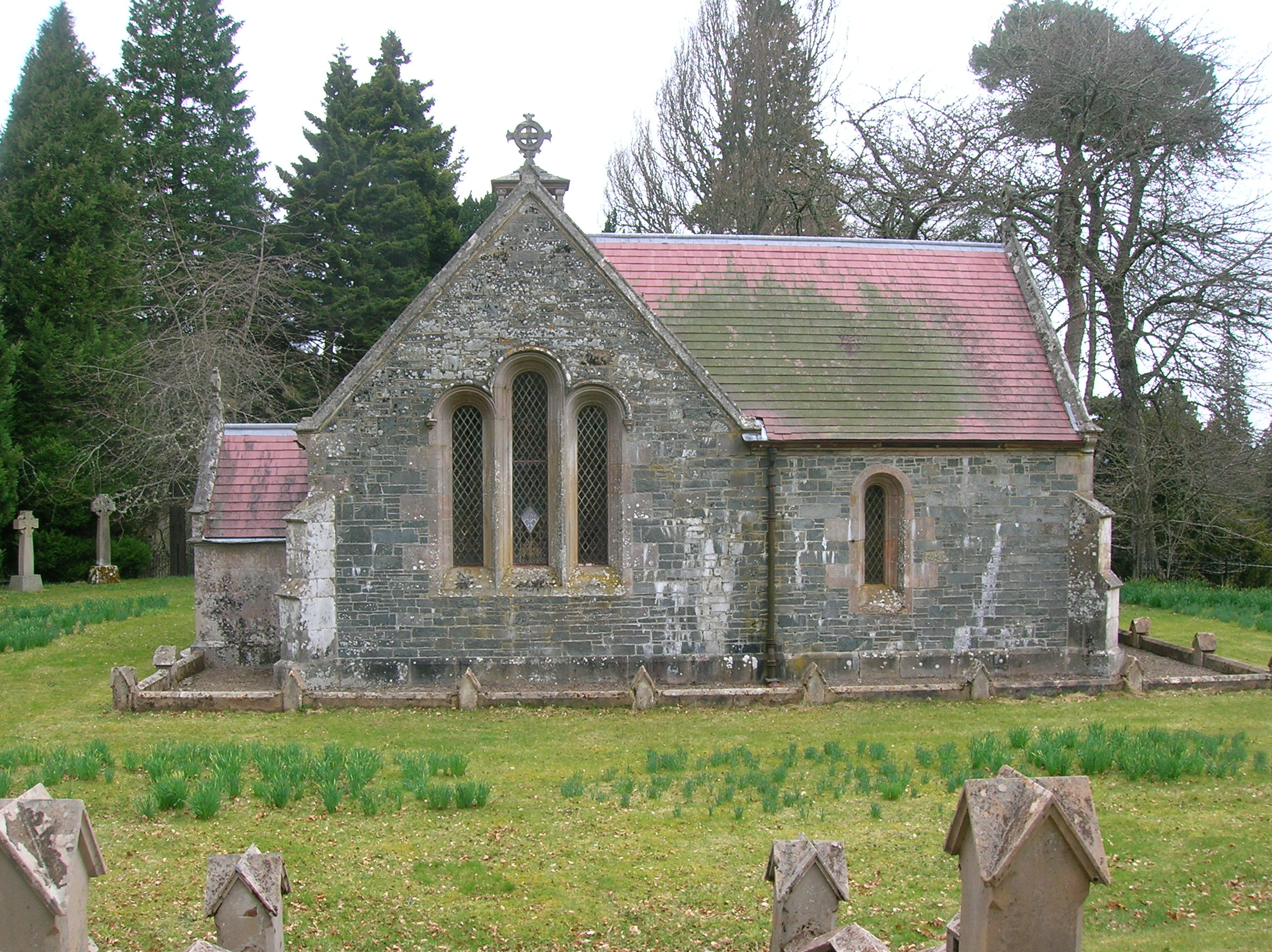
Dawyck Chapel sits on an ancient religious site within the gardens.

The name is also given as 'Dawic', and 'Dauwic' in circa 1200. It may derive from the Gaelic for an ox and the Old English 'wic' for a camp or dwelling.

The Veitch family planted the garden at Dawyck House in the 17th century until the Naesmith family took over in 1691. Sir John Murray Naesmith supported plant-hunting expeditions, especially those undertaken by the explorer and plant hunter David Douglas (1799–1834). In 1897 the Balfour family acquired the Dawyck Estate, and in 1978 they gave the Garden to the Royal Botanic Garden, with the exception of Dawyck House and chapel which remain in private use.

The private Dawyck Chapel, built in 1837, sits on the site of the ancient Dalwick Chapel within the gardens.

== Views within the Botanic Gardens ==
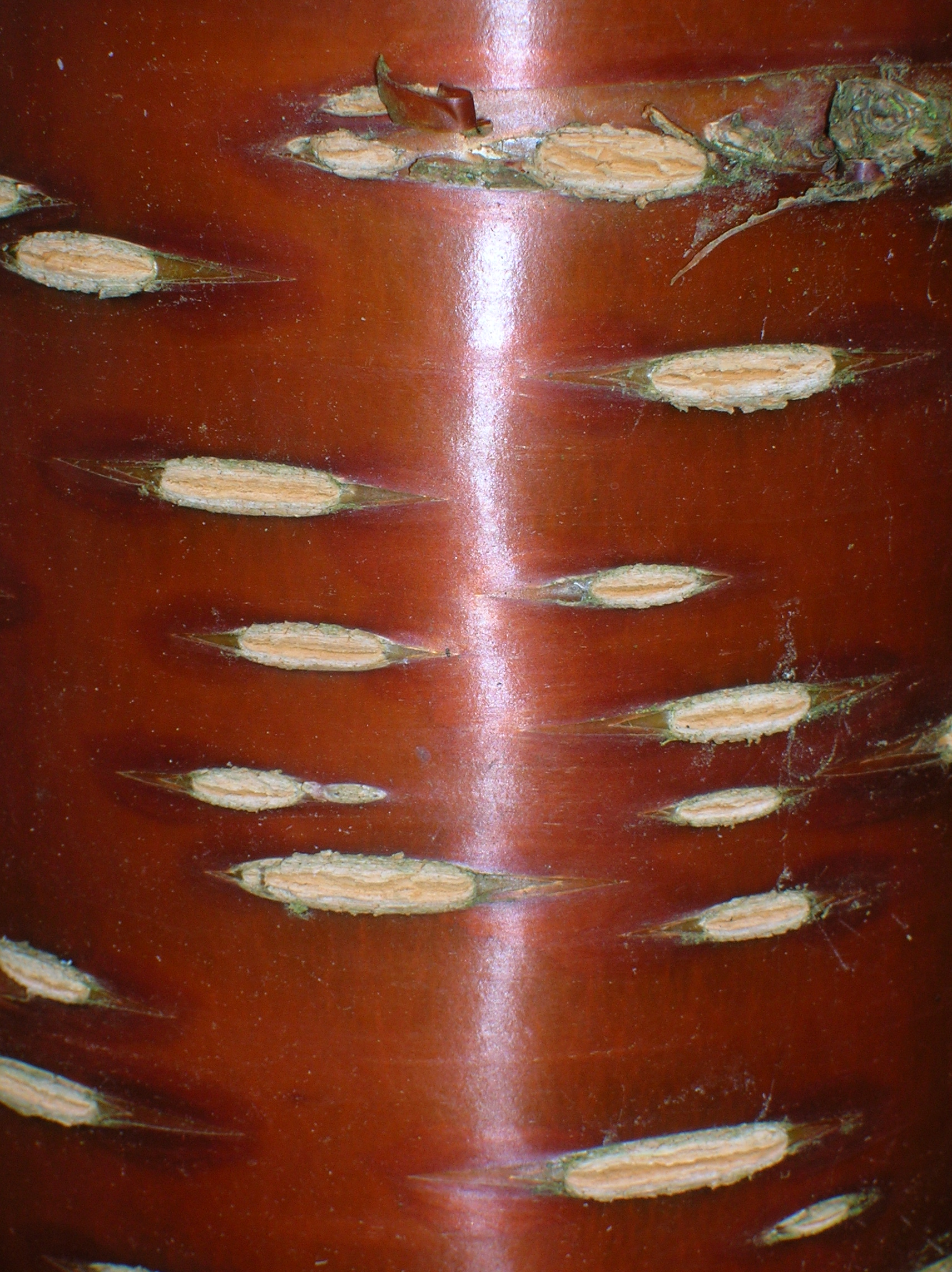
Bark of a Tibetan cherry tree in the gardens

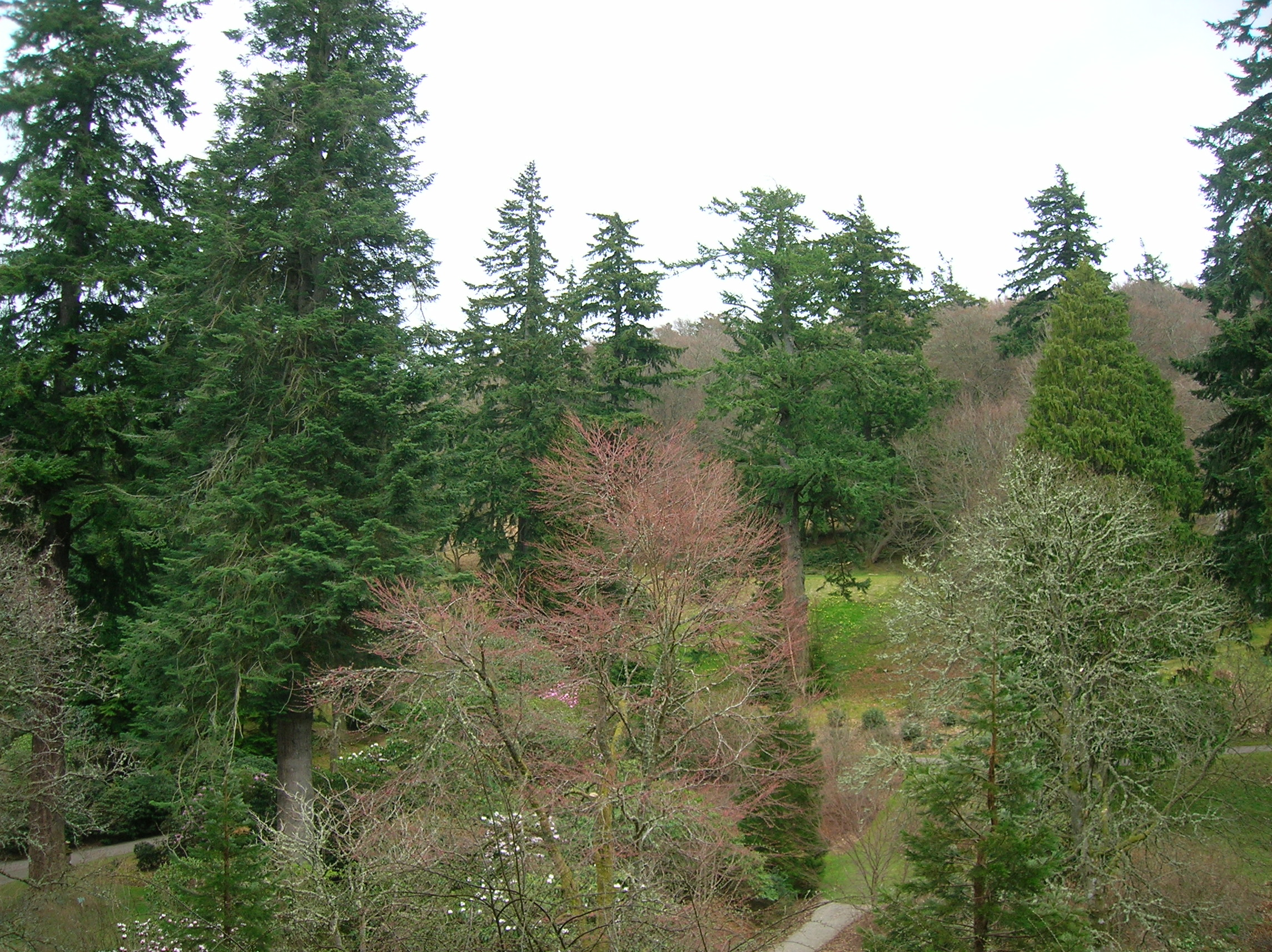
Douglas Firs and other mature conifers

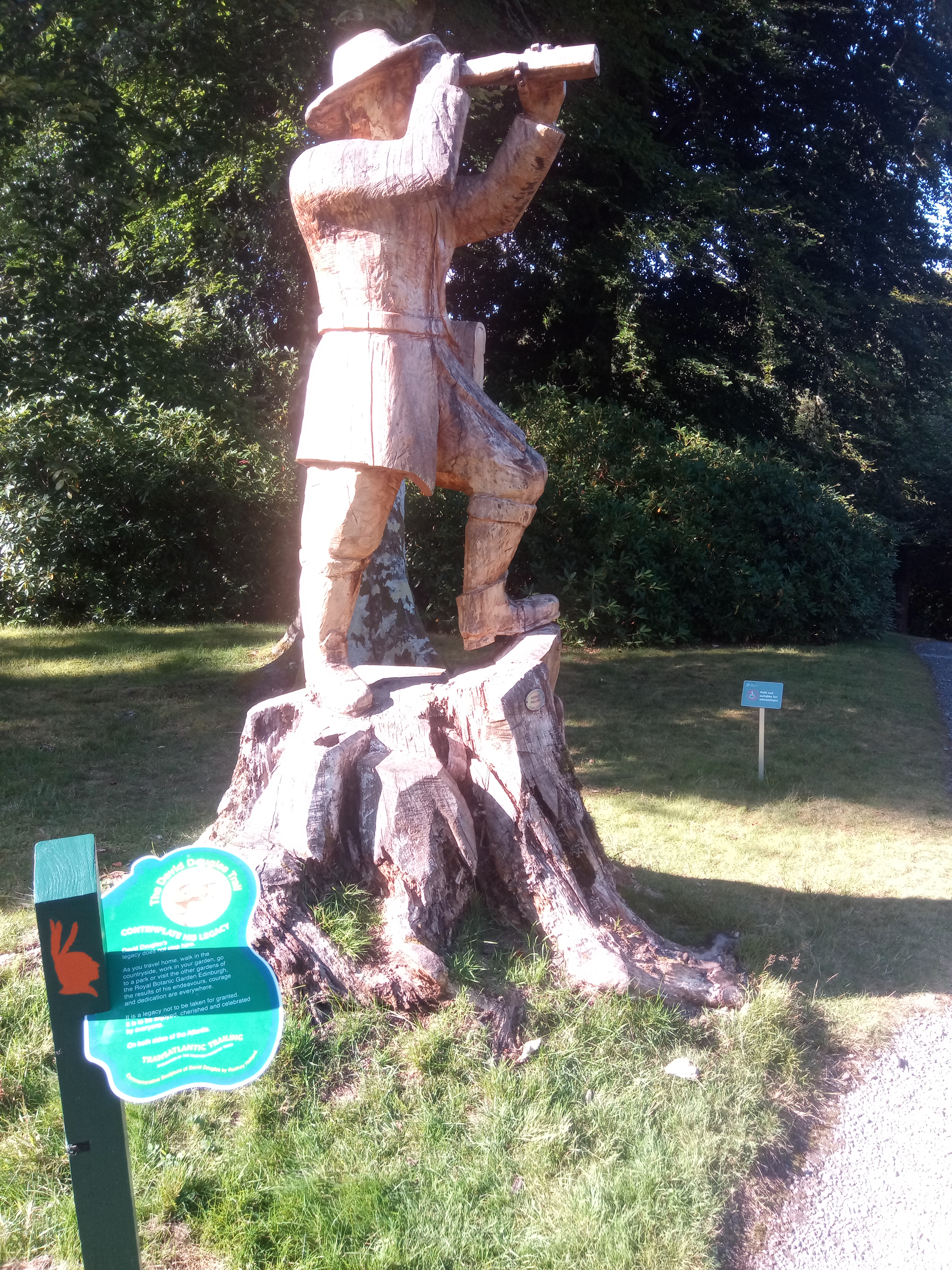
Wood sculpture of David Douglas

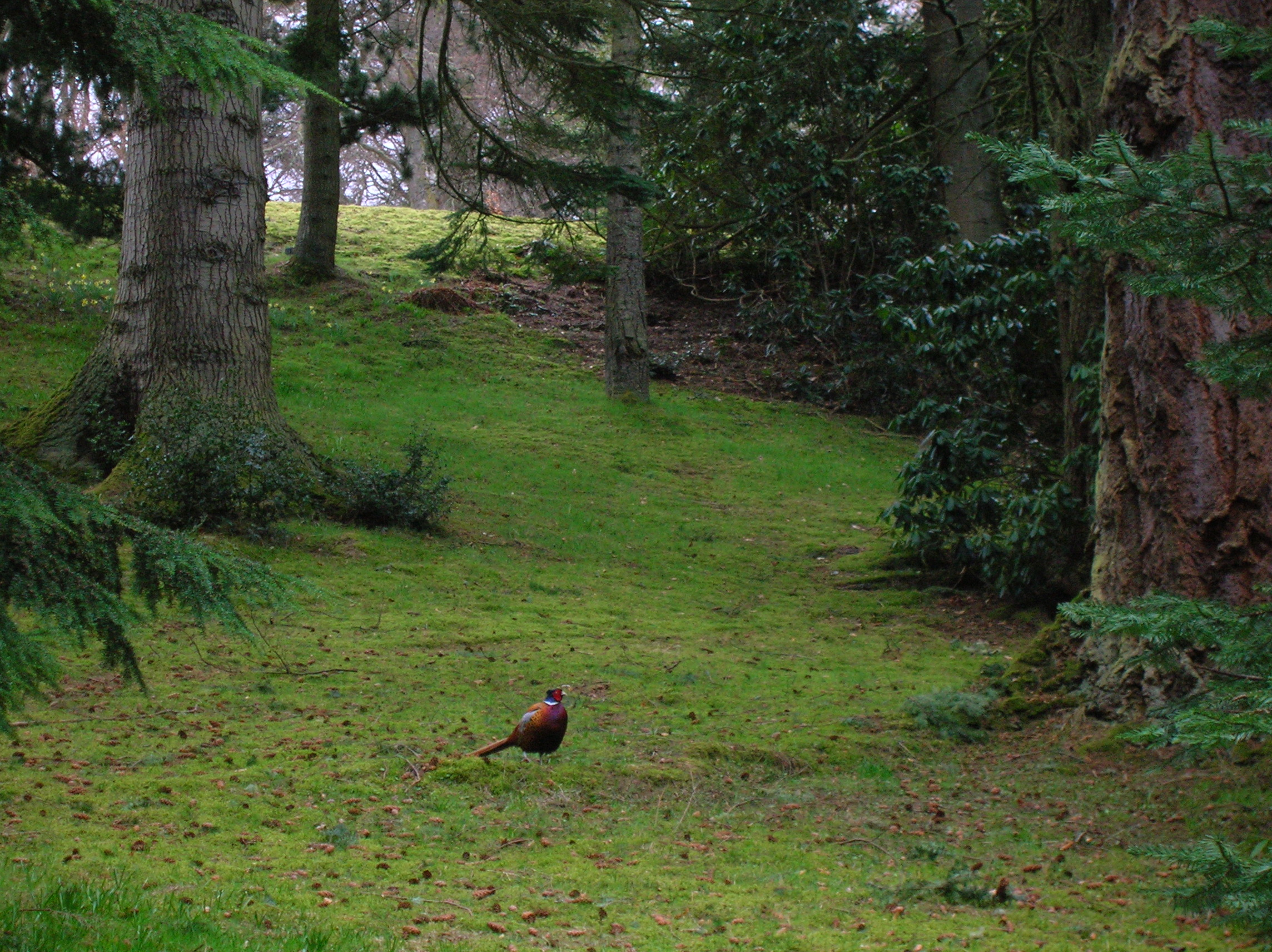
One of the many pheasants within the grounds

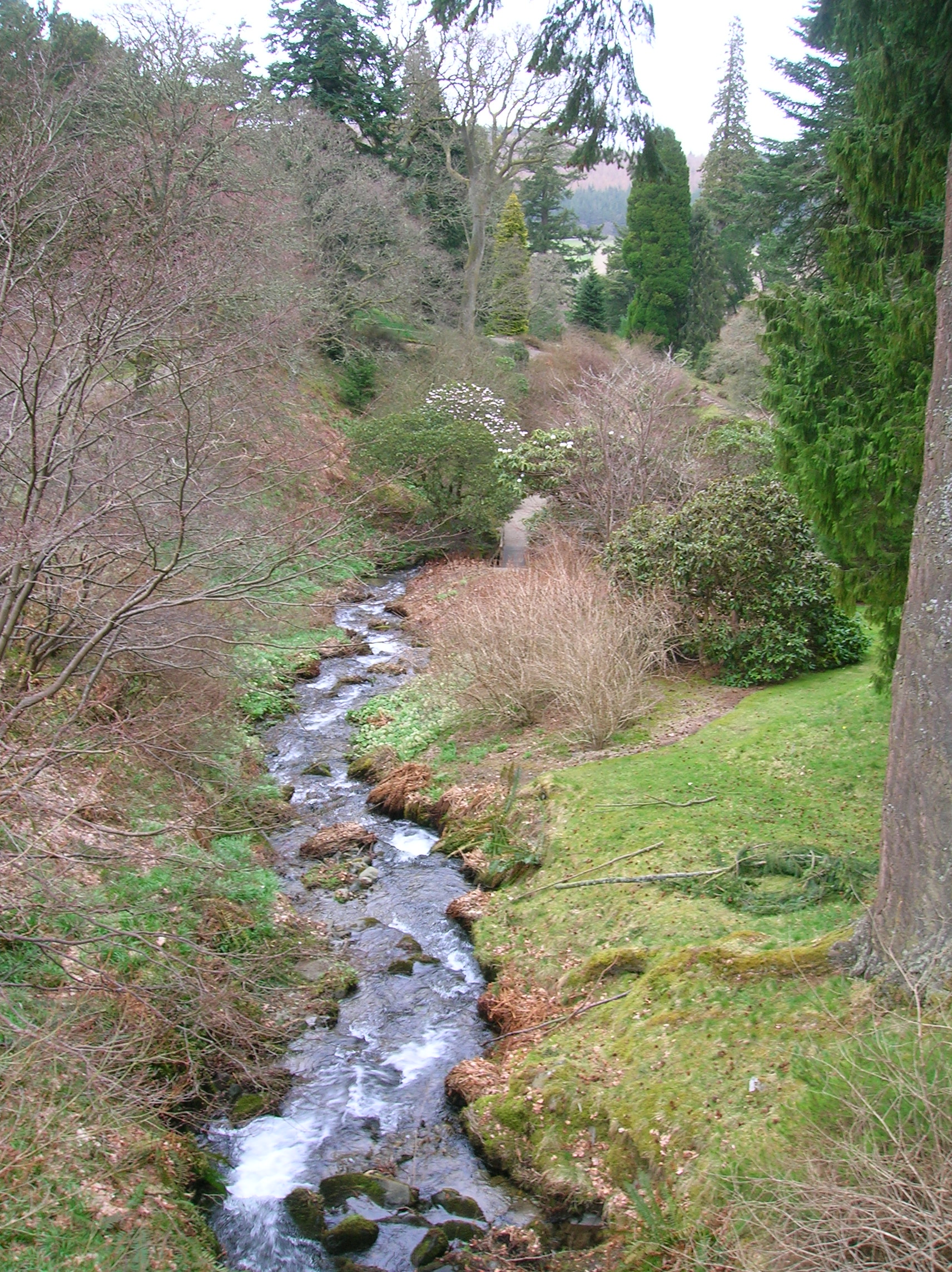
A view from the Dutch Bridge

== Heritage Trees of Scotland ==
Of the eleven "Heritage Trees of Scotland" in the Scottish Borders, three are at Dawyck. The Dawyck Silver Fir is 35 m (115 ft) in height, the trunk measures 172 cm (5 ft 7 in), and its girth is 5.4 m (17 ft 9 in). There are also the Dawyck Larch, planted 1725, girth 4.46 m height 33 m; and the Dawyck Beech, planted 1860, has an unusual form with upswept branches.

== See also ==
- Dawyck Chapel
- List of places in the Scottish Borders
- Royal Botanic Garden Edinburgh
- The Dawyck Gateway Visitor Centre was nominated for the RIAS Andrew Doolan Award for Architecture in 2008.
