= List of listed buildings in Stobo, Scottish Borders =

This is a list of listed buildings in the parish of Stobo in the Scottish Borders, Scotland.

== List ==
Name	Location	Date Listed	Grid Ref. (Note: Sometimes known as OSGB36, the grid reference (where provided) is based on the British national grid reference system used by the Ordnance Survey. • "Guide to National Grid". Ordnance Survey. • "Get-a-map". Ordnance Survey.)	Geo-coordinates	Notes	LB Number (Note: Historic Environment Scotland assign a unique alphanumeric identifier to each designated site in Scotland, for listed buildings this always begins with "LB", for example "LB12345".)	Image
Wester Happrew				55°39′46″N 3°19′08″W	Category C(S)	19744	Upload Photo
Stobo Parish Church				55°37′32″N 3°17′58″W	Category B	15356	Upload Photo
Dawyck Mill Farm, The Old Mill				55°36′44″N 3°18′28″W	Category C(S)	15376	Upload Photo
Glebe House (Former Manse)				55°37′31″N 3°17′56″W	Category B	15378	Upload Photo
Stobo Mill				55°37′11″N 3°18′38″W	Category B	15380	Upload Photo
Stobo Newhouses				55°36′44″N 3°18′57″W	Category B	15372	Upload Photo
Brownsland				55°39′30″N 3°19′20″W	Category C(S)	15375	Upload Photo
Stobo Joiner's Shop				55°36′45″N 3°18′54″W	Category B	13897	Upload Photo
Churchyard				55°37′31″N 3°17′57″W	Category B	15377	Upload Photo
Stobo Castle				55°36′59″N 3°18′53″W	Category A	15379	Upload Photo
Smithy, Stobo				55°36′44″N 3°18′54″W	Category B	15373	Upload Photo
East Lodge Cottages				55°37′25″N 3°18′00″W	Category B	15381	Upload Photo
Stobo Manse Stables				55°37′33″N 3°17′56″W	Category C(S)	19745	Upload Photo
Garden Lodge				55°37′05″N 3°18′25″W	Category B	15382	Upload Photo
Stobo Garden Bridge Over Weston Burn				55°37′09″N 3°18′36″W	Category C(S)	15383	Upload Photo
Lyne Viaduct				55°38′50″N 3°15′28″W	Category B	19665	Upload Photo
Dreva Craigend Bridge Over Biggar Water				55°35′56″N 3°23′10″W	Category B	15374	Upload Photo

== Key ==
The scheme for classifying buildings in Scotland is:

- Category A: "buildings of national or international importance, either architectural or historic; or fine, little-altered examples of some particular period, style or building type."
- Category B: "buildings of regional or more than local importance; or major examples of some particular period, style or building type, which may have been altered."
- Category C: "buildings of local importance; lesser examples of any period, style, or building type, as originally constructed or moderately altered; and simple traditional buildings which group well with other listed buildings."

In March 2016 there were 47,288 listed buildings in Scotland. Of these, 8% were Category A, and 50% were Category B, with the remaining 42% being Category C.
