= Naesmyth baronets =

Extinct baronetcy in the Baronetage of Nova Scotia

The Naesmyth Baronetcy, of Posso in the County of Peebles, was a title in the Baronetage of Nova Scotia.

It was created on 31 July 1706 for James Naesmyth. The second Baronet sat as Member of Parliament for Peeblesshire and was an amateur botanist and Fellow of the Royal Society. The title became extinct on the death of the eighth Baronet in 1928.

The name "Naesmyth of Posso" was taken as a surname by an Anglican clergyman, George Cresswell Naesmyth Webb (1895-fl.1977), who served as Sequestrator of Southwick with Boarhunt in Hampshire between 1944 and 1975. His connection with the family of Naesmyth is unclear.

== Naesmyth baronets, of Posso (1706) ==
- Sir James Nasmyth, 1st Baronet (died 1720)
- Sir James Naesmyth, 2nd Baronet (c. 1704–1779)
- Sir James Naesmyth, 3rd Baronet (died 1829)
- Sir John Murray Naesmyth, 4th Baronet (1803–1876)
- Sir James Naesmyth, 5th Baronet (1827–1896)
- Sir Michael George Naesmyth, 6th Baronet (1828–1907)
- Sir James Tolme Naesmyth, 7th Baronet (1864–1922)
- Sir Douglas Arthur Bradley Naesmyth, 8th Baronet (1905–1928)
