= Stobo Kirk =

Ancient Scottish church

Coordinates: 55.625544°N 3.299381°W

Stobo Kirk is an ancient church of the Church of Scotland. It is dedicated to St Mungo and is situated near the B712 off the A72 just 6 miles south-west of Peebles in the ancient county of Peeblesshire, now part of the Scottish Borders Council area. It stands near the confluence of the River Tweed with the Easton Burn.

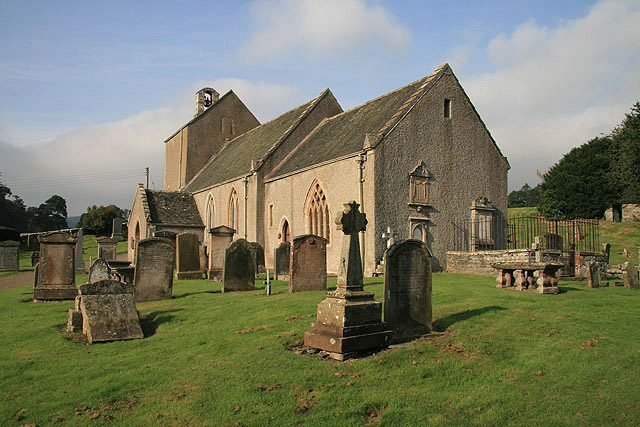
Stobo Kirk

== History ==
=== Early history ===
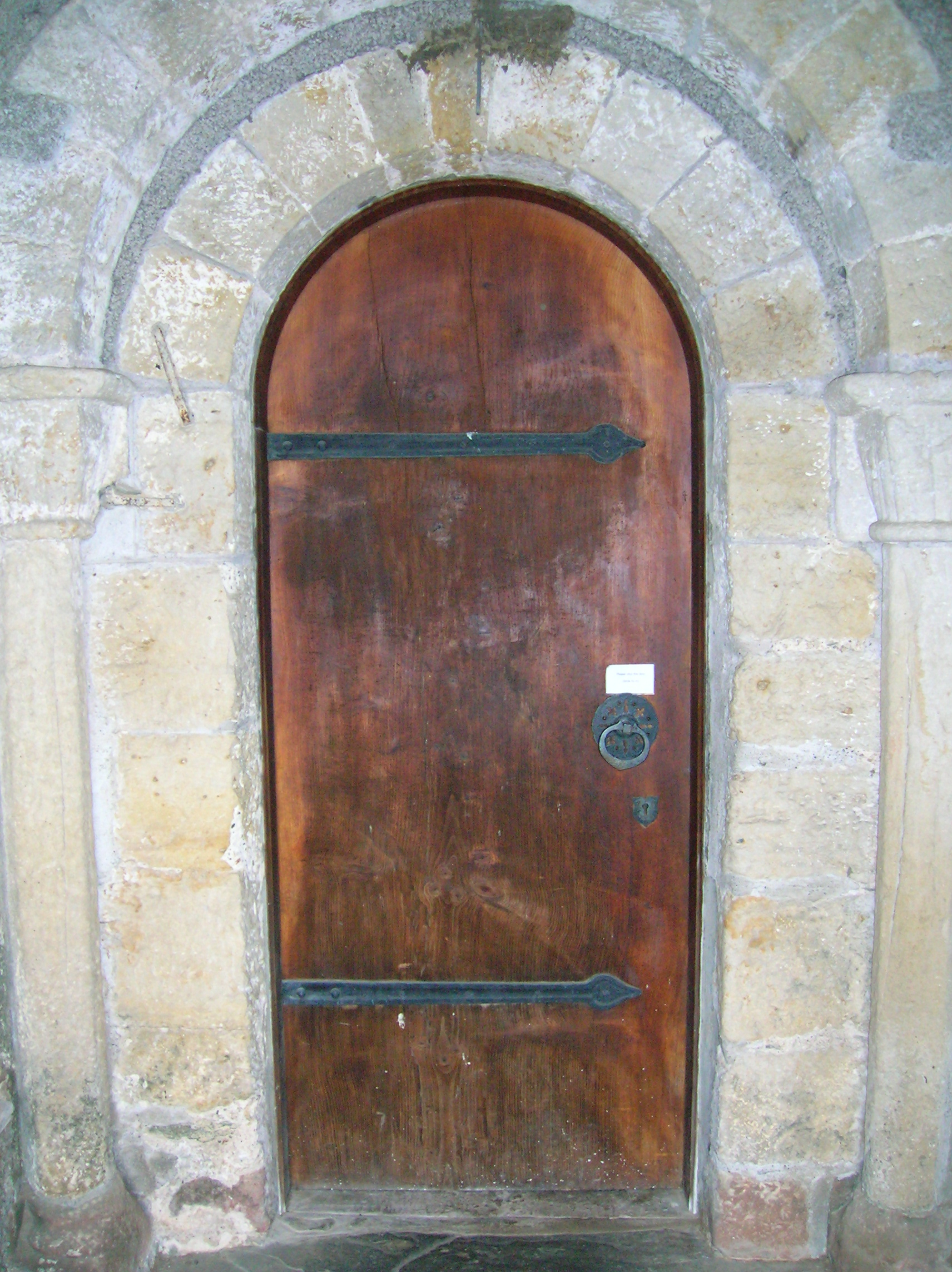
The Cedar of Lebanon entrance door.

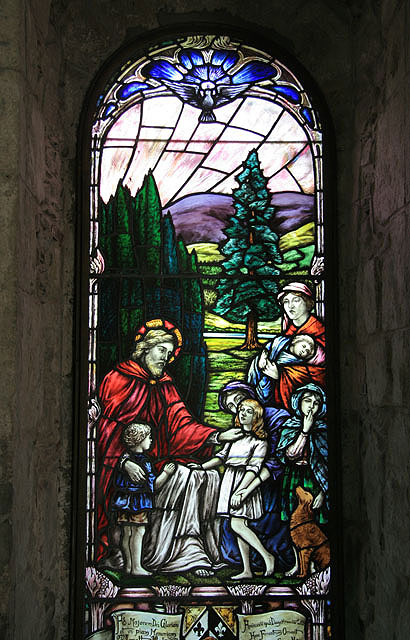
Jesus Christ blessing children, one of the stained glass windows in Stobo Kirk.

It is believed there has been a church on the site of present-day Stobo Kirk since as early as the 6th century. St Kentigern, otherwise known as St Mungo, founded many churches during his time as Archbishop of the ancient kingdom of Strathclyde, and Stobo is believed to be one of his foundations.

Stobo was originally the 'plebania' or mother church with subordinate chapelries or churches at Dawyck, Drumelzier, Kingledoors, Tweedsmuir, Broughton, Glenholm, and Lyne.

=== Medieval times ===
A new church, the ancestor of the present building, was built in the 12th century, but is unusually on a NE-SW axes rather than the conventional E-W axes.

During the 15th and 16th centuries, the Scottish people were becoming weary of the rule of Rome. The church was becoming wealthy but the people were still poor and many voices spoke of reforming the church in Scotland. The people of Stobo were no different and when their canon, Adam Colquhoun, was succeeded by one of his two sons, it helped fuel the desire for a reformed church.

=== Post-Reformation ===
Stobo, part of the Parish of Stobo in the Diocese of Glasgow until the Protestant Reformation, appears to have retained much of the original 12th-century building, including windows, the nave and chancel, unlike many other Roman Catholic churches which were destroyed after the coming of the reformed religion. The tower was raised above first-floor level in the 16th century, and further major restoration was carried out in 1863 by John Lessels, an eminent 19th-century architect. Further major restoration work was carried out in 1929. The church exterior is not so inviting but the interior is of great interest and character.

== Legend ==
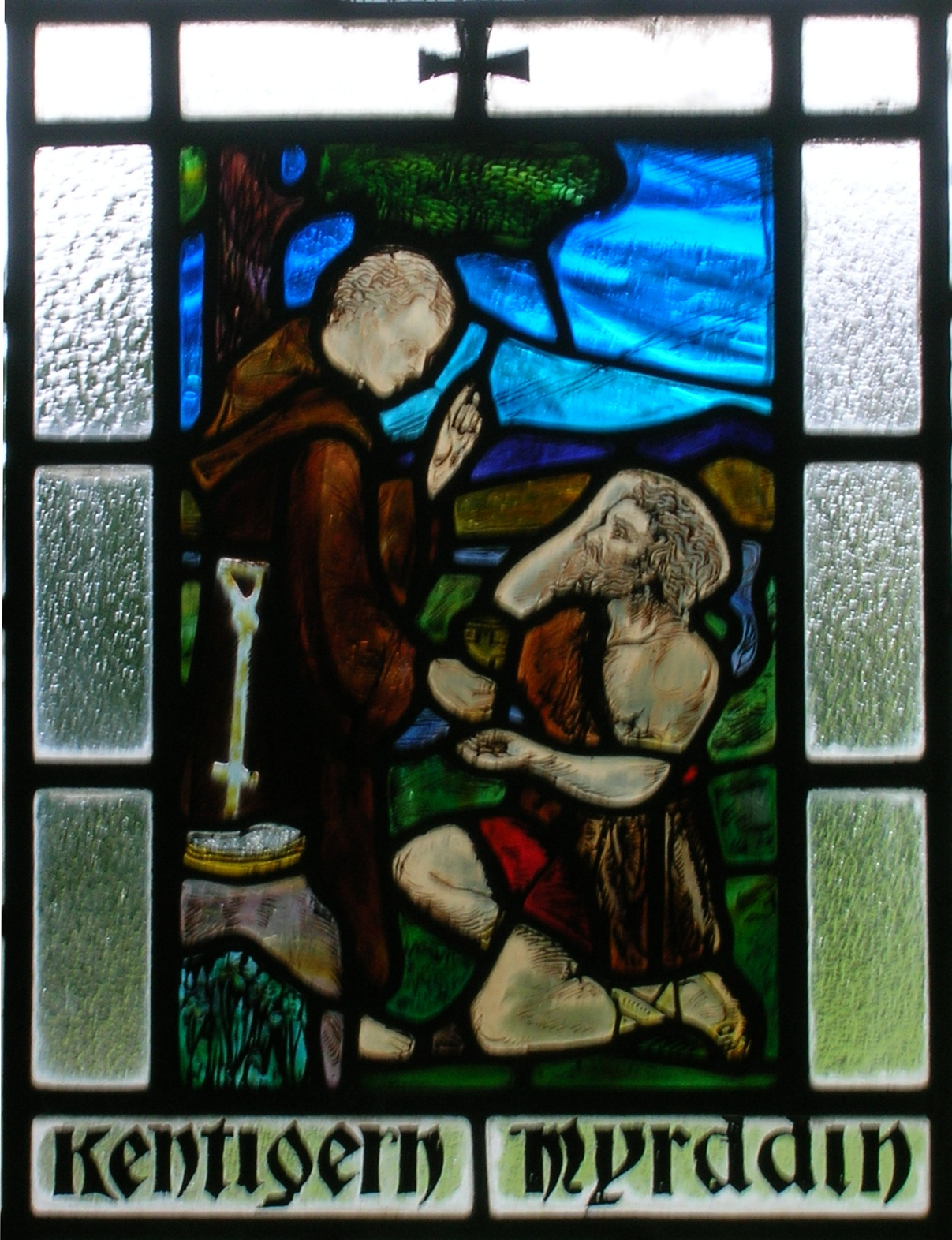
"Kentigern, Myrddin": Merlin Sylvestris (Merlin Wyllt) being converted to Christianity by Saint Kentigern

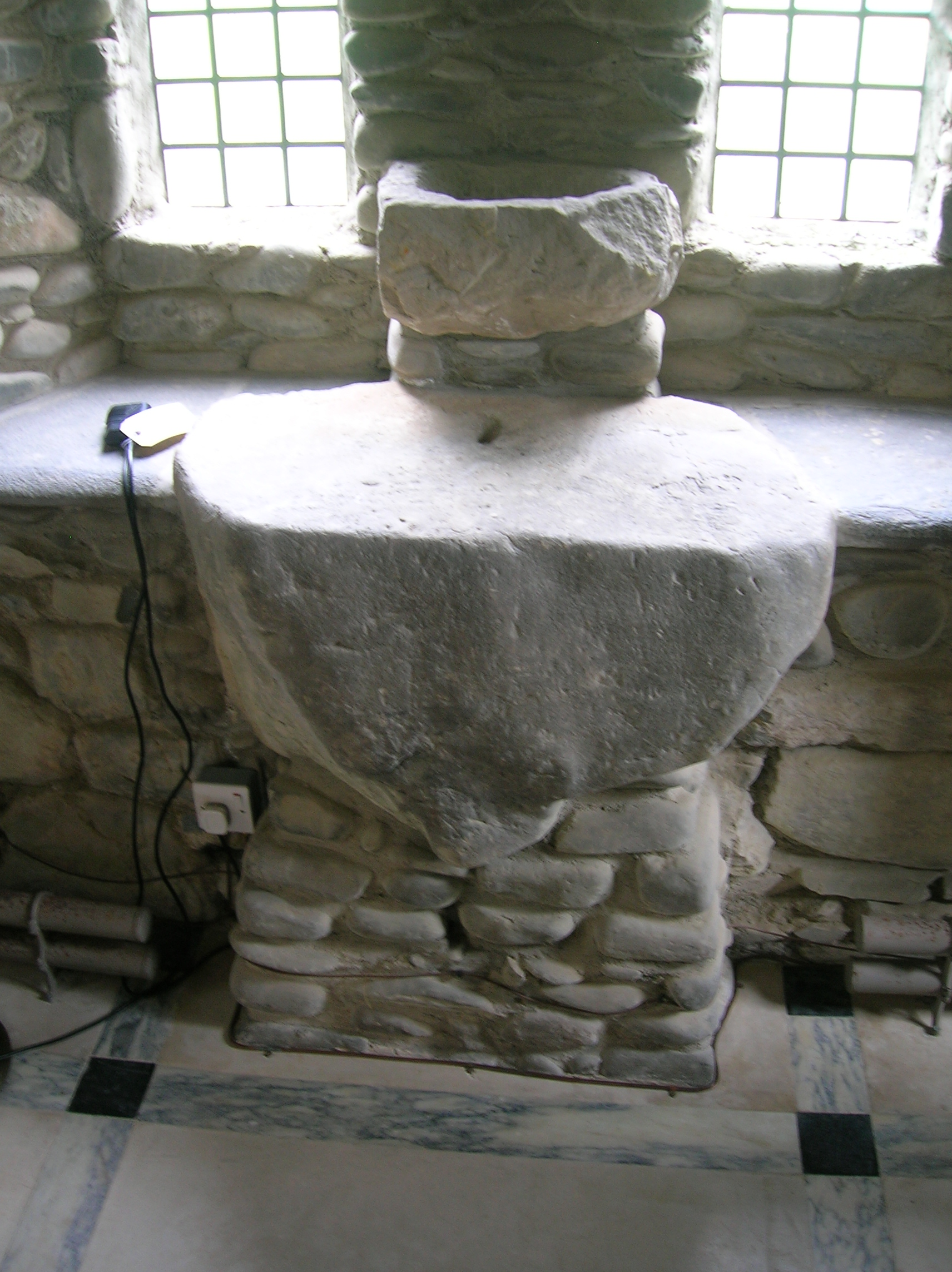
The 'altarstone' in Stobo Kirk on which Merlin was converted to Christianity

Legend has it that St Kentigern converted Myrddin Wyllt (Merlin Sylvestris) or Merlin (the wizard associated with King Arthur) to Christianity and baptised him on a boulder near Drumelzier. Merlin had fled to the forest after Gwenddoleu had been defeated and killed at the battle of Arderydd near Arthuret in 573. There is a great rock at the spot known as the 'Altar Stone' and a stained glass window in Stobo Kirk commemorates the event.

== Description of the Kirk building ==
Both the church and the graveyard are B listed.

=== Porch ===
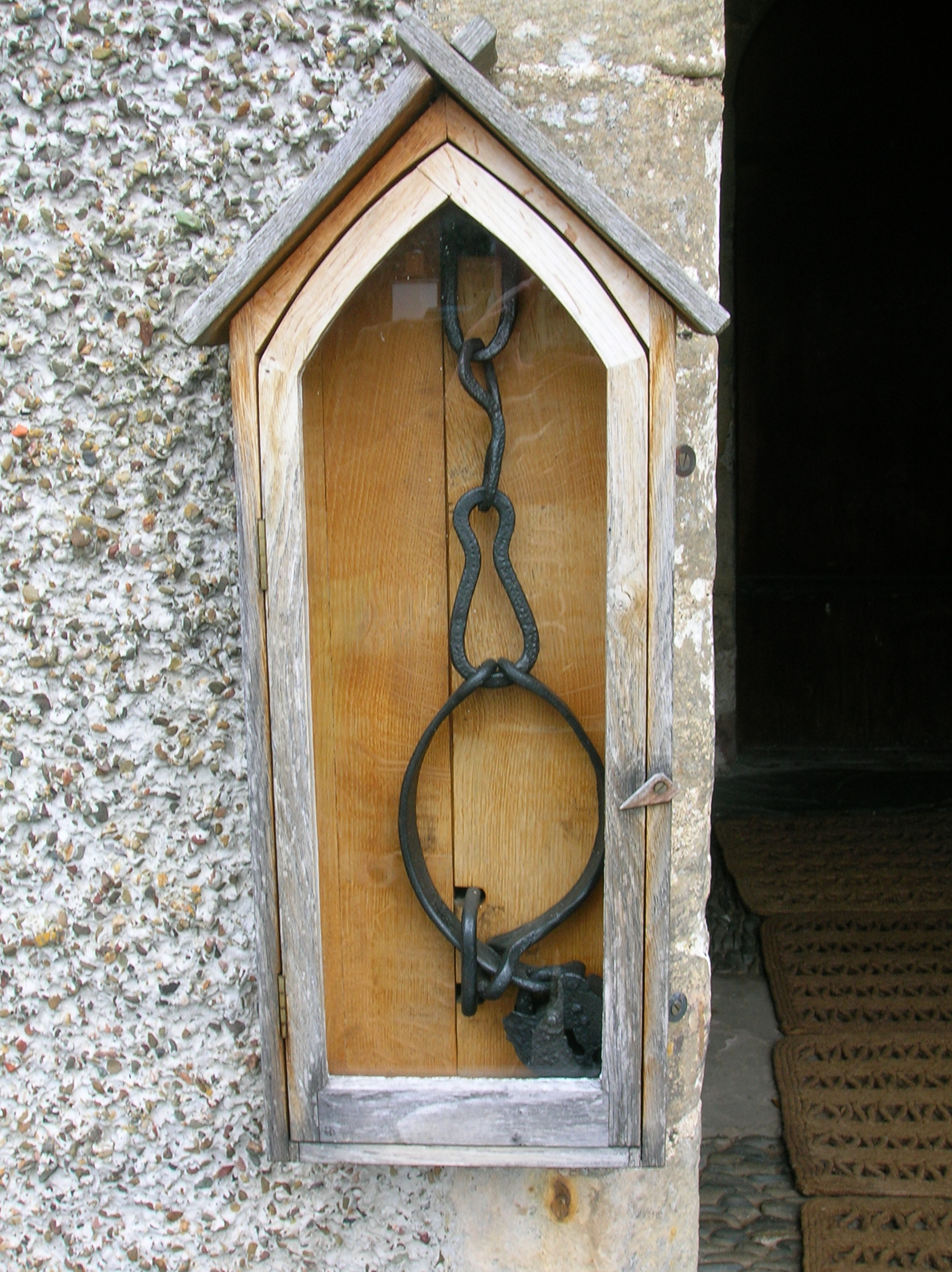
The Jougs on the porch wall

The porch was added in the late 15th–16th century and is notable for the grooves in the left-hand doorjamb, created by pupils sharpening their slate pencils before class and possibly by the sharpening of arrow heads prior to the weekly after-church archery practice which became compulsory after the disaster of the Battle of Flodden. The 12th-century Norman entrance into the nave has a door made from a single board of cedar wood from the nearby Dawyck estate.

On the outer entrance hangs the old Jougs used to punish recalcitrant members of the parish until some time in the 18th century.

=== Nave ===
A much damaged Celtic cross was found in the stonework during restoration and a reconstruction has been placed in the nave. The red paint on the stonework is a reminder of the original brightly painted character of pre-Reformation churches.

=== North aisle chapel ===
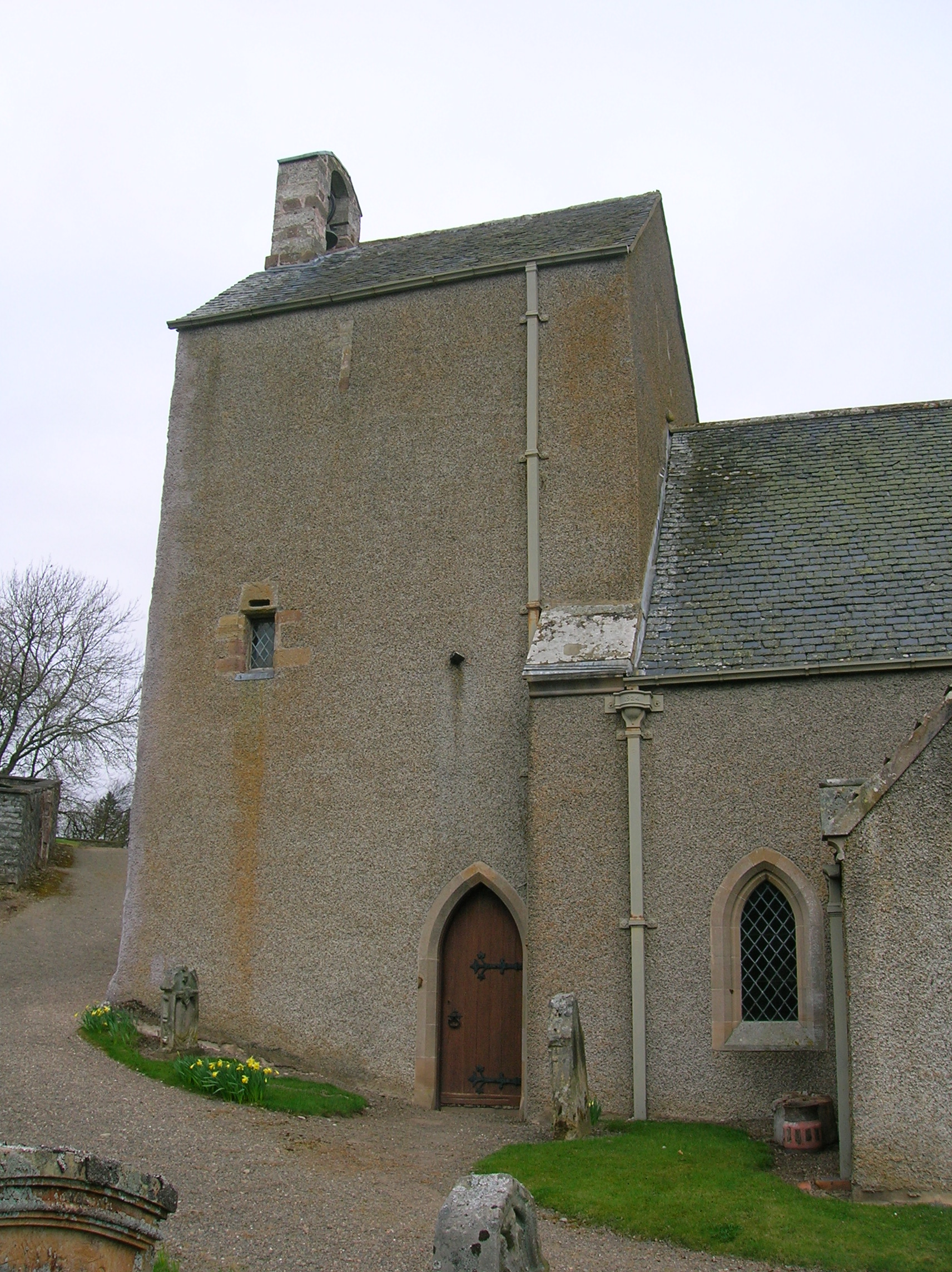
The kirk tower

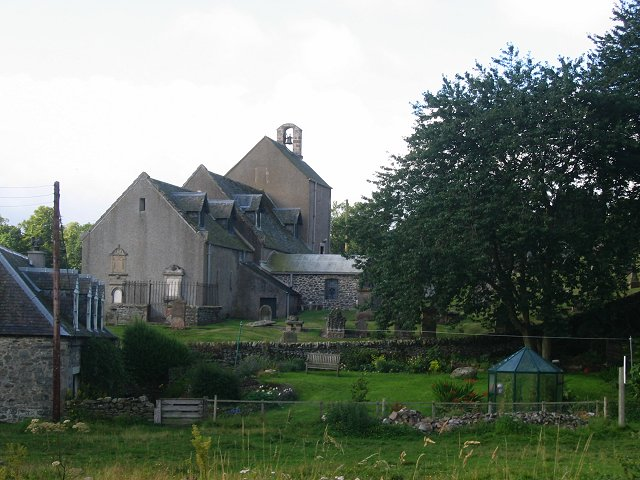
Stobo Kirk from the north-northeast (houses and gardens in foreground)

Reconstructed in 1928 in a style reminiscent of the Arts and Crafts Movement, in the erroneous belief that this was the site of Saint Kentigern's Chapel, the structure incorporates a standing stone in the wall. It was probably a chantry or mortuary aisle of the 15th century. The 14th burial slab of Robert Vesey, and others of a local miller and a knight in armour are preserved in the aisle. The altar stone may be linked to the conversion of Merlin Sylvestris by Saint Kentigern (Mungo).

=== Graves of Note ===
As part of the 1928 restoration three tombstones were moved from the floor to the chapel walls. The most important bears the inscription (in Latin) "Here lies Mr Robert Vessy sometime vicar of Stobo who died on the 10th day of May in the year of Our Lord 1473". A second shows a full-length figure of a man in partial armour with a sword by his side, dating from the second half of the 16th century. The third stone is incomplete.

=== Tower ===
The tower may be 12th-century in origin; however, it has been rebuilt several times. It gave access to the 'Laird's Loft' and now contains a meeting room as well as the vestry. Blocked-up windows of a likely 16th-century date are present.

=== Brass hanging lamps ===
The Balfour family of Stobo Castle presented a number of brass hanging lamps to the kirk and one of these has been identified as being manufactured in Nuremberg by Hans Muller between 1693 and 1701. The others are copies or by other Nuremberg craftsmen.

== 'Stobo Kirk' by James McIntosh Patrick ==
The kirk is the subject of paintings by the 20th-century Scottish landscape painter James McIntosh Patrick (1907–98), including the well-known 'Stobo Kirk' (1939) in the National Galleries of Scotland, Edinburgh.

== See also ==
- Dawyck Chapel
- List of places in the Scottish Borders
- List of listed buildings in Stobo, Scottish Borders

== Sources ==
- Groome, Francis H. (1903) Ordnance Gazetteer of Scotland. Vol. 1. London: Caxton Publishing Company
- Seymour, Camilla & Randall, John (2007) Stobo Kirk: a guide to the building and its history. Peebles: John Randall
