= Stobo Castle =

Castle in Scottish Borders, Scotland

Coordinates: 55.616506°N 3.314601°W

Designations

Inventory of Gardens and Designed Landscapes in Scotland
- Official name: Stobo Castle
- Designated: 30 June 1987
- Reference no.: GDL00349

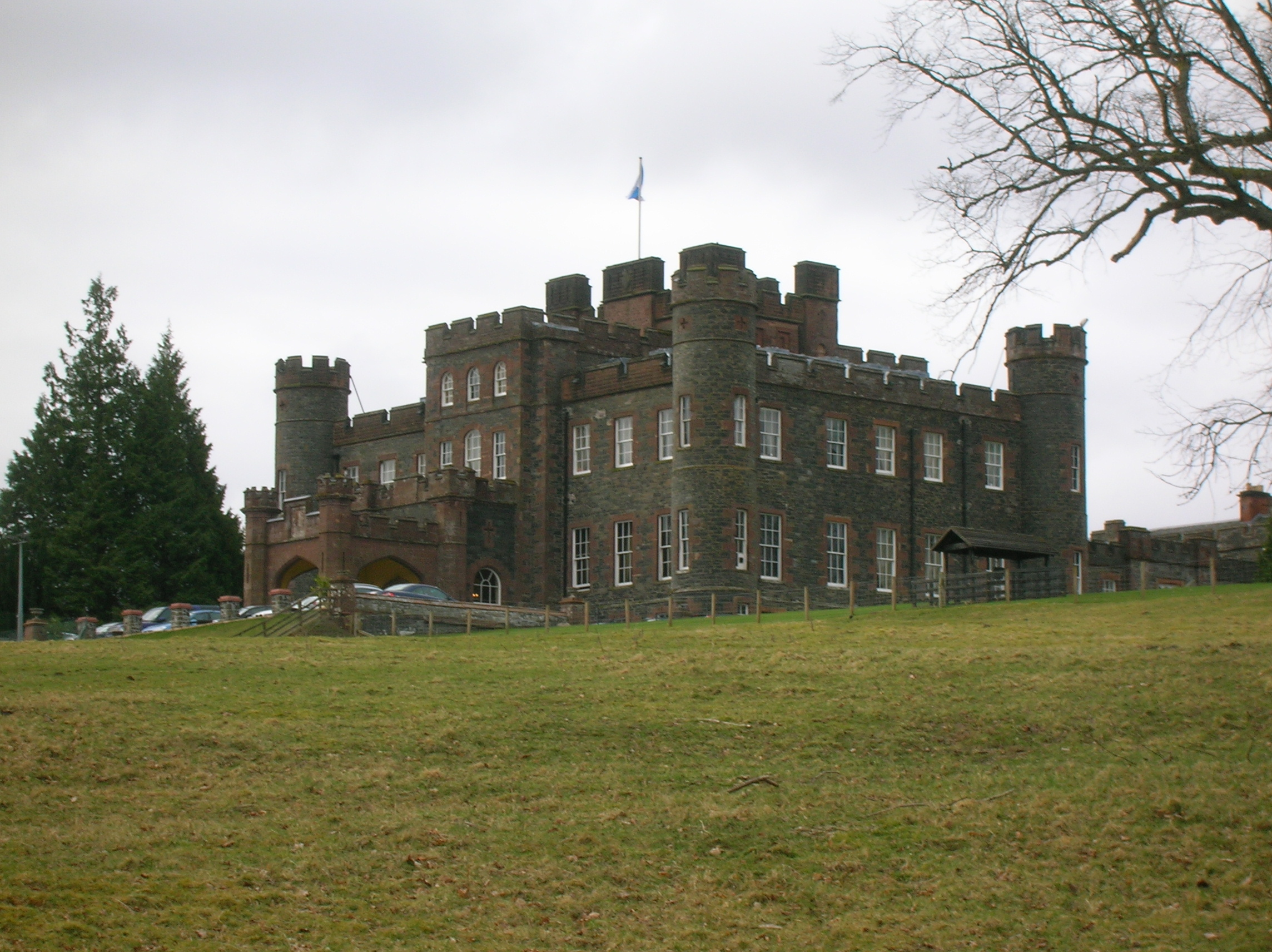
Stobo Castle

Stobo Castle is located at Stobo in the Scottish Borders, in the former county of Peeblesshire. The building of the present castle began in 1805 and was completed in 1811 under the supervision of architects Archibald and James Elliot. It is currently operated as a health spa. The house is protected as a category A listed building, while the grounds are included in the Inventory of Gardens and Designed Landscapes in Scotland, the national listing of significant parks and gardens. The estate lies on the B712, facing the River Tweed near its junction with the Lour Burn.

== History ==
Stobo Castle is the seat of the barony of Stobo, a feudal lordship that was created in 1577 with origins dating back to the twelfth century.

In 1650 (together with Dawyck House) Stobo estate was the first in Scotland to introduce the non-native species of horse chestnut.

A tower house, known as Hill House, formerly stood on the site of Stobo Castle. The Stobo estate was owned by the Murrays of Tweedsmuir around 1750. In 1767, the Stobo estate and its barony were bought by James Montgomery, a judge who served as Lord Advocate and Lord Chief Baron of the Scottish Exchequer from 1775. He was created a Baronet in 1801. On his death in 1803, his son James inherited the estate, and commissioned a new house from the architect James Elliot (brother and partner of Archibald Elliot). Stobo Castle was constructed between 1805 and 1811 in a castellated style. In 1849, the porte-cochère was added by Sir Graham Graham-Montgomery, 3rd Baronet, to a design by John Lessels. Sir Graham also had the grounds redesigned by John Hay in 1872.

In 1905, Stobo was sold to the English cricketer Hylton Philipson. A keen gardener, Philipson laid out the Japanese-influenced water gardens and terraces, and formed three large lakes on the estate. In 1939, after Philipson's death, the estate was sold again to Wenefryde Scott, 10th Countess of Dysart.

In the post-war years, the estate was subdivided, and the contents of the house were auctioned by Sotheby's in April 1972. Stobo Castle was purchased in 1975 by the Winyard family, who established a health resort. A large extension, incorporating new hotel rooms and a swimming pool, was opened in 2003.

As a result of these property disposals, the barony of Stobo is now held independently of ownership of either the castle or its surrounding lands (the Stobo Estate).

In late 2020, the 3,884-acre Stobo Estate was put up for sale with an asking price of £12 million. It was subsequently sold in seven lots and broken up.

== See also ==
- List of Category A listed buildings in the Scottish Borders
- List of listed buildings in Stobo, Scottish Borders
- Stobo Kirk
