= Broughton, Scottish Borders =

Village in Scottish Borders, Scotland

Coordinates: 55°36′54″N 3°24′39″W

Broughton
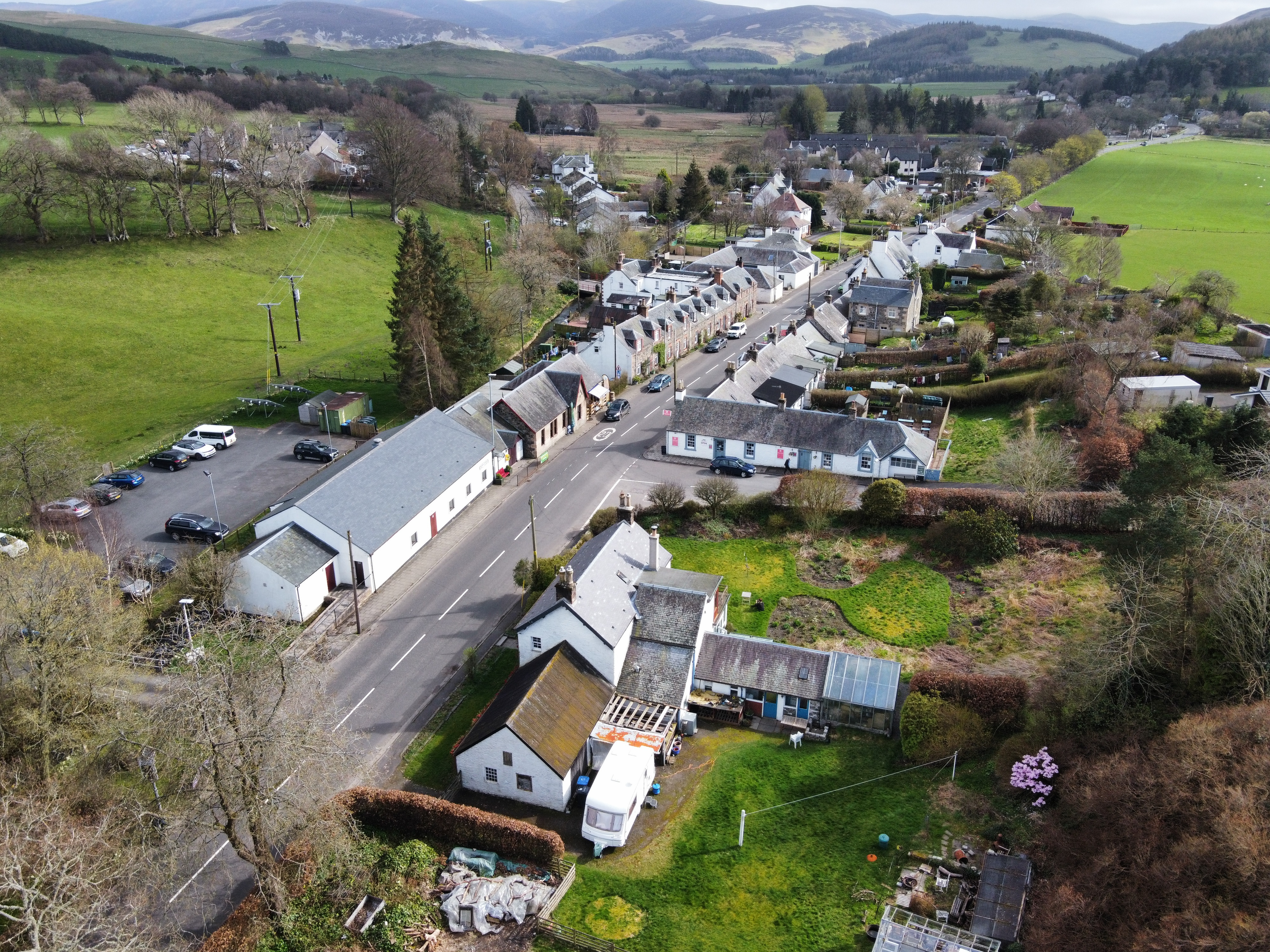
- Broughton from the northern end

- Location within Scotland
- Population: 306
- Lieutenancy area: Tweedale
- Country: Scotland
- Sovereign state: United Kingdom
- Police: Scotland
- Fire: Scottish
- Ambulance: Scottish
- UK Parliament: dumfriesshire, Clydesdale and Tweeddale
- Scottish Parliament: Midlothian South, Tweeddale and Lauderdale (Scottish Parliament constituency)

Broughton is a village in Tweeddale in the historical county of Peeblesshire in the Scottish Borders council area, in the south of Scotland, in the civil parish of Broughton, Glenholm and Kilbucho and Upper Tweed Community Council. Broughton is on the Biggar Water, near where it flows into the River Tweed. It is about 7 km east of Biggar, and 15 km west of Peebles.

The village has a pre-school nursery, primary school, playpark, public w.c, village store, tearoom/bistro, bowling green, tennis courts, a village hall and garage. Since 1979, the village has been home to Broughton Ales, Scotland's original independent microbrewery. Most of the buildings were built by James Dickson in the 1750s, mostly using local stone. In 2001 the census population was recorded at 306.

== Culture ==
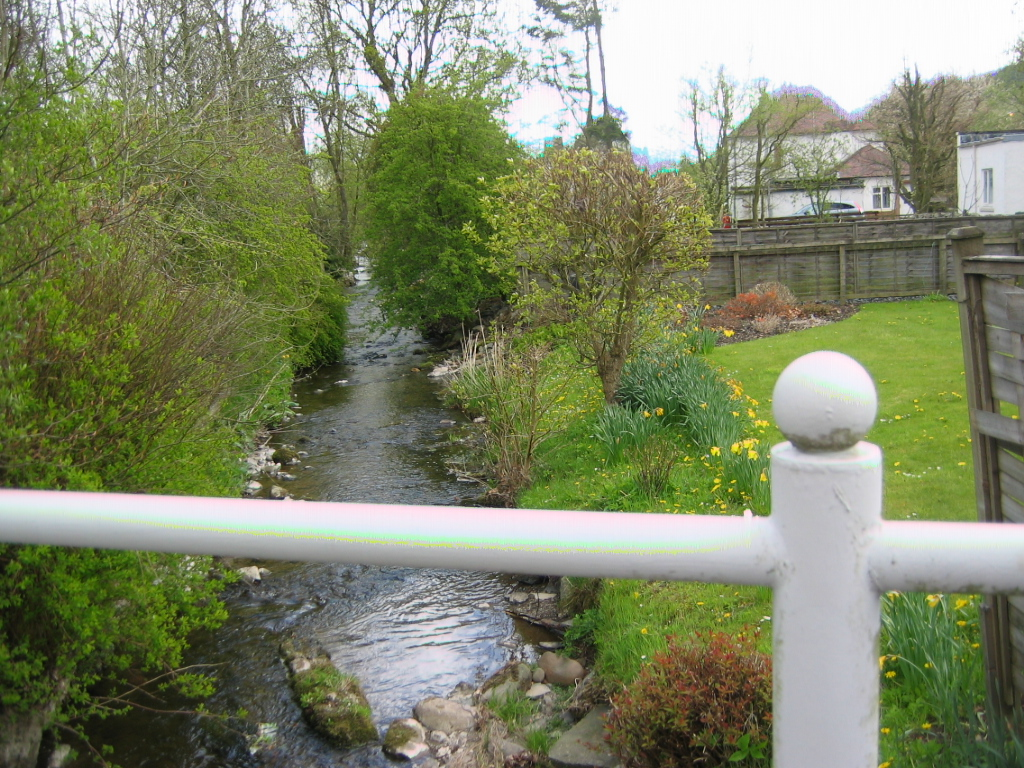
Broughton Burn, from Dreva Road

The village is best known as the one-time home of John Buchan. The Biggar Museum Trust runs a museum dedicated to his life in Peebles, moving it from its original home in Broughton. The Museum moved to Biggar, five miles west of Broughton, and is now known as the Biggar and Upper Clydesdale Museum. Broughton is also home to Broughton Place, a private house built in the style of a 17th-century Scottish tower house, which was designed by Basil Spence in 1938 and incorporates decorative reliefs by architectural sculptor Hew Lorimer. The village contains six listed buildings.

== Old Church ==
The site of the old church is said to have been occupied since the 12th century, but was substantially rebuilt in the mid 18th century and abandoned in 1803 at which time the church was relocated to nearby Calzeat.

== Transport ==
The Symington, Biggar and Broughton Railway had a station and its headquarters here, which was later absorbed into the Caledonian Railway. The line is now closed. The Talla Railway led from here to the Talla Reservoir.

The village is located on the A701 and B7106 roads, and is located at the western end point of the John Buchan Way footpath.. There is a roughly 5 mile off road route to the nearby market town of Biggar, known as "the Old Railway" track, suitable for walking, bikes and equestrian use. A bus route operated by Borders Buses links Broughton to Biggar and Peebles.

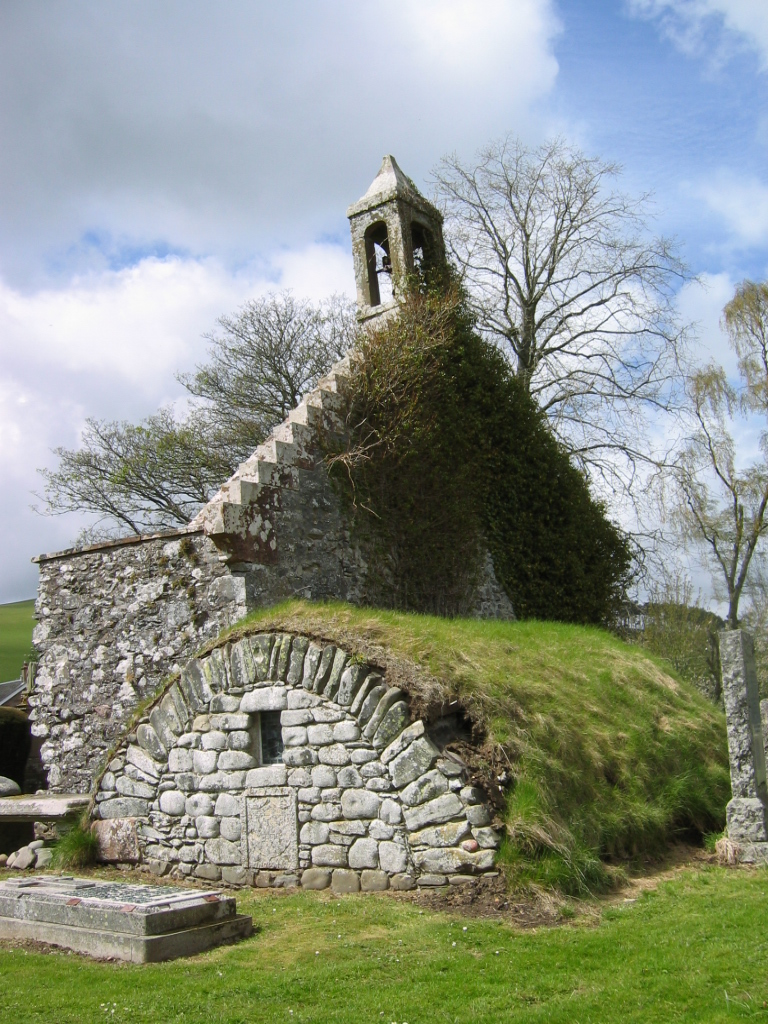
Broughton, kirk ruin

== Notable residents ==
- Sir John Murray of Broughton (c. 1718–1777), Jacobite secretary to Prince Charles Edward Stuart ('Bonnie Prince Charlie') during the Jacobite Rising of 1745
- Sir David Murray, 4th Baronet (died 1769), Jacobite soldier
- Alexander Murray (1789–1845), MP for Kirkcudbright Stewartry 1838–45
- Frederick Boothby (1909–1979), military and paramilitary leader
- Michael Strachan (1919–2000), businessman and author

== See also ==
- List of places in the Scottish Borders
