= Montgomery baronets of Stanhope (1801) =

The Montgomery baronetcy, of Stanhope in the County of Peebles, was created in the Baronetage of the United Kingdom on 16 July 1801 for the Scottish lawyer and politician James Montgomery. The second Baronet represented Peeblesshire in Parliament. The third Baronet represented both Peebles and Peebles and Selkirk in Parliament. He assumed the additional surname of Graham. The seventh Baronet was Lord-Lieutenant of Kinross-shire. He assumed the surname of Purvis-Russell-Montgomery in 1906 and Purvis-Russell-Hamilton-Montgomery in 1933. The eighth and ninth Baronet have used the surname Montgomery only. The ninth Baronet was Lord-Lieutenant of Perth and Kinross.

== Montgomery, later Graham-Montgomery, later Purvis-Russell-Montgomery, later Montgomery baronets, of Stanhope (1801) ==
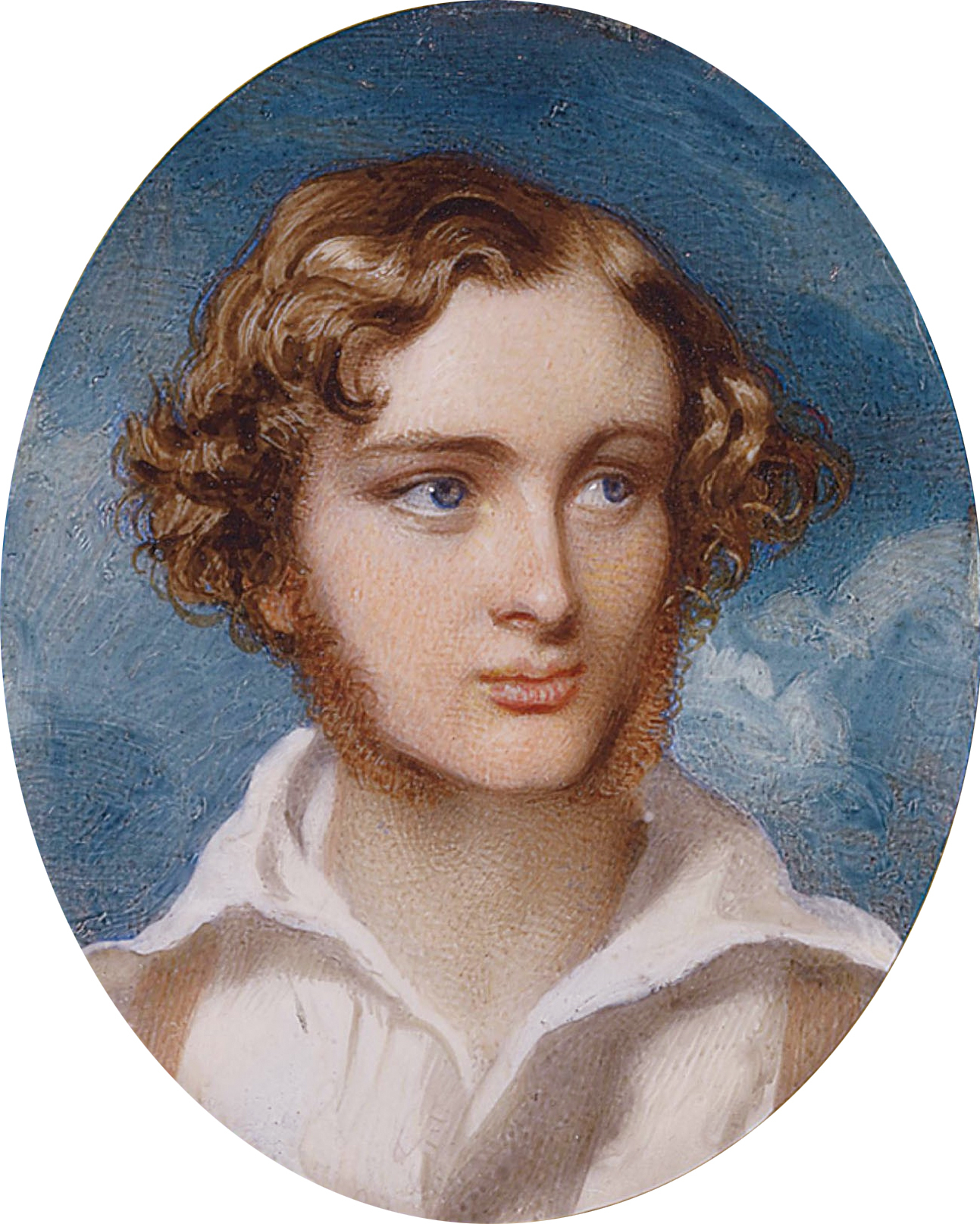
Sir Graham Graham-Montgomery, 3rd Baronet, of Stanhope, by Robert Thorburn (1818–1885)

- Sir James Montgomery, 1st Baronet (1721–1803)
- Sir James Montgomery, 2nd Baronet (1766–1839)
- Sir Graham Graham-Montgomery, 3rd Baronet (1823–1901)
- Sir James Graham-Montgomery, 4th Baronet (1850–1902)
- Sir Basil Templer Graham-Montgomery, 5th Baronet (1852–1928)
- The Reverend Sir Charles Percy Graham-Montgomery, 6th Baronet (6 September 1855 – 1 April 1930).
- Sir Henry James Purvis-Russell-Hamilton-Montgomery, 7th Baronet (1859–1947)
- Sir Basil Purvis-Russell-Montgomery, 8th Baronet (1884–1964)
  - Lt.-Col. Henry Keith Purvis-Russell-Montgomery (1896–1954), 2nd and youngest son of the 7th Baronet
- Sir Basil Henry David Montgomery, 9th Baronet (1931–2026), only son of Lt.-Col. Henry Purvis-Russell-Montgomery.
- Sir James David Keith Montgomery, 10th Baronet (born 1957), eldest son of the 9th Baronet.

The heir apparent to the baronetcy is Edward Henry James Montgomery (born 1986), son of the 10th Baronet.

== Notes ==
Baronetage of the United Kingdom
Preceded by de Bathe baronets	Montgomery baronets of Stanhope; 16 July 1801	Succeeded by Douglas baronets
