= Montgomery baronets of Magbie Hill (1774) =

The Montgomery baronetcy, of Magbie Hill in Peeblesshire, was created in the Baronetage of Great Britain on 28 May 1774 for William Montgomery. The second Baronet represented Peeblesshire in Parliament. The title became extinct on his death in 1831.

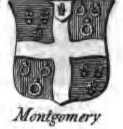
Arms of the Montgomery Baronets of Magbie Hill

== Montgomery baronets, of Magbie Hill (1774) ==
- Sir William Montgomery, 1st Baronet (1717–1788). He was Member of the Parliament of Ireland for Ballynakill.
- Sir George Montgomery, 2nd Baronet (1765–1831).

== Notes ==
Baronetage of Great Britain
Preceded by Jones baronets	Montgomery baronets of Magbie Hill; 28 May 1774	Succeeded by Gibbes baronets
