= Charles Percy Graham-Montgomery =

English Anglican priest

The Reverend Sir Charles Percy Graham-Montgomery, 6th Baronet (died 1930) was an English clergyman. He was the son of Sir Graham Graham-Montgomery, 3rd Baronet, and Alice Hope Johnstone.

He was educated at Winchester and Emmanuel College, Cambridge, graduating B.A. in 1880 and M.A. in 1884. Ordained deacon in 1880, and priest in 1883, he held a succession of clerical posts, ending as the Vicar of St. John's, Taunton from 1903 until his retirement to Stobo Castle in 1915. He succeeded in the baronetcy on 4 October 1928.

== Family ==
Graham-Montgomery married, firstly, Minnie Gertrude Compton Walker, daughter of Major-General Chamberlain Walker, in 1887. They had two children: Graham John Early Graham-Montgomery (18 June 1894 – 24 April 1917) and Percy Cecil Graham-Montgomery (6 September 1898 – 21 April 1915): both boys attended Sherborne School in Dorset. He married, secondly, Rose Kathleen Sullivan, daughter of Peter John Sullivan, in 1923. They had no children.

First Marriage (m. 1887) Minnie Gertrude Compton Walker (?-?)

1. Graham John Early Graham-Montgomery (1894–1917) Captain in the Hampshire Regiment.
2. Percy Cecil Graham-Montgomery (1898–1915)
- Both sons died during the lifetime of their father.

Second Marriage (m. 1923) Rose Kathleen Sullivan (?-?)

- Marriage was without issue.

== Titles ==
Peerage of the United Kingdom
Preceded by Basil Templer Graham-Montgomery	Baronet (of Stanhope); 1928–1930	Succeeded by Henry James Purvis-Russell-Hamilton-Montgomery

== See also ==
- Montgomery baronets
- Montgomery of Stanhope baronets (1801)
- Graham-Montgomery baronets
