= James Graham-Montgomery =

Scottish British Army officer and landowner

Lieutenant-Colonel Sir James Gordon Henry Graham-Montgomery, 4th Baronet (1850 – 7 November 1902) was a Scottish British Army officer and landowner.

== Biography ==
Graham-Montgomery was the son of Sir Graham Graham-Montgomery, 3rd Baronet (1823–1901) and Alice Hope Johnstone (d.1890). He was educated at Eton College, and succeeded his father in the title of Baronet Montgomery of Stanhope in June 1901. With his succession, he also inherited Stobo Castle, in the Scottish Borders, in the former county of Peeblesshire. The Manor of Stobo had been the family seat of the Graham-Montgomery Baronets from 1767, and the castle itself was constructed between 1803 and 1811 for his grandfather Sir James Montgomery, 2nd Baronet, then remodelled for his father who also had the grounds redesigned in 1872.

== Military career ==
Graham-Montgomery was commissioned into the Coldstream Guards as a lieutenant in 1869, and saw active service with his regiment in Egypt during the Anglo-Egyptian War in 1882, where he was present at the Battle of Tell El Kebir. For his service he received the Egypt Medal and the Khedive's Star. He retired from the army in 1889 with the rank of lieutenant-colonel.

== Death ==
Graham-Montgomery met with a violent death on 7 November 1902, when he was hit by a train near Seaton Junction railway station, Lincolnshire. He was traveling by train from Edinburgh to London St. Pancras and had apparently opened the door of a compartment while the train was in motion, and fallen on the line, where he was hit by a passing train on the neighbouring track. His head was badly injured and one foot was severed. He died 10 minutes after the accident.

He was unmarried, and the title and estate was inherited by his brother, Sir Basil Templer Graham-Montgomery, 5th Baronet.

Peerage of the United Kingdom
Preceded by Graham Graham-Montgomery	Baronet (of Stanhope); 1901–1902	Succeeded by Basil Templer Graham-Montgomery
