= Basil Templer Graham-Montgomery =

British soldier and baronet (1852-1928)

Sir Basil Templer Graham-Montgomery, 5th Baronet (1 March 1852 – 4 October 1928) was the son of Sir Graham Graham-Montgomery, 3rd Baronet Stanhope (9 July 1823 – 2 June 1901) and Alice Hope Johnstone (1830 - 16 December 1890). He succeeded to the title of 5th Baronet Montgomery of Stanhope on 8 November 1902.

Graham-Montgomery invented a pattern of leather webgear similar to the Sam Browne Belt that became part of the dress uniform for Rifle Regiment officers.

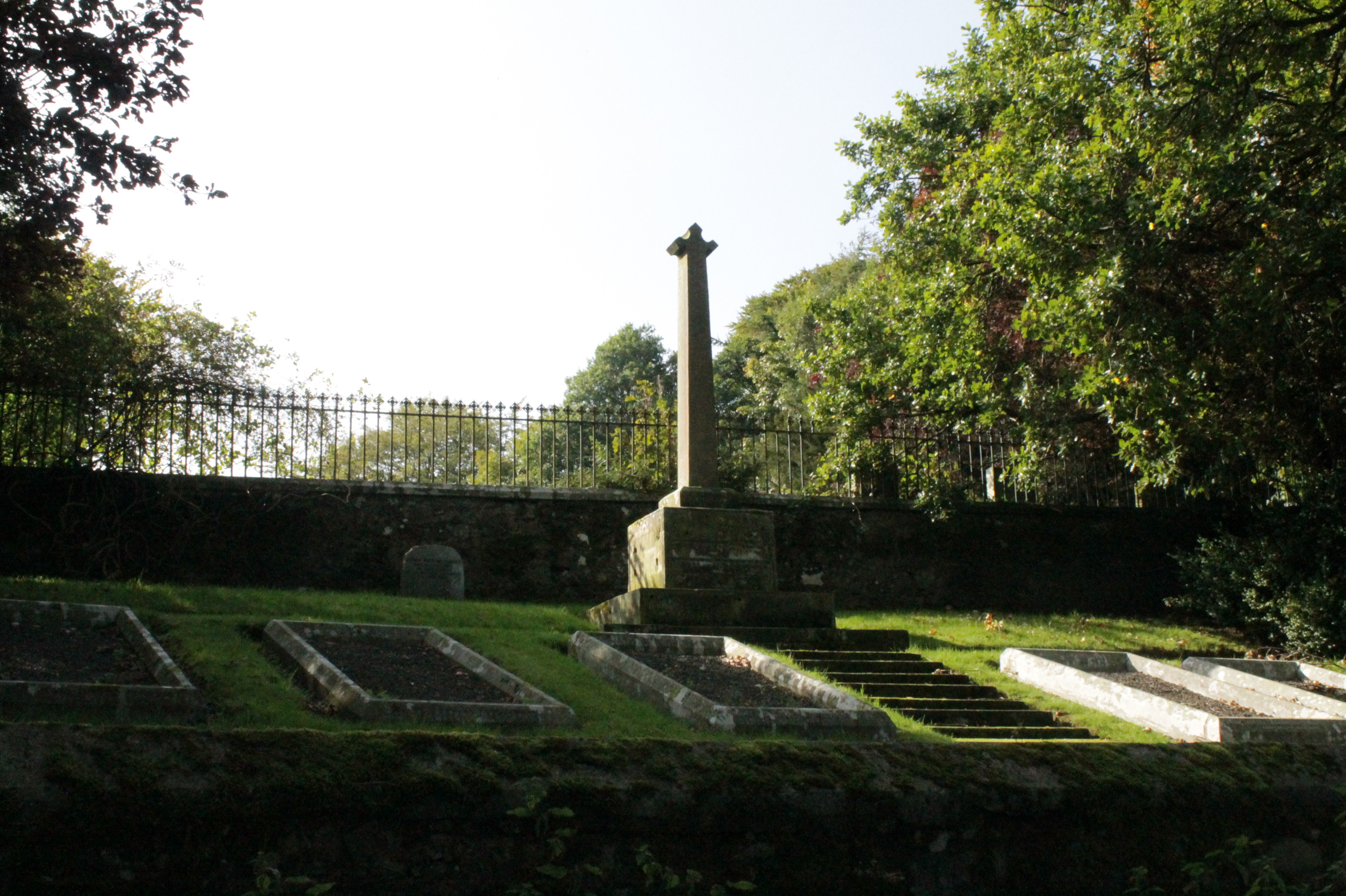
The Graham-Montgomery grave east of Kinross House

He is buried with his family in ground east of Kinross House.

== Military career ==
He gained the rank of lieutenant in the service of the 60th Rifles. He gained the rank of honorary lieutenant-colonel in the service of the Kinross-shire Volunteer Regiment.

He was appointed a deputy lieutenant for Kinross-shire in February 1903.

== Family ==
He married, firstly, Mary Katherine Moncreiffe, daughter of Sir Thomas Moncreiffe of that Ilk, 7th Baronet Moncreiffe. and Lady Louisa Hay-Drummond, on 26 October 1880. He and Mary Katherine Moncreiffe were divorced in 1905.

He married, secondly, Theresa Blanche Verschoyle, daughter of Lt.-Col. Henry William Verschoyle, on 6 June 1905. He died on 4 October 1928 at age 76, without male issue.

First Marriage (m.1880 - 1905) Mary Katherine Moncreiffe (3 December 1858 – 30 July 1910)

1. Walter Basil Graham-Montgomery (July 1881 - 23 March 1928)
2. Lena Graham-Montgomery (October 1882 - 22 September 1958)
- The son died in the lifetime of the father.

Second Marriage (m. 1905 - 1928) Theresa Blanche Verschoyle (April 1862 - 24 June 1936)

- Marriage produced no issue.

Peerage of the United Kingdom
| Preceded by James Graham-Montgomery | Baronet (of Stanhope); 1902–1928 | Succeeded by Charles Graham-Montgomery |
