= Marcus Paterson =

Irish politician (1712–1787)

Marcus Paterson (1712 – 12 March 1787) was an Irish politician, Solicitor-General for Ireland and Chief Justice of the Irish Common Pleas. He became the Member of Parliament for Ballynakill in 1756 and Lisburn in 1768. He was appointed as Solicitor-General in 1764 and became Chief Justice of Common Pleas in 1770. He held office until his death although he had been contemplating retirement due to ill health.

He was a native of Ennis, County Clare; and was the third son of Montrose Paterson. The Paterson family settled in Ennis in the eighteenth century and became substantial landowners in the area. He went to school in Limerick and graduated from Trinity College Dublin.

In character, he seems to have been a typical eighteenth-century rake: he was famed for his hospitality, shortened his life by heavy drinking and fought numerous duels. John Scott, 1st Earl of Clonmell called him one of those old men who die because they insist on living like young men. On the other hand, he was a considerable scholar, a fine lawyer and a diligent and zealous law officer. He died near Bray on 12 March 1787.

He was married and had a son, also called Marcus (c.1744-1768). The younger Marcus joined the British Army and was sent to America, where he died of a fever at Fort de Chartres, on the Mississippi River. The judge's estate passed to his nephew, yet another Marcus Paterson.

Parliament of Ireland
Preceded by John Barrington; Jonah Barrington	Member of Parliament for Ballynakill; 1756–1768; With: Jonah Barrington 1756–1761; Charles O'Hara 1761–1768	Succeeded by William Montgomery; John Moore
Preceded by Francis Price; Viscount Beauchamp	Member of Parliament for Lisburn; 1768–1771; With: Francis Price	Succeeded by Francis Price; Hon. Robert Seymour-Conway
Legal offices
Preceded by John Gore	Solicitor-General for Ireland; 1764–1770	Succeeded by Godfrey Lill
Preceded by Richard Clayton	Chief Justice of the Irish Common Pleas; 1770–1787	Succeeded by Hugh Carleton
