= Adam Hay (Peeblesshire MP) =

Scottish officer in the British Army and politician

Member of Parliament for Peeblesshire
- In office 1767–1768
- Preceded by: John Dickson
- Succeeded by: James William Montgomery

Member of Parliament for Peeblesshire
- In office June 1775 – November 1775
- Preceded by: James William Montgomery
- Succeeded by: Sir Robert Murray Keith

Adam Hay (after 1684 – 15 November 1775) was a Scottish officer in the British Army and a politician who sat in the House of Commons between 1767 and 1775.

He was the second surviving of John Hay of Haystoun, sheriff-depute of Peebles. His first marriage was to a Miss Britland of Nottingham. His second wife was Caroline Lucy Harpur, the daughter of Sir Henry Harpur, 5th Baronet and brother of Sir Henry Harpur, 6th Baronet.

He was the Member of Parliament (MP) for Peeblesshire from 1767 to 1768, and from June 1775 until his death in November that year. He was buried on 25 November 1775 at Calke, Derbyshire, the home of his second wife Caroline Lucy Harpur

Parliament of Great Britain
Preceded by John Dickson	Member of Parliament for Peeblesshire; 1767–1768	Succeeded by James William Montgomery
Preceded by James William Montgomery	Member of Parliament for Peeblesshire; June – November 1775	Succeeded by Sir Robert Murray Keith
