= De Bathe baronets =

Extinct baronetcy in the Baronetage of the United Kingdom

Escutcheon of the de Bathe baronets of Knightstown

The de Bathe baronetcy, of Knightstown, Cashel, and Ladyrath, in the County of Meath, was created on 7 July 1801 for James de Bathe. It became extinct upon the death of the 6th baronet, in 1941.

== de Bathe baronets of Knightstown, County Meath (1801) ==
- Sir James Michael de Bathe, 1st Baronet (died 22 February 1808)
- Sir James Wynne de Bathe, 2nd Baronet (1792–1828), known as a friend of Lord Byron. He was succeeded by his brother:
- Sir William Plunkett de Bathe, 3rd Baronet (1793–1870)
- General Sir (Gerald) Henry Percival de Bathe, 4th Baronet (1823–1907). He was present at Queen Victoria's Coronation and funeral in an official capacity.
- Sir Hugo Gerald de Bathe, 5th Baronet (10 August 1871 – 1940). His first marriage in 1899 was to Lillie Langtry (1853–1929) as her second husband. They were married until her death in 1929. His second marriage, on 12 May 1931 at Ajaccio, Corsica, was to Deborah Warschowsky, daughter of Samuel Warschowsky and the former wife of Paul Henius. His heir was his nephew:
- Sir Christopher Albert de Bathe, 6th Baronet (1905–1941). He was a Pilot Officer, RAFVR; he married 1932 Edna Winifred Terrell; one daughter—Charlotte Louise de Bathe (born 1934), since 1967 Mrs Arthur Cyril Bryan.

Baronetage of the United Kingdom
| Preceded by Barrett-Lennard baronets | de Bathe baronets of Knightstown; 7 July 1801 | Succeeded by Montgomery baronets |
