= Sir William Montgomery, 1st Baronet =

Scottish-born politician in Ireland (1717–1788)

Sir William Montgomery, 1st Baronet (9 November 1717 – 25 December 1788) was a Scottish-born politician in Ireland.

== Biography ==
Montgomery was born in Scotland, the son of William Montgomery of Magbie Hill in Peeblesshire. His family was a cadet branch of the Earls of Eglinton. Montgomery migrated to Dublin, where he prospered as a contractor for the Irish Army.

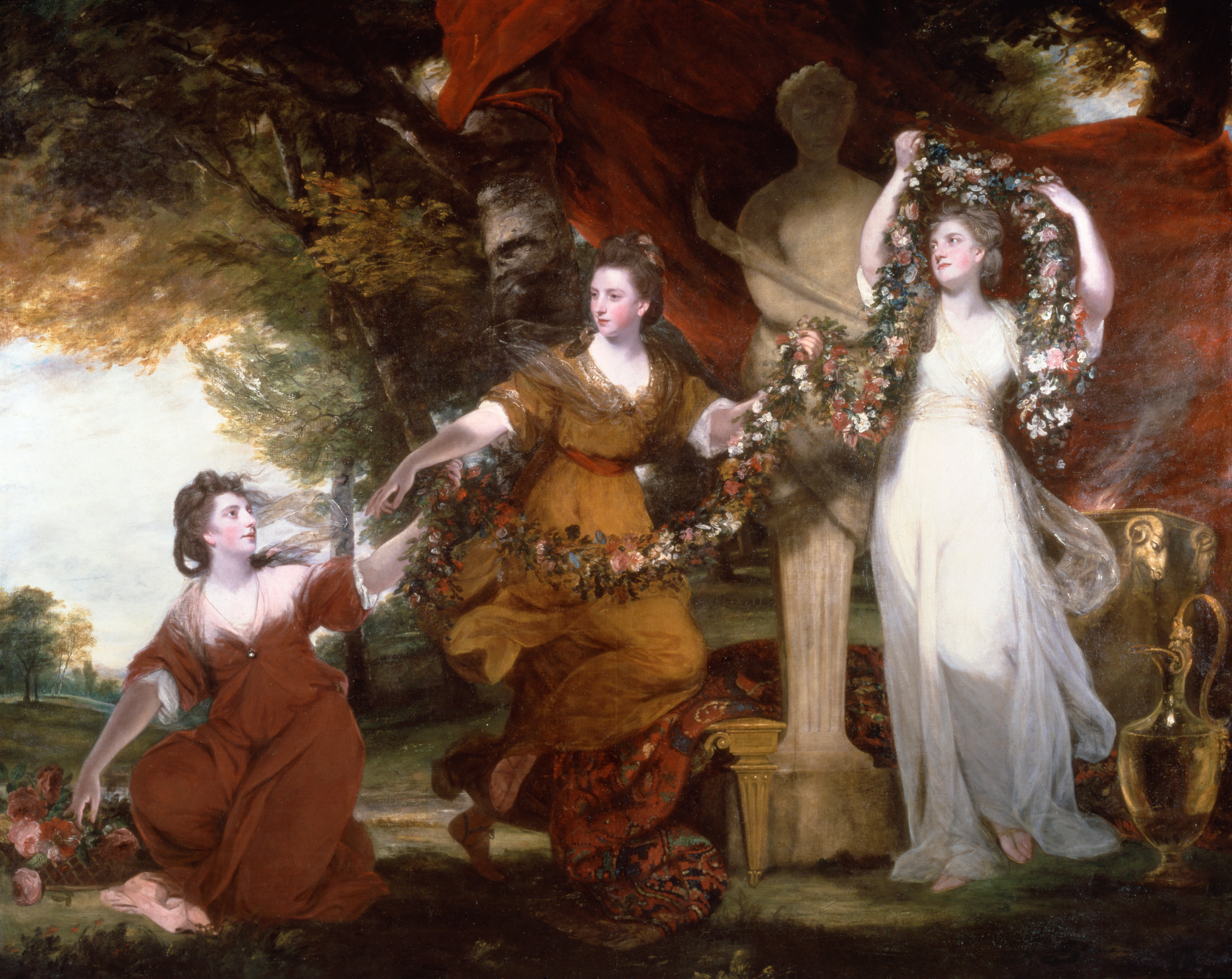
Three Ladies Adorning a Term of Hymen by Joshua Reynolds, 1773. It depicts the three daughters from Montgomery's first marriage

William married firstly Hannah, the daughter of Alexander Tomkins of County Londonderry, by whom he had a son, William (died 1777) and three daughters (Elizabeth, Anne and Barbara). Elizabeth Gardiner, Viscountess Mountjoy married Luke Gardiner, 1st Viscount Mountjoy, Anne Townshend, Marchioness Townshend married George Townshend, 1st Marquess Townshend, and Barbara Beresford, Lady Waterford married as his second wife John Beresford (Waterford MP).

William married secondly Anne Evatt, daughter of Humphrey Evatt of County Monaghan, by whom he had two sons, Sir George Montgomery, 2nd Baronet and Robert Montgomery Col. 19th Foot, as well as three daughters (Amelia, Harriet and Jane). Amelia Beresford married Rev. Charles Cobbe Beresford (son of John Beresford), Harriet Byng (1773-1854) married George Byng (1764–1847), and Jane Reynell married Lt-Col. William Reynell of Castle Rynell.

In 1768 he was elected to the Irish House of Commons as a member of parliament for Ballynakil. He continued to represent the seat until his death in 1788. On 28 May 1774, Montgomery was made a baronet, of Magbie Hill in the Baronetage of Great Britain. Upon his death he was succeeded in his title by his only living son by his second wife, George Montgomery.

Parliament of Ireland
Preceded by Marcus Paterson; Charles O'Hara	Member of Parliament for Ballynakil; 1768–1788; With: John Moore (1768–1783); John Moore (1783–1788)	Succeeded by John Egan; John Moore
Baronetage of Great Britain
New title	Baronet (of Magbie Hill); 1774–1788	Succeeded by George Montgomery
