= Lord Lieutenant of Perth and Kinross =

Ceremonial officer in Perth and Kinross, Scotland

This is a list of people who have served as Lord-lieutenant of Perth and Kinross. The office replaced the Lord Lieutenant of Perthshire and the Lord Lieutenant of Kinross-shire in 1975.

- Butter had been Lord Lieutenant of Perthshire
- Sir David Butter 1975–1995
- Sir David Montgomery, 9th Baronet 11 April 1995 – 2006
- Brig Sir Melville Stewart Jameson 14 August 2006 – 2019
- Gordon Kenneth Stephen Leckie 23 July 2019 – present
