= Stephen Leckie =

Lord Lieutant of Perth and Kinross

- Occupation: Businessman
- Known for: Lord Lieutenant of Perth and Kinross

Gordon Kenneth Stephen Leckie is a Scottish businessman. He was appointed Lord Lieutenant of Perth and Kinross (the King's representative in the region) in 2019, having previously been Deputy Lieutenant since 2012.

Leckie is chief executive of the Crieff Hydro hotels group, has been Chairman of VisitScotland since 2024 and was President of the Scottish Chambers of Commerce (SCC) from 2021 to 2024.

He was chairman of the Scottish Tourism Alliance until 2024, and was previously president of the Perthshire Chamber of Commerce. He also chaired the Scottish Government's tourism leadership group, responsible for the national tourism strategy, Tourism Scotland 2020.

In 2013, Leckie was awarded a Silver Thistle tourism award.
