= Sir James Montgomery, 1st Baronet =

Scottish advocate, judge, and politician (1721–1803)

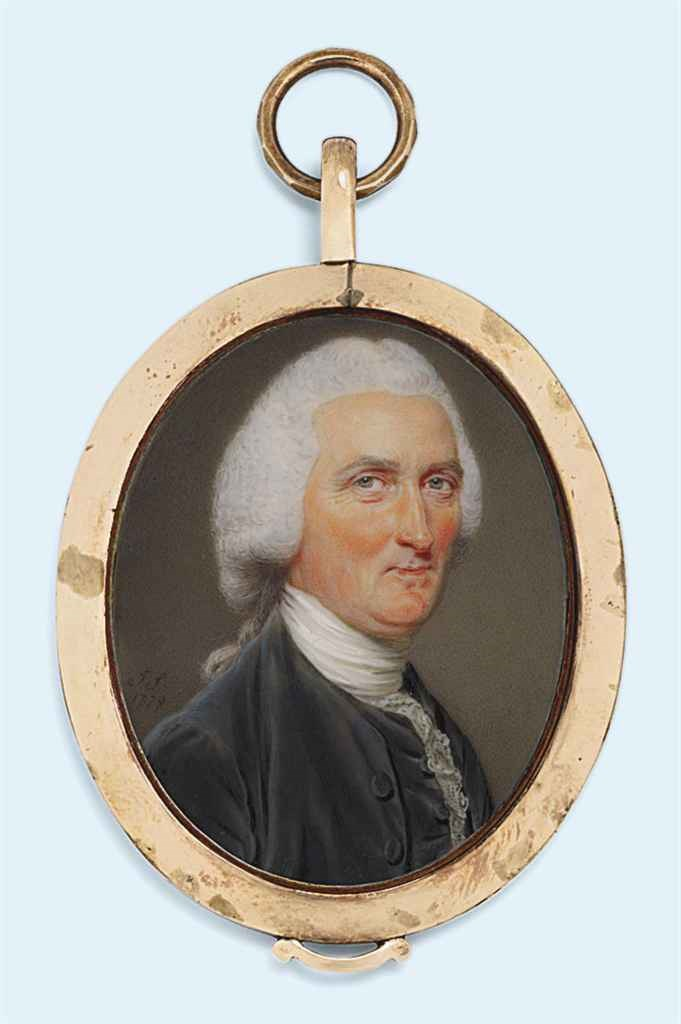
- portrait by John Smart
- Born: October 1721; Peeblesshire
- Died: 2 April 1803 (aged 81–82)
- Occupation: Judge, politician
- Spouse(s): Margaret Scott
- Children: 7, including Sir James Montgomery, 2nd Baronet
- Parent(s): William Montgomery of Magbiehill; Barbara Rutherford

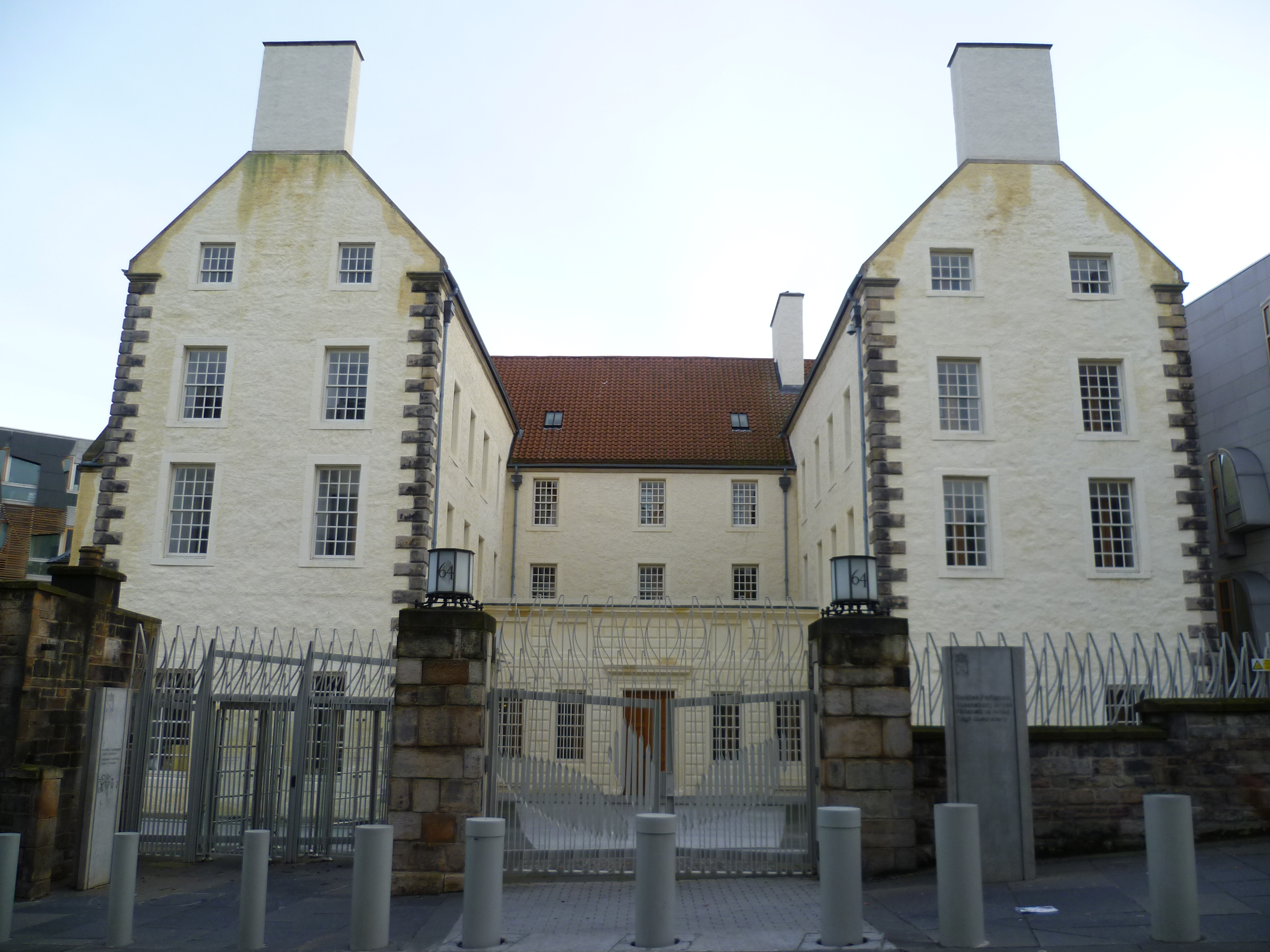
Queensberry House, Canongate Edinburgh

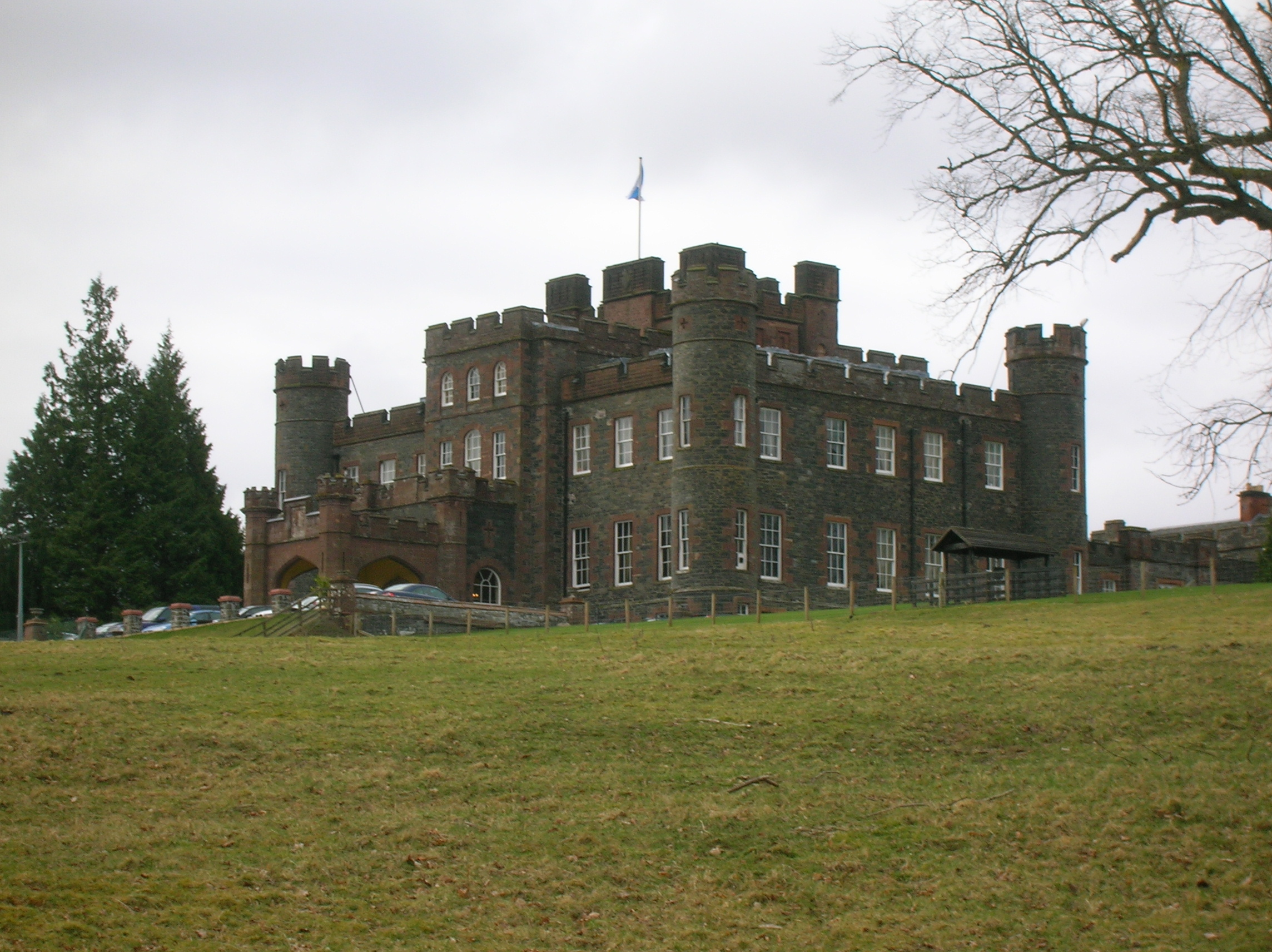
Stobo Castle, Scottish Borders

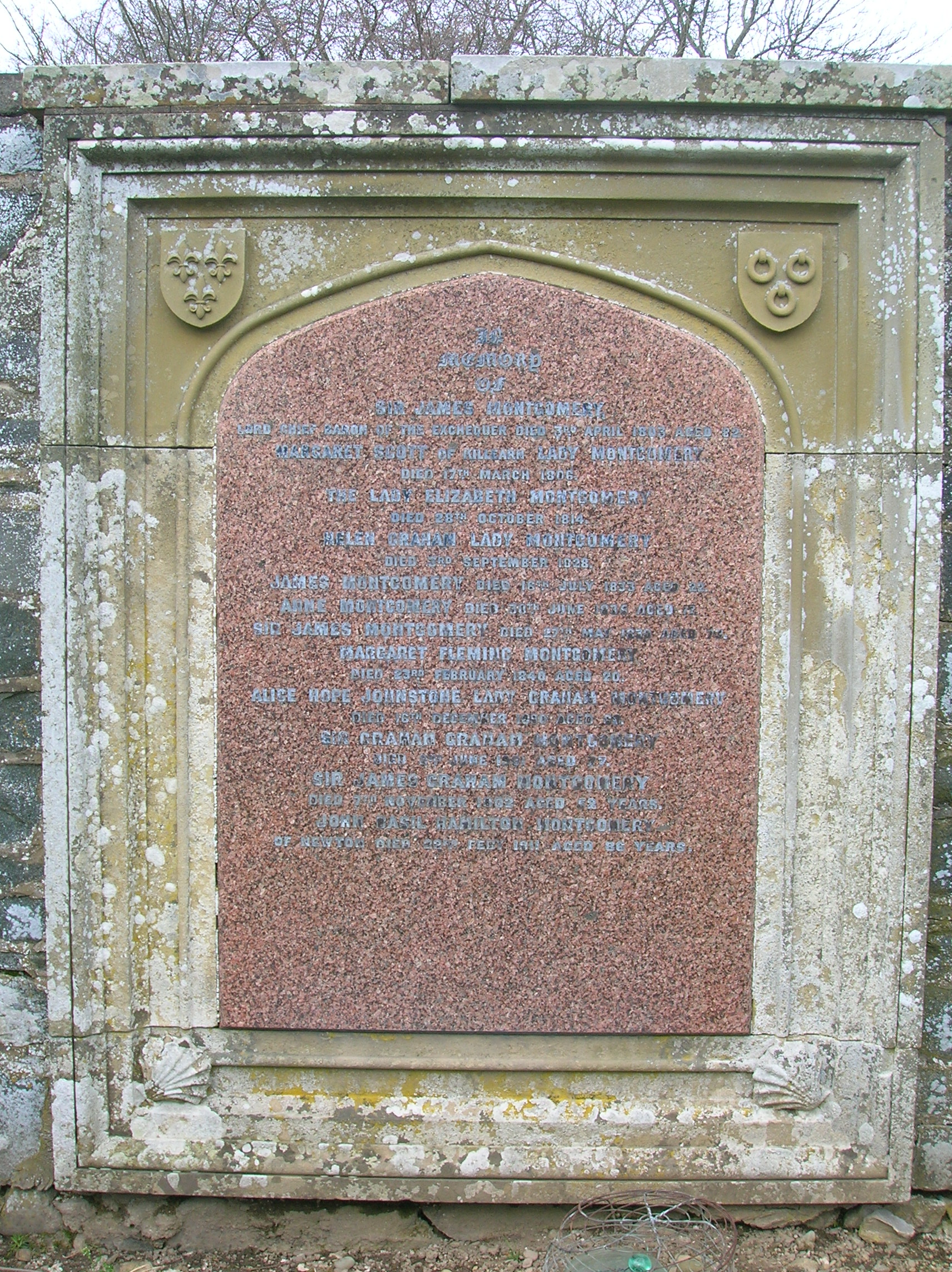
Sir James Montgomery's gravestone at Stobo Kirk

Sir James Montgomery, 1st Baronet Stanhope, FRSE (1721 – 2 April 1803) was a Scottish advocate, judge, country landowner, agriculturalist and politician who sat in the House of Commons from 1766 to 1775. In 1783 he was a joint founder of the Royal Society of Edinburgh.

== Life ==
Montgomery was born at Macbie Hill in Peeblesshire in October 1721, the second son of William Montgomery, Sheriff-Depute of Peeblesshire, of Coldcoat or Macbie Hill, Peeblesshire. His mother was Barbara Rutherford, daughter of Robert Rutherford of Bowland, Stow, Midlothian. In Edinburgh he resided at Queensberry House on the Royal Mile and was its last resident as a private house. Here he famously had a black servant named "Hannibal".

After schooling at the parish school at West Linton, Montgomery studied law at the University of Edinburgh, and was called to the Scottish bar on 19 February 1743. In 1748, after heritable jurisdictions had been abolished, he was appointed the first sheriff of Peebles under the new system. On 30 April 1760, thanks to the influence of his friend Robert Dundas, then newly appointed lord president, he succeeded Sir Thomas Miller, Lord Glenlee as Solicitor General for Scotland jointly with Francis Garden (1721–1793).

In 1763 he purchased the Whim experimental farm (south of Penicuik) from the estate of the late Archibald Campbell, 3rd Duke of Argyll. He added a north wing to match the recent south wing, plus added a full storey in height. He employed James Robertson, a pupil of Capability Brown, to beautify the landscape.

In 1764, he became sole solicitor-general, and in 1766 Lord Advocate in succession to Miller, to whose parliamentary seat for the Dumfries Burghs he succeeded also.

But at the general election of 1768, Montgomery was returned for Peeblesshire, a seat which he retained till he was raised to the bench. A learned lawyer and an improving landlord, he was peculiarly fitted to deal with the question of entails, which had now become pressing, owing to the extent to which details fettered the practical management of land. The existing statute was Sir George Mackenzie's Act of 1685, and since it passed 485 deeds of entail had been registered under it. The public demanded a reform; the Faculty of Advocates had passed resolutions approving it. Montgomery accordingly introduced a measure in March 1770, which passed into law (10 Geo. Ill, c. 51) and considerably enlarged the powers of the heir of an entail in respect of leasing and improving the entailed lands, and even provided for the exchange of land in spite of an entail.

Though he remained in parliament, Montgomery took little further interest in its proceedings after the passage of his bill. In June 1775, he was created Lord Chief Baron of the Scottish Exchequer, and in 1781 he was elected fellow of the Society of Antiquaries of Scotland; he resigned his judgeship in April 1801. In July 1801, he was created a Baronet.

Montgomery was, like his father, skilled in farming, and in 1763 bought a half-reclaimed estate of Lord Islay's in Peeblesshire, originally called Blair Bog, but afterwards 'The Whim,' which eventually became his favourite residence. In 1767, he bought for £40,000 Stanhope and Stobo with its feudal barony in Peeblesshire, part of the estates of Sir David Murray, 4th Baronet, which had been confiscated for their owner's complicity in the Jacobite rising of 1745. He thenceforward chiefly resided in the country, where his good methods of farming and the improvements which he promoted, notably the Peebles and Edinburgh road in 1770, gained for him the title of 'The Father of the County.'

Montgomery died at Stobo on 2 April 1803 and is buried in Stobo churchyard.

== Family ==
Montgomery married Margaret Scot, daughter and heiress of Robert Scot of Killearn, Stirlingshire. They had four sons, and three daughters:

- Lt.-Col. William (d. Oct 1800)
- Margaret Montgomery (d. 1852) married Robert Campbell of Kailzie. They had no issue
- Sir James Montgomery, 2nd Baronet (9 Oct 1766 - 27 May 1839)
- Archibald Charles (25 June 1771 - 1845) married Maria Rausch. They had three sons, and two daughters.
- Robert (5 June 1775 - 2 December 1854) married Elizabeth Mason, daughter of a Bryant Mason, on 24 April 1817. They had four sons, and two daughters.
- Barbara Montgomery married Brig.-Gen. Alexander Walker.
- Anne Montgomery married Thomas Hart.

Montgomery was succeeded in his baronetcy by James, his second son, afterwards Lord Advocate, his first-born son, William, a lieutenant-colonel in the 43rd foot, having predeceased him.

Montgomery and his wife, Margaret Scott, are buried in a walled-off part of the cemetery at Stobo Kirk near Peebles, with an unusual wall lining of yew hedge. His home had been the nearby Stobo Castle, which he purchased in 1767 for the sum of £40,500.

Montgomery was grandfather to James Francis Montgomery.

== Sources ==
- Seymour, Camilla and Randall, John (2007). Stobo Kirk. A Guide to the Building and its History. Peebles : John Randall.
- Stobo Through Time

Legal offices
Preceded by Thomas Miller	Solicitor General for Scotland; 1760–1766; With: Francis Garden 1760–64	Succeeded by Henry Dundas
Parliament of Great Britain
Preceded by Thomas Miller	Member of Parliament for Dumfries Burghs; 1766–1768	Succeeded by Sir William Douglas, 4th Bt
Preceded by Adam Hay	Member of Parliament for Peeblesshire; 1768–1775	Succeeded by Adam Hay
Academic offices
Preceded by The Lord Cathcart	Rector of the University of Glasgow; 1775–1777	Succeeded by Andrew Stewart of Torrance
Baronetage of the United Kingdom
New creation	Baronet (of Stanhope); 1801–1803	Succeeded by James Montgomery
