= John Moore (1756–1834) =

Irish politician

John Moore (1756 – 21 May 1834) was an Irish politician.

Moore was the son of John Moore (1726–1809), of Drumbanagher, County Armagh, Member of Parliament for Ballynakill, great-grandson of Arthur Moore, younger son of Garret Moore, 1st Viscount Moore, ancestor of the Earls and Marquesses of Drogheda. His mother was Gertrude Baillie, daughter of Capt. Francis Baillie.

Moore was returned to the Irish House of Commons for Ballynakill in 1783 (succeeding his father-in-law), a seat he held until 1790, and then represented Lisburn until 1798 and Newry between 1799 and 1800. He continued to represent Newry in the British Parliament from 1801–02.

== Personal life/death ==
Moore married Mary Stewart, daughter of Sir Annesley Stewart, 6th Baronet, in 1781. They had no children. He died on 21 May 1834.

== See also ==
- Politics of Ireland

Parliament of Ireland
Preceded by Sir William Montgomery, Bt; Sir Annesley Stewart, Bt	Member of Parliament for Ballynakill; 1783–1790; With: Sir William Montgomery, Bt 1783–1789; John Egan 1789–1790	Succeeded by John Tydd; Eyre Coote
Preceded by William Sharman; William Jones	Member of Parliament for Lisburn; 1790–1798; With: George Hatton	Succeeded by George Hatton; Stewart Bruce
Preceded by Robert Ross; Isaac Corry	Member of Parliament for Newry; 1798–1800; With: Isaac Corry	Parliament of the United Kingdom
Parliament of the United Kingdom
New constituency	Member of Parliament for Newry; 1801–1802	Succeeded by Isaac Corry
