= Sir George Montgomery, 2nd Baronet =

British Army officer (1765–1831)

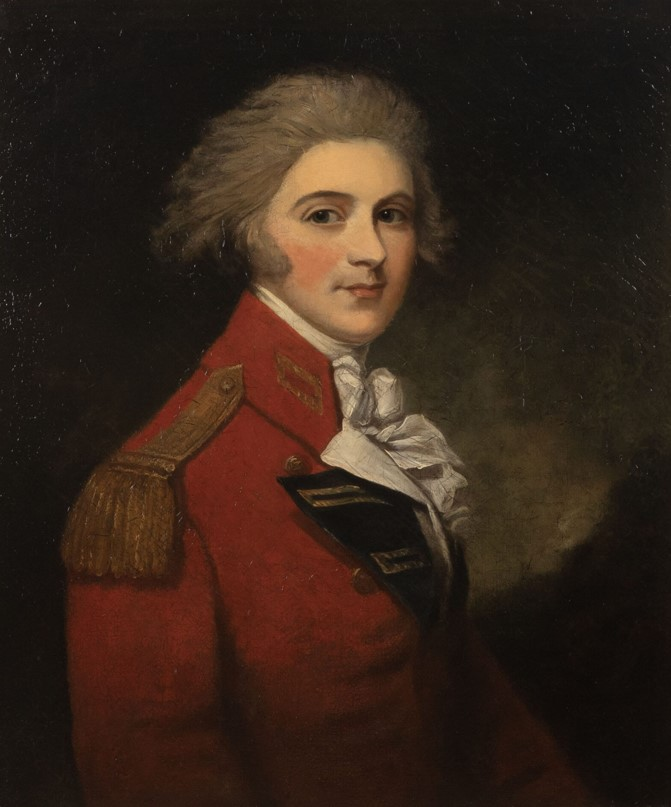
Captain Sir George Montgomery, Bt painted in 1789

Sir George Montgomery, 2nd Baronet (1765 – 10 July 1831) was a British Army officer and Tory politician of Scottish and Anglo-Irish descent.

== Biography ==
Montgomery was the son of Sir William Montgomery, 1st Baronet by his second wife, Anne Evatt. In 1778 he received a commission in the 68th Regiment of Foot. He was promoted to captain in 1783 and transferred to the 14th Dragoons in 1786. In 1788, Montgomery succeeded to his father's baronetcy, his elder half-brother, William, having predeceased the first baronet. He resigned from the army in 1790. Shortly afterwards he received the position of clerk of the head permit office in the Dublin Castle administration, worth £800 a year in income, from William Pitt the Younger's ministry. Montgomery continued to receive reimbursement for the office until 1812, when Lord Liverpool removed him from the compensation list. He appealed to the new Chief Secretary for Ireland, Robert Peel, who managed to pacify Montgomery by offering a compensatory pension.

Montgomery stood for election as the Member of Parliament for the Scottish constituency of Peeblesshire in the January 1831 by-election caused by the retirement of his cousin, Sir James Montgomery, 2nd Baronet. He won the election unopposed, promising to ‘promote the safety of the king and constitution’. He was again returned for the seat unopposed in the 1831 United Kingdom general election, but died on 10 July 1831 shortly after parliament had reconvened. He is not recorded as having spoken in any debates in the Commons.

He died having never married, at which point his title became extinct. Montgomery's property in Scotland and Ireland was divided according to his will, with the family house at Magbie Hill going to his nephew, John Isaac Beresford.

Parliament of the United Kingdom
| Preceded by Sir James Montgomery, Bt | Member of Parliament for Peeblesshire; 1831 | Succeeded by John Hay |
Baronetage of Great Britain
| Preceded by William Montgomery | Baronet (of Magbie Hill); 1788–1831 | Extinct |
