= Robert Christie Stewart =

Scottish landowner (1926–2019)

Colonel Sir Robert Christie Stewart KCVO CBE TD (1926 – 25 September 2019) was a Scottish landowner who had a military career in the British Army and was a Lord Lieutenant of two counties in Scotland. He was generally referred to in the community as R. C. Stewart.

== Early life ==
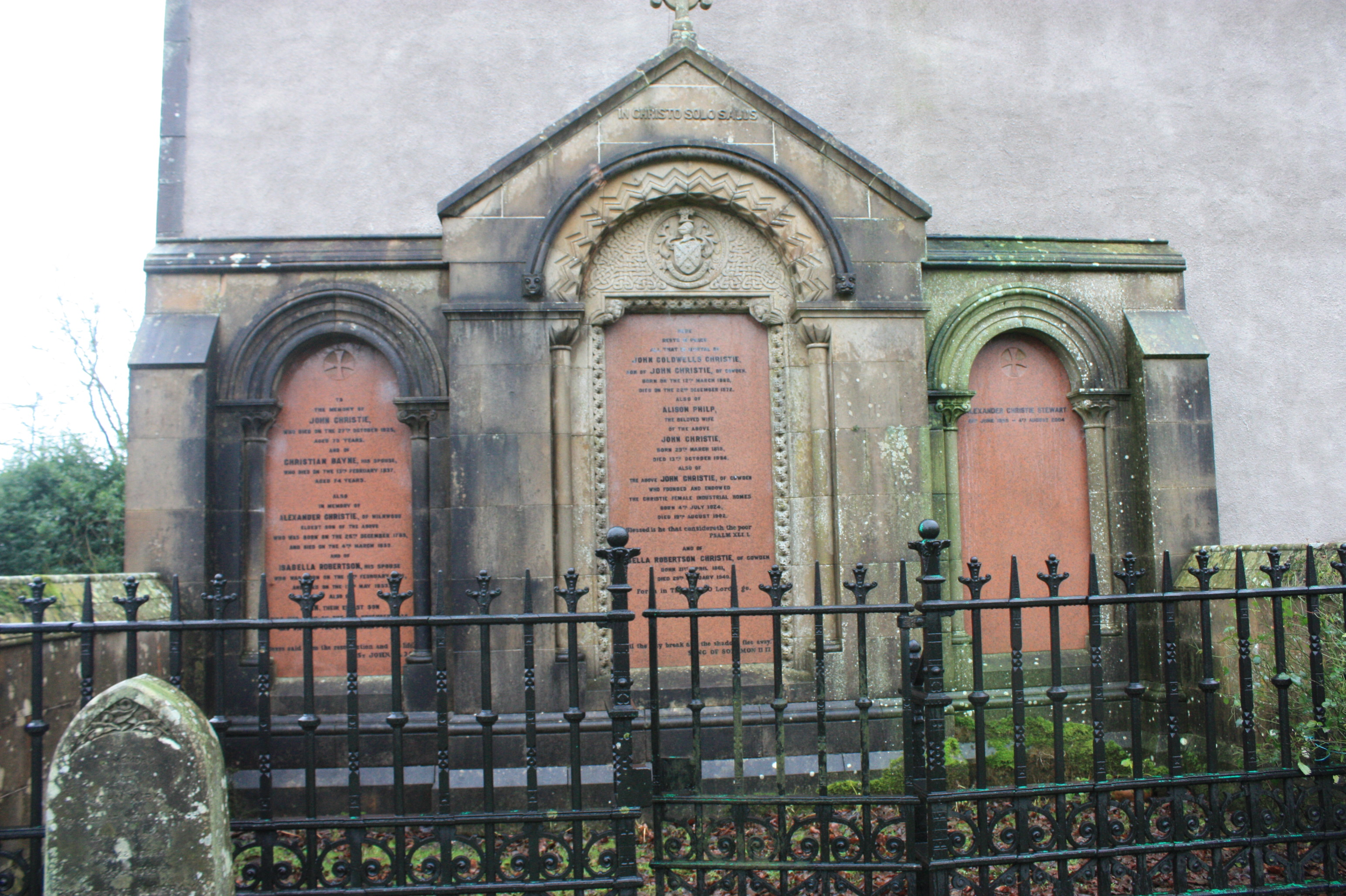
The Christie plot in Muckhart churchyard

Stewart was born on 3 August 1926. He was the son of Major Alexander Caldwell Stewart and Florence Hamilton Lighton. He was educated at Eton College and University College, Oxford, where he read Agriculture and Forest Science.

== Career ==
Stewart served in the Scots Guards. He was awarded the Territorial Decoration (TD). He was appointed Commander of the Order of the British Empire (CBE). He was appointed Knight Commander of the Royal Victorian Order (KCVO). He then returned to his family estate at Arndean near Blairingone in Scotland. Stewart held the office of Lord Lieutenant of Kinross-shire between 1966 and 1974. Later, he was Lord Lieutenant of Clackmannanshire during 1995–2001.

== Personal life ==
Stewart lived most of his life at the family home of Arndean, south of Dollar. He inherited the Cowden estate (between Dollar and Muckhart) from his aunt Alice Christie in the 1950s.

Upon the death of his uncle, Captain John Christie Stewart, in 1978, Stewart inherited the estate of Murdostoun, in Lanarkshire, which was sold a year later.

Stewart married Ann Grizel Cochrane, daughter of Air Chief Marshal Hon. Sir Ralph Alexander Cochrane and Hilda Frances Holme Wiggin, on 21 May 1953. They had two children together.

== Death ==
Stewart died on 25 September 2019, aged 93. He is buried in the Christie plot on the east side of Muckhart church.
