= Charles Adam =

Royal Navy Admiral (1780–1853)

Sir Charles Adam KCB FRSE
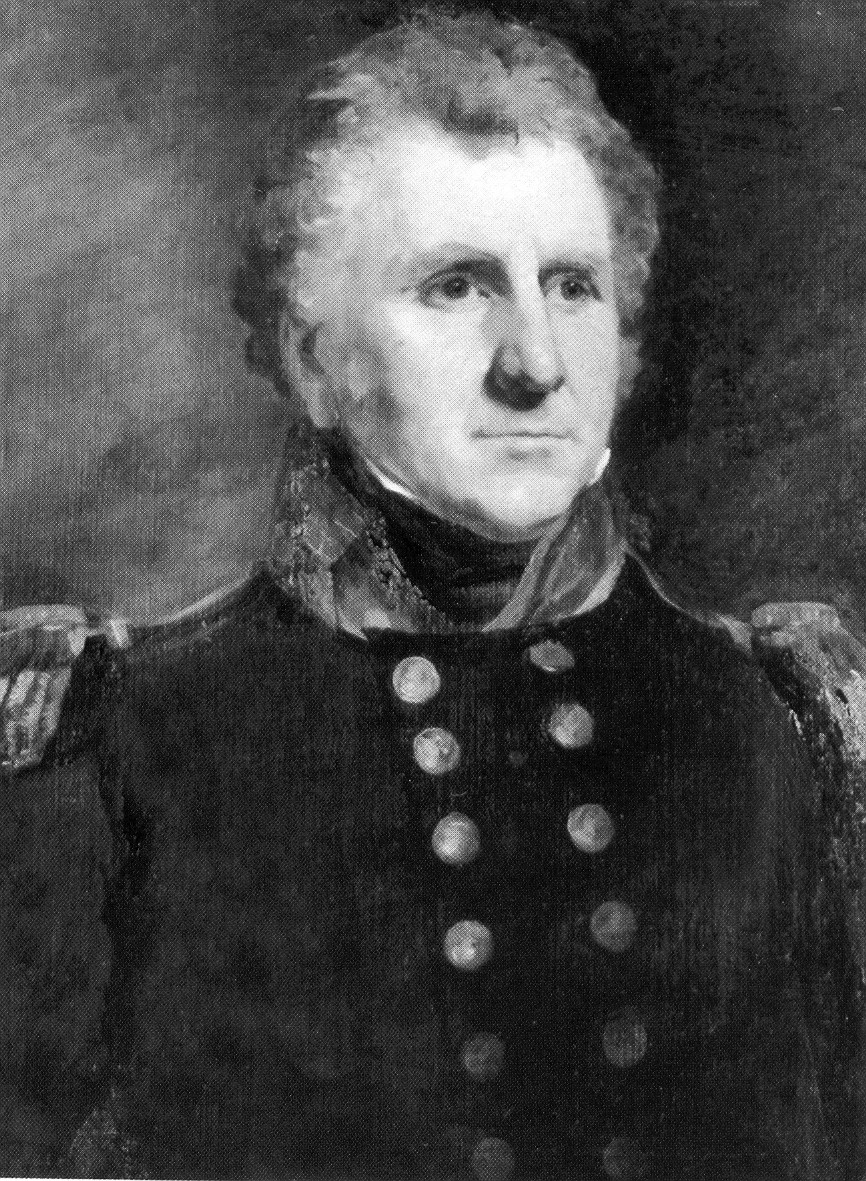
- Admiral Sir Charles Adam
- Born: 6 October 1780
- Died: 19 September 1853 (aged 72); Greenwich, London
- Military career
- Allegiance: Great Britain; United Kingdom
- Branch: Royal Navy
- Service years: 1790–1847
- Rank: Admiral of the Blue
- Commands: Sybille; Chiffonne; Resistance; Invincible; Impregnable; Royal Sovereign; North America and West Indies Station; Greenwich Hospital
- Conflicts: French Revolutionary and Napoleonic Wars
- Awards: Knight Commander of the Order of the Bath

Admiral Sir Charles Adam KCB FRSE (6 October 1780 – 19 September 1853) was a Royal Navy officer and politician who served in the French Revolutionary and Napoleonic Wars. He later commanded the royal yacht, Royal Sovereign, and was the Member of Parliament for Clackmannanshire and Kinross-shire.

Adam served as Commander-in-Chief, North America and West Indies Station. He also held the office of First Naval Lord three times. In that capacity he dealt ably with the economies of a peacetime budget, provided naval support for the expulsion of Muhammad Ali's forces from Syria in 1840 and ensured technological progress continued. He was also the father of William Patrick Adam, a colonial administrator and Liberal politician. Later in life, he was Governor, Greenwich Hospital.

== Naval career ==
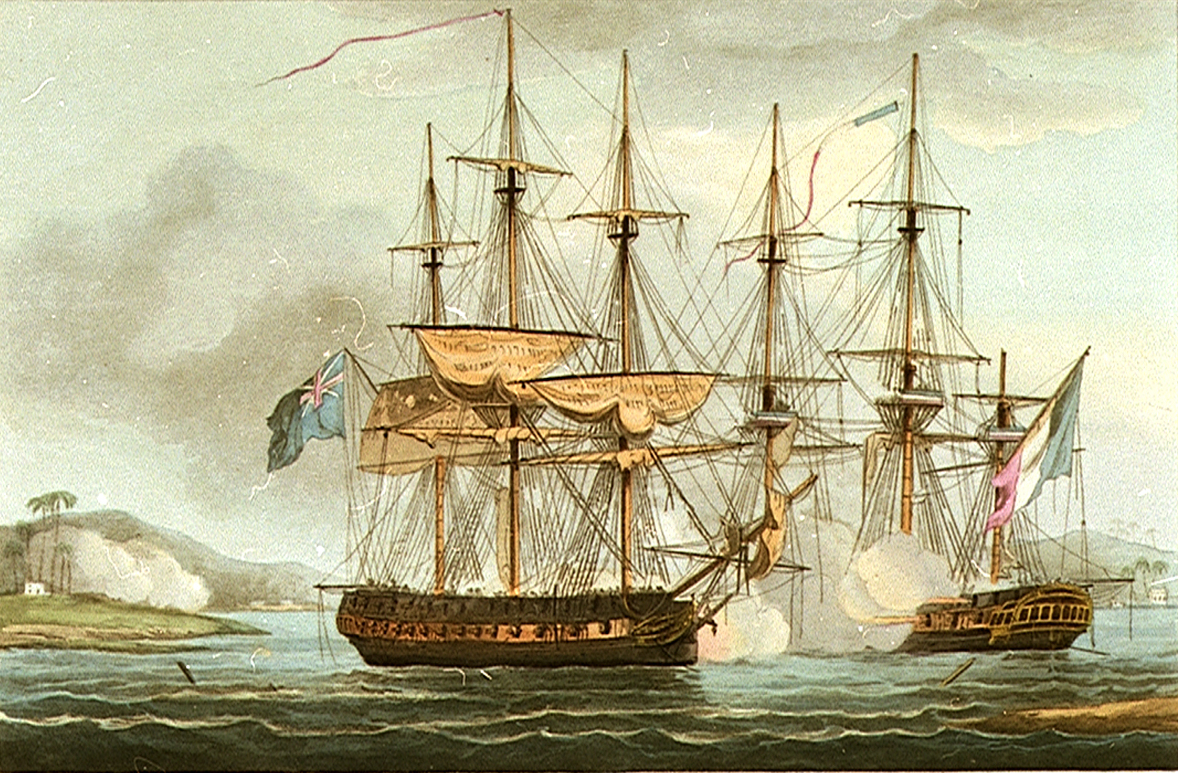
The frigate Sybille which Adam commanded

Born at Blairadam House just north of Kelty in Fife he was the second son of William Adam (of Blair Adam) and Eleanora Adam (the daughter of Charles Elphinstone, 10th Lord Elphinstone), Adam joined the Royal Navy in 1790. He served under his maternal uncle, Admiral Lord Keith, in the Mediterranean Fleet and during the capture of the Cape of Good Hope from the Dutch. He was made acting lieutenant by Keith in the third-rate HMS Victorious on the East Indies Station in 1795. Promoted to the substantive rank of lieutenant on 8 February 1798, to commander on 16 May 1798 and to captain on 12 June 1799, Adam was given command of the frigate Sybille. While commanding Sybille, he captured the French Chiffonne under difficult circumstances at Mahé in the Seychelles.

Adam returned from the East Indies in 1802, and on 23 May 1803, was given command of the captured Chiffonne, which operated in the North Sea under Lord Keith until 1805. He commanded the fifth-rate Resistance from 27 August 1805 until 6 April 1810, and from 1811 until 1813, operated off the coast of Spain in command of the third-rate Invincible. He briefly commanded the second-rate Impregnable from 16 May 1814 to 29 June 1814, ending his active service.

== Administrative career ==
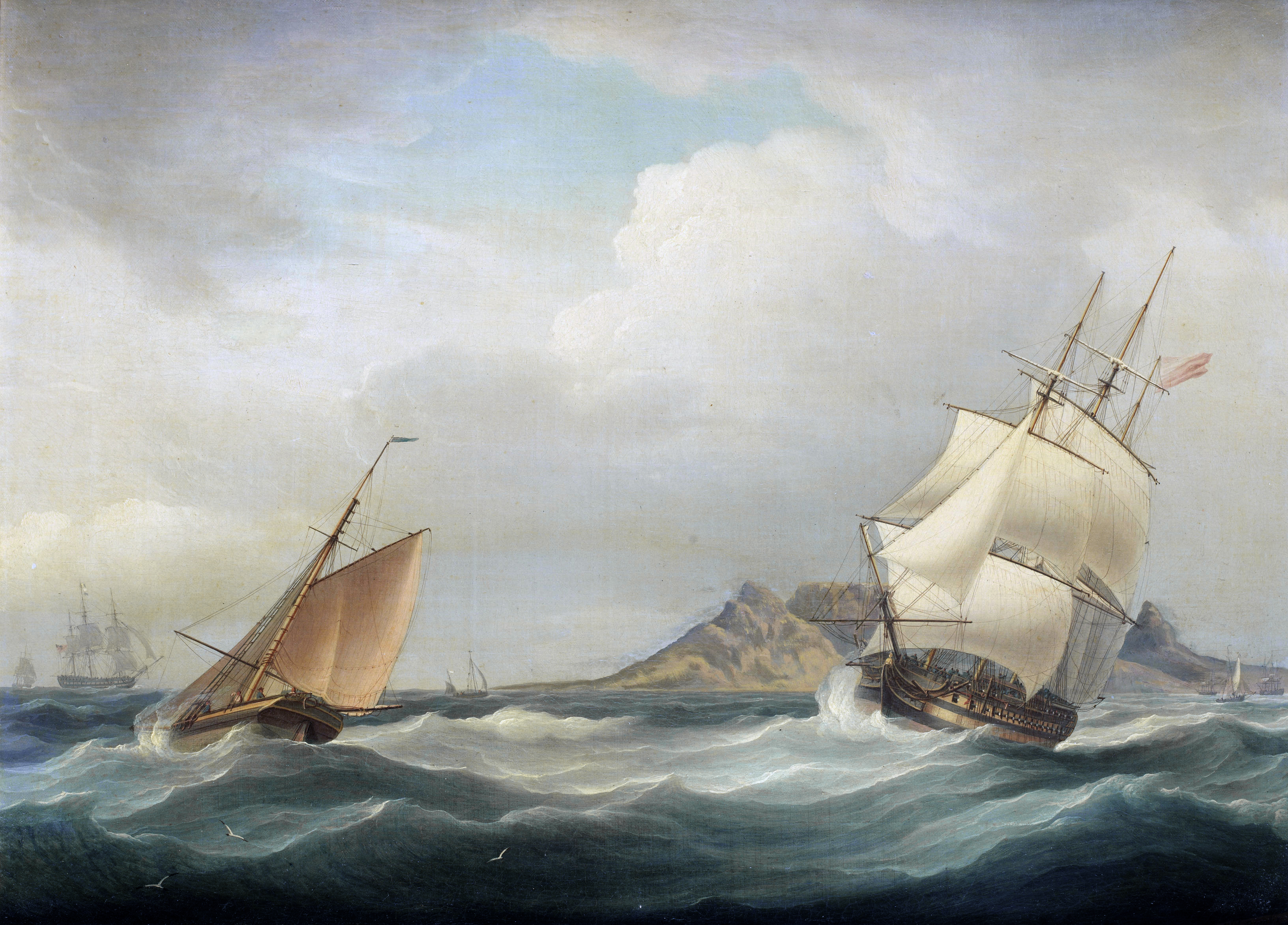
HMS Illustrious, Adam's flagship as commander-in-chief of the North America and West Indies Station

After the war, Adam twice commanded the royal yacht, Royal Sovereign, from 15 December 1814 until 7 February 1816 as acting captain and from 20 July 1821 to 25 May 1825 as captain. This appointment reflected the political influence of his father. During this period, in 1822, he married Elizabeth Brydone, by whom he had several children, including William Patrick Adam. In 1824 he was elected a Fellow of the Royal Society of Edinburgh.

Adam was promoted rear admiral on 27 May 1825. In the 1831 General election he was elected Member of Parliament for the alternating constituency of Kinross-shire which had previously been held by several members of his family. After the Reform Act 1832 (2 & 3 Will. 4. c. 45) he was elected for the combined Clackmannanshire and Kinross-shire, which he held until 1841. He briefly served as First Naval Lord in the Wellington caretaker ministry from 1 November 1834 to 23 December 1834. He was appointed a Knight Commander of the Order of the Bath on 10 January 1835 and was again appointed First Naval Lord, this time in the Second Melbourne ministry, on 25 April 1835. He also became Lord Lieutenant and Sheriff Principal of Kinross on 1 April 1839.

Adam was a friend of Lord Auckland and brother-in-law to Lord Minto, both of whom served as First Lord of the Admiralty during his time in office, fostering a close working relationship. He was also on good terms with Lord Palmerston, the Foreign Secretary.

During his tenure, the Admiralty Board dealt ably with the economies of a peacetime budget, which his Whig loyalties prevented him from questioning. The one major naval campaign of the era was the expulsion of Muhammad Ali's forces from Syria in 1840, an able demonstration of the continued strength of the Royal Navy. During this time, technological progress continued at the Admiralty, with the decision to adapt Francis Pettit Smith's screw propeller, and the new battleship designs of Sir William Symonds in 1841. During his tenure on the Board, Adam was promoted to vice admiral on 10 January 1837.

After leaving the Board, Adam resumed a naval command. From 17 August 1841 until 27 December 1844, he was commander-in-chief of the North America and West Indies Station, aboard HMS Illustrious (flag-captain John Erskine). On 24 July 1846, soon after the reappointment of Lord Auckland as First Lord of the Admiralty, he became First Naval Lord (in the First Russell ministry) for the third and last time. He retired the next year, on 20 July 1847, to become Governor of Greenwich Hospital, and was promoted admiral on 8 January 1848.

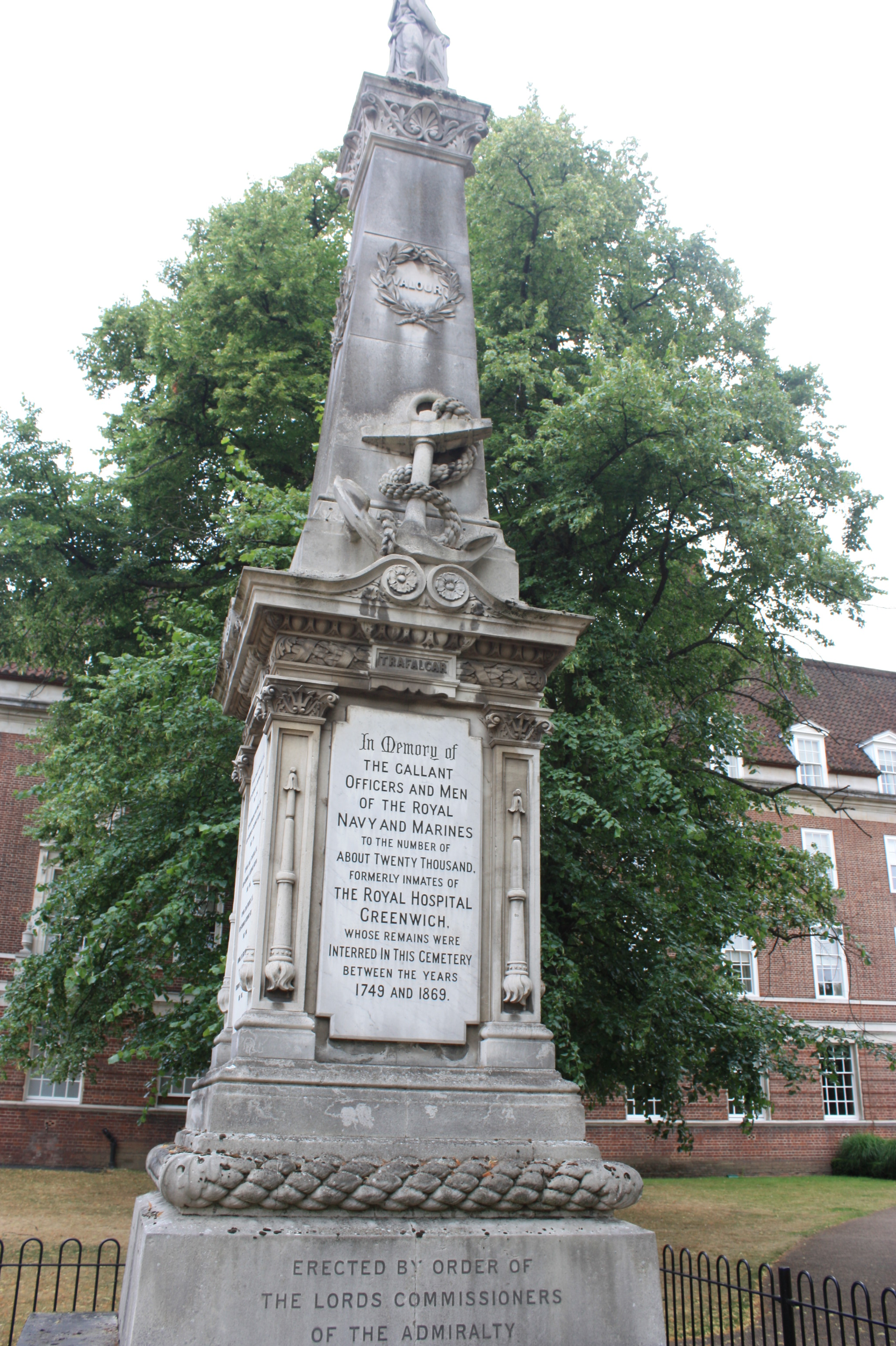
The Officers Monument, Greenwich Hospital Cemetery

Adam died at Greenwich on 16 September 1853. He was buried in Greenwich Hospital Cemetery. The cemetery was largely cleared in the late 19th century to create a pocket park but his name is listed on the west face of the Officers Monument in the centre of the park. Adam Bay, Northern Territory, at the mouth of the Adelaide River, was named for him.

Parliament of the United Kingdom
Vacant alternating constituency Title last held by George Edward Graham	Member of Parliament for Kinross-shire; 1831–1832	constituency abolished
New constituency	Member of Parliament for Clackmannanshire and Kinross-shire; 1832–1841	Succeeded by George Abercromby
Military offices
Preceded by George Dundas	First Naval Lord; 1834	Succeeded by Sir George Cockburn
Preceded by Sir George Cockburn	First Naval Lord; 1835–1841	Succeeded by Sir George Cockburn
Preceded by Sir Thomas Harvey	Commander-in-Chief, North America and West Indies Station; 1841–1844	Succeeded by Sir Francis Austen
Preceded by Sir William Parker, Bt	First Naval Lord; 1846–1847	Succeeded by Sir James Dundas
Preceded by Sir Robert Stopford	Governor, Greenwich Hospital; 1847–1853	Succeeded by Sir James Gordon
Honorary titles
Preceded by William Adam	Lord Lieutenant of Kinross-shire; 1839–1853	Succeeded by Sir Graham Graham-Montgomery
