= Sir James Montgomery, 2nd Baronet =

Scottish politician and lawyer (1766–1839)

James Montgomery FRSE
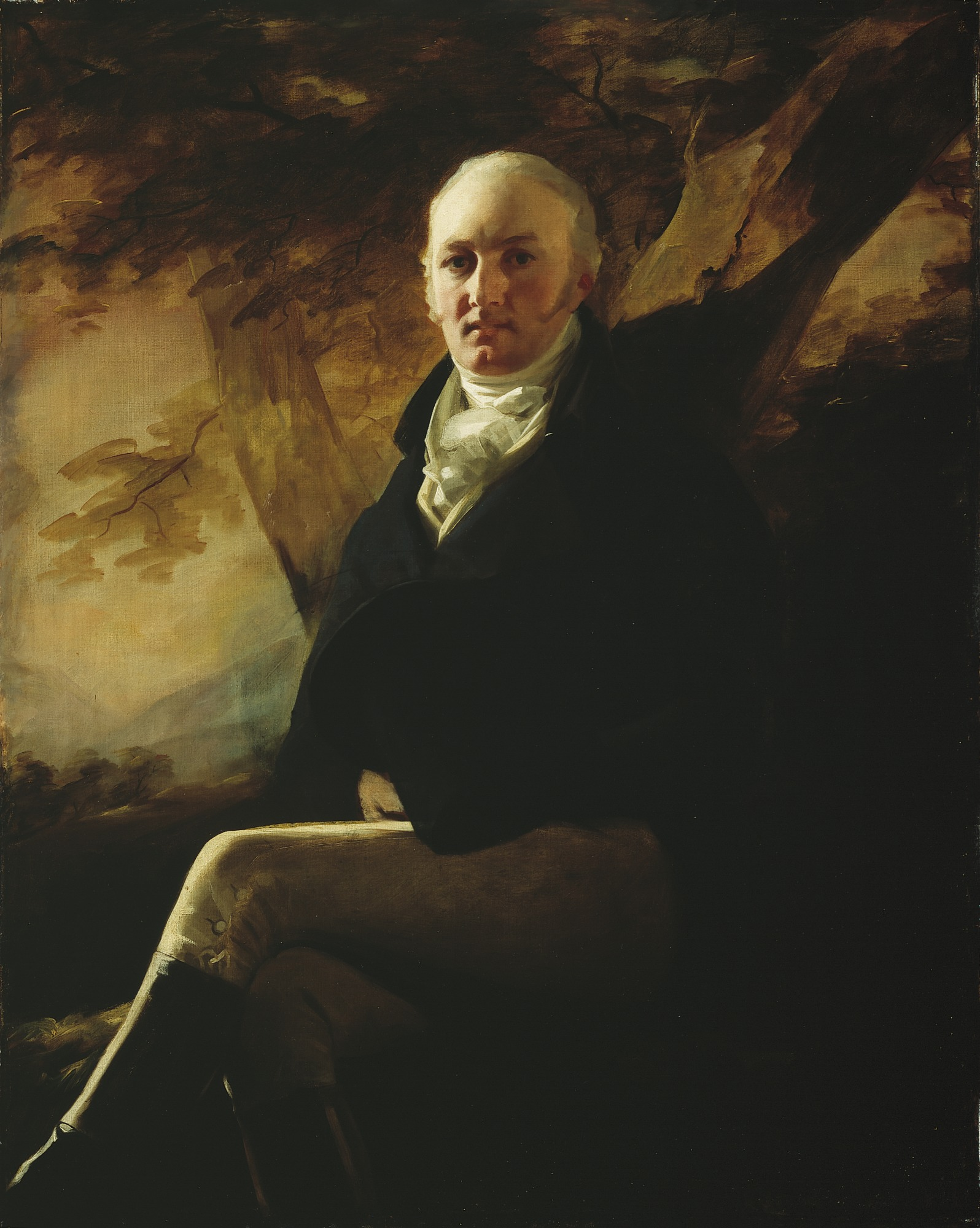
- portrait by Henry Raeburn

2nd Baronet Stanhope
- In office 1803–1839
- Succeeded by: Graham Graham-Montgomery

Member of the British Parliament for Peeblesshire
- In office 1800–1831

Lord Advocate of Scotland
- In office 1804–1806

Personal details
- Born: 9 October 1766 Peeblesshire, Scotland
- Died: 27 May 1839 (aged 72)
- Spouses: Elizabeth Douglas; Helen Graham
- Children: 8
- Parents: Sir James Montgomery, 1st Baronet Stanhope (father); Margaret Scott (mother)
- Occupation: lawyer

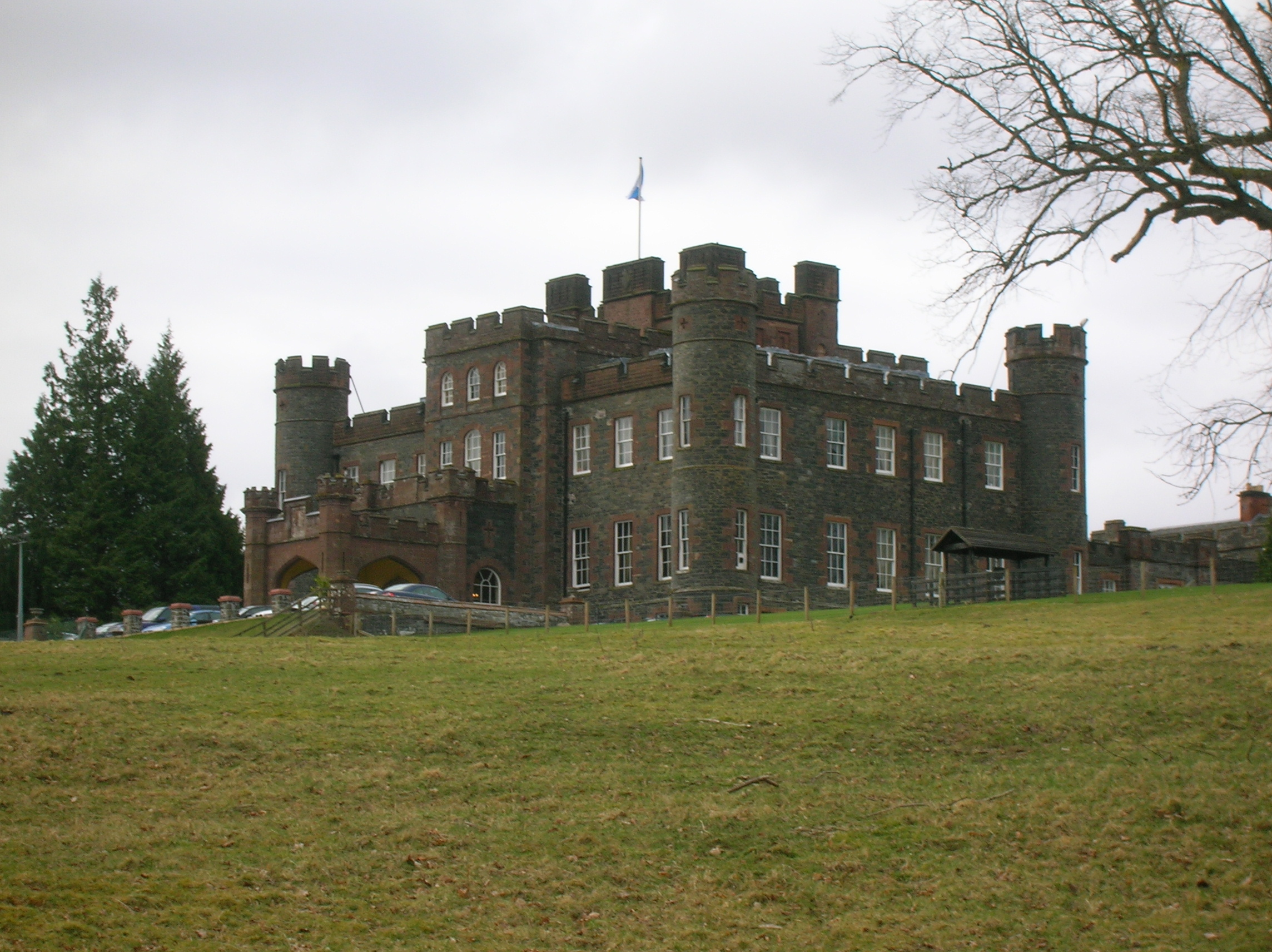
Stobo Castle, Scottish Borders

Sir James Montgomery, 2nd Baronet Stanhope, FRSE (9 October 1766 – 27 May 1839) was a Scottish politician and lawyer who served as Lord Advocate of Scotland 1804 to 1806.

== Life ==
James Montgomery was born in Peeblesshire on 9 October 1766, the son of Sir James Montgomery, 1st Baronet Stanhope and Margaret Scott. The family moved to Stobo Castle when he was an infant. He was educated at the High School in Edinburgh from 1773 to 1778. He trained as an advocate passing the bar in 1787. He worked as an advocate at Argyll Square in Edinburgh through the 1790s.

He succeeded to the baronetcy on the death of his father in 1803. He immediately set about remodelling Stobo Castle, commissioning the Edinburgh architect Archibald Elliot to rebuild it in a castellated style. The very large project was completed in 1811 and brought the castle to its current appearance.

In 1810 he inherited £20,000 on the death of the family friend, William Douglas, 4th Duke of Queensberry, who had died childless. This was a true fortune at that time.

From 1817 he served as Deputy Governor of the British Linen Company Bank.

He held the office of Member of Parliament (M.P.) for Peeblesshire between 1800 and 1831. His maiden speech as an MP was on the prevention of forgery of bank-notes. In 1807 he was elected a Fellow of the Royal Society of Edinburgh. His proposers were Sir James Hall, Alexander Dirom, and Thomas Charles Hope.

In later life he had a town house at 20 York Place, Edinburgh.

He died on 27 May 1839 aged 72.

== Family ==
He married, firstly, Lady Elizabeth Douglas (d.1814), daughter of Dunbar Douglas, 4th Earl of Selkirk and Helen Hamilton, on 1 August 1806. His brother-in-law during this marriage was Basil William Douglas. They had two daughters and one son:

- Helen Anne Montgomery (d. 1870) married William Forbes Mackenzie MP. They had two children.
- Elizabeth Montgomery (d. 15 Sep 1874)
- James Montgomery (28 Apr 1811 - 16 July 1833)

He married, secondly, Helen Graham (d.1828), daughter of Thomas Graham MP of Kinross House, in 1816. They had two daughters and three sons:

- Anne Montgomery (30 June 1835). Unmarried.
- Margaret Fleming Montgomery (d. 28 Feb 1840). Unmarried.
- Sir Graham Graham-Montgomery, 3rd Baronet (9 July 1823 - 2 June 1901)
- John Basil Hamilton Montgomery (11 Sep 1824 - 22 Feb 1911). Unmarried.
- Capt. Thomas Henry Montgomery (21 Aug 1828 - 20 Jan 1879) married Hon. Anna Maria Elphinstone, daughter of Lt.-Col. James Drummond Buller-Fullerton-Elphinstone (a grandson of Charles Elphinstone, 10th Lord Elphinstone). They had two sons, and one daughter, including Sir Henry James Purvis-Russell-Hamilton-Montgomery, 7th Baronet.

Parliament of Great Britain
Preceded by William Montgomery his elder brother	Member of Parliament for Peeblesshire; 1800 – 1800	Succeeded by Parliament of the United Kingdom
Parliament of the United Kingdom
Preceded by Parliament of Great Britain	Member of Parliament for Peeblesshire; 1801 – 1831	Succeeded by Sir George Montgomery, 2nd Bt
Legal offices
Preceded by Charles Hope, Lord Granton	Lord Advocate; 1804–1806	Succeeded by The Hon. Henry Erskine
Peerage of the United Kingdom
Preceded by James Montgomery	Baronet (of Stanhope); 1803–1839	Succeeded by Graham Graham-Montgomery
