= Graham Graham-Montgomery =

Scottish baronet

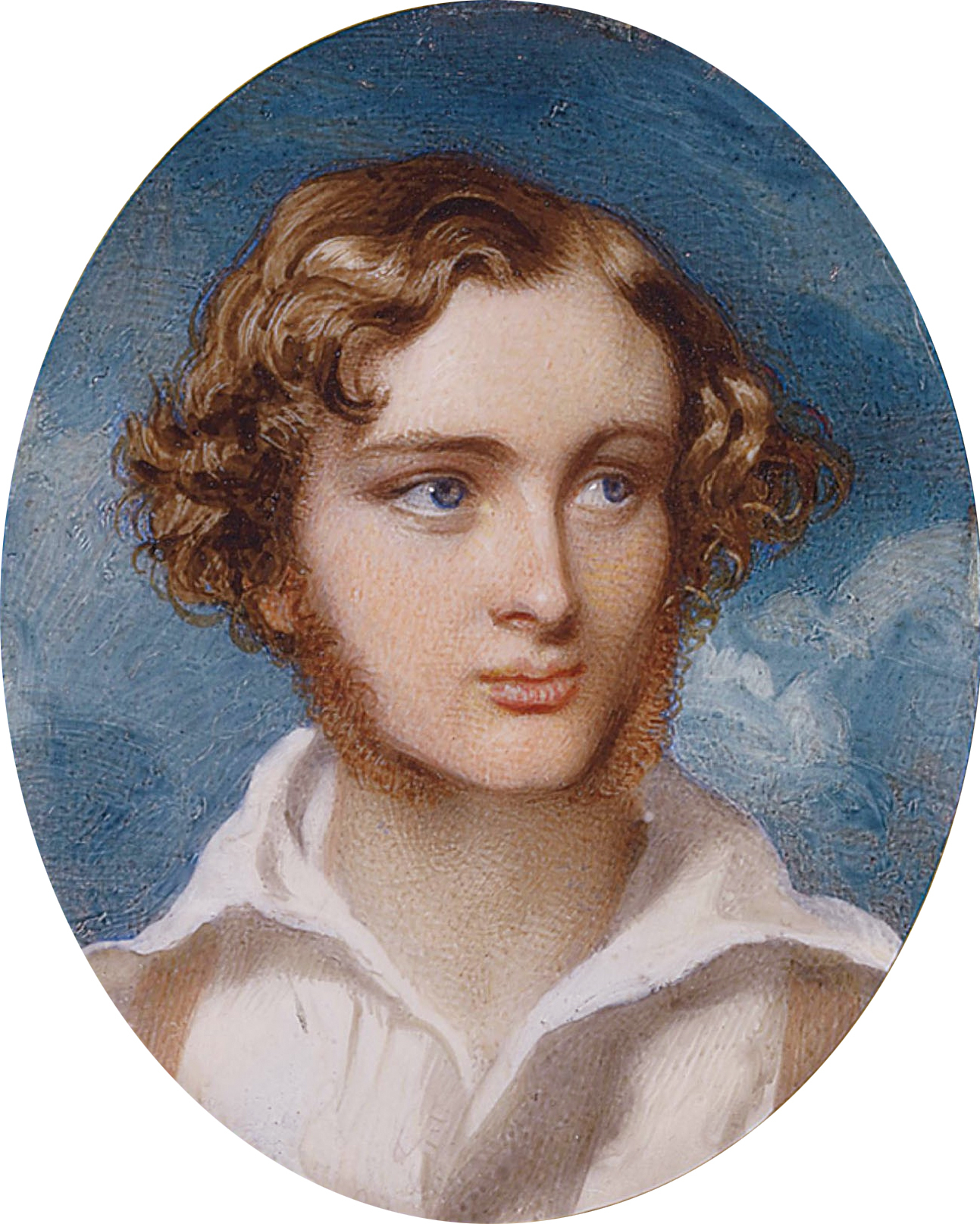
Miniature by Robert Thorburn

Sir Graham Graham-Montgomery, 3rd Baronet, DL (9 July 1823 – 2 June 1901) was a Scottish baronet and member of the British House of Commons.

== Life ==
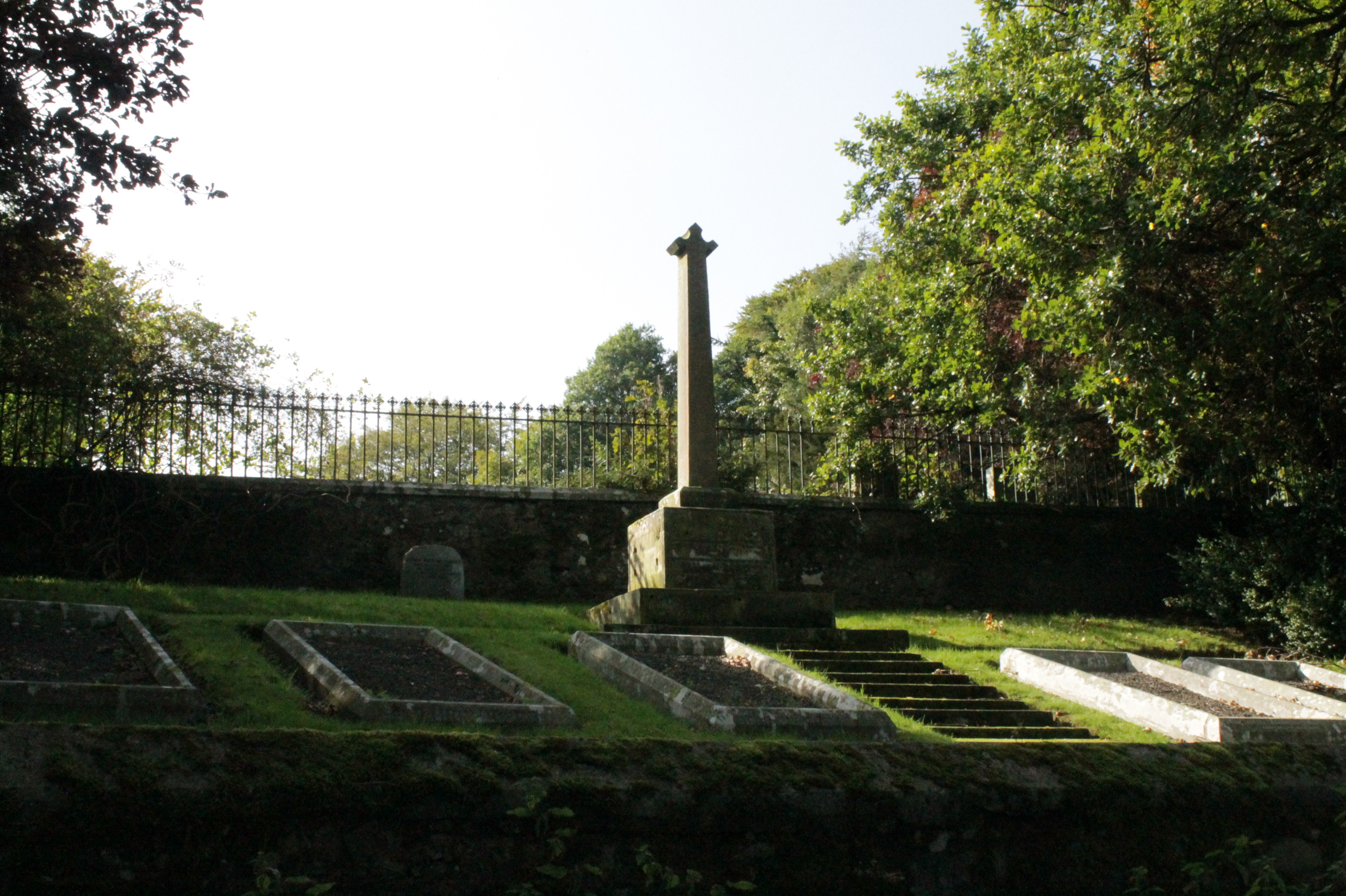
Gravesite

Graham-Montgomery entered the House of Commons in 1852 as a member for Peeblesshire, and held the seat until 1868, when it was united with that of Selkirk. He was returned for the newly unified constituency, and held it through 1880.

In 1885 his daughter Alice married Richard Temple-Nugent-Brydges-Chandos-Grenville, 3rd Duke of Buckingham and Chandos but she had no children.

He was a junior Lord of the Treasury from 1866 until 1868. He was also Lord Lieutenant of Kinross-shire from 1854 until his death in 1901.

He lived in Kinross House and is buried east of the house on the edge of Loch Leven. His family lie with him.

Parliament of the United Kingdom
Preceded by William Forbes Mackenzie	Member of Parliament for Peeblesshire; 1852–1868	Succeeded by United with Selkirk
Preceded by None	Member of Parliament for Peebles and Selkirk; 1868–1880	Succeeded by Charles Tennant
Honorary titles
Preceded by Sir Charles Adam	Lord Lieutenant of Kinross-shire; 1854–1901	Succeeded by The Lord Moncreiff
Peerage of the United Kingdom
Preceded by James Montgomery	Baronet (of Stanhope); 1839–1901	Succeeded by James Graham-Montgomery
