= Peeblesshire (UK Parliament constituency) =

Parliamentary constituency in the United Kingdom, 1801–1868

- Former county constituency for the House of Commons
- Subdivision: Peeblesshire

1708–1868
- Seats: One
- Replaced by: Peebles & Selkirk

Peeblesshire was a Scottish county constituency of the House of Commons of Great Britain from 1708 and after 1801 the House of Commons of the Parliament of the United Kingdom (Westminster) until 1868. It elected one Member of Parliament (MP) by the first past the post voting system.

== Creation ==
The British parliamentary constituency was created in 1708 following the Acts of Union, 1707 and replaced the former Parliament of Scotland shire constituency of Peeblesshire.

== Boundaries ==
The name relates the constituency to the county of Peebles. Article XII of the Union with Scotland Act 1706 (Act settling the Manner of electing the Representatives of Scotland), provided that one representative should be chosen for every shire and steuartry (except for some shires which were to take turns).

== History ==
The constituency elected one Member of Parliament (MP) by the first past the post system until the seat was abolished for the 1868 general election.

This arrangement was continued by the Representation of the People (Scotland) Act 1832.

The Representation of the People (Scotland) Act 1868 abolished the rights of the counties of Peebles and Selkirk to return a member, and provided that those counties should jointly return a member, thereby establishing the Peebles and Selkirk constituency.

== Members of Parliament ==
Election	Member	Party
1708	William Morison	
1710	Alexander Murray, later 3rd Baronet	
1713	William Morison	
1715	Alexander Murray	(c. 1686–1755)
1722	John Douglas	
1732 by-election	Sir James Naesmyth, 2nd Baronet	
1741	Alexander Murray	(c. 1686–1755)
1747	John Dickson	
1767 by-election	Adam Hay	
1768	James William Montgomery	
June 1775 by-election	Adam Hay	
December 1775 by-election	Sir Robert Murray-Keith	
1780	Alexander Murray	
1783 by-election	Alexander Murray, later 7th Lord Elibank	
1784	David Murray	
1790	William Montgomery	
1800 by-election	Sir James Montgomery, 2nd Bt	Tory
1831 by-election	Sir George Montgomery, 2nd Bt	Tory
1831	John Hay	Tory
1834	John Hay	Conservative
1837	William Forbes Mackenzie	Conservative
1852	Graham Graham-Montgomery	Conservative
1868	Constituency abolished. See Peebles and Selkirk	

== Election results ==
=== Elections in the 1830s ===
General election 1830: Peeblesshire
Party	Candidate	Votes	%
Tory	James Montgomery	Unopposed	
Registered electors		48	
Tory hold			

Montgomery resigned, causing a by-election.

By-election, 4 March 1831: Peeblesshire
Party	Candidate	Votes	%
Tory	Sir George Montgomery, 2nd Baronet	Unopposed	
Registered electors		48	
Tory hold			

General election 1831: Peeblesshire
Party	Candidate	Votes	%
Tory	Sir George Montgomery, 2nd Baronet	Unopposed	
Registered electors		48	
Tory hold			

Montgomery's death caused a by-election.

By-election, 9 August 1831: Peeblesshire
Party	Candidate	Votes	%
Tory	John Hay	Unopposed	
Registered electors		48	
Tory hold			

General election 1832: Peeblesshire
Party	Candidate	Votes	%
Tory	John Hay	Unopposed	
Registered electors		307	
Tory hold			

General election 1835: Peeblesshire
Party	Candidate	Votes	%
Conservative	John Hay	Unopposed	
Registered electors		354	
Conservative hold			

General election 1837: Peeblesshire
Party	Candidate	Votes	%
Conservative	William Forbes Mackenzie	251	50.6
Whig	Sir Alexander Gibson-Carmichael, 8th Baronet	245	49.4
Majority		6	1.2
Turnout		496	71.9
Registered electors		690	
Conservative hold			

=== Elections in the 1840s ===
General election 1841: Peeblesshire
Party	Candidate	Votes	%	±%
Conservative	William Forbes Mackenzie	Unopposed		
Registered electors		863		
Conservative hold				

Mackenzie was appointed a Lord Commissioner of the Treasury, requiring a by-election.

By-election, 5 May 1845: Peeblesshire
Party	Candidate	Votes	%	±%
Conservative	William Forbes Mackenzie	Unopposed		
Conservative hold				

General election 1847: Peeblesshire
Party	Candidate	Votes	%	±%
Conservative	William Forbes Mackenzie	240	59.6	N/A
Whig	Sir Alexander Gibson-Carmichael, 8th Baronet	163	40.4	New
Majority		77	19.2	N/A
Turnout		403	56.1	N/A
Registered electors		718		
Conservative hold		Swing	N/A	

=== Elections in the 1850s ===
General election 1852: Peeblesshire
Party	Candidate	Votes	%	±%
Conservative	Graham Graham-Montgomery	Unopposed		
Registered electors		542		
Conservative hold				

General election 1857: Peeblesshire
Party	Candidate	Votes	%	±%
Conservative	Graham Graham-Montgomery	Unopposed		
Registered electors		394		
Conservative hold				

General election 1859: Peeblesshire
Party	Candidate	Votes	%	±%
Conservative	Graham Graham-Montgomery	Unopposed		
Registered electors		407		
Conservative hold				

=== Elections in the 1860s ===
General election 1865: Peeblesshire
Party	Candidate	Votes	%	±%
Conservative	Graham Graham-Montgomery	Unopposed		
Registered electors		499		
Conservative hold				

Graham-Montgomery was appointed a Lord Commissioner of the Treasury, requiring a by-election.

By-election, 24 July 1866: Peeblesshire
Party	Candidate	Votes	%	±%
Conservative	Graham Graham-Montgomery	Unopposed		
Conservative hold				
