= William Forbes Mackenzie =

Scottish politician

William Forbes Mackenzie (18 April 1807 – 24 September 1862) was a Scottish Conservative politician and temperance reformer. He is best known for the Forbes MacKenzie Act, legislation passed in 1853 to regulate public houses in Scotland.

== Life ==
Born in Exmouth, Devon, he was the third son of Colin MacKenzie, writer to the signet in Edinburgh and his wife, Elizabeth, daughter of Sir William Forbes of Pitsligo. He studied for the law, and was called to the bar in 1827. In 1830, he married Helen Anne Montgomery, daughter of Sir James Montgomery, and they had two children. In 1831, he was appointed a deputy lieutenant of Peeblesshire.

At the 1837 general election he was elected to the House of Commons as Member of Parliament for Peeblesshire. He was re-elected as member for the constituency in 1841 and 1847. He was one of Sir Robert Peel's junior Lords of the Treasury from 26 April 1845 until the end of the latter's second premiership. He was an advocate of Catholic and Jewish emancipation and supported the administration's increase of the grant to Maynooth College. However, in May 1845, he threatened to resign from office as he felt that the Jewish Disabilities Reform Bill did not carry reforms far enough. He finally resigned from the government on 11 April 1846 over the Corn Laws, an issue which quickly led to the collapse of the administration.

In 1852, he was elected one of two Conservative members of parliament for Liverpool. He served as Parliamentary Secretary to the Treasury in Lord Derby's protectionist government from February 1852 to January 1853. In April 1853, he introduced the Public Houses (Scotland) Bill to the Commons. The Bill, which was eventually enacted as the Licensing (Scotland) Act 1853 (16 & 17 Vict. c.67), forced the closure of pubs in Scotland on Sundays and at 10pm on weekdays. Because of his active involvement in promoting it, the legislation was popularly known as the "Forbes Mackenzie Act".

In the meantime, he had been forced out of parliament. The two defeated Liberal candidates at Liverpool had issued an election petition contesting the results. In the ensuing court proceedings the Conservative election agents were found to have been guilty of bribery and treating. On 21 June 1853 the election was declared void.

Forbes MacKenzie made an attempt to re-enter parliament at Derby in 1857, but failed to be elected. In 1859 he was made chairman of the Commissioners in Lunacy for Scotland.

He died suddenly in September 1862, aged 55, while visiting Sir Charles Tennant at Glen House, Innerleithen, Peeblesshire.

== Sources ==
- Blake, Robert (1966). Disraeli. New York: St. Martin's Press. ISBN 0-19-832903-2.
- Lee, Sidney, ed. (1893). "Mackenzie, William Forbes" . Dictionary of National Biography. Vol. 35. London: Smith, Elder & Co.

Parliament of the United Kingdom
Preceded by Sir John Hay, Bt	Member of Parliament for Peeblesshire; 1837 – 1852	Succeeded by Sir Graham Graham-Montgomery, Bt
Preceded by Edward Cardwell; Sir Thomas Birch, Bt	Member of Parliament for Liverpool; 1852 – 1853; With: Charles Turner	Succeeded by Thomas Horsfall; Henry Liddell
Political offices
Preceded by William Hayter	Parliamentary Secretary to the Treasury; 1852	Succeeded by William Hayter
