= Ballynakill (Parliament of Ireland constituency) =

Pre-1801 Irish constituency

- Former borough constituency for the Irish House of Commons
- County: Queen's County
- Borough: Ballinakill

1613–1801
- Replaced by: Disfranchised

Ballynakill was a constituency represented in the Irish House of Commons until 1800. The town is now spelled Ballinakill.

== History ==
In the Patriot Parliament of 1689 summoned by James II, Ballynakill was not represented.

== Members of Parliament, 1613–1801 ==
Election	First MP	Second MP
1613	Sir Thomas Ridgeway	Arthur Brereton
1639	William Wandesford (died and replaced 1640 by Richard Fanshaw. Fanshaw replaced 1642 by Sir William Flower)	William Alford (replaced 1641 by Barnaby Dempsey. Dempsey replaced 1642 by Thomas Leigh)
1661	Thomas Keating	Sir Amos Meredith
1689	Sir Gregory Byrne, 1st Bt	Oliver Grace
1692	John Barrington	Daniel Weaver
1695	Sir Edward Massey	Walter Weldon
1703	John Barrington	Sir Arthur Gore, 2nd Bt
1713	John Barrington	Thomas Medlycott
1715	Samuel Freeman	John Weaver
1727	John Barrington	Richard Warburton
1747	John Barrington	Jonah Barrington
1756	Marcus Paterson	Jonah Barrington
1761	Marcus Paterson	Charles O'Hara
1768	William Montgomery (Note: Created a baronet in 1774)	John Moore
1776	William Montgomery	William Henry Burton (Note: Also elected for County Carlow in 1776, for which he chose to sit)
1777	William Montgomery	John Moore
October 1783	William Montgomery	Sir Annesley Stewart, 6th Bt (Note: Also elected for Charlemont in 1783, for which he chose to sit)
1783	William Montgomery	John Moore
1789	John Egan	John Moore
1790	John Tydd	Eyre Coote
1798	Montagu James Mathew	John Longfield
1800	David Walshe	John Longfield
March 1800	Francis Trench	John Longfield
1801	Disenfranchised	

== Bibliography ==
- O'Hart, John (2007). The Irish and Anglo-Irish Landed Gentry: When Cromwell came to Ireland. Vol. II. Heritage Books. ISBN 0-7884-1927-7.
- Leigh Rayment's historical List of Members of the Irish House of Commons. Cites: Johnston-Liik, Edith Mary (2002). The History of the Irish Parliament 1692-1800 (6 volumes). Ulster Historical Foundation.
