= Lord Lieutenant of Kinross-shire =

Ceremonial officer in Kinross-shire, Scotland

This is a list of people who have served as Lord Lieutenant of Kinross-shire:

- George Graham 17 March 1794 – 18 December 1801
- William Adam 30 January 1802 – 17 February 1839
- Sir Charles Adam 28 March 1839 – 16 September 1853
- Sir Graham Graham-Montgomery, 3rd Baronet 7 August 1854 – 2 June 1901
- Henry Moncreiff, 2nd Baron Moncreiff 18 July 1901 – 3 March 1909
- Sir Charles Adam, 1st Baronet 26 March 1909 – 1911
- John Moubray 9 November 1911 – 21 October 1928
- Alexander Haig 6 December 1928 – 1934
- Sir Henry Purvis-Russell-Montgomery, 7th Baronet 8 March 1934 – 1937
- James Avon Clyde, Lord Clyde 9 March 1937 – 16 June 1944
- Henry Purvis-Russell-Montgomery 9 October 1944 – 1 October 1954
- Charles Adam 15 January 1955 – 1966
- Robert Christie Stewart 27 May 1966 – 1974
- Sir David Butter 12 June 1974 – 1975

The office was replaced by the Lord Lieutenant of Perth and Kinross.

== Deputy lieutenants ==
A deputy lieutenant of Kinross-shire is commissioned by the Lord Lieutenant of Kinross-shire. Deputy lieutenants support the work of the lord-lieutenant. There can be several deputy lieutenants at any time, depending on the population of the county. Their appointment does not terminate with the changing of the lord-lieutenant, but they usually retire at age 75.

=== 19th Century ===
- 20 March 1846: Harry Young
- 20 March 1846: Sir Graham Graham-Montgomery, 3rd Baronet Stanhope
- 20 March 1846: William Adam
- 20 March 1846: Robert Neilson
