= Robert Thorburn (painter) =

Scottish miniature painter (1818–1885)

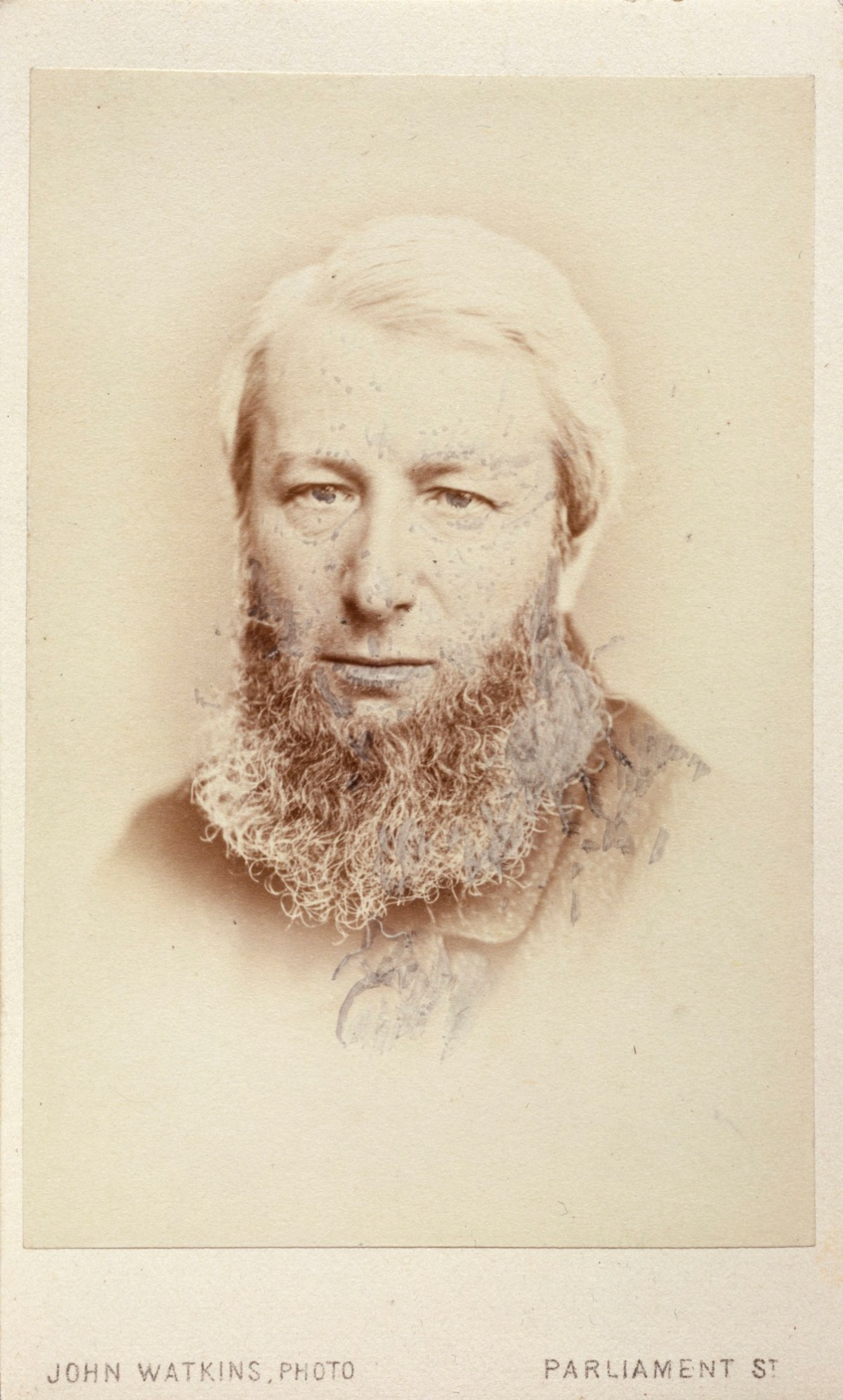
Albumen silver print, by John Watkins (c. 1856–75)

Robert Thorburn ARA (1818–1885) was a Scottish miniature-painter and associate of the Royal Academy.

== Life ==
Robert Thorburn, born at Dumfries in March 1818, was the son of a tradesman. He received his early education at Dumfries High School. He soon developed a love of art, and, owing to the kindness of a neighbouring lady, was at the age of fifteen sent to Edinburgh to draw at the Academy, where he made rapid progress and gained distinction. About three years later he came to London and entered the classes of the Royal Academy Schools. As a native of Dumfries he enjoyed the special patronage of the Duke of Buccleuch, whereby he obtained many commissions.

Thorburn's success as a miniature-painter was soon secured, and for many years he shared the patronage of fashionable society with Sir William Charles Ross. In 1846 he received his first commission from Queen Victoria; many followed. Miniature-portraits of the Queen, and of the queen with Edward VII, when Prince of Wales, are reproduced in Sir R. R. Holmes's Queen Victoria (1897).

Thorburn's miniatures were of a larger size than usual, showing more of the figure and often accompanied by a landscape background. They are painted on large pieces of ivory, sometimes on pieces joined. Their extreme finish produces a sense of monotony and flatness where the colours have lost their freshness. They were, however, very much admired at the time of their production, and at the Paris International Exhibition of 1855 Thorburn was awarded a gold medal. One of his most widely known miniatures is that of the Duchess of Manchester, a reproduction of which is given in J. J. Foster's British Miniature Painters (1898). The same work contains a portrait of Thorburn from a miniature by himself and a list of Thorburn's principal sitters, comprising most of the beautiful ladies of the time.

Thorburn was elected an associate of the Royal Academy in 1848. When photography began to supersede miniature painting, he took to oil-painting, and exhibited portraits and other subjects at the Royal Academy exhibitions with moderate success. He had a house at Lasswade, near Edinburgh, but died at Tunbridge Wells on 3 November 1885 in his sixty-eighth year, having quite outlived the great reputation of his earlier years.

== Gallery ==
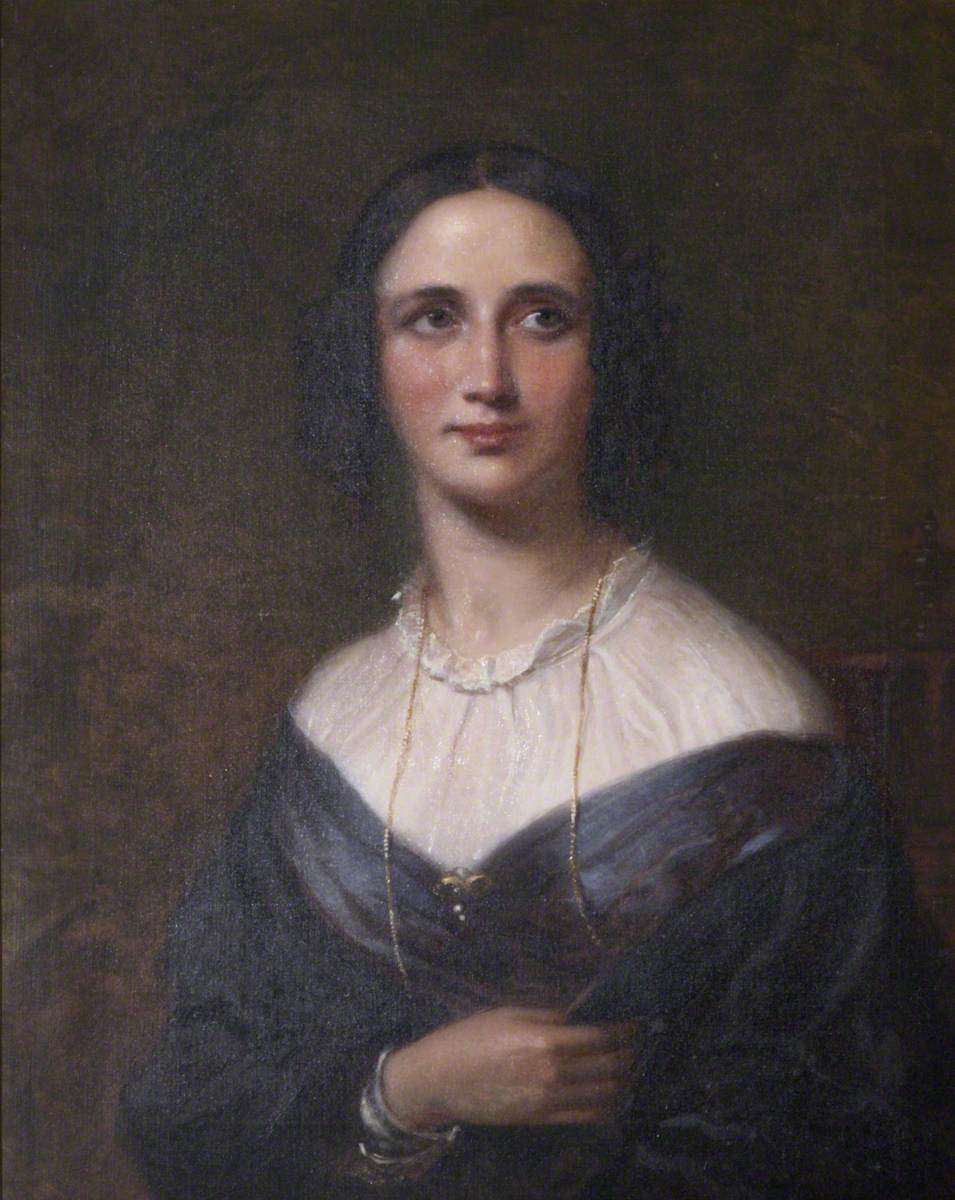
Juliana Pole-Carew, Lady Robartes (1839)

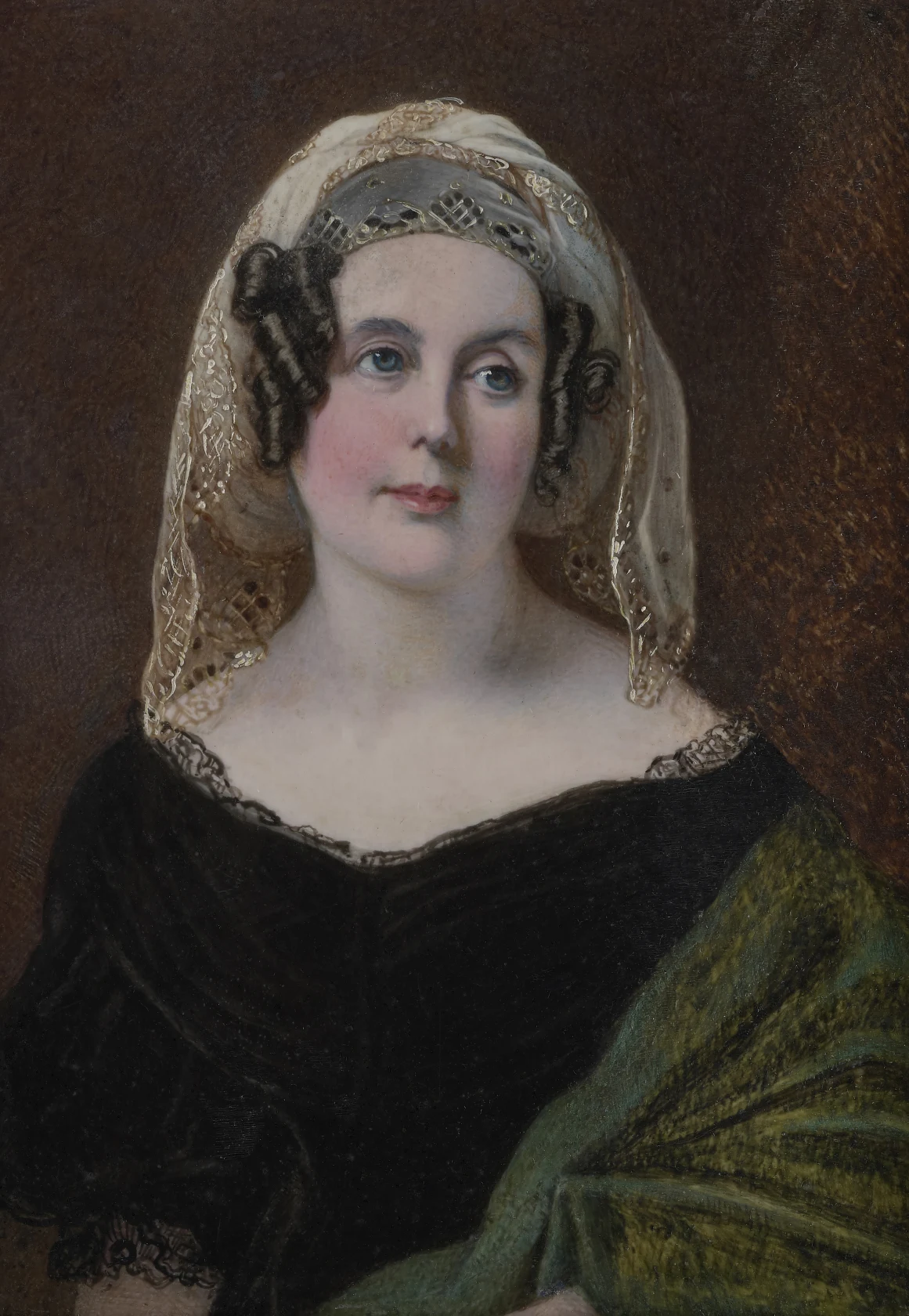
Charlotte Mary Hood, Baroness Bridport (c. 1840–45)

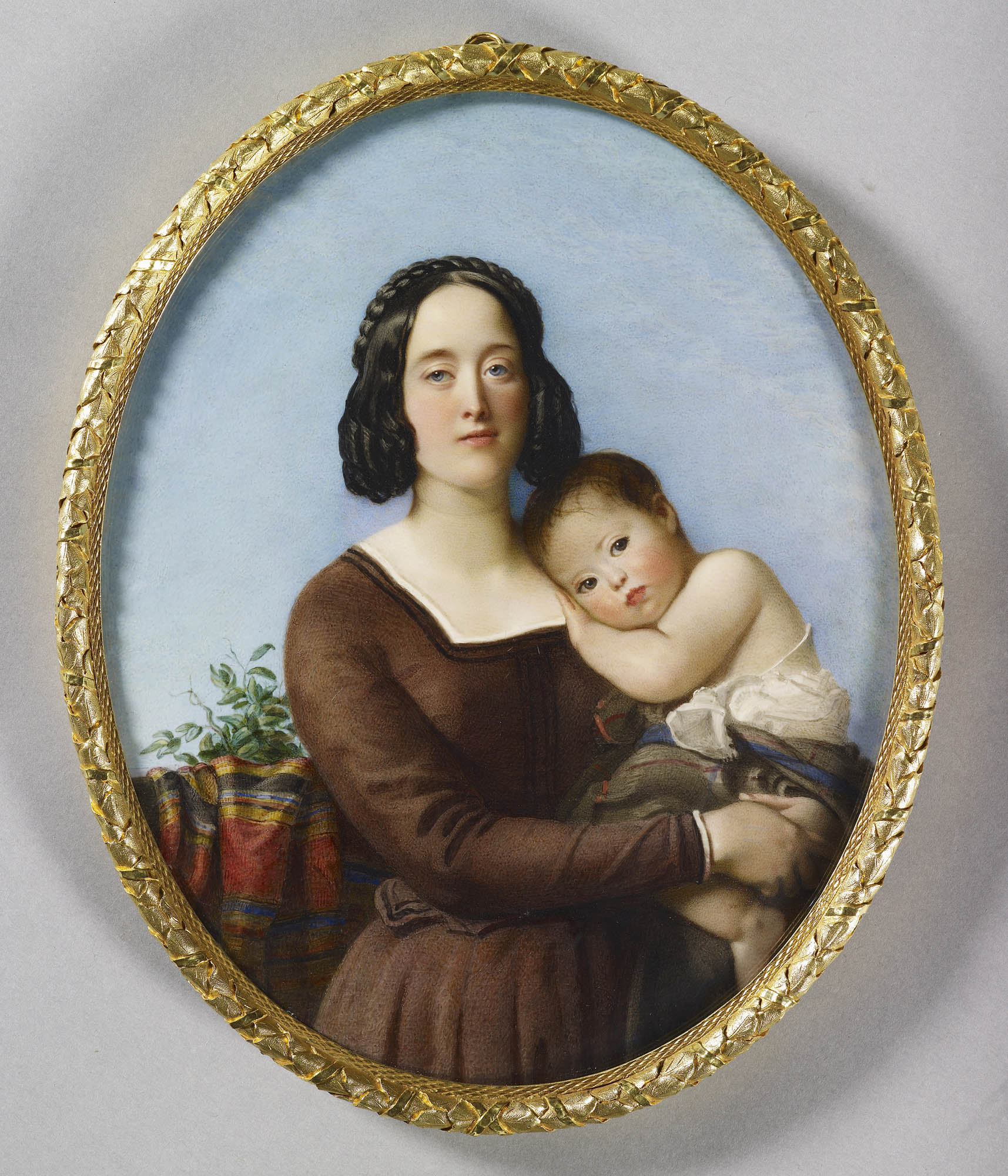
The Duchess of Buccleuch and her daughter Lady Victoria (1847)

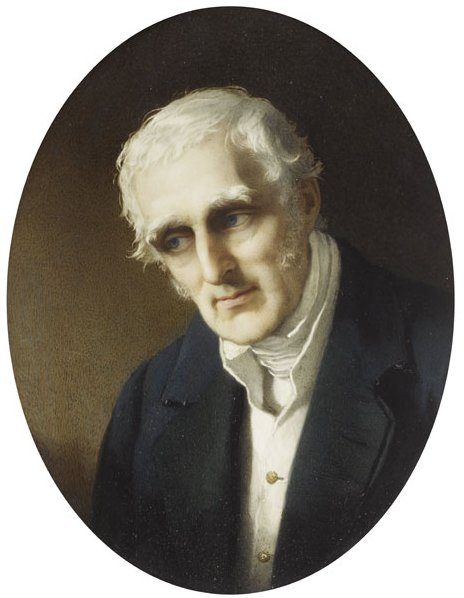
The Duke of Wellington (c. 1840–52)

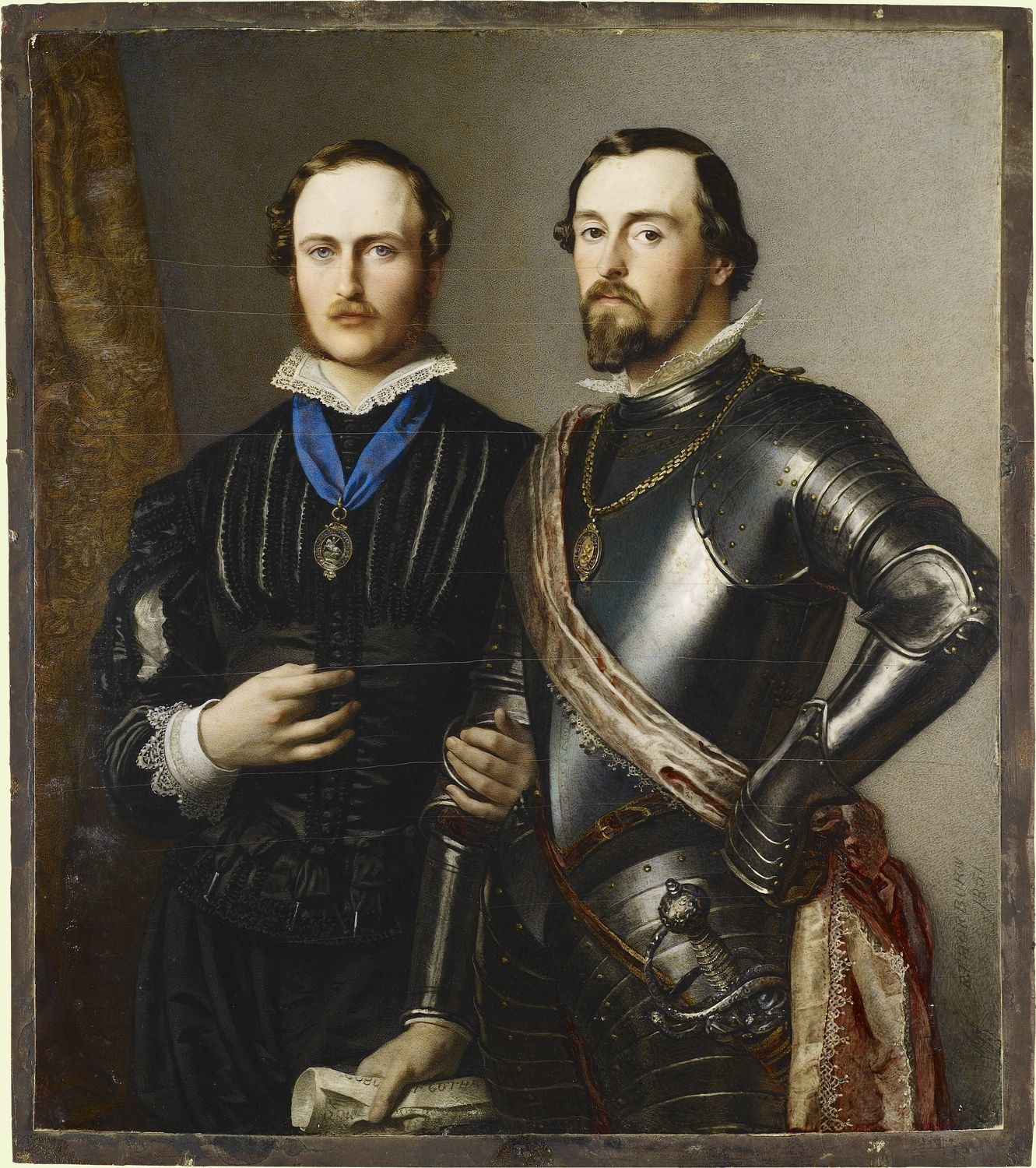
Prince Albert and Ernest II, Duke of Saxe-Coburg-Gotha (1851)

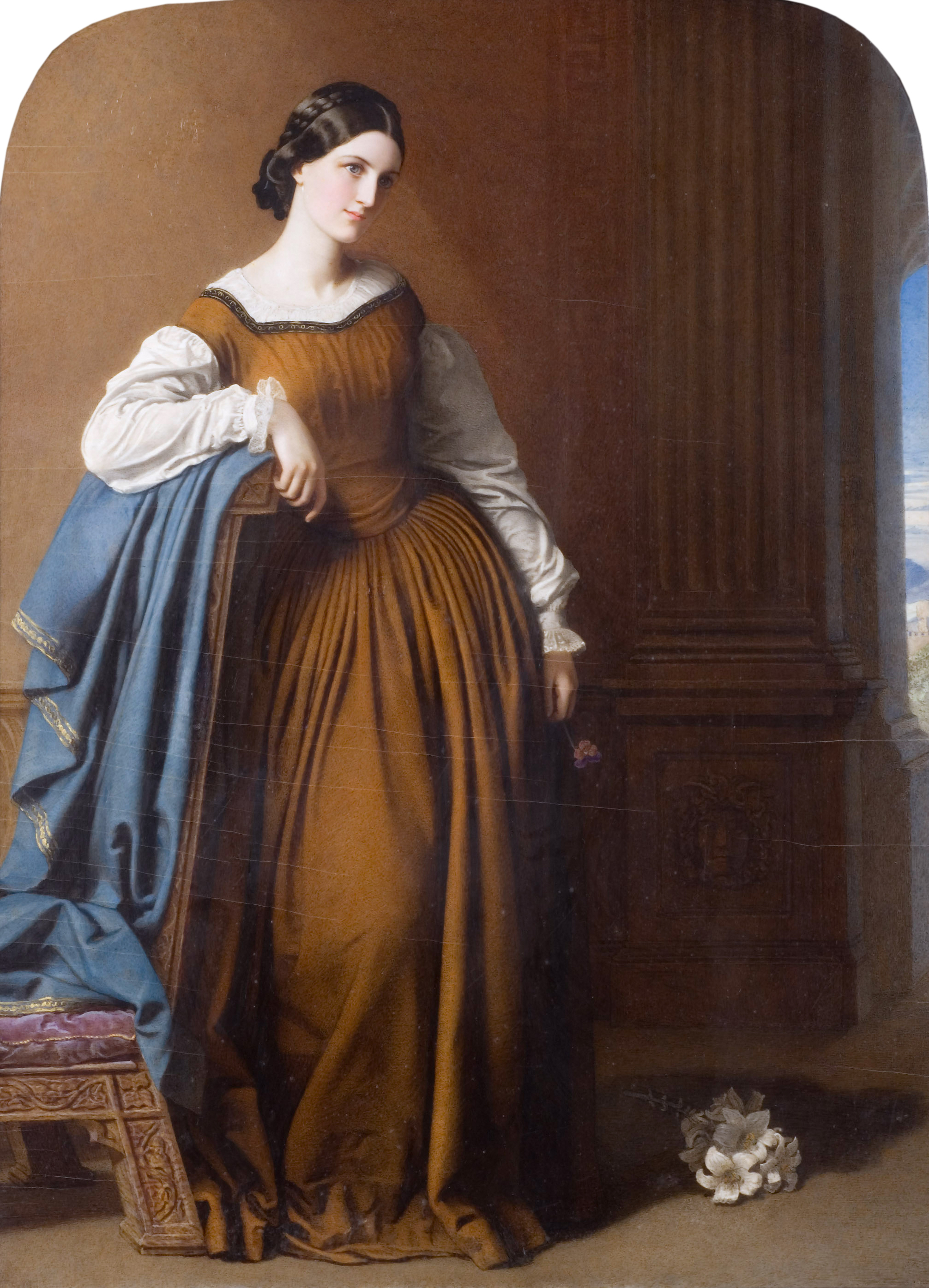
Mrs Georgina Maria Grenfell (Date unknown)
