= Montgomery baronets =

Set index on Montgomery baronets

There have been four baronetcies created for people with the surname Montgomery:

- Montgomery baronets of Skelmorly (1628), in the Baronetage of Nova Scotia, extinct 1735
- Montgomery baronets of Magbie Hill (1774), in the Baronetage of Great Britain, extinct 1831
- Montgomery baronets of Stanhope (1801), in the Baronetage of the United Kingdom
- Montgomery baronets of The Hall (1808), in the Baronetage of the United Kingdom, extinct 1939

== See also ==
- Montgomery-Cuninghame baronets
