= Tweedie =

Tweedie is a surname of Scottish origin. The name is a habitational name from Tweedie, located in the parish of Stonehouse, south of Glasgow. The origin and meaning of the name is unknown. Notable people with the surname include:

- Alexander Tweedie (1794–1884), Scottish physician and writer
- Andrew Tweedie (born 1975), South African cricketer
- Charles Tweedie (1868–1925), Scottish mathematician
- Dave Tweedie (born 1968), American composer, musician and record producer
- David Tweedie (accountant) (born 1944), Scottish accountant
- David Tweedie (mathematician) (1865–1934), Scottish mathematician
- David J. Tweedie (1870–1926), Scottish mathematician
- Ethel Brilliana Tweedie (1862–1940), British author and feminist
- Frederick Tweedie (1877–1943), Canadian politician
- George R. Tweedie (1857–1937), English businessman
- Herbert J. Tweedie (1864–1906), English golf course designer
- Hugh Tweedie, English naval officer
- Irina Tweedie (1907–1999), Russian-British Sufi
- Jill Tweedie (1936–1993), British feminist, writer and broadcaster
- Lemuel John Tweedie (1849–1917), Canadian politician, father of Frederick
- Mark Tweedie (born 1956), American politician
- Maurice Tweedie (1919–1996), British medical physicist and statistician
- Merylyn Tweedie (born 1953), New Zealand artist
- Michael Tweedie (1907–1993), naturalist and archaeologist
- Penny Tweedie (1940–2011), English photojournalist
- Richard Tweedie (1947–2001), Australian statistician
- Rob Tweedie (born 1979), American musician
- Sandie Tweedie (born 1985), Co-founder of Watermelon Tattoo ltd
- Scott Tweedie (born 1988), Australian television and radio presenter
- Stephen Tweedie (born 1969), Scottish software developer
- Thomas Tweedie (1871–1944), Canadian politician and jurist
- William Tweedie (1836–1914), Scottish major general and diplomat
- William King Tweedie (1803–1863), Scottish Presbyterian minister
- William Menzies Tweedie (1826–1878), Scottish portrait painter

== See also ==
- Clan Tweedie, a Scottish clan, or historical family in Scotland
- Tweedie, Alberta
- Tweedie distribution, any of a certain parameterized family of probability distributions
- Tweedy (disambiguation), a variant of name Tweedie
