= Baron of Stobo =

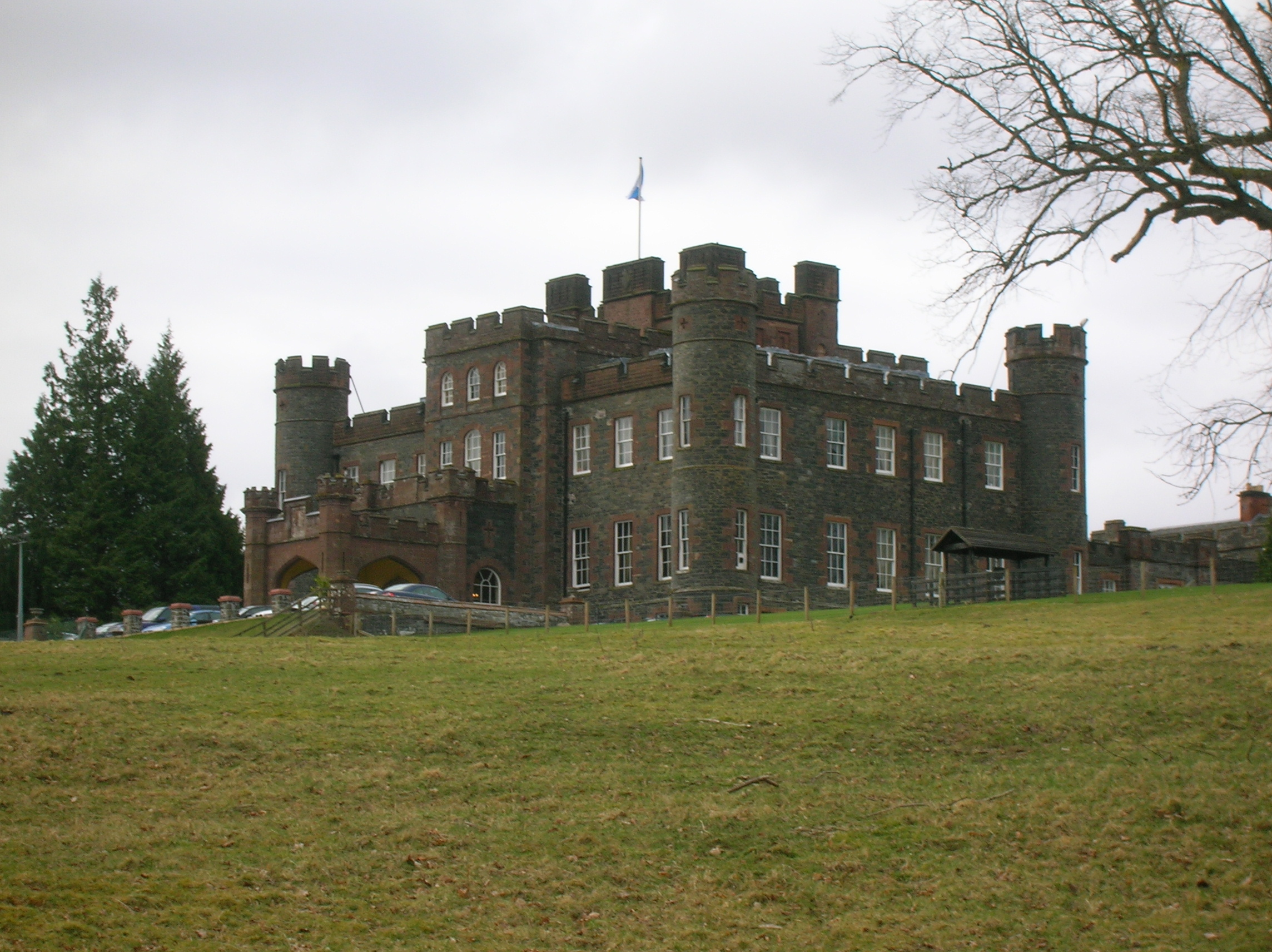
Stobo Castle, Seat of the Barony

Baron of Stobo is a title of nobility in the Baronage of Scotland which takes its name from Stobo in the Scottish Borders.

The barony has played an important role in Scottish history for almost five centuries. It was closely associated with the rise and fall of Stuart power in Scotland, its granting or forfeiture being used by turns to reward or punish those loyal to the House of Stuart.

== Origins ==
Claims have been made for the existence of the barony as early as the twelfth century. It is probable an Anglo-Norman lordship emerged during the turbulent period preceding the formation of the Scottish Marches, with its holder exercising customary powers of "pit and gallows, sake and soke, toll, team and infangthief".

The Scoto-Norman Sir John Ker(r), the so-called "Hunter of Swynhope", has been tentatively identified as a likely early Lord of Stobo (circa 1140). The de Ker family appears to have had its origins in Criel (now Criel-sur-Mer) in Normandy and was closely affiliated with Hugh de Morville, Lord of Lauderdale and Cunningham. The Kerrs later became a leading reiver clan (from which the Marquesses of Lothian descend). There is no evidence to support the existence of a pre-Norman thanage.

== History ==
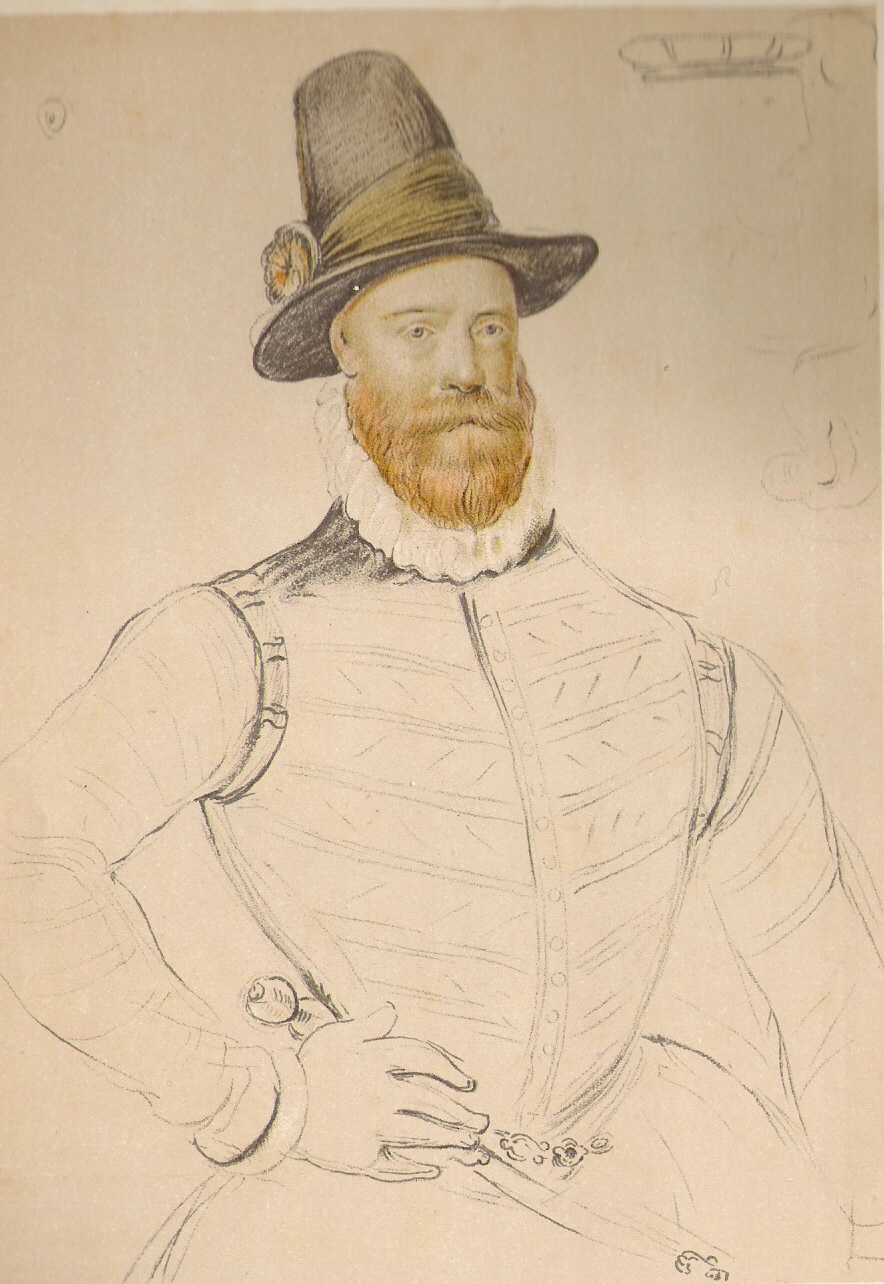
James Douglas, 4th Earl of Morton, short-lived 1st Baron of Stobo

At some point in the C12th, the barony came under the patronage of the Bishops of Glasgow as part of the Scottish Middle March. The barony may have been acquired by the Church or gifted to the bishopric either by the Kerr family or the Crown as part of the so-called "Davidian Revolution". King David I was instrumental in the foundation of burghs and regional markets, implementation of the ideals of Gregorian Reform, foundation of monasteries, Normanisation of government, and the introduction of feudalism throughout Scotland.

St Mungo's church at Stobo was the most important church in the upper Tweed Valley during the early medieval period. Pope Alexander III confirmed the church to the bishop of Glasgow, Engelram, in 1170. This was confirmed several times throughout the rest of the 12th and early 13th centuries. Sometime before 1266, and most likely in the early 12th century, Stobo became a prebend of Glasgow Cathedral, which continued as such until the Reformation. The advowson of "Stobou" was confirmed by the pope in 1216, and in 1319 Edward II of England, as Overlord of Scotland, claimed to exercise the right of patronage. ‘Peter, the dean of Stobhou’ witnessed charters of the bishops of Glasgow between 1175 and 1199. In 1369, 1482 and 1486, Stobo appears as one of the baronies of the bishopric of Glasgow, and in 1489-90 it was erected by James IV into a free regality of Robert, bishop of Glasgow, and his successors. Stobo had 5 chaplaincies: Lyne, Broughton, Kingledoors, Dawic and Drummelzier". According to George Mackenzie, "a Lord of Regality is a Regulus, a little King" and thus the actions of James IV placed the Bishops of Glasgow in a powerful position, in effect placing them beyond the reach of Crown officers (although not of the Crown itself).

The Reformation radically changed this position, with the Crown seizing and then re-granting the barony to James Douglas, 4th Earl of Morton. Morton was one of the four Regents of Scotland during the minority of James VI and I. The Crown Charter of 1577 survives but Morton's possession of the barony itself was short-lived. He was executed in 1581 for his part in the murder of Henry Stuart, Lord Darnley, King Consort to Mary, Queen of Scots.

The barony was re-granted in 1587 to Sir John Maitland, Lord Chancellor of Scotland, who in 1590 became 1st Lord Maitland of Thirlestane, in recognition of his role in arranging the marriage of James VI to Anne of Denmark. Maitland is generally considered the principal architect of Stuart rule during this period.

Over the following century, ownership of the barony alternated between two competing sets of Stuart supporters: Maitland's descendants, the powerful Earls of Lauderdale, chiefs of Clan Maitland and hereditary bearers of the National Flag of Scotland and the Dukes of Lennox and Richmond, chiefs of the Clan Stewart of Darnley and favoured kinsmen of James I, Charles I and Charles II. It was also owned briefly in the early seventeenth century by a local reiver family, the Tweedies of Dreva.

In the 1630s, the barony passed to the Murrays, a family of staunch Stuart supporters. In 1664, the family received a baronetcy from Charles II for their support of the Royalist cause and became known as the Murrays of Stanhope. In 1697, Stobo was erected into a free barony by Crown Charter.

The Murrays were ruined by their support for the Jacobite cause, with Sir David Murray, 4th Baronet, forfeiting all his lands and being attainted for his role in the 1745 Rebellion. Murray died in exile at Leghorn in 1769. Lord Stobo's Lament, a traditional Scots air, commemorates this tragic episode in the history of the barony.

== Forfeiture ==
In 1767, Stobo was purchased out of forfeiture for £40,000, as part of the Stanhope estate, by James Montgomery, Lord Advocate.

In 1767, Montgomery also acquired a substantial and highly lucrative interest in the colonisation of Canada's Prince Edward Island; an investment which funded his son, the 2nd baronet to build Stobo Castle between 1805 and 1811 in place of an earlier fortified tower house known as Hillhouse or Wester Stobo. Sir James had acquired a baronetcy in 1801, thereafter styling himself Sir James Montgomery of Stanhope.

The barony of Stobo remained in the possession of the Graham-Montgomery family until 1905 and then, in the possession of the Earls of Dysart until 1972.

== The seat of barony and its extent ==
The seat (“caput”) of the barony is Stobo Castle. The listed castle and its grounds have operated as a luxury spa hotel since the mid-1970s. The adjacent 3,884-acre Stobo Estate was broken up and sold in late 2020.

The barony is situated in historic Peeblesshire, its southern boundary skirting the north bank of the River Tweed. According to Bearhop's map of 1740, it originally encompassed some 7,000 acres across Stobo, West Dawyck, Easttoun and Westtoun, Dreva, to Muirburn Castle in modern-day West Tweeddale.
