= David Tweedie =

David Tweedie may refer to:

- David Tweedie (accountant) (born 1944), Scottish accountant who served as chairman of the International Accounting Standards Board
- Dave Tweedie (born 1968), American composer, multi-instrumentalist and record producer
- David Tweedie (mathematician) (1865–1934), Scottish mathematician who taught in Egypt
- David J. Tweedie (1870–1926), Scottish mathematician
