= Mossfennan =

Village in Scottish Borders, Scotland

Coordinates: 55.5707°N 3.4012°W

Mossfennan is a small settlement in southern Scotland near Drumelzier in the Scottish Borders, in the valley of the River Tweed.

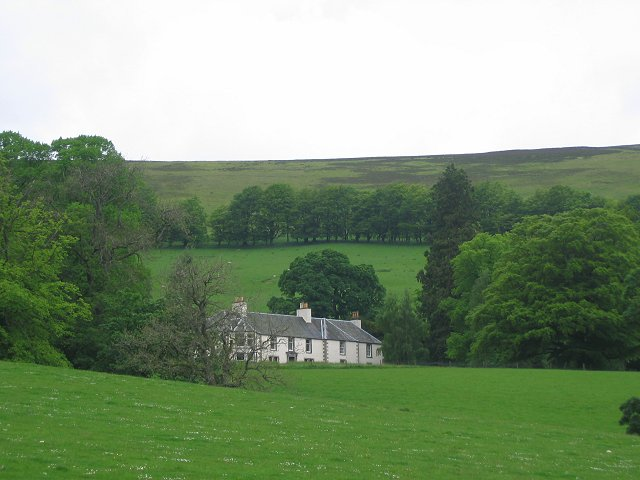
House at Mossfennan

Mossfennan is a wooded area part of the parish of Glenholm. There was once a peel tower at Mossfennan. Also near Mossfennan are the remains of a Bronze Age burial cairn. When the Talla Railway was built there was a spectacular overhead sheep crossing at Mossfennan which consisted of six concrete piers and a long ramps at right angles to the railway track.

Mossfennan appears in literature being referenced in an old Scottish ballad.

'The King rode round the Merecleuch Head,
Wi' spotted hounds and spaniels three,
Then lichted doun at Mossfennan Yett,
A little below the Logan Lee.'

John Veitch also describes the locality in The Hart of Mossfennan

Next Peel tower upwards	Tweed Valley	Next Peel tower downwards
Stanhope	Mossfennan	Wrae Tower
