= Tweedy =

Tweedy may refer to:

- Tweedy (surname)
- Tweedy (band), an American rock band
- USS Tweedy (DE-532), a U.S. Navy destroyer
- Clan Tweedy, a Scottish clan
- Tweedy Bird Loc (1967–2020), American rapper
- Tweedy the Clown

== See also ==
- Tweedie
