= Ellice Horsburgh =

Scottish engineer and mathematician (1870–1935)

Ellice Martin Horsburgh FRSE AMICE (1870 – 28 December 1935) was a Scottish mathematician and engineer. He was an expert on numismatics and a skilled photographer.

== Life ==
He was born in Kelso in 1870, the son of Ellen Sarah Vost and the Rev Andrew Horsburgh, a preacher and missionary in India.

He was educated at the Collegiate School, 27/28 Charlotte Square in Edinburgh. He then trained for the Indian Civil Service with Wren and Gurney but, falling very ill, was instructed to go to Australia to improve his health. During this sea journey he became interested in navigational mathematics. He arrived at Melbourne during a financial panic and then got mixed up in the Coolgardie Gold Rush of 1892. After two years of little success as a gold miner he returned to Scotland in 1894.

He then went to the University of Edinburgh where he graduated MA BSc in engineering in 1897. He gained a further BSc in mathematics and natural philosophy (physics) in 1899. He began lecturing in electrical engineering at Leith Technical College around 1900. In 1903 he moved to the University of Edinburgh.

In 1904 he was elected a Fellow of the Royal Society of Edinburgh. His proposers were George Chrystal, Charles Tweedie, Sir Thomas Hudson Beare and Cargill Gilston Knott. The University of Edinburgh awarded him an honorary doctorate (DSc) in 1912. From 1920 to 1935 he was a Reader in Technical Mathematics. He also worked as a consultant to Brunton’s Wire Mills in Musselburgh.

He died at his home, 11 Granville Terrace in Edinburgh on 28 December 1935. He is buried in Dirleton Kirkyard in East Lothian, east of Edinburgh.

== Family ==
He married Helen Howden Ferme in 1920.

== Publications ==
- Calculating Machines (1919)
- The Fracture of Wire in Steel Ropes (1921)
- Modern Instruments and Methods of Calculation (1914)
