= Stanhope, Peeblesshire =

Coordinates: 55.553°N 3.393°W

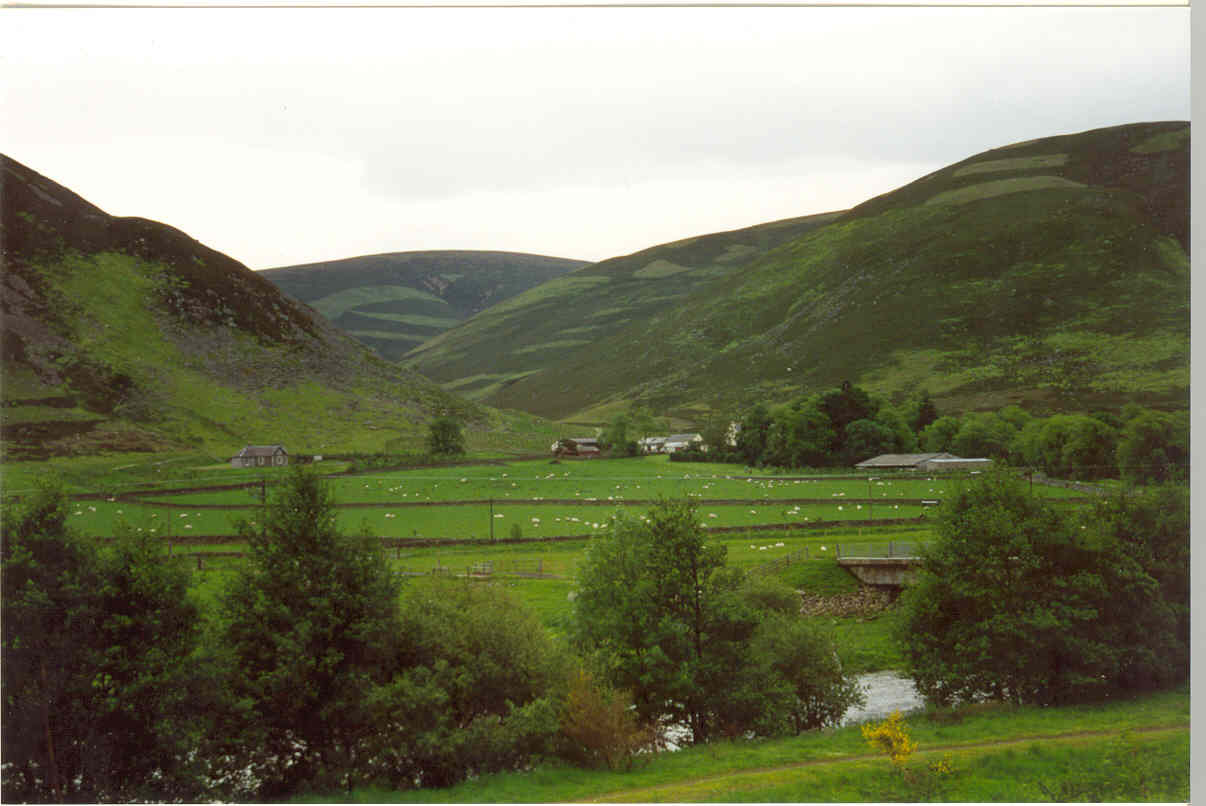
View of Stanhope in the Tweed Valley

Stanhope is a small settlement in the Scottish Borders region. It is situated in the parish of Drumelzier in Peeblesshire, in the valley of the River Tweed.

The Murray family acquired and established a Barony at Stanhope in 1634 as part of an estate that extended into Tweedsmuir. The settlement consists of a cluster of buildings by Stanhope Burn. It was the property of Sir David Murray, nephew of John Murray of Broughton who was active in the Jacobite rebellion of 1745. As a result of his participation the Murray estates at Broughton, Stobo and Stanhope were confiscated (as were those other Jacobite sympathisers) and in 1761 it was still in the hands of creditors. Stanhope and Stobo were sold by order of the Court of Session by deed in 1767 to a James Montgomery. Many properties on the Stanhope estate were tenanted by members of the Tweedie family with whom the Murrays had at various times fought or intermarried.

== See also ==
- Holms Water
- List of places in the Scottish Borders

Next Peel tower upwards	Tweed Valley	Next Peel tower downwards
Kingledoors	Stanhope	Mossfennan
