= David Tweedie (mathematician) =

(1865–1934) Scottish mathematician

- Born: 22 April 1865; Swinton School House, Swinton, Berwickshire, Scotland
- Died: 22 March 1934 (aged 68); Edinburgh, Scotland
- Education: Swinton Parish School; George Watson's School; University of Edinburgh
- Spouses: Elizabeth Mary Inglis (married 1905, died 1931); Gladys Emily Jones (married 1933)
- Children: Rose Marie (1906); George (1907)
- Awards: EMS Treasurer 1895-1898
- Scientific career
- Fields: Mathematics
- Workplaces: George Watson's College; Ras-el-Tin Government School, Alexandria; Government College, Cairo; Ministry of Public Instruction, Cairo

David Tweedie (1865, Swinton – 1934, Edinburgh) was a Scottish mathematician, who taught in Scotland and Egypt.

== Biography ==
Tweedie was the son of George Tweedie (1837–1905, a schoolmaster, inspector of the poor and registrar) and Charlotte Lugton (1836–1909). He was the oldest of nine children: Annie (born 1866), Charles (born 1868), Euphemia (born 1870), George (born 1872), Andrew (born 1873), Charlotte (born 1875), William (born 1877), and Jessie (born 1879). One of his brothers, Charles Tweedie, also became a mathematician.

He attended Swinton Parish School from 1869 to 1879 and George Watson's School in Edinburgh from 1879 to 1881. He matriculated at the University of Edinburgh in 1881 at the age of sixteen. He obtained an MA (First class) in Mathematics from University of Edinburgh in 1886 and a BSc (Mathematics) in 1887.

He taught mathematics at George Watson's College and in 1892 joined the Edinburgh Mathematical Society. He was appointed Honorary Treasurer of the society from 1895 to 1898. In 1898 Tweedie went to Egypt to work at the Ras-El-Tin Government School in Alexandria. Tweedie taught at the Government College in Cairo, and then in 1904 moved to the Ministry of Public Instruction in Cairo.

From 1915 to 1923 Tweedie worked as Lecturer in Mathematics at the Royal School of Engineering, Cairo.

== Personal life ==
In 1905 Tweedie married Elizabeth Mary Inglis and they had two children: Rose Marie (born 1906) and George (born 1907). Elizabeth died in 1931.

In 1932 Tweedie moved to Llanwern, Newport, Monmouthshire, Wales and in 1933 he married Gladys Emily Jones. Tweedie died on 22 March 1934 in Edinburgh.

== See also ==
- Clan Tweedie
- Tweedie

== Sources ==
- The Tweedie Family – a genealogy
- O'Connor, John J.; Robertson, Edmund F., "David Tweedie", MacTutor History of Mathematics Archive, University of St Andrews
