= Tweedy (surname) =

Tweedy is a Scottish surname. Notable people with the surname include:

- Alfred Tweedy (born 1880), American politician
- Alice B. Tweedy (1850–1934), American journalist and writer
- Cheryl Tweedy (born 1983), English singer, dancer, and television personality
- Damon Tweedy, American physician and academic
- Frank Tweedy (1854–1937), American botanist
- George Tweedy (1913–1987), English footballer
- Hilda Tweedy (1911–2005), Irish women's rights activist
- Jeff Tweedy (born 1967), American songwriter, musician, and record producer
- John Tweedy (1849–1924), British surgeon
- John Hubbard Tweedy (1814–1891), American politician
- Samuel Tweedy (1776–1868), American politician
