= Wrae Tower =

Tower house in Scottish Borders, Scotland

Coordinates: 55.58437°N 3.40554°W

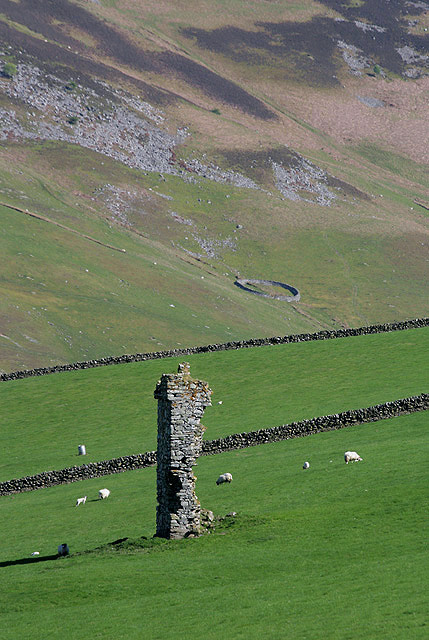
Little remains of Wrae Tower

Wrae Tower is a ruined 16th-century stone tower house, located in the upper Tweed Valley in the Scottish Borders area of Scotland, and similarly south of the village of Broughton. The ruin is at grid reference NT115332, 3 km south-west of Drumelzier. Only a fragment of the north-east corner stair tower, around 9m high and 4m across, remains standing. A single jamb represents the north-west ground floor entrance to the tower and crowning the north-east wall is rough corbelling, which supports the remains of a parapet. The tower was probably built by the Tweedies of Drumelzier, who owned the surrounding lands since 1320.

== See also ==
- List of places in the Scottish Borders
- List of places in Scotland

Next Peel tower upwards	Tweed Valley	Next Peel tower downwards
Mossfennan	Wrae Tower	Drumelzier
