= David J. Tweedie =

(1870–1926) Scottish mathematician

David James Tweedie
- Born: 17 October 1870; Edinburgh, Scotland
- Died: 26 August 1926 (aged 55); Stichill, Roxburgh, Scotland
- Education: University of Edinburgh
- Spouse: Jeanie Fleming Allison (married 1879)
- Children: Jean (Ena) (born 1898); David (born 1901)
- Scientific career
- Fields: Mathematics
- Institutions: George Heriot's School; Public School, Kilconquhar

David James Tweedie (1870–1926) was a Scottish mathematician, educated at the University of Edinburgh who became the Headmaster of the Public School, Kilconquhar, Fife.

== Biography ==
Tweedie was born to David Tweedie (1847, a colliery clerk and book keeper) and Jemima Tweedie (1845). He was the oldest of 5 children. His siblings were Marjory (born 1875), Alice (born 1877), James (born 1881) and John (born 1885).

He attended the University of Edinburgh in 1889, where he first studied English, Latin and Greek. In 1892 he changed course to Mathematics, Natural Philosophy and Chemistry. He graduated with an MA in 1895. He then went on to teach at George Heriot's Hospital School in Edinburgh.

In January 1897, Tweedie joined the Edinburgh Mathematical Society. He was one several members of the Society with the name Tweedie. The following year he took up the position of Headmaster, Public School, Kilconquhar, Fife and the next year, as he was no longer in Edinburgh, he left the Society.

== Personal life ==
Tweedie married Jeanie (Jessie) Fleming Allison on 13 April 1879 and they had two children: Jean (Ena) (born 1898) and David (born 1901).

== See also ==
- Clan Tweedie
- Tweedie

== Source ==
- The Tweedie family – a genealogy
