= Sir David Murray, 4th Baronet =

Scottish Jacobite soldier

Arms of Murray of Stanhope: 1 and 4. Argent, a hunting horn sable, garnished gules; on a chief azure three mullets of the field. 2. Azure, three fraises argent. 3. Argent, on a chief gules three cushions or.

Sir David Murray, 4th Baronet (died 1769) was a Scottish Jacobite soldier.

== Biography ==
Murray was the son of David Murray, a merchant, and Frances Macclesfield. He was the nephew of Sir Alexander Murray, 3rd Baronet, and succeeded to his uncle's baronetcy on 18 May 1743. He was the captain of a regiment of hussars and was active in the Jacobite rising of 1745 in the army of Charles Edward Stuart. He was taken prisoner, attainted of his lands and title and sentenced to death at York in 1746, but was pardoned on the condition that he left Scotland for life. Murray left the British Isles to live in exile with Charles Edward Stuart in France, where he was granted a pension of 1,000 livres by Louis XV. He was in Paris with the Prince in 1749. His estates at Stobo, Stanhope and Broughton in Peeblesshire were sold in 1767. He died in Leghorn in 1769.

Baronetage of Nova Scotia
Preceded by Alexander Murray	Baronet (of Stanhope); 1743–1746	Attainted
