= Alice B. Tweedy =

American journalist

- Born: Mary Alice Belcher; 1850; St. Louis, Missouri, United States
- Died: 1934 (aged 83–84)
- Education: Milwaukee College; University of Michigan
- Spouse: James F. Tweedy (m. 1872, death)
- Children: 5

Mary Alice Belcher Tweedy (1850–1934) was an American journalist and writer. She was the first woman to be accepted at the College of Arts and Sciences at Washington University in St. Louis, and the first woman to work for the St. Louis Democrat. She also wrote for the New York Evening Post and contributed to Popular Science Monthly, or PopSci, from 1889 to 1896. Her work paved the way for future women in journalism.

Tweedy's articles often focused on science and feminism. She believed in the right to vote and the importance of access to education for women. Tweedy was quoted by the editor in the October 1896 volume of Popular Science Monthly for disclaiming the idea that "women's suffrage is proposed as a panacea for social evils, or that it will usher in a millennial condition. Man would be disenfranchised if such requirement was made of his vote."

== Early life and education ==
Mary Alice Belcher was born in St. Louis in 1850, to William and Mary Belcher. When Belcher was nine years old, she moved with her family to Chicago. After her father died in 1866, the family relocated to Wisconsin.

Belcher attended Milwaukee College from 1867 to 1869. With her mother's encouragement, Belcher returned to St. Louis to continue her education, applying for Washington University in 1870. She later became the first woman accepted into the university's College of Arts and Sciences, though shortly after, she transferred to the University of Michigan in hopes of receiving a more challenging education.

== Career ==
Belcher began her career writing for the St. Louis Democrat to receive a wage while attending university. She was first woman to work at the newspaper.

From 1889 to 1896, Tweedy wrote for the New York Evening Post and contributed to Popular Science Monthly, or PopSci. Tweedy's articles often focused on science and feminism. She believed in the right to vote and the importance of access to education for women. Tweedy was quoted by the editor in the October 1896 volume of Popular Science Monthly for disclaiming the idea that "women's suffrage is proposed as a panacea for social evils, or that it will usher in a millennial condition. Man would be disenfranchised if such requirement was made of his vote."

Tweedy also wrote poetry. In February 1905, her poem "War's Song" was published in Vol. 67 of The Advocate of Peace.

== Personal life ==
Belcher met her husband, James Fisher Tweedy, while studying at the University of Michigan. The couple married on September 12, 1872, and eventually had five children. After both graduated, they moved to New York.

James Tweedy died in 1914 or 1915, within weeks of one of the couple's daughters.

Alice Belcher Tweedy died in 1934.
