= Clan Tweedie =

Scottish clan

- Crest: A bull's head.
- Motto: "Thol and Think" ("Thole" is an old Scottish word meaning "suffer" or "endure").
- Clan Tweedie no longer has a chief, and is an armigerous clan
Allied clans
Clan Fraser
Rival clans
Clan Ged (Geddes)
Clan Fleming

Tweedie or Tweedy is a Scottish clan name. The Clan Tweedie does not currently have a chief recognized by the Lord Lyon King of Arms and is therefore considered an Armigerous clan. However the surname is also considered a sept of the Clan Fraser. The name is derived from the lands of Tweedie which were along the Valley of the River Tweed in Peebleshire in the Scottish Borders.

== History ==
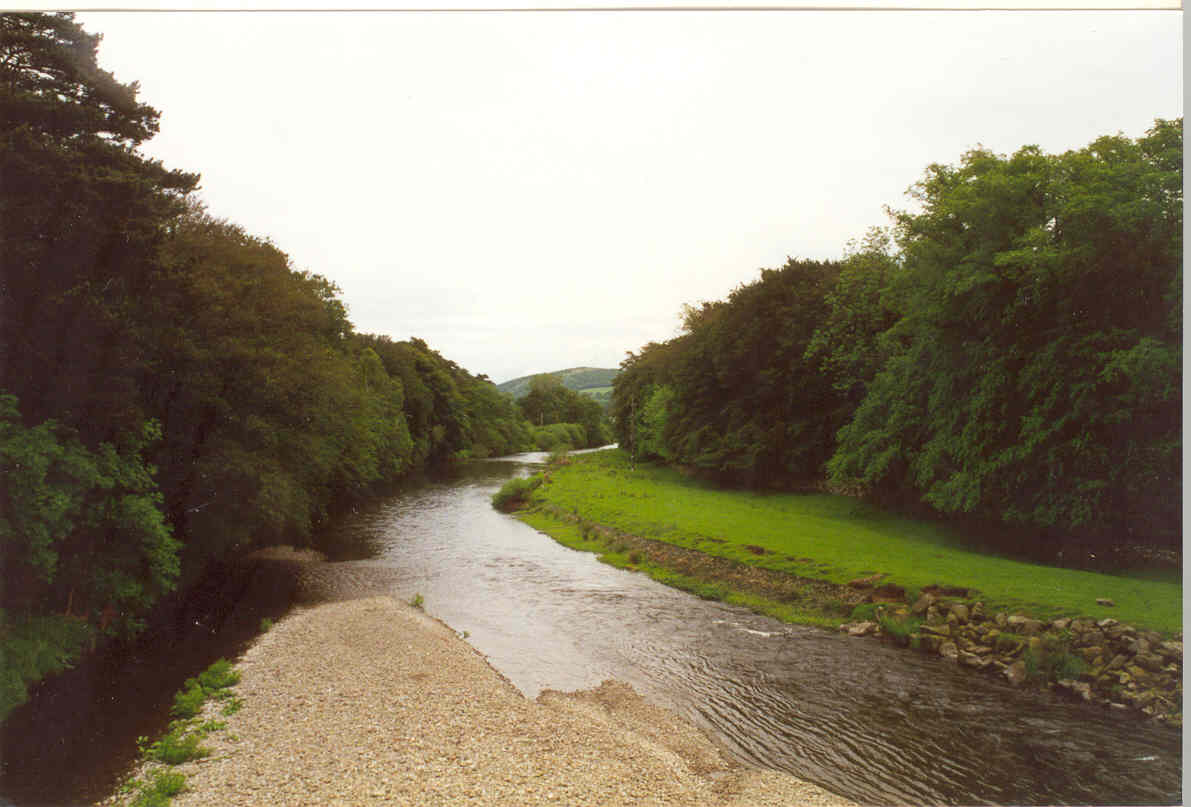
River Tweed near Drummelzier

=== Mythical origins of the clan ===
Scottish tradition ascribes the origin of the Tweedie name to be that of a water sprite in the River Tweed. Legend tells of a husband who went off to fight in the crusades and while he was away his young wife became pregnant and so he returned home to find he had a son. His wife then told him that she had gone down to the banks of the River Tweed and had been accosted by a fairy of the river and become pregnant by him. Her husband, for whatever reason, chose to believe this story but on the condition that the son kept the surname of Tweedie. However the family name was certainly derived from the lands of Tweedie whether the story about the water fairy or spirit is true or not.

=== Early history ===
The Tweedies have a history of being a powerful and domineering family, whose principal seat was Drumelzier in Tweeddale. The first recorded Tweedie is John de Tueda as he describes himself in the reign of Alexander II (1214–1249), who afterwards had a Charter from Alexander III (1249–1286), granted him under the name of John de Tuedy. He was the owner of lands on the River Tweed from which the family took their name, and even then the family connections and possessions were widespread and powerful

Finlay de Twydyn appears in the Ragman Rolls of 1296 swearing fealty to King Edward I of England, and his son Roger of Twydyn, received a charter to the house and lands of Drumelzier around 1320. The family held these lands for over 300 years. Chambers in his History of Peebleshire described the Tweedies as being a savage race and another commentator of the eighteenth century described them as being a powerful and domineering family.

=== Tweedie of Drummelzier ===
The main centre of the Tweedie family until the 17th century was at Drummelzier, with other branches living at Wrae, Stobo, Dreva, Fruid and other forts and peel towers along the valley. The early history is one of lawlessness, typical of the Scottish borders at that time, with deadly feuds with neighbouring families, particularly the Veitch's. The Tweedies would charge tolls on travellers passing through their territory, be accused or the victims of cattle rustling, and become embroiled in affrays, often fatal, in the streets of Edinburgh.

A major incident occurred in 1524 when a large group of Tweedies were involved in the slaughter of Lord Fleming (chief of Clan Fleming) and the abduction of his son Malcolm Fleming, 3rd Lord Fleming – the dispute concerning the latter's intention to marry Catherine Fraser who in fact ended up marrying James Tweedie of Drummelzier. In 1592 another James Tweedie of Drumelzier was accused of the murder of Geddes of Glenhegdon in Edinburgh. The complaint against him states that it was not known how many slaughters had been committed by James Tweedie of Drumelzier and his friends. The ancient quarrel with the Veitches still broke out at times, and in 1611 attracted the notice of King James, one of whose last acts before leaving for England was to visit the district of Upper Tweedale with a view to staunching this bloody feud. However a year later it is said James Tweedie lay dead after a duel with Veitch of Dawick.

The fortunes of the Drummelzier family declined, and in 1633 the last Tweedie of Drummelzier was forced to sell the Barony of Drummelzier to Lord Hay of Yester.

=== Tweedie of Oliver ===
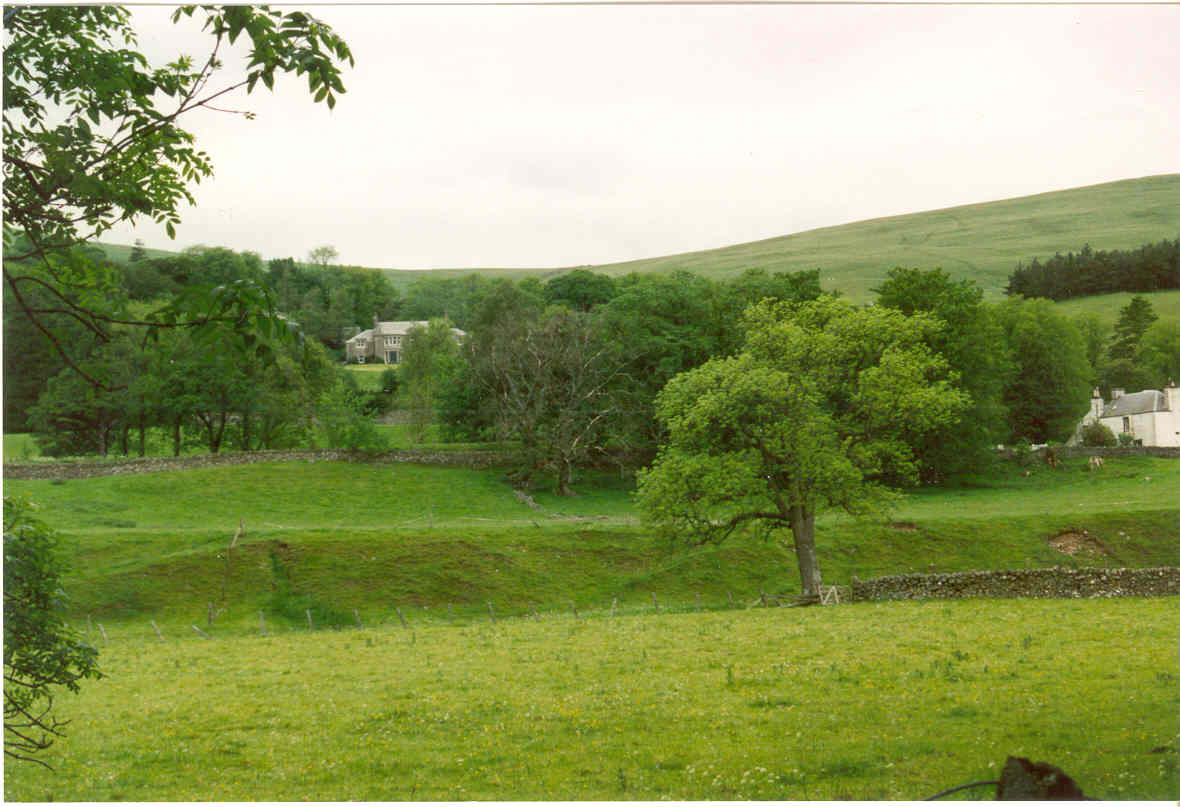
Oliver from Nether Minzion

The Tweedies of Oliver Castle descend from a younger son of Drumelzier and they obtained their lands in the parish of Tweedsmuir from the preceptor of Torphichen in the 14th century.

In 1524 Thomas Tweedie of Oliver Castle was implicated in the murder of Lord Fleming (chief of Clan Fleming) which erupted into a bloody feud between the two families. Thomas was exiled from Scotland for three years in 1521. His son William is said to have been implicated in the conspiracy to murder Rizzio, the favourite of Mary, Queen of Scots. He and Adam Tweedie were among the body of armed men who, headed by Darnley, Morton, Ruthven, and others, on the night of 9 March 1566, rushed into the Palace at Holyrood and in the Queen's presence assassinated David Rizzio, her foreign Secretary and favourite musician. Along with the other conspirators, they were summoned on 19 March following to appear personally before the King and Queen and the Lords of the Secret Council to answer for the crime.

Subsequently, the Tweedies of Oliver adopted a more settled existence as comparatively prosperous landowners. In 1745 the Laird of that time, Thomas Tweedie, and other members of the family were careful to avoid any involvement in the Jacobite rising when Highland clans crossed the valley. However Tweedies attestation to the considerate and respectful behaviour Captain John Burnet of Colonel Grant's Highland Regiment on that occasion may have contributed to the latter's subsequent pardon.

=== Later descent from Oliver ===
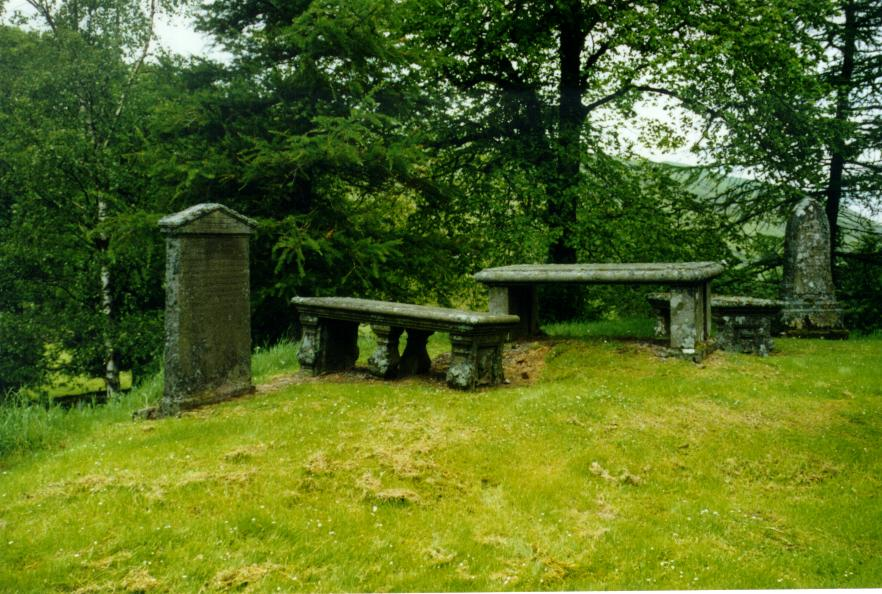
Tweedie stones in Tweedsmuir church yard

This Thomas Tweedie married Mary Stevenson daughter of Alexander Stevenson of Venlaw Castle Their eldest son James inherited Oliver, but the line died out with Lawrence Tweedie (died 1837) who bequeathed Oliver to his nephew George Stodart provided he took the surname Tweedie and quartered the arms. The resulting Tweedie-Stodart descent has also since died out.

Thomas Tweedie's second son, another Thomas who lived at Kingledoors, is the antecedent of most of the Tweedies of Oliver descent through his son Alexander. Of Alexander's three sons, Thomas Stevenson Tweedie (1784–1855) became a surgeon in the East India Company. He had a family through an Anglo-Indian wife which he later disowned, and another family in Scotland. He added largely to the Quarter estate by purchasing many ancient possessions of the family, Kingledoors, Glenrath and Wrae, and also Rachan. His brother Maurice Tweedie (1787–1867) was a major general in the Indian Army who was Resident at Tanjore, served through the Coorg Campaign and other fighting, and commanded troops at Penang, Singapore, and Malacca. The third brother Michael Tweedie (1791–1874) also a soldier served in the Royal Artillery during the Peninsular War (1808–14). He married Frances Forbes and moved the Kent, establishing the Rawlinson Rolvenden line.

Michael Tweedie's son, another Michael Tweedie (1836–1917), was a major-general in the 1850s, throughout the Crimean War and during the Indian Mutiny. His son Admiral Sir Hugh Tweedie (1877–1951) had a distinguished naval career in the Royal Navy – he was aide-de-camp to King George V in 1925 and retired as an admiral in 1936, but was recalled at the outbreak of World War II. He was created a Knight of the Bath, in addition to holding the French Legion of Honour and the Japanese Order of the Rising Sun. Michael Forbes Tweedie, grandson of the first Michael Tweedie, is noted as the author of the Tweedie family history in 1902. Another descendant of the first Michael Tweedie was the naturalist Michael Tweedie, director of the Raffles Museum in Singapore.

Another Tweedie line, which is closely connected to Oliver, stems from Alexander Tweedie (died 1740) of Nether Minzion via his son James. James’ son Alexander Tweedie (1759–1811) moved to Dreva, and his son James Tweedie of Coates gave rise to families in Scotland and Chicago. A second son Thomas Tweedie (1760–1848) moved to Patavan and also had widely dispersed descendants.

Several others with the name Tweedie, identified in Peebles, surrounding areas of Peebleshire and Edinburgh up to the 19th century are most likely offshoots of the Tweed valley family.

Arms of George Twedy – Visitation of Essex

=== Tweedy of Essex, The Hoo, Kempston, and Widmore Lodge ===
The branch descends from a George Twedye, born c. 1430, who was recorded in the Herald's Visitation of Essex 1558 and 1612 as coming "owt of Scotland frome a howse called Dromelzane". His arms were noted as Quarterly 1st & 4th Argent a saltire engrailed Gules a Chief Azure (for Twedye); 2nd & 3rd Azure a Cross pattee ermine between 3 Cinquefoils Or, (for Fraser) – a heraldic reference to the Tweedie connection with the Frasers. George's exact relationship to the Tweedies of Drummelzier has not been established. His great grandson, William Twedy, died in 1605 and is buried at Little Sampford, Essex. His memorial describes him as a distinguished military commander first under Queen Elizabeth of glorious memory in suppressing the tumults of the north of England, next under the invincible hero the Lord Baron de Willoughby in France, and lastly under the auspices of the illustrious Earl of Leicester, in the Netherlands, and was Warden of the military works at Bergen-op-Zoom.

The family remained in Essex until the 16th century, when it moved to Yorkshire before returning to the South of England in the 18th century. The family was centred on Bromley, Kent. Colonel George Tweedy HEIC lived at Bromley House, John Newman Tweedy lived at Widmore House and his son, Arthur Hearne Tweedy, at Widmore Lodge. The family's connection with Bromley is commemorated by the naming of Tweedy Road in the centre of the town.

Arthur Hearne Tweedy died in 1925 unmarried, and the family is now represented by Captain Christopher John Tweedy, late of the Black Watch.

=== Other branches ===
In addition to the Tweedie families listed above, Michael Forbes Tweedie recorded the following pedigrees in his book The History of the Tweedie or Tweedy Family:

The Descendants Of The Rev. William King Tweedie, D.D.
Tweedy Of Cornwall.
Tweedie Of New Brunswick.
Tweedy Of Cloonamahon.
Tweedie In Quothquan, co.Sligo, Ireland.
Alexander Leslie Tweedie.
Tweedie in Dreva and Minzon, and of Coats
Alexander Gladstone Tweedie.
Tweedie From Lindores.
Andrew Tweedie in Edinburgh
Tweedie in Broughton Mains

== See also ==
- Tweedie
- Tweedy

== Tartan ==
- Tartan: There is no registered tartan for this clan, but the Fraser tartan may be worn.

== Heraldry ==
As at 2017 nine Tweedie/Tweedy Coats of Arms have been registered at the Lyon Court, Edinburgh
