= William Tweedie =

- Born: 31 October 1836; Edinburgh
- Died: 18 September 1914 (aged 77)
- Burial place: Lettrick, Dunscore
- Military career
- Allegiance: United Kingdom
- Branch: British Army
- Rank: Major-General
- Conflicts: Indian Mutiny; Abyssinia Expedition; Second Anglo-Afghan War
- Awards: CSI

William Tweedie CSI (1836–1914) was a soldier, diplomat and author, who served in India, Abyssinia and Turkish Arabia. The son of Reverend and author William King Tweedie, he is also known as the author of a book on the Arabian horse.

== Early life ==
He was born in Scotland on 31 October 1836, the eldest of five children of William King Tweedie and Margaret Tweedie (née Bell). Tweedie's younger brother, John, served in the Indian Civil Service, progressing to Postmaster General of Bengal.

After graduating from St Andrews College, Edinburgh as a Doctor of Divinity, Tweedie joined the army of the East India Company at the age of 21.

== Military and diplomatic service ==
After enlisting as a Cadet, Tweedie was promoted to Ensign shortly after arrival in India. The Indian Mutiny had begun soon after Tweedie's arrival, and he soon saw action, being severely wounded in the shoulder in the action at Benares on 4 June 1858. Upon recovery, Tweedie volunteered for service with the 78th Highlanders, taking part in the action at Bithur and the First relief of Lucknow.

Gazetted Lieutenant in April 1858, Tweedie would then serve with Beatson's Horse before being appointed Adjutant of the 3rd Cavalry at Hyderabad which led to further promotions, being appointed 2nd Assistant Resident of Hyderabad and 1st Assistant General Superintendent of Thagi and Darcy in 1863 and magistrate and judge at Secunderabad in 1866.

In November 1867 Tweedie was named as Political Secretary to Lt. Gen Sir Robert Napier, who was leading the Abyssinia Expedition, serving throughout the campaign and twice being mentioned in dispatches.

After resuming his career in India as 2nd Assistant Commissioner Hyderabad, Tweedie was promoted to 1st Assistant Commissioner, before returning to Britain in 1876, and marrying Emily Whitmore in 1877. Tweedie was then named as Resident at Mandalay, with this promotion later cancelled before he could take up the position. At the outbreak of the Second Anglo-Afghan War, Tweedie was appointed as Political Staff Officer to Major-General Robert Bright, before being appointed as Political Agent 1st Class Eastern States (Rajputana). Tweedie was then appointed as Resident of Turkish Arabia in Baghdad in 1881, a role which involved inspecting all aspects of local life, including the trade in Arabian horses which he was especially interested in. He was named as a Companion of the Order of the Star of India in March 1885.

== Writing ==
Tweedie had his treatise on Arabian horses, 'The Arabian Horse, His Country and His People', published in 1894 by William Blackwood & Sons.

== Later life, death and funeral ==
After retiring to Scotland, Tweedie purchased property in Dunscore, where he built a Manor House costing £23,000. He died in 1914, shortly after the outbreak of World War I having left detailed instructions for his funeral. With no heirs and his wife Emily having died in 1912, his estate was left to Edinburgh University.
