= Peel tower =

Small medieval fortified keep or tower house

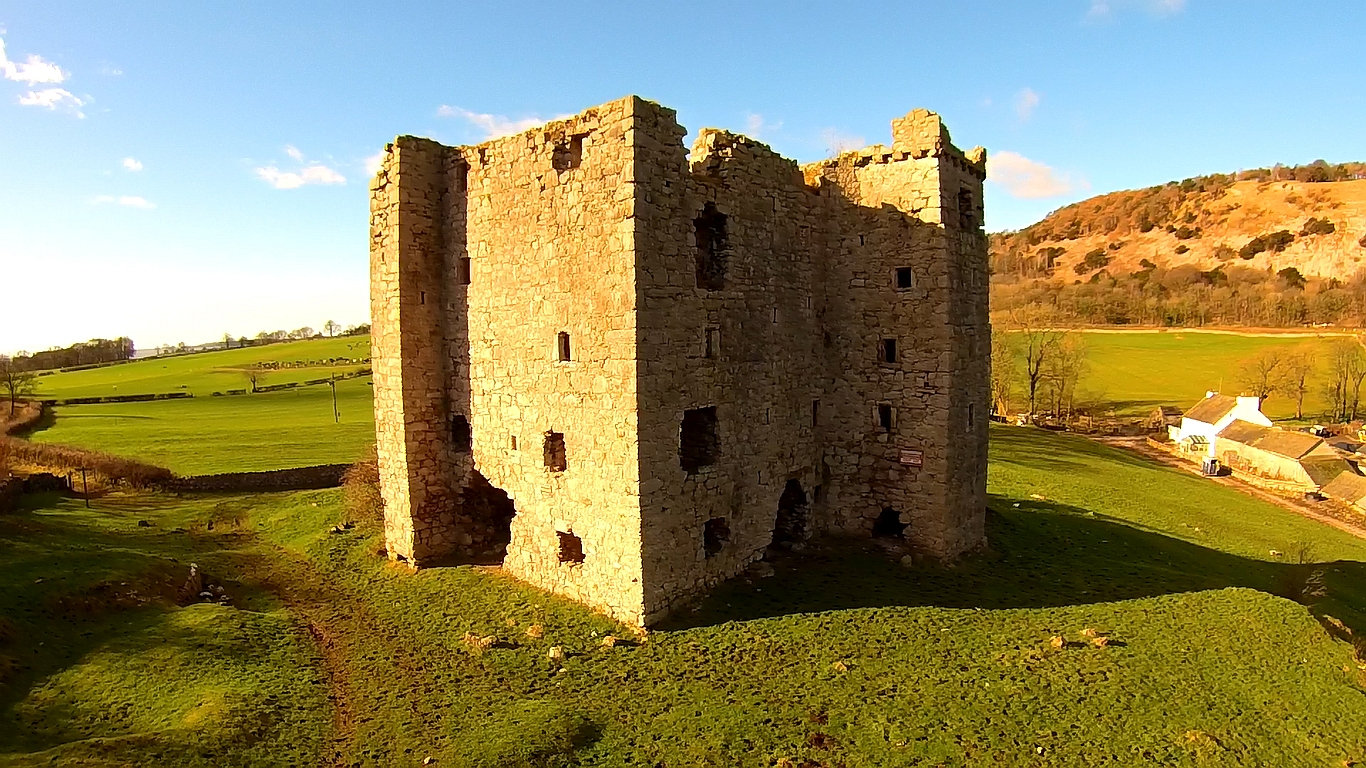
Arnside Tower, a late-medieval pele tower in Cumbria

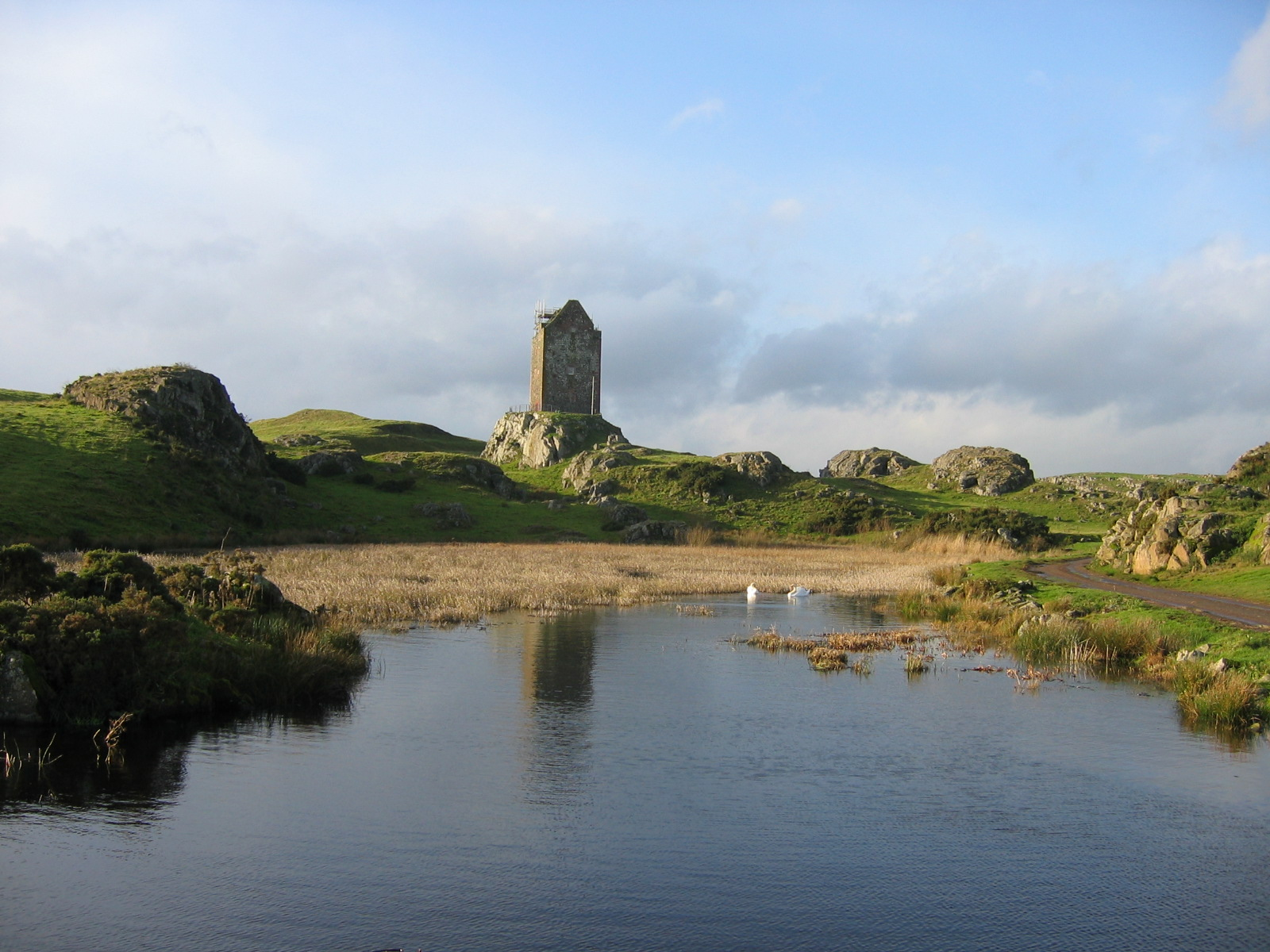
Smailholm Tower near Kelso in Scotland

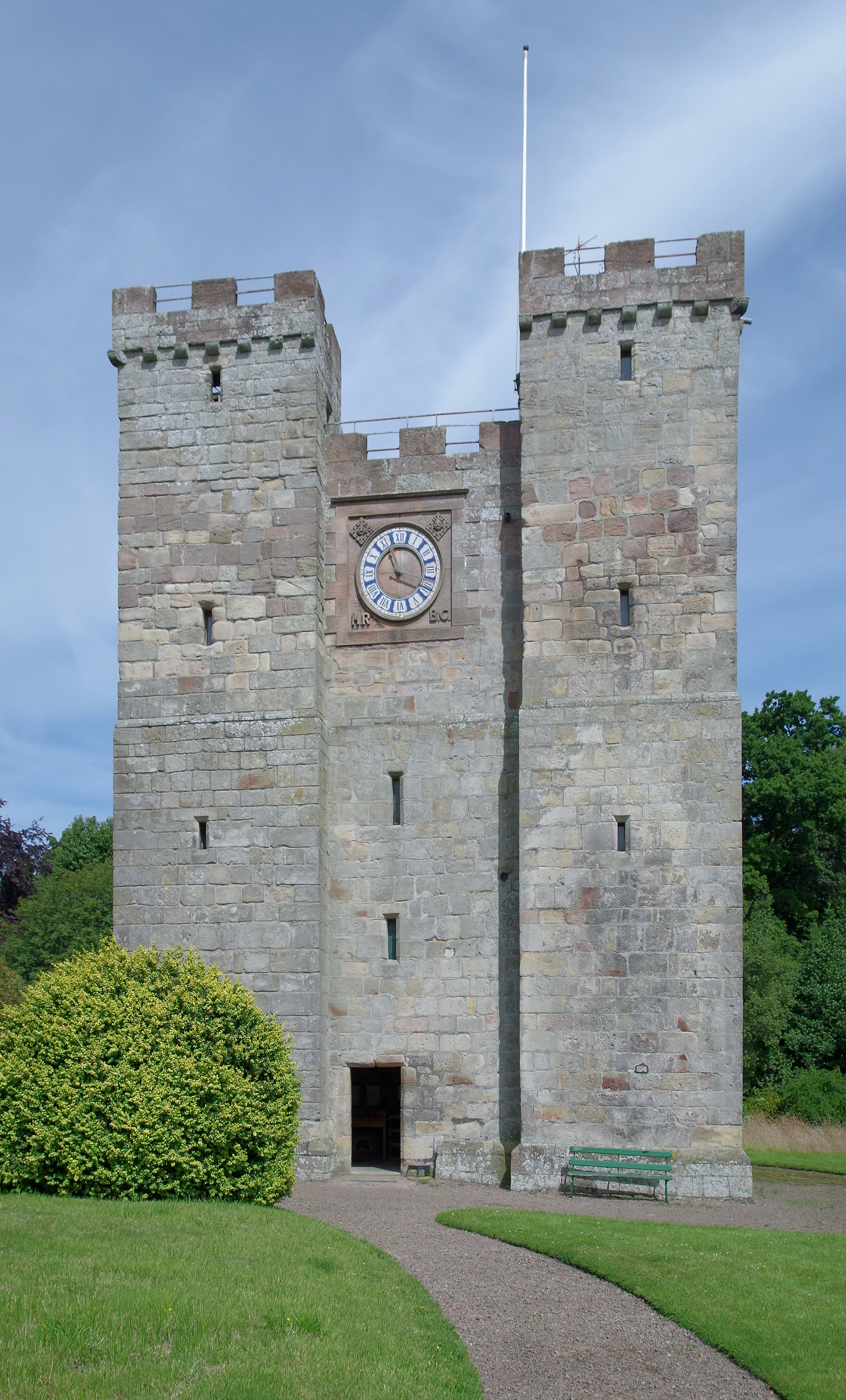
Preston Tower, Northumberland

Peel towers (also spelt pele) are small fortified keeps or tower houses, built along the English and Scottish borders in the Scottish Marches and North of England, mainly between the mid-14th century and about 1600. They were free-standing with defence being a prime consideration in their design, although "confirmation of status and prestige" also played a role. Additionally, they functioned as watch-towers, where garrisoned personnel could light signal fires to warn of approaching danger.

The FISH Vocabulary Monument Types Thesaurus lists "pele" alongside "bastle", "fortified manor house" and "tower house" under the broader term "fortified house". Pevsner defines a peel as simply a stone tower. Outside of this, "peel" or "pele" can also be used in related contexts, for example a "pele" or "barmkin" (in Ireland a bawn) was an enclosure where livestock were herded in times of danger. The rustling of livestock was an inevitable part of Border raids, and often their main purpose. In this usage, the tower usually stood at a corner of the pele. Most pele enclosure walls have not survived, and some towers perhaps never had them. Some, known as a "vicar's pele", housed the local vicar but could also serve as a refuge for the whole community.

== History ==
Peels were built in Scotland, Northumberland, Cumberland, Westmorland, County Durham, the North Riding of Yorkshire, and as far south as Lancashire, in response to the threat of attack from the English, Scots and the Border Reivers of both nationalities.

In Scotland, a line of these towers was built in the 1430s across the Tweed valley from Berwick to its source, as a response to the dangers of invasion from the Marches. In the upper Tweed valley, going downstream from its source, they were as follows: Fruid, Hawkshaw, Oliver, Polmood, Kingledoors, Mossfennan, Wrae Tower, Quarter, Stanhope, Drumelzier, Tinnies, Dreva, Stobo, Dawyck, Easter Happrew, Lyne, Barnes, Caverhill, Neidpath, Peebles, Horsburgh, Nether Horsburgh Castle, Cardrona, Kirna (Kirnie), Elibank.

By an Act of the Parliament of England in 1455, each of these towers was required to have an iron basket on its summit and a smoke or fire signal, for day or night use, ready at hand. Apart from their primary purpose as a warning system, these towers were also the homes of the lairds and landlords of the area, who dwelt in them with their families and retainers, while their followers lived in simple huts outside the walls. The towers also provided a refuge so that, when cross-border raiding parties arrived, the whole population of a village could take to the tower and wait for the marauders to depart.

== Surviving towers ==
Embleton Tower (formerly Embleton Vicarage) in Northumberland; the square medieval pele tower is at right

Pele towers can be associated with a church: for example Embleton Tower in Embleton, Northumberland, and another at Church of St Michael, Alnham, are examples of a so-called 'vicar's peles' and the one at Hulne Priory near Alnwick is in the grounds of the priory. Corbridge Vicar's Pele in Northumberland has been converted to a small pub. St Michael's Church, Burgh by Sands has a heavily fortified tower at the west end and a former vicar's pele at the east end. St Cuthbert's, Great Salkeld, is another example of a fortified church. Both these Cumbrian churches have yetts or strong internal iron gates to defend their towers against Scottish raiders.

Some peles were converted to castles, such as Penrith Castle. Some towers are now derelict while others have been converted for use in peacetime. Embleton pele tower was part of the former vicarage, now a private home, and that on the Inner Farne is a home to bird wardens. The most obvious conversion needs include access, which would have originally been made intentionally difficult, and the provision of more and larger windows. Hellifield Peel Castle in Hellifield, North Yorkshire featured in an episode of Grand Designs showing the conversion from a derelict state to a home and a bed-and-breakfast business. Darnick Tower stands just outside Melrose and is still habitable. It was built in 1425 by the Heiton family from Normandy, and remained the property of the same family until 2016. The Pele Tower in Whittingham, Northumberland was converted to alms houses in 1864, but is now a single dwelling, rentable as holiday accommodation. The lower barrel vaulted chamber and first floor date from c. 1280, the top floor from the Victorian reconstruction. Another renovated tower can be found at Cresswell, in the village of the same name on Druridge Bay, Northumberland.

Canons Ashby House incorporates one of only a few pele towers constructed in the Midlands; it owes its existence to the settlement of Cumbrian sheep farmer, John Dryden, in the county of Northamptonshire.

== See also ==
- Architecture in early modern Scotland#Vernacular architecture (section)
- Bastle house
- Category:Fortified church buildings in England
- Manor house
- Scottish Vernacular
- Tower houses in Britain and Ireland
- Vernacular architecture
