= William King Tweedie =

Scottish historian (1803–1863)

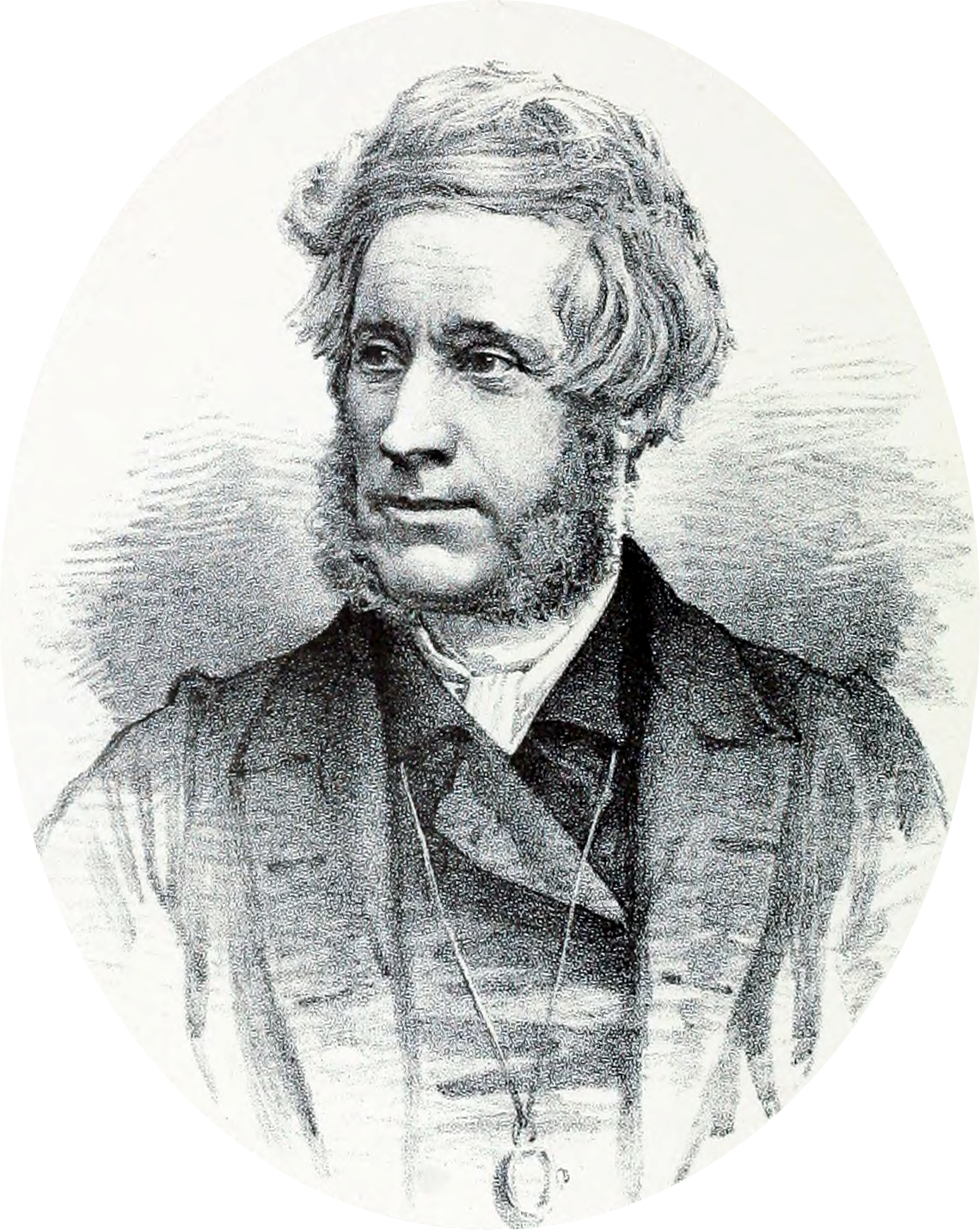
- William King Tweedie from Disruption Worthies

Personal details
- Born: 8 May 1803
- Died: 24 March 1863 (aged 59)

convener of the Free Church Sustentation Fund
- In office 1845–1847

convener of the Free Church Foreign Mission Committee
- In office 1848–1862

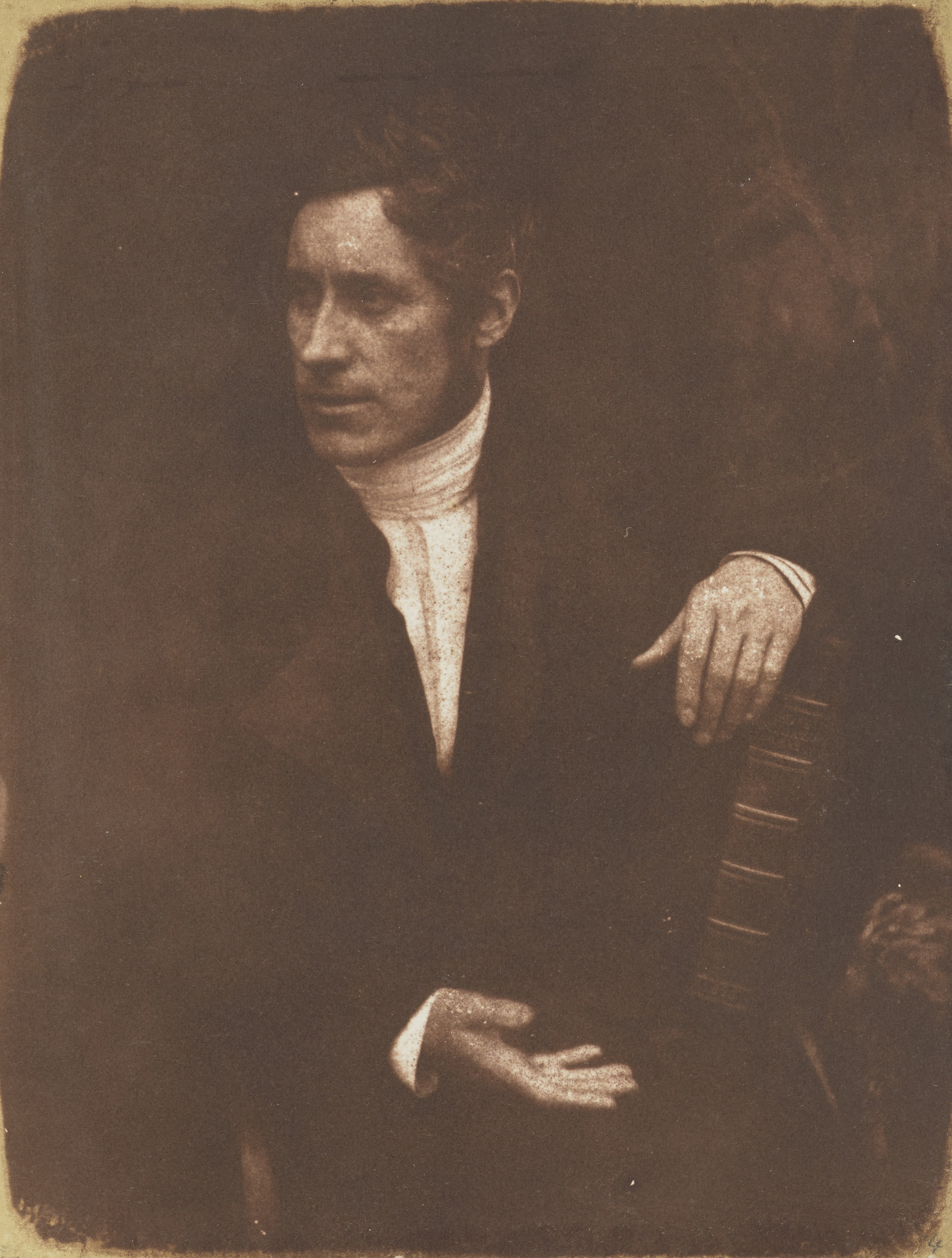
William King Tweedie by Hill & Adamson

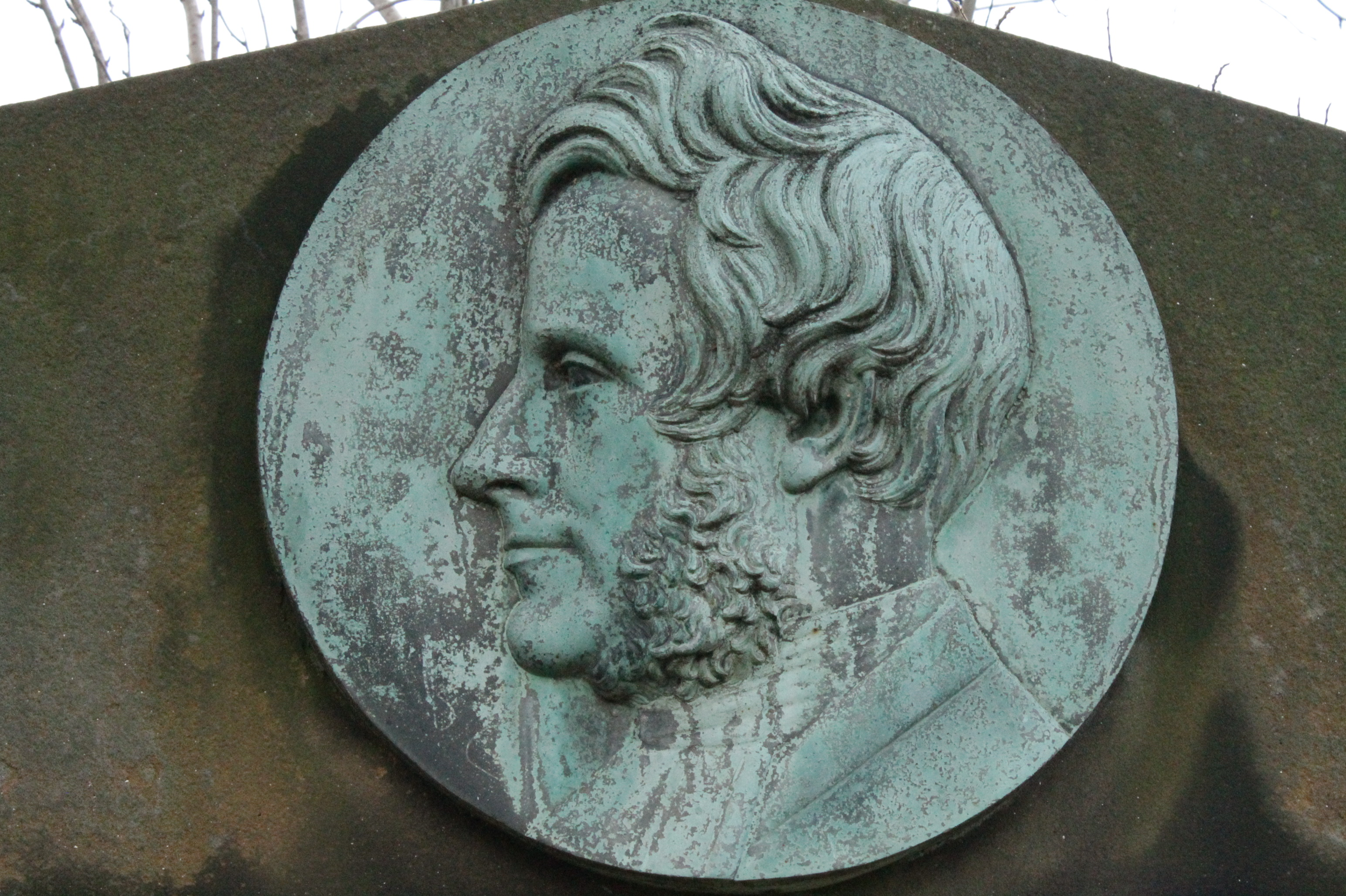
Relief of Tweedie

William King Tweedie (1803–1863) was an historian, biographer and a minister of the Free Church of Scotland Tolbooth Church, Edinburgh.

== Life ==
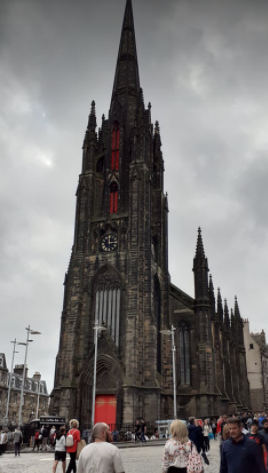
Former Tolbooth Church, Castlehill, Edinburgh

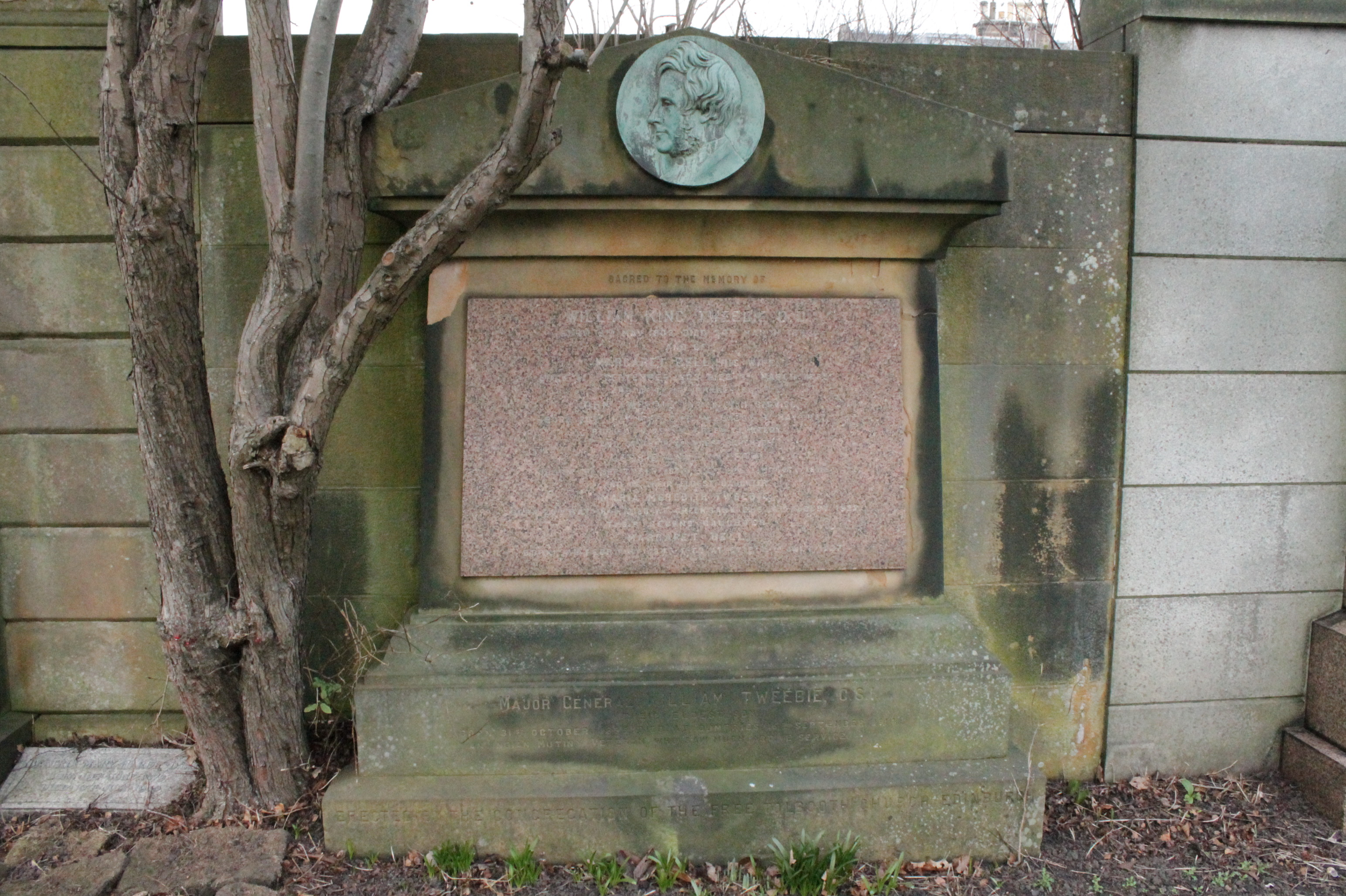
The grave of Rev William King Tweedie, Grange Cemetery

He was born in Ayr on 8 May 1803 to John Tweedie and Janet King. His parents moved to Buenos Aires in South America while William was young and he was left in the care of an aunt in Maybole. He never saw his parents again, and was effectively abandoned.

He studied Divinity at Edinburgh, Glasgow and St Andrews University. He was licensed to preach as a minister of the Church of Scotland by the Presbytery of Arbroath in 1828.

He was ordained as minister of the Scots Church at London Wall in 1832. In 1836, Tweedie was appointed minister of Aberdeen South Parish and later in 1842, the Tolbooth Church in Edinburgh, replacing Rev. Thomas Randall Davidson. The Tolbooth Church, designed by James Gillespie Graham and Pugin, had recently been completed. He left the established church in the Disruption of 1843 and was thereafter a minister of the Free Church of Scotland.

Leaving with a large portion of the Tolbooth parish congregation, they purchased the pre-existing Secession Church on Infirmary Street. He lived at 50 George Square, Edinburgh.

From 1848 to 1862, he was Convenor of the Foreign Mission Committee of the Free Church. He was awarded an honorary Doctor of Divinity by St Andrews University in 1852.

He moved to 3 Fingal Place in the Grange around 1845 but returned to George Square in later life.

The church sold the Infirmary Street church in 1851 and used temporary accommodation until a new church was built circa 1855: a very modest hall on the rear garden of an unfinished Georgian house on the north side of St Andrew Square.

He died at 15 George Square, Edinburgh on 24 March 1863. He was buried in the Grange Cemetery in south Edinburgh. The grave lies on the outer north wall.

== Family ==
On 11 May 1835, he married Margaret Bell (1803-3 March 1885) in London. She was daughter of Hugh Bell, of Old Garphar, Straiton, Ayrshire, and had five children.

Their children included:

- Major General William Tweedie of Lettrick (31 October 1836 - 18 September 1914). Major-General, C.S.I., served in Indian Mutiny Sepoy mutiny, held numerous military and political appointments in India, Political Resident in Turkish Arabia, and H.M. Consul-General at Baghdad.
- John Tweedie (1838-1897) of the Bengal Civil Service born 30 July 1838 - died 3 May 1897
- Maria Meredith Tweedie (born 20 May 1841)
- Margaret Bell Tweedie (4 November 1843)
- Jessie Ann Tweedie (born 17 September 1845)

== Publications ==
- Life of Rev John MacDonald, India
- Calvin and Servetus
- Lights and Shadows of the Life of Faith
- Jerusalem and its Environs
- Ruined Cities of the East
- Fifteen Years of Foreign Missions
- The Life and Work of Earnest Men
- The Sacrament of Baptism
- Seed Time and Harvest: or Sow Well and Reap Well. A Book for the Young. Preface by H. L. Hastings
- Home: A Book for the Family
- Pathways of Many Pilgrims; or, Lights and Shadows in the Christian Life
- Glad Tidings; or the Gospel of Peace. A series of meditations for Christian Disciples. Preface by H. L. Hastings
- A Lamp to the Path: or the Word of God in the Heart, the Home, the Workshop and the Market-place. Introduction by H. L. Hastings
- Of the Free Tolbooth Church, Edinburgh
