= Charles Tweedie =

Scottish mathematician and mathematical historian

Charles Tweedie FRSE (27 June 1868 – 14 September 1925) was a Scottish mathematician and mathematical historian.

== Life ==
Tweedie was born in Swinton on 27 June 1868, the son of Charlotte Lugton (1836–1909) and George Tweedie (1837–1905) a schoolmaster originally from Cleish. He was from a large family, and his older brother, David Tweedie (b. 1865), was also a mathematician, who worked mainly in Egypt.

He was educated at Swinton Parish School and then George Watson's College in Edinburgh. He won the Sibbald Scholarship to study mathematics and physics at the University of Edinburgh. Here he was trusted enough by Professor George Chrystal to assist with the editing of Chrystal's textbook on algebra. Tweedie graduated with an MA BSc with honours in 1890. He won the Bruce of Grangehill Bursary which allowed him to undertake postgraduate study at the University of Göttingen 1890/91 and University of Berlin 1891/92.

In the autumn of 1892 he became an assistant in the mathematics department at the University of Edinburgh under Professor Chrystal and became an official soon after, as Chrystal's right-hand man.

He was elected a Fellow of the Royal Society of Edinburgh in 1897. His proposers were George Chrystal, Peter Guthrie Tait, Cargill Gilston Knott and John Sturgeon Mackay. He was President of the Edinburgh Mathematical Society 1903–1904.

He died in Edinburgh on 14 September 1925. He was unmarried and had no children.

== Publications ==
- A Study of the Life and Writings of Colin Maclaurin (1915)
- The Geometrica Organica of Colin Maclaurin (1916)
- James Stirling: A Sketch of his Life and Work (1922)
- Notes on James Gray (1924)
