= Dreva on Tweed =

Hamlet in Scottish Borders, Scotland

Coordinates: 55°36′33″N 3°22′00″W

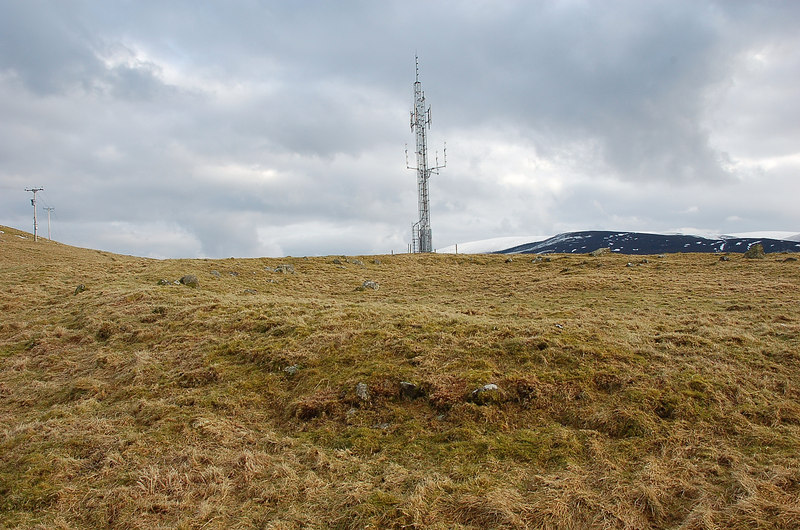
The communication mast and ancient settlement site, Dreva

Dreva on Tweed (or simply Dreva) is a hamlet in the Scottish Borders. It was historically in Peebles-shire.

It is noted for the historical presence of a Peel tower.

== Etymology ==
The name is first attested quite late, in 1649, as Draway. This seems to be a Cumbric name, perhaps cognate with Welsh (y) + tref + ma 'the place of the (fortified) farmstead'.
