= Drumelzier =

Village in Scottish Borders, Scotland

Coordinates: 55.5939°N 3.3726°W

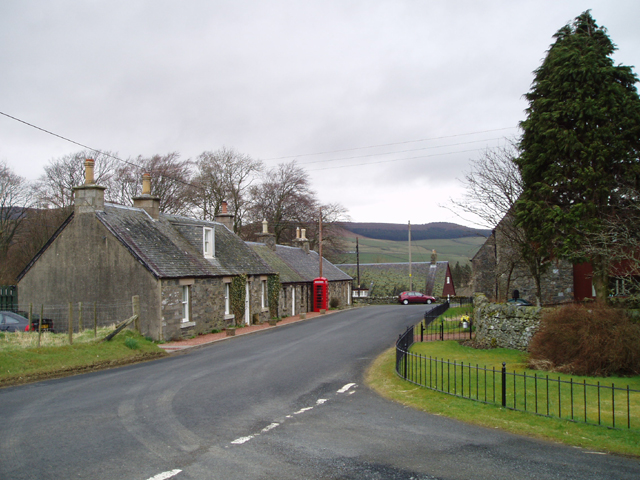
Drumelzier village

Drumelzier (/drəˈmɛljər/), is a village and civil parish on the B712 in the Tweed Valley in the Scottish Borders.

The area of the village is extensive and includes the settlements of Stanhope and Kingledoors. To the north is Broughton and to the south the road passes Crook Inn to Tweedsmuir. Powsail Burn (also called Drumelzier Burn) runs through Drumelzier to become a tributary of the River Tweed. Stobo Castle hotel and health spa are in the area, as is Dawyck Botanic Garden, one of three "Regional Gardens" of the Royal Botanic Garden Edinburgh.

== History ==
=== Toponymy ===
The name is recorded as Dunmedler (circa 1200); Dumelliare (1305); Drummeiller (1326); Drummelzare (1492) and Drummelzier (1790). The name may derive from the Gaelic for 'bare hill'. Alternatively, it has been suggested that the village may be named after Meldred, a sixth-century petty king or chieftain who features in literary accounts of post-Roman Britain and may have had his power base at Tinnis Castle.

Drumelzier is pronounced /drəˈmɛljər/. This is due to the original Scots spelling, Drumelȝier, containing the letter yogh, which was later erroneously confused with the tailed z.

=== The castles ===
==== Drumelzier ====
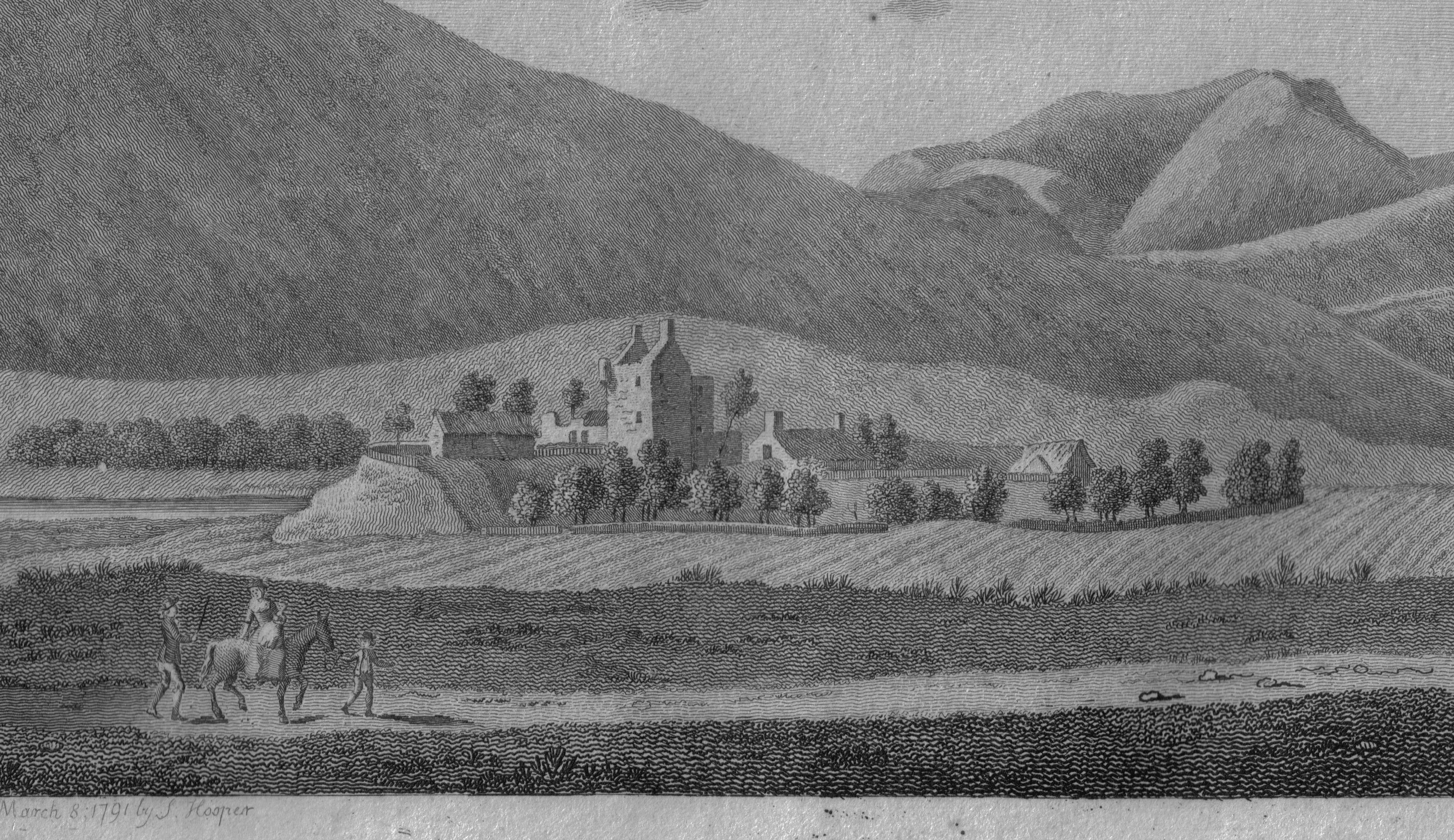
Drumelzier Castle in 1790.

The village takes its name from Drumelzier Castle, located hard by the River Tweed not far from the village centre. It was the ancient seat of the Tweedie family, first chartered to Roger de Twydyn about 1320. It was also part of a chain of peel towers along the Tweed Valley. The ruins of the old house are now in the midst of modern farm buildings, which have been built largely of stone salvaged from it. The fortunes of the Tweedie family declined, and in 1633 the last Tweedie of Drummelzier was forced to sell the Barony of Drummelzier to Lord Hay of Yester. The present Laird of Drumelzier is Alexander Hay of Duns and Drumelzier, he resides at Duns Castle, Berwickshire.

The Castle was abandoned and as a ruin became a convenient quarry for building stone for the farm its ruins now stand in; the square south tower stood at its original height as late as 1972. The remains have since been mainly demolished and the site cleared on the grounds of safety; only the rubble-filled stump of the tower now remains.

==== Tinnis ====
Above the village is a distinctive conical hill, known as 'Tennis, Tinnis or Tinnie's Castle', a name derived from 'Thanes Castle'. Only a few walls of the old fortalice remained when it was visited by Francis Grose in 1790; it was used as a redoubt or citadel by the Lords of Tweedie and passed to the Hays family by marriage.

The castle probably dates from the late 15th or early 16th centuries and may have been built by the Tweedies of nearby Drumelzier. The remains indicate a rectangular castle with curtain-walls that enclosed a courtyard with a tower-house at the south corner; circular towers were located at the north and west angles.

An anonymous 17th-century account indicates that Tinnis Castle was blown up by Malcolm Fleming, 3rd Lord Fleming in the course of an ongoing feud between the Flemings and the Tweedies of Drumelzier. However, in 1592 James VI ordered the demolition of "Tynneis" belonging to James Stewart, with Harden and Dryhope, belonging to Walter Scott, for their part in the Earl of Bothwell's raid on Falkland Palace.

=== The murder of John Fleming, 2nd Lord Fleming ===
In 1524, John Fleming, 2nd Lord Fleming, was attacked and killed by a party of men led by John Tweedie of Drumelzier while hawking in the vicinity of the village. The feud between the Tweedies and the Flemings had its roots in Tweedie's desire to secure the marriage of Catherine Frizzel, heiress of Freud in Tweedsmuir, to his eldest son, James. Catherine may already have been married to one of Lord Fleming's illegitimate sons. Three surviving members of Fleming's party were held captive by the Tweedies until Catherine was delivered to Drumelzier. In 1530, in an attempt to resolve the dispute, the Lords of Council ruled that John Tweedie should fund a chaplaincy in Biggar to say masses for the soul of the murdered Lord Fleming.

== Merlin and Drumelzier ==
In local tradition it is here, that Merlin, the great wizard of Arthurian legend, was imprisoned inside a riverbank tree by the enchantress Morgan le Fay. Many historical sites can be found in the area, from Bronze Age forts, to medieval casts.

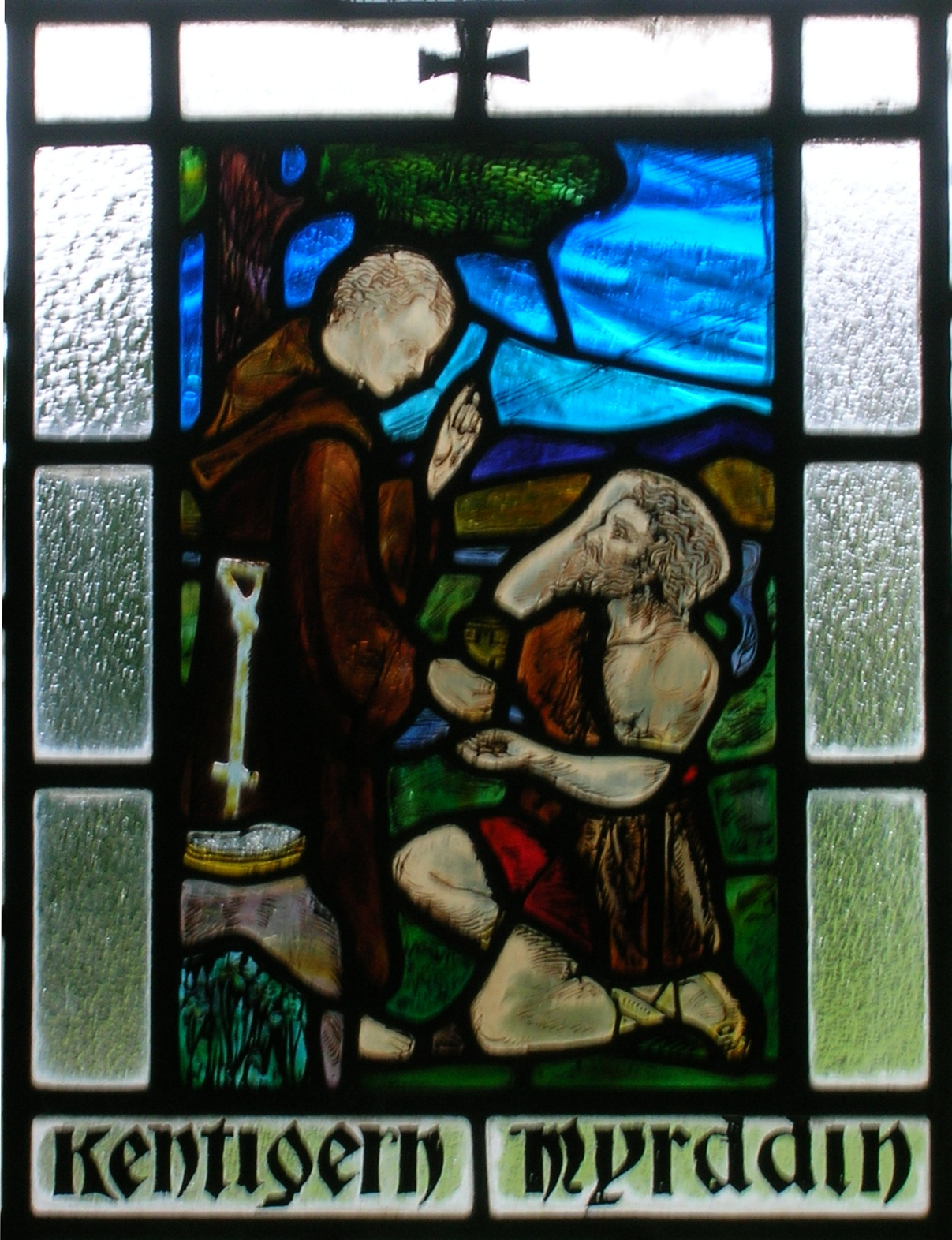
Merlin being converted to Christianity by Saint Kentigern (Mungo) at Stobo Kirk near Drumelzier

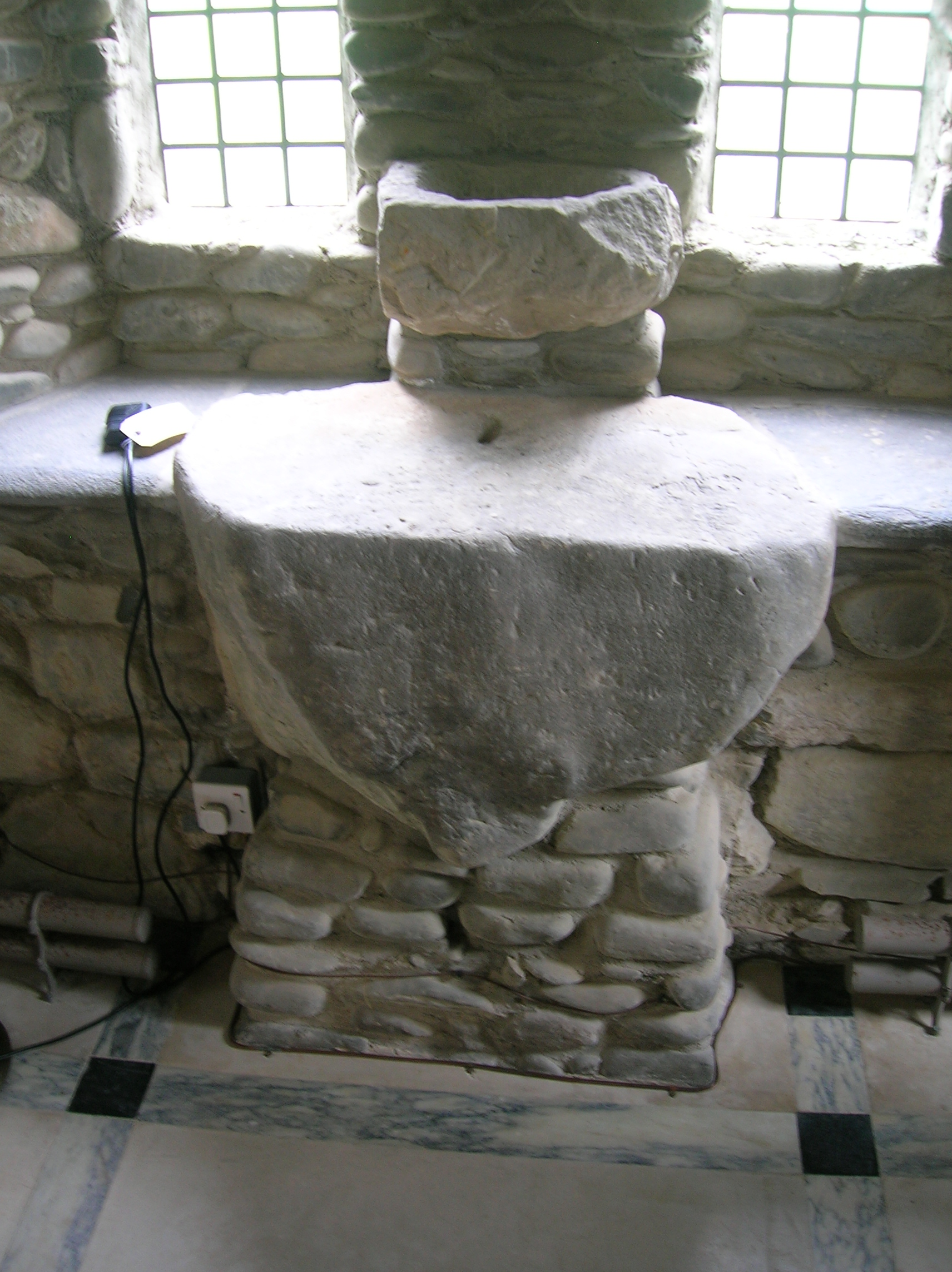
A part of 'altarstone', now in Stobo Kirk, on which Merlin was converted to Christianity.

'Myrddin Wyllt', 'Merlinus Caledonensis' or 'Merlin Sylvestris' (c. 540 – c. 584) is a figure in Brythonic medieval legends, regarded as a prophet, madman, pagan and a prototype for the composite representation of Merlin in Arthurian romance.

In Welsh legend Merlin is said to have been born in Carmarthen, South Wales, which a popular but false folk etymology claims is named after the bard; Celticist A.O.H. Jarman suggests that instead his original name Myrddin was derived from Carmarthen's Welsh name Caerfyrddin. Stories of the life of Myrddin Wyllt can be found in the Black Book of Carmarthen (1250 A.D.), written in a Brythonic Celtic language. In the Welsh tradition of his life he is said to be a wild man of the woods, prophet and Bard as written in Vita Merlini (1150).

The Merlin of the 12th century manuscript Vita Merlini Silvestris (Cotton Titus A xix) was originally called Lailoken, a warrior so traumatised by the scale of the slaughter he witnesses at the Battle of Arfderydd (Arthuret) in 573 that he retreats to the Great Wood of Caledon, where he lives as a wild man. In this tale, the captor of Lailoken is the local king Meldred. Lailoken's madness has endowed him with the gift of prophecy and Meldred holds him in his fortress at Drumeller in the hope of extracting prophecies which he can use to his advantage. During negotiations over his release, Lailoken draws attention to a leaf caught in the queen's wimple which he claims is evidence of an assignation with her lover in the king's garden. Lailoken secures his release, but the queen takes revenge on him for revealing her affair by arranging to have him ambushed and killed by a gang of shepherds.

Merlin Sylvestris was baptised and thus converted to Christianity by Saint Kentigern at the 'altarstone' near the village and is said to have died through his 'three deaths' here also. Legend has it that he prophesied his own death of falling, drowning and stabbing. It is said that he was chased off a cliff by shepherds where he tripped and fell, impaled himself on a fishing rod on the sea bed and died with his head under the water.

Meldred has Lailoken buried in the churchyard to the west of his fortress, close to where the Powsail Burn (today named Drumelzier Burn, flowing just north of Drumelzier Kirk) joins the River Tweed. Pennicuick in 1715 states that Merlin was buried a little below the churchyard at the side of the Powsail Burn. Richard Brown, a minister of the parish, showed Pennicuick the exact spot, marked by a thorn tree. A prophecy is stated :

"When Tweed and Powsail meet at Merlin's grave,
Scotland and England shall one monarch have.

The very day that James VI of Scotland and I of England was crowned the prophecy was fulfilled, with the River Tweed bursting its banks and meeting with the Powsail Burn at Merlin's Grave, something it had not done before and has not done since.

== The Tweed river spirit ==
Celtic beliefs included the existence of river spirits and the need to appease them with sacrifices.

Tweed said to Till,
'What gars ye rin so still?'
Till said to Tweed,
'Though ye rin wi' speed,
And I rin so slaw,
Yet where ye droun ae man,
I droun twa!'.

The Tweed is wide and shallow, whilst the nearby Till is deep and narrow.

A local tradition tells of a Baron of Drumelzier returning from a long involvement in the Crusades to find his wife nursing a baby. The wife explained that one day she had been walking beside the Tweed when the river spirit appeared and ravished her. The Baron appears to have accepted the explanation; however, less convinced locals applied the nickname 'Tweedie' to the child, who became Baron Drumelzier. The family name of the Barons was Tweedie. One of the Merovingian Kings of France was supposedly conceived under similar circumstances.

== Micro history ==
As late as 1598, on the first day of May, the parishioners built Beltane fires on the local hills. On this date several parishioners were put on trial by the kirk session for carrying out this pagan act.

== See also ==
- List of places in the Scottish Borders
- List of places in Scotland

Next Peel tower upwards	Tweed Valley	Next Peel tower downwards
Wrae Tower	Drumelzier	Tinnies
