= Baldernock =

Coordinates: 55.947467°N 4.280409°W

Baldernock: Scottish Gaelic: Baile D' Earnaig
- Baldernock War Memorial and parish church

- Location within East Dunbartonshire
- Council area: East Dunbartonshire
- Lieutenancy area: Dunbartonshire
- Country: Scotland
- Sovereign state: United Kingdom
- Post town: GLASGOW
- Postcode district: G62
- Dialling code: 0141
- Police: Scotland
- Fire: Scottish
- Ambulance: Scottish
- UK Parliament: East Dunbartonshire
- Scottish Parliament: Strathkelvin and Bearsden

Baldernock (/bælˈdɜːrnək/; Scottish Gaelic: Baile D' Earnaig) meaning 'settlement of St Earnaig' (Iain Mac an Táilleir, Sabhall Mór Ostaig) is a small parish in East Dunbartonshire (formerly in Stirlingshire), Scotland, ten miles (16 km) to the north of Glasgow's city centre.

== Geography ==
The parish is approximately 12 square miles (31 km^{2}), bounded by the Campsie Fells to the north and east, the Allander Water and River Kelvin to the south, and the Pow Burn to the west. It is centred on Baldernock Parish Church, which is under the jurisdiction of the Presbytery of Dumbarton.

=== Hamlets and farms ===
It also encompasses the hamlets of Balmore, Bardowie and Barnellan.

Barnellan is a small hamlet about half a mile (700m) north of Bardowie on the road to Baldernock. The hamlet consists of a few houses and a farm, the latter of which it got its name from. The nearest primary school is Baldernock Primary School.

The parish also has a farm known as Barraston Farm, which has a nearby garden centre. Other landmarks include Bardowie Loch, Bardowie Castle, and Blairskaith.

== History ==
In 1200, Baldernock was called Bathernock or Buthirnok. By the early 18th century, it was known as Badernock. There had been a church on the present-day site for at least a century and a half. Certainly, the oldest gravestone is from 1644, and the oldest gravestone that can be deciphered is from 1665. However, by the late 18th century, the church was in severe disrepair. Thus, in 1795, a new 406-person church was built, incorporating some of the stonework of the previous church. Later, a vestry projection was added to the north side. In 1905, a railway station, called Bardowie Station, was opened, and a housing development of 500 houses was planned. However, fewer than 10 were actually built, and in 1951, the station was closed.

== See also ==
- List of places in East Dunbartonshire
- List of places in Scotland

== Bibliography ==
- Old Glasgow and Its Suburbs in Their Celtic Garb: Also, Parish of Baldernock, Kirkintilloch to Stirling, Robroyston by Neil Thomson (Aird & Coghill, 1907).
- The Story of Baldernock by Elizabeth Robertson and Willie Ure (East Dunbartonshire District Libraries, 1991).
- Baldernock – Profile of a Parish Baldernock Amenity Society, May 1974.
