= Aldessan Burn =

Stream in East Dunbartonshire, Scotland, UK, tributary of Kirk Burn

Coordinates: 55.9923°N 4.2302°W

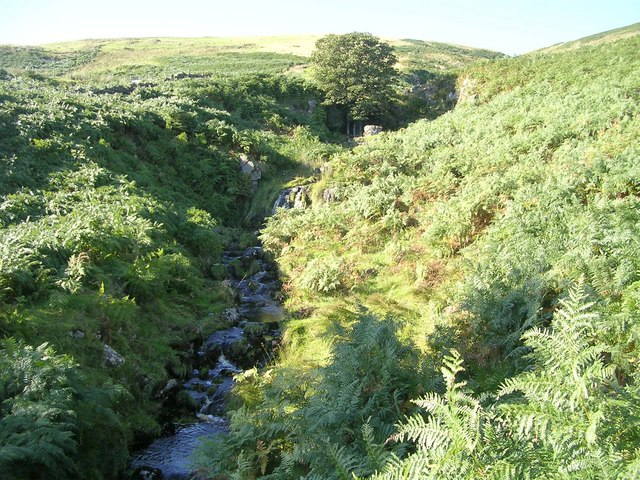
Aldessan Burn

Located in East Dunbartonshire, the Aldessan Burn (Scottish Gaelic: Allt Easain, meaning "burn of the falls"; also known as the Kirk Burn) is formed as headwaters which descend from the Campsie Fells. The Burn flows through Campsie Glen to Clachan of Campsie and upon merging with the Finglen Burn a half-mile (1 km) to the southeast, forms the Glazert Water.
