= Banton Loch =

- Townhead Reservoir
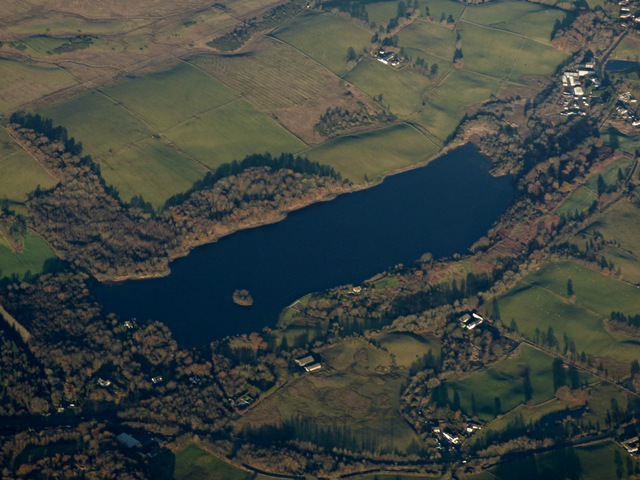
- Banton Loch from the air, seen in December 2016

- Location within the United Kingdom
- Location: North Lanarkshire
- Coordinates: 55.983422°N 4.022252°W
- Type: Canal feeder reservoir
- Primary inflows: Several burns
- Basin countries: Scotland
- Max. length: 1 kilometre (0.62 mi) approx.
- Max. width: 280 metres (920 ft) approx.

Banton Loch, also known as Kilsyth Loch, Townhead Reservoir and once nicknamed Bakers' Loch, is an artificial freshwater lake located to the east of Kilsyth, North Lanarkshire, Scotland, UK, and which supplies water to the highest stretch of the Forth and Clyde Canal.

The reservoir is widely credited as a work of John Smeaton in the 1770s and 1780s, in connection with the canal. However a history of the Glasgow Incorporation of Bakers asserts a reservoir at Townhead prior to the canal scheme, and describes Kilmannan Reservoir as a replacement for Townhead, funded by the canal company in recompense for water diverted from the River Kelvin, upon which the bakers relied to drive their mills.

== Physical geography ==
Banton Loch is a freshwater lake on the east side of Kilsyth in North Lanarkshire, Scotland, some 21 kilometres (13 mi) north-east of Glasgow. The loch is impounded by earthwork dams, situated 86 metres (282 ft) above sea level in the flooded valley of the Banton Burn, a tributary of the River Kelvin. It lies west-east, about 1 kilometre (0.62 mi) in length with a maximum width of about 280 metres (920 ft). It is fed by a number of burns draining the Kilsyth Hills to its north; the east of the loch takes inflow from Boiling Glen and Craigdouffie Burn, which meet at Meadowside and join the Banton Burn north of Low Banton; the west of the loch is fed by a lade supplied by the Garrel Burn at Garrel Mill. In turn Garrel Burn takes inflow from the Birkenburn Reservoir via Birken Burn. The loch's outflow, situated centrally on its south shoreline, feeds the Forth and Clyde canal via channels constructed for the purpose, as well as providing a source of the River Kelvin.

Colzium House and the remains of Colzium Castle are situated north-west of and overlook the loch.

== History ==
The battlefield of the 15 August 1645 Battle of Kilsyth between Scottish Royalists and Covenanters is thought to be in the vicinity of the loch, although its exact position remains a subject of debate. Ordnance Survey maps mark the battlefield as being within the loch's bounds, reflecting the creation or expansion of the loch in the 18th or 19th century.

Townhead Reservoir is described, in an 1891 history of the Incorporation of Bakers of Glasgow - a burgh guild or cartel owning the exclusive right to sell bread in Glasgow, and operator of a number of watermills on the River Kelvin - as a water-rights asset of the Incorporation acting as an impounding dam capable of providing flow on the Kelvin when low water levels would otherwise jeopardise milling operations. Duties of the Master Court of the Incorporation included regular inspection of the loch. The reservoir was popularly known as Bakers' Loch.

According to the history, upon the construction of the Forth and Clyde Canal following its parliamentary approval in 1786, and especially because of the diversion of Townhead's outflow to the canal, the Glasgow bakers stood on their rights and insisted that the canal company - as they were bound to do by law - made good the shortfall by providing a new impounded source of water. In response, in 1776, the canal company erected a reservoir at Kilmannan, about 25 kilometres (16 mi) to the west of Townhead, which feeds the Kelvin via the Allander Water. The canal company also purchased Townhead Reservoir for £3,283.

Despite this history, a number of other sources trace Townhead Reservoir back only as far as the construction of the Forth and Clyde Canal, asserting that it was constructed as part of John Smeaton's designs for the new canal, and offering construction dates of, variously, 1771-1773, 1778, and 'by 1786 it was providing the canal with 2,245 lockfuls of water annually'. The Gazetteer for Scotland states that 'the loch expanded to supply the Forth & Clyde Canal'.
