= Kelvinhead =

Coordinates: 55.98388°N 3.99413°W

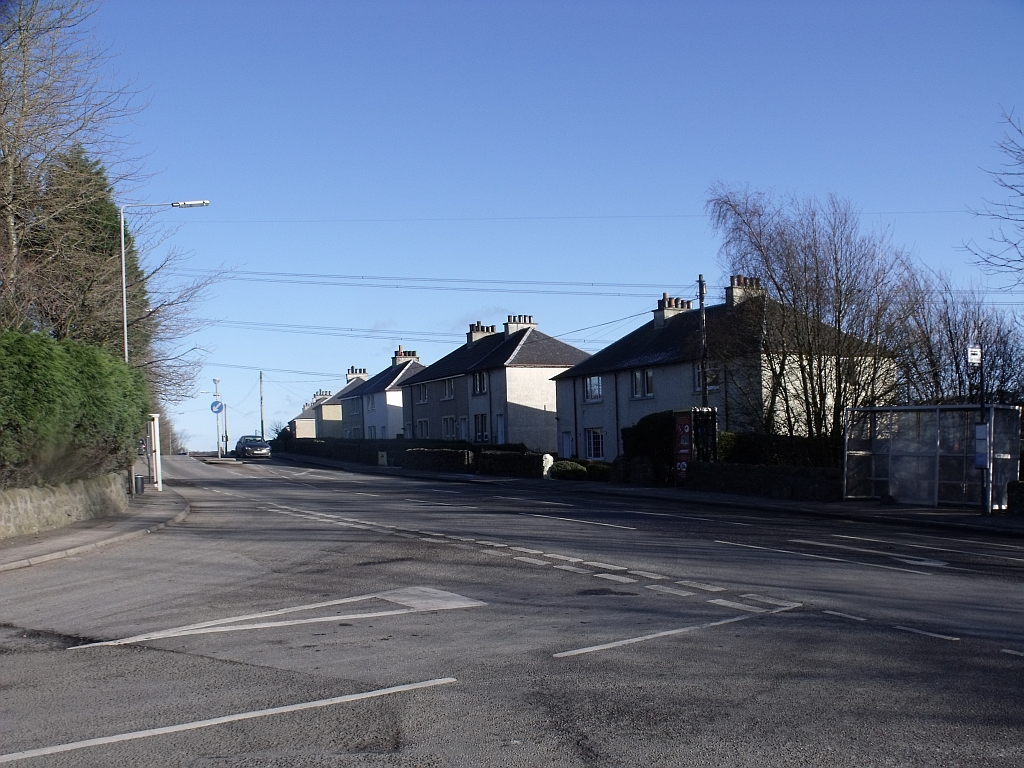
- A junction at Kelvinhead

- Location within North Lanarkshire
- Council area: North Lanarkshire
- Lieutenancy area: Dunbartonshire
- Country: Scotland
- Sovereign state: United Kingdom
- Post town: GLASGOW
- Postcode district: G65
- Dialling code: 01236
- Police: Scotland
- Fire: Scottish
- Ambulance: Scottish
- UK Parliament: Cumbernauld, Kilsyth and Kirkintilloch East
- Scottish Parliament: Cumbernauld and Kilsyth

Kelvinhead is a small hamlet in the vicinity of the village of Banton in Scotland. Located close to the source of the River Kelvin, it is little more than a collection of a few houses along the A803 road between Kilsyth and Banknock.

Kelvinhead is reputedly the site where the first crop of potatoes was grown in Scotland.

Kelvinhead is uniquely situated providing access to the Core Footpath Network in the Kelvin Valley. The Forth and Clyde canal is easily accessible which provides walking, cycling and angling. To the north there is a path to Banton Loch and the Kilsyth Hills.
