= Bardowie =

Coordinates: 55.933°N 4.269°W

Bardowie: Scottish Gaelic: Am Bàrr Dubhaidh
- Location within East Dunbartonshire
- OS grid reference: NS5873
- Council area: East Dunbartonshire
- Lieutenancy area: Dunbartonshire
- Country: Scotland
- Sovereign state: United Kingdom
- Post town: GLASGOW
- Postcode district: G62
- Dialling code: 01360
- Police: Scotland
- Fire: Scottish
- Ambulance: Scottish
- UK Parliament: East Dunbartonshire
- Scottish Parliament: Strathkelvin and Bearsden

Bardowie is a hamlet in East Dunbartonshire located within the civil parish of Baldernock. It is two miles (three kilometres) from Milngavie and four miles (six kilometres) from Strathblane. Along with other settlements in Baldernock, it was part of Stirlingshire until 1975, when Bardowie became part of the Strathclyde region. In 1996 another reorganisation placed Bardowie in East Dunbartonshire. The 1795 Richardson Thomas map of the town of Glasgow & country seven miles around refers to Bardowie as "Barduie".

== Railway ==
In 1905, a railway station, called Bardowie Station, was opened, and a housing development of 500 houses was planned. However, less than 10 were actually built, and in 1951, the station was closed.

== Dinghy Sailing Club ==
Bardowie Loch has a dinghy sailing club. The dinghy section is part of the Clyde Cruising Club.

== Points of interest ==
- Bardowie Castle
- Bardowie Loch
