= Glazert Water =

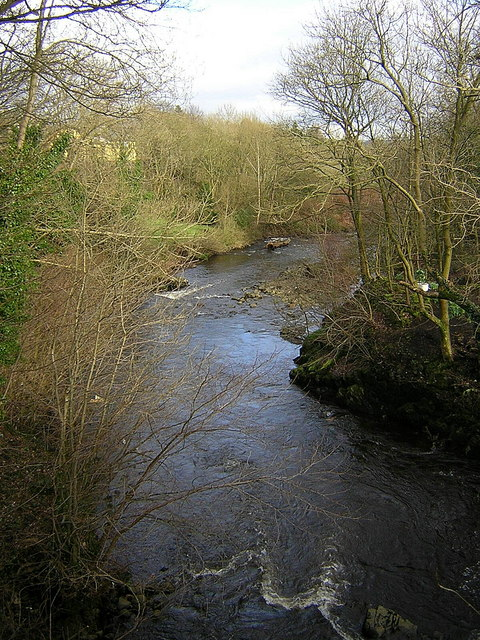
- Glazert Water, Milton of Campsie

Location
- Country: Scotland

Physical characteristics
- Source
  - location: south of Clachan of Campsie
- Mouth: River Kelvin
  - coordinates: 55.9644°N 4.1873°W

The Glazert Water is a tributary of the River Kelvin in East Dunbartonshire, Scotland. It is formed 1 kilometre (5/8 mi) south of Clachan of Campsie (55.9804°N 4.2215°W) at the junction of the Finglen Burn and the Aldessan Burn, which both descend from the Campsie Fells. The Glazert Water runs southeast for 6.5 kilometres (4 mi), flowing past both Lennoxtown and Milton of Campsie on the way, before finally joining with the much smaller River Kelvin 1 km north of Kirkintilloch (55.9467°N 4.1531°W).
