= Douglas Academy =

Coordinates: 55°56′48″N 4°20′39″W

Location
- Mains Estate; Milngavie, East Dunbartonshire, G62 7HL; Scotland

Information
- Type: State secondary school
- Motto: Neart Tre Eolas (Strength Through Knowledge)
- Established: 1967; 59 years ago
- Headteacher: Michael Healy
- Parent Council Chair: Michael Lodhi
- Staff: c. 100
- Gender: Co-educational
- Age: 11 to 18
- Enrolment: 1047 (Session 2025–26)
- Colour
- Website: www.douglas.e-dunbarton.sch.uk

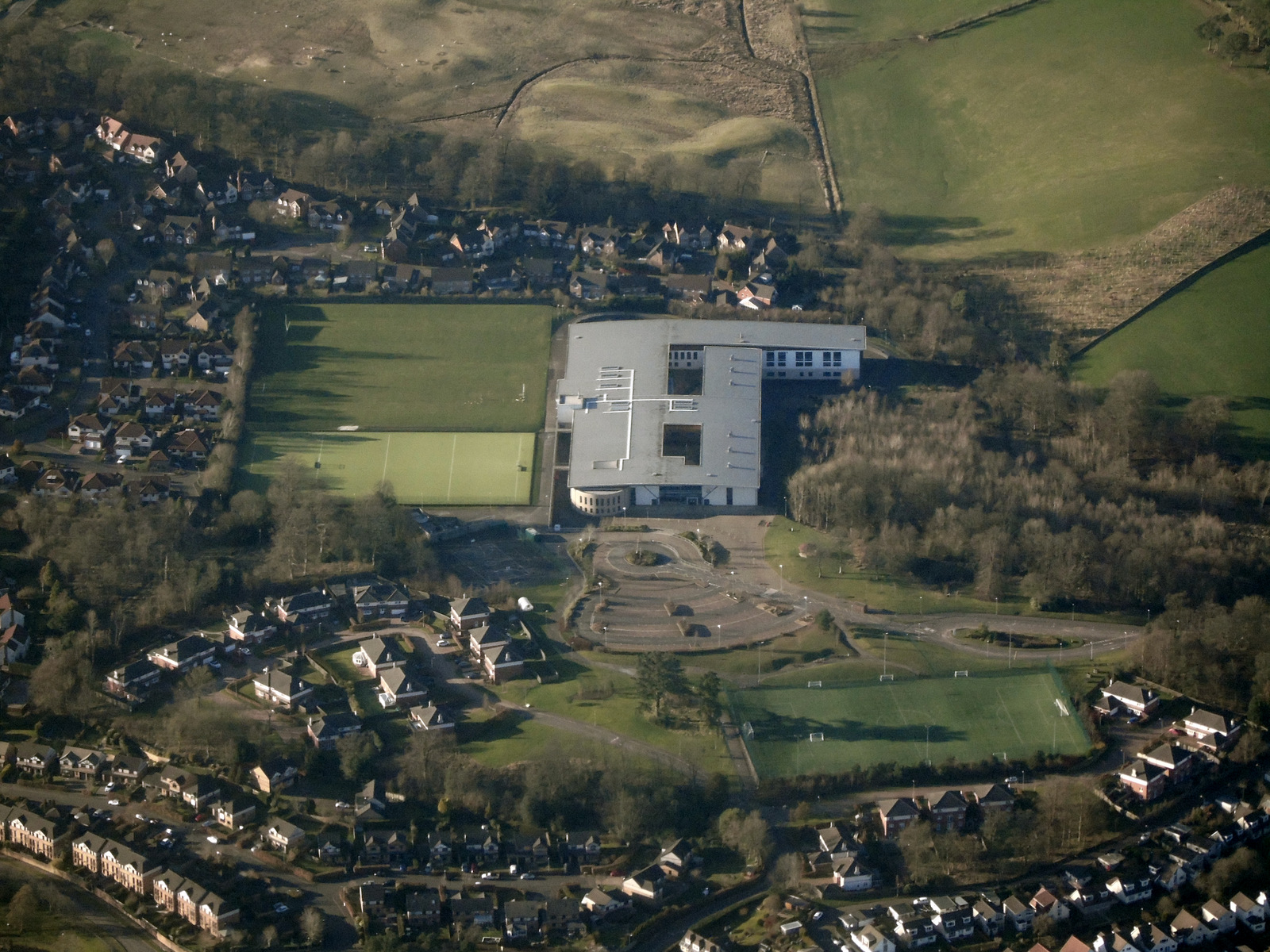
Aerial view of school and grounds (2023)

Douglas Academy is a non-denominational, co-educational, comprehensive secondary school in the town of Milngavie, East Dunbartonshire, serving the Milngavie, Craigton and Baldernock areas. In 2007, Douglas Academy was ranked as Scotland's top performing state school, and with every year the school continues to place among the highest in Scotland.

== History ==
The school is named after the Douglases of Mains, who were a branch family of the Clan Douglas. The Douglases are an ancient clan, and subsequent noble house from the Scottish Lowlands who held vast territories throughout the Scottish Borders; Angus, Lothian, Moray, and in France and Sweden. The Douglases of Mains were related to the main branch through their common ancestor Archibald I, Lord of Douglas, a Scottish medieval nobleman born in the 12th century.

The lands of the Mains, where the school is situated, were originally granted by the Earl of Lennox to Maurice Galbraith in the 13th century. The Galbraith Family held these lands until 1373, when a descendant of Lord Douglas's second son, Nicholas Douglas, married Janet Galbraith, the heiress of the Mains. Thus, the Douglas family inherited the extensive lands of the Mains, and were elevated to Lairds of the estate in the same year by King Robert II of Scotland.

The title became extinct in the 20th century; the last 33 1/2 acres (13.6 hectares) of the estate (including the house) was sold to Dunbartonshire county and was subsequently used for the erection of the secondary school, Douglas Academy, in Milngavie prior to the death of the last heir, the 21st Lord of Mains, Lieutenant Colonel Archibald Vivian Campbell Douglas in 1977.

The original school building served the site from 1967 until 2009, when it was demolished and replaced with a newer one.

=== New building ===
As part of an extensive PPP project (Public-Private Partnership) marshalled by the Scottish Government with £100 million funding, Douglas Academy has been rebuilt along with various other East Dunbartonshire schools. The new Douglas Academy building replaced the old school with a modern new look from the beginning of the 2009–2010 school year.

== Associate schools ==
- Baldernock Primary School, Baldernock
- Clober Primary School, Milngavie
- Craigdhu Primary School, Milngavie
- Milngavie Primary School, Milngavie

These schools, as associate schools, are the main "feeder" schools for Douglas Academy.

== School badge ==
The coat of arms on the school badge combines references to the school's geographical position and to the history of the grounds in which it is situated. It was designed by a student. The upper half, with its cross and roses, is part of the arms of the Burgh of Milngavie, while the lower half is the arms of Douglas of Mains, owners for many generations of the Mains Estate on which the school stands. By tradition, the heart represents the heart of Bruce, taken by a member of the Douglas family on crusade against the Moors. The Gaelic motto "Neart-Tre-Eolas" means "Strength Through Knowledge".

== Notable alumni ==
- Katie Archibald – cyclist (Olympic gold medallist)
- Greg Docherty – professional footballer
- Rob Harley – professional rugby player
- Jo Swinson – former leader of the Liberal Democrats, former MP for the local constituency
- The Ayoub Sisters – professional musicians (cello and violin)
- Russell Findlay MSP for the West Scotland Region and Leader of the Scottish Conservative and Unionist Party
