= Banton, North Lanarkshire =

Village in North Lanarkshire, Scotland

Coordinates: 55.990°N 4.006°W

Banton
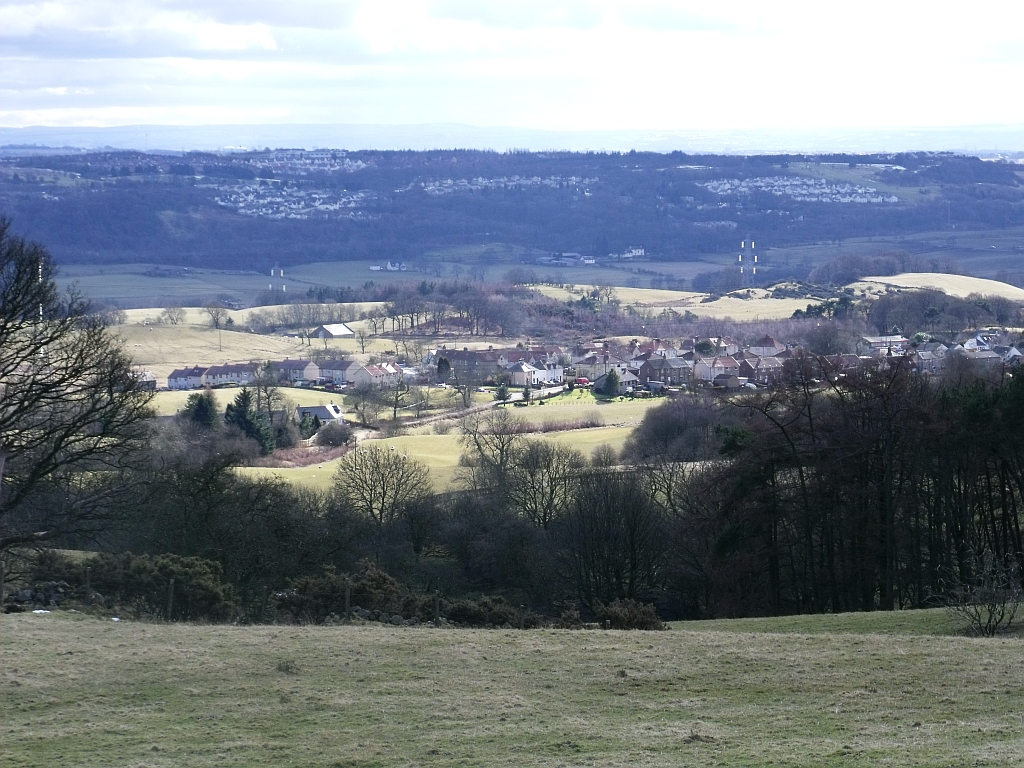
- Banton with Dullatur in the background.

- Location within North Lanarkshire
- Council area: North Lanarkshire
- Lieutenancy area: Dunbartonshire
- Country: Scotland
- Sovereign state: United Kingdom
- Post town: GLASGOW
- Postcode district: G65
- Dialling code: 01236
- Police: Scotland
- Fire: Scottish
- Ambulance: Scottish
- UK Parliament: Cumbernauld, Kilsyth and Kirkintilloch East
- Scottish Parliament: Cumbernauld and Kilsyth

Banton is a small village situated near Kilsyth in North Lanarkshire, Scotland.

== History ==
The Covenanter army under General William Baillie formed near Banton for their engagement with the Royalist forces under the command of Montrose at the Battle of Kilsyth on August 15, 1645; a major battle of the Wars of the Three Kingdoms.

In 1767, William Cadell, the original managing partner of the Carron Company, bought the Banton estate and its ironstone field. A church was built in Banton when Dr. Burns of Kilsyth encouraged Archibald Edmonstone, William Cadell, Daniel Lusk (of the paper mill) and William Campbell each to contribute 50 guineas to the scheme. The school and schoolmaster's house were built around the same time. The first preacher at the church was Mr. J. Lyon who became part of the Secession Church.

Banton originally centred on at area known today as High Banton. Farming and mining were the main historic industries. Banton, formerly called Low Banton had a "lappet & muslin manufactory". J & P Wilson's weaving mill was opened in 1839 and lasted over 100 years. It is now the headquarters of J. B. Bennett Ltd. of Glasgow who also had a 19th-century business. The coal field stretched from Croy to about 3 miles (5 km) north-east of Low Banton. Robert Rennie reported about 50 or 60 people working the mines in the 18th century. Other historical employers were a sickle work, a paper mill, and a brick and tile work. There was also a straw and mill board maker.

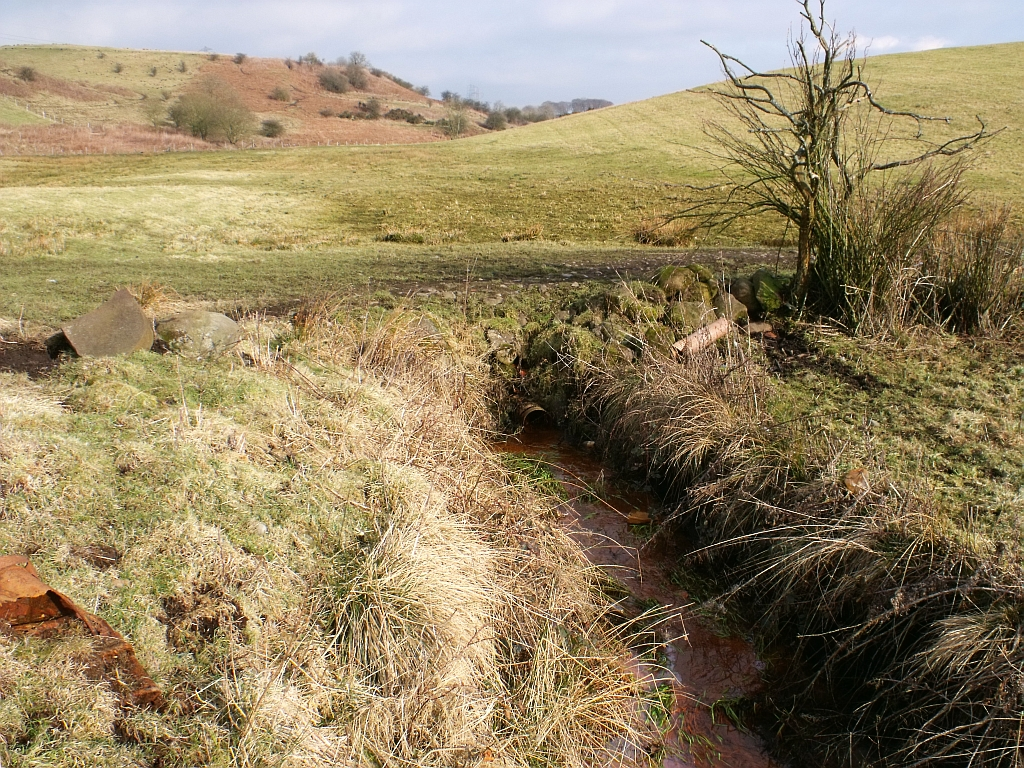
Source of the Kelvin

The Townhead Reservoir, also known as Banton Loch, is about 1 mile (2 km) west of the village. This was built in 1773 as a feeder loch for the Forth and Clyde canal. A fishing club uses the loch; previously a boating club used it too. Historically Banton had two curling clubs but the loch is only safe in the severest winters. There has been some discussion about the source of the River Kelvin. Some mention Dullatur Bog as a source. A source close to the old Lammerknowes Farm has been photographed. It is south-east corner of the village. Nearby Kelvinhead takes its name as the source of Glasgow's river which joins the Clyde at Yorkhill Basin.

== Banton today ==
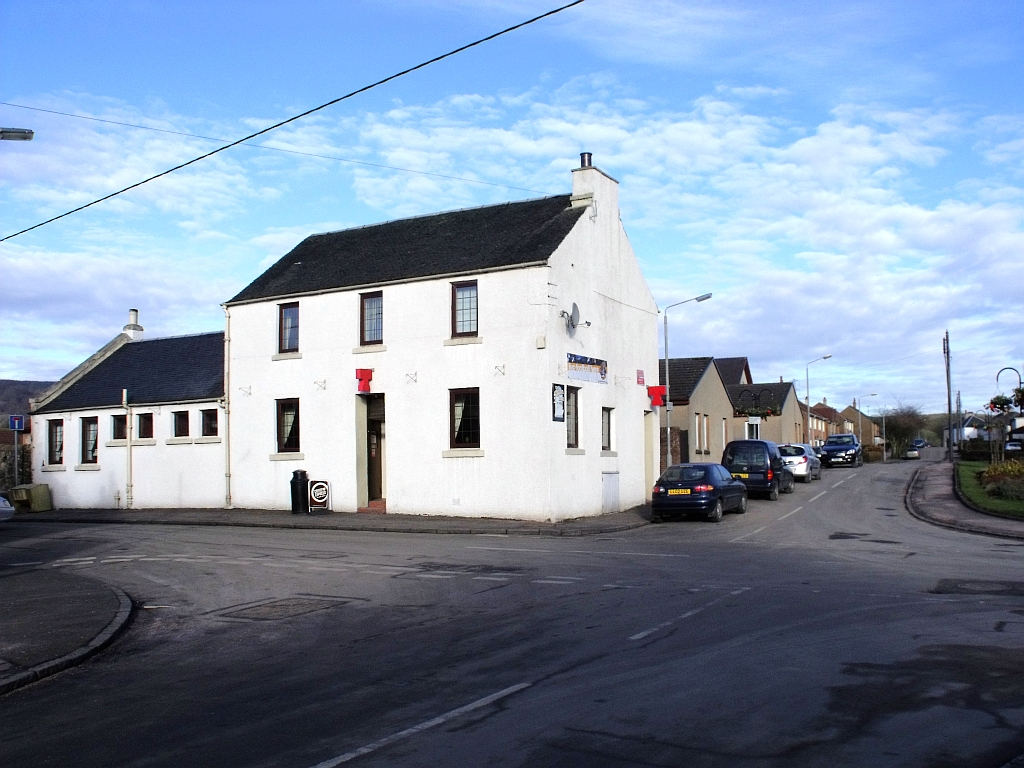
The Swan Inn, Banton Situated in the heart of the village at the Cross.

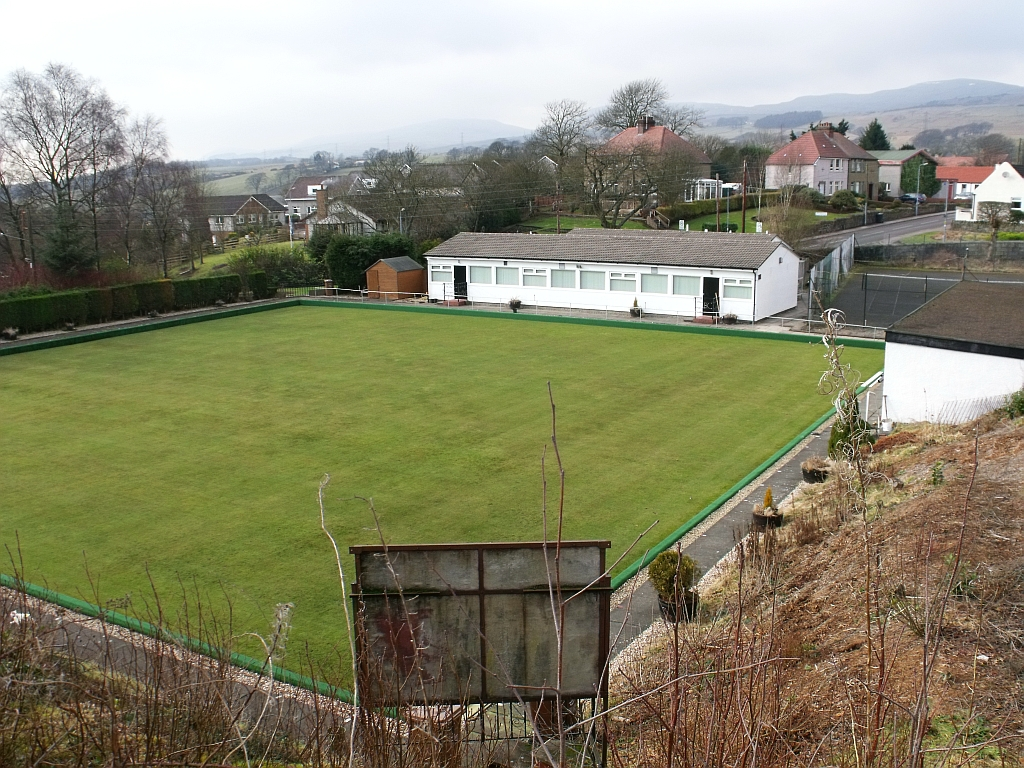
Banton Bowling Club

The village is small, with few local amenities. It had a shop until 2011, but no post office since this closed in 2010. There remains a pub-restaurant: The Swan Inn. This was bought by People United for Banton (PUB) in 2017; they also secured £740,000 National Lottery funding in 2018 to turn it into a community hub. The village also has a local primary school, a church and a bowling green. There are several businesses in the village.

The A803 runs south of the village. This allows travel to Kilsyth and Glasgow to the west and runs past Linlithgow to the east although it also provided access to the M80 at Haggs long before then. The village is about 1/2 mile (800 m) due north-west of the Kelvinhead junction.

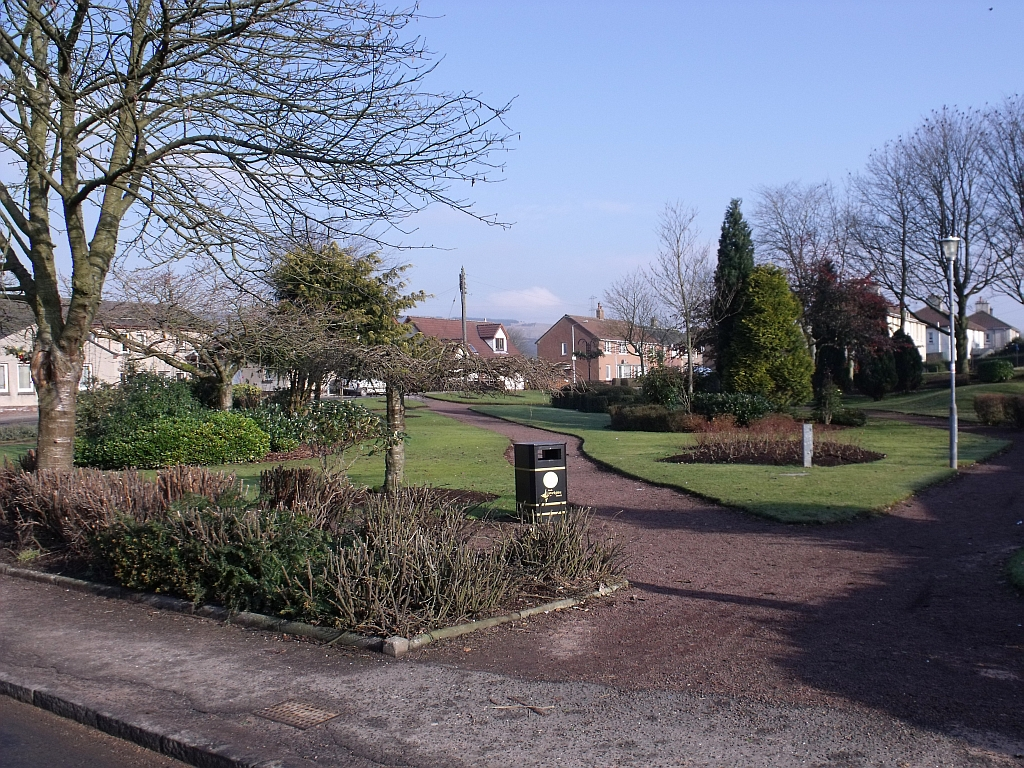
Banton Gardens

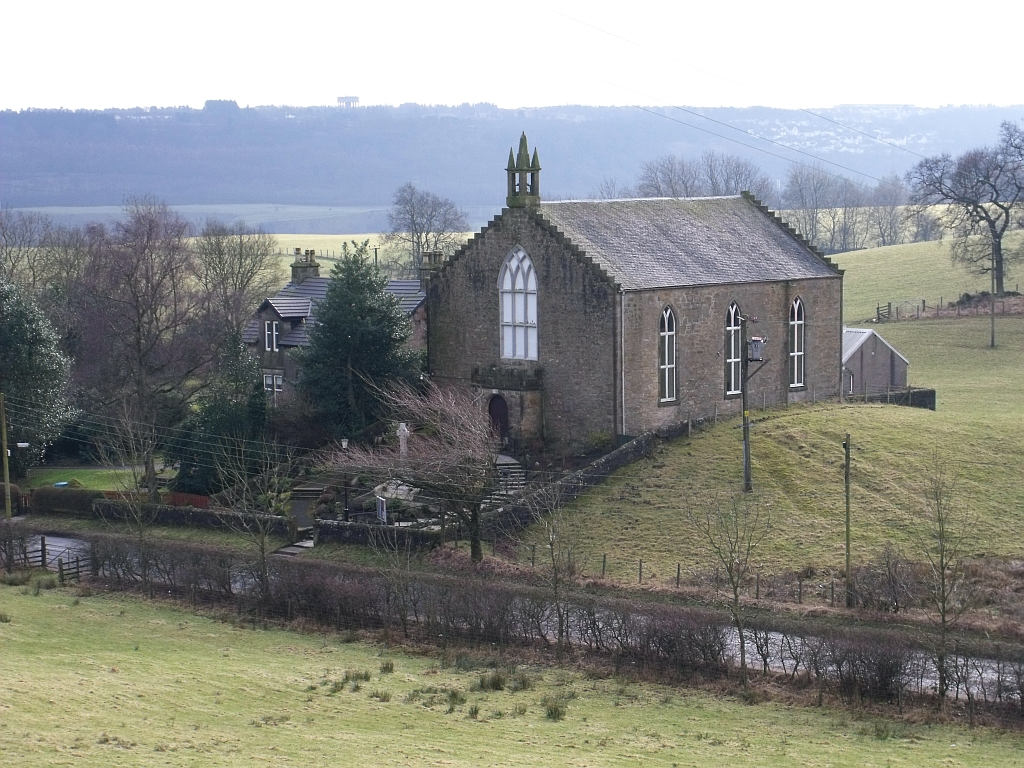
Parish Church

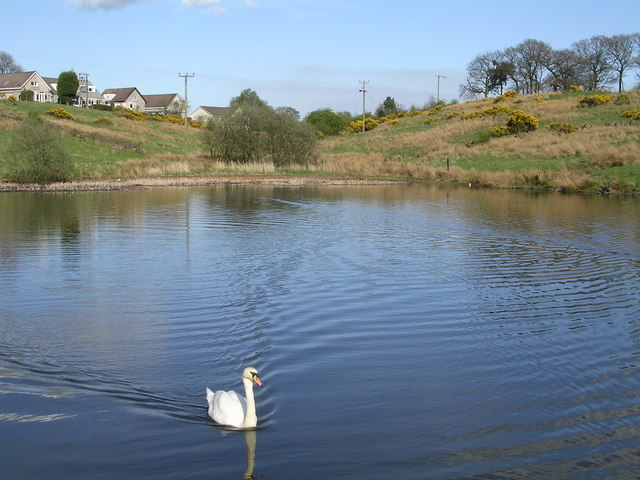
Banton Loch

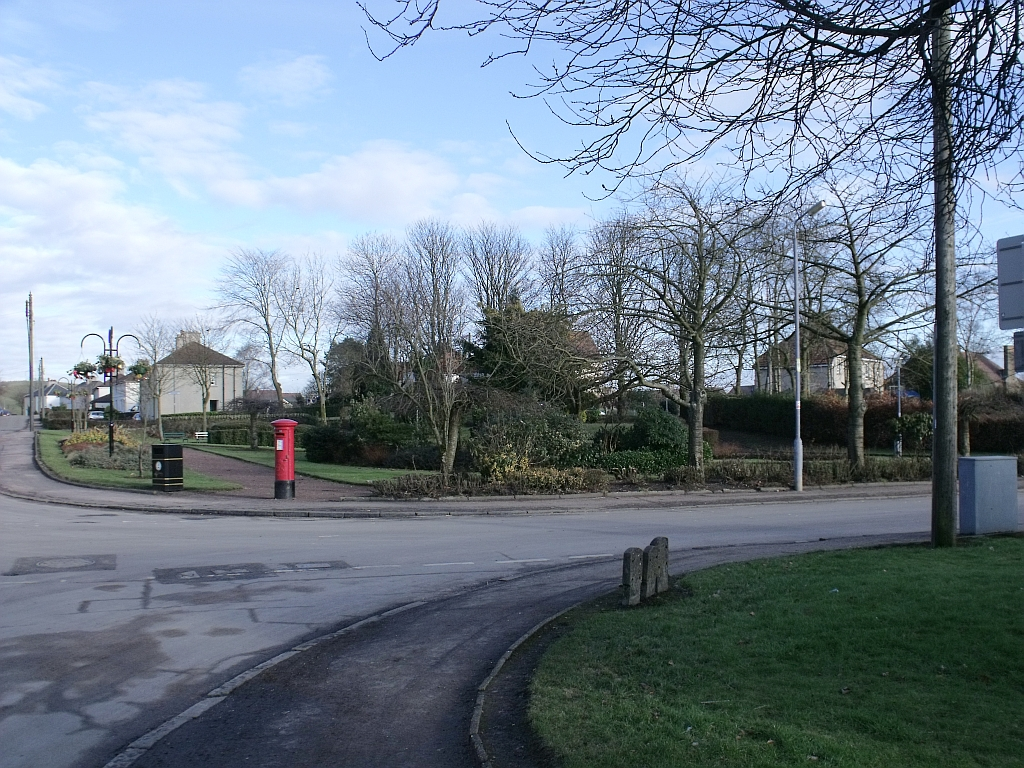
Public Park

Aerial photographs.

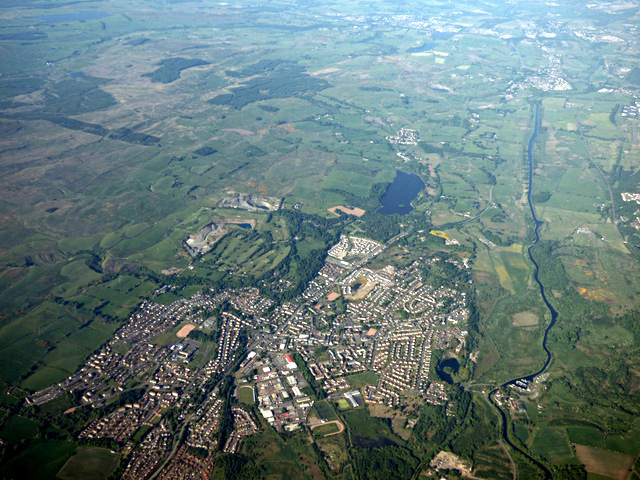
Banton above Banton Loch left of the Forth and Clyde Canal

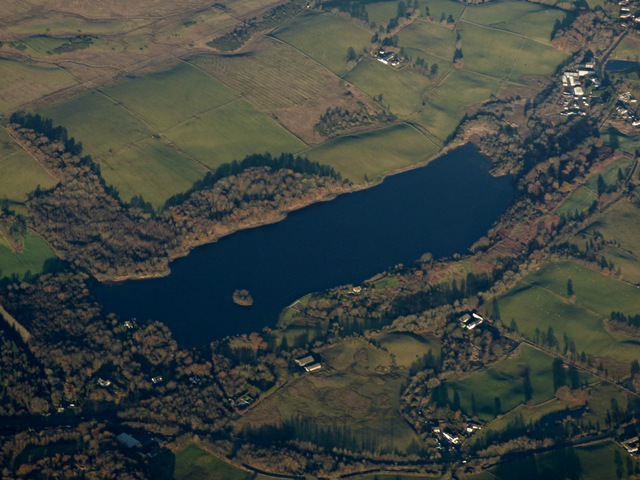
Banton Loch also known as Townhead Reservoir

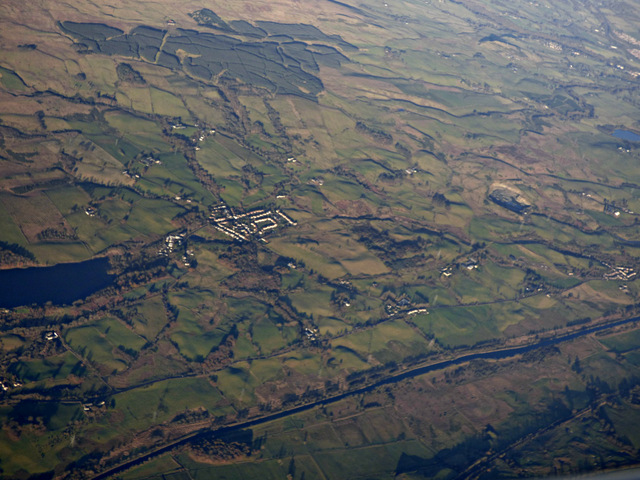
Banton in relation to the Forth & Clyde Canal
