= Allander Water =

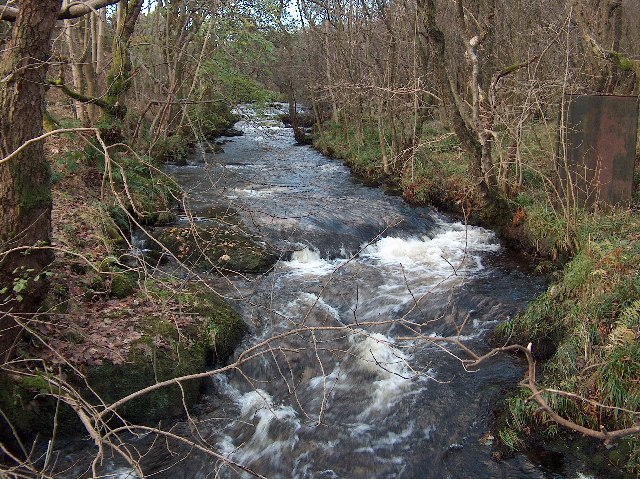
- Allander Water near Milngavie
- Native name: Uisge Alandair (Scottish Gaelic)

Location
- Country: Scotland

Physical characteristics
- Mouth: River Kelvin
  - coordinates: 55.9269°N 4.2680°W

The Allander Water (Scottish Gaelic: Uisge Alandair) is a river in East Dunbartonshire and Stirling, Scotland, and one of the three main tributaries of the River Kelvin, the others being the Glazert Water and the Luggie Water. It flows through Milngavie.

== See also ==
- List of places in East Dunbartonshire
- List of places in Stirling
