= Meikle Bin =

Peak in the Campsie Fells, Scotland

Coordinates: 56.01374°N 4.13979°W

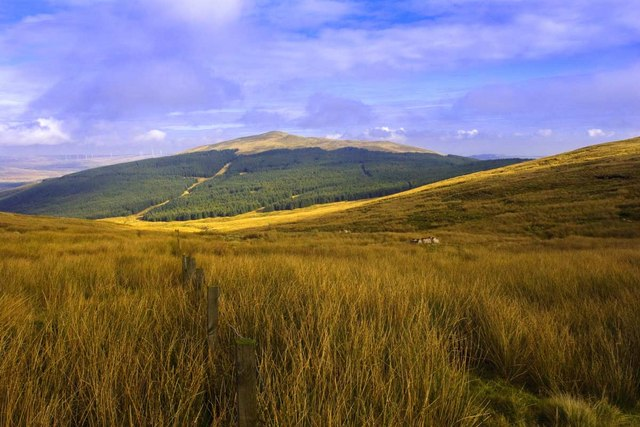
- Meikle Bin

Highest point
- Elevation: 570 m (1,870 ft)
- Prominence: 270 m (890 ft)
- Listing: Marilyn

Geography
- Location: Stirling, Scotland
- Parent range: Campsie Fells
- OS grid: NS66722822
- Topo map: OS Landranger 57, 64

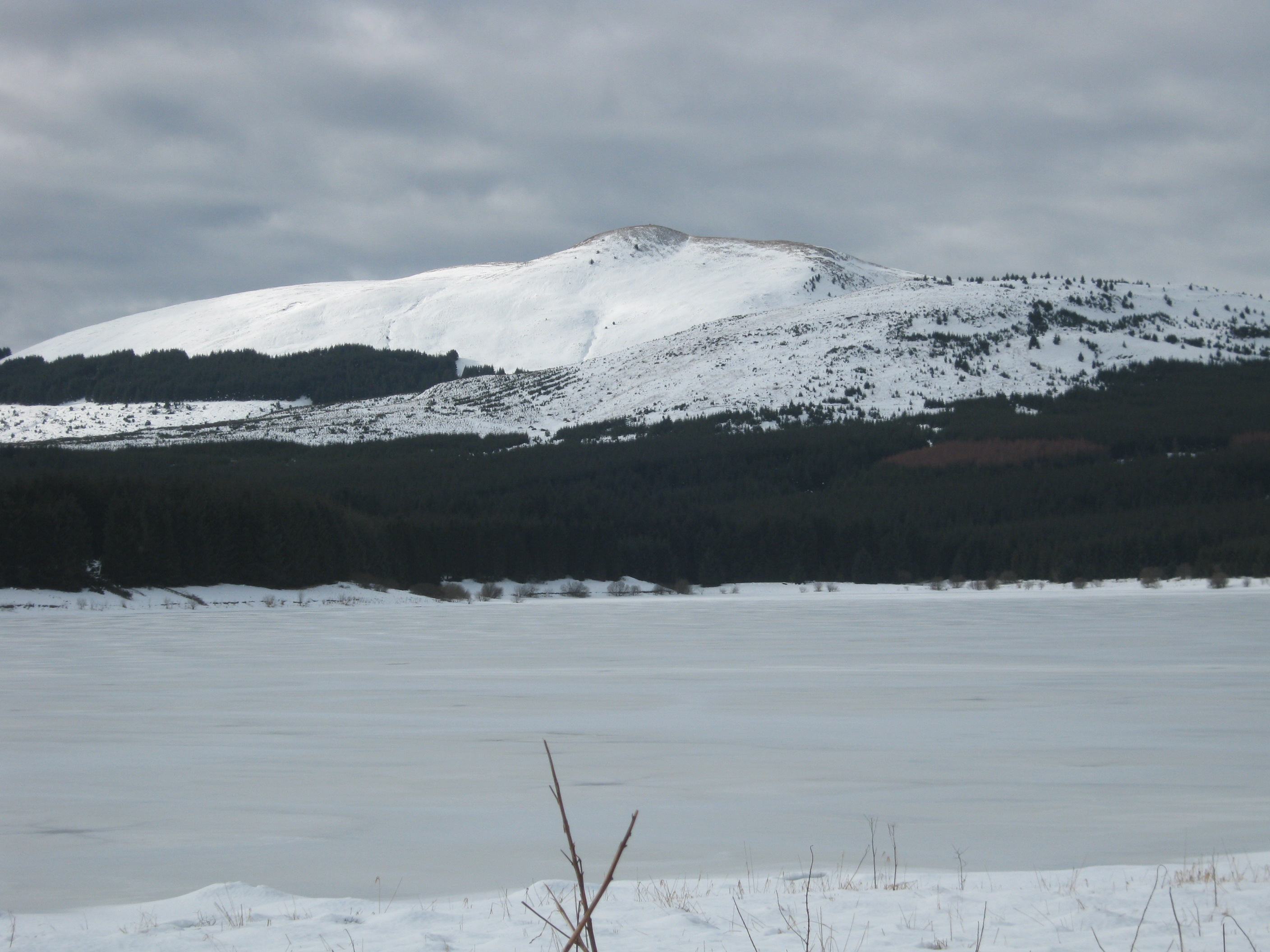
Meikle Bin beyond Carron Valley Reservoir

Meikle Bin is a peak in the Campsie Fells in Central Scotland. It is the second-highest of the group at 570 metres (1,870 ft), and with its prominence of 270 m (890 ft) it is classified as a Marilyn.

The hill is a prominent local landmark for the people of the towns surrounding the Campsie Fells. It was the site of a fatal accident in January 1950, when a Fairey Firefly of the Royal Navy Fleet Air Arm crashed just below the summit in low cloud while en route to HMS Sanderling Naval Air Station. Both crewmen were killed on impact. Wreckage can be seen on the north and west slopes.

On a clear day, Scotland's iconic east coast and west coast rock islands, Bass Rock and Ailsa Craig respectively, can be seen from the summit, a range of almost 120 miles (190 kilometres).

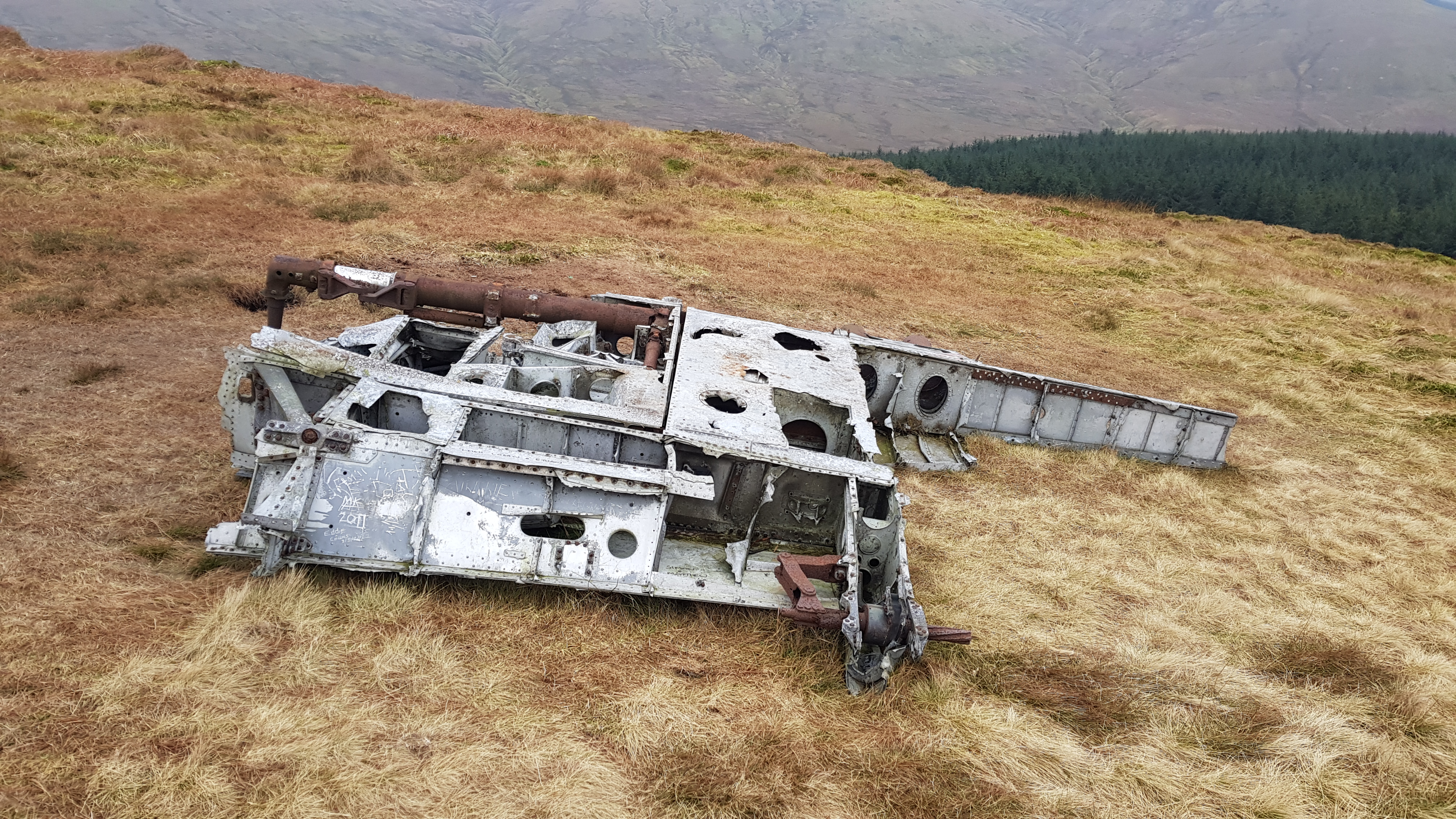
Aircraft wreckage on northwest slope, looking south

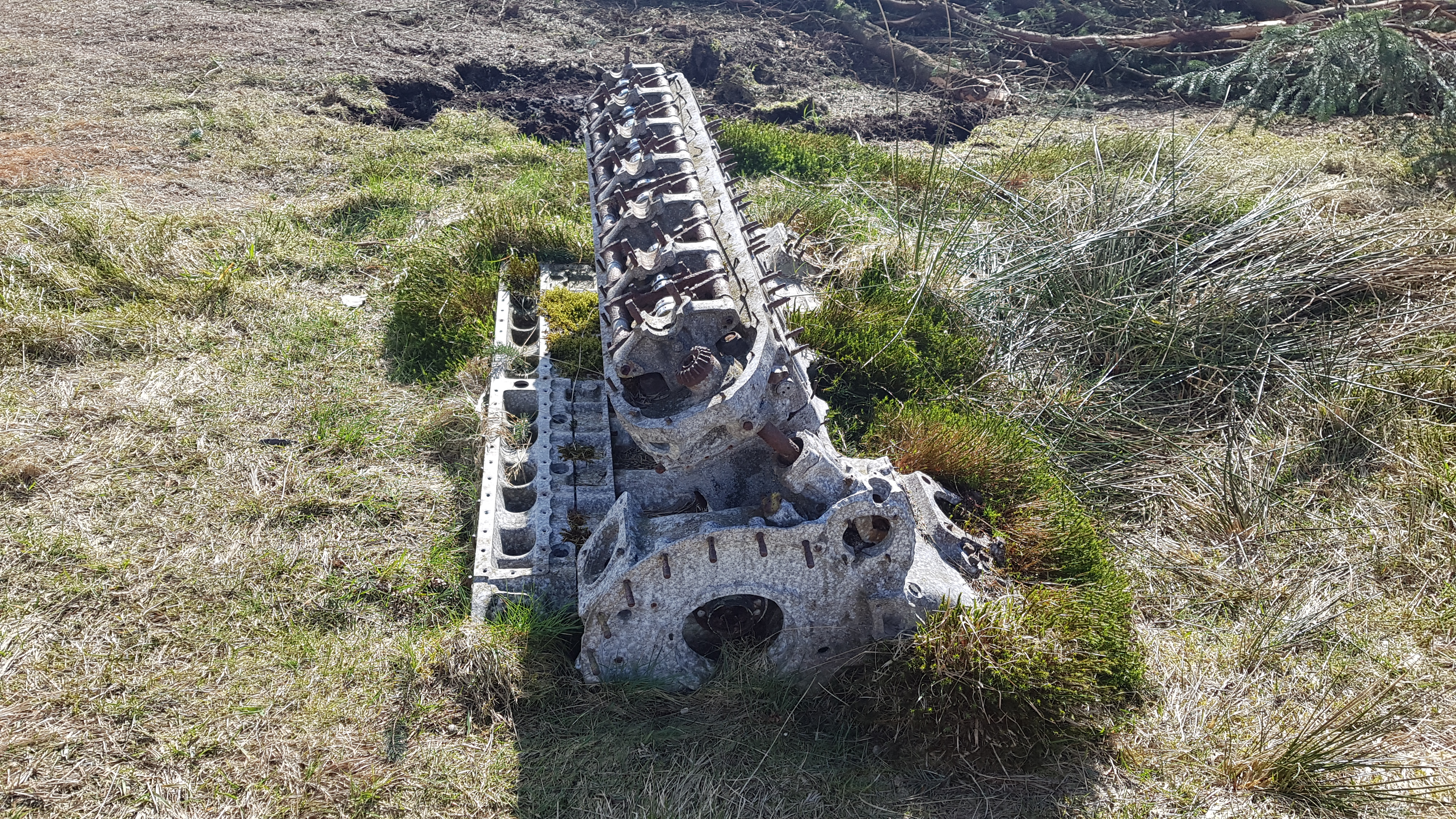
Aircraft wreckage on northwest slope, Rolls-Royce Griffon V12 aero engine
