= Finglen Burn =

Stream in Stirling, Scotland

Coordinates: 55.979765°N 4.228416°W

The Finglen Burn is a burn in Scotland that runs from north east of the Earl's Seat (the highest point on the Campsie Fells) to just north of Campsie Village where it merges with the Kirk Burn to form the Glazert Water. Named tributaries of the burn from the earliest to the latest are as follows: Cooper's Gote, Flaughter Burn, Earl's Burn, Altmarrage Burn, Almarnock Burn, Horse Burn, Almeel Burn and finally the Pow Burn.

In the History of Stirlingshire by William Nimmo, the burn is said to be named "to the alleged ancient resort of Giants".

== History ==
At one point there was a weaving factory on the burn at Haughhead. There was also once a printworks.

There were once seven illegal stills operating at the same time on the burn. Soldiers once came to the burn to find the spirit smugglers but no action was taken despite them knowing the smuggling was going on.

When cholera broke out in 1854, the ill were going to be moved from Lennoxtown to the burn at a building in Haughhead, formerly the weaving factory, converted into a temporary hospital. Straw was given for bedding by Mr Galbraith of Kilwinnet but a riot broke out among the Haughhead people and they came and got rid of it and the temporary hospital went unused.

On August 12, 1884, floods broke out on the Finglen which came about from the rupture of a spring in the nearby hills. Damage was done to Finglen Bank Cottage, two fields of oats and barley, the west side of Haughhead and the most considerable was done to the railway bridge crossing the burn.
