= List of places in East Dunbartonshire =

Map of places in East Dunbartonshire compiled from this list
See the list of places in Scotland for places in other counties.

This List of places in East Dunbartonshire is a list of links for any town, village and hamlet in the East Dunbartonshire council area of Scotland.

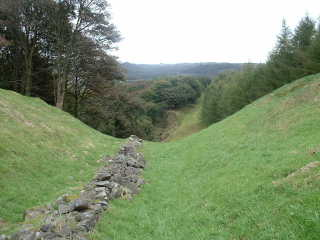
Antonine Wall

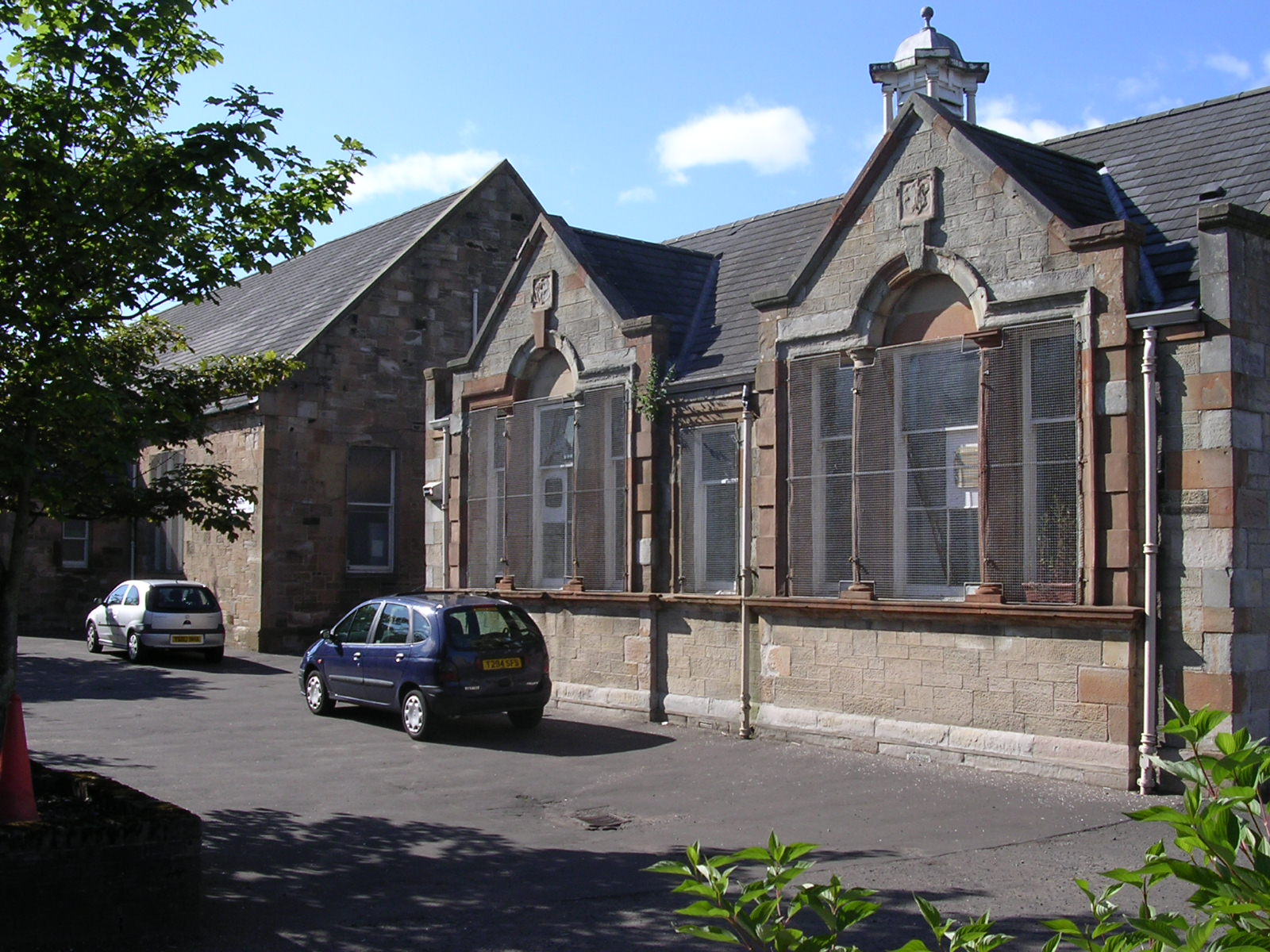
Old Auchinairn primary school

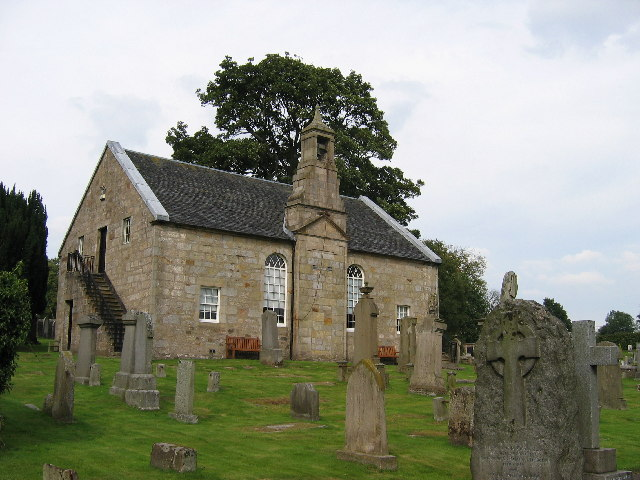
Baldernock Parish Church

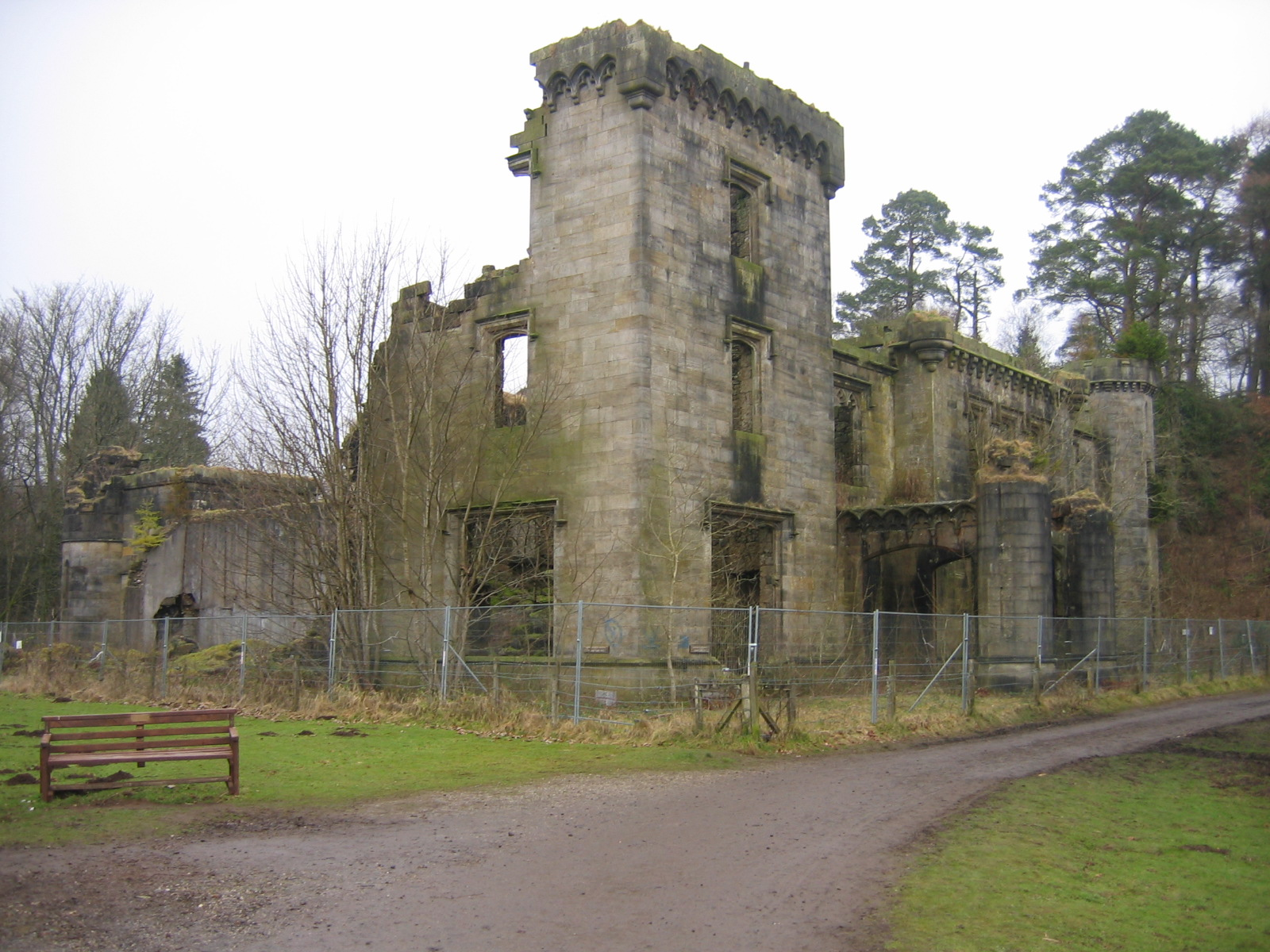
Craigend Castle in Mugdock Country Park

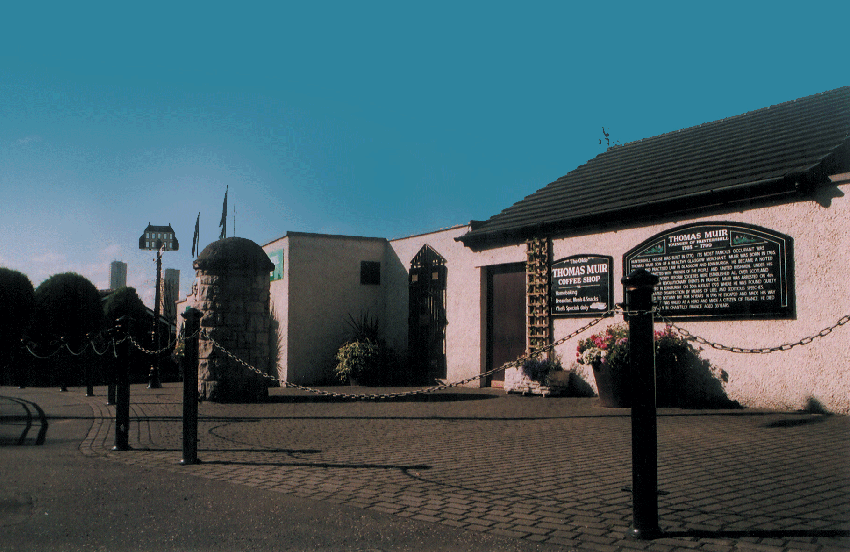
Huntershill Village, Crowhill Road pedestrian access

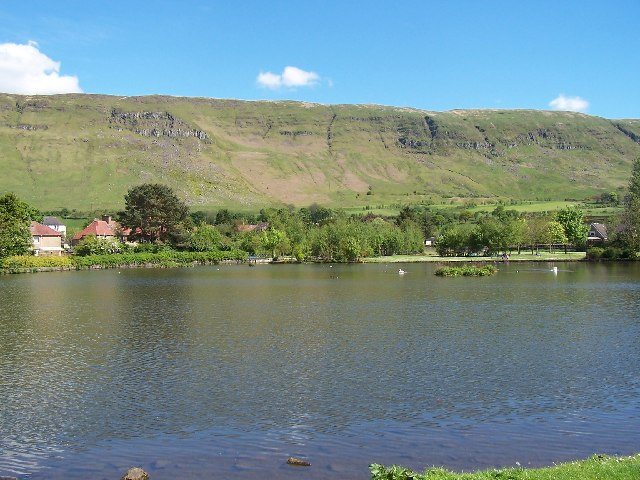
Lennoxtown Dam

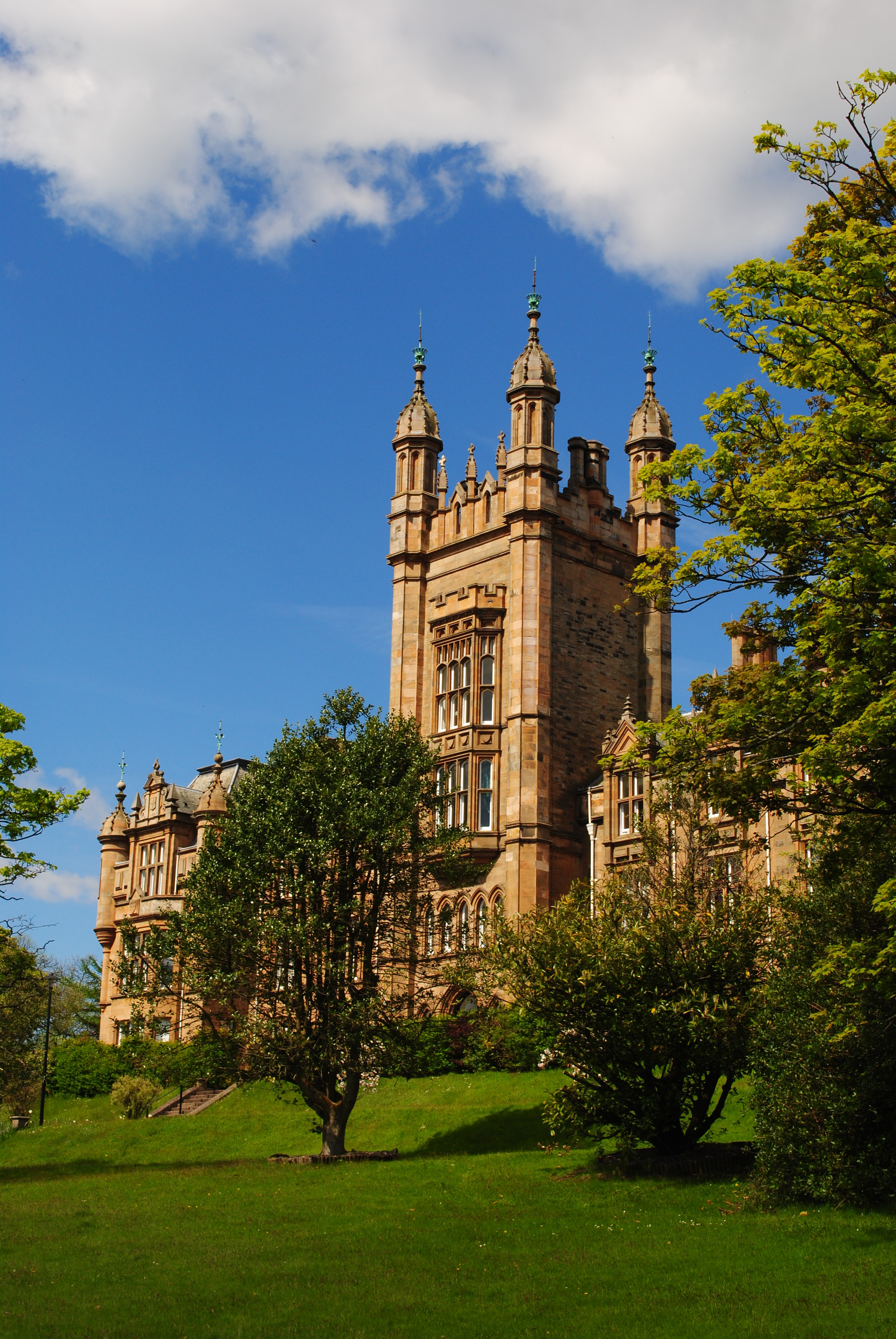
The former Schaw Convalescent Home at Bearsden, now converted into apartments

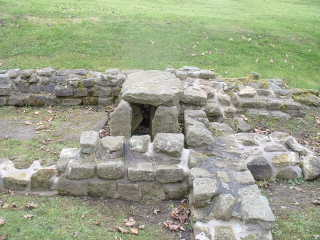
Antonine Wall

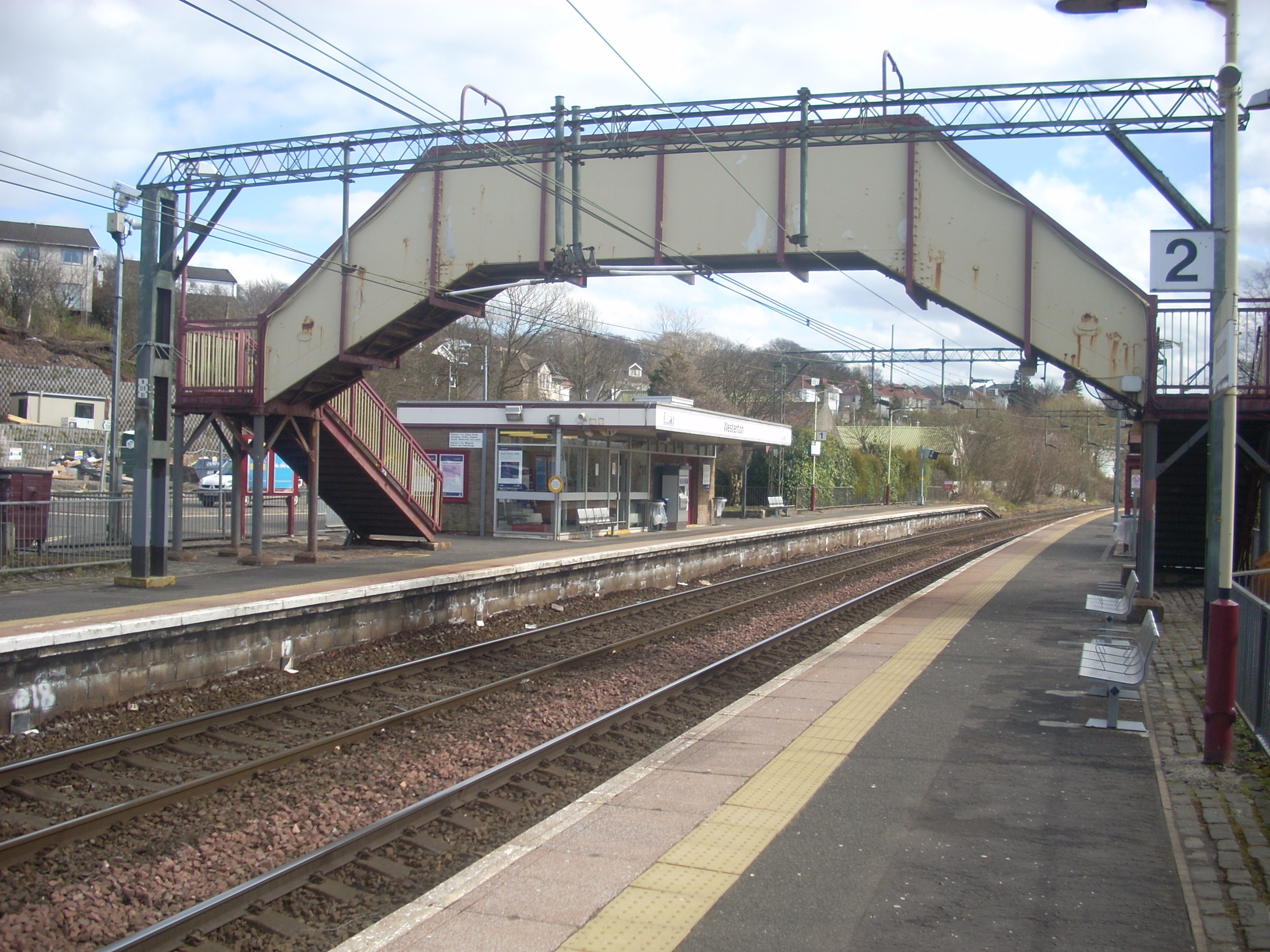
Westerton Railway Station

== A ==
- Auchenhowie
- Auchinairn
- Auchinreoch

== B ==
- Baldernock
- Balgrochan
- Balgrochan
- Bardowie
- Barnellan
- Barraston
- Birdston
- Bishopbriggs
- Blairskaith

== C ==
- Cadder
- Clachan of Campsie
- Craigton

== D ==
- Dougalston

== H ==
- Haughhead
- Huntershill Village

== K ==
- Kilmardinny
- Kirkintilloch

== L ==
- Lennoxtown
- Lenzie

== M ==
- Milngavie,
- Milton of Campsie

== T ==
- Torrance
- Twechar

== W ==
- Waterside

== See also ==
- List of places in Scotland
