= St Paul's Church (Milngavie) =

- St Paul's Parish Church
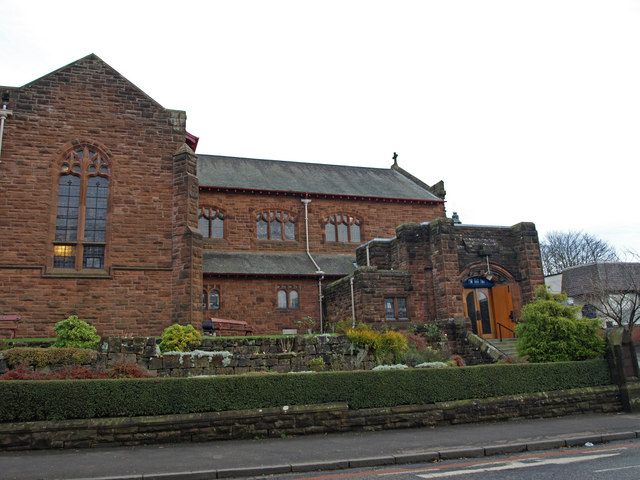
- St Paul's Church
- 55°56′31″N 4°18′40″W
- Location: Milngavie
- Country: Scotland
- Denomination: Church of Scotland
- Website: http://www.stpaulsmilngavie.org.uk

History
- Status: Parish Church
- Dedicated: 12 January 1906

Architecture
- Functional status: Active
- Heritage designation: Category C listed building
- Designated: 9th March 1978
- Style: Late gothic

Listed Building – Category C(S)
- Designated: 9 March 1978
- Reference no.: LB37848

St Paul's Church, often styled as St Paul's Milngavie, is a parish church of the Presbyterian Church of Scotland in the Scottish town of Milngavie in East Dunbartonshire, near Glasgow.

The church holds morning services every Sunday, in addition to a monthly evening service, which are livestreamed online. The church also hosts a range of church and community social and outreach groups.

In August 2024, Lynsey Brennan became the church's Minister, leading a ministry team supported by youth and pastoral care assistants.

== History ==
In 1787 members of the New Kilpatrick Parish Church in Bearsden (then known as Newkirk) broke from the Established Church. Permission was sought from the Relief Church in Glasgow. Thus, in 1788, the Kilpatrick Relief Church was established. Initially open-air services were held on Barloch Moor in a hollow beside the Tannoch Burn known as the "preaching braes". A church was finally built on the Barloch Estate, finished in 1799 at a cost of £500.

After several mergers within the church and the constantly growing congregation, the construction of new church buildings became necessary at the end of the 19th century. First, in 1903, the Cairns Church (named after John Cairns) was completed. Soon after, a competition was held for the design of the new church building for St Paul's Church; a design by the Edinburgh architectural practice Leadbetter & Fairley won the competition. The original plans for the building included a bell tower, but this was never completed. Violet Graham, Duchess of Montrose laid the memorial stone on 20 May 1905. The church was opened on 12 January 1906.

With the reintegration of most of the United Free Church of Scotland into the Church of Scotland in 1929, the parish of Milngavie was divided into three parishes. Although St Paul's Church was the largest building, it became the parish church of the smallest and most sparsely populated parish. Over the decades, the building has been constantly renovated.

== Building description ==
The church building is situated at the junction of Glasgow Road which carries the A81 through the city, and Baldernock Road.

The original church santurary, the primary space for worship services, is made of roughly hewn red sandstone; the transept has, unusually, two gables on each side; the window design is based on late Gothic architecture; and only the base of the planned bell tower was constructed.

The church also features a range of later extensions, which serve as additional spaces for church groups and staff, includuing several halls and offices.
