= Bardowie Castle =

Castle in East Dunbartonshire, Scotland

Coordinates: 55.9354°N 4.2776°W

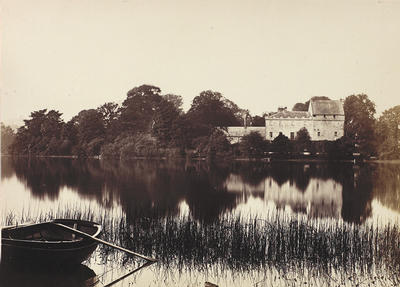
Bardowie Castle in 1870

Bardowie Castle is located 2 kilometres (1.2 mi) east of Milngavie, in East Dunbartonshire, Scotland. The A-Listed building overlooks Bardowie Loch. The oldest sections were built in the 16th century and additions were made in the 17th and 18th centuries.

== History ==
Bardowie was the property of the Clan Galbraith from 1214, and passed by marriage to John Hamilton of Cadzow in the later 14th century. The tower was built in 1566, with additions made from the late 17th or early 18th century. The later part of the castle is dated 1713. In the mid 18th century the castle passed by marriage to Thomas Buchanan of Spittal-Leny, whose descendants owned the castle until the early 20th century. Thomas' son Francis Buchanan-Hamilton claimed the chiefship of Clan Buchanan. In his 1854 Rambles Round Glasgow, Hugh Macdonald wrote that Bardowie Castle was "an edifice of moderate size, somewhat timeworn, yet withal wearing an appearance of quiet cosiness and comfort". The castle was sold several times in the 20th century, including in 1912 and 1951.

The castle has been a category A listed building since 1973. LB5726 The description stated: "Tower c.1566, and additions made from late C17th or early C18th onwards. The latter are still occupied as a modern mansion".

In 2002, the property was owned by motivational speaker Jack Black, the founder of MindStore, who listed it for sale when he was unable to get a permit to operate his wife's software business from the property. By that time, the interior had been extensively modernized. In 2004, the castle interior was described as including "6 reception rooms, 9 bedrooms, 8 bath/shower rooms, kitchen, library, home cinema, 2 kitchenettes, sauna, gymnasium."

The property was listed for sale in June 2019, and the news report photos indicated that the interior had certainly been modernized. The grounds included a former orchard, tennis court, walled garden, two garages and a patio.
