= Clachan of Campsie =

Settlement in East Dunbartonshire, Scotland

Coordinates: 55.9882°N 4.2297°W

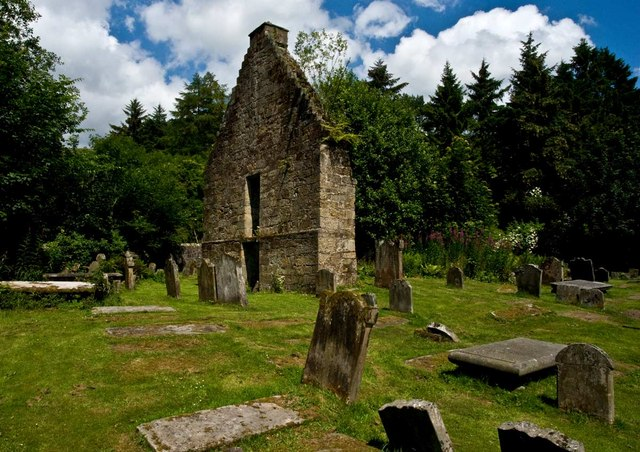
- St Machan's Church

- Location within East Dunbartonshire
- OS grid reference: NS6179
- Civil parish: Campsie
- Council area: East Dunbartonshire
- Lieutenancy area: Dunbartonshire
- Country: Scotland
- Sovereign state: United Kingdom
- Post town: GLASGOW
- Postcode district: G66
- Dialling code: 01360
- Police: Scotland
- Fire: Scottish
- Ambulance: Scottish
- UK Parliament: Cumbernauld, Kilsyth and Kirkintilloch East
- Scottish Parliament: Strathkelvin and Bearsden

Clachan of Campsie or Campsie Glen (Scottish Gaelic: Clachan Chamais) is a settlement in the East Dunbartonshire area of Scotland. It was formerly part of the county of Stirlingshire. It is situated to the south of the Campsie Fells at the foot of Campsie Glen where the Finglen and Aldessan Burns meet, forming the Glazert Water which then flows south-east until it joins the River Kelvin near Kirkintilloch.

== History ==
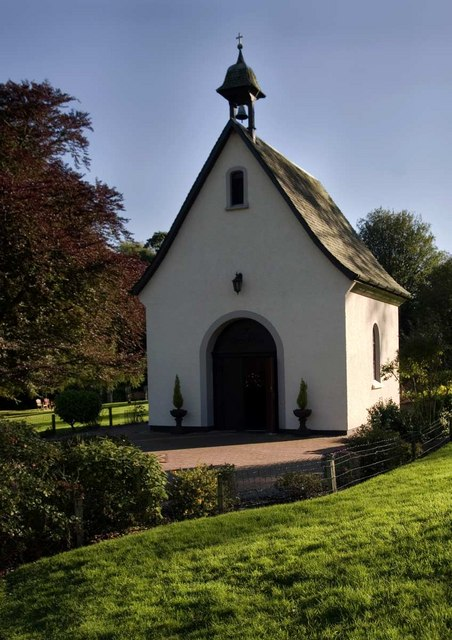
Originally called Ballencleroch House, the shrine of Schoenstatt in Clachan of Campsie features gardens and a shrine to Our Lady of Schoenstatt. There is a woodland walk in Schoenstatt.

In early 1962, Sister Xavera brought Schoenstatt to Scotland by building a centre for German Catholic residents. Sister Vincetas later joined her and they worked together for many years in Ardmory in the south of Glasgow. They worked in a large area of Scotland and down to Manchester. They looked after German ex-soldiers and many others. After time, Schoenstatt began to grow, and slowly a small family Movement began to appear. Sister Xavera had a wish that a shrine could be built, and very slowly items for the shrine began to arrive, such as the altar in the 1970s and then the vocations in the 1980s. Father Duncan McVicar and Father Bryan Cunningham were ordained as priests at Schoenstatt. Sister Mary-Elsbeth Owens and Sister Marion McClay joined the Schoenstatt movement with Father Michael Savage who joined the Schoenstatt Priest's Institute. The move to establish a shrine came with Sister Margareta and Sister Patricia. The shrine was opened in Campsie Glen in 1989 and then the Formation Centre in 1995. Neighbours in the area call the shrine nowadays "The Schoenstatt".

== Attractions ==
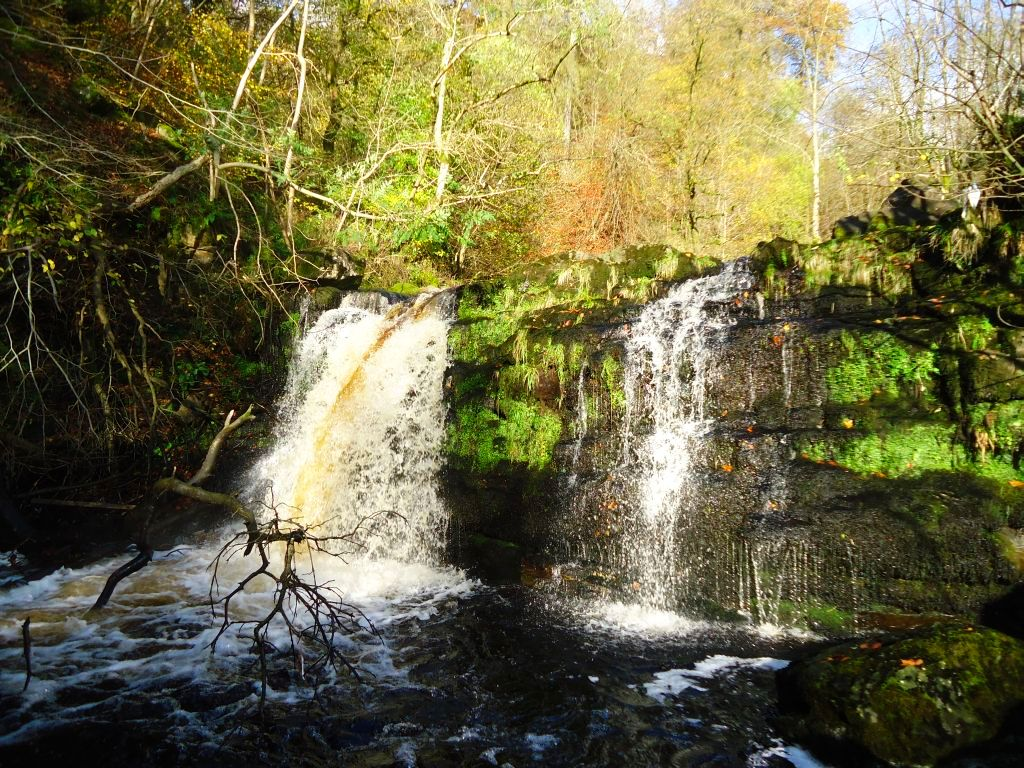
Campsie Glen waterfall

At the foot of Campsie Glen, there is a picturesque walk following along the banks of the Finglen burn to some waterfalls. An offshoot of this path also carries on to the so-called "car park in the sky" with views over Lennoxtown and beyond to Glasgow. At the start of the walk there is a small car park, and a number of buildings, one of which is currently run as a bike shop – Wheelcraft. The settlement also used to have a pub, the Haughead Inn, which is now closed down and has periodically been put up for sale.

=== Kincaids of Campsie ===
In the graveyard there is a mausoleum of the Kincaids.
