= Earl's Seat =

Hill in central Scotland

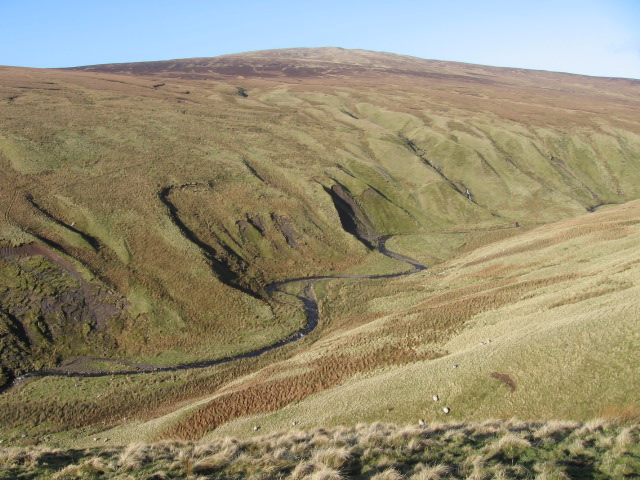
- Earl's Seat

Highest point
- Elevation: 578 m (1,896 ft)
- Prominence: 511 m (1,677 ft)
- Isolation: 19.89 km (12.36 mi)
- Listing: Marilyn
- Coordinates: 56°01′33″N 4°17′47″W

Geography
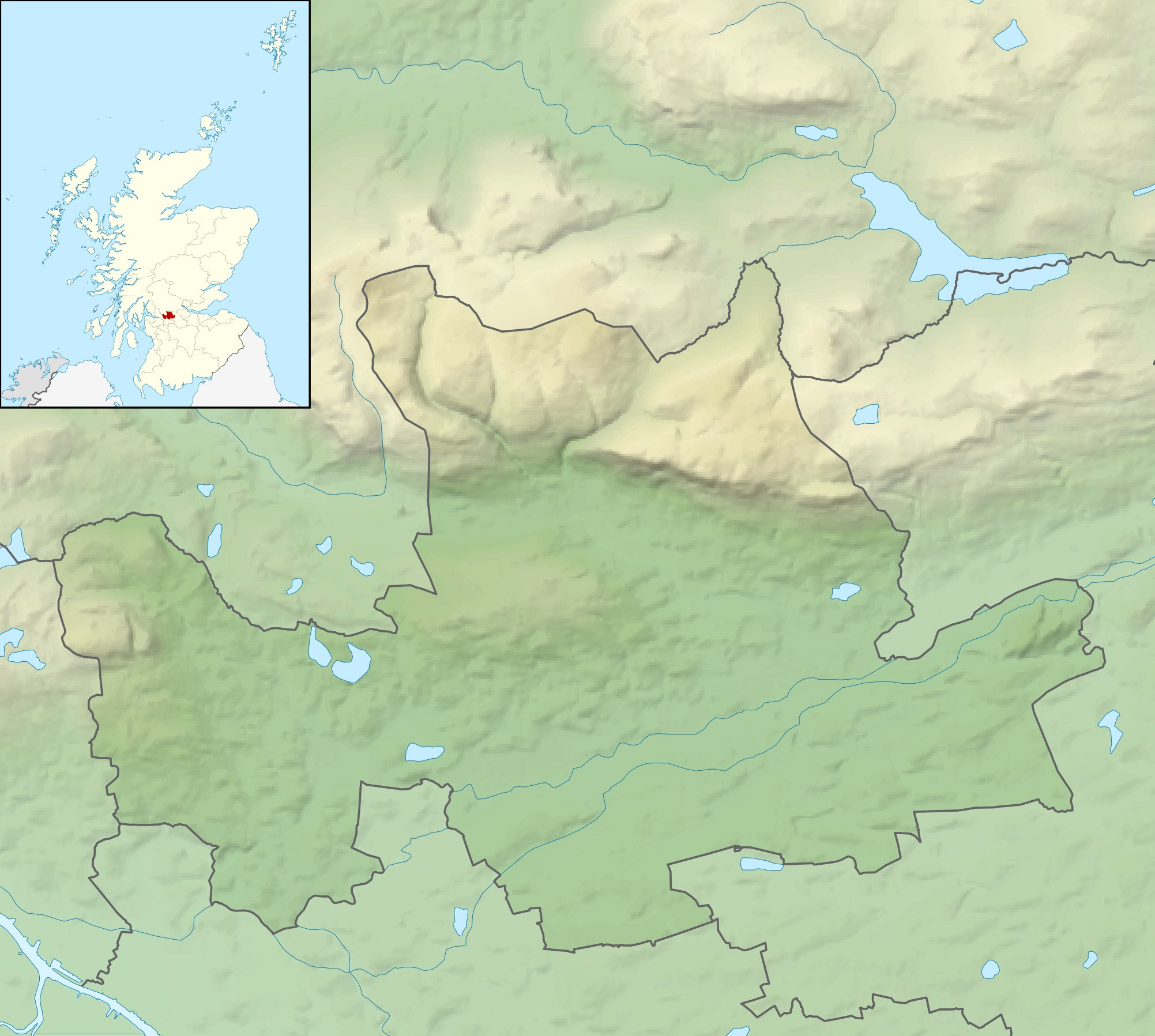
- Location within East Dunbartonshire Location within Scotland
- Location: East Dunbartonshire / Stirling, Scotland
- Parent range: Campsie Fells
- OS grid: NS570838
- Topo map: OS Landranger 57, 64

Earl's Seat (578 m) is the highest hill of the Campsie Fells in Central Scotland. It lies on the border of Stirlingshire and East Dunbartonshire in central Scotland. Located on a plateau in the heart of the Campsies above the village of Strathblane, its summit is marked by a trig point.
