= River Kelvin =

Coordinates: 55.86518°N 4.30815°W

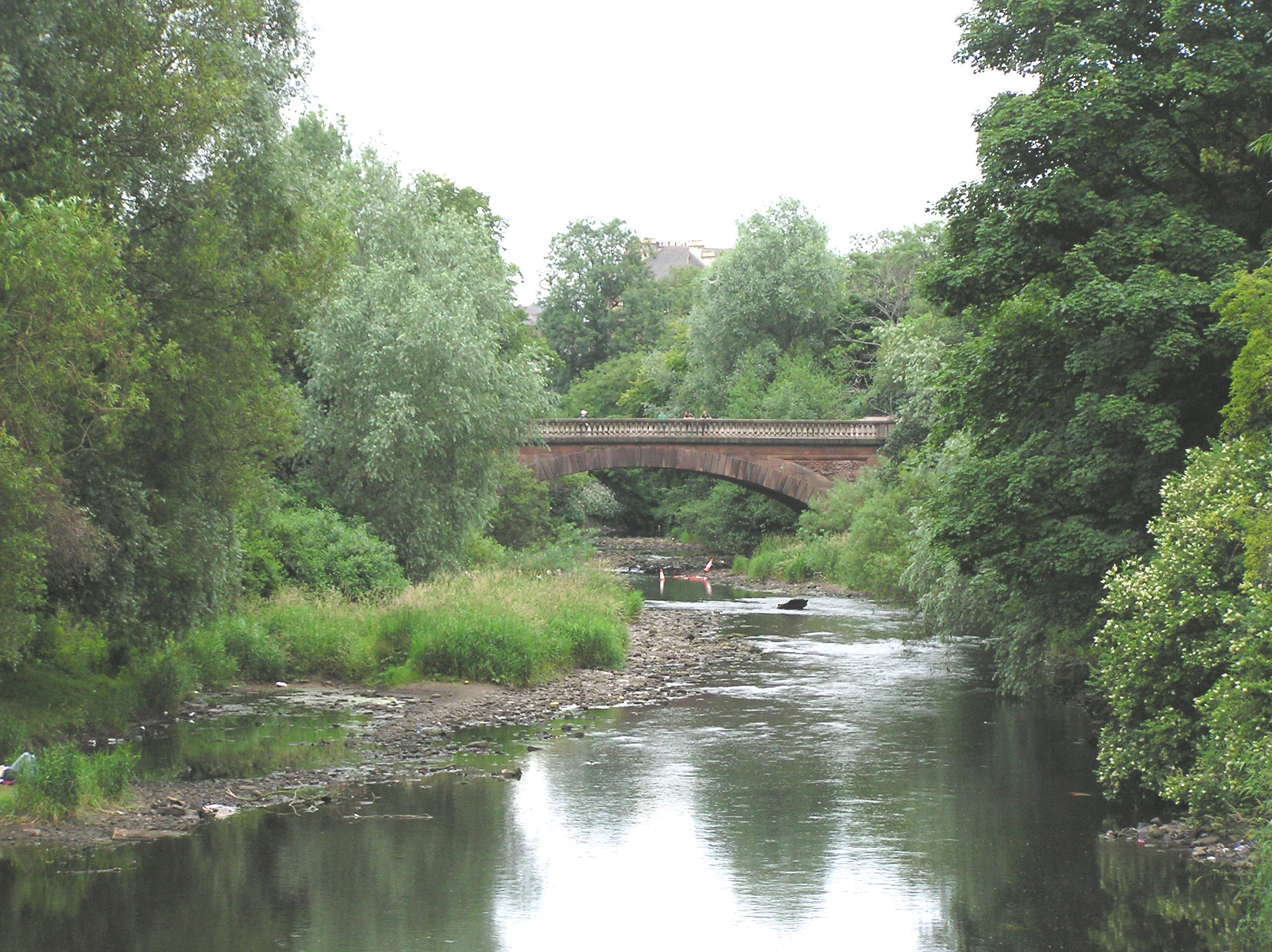
- The Kelvin flowing through Kelvingrove Park

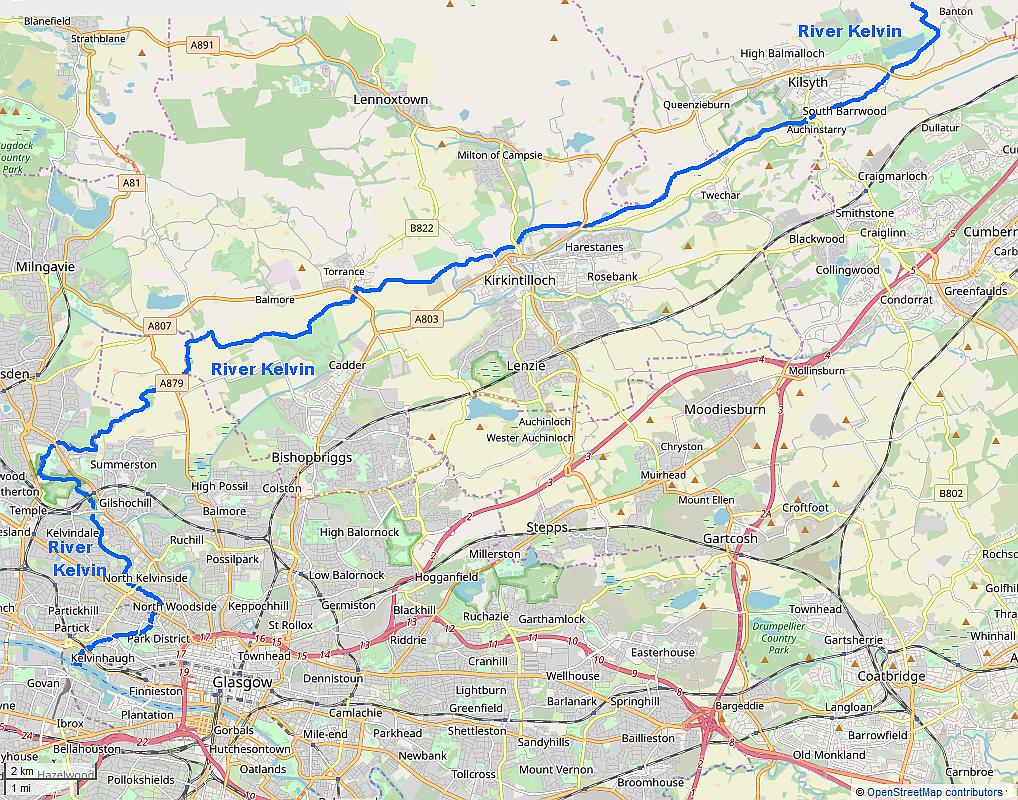

Location
- Country: Scotland

Physical characteristics
- Source
  - location: close to Banton, Scotland
- Mouth: River Clyde
  - location: Glasgow, Scotland
- Length: 22 mi (35 km)

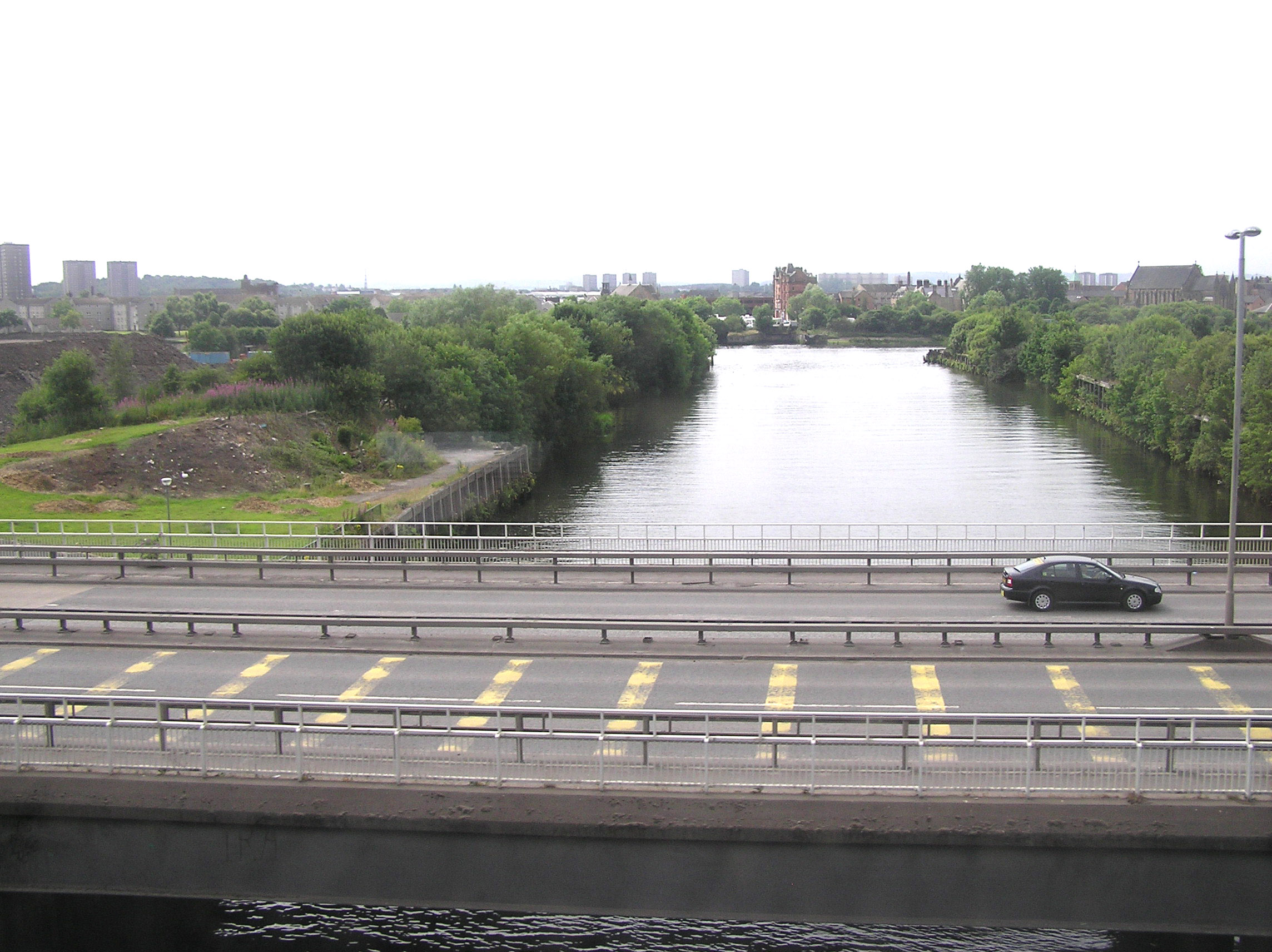
The Kelvin flowing under the Clydeside Expressway and into the River Clyde (as seen from a train on the Kelvin Railway Viaduct), photographed prior to the construction of an additional bridge serving the Riverside Museum

The River Kelvin (Scottish Gaelic: Abhainn Cheilbhinn) is a tributary of the River Clyde in northern and northeastern Glasgow, Scotland. It rises on the moor south east of the village of Banton, east of Kilsyth. At almost 22 miles (35 km) long, it initially flows south to Dullatur Bog where it falls into a man made trench and takes a ninety degree turn flowing west through Strathkelvin and along the northern boundary of the bog parallel with the Forth and Clyde Canal.

The University of Glasgow is situated by the river, in Gilmorehill. In 1892, the title of Baron Kelvin was created for physicist and engineer William Thomson, a professor at the university. The name "kelvin" for the unit of temperature, chosen in honour of Lord Kelvin, thus traces its origins to the river.

The Kelvin Walkway follows the river from the Riverside Museum where it meets the Clyde to the Allander Water, which it then follows in to Milngavie, creating a link between the Clyde Walkway and West Highland Way.

== Etymology ==
The hydronym Kelvin is probably of Brittonic origin. It may involve *celeμïn, of which the Welsh cognate celefyn means "stem, stalk", or else the zero-grade of the Indo European root of that element *kl̥h1-, "rise up".

== Confluence ==
The river's first important (and considerably larger) confluence is with the Chantyclear Burn which originates from the ridge of Dullatur. It then continues its westward flow being joined by the often depleted (due to water being diverted to the canal) Shawend Burn to the west of Craigmarloch bridge. The next important tributary is the Garrel at a point south-east of Kilsyth south of Dumbreck Marsh. The Kelvin then passes through the large flood plain north of Twechar where it is fed by the Dock Water, Queenzie Burn, the Cast Burn and the Board Burn before reaching Kirkintilloch at its confluence with the more substantial waters of the Glazert and Luggie. It then flows past Torrance, meanders through Balmore Haughs, to the south of Bardowie where it joins the Allander Water, after which it takes a south-westerly direction towards Maryhill, Hillhead, through Kelvingrove Park and under the Clydeside Expressway before falling into the River Clyde at Yorkhill Basin in the city of Glasgow.

== Fauna ==
Wildlife along Strathkelvin include the grey squirrel, magpie, grey heron, dipper, cormorant, blue tit, great tit, chaffinch, common snipe, great spotted woodpecker, blackbird, redwing, carrion crow, kingfisher, mallard, goosander, roe deer, red fox, otter, water vole, American mink and brown rat.

Successive attempts at improving the quality of the water have been rewarded by the return of salmon. The river has always been home to brown trout and both species can be fished by obtaining the relevant permits.

== Bridges over the Kelvin ==
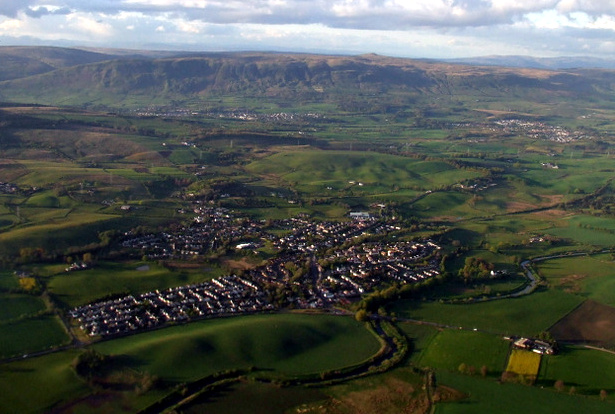
Torrance Bridge over the River Kelvin in the foreground with Milton of Campsie and Lennoxtown in the background.

The Kelvin is bridged at several points throughout Glasgow. Perhaps most notable is the Great Western Bridge on Great Western Road in the city's West End. Below this is an underground station that bears the name Kelvinbridge, a name commonly attached to the area. Other bridges include one near the Antonine Wall at Balmuildy, the Ha'penny Footbridge in Glasgow Botanic Gardens, minor road bridges at Queen Margaret Drive, Belmont Street and Eldon Street, several in the grounds of Kelvingrove Park, Partick Bridge on Dumbarton Road and prominent railway and road viaducts at Yorkhill where it flows into the Clyde.

The Kelvin Aqueduct carries the Forth and Clyde Canal over the river near Maryhill; it was Britain's largest when it was opened. The river is used as an overflow for the canal. The two water courses run largely parallel from the source of the Kelvin in the countryside north of Glasgow (almost meeting at several points such as Auchinstarry near Kilsyth, at Kirkintilloch and between Cadder and Torrance) but follow different paths through the northern and western parts of the city.

== See also ==
- Allander Water, Allander Burn
- Kelvinhead
- List of places in East Dunbartonshire
- List of places in Scotland
