= Milngavie =

Town in Scotland

Coordinates: 55.9421°N 4.3137°W

Milngavie: Scottish Gaelic: Muileann-Ghaidh
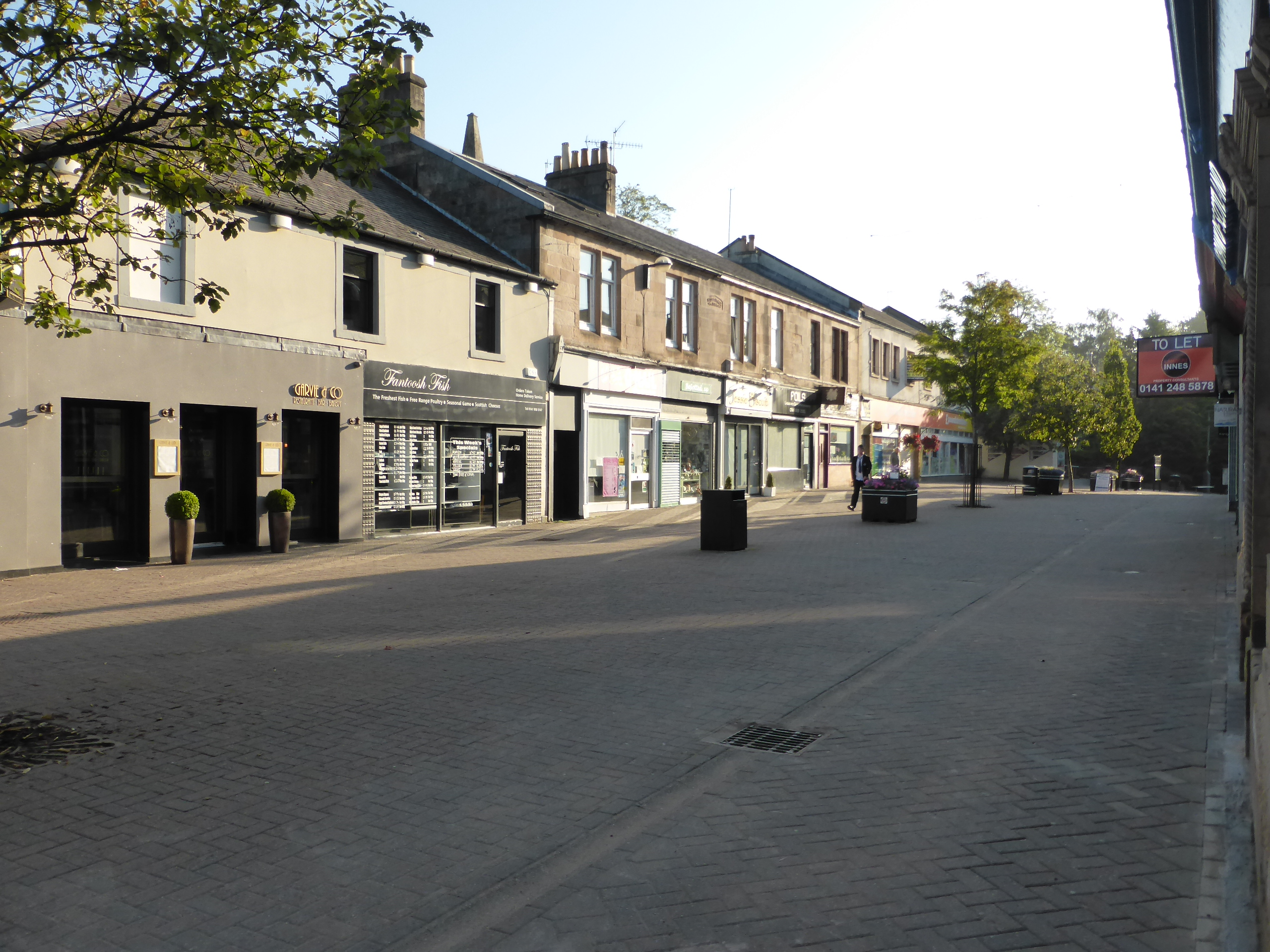
- Milngavie town centre (pedestrianised area)

- Location within East Dunbartonshire Milngavie (East Dunbartonshire)
- Population: 12,840 (2020)
- OS grid reference: NS553744
- Council area: East Dunbartonshire
- Lieutenancy area: Dunbartonshire
- Country: Scotland
- Sovereign state: United Kingdom
- Post town: GLASGOW
- Postcode district: G62
- Dialling code: 0141
- Police: Scotland
- Fire: Scottish
- Ambulance: Scottish
- UK Parliament: Mid Dunbartonshire
- Scottish Parliament: Clydebank and Milngavie

Milngavie (/mʌlˈɡaɪ/ mul-GHY; Scottish Gaelic: Muileann-Ghaidh) is a town in East Dunbartonshire, Scotland and a suburb of Glasgow. It is on the Allander Water, at the northwestern edge of Greater Glasgow, and about ten kilometres (six miles) from Glasgow city centre. It neighbours Bearsden.

In 2018, the Scottish Government published statistics for the town showing that the population increased to 13,537 in 6,062 households. The town is also a popular retirement location, with a high number of elderly people living there.

The Milngavie and Bearsden Herald, owned by Johnston Press, is a weekly newspaper that covers local events from the schools, town halls, community and government in the area. The paper was established in 1901 and is printed every Wednesday, to be sold on Thursdays.

The town is the start point of the West Highland Way long distance footpath which runs northwards for 154 kilometres (96 mi) to the town of Fort William. A granite obelisk in the town centre marks the official starting point of the footpath.

== History ==
Milngavie's name is of Gaelic origin, and may mean either "windmill" (muileann-gaoithe) or "windy hill" (meall na gaoithe). The town grew from a country village in the parish of New Kilpatrick to a minor industrial centre in the nineteenth century, with paper mills and bleach works on the Allander River to the north-west of the town centre. Some remnants of this industry remain today on the Cloberfield Industrial Estate. The land surrounding the village comprised several estates with tenant farms, amongst them Barloch, Clober, Craigton, Craigdhu, Dougalston, Douglas Mains and South Mains.

Stone-built villas and semi-detached houses were constructed for wealthy citizens to the east of the town centre and around Tannoch Loch when commuting to Glasgow was made possible by the opening of the railway which reached the town in 1863. After World War II a local authority housing scheme was built to the west of the town centre, housing many people relocated from Clydebank which had been badly bombed. The town grew with the addition of private speculative housing developments of bungalows and semi-detached homes at South Mains to the south of the town centre and around Clober, to the west, in the 1950s and 1960s.

The town was historically served by routes 13 and 14 of the extensive Glasgow tramway system. Tramway services in Milngavie were withdrawn in 1956 and the entire system was dismantled by September 1962.

The Fairways estate was built, starting in 1977 and continued into the 1980s.

The town centre was redeveloped to improve traffic flow and pedestrian safety. The central commercial streets were pedestrianised starting in 1974 and many buildings were replaced. A superstore was opened on the fringes of the town centre in the 1990s.

In 2008, residents launched a tongue-in-cheek campaign to bring the Olympic games to Milngavie in 2020.

Today the town is primarily a dormitory town for the nearby city of Glasgow.

== Governance ==
Milngavie, originally in Stirlingshire, was in an area that became an exclave of Dunbartonshire on the orders of King David II (1324–1371). In 1875, whilst remaining part of Dunbartonshire, it became a police burgh under the jurisdiction of the Stirlingshire constabulary and retained burgh status for 100 years until 1975 when it was absorbed into the newly created Strathclyde Region.

Milngavie is located to the north of the neighbouring town of Bearsden. Although the two are in close proximity, the social histories of these two towns differ significantly. Bearsden grew almost exclusively as a dormitory town of Glasgow for the wealthy and professional classes. In that sense both towns now fulfil a similar role. The two became a single local authority district in 1975, before Scottish Local Government reorganisation in the 1990s re-integrated them with the towns of Kirkintilloch and Bishopbriggs, to form the East Dunbartonshire administrative area.

In 2014, businesses in Milngavie voted in favour of becoming a Business Improvement District (BID) to work with East Dunbartonshire Council and community groups to improve the town and commercial viability of the central pedestrianised business area.

== Transport ==
=== Rail ===
Milngavie is a commuter town, with much of its working population travelling to Glasgow to work or study. The town is served by Milngavie railway station on the North Clyde Line of the SPT rail network, with services to Glasgow, Springburn and Edinburgh.

== Landmarks ==
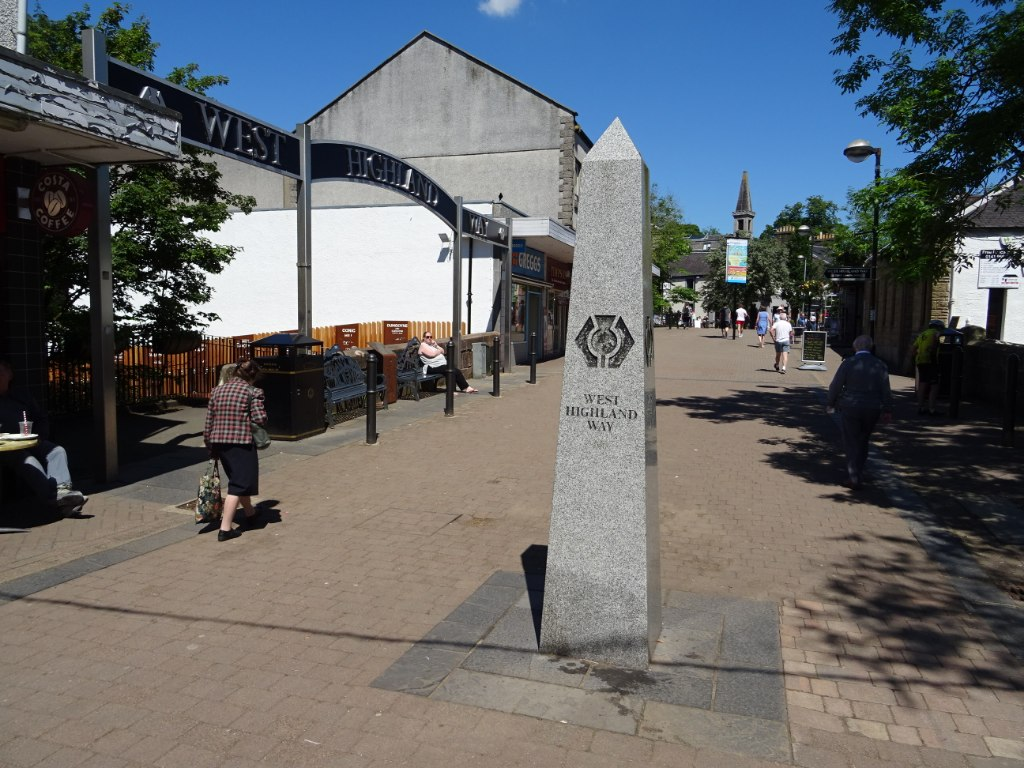
West Highland Way obelisk, Milngavie

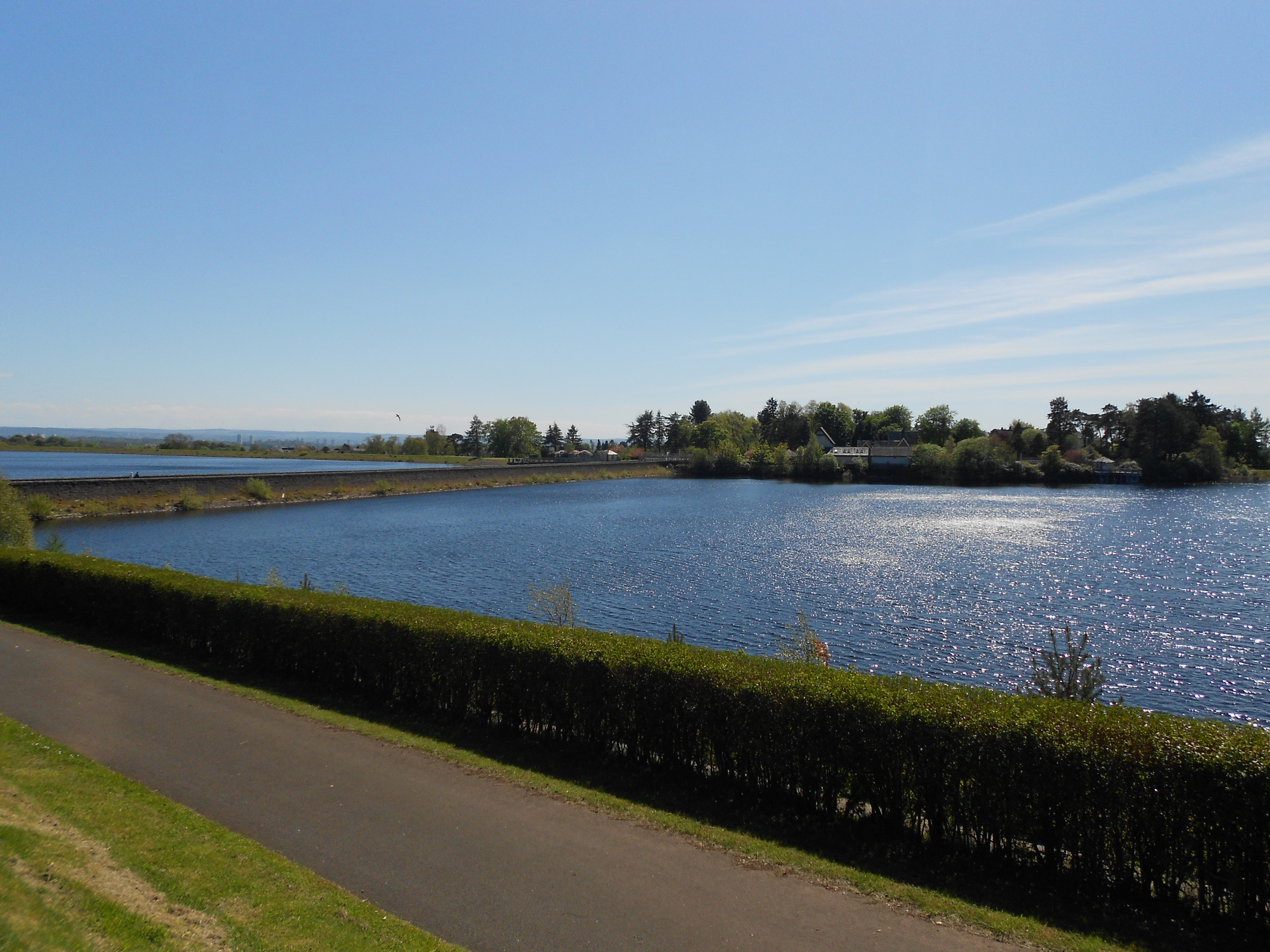
Milngavie water treatment works

Little remains of the pre-nineteenth century village other than the Corbie Ha' meeting hall, Cross Keys Public House, although now renovated and renamed, and the Gavin's Mill water mill on the Allander Water along with Barloch House and Barloch Farm.

There are a few good examples of nineteenth century stone villas along the Station Road as well as the well preserved nineteenth century railway station. Many interesting Victorian houses around the Tannoch Conservation Area show Scottish cottage, Scottish Baronial, Classical architecture and Gothic influences. The town centre and Strathblane Road have remaining Victorian shop/tenement buildings and a few Arts and crafts influenced commercial buildings. Craigmillar Avenue and the area around Baldernock Road have some large Arts and Crafts and Glasgow Style influenced houses.

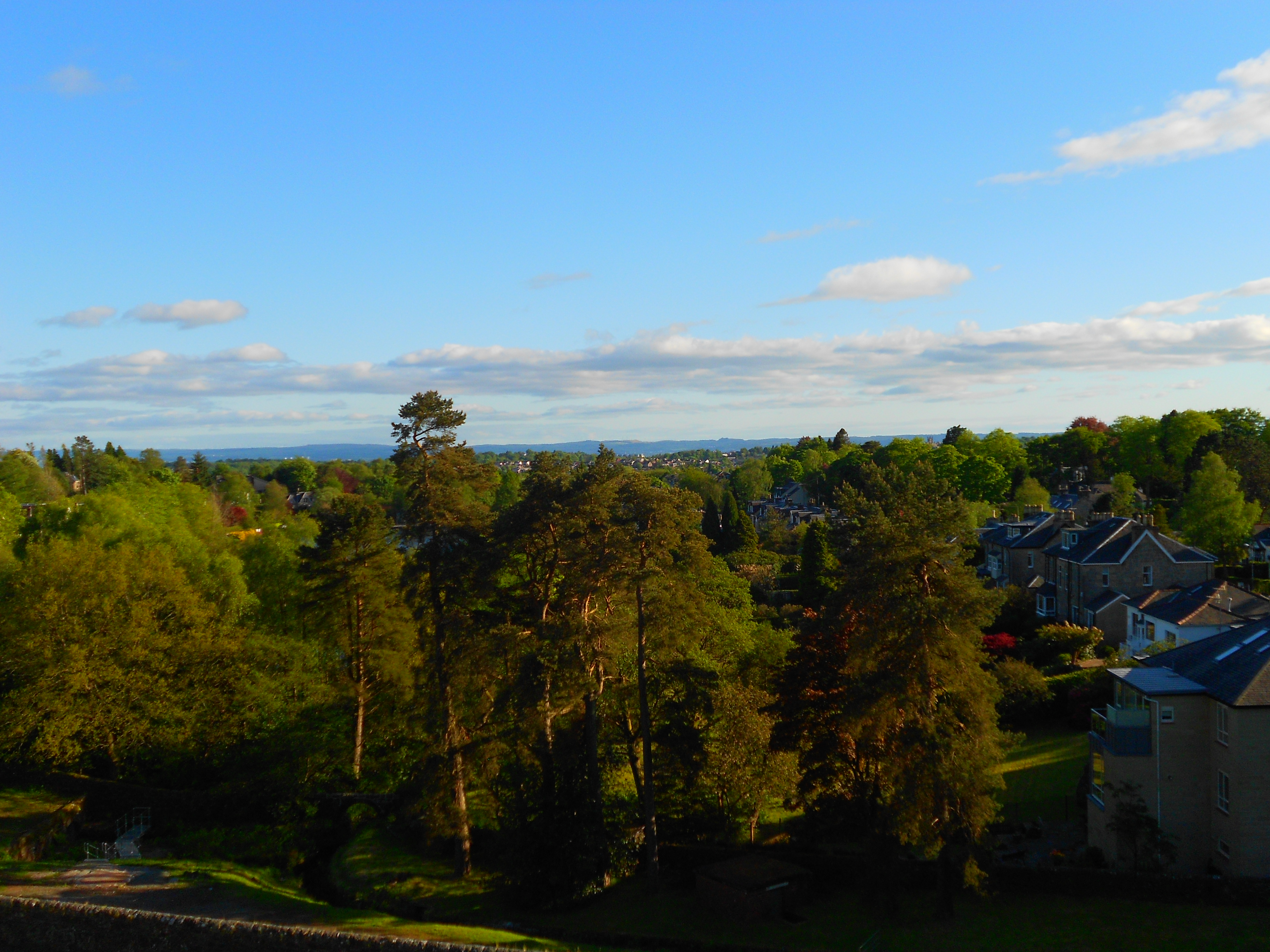
View across Milngavie

The bulk of the housing stock is twentieth century, showing Scottish vernacular influences such as harling or rough-casting, and, occasionally, more traditionally English elements like black and white timber paneled dormer windows and gables.

The public sheltered housing projects of the 1970s and 1980s are interesting for their attempts to use traditional local materials like grey rough-cast and slate plus interesting rounded walls and pitched roofs.

The most recent development is characterised by some interesting one-off conversions and extensions to Victorian properties; new housing by developers that often follows designs based on the brick architecture of the South of England; and contemporary steel framed commercial and leisure buildings.

The Milngavie reservoir is visited by tourists and walkers. The reservoir is made up of the Craigmaddie and Mugdock reservoirs and was opened in 1859 by Queen Victoria. It is the main supplier of water to the city of Glasgow and can hold up to 548 million imperial gallons (2.49 gigalitres) of water.

The war memorial is by George Henry Paulin.

The Auld Wives' Lifts, an interesting natural rock feature, is located on Craigmaddie Muir to the north east of Milngavie.

== Education ==
=== Secondary schools ===
- Douglas Academy: A state-funded secondary school, which includes a Music School for gifted children who gain entry through audition and board in Glasgow's West End

=== Primary schools ===
State funded:

- Clober Primary
- Craigdhu Primary
- Milngavie Primary

Privately funded:

- The Glasgow Academy Milngavie is a fee paying Nursery and Primary School that is part of The Glasgow Academy, whose senior school and other departments are located at Colebrooke Street in the West End of Glasgow.

== Places of worship ==
- Allander Evangelical Church
- Cairns Church of Scotland
- Milngavie United Free Church of Scotland
- St. Andrew's Episcopal Church
- St. Joseph's Roman Catholic Church
- St. Luke's Church of Scotland
- St. Paul's Church of Scotland

Originally Milngavie was in the Parish of New Kilpatrick, the church being that of New Kilpatrick in Bearsden, with no formal place of worship in the town until the eighteenth century. Milngavie now has three stone built churches dating from the early twentieth century within 500 m of each other. Until the 1970s these three were all Church of Scotland congregations (those of St.Paul's, Cairns, and St.Luke's) in consequence of the history of the Kirk (Church of Scotland) which saw a multitude of factions and congregations organise, each with varying forms of worship and constitutional arrangements, and which subsequently re-integrated. St.Paul's was always in the fold of the Church of Scotland and is now the parish church of Milngavie. It was originally housed in a simple grey stone church building above the Station Road beside the Milngavie Primary School before moving to a handsome red sandstone building on the Strathblane Road in 1906. The original building is now apartments. From 1799 Cairns Church had been located in a building on Mugdock Road close to the 'preaching braes' on Barloch Moor where the congregation's first services had taken place. It moved to its present building on Buchanan Street in 1903 which displays elements of the Glasgow Style of architecture and design. St.Luke's had been built as the Milngavie United Free Church. In the 1970s it was decided that the concentration of churches in one area should be reviewed and a new St. Lukes was built on the western side of the town to serve the residents of Clober. The Roman Catholic Church bought the old St.Luke's Church and moved their congregation to the new premises from a church (also "St. Joseph's" - now no longer there) on Buchanan Street at Moor Road which was associated with the neighbouring Roman Catholic Convent of Ladywood which closed in the 1970s.

== Sporting institutions ==
Rangers F.C. has their professional training facility, The Rangers Training Centre, at Auchenhowie Road in the east of the town. It was officially opened on 4 July 2001 by then-manager Dick Advocaat and then-chairman David Murray, after whom it was originally named as Murray Park. The total cost of the complex was estimated at £14 million. Following improvements completed in 2019, the facility became the regular home venue for competitive matches played by Rangers' Women's team, Reserve team and Under 18's team as well as many younger age groups. On 2 August 2019 the new Academy Stand with an all-seated capacity of 226 was officially opened at The Rangers Training Centre before hosting a Reserve friendly against Chelsea finishing in a 1–1 draw.

Milngavie is the base of West of Scotland F.C., a rugby club, which dates from 1865 and is one of the founder members of the SRU. They were one of the first open rugby clubs in Scotland, i.e. not affiliated to any school.

Due to the town's suburban and residential profile, it is home to many sporting clubs and facilities.

- Allander Leisure Centre
- Milngavie Cricket Club
- Milngavie Bowling Club
- Claremont Bowling Club
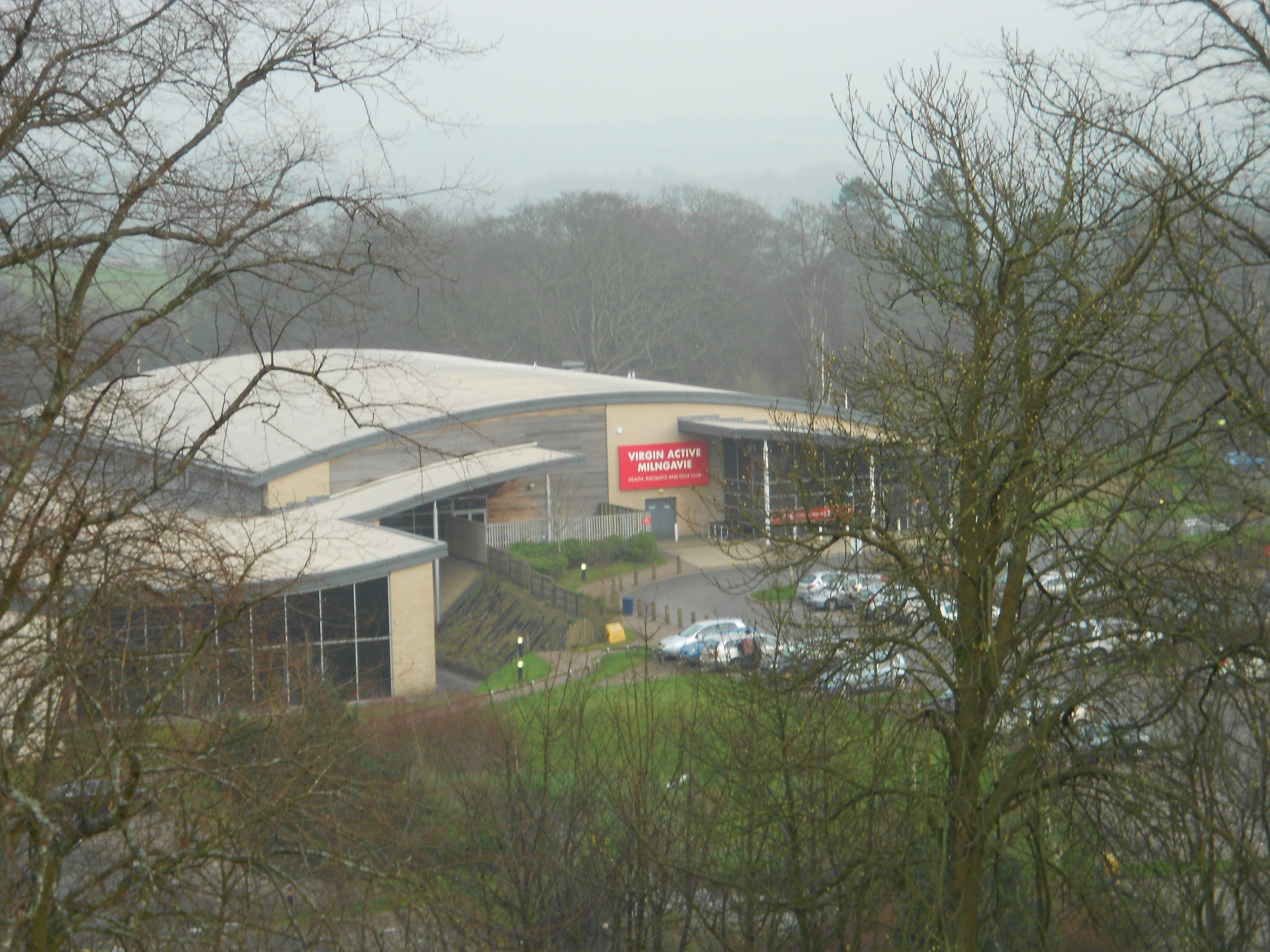
  Virgin Active Milngavie. Previously Esporta Health Clubs and now operating as Nuffield Health Milngavie
- Clober Golf Club
- Milngavie Golf Club
- Milngavie Wanderers AFC
- Nuffield Health Fitness and Wellbeing
- Hilton Park Golf Club
- Glasgow Vipers Inline Hockey Club
- Sports Direct Fitness.com (formerly LA Fitness)
- Milngavie Lawn Tennis Club
- Western Wildcats Hockey Club
- Milngavie Football Club
- Milngavie and Bearsden Amateur Swimming Club

== Notable people ==
The playwright Robert McLellan grew up in the town where his father, John, founded and ran the local Allander Press, with premises in the Black Bull Yard from c.1912.

The footballer Murdo MacLeod, who played for Dumbarton, Celtic, Borussia Dortmund and Hibernian, and at international level for Scotland, was born and brought up in Milngavie.

The former Liberal Democrat leader Jo Swinson was born and brought up in Milngavie. She attended local school Douglas Academy. She is the former Parliamentary Under Secretary of State for Employment relations, consumer and postal affairs, having lost her seat in the 2015 General Election, only to regain it in 2017. She then lost her seat in 2019, resulting in Jo stepping down as leader for the Liberal Democrat Party.

Prof Edward Eisner of the University of Strathclyde lived in Milngavie.

Racing driver Gerry Birrell was born and raised in Milngavie before moving south to London as he became more successful.

Margaret Cunnison (29 May 1914 – 4 January 2004) was a Scottish aviator and the first Scottish woman flying instructor. She was one of the first women to join the Air Transport Auxiliary.

Professional footballer Greg Docherty was born in the town and attended Douglas Academy. He is club captain at Charlton Athletic.

The author Agnes Owens was born in Milngavie.

== See also ==
- Milngavie water treatment works
- Bennie Railplane
- List of places in East Dunbartonshire
- List of places in Scotland
