= Campsie Fells =

Range of hills in central Scotland

Coordinates: 56°01′N 4°18′W

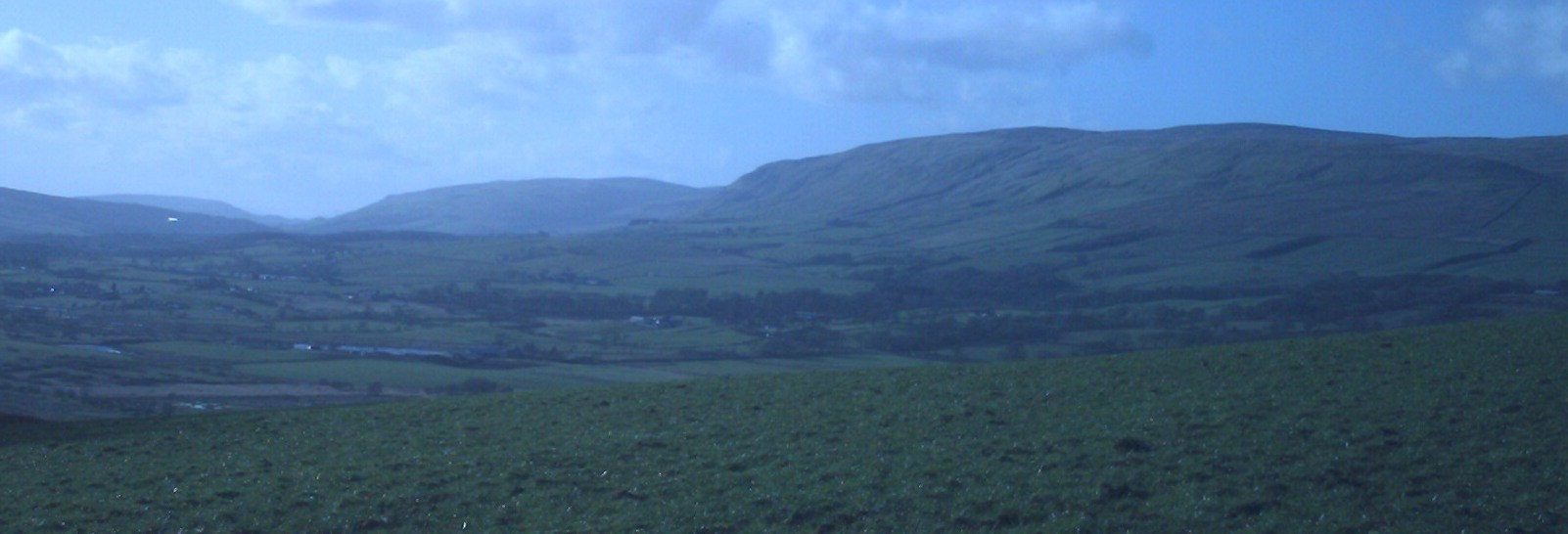
The Campsie Fells from Bar Hill above Twechar

The Campsie Fells (also known as the Campsies; Scottish Gaelic: Monadh Chamaisidh) are a range of hills in central Scotland, stretching east to west from Denny Muir to Dumgoyne in Stirlingshire and overlooking Strathkelvin to the south. The southern extent of the range falls within East Dunbartonshire. The range overlooks the villages of Strathblane, Blanefield, Milton of Campsie, Lennoxtown and Torrance to the south; Killearn to the west, and Fintry and Strathendrick to the north. The Fintry Hills lie further to the north; Kilpatrick Hills lie to the west and the Kilsyth Hills to the east.

== Walking ==
Earl's Seat is the highest point of the Campsie Fells, measuring 578 m (1,896 ft). On the top of Earl's Seat is a trig point. Two main ways of climbing Earl's Seat are by going past Dumgoyne from the Glengoyne Distillery or going up the Fin Glen from Clachan of Campsie.

== Etymology ==
The name is taken from one of the individual hills in the range, called Campsie; meaning "crooked fairy hill", from the Scottish Gaelic cam, meaning "crooked", and sìth meaning "fairy". "Fell" originates from the Old Norse word fjall, meaning "hill".

== Geology ==
The Clyde Plateau Volcanic Formation forms the higher ground in the Kilsyth Hills, the south-eastern portion of the range. This was the most extensive site of volcanic activity in the Central Lowlands of Scotland during the Lower Carboniferous (or Mississippian) era (approx. 359-323 Ma). Erosion along the line of a geological fault known as the Campsie Fault has left tiers of rock representing some 30 lava flows. The accumulation of trachybasaltic lavas and tephra deposits suggests activity was initially concentrated around volcanic vents in the north-east of the area, including at Gonachan Glen and Dungoil. Later, activity moved towards the Waterhead Central Volcanic Complex (near Meikle Bin), forming a central stratovolcano.

The headwaters of the River Carron rise in the Campsies.

== Cultural relevance ==
The Campsie Fells have cemented their place in history as the birthplace of Scottish skiing, when William W. Naismith of Glasgow skied the area, becoming the first ever man to ski in Scotland in March 1892. The Monty Python film Monty Python's The Meaning of Life used the Campsies as a location, standing in for Natal during the Anglo-Zulu War of 1879. On one day it was so cold that the extras acting as the Zulu warriors refused to put on their costumes and that day's filming was abandoned.
