= List of rivers of Scotland =

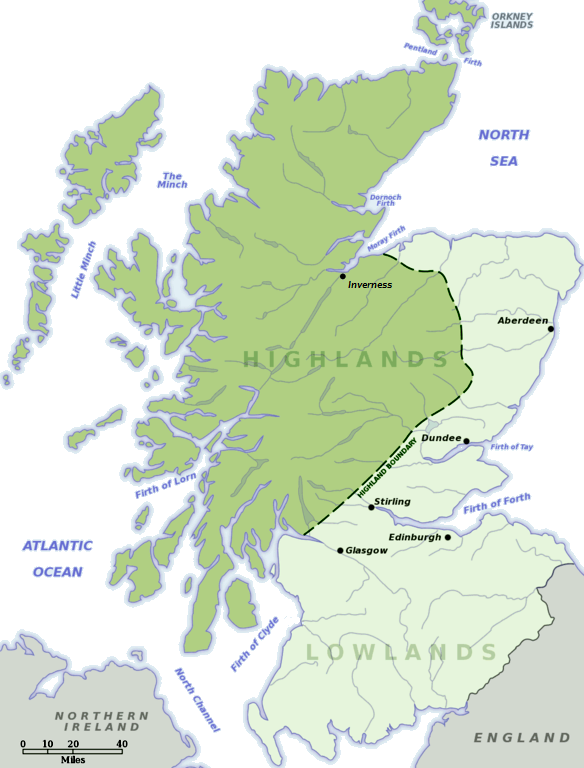
Major rivers can be seen in this map

This list of rivers in Scotland is organised geographically, taken anti-clockwise, from Berwick-upon-Tweed. Tributaries are listed down the page in an upstream loop direction. (L) indicates a left-bank tributary and (R) indicates a right-bank tributary whilst (Ls) and (Rs) indicate left and right forks where a named river is formed from two differently named rivers.

For simplicity, they are divided here by the coastal section in which the mouth of the river is located. Those on Scottish islands are listed separately. For Scottish estuaries, please see under firths and sea lochs.

The Scots have many words for watercourses.

- A "Water" (Lallans: "Watter", Scots Gaelic, "Uisge") is a smaller river, e.g. Ugie Water, Water of Leith etc. Many Scottish rivers incorporate the name "Water" traditionally.
- A "burn", Scots Gaelic: "allt" (anglicised as "Ault/alt"), used for smaller rivers and larger streams, also once widely used in England, now mostly in placenames especially the north, and sometimes spelled "bourne", e.g. Bournemouth and Ashbourne. In Scotland examples include Coalburn, Bannockburn, Aultmore.
- Abhainn in Gaelic meaning river, which is anglicised as Avon. There is also a similar Brythonic cognate. This sometimes leads to curious 'double' namings of rivers by Anglo-Saxon speakers, such as River Avon and River Afton (literally "River River").

== South-eastern Scotland ==
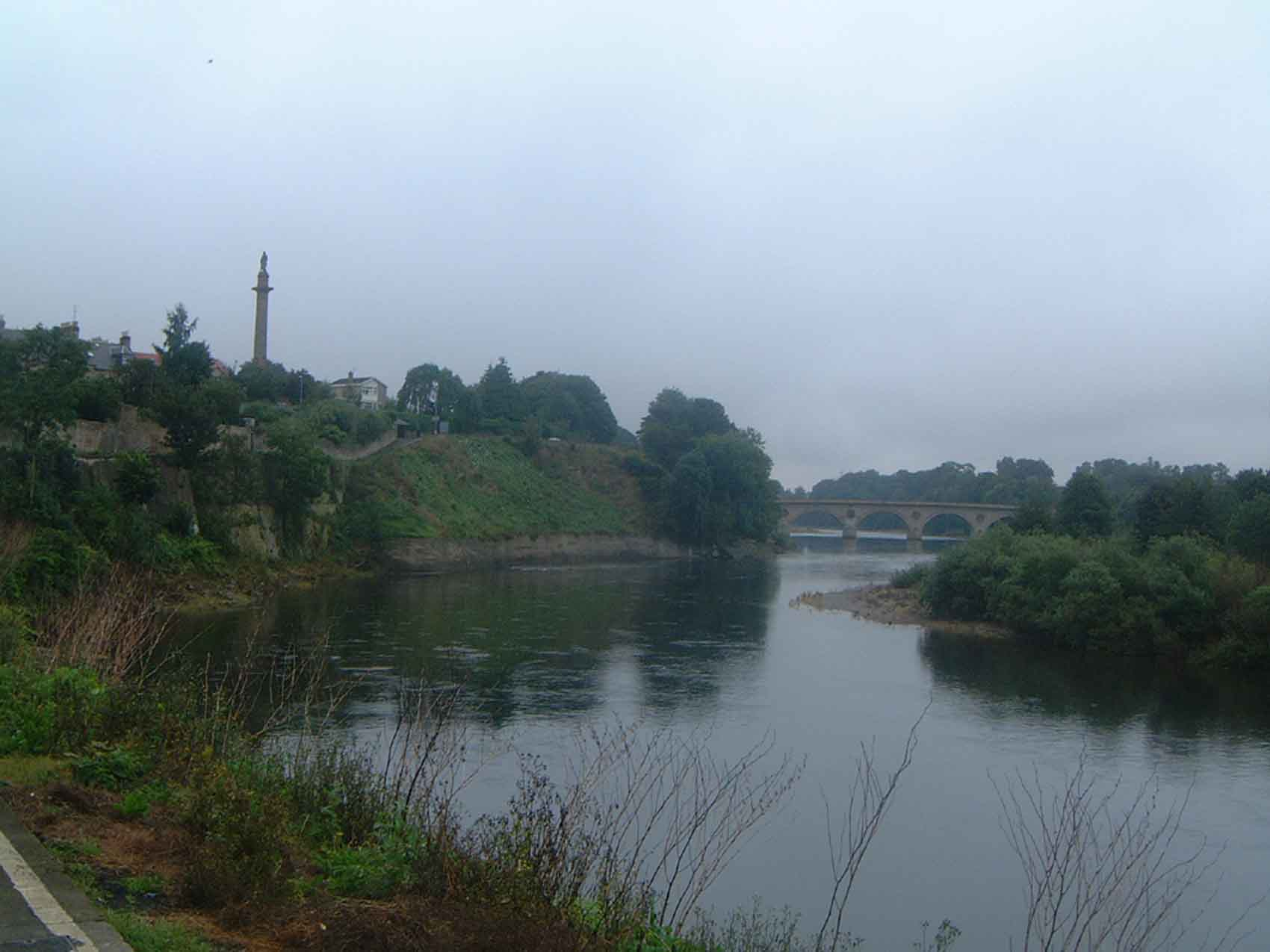
The River Tweed at Coldstream

Flowing into the North Sea between Berwick-upon-Tweed and Kincardine (East Coast)

The right-bank tributary of the Tweed, the River Till together with its tributaries, is almost wholly within England but is included for completeness of the Tweed catchment.

Tweed catchment

- River Tweed
  - Whiteadder Water (L)
    - Blackadder Water (R)
      - Langton Burn (L)
    - Monynut Water (L)
    - Dye Water (R)
    - Bothwell Water (L)
    - Faseny Water (R)
  - River Till (R) (England only) (is known as River Breamish in upper reaches)
    - River Glen (L), (England only)
      - Bowmont Water (Ls) (upper reaches in Scotland)
      - College Burn (Rs), (England only)
    - Wooler Water (L), (England only)
      - Carey Burn (Ls) (England only)
      - Harthope Burn (Rs) (England only)
    - Hetton Burn (R) (England only)
    - Lilburn Burn (Ls) (England only)
    - River Breamish (Rs) (England only)
      - Harelaw Burn (L) (England only)
      - Linhope Burn (L) (England only)
  - Leet Water (L)
  - Eden Water (L)
  - River Teviot (R)
    - Kale Water (R)
    - Oxnam Water (R)
    - Jed Water (R)
      - Black Burn (R)
    - Ale Water (L)
    - Rule Water (R)
    - Slitrig Water (R)
    - Borthwick Water (L)
    - Allan Water (R)
  - Leader Water (L)
    - Boondreigh Water (L)
    - Earnscleugh Water (L)
  - Darnick Burn (R)
  - Gala Water (L)
    - Heriot Water (R)
  - Ettrick Water (R)
    - Yarrow Water (L)
      - Megget Water (L) (enters St Mary's Loch)
    - Rankle Burn (R)
    - Tima Water (R)
  - Leithen Water (L)
  - Quair Water (R)
  - Eddleston Water (L)
  - Manor Water (R)
  - Lyne Water (L)
  - Holms Water (L)
    - Biggar Water (L)
  - Kingledoors Burn (L)
  - Talla Water (R)
  - Fruid Water (R)

Simple coastal catchments

- Eye Water
  - Ale Water (L)
- Biel Water

Tyne catchment

- River Tyne
  - Tyne Water (Ls)
  - Birns Water (Rs) (Humbie Water)

Firth of Forth (Estuary)

(Lothian) Esk catchment

- River Esk, Lothian
  - River South Esk (Rs)
    - Gore Water (R)
    - Dalhousie Burn
  - River North Esk (Ls)
  - Figgate Burn

Water of Leith catchment

- Water of Leith
  - The Stank

Almond catchment

- River Almond
  - Linhouse Water (R)
  - Breich Water (R)
  - Gogarburn

Avon catchment

- River Avon

Carron catchment

- River Carron
  - Bonny Water (R)
  - Earl's Burn (L)

== Forth to Tay ==
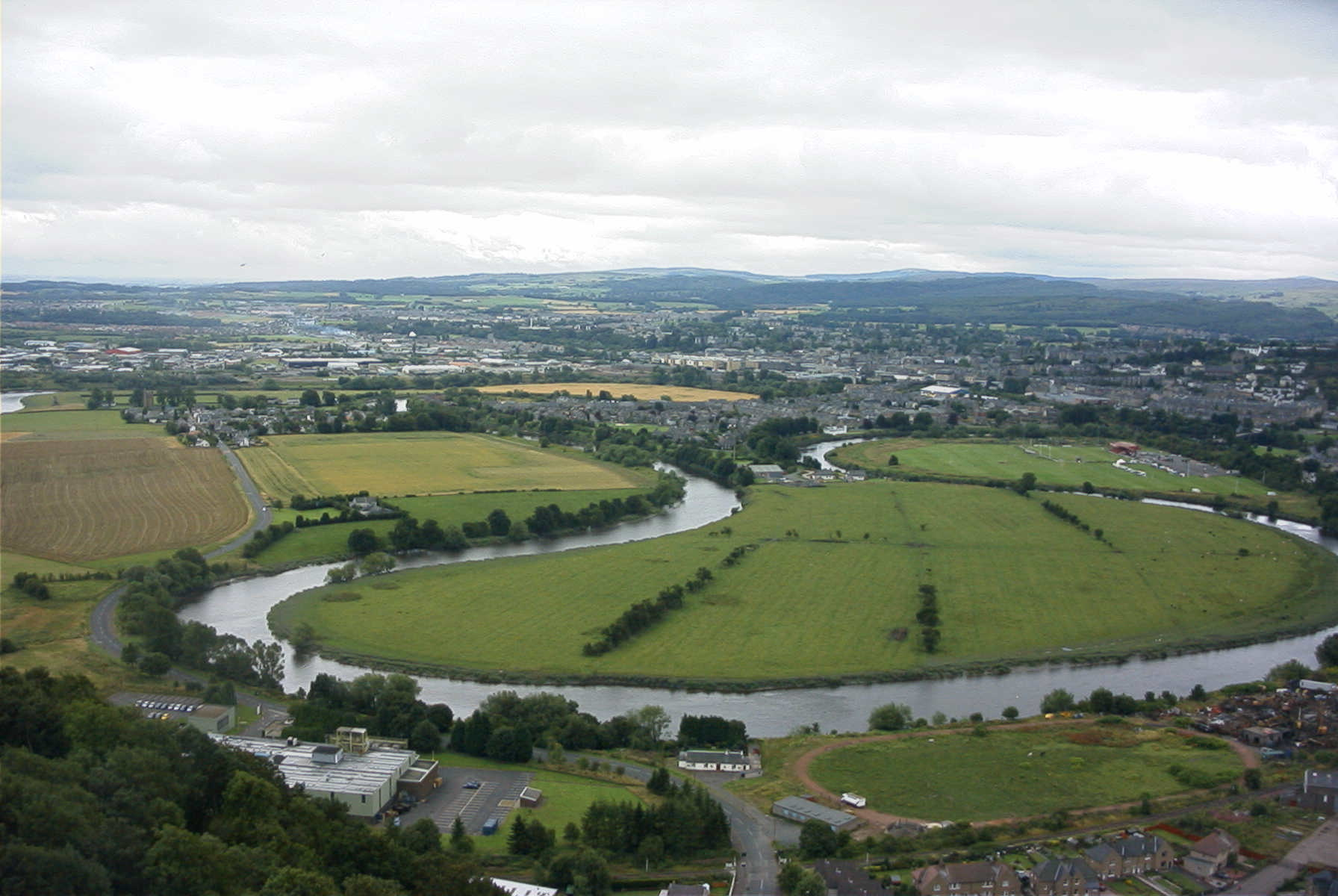
Meandering River Forth viewed from the Wallace Monument. The river flows from right to left, and the former limit of navigation was in the left distance.

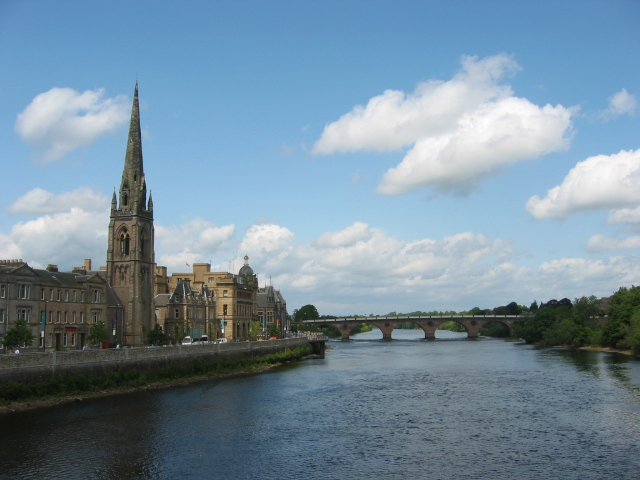
Looking upstream (north) along the River Tay from the centre of Perth

Flowing into the North Sea between Kincardine and Buddon Ness (East Coast)

Forth catchment

- River Forth
  - Pow Burn (R)
  - River Devon, Clackmannanshire (L)
  - Black Devon (L)
  - Bannock Burn (R)
  - Allan Water (L)
  - River Teith (L)
    - Ardoch Burn (L)
    - Keltie Water (L)
    - Garbh Uisge (Ls) (drains Loch Lubnaig)
    - Eas Gobhain (Rs) (drains Loch Venachar)
  - Goodie Water (L)
  - Kelty Water (R)
  - Duchray Water (R)

Simple coastal catchments

- River Leven, Fife
  - River Ore (R)
- Kenly Water
- Kinness Burn

Eden catchment

- River Eden, Fife
  - Motray Water (L)
  - Ceres Burn (R)

Tay catchment

- River Tay
  - River Earn (L)
    - River Farg (R)
    - Water of May (R)
    - Ruthven Water (R)
    - Machany Water (R)
    - Shaggie Burn (L)
      - Turret Burn (R)
    - River Lednock (L)
    - Water of Ruchill (R)
    - Burn of Ample (R) (flows into Loch Earn)
    - Kendrum Burn (R) (flows into Loch Earn)
      - Allt Srath a' Ghlinne (L)
  - Annaty Burn (L)
  - River Almond, Perthshire (R)
  - Shochie Burn (R)
    - Ordie Burn (L)
  - River Isla, Perthshire (L)
    - Coupar Burn (L)
    - Lunan Burn (R)
      - Cattymill Burn (flows into Loch of Drumellie) (L)
      - Den Burn (flows into Loch of Clunie) (R)
      - Pott Burn (flows into Loch of Clunie) (R)
      - Buckny Burn (L)
      - Cardney Burn (flows into Loch of Butterstone (next to Loch of the lowes)) (L)
      - Leddown Burn (L)
    - River Ericht (L)
      - Lornty Burn (R)
      - Shee Water (known as Black Water in its lower reaches) (Ls)
        - Allt a' Ghlinne Bhig (L)
        - Glen Lochsie Burn (R)
      - River Ardle (Rs)
        - Allt Fearnach (Ls)
        - Brerachan Water (Rs)
    - Dean Water (R)
    - Alyth Burn (R)
    - Melgam Water (L)
  - River Braan (R)
    - Ballinloan Burn (L)
    - Cochill Burn (L)
    - River Quaich (flows into Loch Freuchie)
  - River Tummel (L)
    - River Garry (L)
      - Allt Girnaig (L)
      - River Tilt (L)
        - Tarf Water (R)
      - Errochty Water (R)
      - Edendon Water (L)
    - Allt Camghouran (R) (enters Loch Rannoch)
    - River Ericht (L)
    - River Gaur (enters Loch Rannoch)
      - Abhainn Duibhe (R)
      - Allt Chaldar (L)
      - Allt Eigheach (L) (enters Loch Eigheach)
      - Garbh Ghaoir (enters Loch Eigheach)
        - Abhainn Bà (enters Loch Laidon) (known as River Bà upstream of Loch Bà)
      - Bruar Water (L)??
  - River Lyon (L)
    - Keltney Burn (L) (upper reaches known as Allt Mor)
    - Allt Conait (L)
  - River Lochay (Ls) (enters Loch Tay)
  - River Dochart (Rs) (enters Loch Tay)

Simple coastal catchments

- Dighty Water
- Buddon Burn

== East Coast ==
Flowing into the North Sea between Buddon Ness and Rattray Head

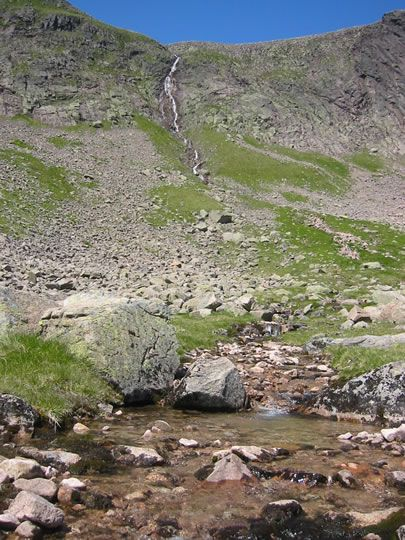
Falls of Dee, An Garbh Choire

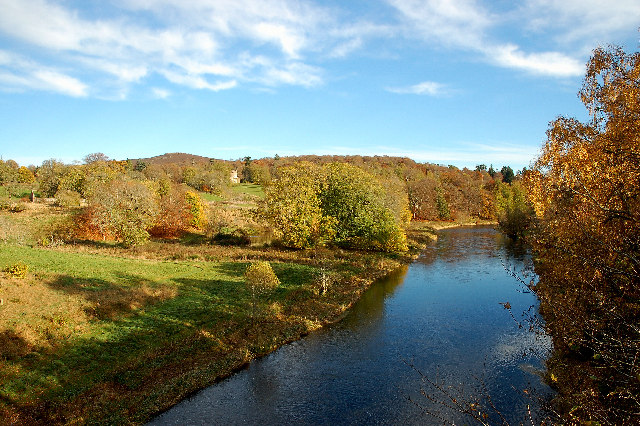
River Don near Alford

Simple coastal catchments

- Barry Burn (upper reaches known as Pitairlie Burn)
- Lochty Burn
- Monikie Burn
- Elliot Water
  - Rottenraw Burn
- Brothock Burn
- Keilor Burn
- Lunan Water

River South Esk catchment

- River South Esk
  - Noran Water (L)
  - Prosen Water (R)
  - Burn of Glenmoye (L)
  - White Water (R)

River North Esk catchment

- River North Esk
  - Luther Water (L)
  - West Water (R) (upper reaches known as Water of Saughs)
  - Water of Tarf (L)
  - Water of Mark (Ls)
  - Water of Lee (Rs)

Simple coastal catchments

- Bervie Water
- Carron Water, Aberdeenshire
- Cowie Water
  - Burn of Monboys
  - Cowton Burn
- Burn of Muchalls
- Burn of Pheppie
- Burn of Elsick
- Burn of Findon

Dee catchment

- River Dee, Aberdeenshire
  - Crynoch Burn (R)
    - Cairnie Burn (L)
  - Gormack Burn (L)
    - Leuchar Burn (L)
  - Burn of Sheeoch (R)
  - Water of Feugh (R)
  - Beltie Burn (L)
  - Burn of Canny (L)
  - Tarland Burn (L)
  - Water of Tanar (R)
  - Tullich Burn (L)
  - River Muick (R)
  - River Gairn (L)
    - Glenfenzie Burn (L) (minor)
  - Girnock Burn (R)
  - Clunie Water (R)
    - Callater Burn (R)
    - Quoich Water (L)
    - Ey Burn (R)
    - Lui Water (L)
      - Derry Burn (Ls)
      - Luibeg Burn (Rs)
  - Geldie Burn (R)

Don catchment

- River Don, Aberdeenshire
  - Elrick Burn (L)
  - River Ury (L) (sometimes written River Urie)
    - Gadie Burn (minor?)
  - Ton Burn (R)
  - Birks Burn (minor?)
  - Mossat Burn (L)
  - Kindie Burn (L)
  - Water of Buchat (L)
  - Deskry Burn (R)
  - Water of Nochty (L)
  - Ernan Water (L)
  - Water of Carvie (R) (minor)

Simple coastal catchments

- Blackdog Burn
- Potterton Burn
  - Millden Burn ??
- Eigie Burn ??
- Blairton Burn ??
- Menie Burn ??
- Sandend Burn ??

Ythan catchment

- River Ythan
  - Tarty Burn (R)
  - Ebrie Burn (L)
  - Little Water (L)
  - Fordoun Burn (R)

Simple coastal catchments

- Water of Cruden
- River Ugie
  - South Ugie Water (Rs)
    - Burn of Fedderate (L)
  - North Ugie Water (Ls)
- Cuttie Burn (?minor)
- Black Water (?minor)

== Moray Firth (north-facing coast) ==
Flowing into the North Sea between Rattray Head and Inverness

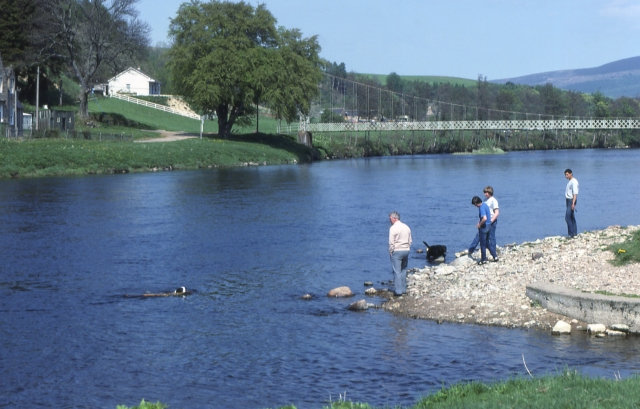
River Spey at Aberlour

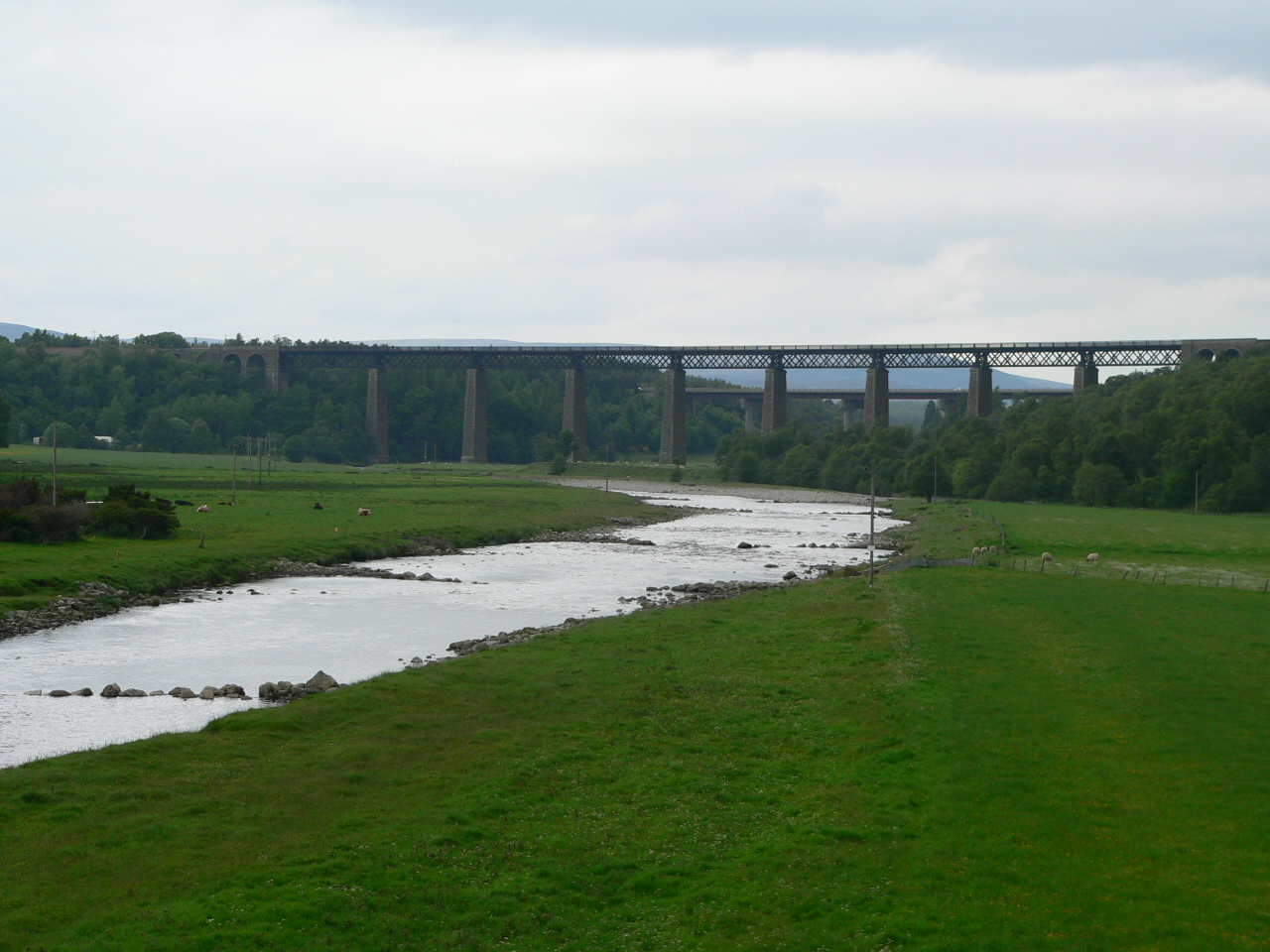
The River Findhorn is crossed by the Highland Main Line railway and the A9 road just east of Tomatin

Simple coastal catchments

- Water of Philorth
- Pouk Burn
- The Dour
- Tore Burn

Deveron catchment

- River Deveron
  - Idoch Water (R)
  - Burn of Forgue (R)
  - River Isla, Moray (L)
    - Burn of Cairnie (R)
    - Burn of Davidston (R)
  - River Bogie (R)

Simple coastal catchments

- Burn of Boyndie
- Burn of Boyne
- Burn of Durn
- Burn of Fordyce
- Cullen Burn
  - Burn of Deskford
  - Glen Burn
- Burn of Buckie
- Burn of Tynet

Spey catchment

- River Spey
  - Burn of Fochabers (R)
  - Burn of Rothes (L)
  - River Fiddich (R)
    - Dullan Water (L)
  - Knockando Burn (L)
  - Allt Arder (L)
  - Allt a' Ghealaidh (L)
  - River Avon
    - River Livet (R)
    - Burn of Lochy (L) ('Burn of Brown' above Bridge of Brown)
    - Conglass Water (R)
    - Water of Ailnack (L) (known as Water of Caiplich in its upper reaches)
  - River Dulnain (L)
  - River Nethy (R)
    - Dorback Burn (R)
  - River Druie (R)
    - River Luineag (R)
    - Am Beanaidh (L)
  - River Feshie (R)
    - Allt Chomhraig (L)
    - River Eidart (R)
  - River Tromie (R)
  - Allt Mor (L)
  - River Calder (L)
  - River Truim (R)
  - River Mashie (R)
  - Markie Burn (L)

Lossie catchment

- River Lossie
  - Black Burn (L)
  - Leanoch Burn (R)

Findhorn catchment

- River Findhorn
  - Burn of Mosset (R) (drains into Findhorn Bay)
  - Muckle Burn (R) (drains into Findhorn Bay)
  - Dorback Burn (R)
    - River Divie (R)
  - Leonach Burn (R)
    - Rhilean Burn (L)
  - Funtack Burn (L) ('Moy Burn' above Loch Moy)
  - Glen Mazeran (L)??
  - Elrick Burn (R)
  - River Eskin (L)

Nairn catchment

- River Nairn
  - Allt Dearg (R)
    - Riereach Burn (R)
  - River Farnack (R)

Ness catchment

- River Ness
  - River Farigaig (R) (flows into Loch Ness)
  - River Enrick (L) (flows into Loch Ness)
  - River Coiltie (L) (flows into Loch Ness)
  - River Foyers (R) (flows into Loch Ness)
    - River Fechlin (L)
      - Allt Breineag (L)
    - River E (L) (flows into Loch Mhòr)
  - River Moriston (L) (flows into Loch Ness)
    - Allt Bhlaraidh (L)
    - River Doe (L)
    - River Loyne (R)
  - Allt Doe (R) (flows into Loch Ness)
  - River Oich (L)? (flows into Loch Ness)
    - River Garry (flows into Loch Oich)
  - River Tarff (R) (flows into Loch Ness)

== Moray Firth (east-facing coast) ==
Flowing into the North Sea between Inverness and Duncansby Head (East Coast)

Moniack catchment

- Moniack Burn (flows into Beauly Firth)

Beauly catchment

- River Beauly
  - Belladrum Burn (R)
  - Bruiach Burn (R)
  - Breakachy Burn (L)
    - River Farrar (Ls)
    - River Glass (Rs)
      - River Cannich (L)
      - River Affric (L)
      - Abhainn Deabhag (R)

Conon catchment

- River Conon
  - River Orrin (R)
    - Allt Goibhre (R)
  - Black Water (L)
  - River Meig (R)

Simple coastal catchments

- River Peffery
- River Sgitheach
- Allt Graad (or River Glass, known as Abhainn Beinn nan Eun above Loch Glass)
  - Allt nan Caorach (R)
- River Averon (also known as River Alness) (known as Abhainn na Glasa above Loch Morie)
  - Black Water (L)
- Balnagown River (known as Strathrory River upstream)
- River Tain (flows into Dornoch Firth)
- Wester Fearn Burn (flows into Dornoch Firth)

Carron catchment

- River Carron (flows into Kyle of Sutherland/Dornoch Firth)
  - Black Water (L) (known in upper reaches as Abhainn an t-Srath Chuileannaidh)
  - Water of Glencalvie (R) (Diebidale River in its upper reaches)
    - Alladale River (Ls)
    - Abhainn a' Ghlinne Mhoir (Rs) (known as Abhainn a' Ghlinne Bhig in its upper reaches)

Oykel catchment

- River Oykel (flows into Kyle of Sutherland)
  - River Cassley (L)
  - River Einig (R) (upper reaches are known as Rappach Water)
    - Abhainn Dubhag (R) (upper reaches are known as Corriemulzie River)

Shin catchment

- River Shin (flows into Kyle of Sutherland)
  - Grudie Burn (R)
  - River Tirry (L) (flows into Loch Shin)
  - River Fiag (L) (flows into Loch Shin)
  - Merkland River (L) (flows into Loch Shin via Loch a' Ghriama)

Simple coastal catchments

- River Evelix
- River Fleet
  - Abhainn an t-Sratha Charnaig (R)
  - Lettie River (L) (also known as Abhainn Leataidh)
- Golspie Burn

Brora catchment

- River Brora
  - Black Water (L)
    - River Skinsdale (L)

Simple coastal catchments

- River Loth ?
- River Helmsdale (River Ullie)
  - Abhainn na Frithe (R)
  - Bannock Burn (L)
- Berriedale Water
  - Langwell Water (R)
- Dunbeath Water

Wick catchment

- Wick River
  - Strath Burn (R)
    - Scouthal Burn (L)
- Burn of Lyth

== North Coast ==
Flowing into the Atlantic Ocean between Dunnet Head and Cape Wrath

Thurso catchment

- River Thurso
  - Little River, Highland
  - Sleach Water (L) (flows into Loch More)

Simple coastal catchments

- Forss Water (known by several other names upstream of Loch Shurrery)
- Achvarasdal Burn
- Sandside Burn
- Halladale River
  - River Dyke (L)
- River Strathy
- Armadale Burn
- River Naver
- River Borgie (known as Allt Dionach-caraidh and Lon Achadh na h-Aibhne above Loch Loyal)
- Kinloch River

Hope catchment

- River Hope (known as Strathmore River above Loch Hope)
  - Glen Golly River (Ls)
  - Abhainn Srath Coir' an Easaidh (Rs)

Simple coastal catchments

- Amhainn an t-Sratha Bhig
- River Dionard
- Daill River
- Kearvaig River

== North-west Highlands ==
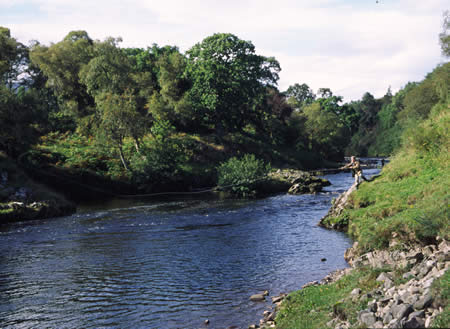
Fly fishing on the River Carron, Wester Ross

Flowing into the Atlantic Ocean between Cape Wrath and Corpach at the head of Loch Linnhe

Simple coastal catchments

- Keisgaig River (minor)
- Sandwood River
- Rhiconich River
- River Laxford
- River Inver
  - River Traligill (flows into Loch Assynt)
  - River Loanan (flows into Loch Assynt)
- Abhainn Bad na h-Achlaise (known as Abhainn na Clach Airigh upstream)

Kirkaig catchment

- River Kirkaig
  - Abhainn a' Chrocain (L) (flows into Loch Veyatie)
  - Abhainn Mor (R) (flows into Loch Veyatie)
    - Ledmore River (flows into Cam Loch)
      - Ledbeg River (R)

Simple coastal catchments

- River Polly
- River Canaird (or Kanaird)
  - River Runie (R)
- Ullapool River (known as Rhidorroch River upstream of Loch Achall and River Douchary further upstream)
- River Lael
- River Broom
  - Abhainn Cuileig (Ls)
  - Abhainn Droma (Rs)
- Dundonnell River
- Gruinard River (Abhainn Srath na Sealga upstream of Loch na Sealga)
  - Allt Loch a Ghiubhsachan (L)
- Inverianvie River
- Little Gruinard River

Ewe catchment

- River Ewe
  - River Talladale (L) (flows into Loch Maree)
  - River Grudie (L) (flows into Loch Maree)
  - Abhainn an Fhasaigh (R) (flows into Loch Maree)
  - Kinlochewe River (flows into Loch Maree)
    - A' Ghairbhe (Ls)
    - Abhainn Bruachaig (Rs)

Simple coastal catchments

- River Sand
- River Kerry
- Badachro River (known as Abhainn Braigh-horrisdale upstream of Loch Braigh Horrisdale)
- River Erradale
- Craig River
- River Torridon
- River Balgy
- River Applecross
- River Toscaig
- River Kishorn
- River Carron (Wester Ross)
  - Fionn Abhainn (R)
  - River Lair (R)
- River Taodail
- River Attadale
- River Ling
  - Uisge Dubh (or Black Water)
- River Elchaig
  - Allt a' Ghlomaich (L)
- River Glennan (minor)
- River Croe (Wester Ross)
  - Abhainn Chonaig (R)
- River Shiel
- Glenmore River
- Abhainn a' Ghlinne Bhig
- River Arnisdale
- River Barrisdale
- Abhainn Inbhir Ghuiserein
- Inverie River
- River Carnach
- River Morar
  - River Meoble (L) (flows into Loch Morar)
- River Ailort
- River Moidart

Shiel catchment

- River Shiel
  - River Polloch (L) (flows into Loch Shiel)
  - Glenalladale River (R) (flows into Loch Shiel)
  - River Finna (R) (flows into head of Loch Shiel)
  - Callop River (L) (flows into head of Loch Shiel)

Simple coastal catchments

- Glenmore River
- Strontian River
- Carnoch River
- Glencripesdale Burn
- Kinloch River
- Barr River
- Savary River

Aline catchment

- River Aline
  - Abhainn a' Ghlinne Ghil (Ls)
  - Black Water (Rs)

Simple coastal catchments

- Rannoch River
- Glensanda River (minor)
- River Tarbert
- River Gour
- River Scaddle
- Cona River
- Garvan River
  - South Garvan River (Rs)
  - North Garvan River (Ls)
- Dubh Lighe
- Fionn Lighe
- An t-Suileag

== South-west Highlands ==
Flowing into the Atlantic Ocean between Corpach at the head of Loch Linnhe and the Mull of Kintyre

- River Lochy
  - River Lundy (L)
  - River Loy (R)
  - River Spean (L)
    - The Cour (L)
    - River Roy (R)
    - River Treig (L)
      - Allt na Lairige (flows into Loch Treig)
      - Abhainn Rath (flows into Loch Treig)
    - Abhainn Ghuilbinn (L) (River Ossian upstream of Loch Ghuilbinn)
    - River Pattack (flows into Loch Laggan)
  - River Arkaig (R) (flows into Loch Lochy)
    - River Mallie (R) (flows into Loch Arkaig)
  - River Gloy (L) (flows into Loch Lochy)
- River Nevis (known as Water of Nevis upstream)
- River Kiachnish
- Abhainn Righ
- River Leven (West Highlands)
  - Allt na Caim (R) (flows into Blackwater Reservoir)
  - Black Water (flows into Blackwater Reservoir)
- River Coe
- River Duror
- River Creran
  - River Ure (L)
- River Esragan
- River Etive
  - River Coupall (R)
- River Kinglass
- River Liver
- River Noe

Awe catchment

- River Awe
  - River Orchy (flows into Loch Awe)
    - River Strae (R)
    - River Lochy (L)
    - Allt Kinglass (R)
      - Water of Tulla (L) (flows into Loch Tulla)
      - Abhainn Shira (R) (flows into Loch Tulla)
  - Archan River (R)
    - Keppochan River (L)
  - River Avich (L) (flows into Loch Awe)
  - Kames River (R) (flow into Loch Awe)
  - River Liever (L) (flows into Loch Awe)

Simple coastal catchments

- River Nant
- Feochan
  - Feochan Mhor or River Nell (Rs)
  - Feochan Bheag (Ls)
- River Euchar
- River Oude
- Barbreck River
- River Add
  - Kilmartin Burn (R)
- Abhainn na Cuile
- Bardaravine River
- Barr Water
- Machrihanish Water

== Firth of Clyde ==
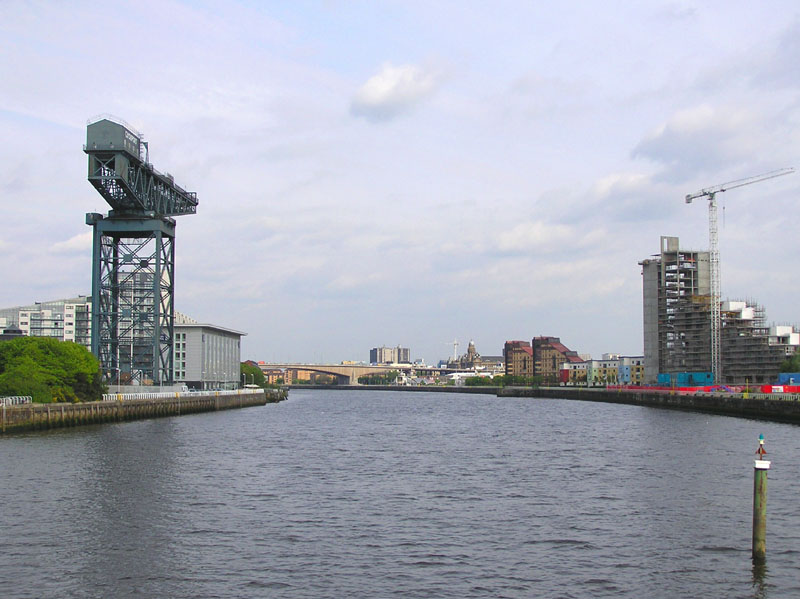
The Clyde flowing through Glasgow. The Finnieston Crane on the left is seen as a lasting symbol of the industrial heritage of the Clyde.

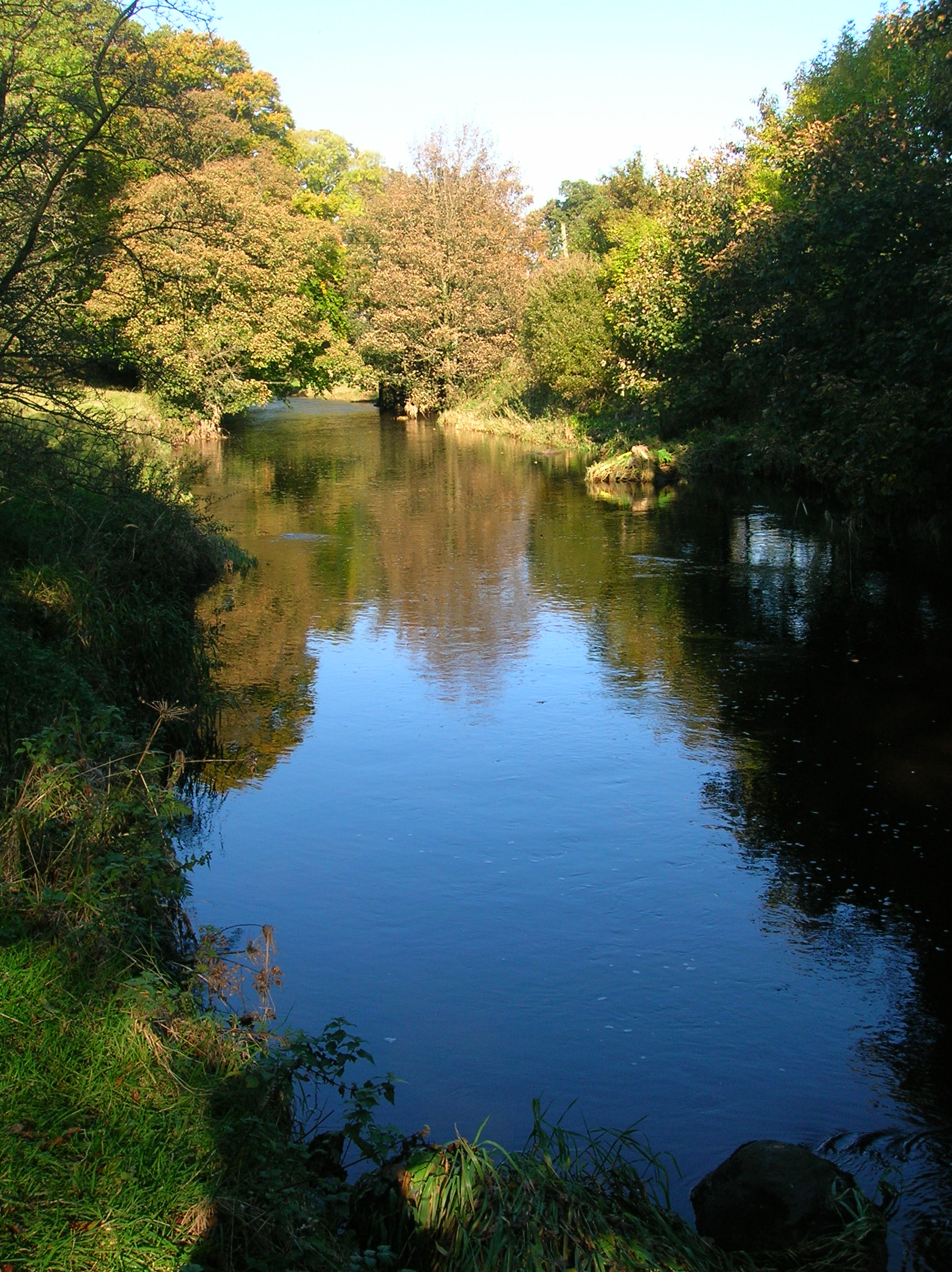
The Annick Water near Cunninghamhead mill

Rivers discharging into the Firth of Clyde between the Mull of Kintyre and Mull of Galloway. Rivers on Arran are found in the islands section.

Simple coastal catchments

- Balgaidh Burn (Dunoon, Cowal Peninsula)
- Berry Burn (Dunoon)
- Milton Burn
- Breackerie Water
- Conie Water
- Glenlussa Water
- Saddell Water
- Carradale Water
- Claonaig Water
- Skipness River
- Leacann Water
- Douglas Water
- River Aray
- River Shira
- River Fyne
- Kinglas Water
- Kilfinan Burn (Cowal Peninsula)
- River Auchalick
- River Ruel
- River Eachaig
  - River Massan (R)
  - River Cur (flows into Loch Eck)
- River Finart (Loch Long, Cowal Peninsula)
- River Goil
- Croe Water
- Loin Water

Clyde catchment

- River Clyde
  - River Leven (R)
    - Fruin Water (R) (flows into Loch Lomond)
    - Endrick Water (L) (flows into Loch Lomond)
      - Blane Water (L)
    - Luss Water (R) (flows into Loch Lomond)
    - Douglas Water (R) (flows into Loch Lomond)
    - Inveruglas Water (R) (flows into Loch Lomond)
    - River Falloch (flows into head of Loch Lomond)
      - Dubh Eas (R)
  - River Cart
    - Black Cart Water (L)
      - River Gryffe (L)
        - Gryfe Water (Ls)
        - Green Water (Rs)
    - White Cart Water (L)
      - Levern Water (L)
        - Brock Burn
      - Auldhouse Burn
        - Broom Burn
        - Capelrig Burn
      - Kittoch Water
      - Earn Water
      - Brackenrig Burn
      - Borland Burn
      - Polnoon Water
  - River Kelvin (R)
    - Allander Water (R)
      - Pow Burn (L)
        - Craigmaddie Burn (into the head of Dougalston Loch which drains into the Pow Burn)
          - Tinker's Burn (R)
      - Craigdhu Burn (R)
        - Manse Burn (R)
      - Tannoch Burn (L)
      - Craigton Burn (R)
        - Cauldstream Burn (L)
      - Lecher Burn (Ls)
      - Auldmurroch Burn (Rs)
    - Branziet Burn (R)
    - Bishopbriggs Burn (L)
    - Tower Burn (R)
    - Red Burn (R)
      - Shaw Burn (R)
    - Park Burn (L)
    - Luggie Water (L)
      - Bothlin Burn (L)
        - Garnkirk Burn (L)
      - Mollins Burn (L)
      - Moss Water (R)
      - Gain Burn (L)
        - Deer Burn (R)
      - Shank Burn (L)
      - Cameron Burn (L)
    - Glazert Water (R)
      - Waltry Burn (L)
        - Burniebrae Burn (L)
        - Spouthead Burn (R)
          - Red Cleuch Burn (L)
          - Forking Burn (L)
      - Boyd's Burn (R)
      - Kirk Burn (Ls) (also referred to as the Aldessan Burn on some maps)
        - Heron Burn (R)
        - Alvain Burn (R)
        - Alnwick Burn (L)
          - Nineteentimes Burn (R)
            - Priest Burn (R)
            - Newhouse Burn (R)
          - Shearer's Burn (L)
          - Katrine's Burn (Rs)
          - Back Burn (Ls)
            - Whitestone Burn (L)
      - Finglen Burn (Rs)
        - Pow Burn (R)
        - Almeel Burn (L)
          - Alfagie Burn (R)
          - Burn of Blackdyke (L)
        - Horse Burn (R)
        - Almarnock Burn (L)
        - Altmarrage Burn (R)
        - Earl's Burn (R)
        - Flaughter Burn (L)
        - Cooper's Gote (L)
    - Board Burn (L)
      - Moss Water (R)
    - Cast Burn (R)
      - Wood Burn (R)
    - Queenzie Burn (R)
    - Dock Water (R)
    - Garrell Burn (R)
      - Ebroch Burn (L)
        - Colzium Burn (L)
      - Bachille Burn (R)
      - Birken Burn (R)
    - Shawend Burn
      - Banton Burn (flows into Banton Loch which drains into Shawend Burn when not feeding the Forth and Clyde Canal)
        - Brambler Burn (R)
          - Drum Burn (R)
        - Craigdouffie Burn (L)
    - Back Drain (L)
  - Rotten Calder Water (L)
  - North Calder Water (R)
  - South Calder Water (R)
  - Avon Water (L)
    - Cander Water (R)
    - Glengavel Water (R)
  - River Nethan (L)
  - Mouse Water (R)
  - Douglas Water (L)
  - Medwin Water
    - North Medwin (Rs)
    - South Medwin (Ls)
  - Duneaton Water (L)
    - Snar Water (R)
  - Camps water (R)
  - Glengonnar Water (L)
  - Elvan Water (L)
  - Daer Water
    - Portrail Water (L)

Simple coastal catchments

- Noddsdale Water
- Gogo Water

Garnock catchment

- River Garnock
  - Lugton Water (L)
  - Rye Water (R)

Irvine catchment

- River Irvine
  - Annick Water (R)
  - Fenwick Water (R)
    - Craufurdland Water (R)
  - Cessnock Water (L)

Ayr catchment

- River Ayr
  - Water of Coyle (L)
  - Lugar Water (L)
    - Burnock Water (L)
    - Bellow Water (Rs)
    - Glenmuir Water (Ls)
      - Guelt Water (L)
  - Greenock Water (R)

Doon catchment

- River Doon
  - Carrick Lane (L) (flows into Loch Doon)
    - Whitespout Lane (Ls)
    - Eglin Lane (Rs)
    - Gala Lane (flows into head of Loch Doon)

Simple coastal catchments

- Water of Girvan
- River Stinchar
  - Water of Tig (L)
  - Duisk River (L)

== Solway Firth ==
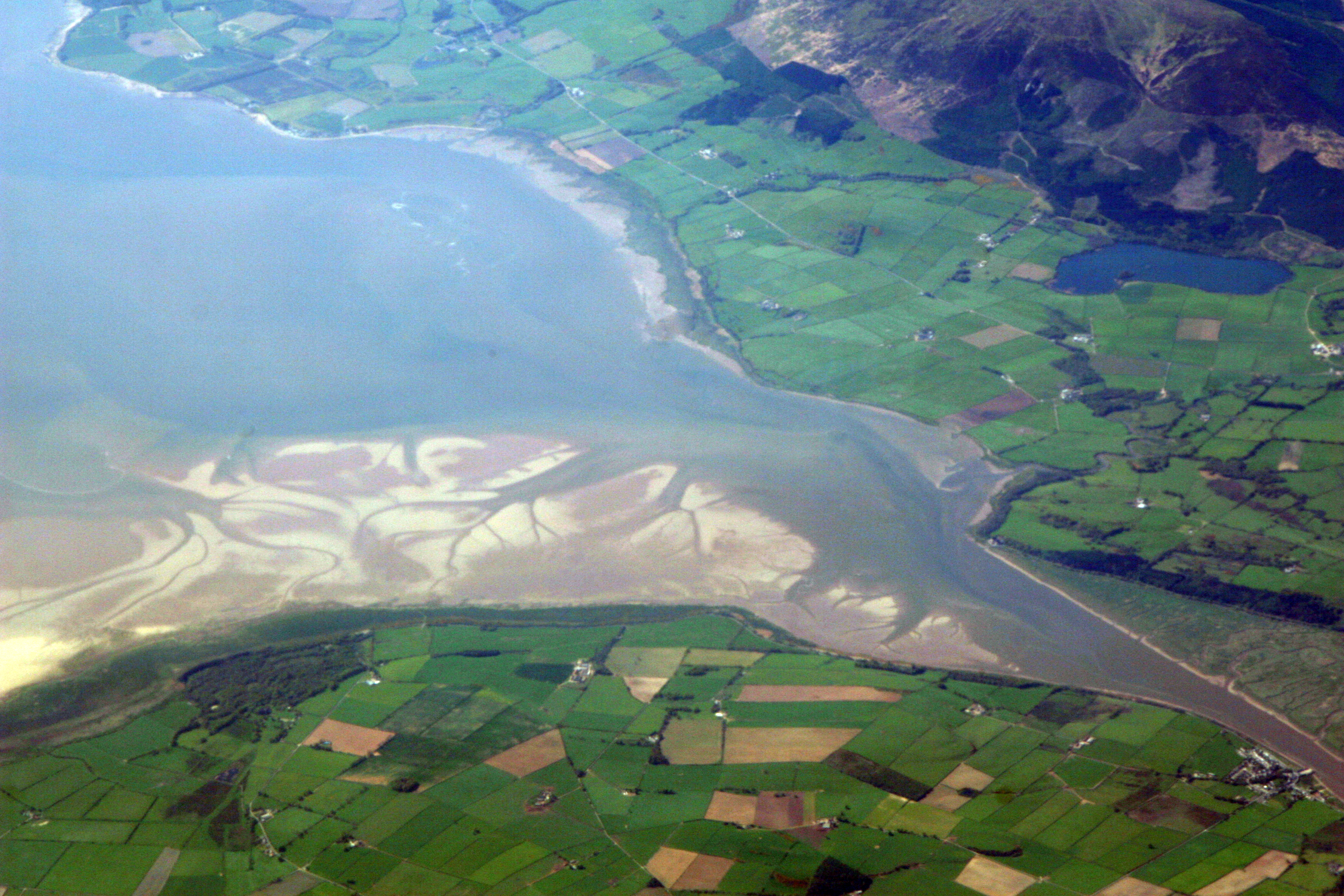
The estuary of the River Nith, opening into Solway Firth south of Dumfries

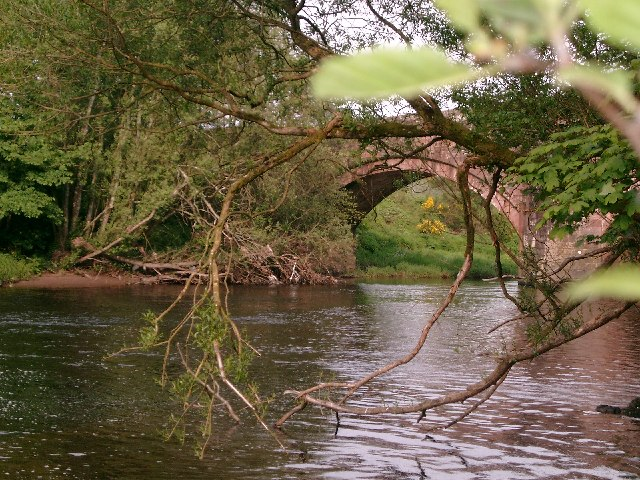
Hoddom Bridge, River Annan

Mull of Galloway to Gretna; rivers flowing into the Irish Sea and Solway Firth

Water of Luce catchment

- Water of Luce
  - Main Water of Luce (Rs)
  - Cross water of Luce (Ls)

Bladnoch catchment

- River Bladnoch
  - Tarf Water (R)
  - Black Burn (R)

Cree catchment

- River Cree
  - Palnure Burn (L)
  - Penkiln Burn (L)
  - Water of Minnoch (L)
    - Water of Trool (L)
- Moneypool Burn

Water of Fleet catchment

- Water of Fleet
- Skyre Burn (R)
  - Little Water of Fleet (Ls)
  - Big Water of Fleet (Rs)

Dee catchment

- River Dee (known also as 'Black Water of Dee' above confluence with Water of Ken)
  - Tarff Water (R)
  - Water of Ken (L)
    - Polharrow Burn (R)
    - Water of Deugh (R)
      - Carsphairn Lane (R)

Urr catchment

- Urr Water
  - Kirkgunzeon Lane (L)

Nith catchment

- River Nith
  - New Abbey Pow (R)
  - Cargen Water (R)
  - Cluden Water (R)
    - Cairn Water (Ls)
      - Castlefairn Water (Rs)
      - Dalwhat Water (Ls)
    - Old Water (Rs)
  - Scaur Water (R) (or Scar Water)
    - Shinnel Water (R)
  - Cample Water (L)
  - Carron Water (L)
  - Mennock Water (L)
  - Cairn Water??
  - Euchan Water (R)
  - Crawick Water (L)
    - Wanlock Water (Ls)
    - Spango Water (Rs)

Minor catchment

- Lochar Water

Annan catchment

- River Annan
  - Mein Water (L)
  - Water of Milk (L)
    - Corrie Water (R)
  - Dryfe Water (L)
  - Kinnel Water (R)
    - Water of Ae (R)
      - Capel Water (R)
    - Broadshaw Water (R)
  - Wamphray Water (L)
  - Moffat Water (L)
  - Evan Water (R)

(Border) Esk catchment

- River Esk, Dumfries and Galloway (also known as 'Border' Esk)
  - Kirtle Water (R) (enters tidal section)
  - River Sark (R) (straddles the border in its lower reaches, enters tidal section)
  - River Lyne (L)
  - Liddel Water (L)
    - Kershope Burn (L)
    - Hermitage Water (R)
      - Roughley Burn (L)
      - Whitrope Burn (L)
  - Tarras Water (L)
  - Wauchope Water (R)
  - Ewes Water (L)
  - Meggat Water (L)
    - White Esk (Ls)
    - Garwald Water (R)
    - Black Esk (Rs)

Further tributaries of the Esk lie wholly in England - see List of rivers of England.

== Rivers on Scottish islands ==
Most of the Scottish islands are too small to maintain watercourses of any great length or size, and are frequently indented by numerous long bays and inlets which further break up the landscape. However a disproportionate number of their watercourses bear the name 'river', though many are relatively tiny.

=== Arran ===
The numerous small watercourses on Arran are listed anticlockwise from Brodick.

- Glencloy Water
- Glenrosa Water
- South Sannox Burn
- North Sannox Burn
- Abhainn Mór
- Iorsa Water
- Machrie Water
- Black Water (upper reaches known as Clauchan Water)
- Sliddery Water
- Torrylinn Water (also known as Kilmory Water)
- Benlister Burn
- Glenashdale Burn (also known as Allt Delphin)

=== Skye and the Inner Hebrides ===
Islay

There are numerous watercourses on Islay, many of which though short are termed 'rivers'. They are listed anticlockwise from Port Askaig.

- Doodilmore River
- Gortanaoid River
- Saligo River
- River Drolsay
- River Sorn
- River Laggan
  - Duich River (L) (upper reaches known as Torra River)
  - Kilennan River (L)
  - Barr River
- Machrie River
  - Glenegedale River (L)
- Kintra River
- Kilbride River
- Ardilistry River
- Kintour River
- Claggain River

Jura

There are numerous watercourses on Jura, some of which though short are termed 'rivers'. They are listed anticlockwise from Feolin Ferry.

- Corran River
- Lussan River
- Shian River
- Glenbatrick River

Mull

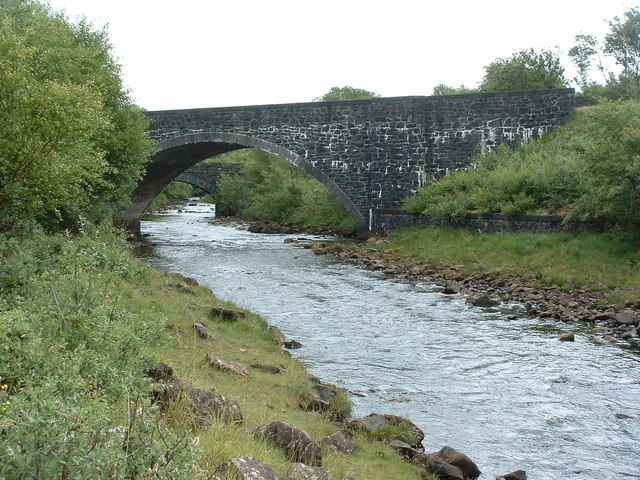
Beach River, Isle of Mull

There are numerous watercourses on Mull, some of which though short are termed 'rivers'.They are listed anticlockwise from Tobermory.

- Tobermory River
- River Bellart
- River Bà (Glencannel River flows into Loch Bà)
- Scarisdale River
- Coladoir River
- Leidle River
- Beach River
- Lussa River
- Scallastle River
- River Forsa
- Aros River
  - Ledmore River (Ls)
  - Allt an Lon Biolaireich (Rs)

Rùm

There are a number of watercourses on Rùm, some of which are named as 'rivers'. They are listed anticlockwise from Kinloch.

- Kinloch River
- Kilmory River
- Abhainn Rangail
- Dibidil River

Isle of Skye

Listed anticlockwise around the coast from Kyleakin. Many small watercourses, which would in other areas be named as 'burn' or 'allt', bear the name 'river' in Skye.

- Broadford River
- River Sligachan
- Allt Dearg Mòr
- Varragill River
- River Leasgeary
- River Chracaig
- Lealt River
- Stenscholl River (upper reaches known as Kilmartin River)
- River Brogaig
- Kilmaluag River
- River Rha
- River Conon
- River Hinnisdal
- River Romesdal
- River Haultin
- River Snizort
  - Lòn an Eireannaich (R)
  - Abhainn an Acha-leathain
    - Tungadal River
- River Tora
- Treaslane River
- Bay River
- River Horneval
- Osdale River
- Hamara River
- Lorgill River
- Dibidal River
- Roskhill River
- Caroy River
- River Ose
- Amar River
- Sumardale River
- River Drynoch
- Viskigill Burn
- River Talisker
- Eynort River
- River Brittle
- Scavaig River
- Abhainn Camas Fhionnairigh
- Ord River
- Kylerhea River

=== Outer Hebrides ===
Lewis

- Abhainn Ghriais
- Abhainn Lacasdail
- Abhainn Ghrioda (Greeta River or River Creed)
- Abhainn Arnoil
- Abhainn Bharabhais

=== Orkney ===
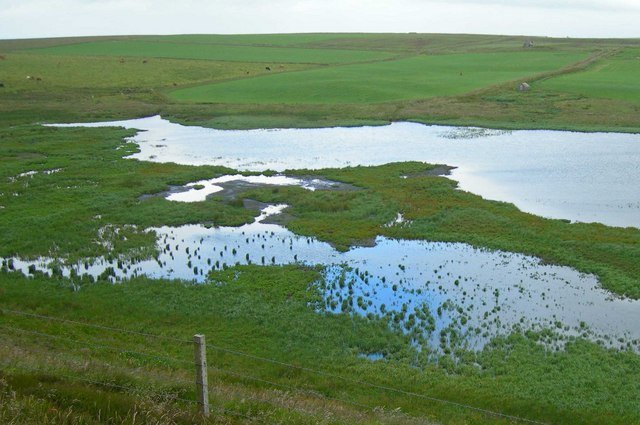
Mill Dam wetlands, Shapinsay

Mainland

- Burn of Ayreland
- Mill Dam Burn, Shapinsay, Orkney Islands

=== Shetland ===
Mainland

- Burn of Weisdale
- Burn of Sandwater/Burn of Pettawater

== Listing by length ==
Various measurements are provided for the lengths of Scottish rivers. The table below distinguishes between the river alone and the river plus tidal waters, which many sources use. In all cases the distance is for the longest distance through the catchment area not just the distance of that portion of it which the named river covers excluding upstream tributaries.

River	River Length	River + Estuary Length	Notes
River Tay	155 kilometres (96 mi)	185 kilometres (115 mi)	The Tay-Tummel-Gaur from its source, Coirean Lochan by Stob Ghabhar, to a line from Budden Ness to Tentsmuir Point.
River Spey	168.6 kilometres (104.8 mi)	168.6 kilometres (104.8 mi)	The Spey is the longest stretch of river in Scotland bearing the same name throughout, though that does include Loch Insh.
River Clyde	158 kilometres (98 mi)	168.4 kilometres (104.6 mi)	The river length is measured to Dumbarton Rock, the estuary to the Firth of Clyde at Ardmore Point.
River Tweed	162 kilometres (101 mi)	162 kilometres (101 mi)	The lower reaches of the Tweed are in England.
River Dee, Aberdeenshire	143 kilometres (89 mi)	143 kilometres (89 mi)	
River Forth	113 kilometres (70 mi)	136 kilometres (85 mi)	The river is measured to the Kincardine Bridge, the estuary to easternmost point of Inchgarvie by the Forth Bridge.
River Don	135 kilometres (84 mi)	135 kilometres (84 mi)	
River Ness	109 kilometres (68 mi)	109 kilometres (68 mi)	The Ness-Oich-Garry. No account is taken of the Inverness Firth.
River Findhorn	103 kilometres (64 mi)	103 kilometres (64 mi)	
River Nith	101 kilometres (63 mi)	101 kilometres (63 mi)	At low tide, the sea recedes to such an extent that the length of the river is extended by 13 kilometres (8.1 mi).
River Deveron	100 kilometres (62 mi)	100 kilometres (62 mi)	
River Beauly	82 kilometres (51 mi)	94 kilometres (58 mi)	The Beauly-Glass-Affric with the estuary measured to the Kessock Bridge.
River Dee, Galloway	88 kilometres (55 mi)	88 kilometres (55 mi)	The Dee-Ken-Water of Deuch. At low tide, the length is extended by 2.9 km.
River Conon	70 kilometres (43 mi)	88 kilometres (55 mi)	The estuary is measured to Invergordon Harbour/ Newhall Point.
River Lochy	87 kilometres (54 mi)	87 kilometres (54 mi)	The Lochy-Spean to Loch Linnhe at mouth of the River Nevis.
River South Esk, Angus	85 kilometres (53 mi)	85 kilometres (53 mi)	
River Annan	78 kilometres (48 mi)	78 kilometres (48 mi)	

== Listing by area of catchment ==
The major rivers of Scotland, in order of catchment, are:

1. River Tay c. 2,000 square miles (5,200 km^{2})
2. River Tweed 1,500 square miles (3,900 km^{2})
3. River Spey 1,097 square miles (2,840 km^{2})

Note: Imperial figures from quoted source; and metric figures less certain.

== Shared names ==
A number of Scottish rivers have identical or very similar names which can be a source of confusion. These are some of the main ones. The symbol '>' is used here to signify 'tributary of':

Ale

- Ale Water ( > Eye Water, Eyemouth); Ale Water ( > Tweed)

Allan

- Allan Water ( > Forth); Allan Water ( > Teviot > Tweed)

Almond

- River Almond (Lothian); River Almond ( > Tay)

Avon

- River Avon (Falkirk); River Avon ( > Spey); Avon Water ( > Clyde)

Ba

- River Bà (Mull); River Bà (Rannoch Moor)

Bannock Burn

- Bannock Burn ( > River Helmsdale); Bannock Burn ( > Forth)

Barr

- Barr River (Morvern); Barr River ( > River Laggan, Islay); Barr Water (Kintyre)

Black Burn

- Black Burn – commonly occurring including Lossie, Tweed, Water of Luce

Black Water

- Black Water – very frequent

Calder

- River Calder ( > Spey, Highand); North Calder Water ( > Clyde); South Calder Water ( > Clyde)

Carron

- River Carron (Forth); River Carron (Sutherland); River Carron (Wester Ross); Carron Water (Aberdeenshire); Carron Water ( > Nith)

Conon

- River Conon (Skye); River Conon ( > Cromarty Firth)

Dee

- River Dee, Aberdeenshire (Aberdeen); River Dee (Galloway)

Dibidal, Dibidil

- Dibidal River (Skye); Dibidil River (Rùm)

Dorback

- Dorback Burn ( > Nethy > Spey); Dorback Burn ( > Findhorn)

Douglas

- Douglas Water ( > Clyde); Douglas Water (Loch Lomond); Douglas Water (Loch Fyne)

Eden

- Eden Water (Tweed); River Eden (Fife)

Elrick

- Elrick Burn (Don); Elrick Burn (Findhorn)

Enrick, Endrick

- River Endrick (Loch Lomond); River Enrick (Loch Ness)

Esk, North Esk, South Esk

- River Esk, Dumfries and Galloway ('Border Esk'), River Esk, Lothian (Lothian); River North Esk; River North Esk (Lothian); River South Esk; River South Esk (Lothian)

Gala

- Gala Lane (Loch Doon); Gala Water ( > Tweed)

Garry

- River Garry (Loch Oich); River Garry ( > Tummel > Tay)

Glass

- River Glass (Easter Ross); River Glass, Strathglass ( > Beauly)

Glenmore

- Glenmore River; Glenmore River

Isla

- River Isla ( > Deveron); River Isla ( > Tay)

Kilmory

- Kilmory River (Rùm); Kilmory Water

Kinglas, Kinglass

- Kinglas Water; River Kinglass

Kinloch

- Kinloch River (Rùm); Kinloch River; Kinloch River

Ledmore

- Ledmore River (Kirkaig); Ledmore River (Mull)

Leven

- River Leven (West Highlands); River Leven ( > Clyde); River Leven (Fife)

Lochy, Lochay

- River Lochay (Tay); River Lochy (Great Glen); River Lochy (Glen Lochy)

Lunan

- Lunan Burn (Tay); Lunan Water

Lyne

- River Lyne (Border Esk); Lyne Water (Tweed)

Machrie

- Machrie River (Islay); Machrie Water (Arran)

Meggat, Megget

- Meggat Water ( > Border Esk); Megget Water ( > Tweed)

Mor (This is merely a Gaelic adjective meaning "large" or "great")

- Abhainn Mór (Arran); Abhainn Mor (Kirkaig)

Shiel

- River Shiel (Loch Shiel); River Shiel ( > Loch Duich)

Tarf, Tarff

- Tarf Water ( > Tilt > Garry > Tummel > Tay); Tarf Water ( > River Bladnoch (Galloway)); Tarff Water ( > River Dee, Galloway); River Tarff, Fort Augustus ( > Loch Ness); Water of Tarf ( > River North Esk, Angus/Aberdeenshire )

== See also ==
- Rivers and Fisheries Trusts of Scotland (RAFTS)
- The Rivers Trust
- List of waterway societies in the United Kingdom
- List of rivers of England
- List of rivers of Ireland
- List of rivers of the Isle of Man
- List of rivers of Wales
- Longest rivers of the United Kingdom
