= Holms Water =

River in Scotland

Coordinates: 55°36′N 3°24′W

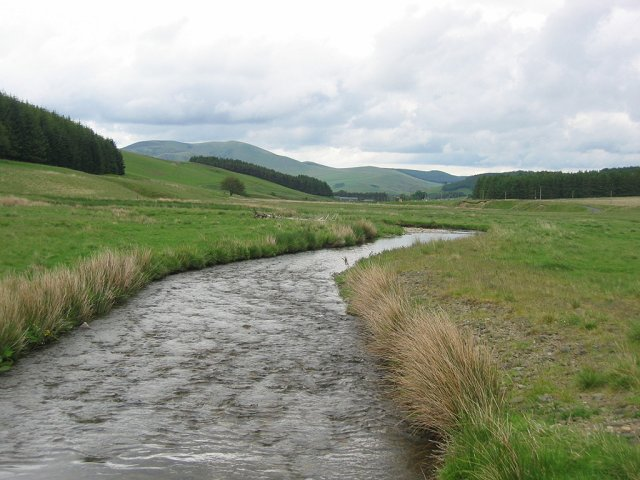
Holms Water

The Holms Water is a river and a tributary of the Biggar Water, which is a tributary of the River Tweed, in the parish of Broughton, Glenholm and Kilbucho in the Scottish Borders area of Scotland, near Glenkirk, Stanhope, Peeblesshire and Hearthstane.

== See also ==
- List of places in the Scottish Borders
- List of places in Scotland
- List of rivers of Scotland
