= Loch Bà (Rannoch Moor) =

Lake in Argyll and Bute, Scotland

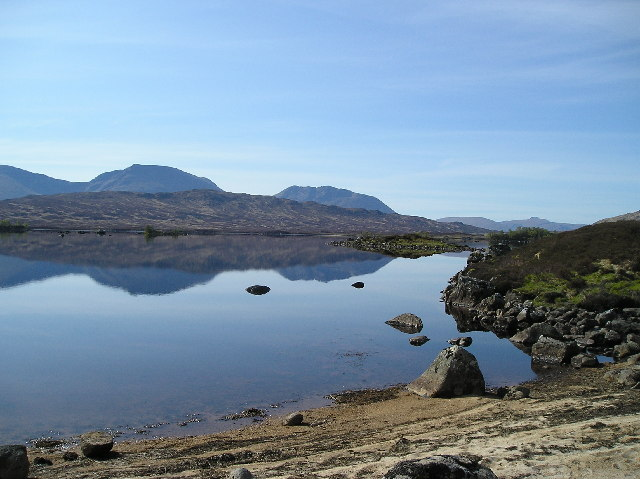
- Loch Bà, looking south towards Glas Bheinn.

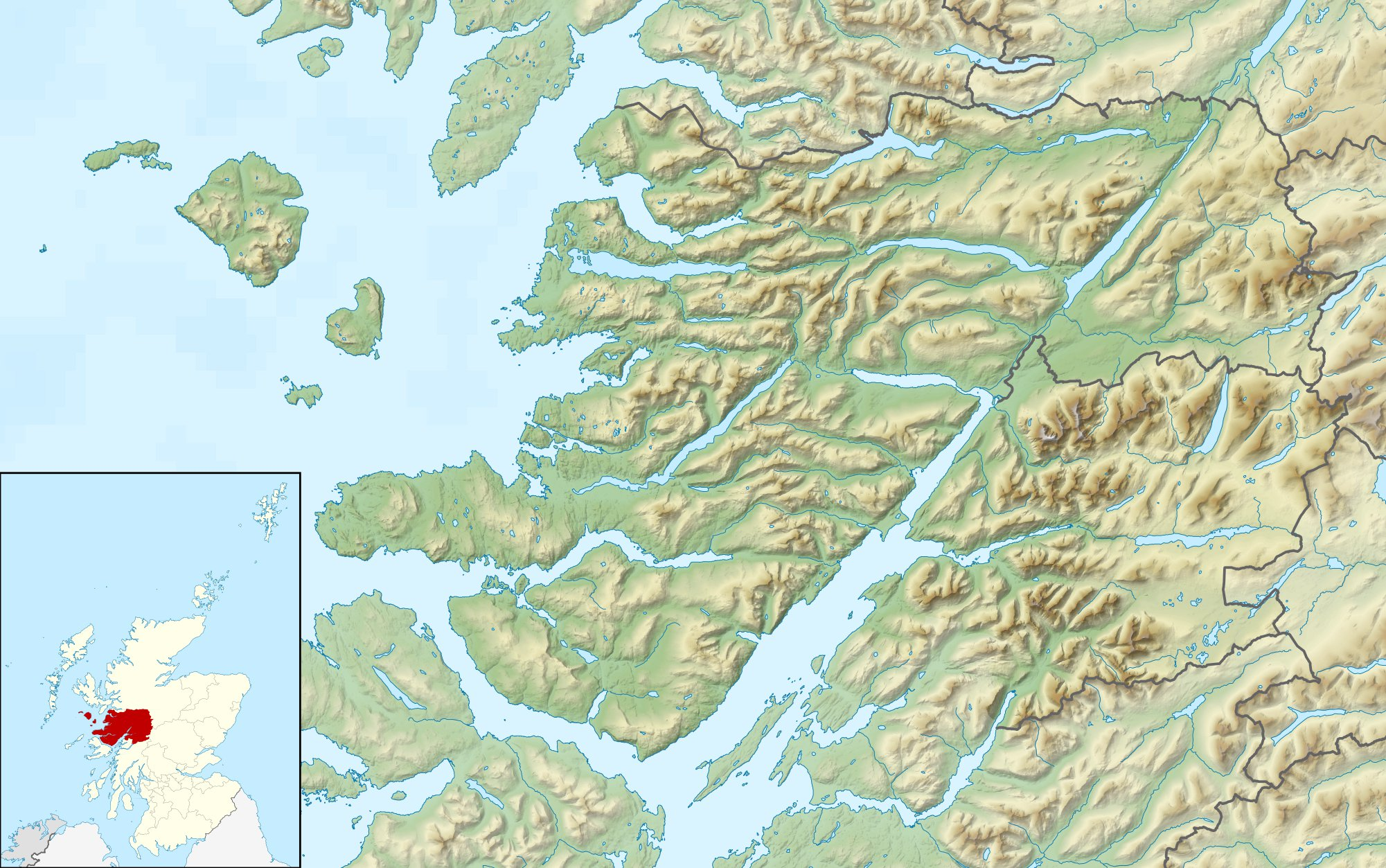
- Location within Lochaber
- Location: Rannoch Moor, Highland council area, Scotland; grid reference NN324503
- Coordinates: 56°37′0.066″N 4°44′4.376″W
- River sources: River Bà
- Primary outflows: Abhainn Bà
- Ocean/sea sources: Atlantic Ocean
- Basin countries: Scotland
- Max. length: 4.00 km (2.49 mi)
- Max. width: 1.95 km (1.21 mi)
- Surface area: 2.37 km^{2} (0.92 sq mi)
- Average depth: 7.8 ft (2.4 m)
- Max. depth: 29.8 ft (9.1 m)
- Water volume: 6.06 km^{3} (1.45 cu mi)
- Surface elevation: 294 m (965 ft)
- Settlements: Inverkirkaig

Loch Bà is a shallow irregular shaped freshwater loch on Rannoch Moor, Argyll and Bute, in the Scottish West Highlands, within the Highland council area of Scotland. It is about 25 km east-south-east of Glen Coe, and 20 km north of Tyndrum.

There is a viewpoint on the east side of the A82 road which runs past the western end of the main loch.

== Geography ==
Loch Bà is one of two (?) primary lochs that sit in Rannoch Moor, surrounded by the south western ranges of the Grampian Mountains. Its shape is very irregular. As visible in the Landranger map, available by the map search function of Historic Environment Scotland, it lies little below 300 metres above sea level south west of Loch Laidon, almost in the "axis" of that long lake. It is fed and drained by River Ba`, which discharges into Loch Laidon and from there by River Gaur (Garbh Chaoir) into Loch Rannoch, the head of River Tummel, a tributary of River Tay.

South and west of Loch Bà rises the Black Mount (Gaelic An Monadh Dubh). Its third highest top, named Meall a' Buirith, is situated little more than 5 km west of the western bays of the lake.
