= Loch Eigheach =

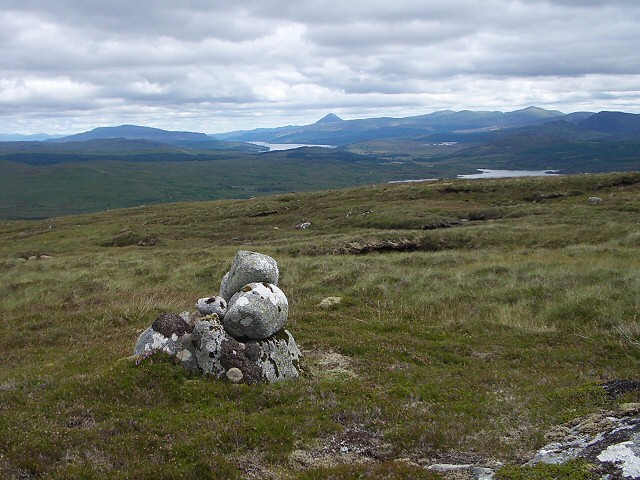
- Marker cairn on plateau. This small marker cairn is at the eastern edge of the Meall Liath na Doire plateau. The view eastwards takes in Loch Eigheach, Loch Rannoch and Schiehallion on the skyline.

- Location within Perth and Kinross
- Coordinates: 56.6797°N 4.5325°W
- Type: freshwater loch
- Primary inflows: Allt Eigheach
- River sources: River Gaur
- Primary outflows: River Gaur
- Max. length: 1.81 km (1.12 mi)
- Max. width: 1.02 km (0.63 mi)
- Surface area: 132.3 ha (327 acres)
- Average depth: 6 ft (1.8 m)
- Max. depth: 28 ft (8.5 m)
- Shore length^{1}: 7.9 km (4.9 mi)
- Surface elevation: 252 m (827 ft)
- Islands: 2
- ^{1} Shore length is not a well-defined measure.

Loch Eigheach is a large upland dammed freshwater loch in the Scottish Highlands. It is located in Rannoch Moor in the Council Area of Perth and Kinross. The undisturbed Loch Eigheach was much smaller.

== Dam ==
Loch Eigheach is part of the Tummel hydro-electric power scheme. The Gaur Dam was placed at its eastern end, enlarging the loch, in the 1950s.

== Geography ==
Loch Eigheach lies on the River Gaur and is located between Loch Laidon in the west and Loch Rannoch in the east.

On its northern shore, the river Allt Eigheach flows into the loch. The main inflow to the loch in the east is the Garbh Ghaoir. Loch Eigheach is traversed by the River Gaur that flows out of Loch Eigheach in the west. The water leaving Loch Eigheach across the River Gaur first flows through a hydroelectric power station before being returned to the riverbed.

The shores of Loch Eigheach are completely uninhabited. Parts of the north shore and the dam wall are accessed by the B846. All other shorelines are not accessible by car. Loch Eigheach is a fishing area where mainly perch are caught.

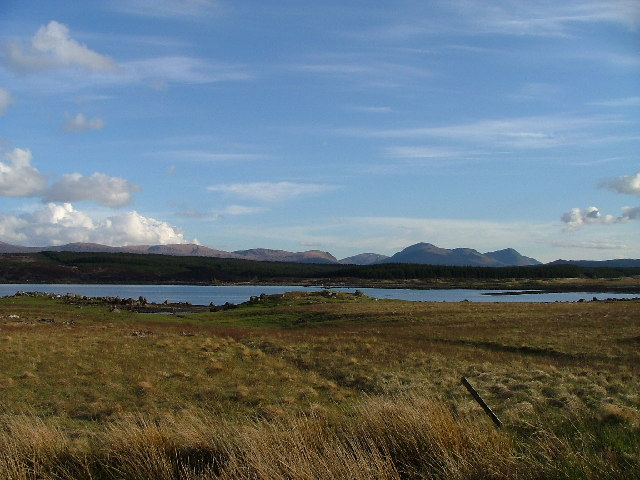
Loch Eigheach from the north
