= List of listed buildings in Skirling, Scottish Borders =

This is a list of listed buildings in the civil parish of Skirling in the Scottish Borders, Scotland.

== List ==
| Name | Location | Date Listed | Grid Ref. (Note: Sometimes known as OSGB36, the grid reference (where provided) is based on the British national grid reference system used by the Ordnance Survey. • "Guide to National Grid". Ordnance Survey. • "Get-a-map". Ordnance Survey.) | Geo-coordinates | Notes | LB Number (Note: Historic Environment Scotland assign a unique alphanumeric identifier to each designated site in Scotland, for listed buildings this always begins with "LB", for example "LB12345".) | Image |
|---|---|---|---|---|---|---|---|
| Former School And School House, Skirling | | | | 55°38′10″N 3°28′10″W | Category C(S) | 19720 | Upload Photo |
| Churchyard, Minister's Gate | | | | 55°38′08″N 3°28′15″W | Category B | 15155 | Upload Photo |
| Former U.F. Church ( Joiners Workshop) | | | | 55°38′14″N 3°28′11″W | Category C(S) | 15158 | Upload Photo |
| Kirkcroft, Skirling | | | | 55°38′17″N 3°28′08″W | Category C(S) | 15160 | Upload Photo |
| Cottages On East Side Of Skirling Green (Barr, Little, John, Watson, Speirs, Post Office) | | | | 55°38′10″N 3°28′04″W | Category C(S) | 15184 | Upload Photo |
| Skirling Parish Church | | | | 55°38′09″N 3°28′14″W | Category B | 15153 | Upload Photo |
| Firknowe Farm | | | | 55°38′08″N 3°28′05″W | Category C(S) | 15187 | Upload Photo |
| Joiner's Shop And Store, On East Side Of Skirling Green | | | | 55°38′09″N 3°28′05″W | Category C(S) | 15186 | Upload Photo |
| Skirling House | | | | 55°38′07″N 3°28′08″W | Category B | 15188 | Upload Photo |
| Sundials, In Garden Of Skirling House | | | | 55°38′06″N 3°28′08″W | Category B | 15189 | Upload Photo |
| Manse | | | | 55°38′05″N 3°28′20″W | Category B | 15156 | Upload Photo |
| War Memorial | | | | 55°38′19″N 3°28′08″W | Category B | 15159 | Upload Photo |
| Leven Cottage And Loanfoot With Steading Behind And Pipers Statue In Front | | | | 55°38′12″N 3°28′07″W | Category B | 15161 | Upload Photo |
| House On East Side Of Skirling Green (Ritchie) | | | | 55°38′09″N 3°28′05″W | Category C(S) | 15185 | Upload Photo |
| Churchyard Entrance Gate | | | | 55°38′09″N 3°28′12″W | Category B | 15154 | Upload Photo |
| Small Bridge At Former School, Over Skirling Burn | | | | 55°38′10″N 3°28′09″W | Category C(S) | 15157 | Upload Photo |
| Howes Brae Farmhouse | | | | 55°38′27″N 3°27′52″W | Category C(S) | 13864 | Upload Photo |
| Galalaw Farmhouse | | | | 55°38′34″N 3°27′47″W | Category C(S) | 13865 | Upload Photo |

== Key ==
The scheme for classifying buildings in Scotland is:

- Category A: "buildings of national or international importance, either architectural or historic; or fine, little-altered examples of some particular period, style or building type."
- Category B: "buildings of regional or more than local importance; or major examples of some particular period, style or building type, which may have been altered."
- Category C: "buildings of local importance; lesser examples of any period, style, or building type, as originally constructed or moderately altered; and simple traditional buildings which group well with other listed buildings."

In March 2016 there were 47,288 listed buildings in Scotland. Of these, 8% were Category A, and 50% were Category B, with the remaining 42% being Category C.
