= River Druie =

Right bank tributary of the River Spey in northeast Scotland

Coordinates: 57.18158°N 3.82532°W

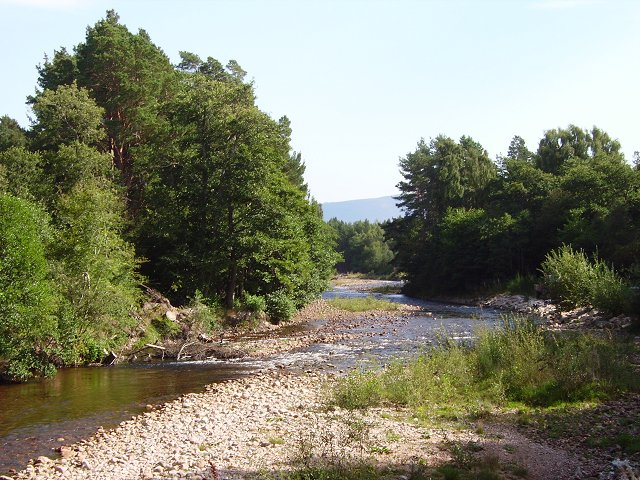
River Druie near Inverdruie

The River Druie (Scottish Gaelic: Drùidh) is a right bank tributary of the River Spey in northeast Scotland. The Druie tributaries are Am Beanaidh, which emerges from Loch Einich and flows north through Gleann Einich; and the River Luineag, which emerges from Loch Morlich within the Glenmore Forest Park and receives all the drainage from the northern slopes of Cairn Gorm. These meet immediately above the bridge carrying the B970 road over the river at Coylumbridge. From this point the Druie flows 1.5 miles (2.5 km) past Inverdruie to meet the Spey at the southern end of Aviemore.
