= Broughton, Glenholm and Kilbucho =

Coordinates: 55.606846°N 3.4082247°W

- Location within the Scottish Borders
- Population: 648
- OS grid reference: NT113357
- Council area: Scottish Borders
- Lieutenancy area: Tweeddale
- Country: Scotland
- Sovereign state: United Kingdom
- Post town: Biggar
- Postcode district: ML12
- Dialling code: 01899
- Police: Scotland
- Fire: Scottish
- Ambulance: Scottish
- UK Parliament: Dumfriesshire, Clydesdale and Tweeddale
- Scottish Parliament: Midlothian South, Tweeddale and Lauderdale

Broughton, Glenholm and Kilbucho is a parish in Peeblesshire in the Scottish Borders, 11 miles south-west of Peebles, lying in the upper part of the valley of the River Tweed in the Southern Uplands. It is a union of three former parishes of bearing these names and the united parish is bound by Kirkurd on the north, Stobo on the east, Drumelzier on the south-east, Culter and Biggar, South Lanarkshire on the west and by Skirling in the north-west. For 4½ miles the eastern border of the parish follows the northward flowing Tweed. It is 9½ miles long north-to-south and 3½ miles wide. The only village is Broughton.

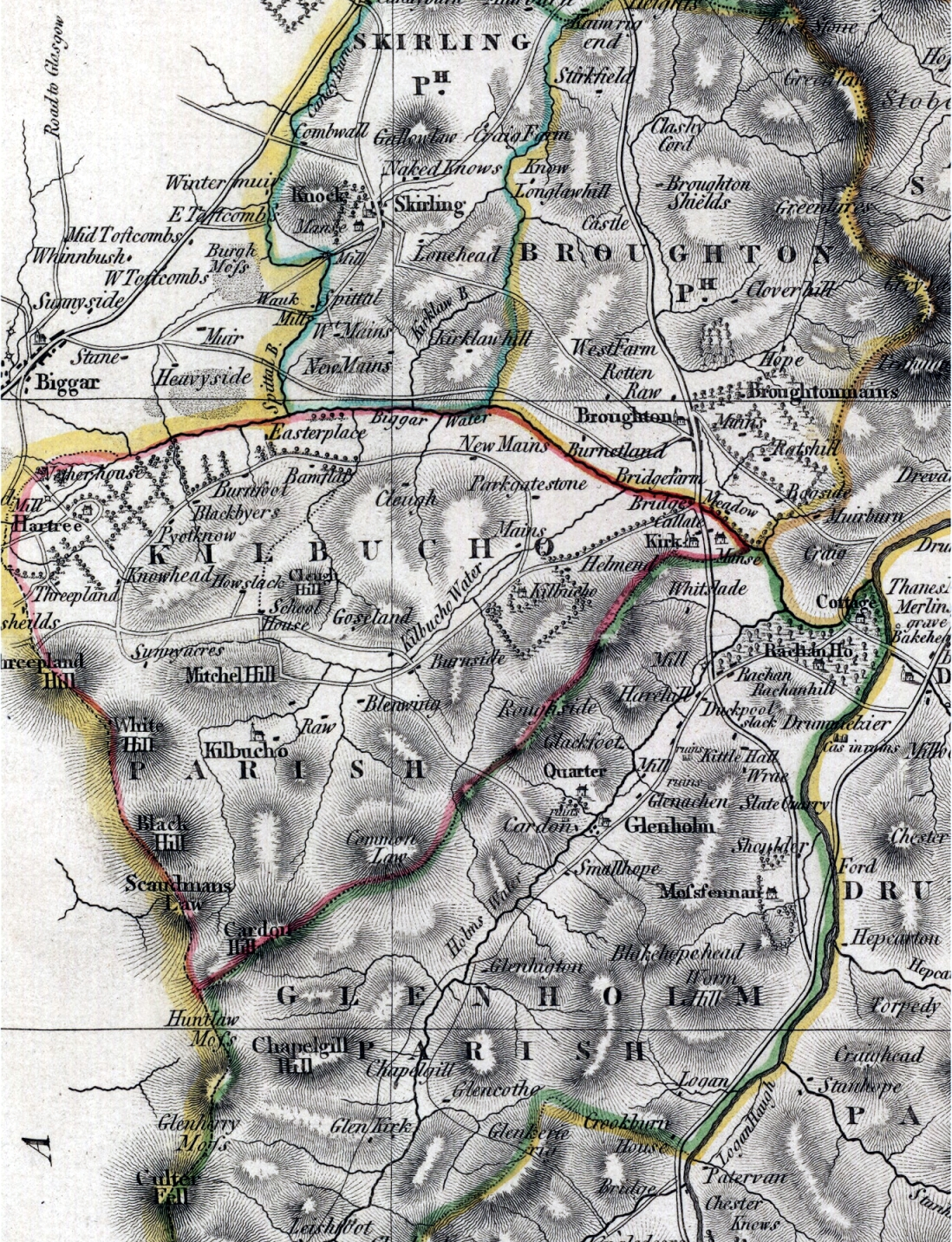
Broughton, Glenholm and Kilbucho (1821) showing separate parishes Kirk of united parish shown at Callate (Calzeate) in far east of Kilbucho

This parish comprehends the old parish of Broughton in the north, and Glenholm in the south-east and Kilbucho on the south-west. In accordance with the deed of annexation, all three names are retained in the name of the united parish. Biggar Water, which forms the boundary between the Broughton and the other two, flows in an easterly direction and, before joining the Tweed, is joined in turn by Kilbucho Burn, Broughton Burn and Holms Water, each of which forms valleys containing the parishes that bear their names.

The origin of the name Glenholm is obviously the valley of the Holms. Kilbucho, also spelled Kilbeuhhoe, Kilbochoe, Kilbocho, and Kirkbucho, is probably the Gaelic prefix "Kil" meaning chapel together with the name of the Venerable Bede or St Bega or St Bees. "Brough" in Broughton may refer to "burgh" or more likely the Scots term Brough or Bruch, meaning circle, of hills.

The united parish was established by the Presbytery of Biggar in 1794 and a new church was built in 1804 at a convenient central location for the united parish. While within Kilbucho, the church is located just south of the village of Broughton and across Biggar Water. It is now a member of the linked "Parishes of Upper Tweeddale". Which is made up of the four linked Parishes of:

- Broughton, Glenholm and Kilbucho
- Skirling
- Stobo and Drumelzier
- Tweedsmuir

At the time the three old parishes were united their area and population was :

Parish	Area (acres)	Pop. 1801
Broughton	4660	274
Glenholm	9060	270
Kilbucho	6710	250
TOTAL	20,430	794

At the same time the north-west portion of Kilbucho, around Hartree and Hartree Hills, was transferred to the parish of Culter in Lanarkshire, although this portion remained in Peeblesshire. This had an area of 1712 acres. However this portion was returned to the united parish in 1891, so that Culter became a parish entirely within Lanarkshire.

For some time the three parishes continued to exist for some civil purposes. They continued as Registration Districts until 1870 and to have separate parish schools.

The civil parish of Broughton, Glenholm and Kilbucho is covered by the Upper Tweed Community Council (which also includes part of Drumelzier).

The civil parish has a population of 648 (in 2011) and its area is 19,797 acres.
