= Kirkurd =

Coordinates: 55.684214°N 3.3889174°W

- Location within the Scottish Borders
- Population: 218
- OS grid reference: NT127442
- Council area: Scottish Borders
- Lieutenancy area: Tweeddale
- Country: Scotland
- Sovereign state: United Kingdom
- Post town: West Linton
- Postcode district: EH46
- Dialling code: 01721
- Police: Scotland
- Fire: Scottish
- Ambulance: Scottish
- UK Parliament: Dumfriesshire, Clydesdale and Tweeddale
- Scottish Parliament: Midlothian South, Tweeddale and Lauderdale

Kirkurd is a parish in Peeblesshire in the Scottish Borders situated 3 miles south-east of Dolphinton and 6 miles north-east of Broughton. Tarth Water, a tributary of Lyne Water (itself a tributary of the River Tweed) forms the northern boundary, with the parishes of Linton and Newlands on the north bank. The parish of Stobo lies to the east and south, the parish of Broughton, Glenholm and Kilbucho to the south, Skirling and Dolphinton (Lanarkshire) to the east.

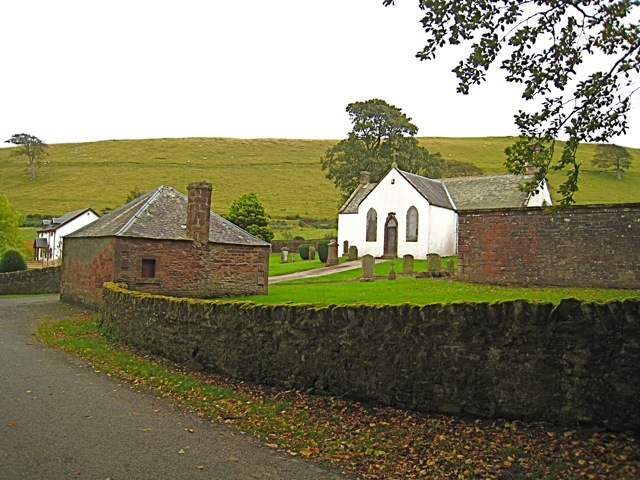
Kirkurd Parish Church

The parish lies in the Southern Uplands. It is lowest, at 680 ft, where Tarth Water leaves the parish in the east and the land rises to the south reaching 1,872 ft at the Broughton Heights at the southern boundary. Much of the land is around 700 ft above sea level.

The name signifies the Kirk of a place called Urd or Orde, but the origin of this place name is uncertain. The name "Urd" also appears in the place names Netherurd, Lochurd and Ladyurd within the parish and may mean quarter. Netherurd lies in the west of the parish, Lochurd south of Netherurd, Kirkurd near the centre and Ladyurd in the east. Netherurd is a handsome three storey Georgian villa of 1791 by William Lawson of Cairnmuir. In the mid 20th century it was changed into a training centre for the Girl Guides Association.

The parish also contains the settlements of Kirkdean and West Mains, near the present site of Kirkurd church.

== Kirkurd Church ==
It is recorded that a church in "Kercayrd" belonged to the bishopric of Glasgow in 1116. It was later given to the hospital at Soutra and in 1462 transferred to Trinity church in Edinburgh. The original church was located in the grounds of the Castle Craig estate, but when the present church building was built in 1766, it was located further west. The church was built by John Carmichael, 3rd Earl of Hyndford who died in the year of its completion. The church bell is inscribed to his memory.

Kirkurd Church was closed for public worship in 1985 when the ecclesiastical parish was joined to Newlands and used its church.

The principal mansions in the parish are Castle Craig (formerly Kirkurd house) and Netherurd. Castle Craig became a hospital during and after the Second World War, which it still is. The mansion of Netherurd was let to the Girl Guides in the 1950s and is now an outdoor activities centre.

The civil parish of Kirkurd is in the Lamancha, Newlands and Kirkurd Community Council area.

The civil parish has a population of 218 (in 2011) and its area is 5,704 acres.
