= River Lochy (Glen Lochy) =

- Location in Argyll and Bute

Location
- Country: Scotland

Physical characteristics
- Source: Loch Bhe
  - coordinates: 56°26′43″N 4°45′10″W
  - elevation: 258 m (846 ft)
- Mouth: River Orchy
  - coordinates: 56°24′27″N 4°55′58″W
  - elevation: 46 m (151 ft)

The River Lochy flows west through Glen Lochy from Loch Bhe to the River Orchy and hence Lochawe in the West Highlands of Scotland.

The A85 road parallels the river for much of its length, as does the West Highland Line from Crianlarich to Dalmally.

== See also ==
- List of rivers of Scotland
