= Skirling =

Coordinates: 55.635882°N 3.4704351°W

- Location within the Scottish Borders
- Population: 194
- OS grid reference: NT0753139017
- Council area: Scottish Borders
- Lieutenancy area: Tweeddale
- Country: Scotland
- Sovereign state: United Kingdom
- Post town: Biggar
- Postcode district: ML12
- Dialling code: 01721
- Police: Scotland
- Fire: Scottish
- Ambulance: Scottish
- UK Parliament: Dumfriesshire, Clydesdale and Tweeddale
- Scottish Parliament: Midlothian South, Tweeddale and Lauderdale

Skirling is a parish, community council area and village in Peeblesshire in the Scottish Borders situated 2 1/2 miles east of Biggar in Lanarkshire. Biggar Water, a tributary the River Tweed forms the southern boundary of the parish with the parish of Broughton, Glenholm and Kilbucho. It is also bounded by that parish on the east, namely the Broughton part of it. On the north it is bounded by the parish Kirkurd in Peeblesshire. Spittal Burn forms most of its western boundary with Lanarkshire.

Parish of Skirling, 1900

The parish lies in the Southern Uplands. Its village is 690 ft above sea level. Its length, north to south, is 3 miles and it is 2 miles at most wide. The highest point in the parish is Broomy Law, 1399 ft, on the north-west boundary. At its northernmost point the parish is met by 5 other parishes (boundary stone at site).

The earliest known record of Skirling by name dates from the reign of King Robert Bruce, who granted the barony of Scrawline to John Monfode. The barony of Skirling was possessed by the Cockburn family c.1370 - 1621 and during the 18th and 19th centuries by the Carmichael family. Thomas Gibson-Carmichael was raised to peerage of the United Kingdom in 1912 as Baron Carmichael of Skirling, but this title became extinct on his death in 1926. He commissioned the building of Skirling House in 1905.

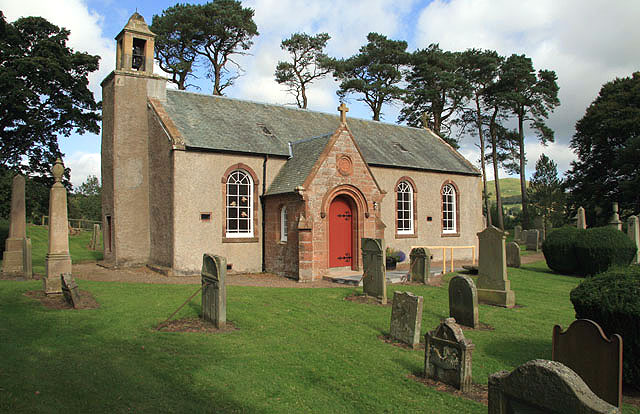
Skirling Kirk

The earliest record of a church is in 1275, sited near the present war memorial. The church was dedicated to St Mary the Virgin. Former ministers include John Greig. In 1843, William Hanna left the established Church of Scotland in 1843, joining the Free Church of Scotland, taking most of his congregation with him. The present building was rebuilt in 1720 and was much altered in 1891. It has a bell tower with a sundial, the bell dating from 1748. Ironwork on the graveyard gates is by Thomas Hadden and the Carmichael family plot is flanked by two angel sculptures. The church is now a member of the linked "Parishes of Upper Tweeddale", which is made up of four neighbouring Parishes.

The Skirling Community Council area is the same as the civil parish. The council has 6 members.

The village of Skirling has a central position in the parish. It originally consisted of five small farms on the valley floor of Skirling Burn, forming a roughly linear shaped settlement. The village is a conservation area, which includes the parish church, the old Free church, Skirling House, along with many 1 - 2 story buildings made from traditional materials. Just south-west of the village is the site of Skirling Castle, described as "ane notable beilding". It was demolished and burnt by Regent Moray on 12 June 1568, because of James Cockburn of Skirling's support for Mary, Queen of Scots.

The village war memorial was designed by Sir Robert Lorimer and added in 1920.

The civil parish has a population of 194 (in 2011) and its area is 3,423 acres.

At 11.18am on 31 December 2020 Skirling was the epicentre of a 1.9 Magnitude earthquake which was also felt in Biggar, Symington, West Linton and Peebles. Locals reported that they heard a "loud bang" or "loud rumbling noise" and that the "room shuddered".
