= River Nethy =

Right bank tributary of the River Spey in northeast Scotland

Coordinates: 57°17′N 3°40′W

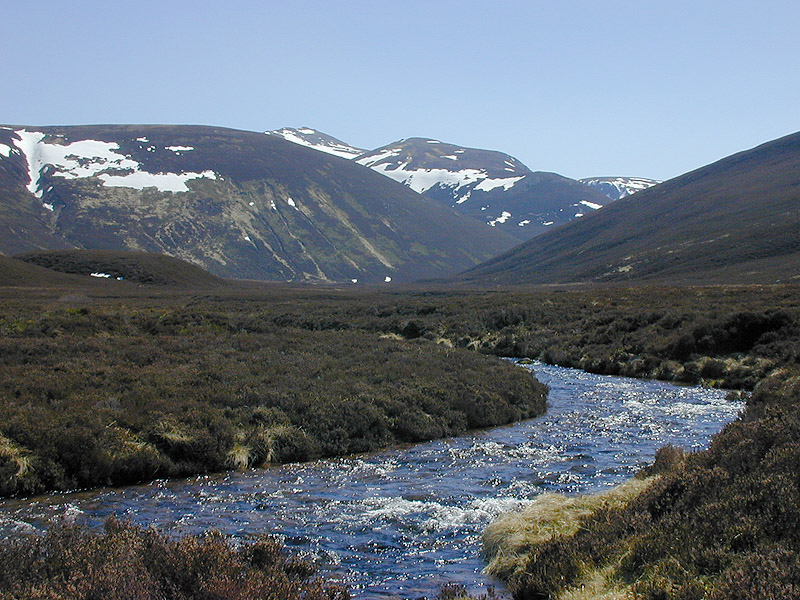
River Nethy near Bynack Stable

The River Nethy (Scottish Gaelic: Neithich / Abhainn Neithich) is a right bank tributary of the River Spey in northeast Scotland. It rises as the Garbh Allt between Cairn Gorm and A' Chòinneach on the northern slopes of the Cairngorms and flows northwards through Strath Nethy and into Abernethy Forest. Passing through Nethy Bridge where the B970 road crosses the river and gives its name to the village, the Nethy turns northwestward before entering the Spey at Broomhill. Numerous burns feed the Nethy, the most significant of which is the Dorback Burn which enters from its right bank a mile above Nethy Bridge.

== Etymology ==
The name 'Nethy' may be either Gaelic or pre-Gaelic in origin. It is considered to be cognate with the river names Nidd (in North Yorkshire), Nith (in Dumfries and Galloway) and Neath (in South Wales) and arises from a supposed nido meaning 'gleaming'.
