= Breakachy Burn =

Mountain stream in Scotland

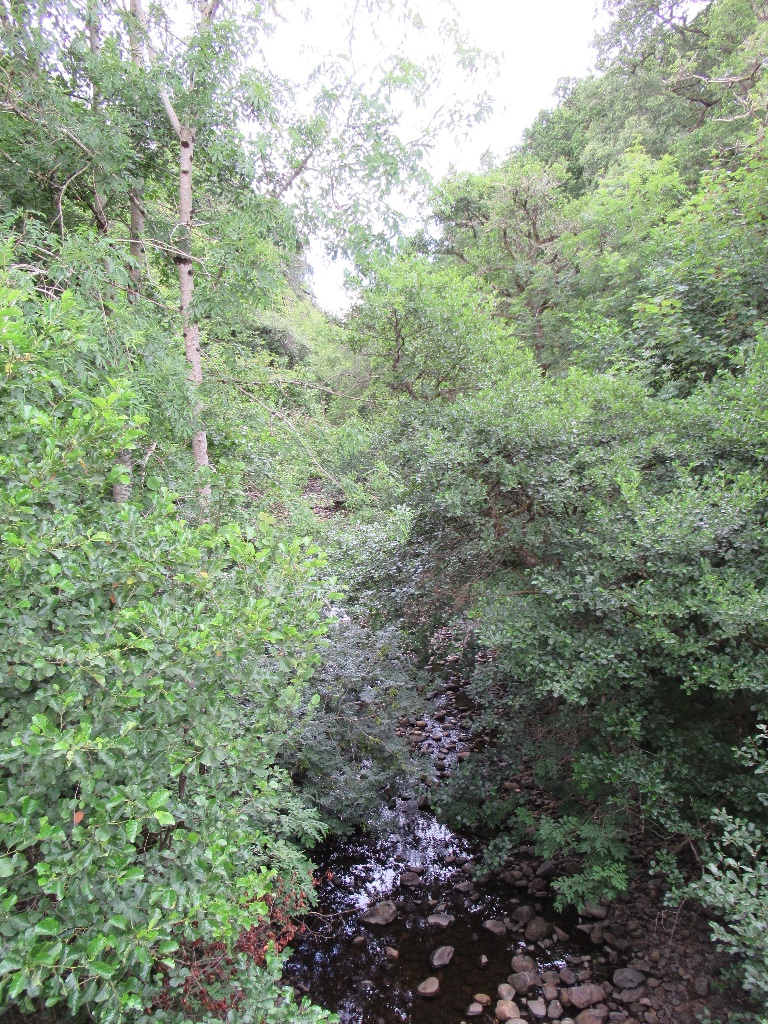

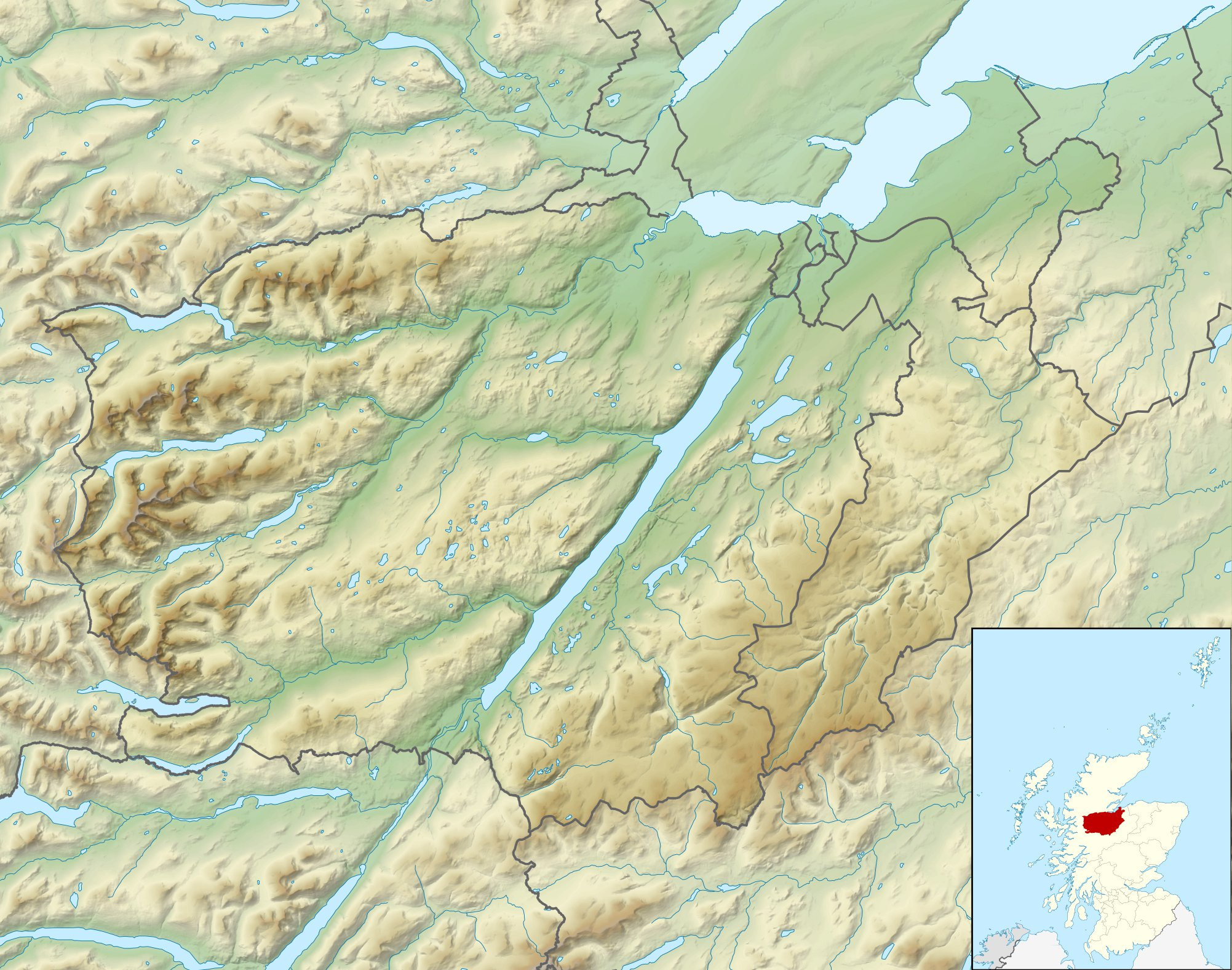
- Native name: Allt Bhreacacaidh (Scottish Gaelic)

Location
- Country: United Kingdom
- Constituent country: Scotland

Physical characteristics
- Source: Loch Ballach
  - coordinates: 57°29′17.4″N 4°35′40″W
  - elevation: 371 m (1,217 ft)
- 2nd source: Lake nan Dubh-Lochan
  - coordinates: 57°29′10.4″N 4°33′49.7″W
  - elevation: 325 m (1,066 ft)
- Mouth: River Beauly
  - coordinates: 57°27′40.5″N 4°32′25″W
  - elevation: 32 m (105 ft)

Breakachy Burn (Scottish Gaelic: Allt Bhreacacaidh, meaning "Stream of the Speckled Field") is a mountain stream in the Highland council area of Scotland. Despite its narrow width, the burn covers a large drainage basin with many smaller tributaries running off the hillside into it. The Breakachy Burn passes no human settlements on its course, before flowing into the River Beauly near Teanassie Primary School.

According to a 1763 document known as the Warrand of Buchter, Breakachy (listed as "Brackachy") and its surrounding lands were a davoch town in the Earldom of Ross. The area was likely used for sheep-grazing, as with most upland in the surrounding Strathglass.

Breakachy Burn features in several of the novels of Scottish author Iain R. Thomson, including The Long Horizon (1999) and The Endless Tide (2005).

== Dun Mor Hillfort ==
One point of interest surrounding the burn is the presence of an Iron Age hillfort, likely Pictish, known as Dun Mor (Scottish Gaelic: Dùn Mòr, meaning "Big Hillfort"). This is located on the burn's south side, on the lip of a crag several miles from the main road. The hillfort is best accessed from the northeast, as multiple tracks traverse the rough surrounding terrain from Farley Wood.

Dun Mor is large for hillforts of its kind, measuring 24m x 16m (78 ft x 56 ft) with a stone wall around 5 m (16 ft) thick. Despite its interest however, the hillfort has never undergone any extensive excavation, and is largely forgotten due to its remote location.

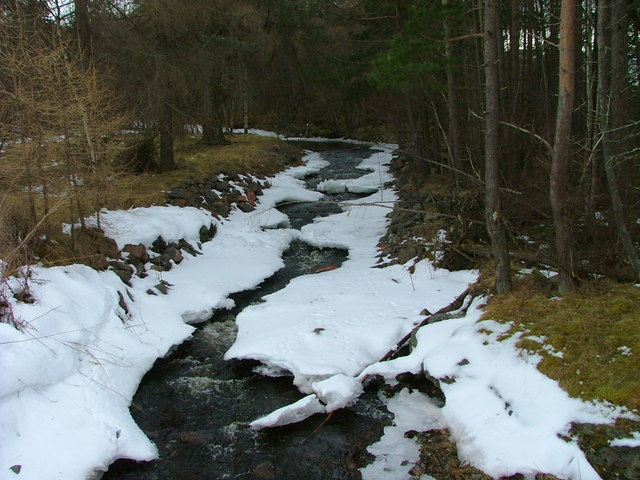
Breakachy Burn with surrounding trees, after a blizzard on the hills

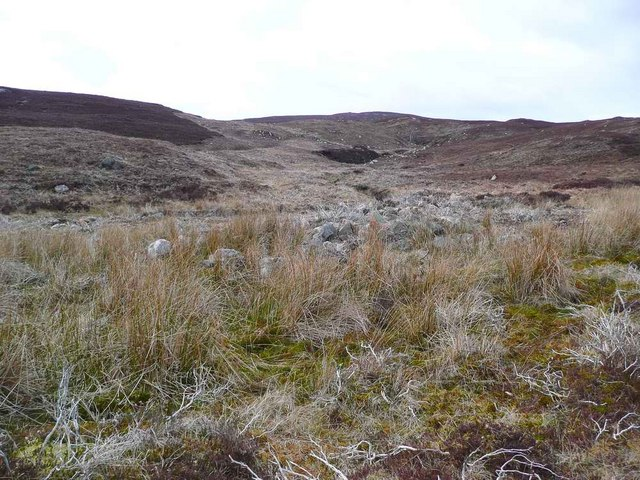
The desolate heathland surrounding Breakachy Burn
