= Barr Water =

River of the Kintyre peninsula in the Scottish Highlands

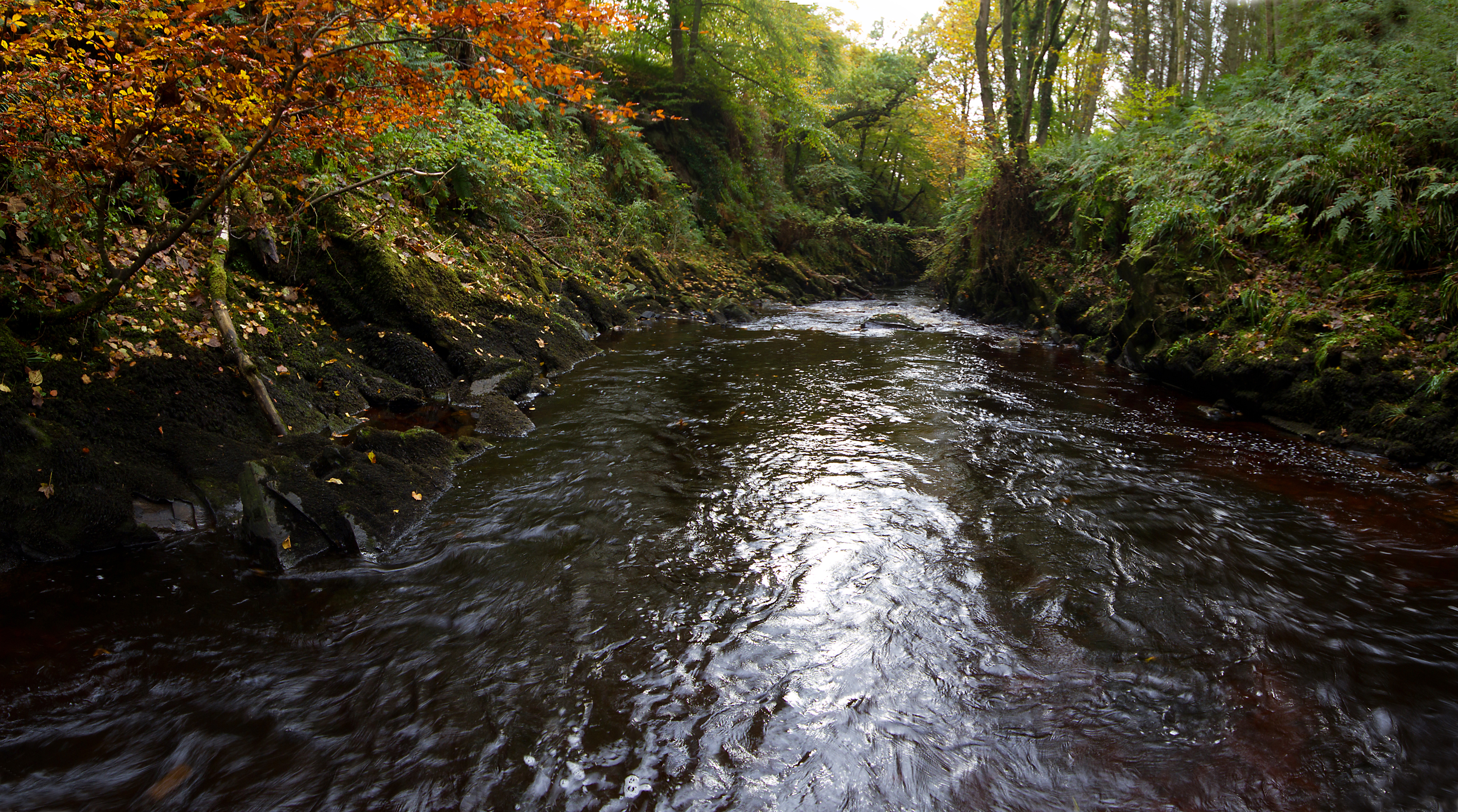
- Barr Water

Location
- Country: Scotland
- Region: Argyll and Bute
- Peninsula: Kintyre

Physical characteristics
- Source
  - coordinates: 55°36′10″N 5°35′21″W
- Mouth
  - location: Glenbarr
  - coordinates: 55°33′33″N 05°42′38″W

Barr Water is a westerly flowing river on the Kintyre peninsula in Argyll and Bute, west of Scotland. Rising at the diminutive Loch Losgainn near the hill of Cruach Mhic-an t-Saoir, it initially flows south-southwestwards amongst conifer plantations before turning west-southwestwards to flow down Barr Glen to reach the sea at Glenbarr.
