= Barr River, Morvern =

Short watercourse in Morvern in the Scottish Highlands

Coordinates: 56.641°N 5.884°W

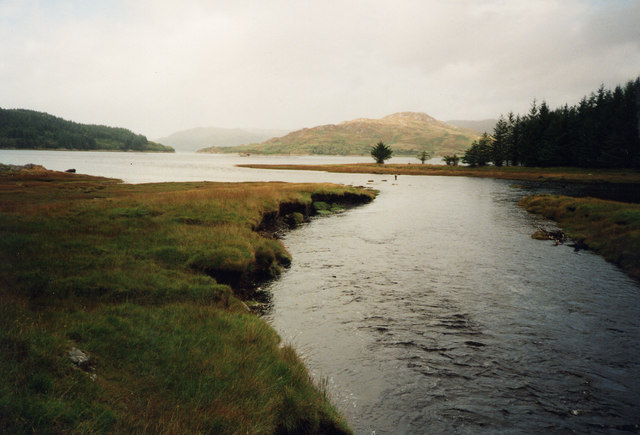
Barr River as it joins Loch Teacuis

Barr River is a short watercourse in Morvern in the Scottish Highlands. Its principal tributaries are the Allt Ghleann Sleibhtecoire and the Allt na Lice Beithe which rise on open moorland to the south and flow north amongst coniferous plantations. The river enters the tidal Loch Teacuis at Poll Achadh Luachrach.
