= Beltie Burn =

River in Scotland

Coordinates: 57°05′N 2°34′W

Beltie Burn Burn of Canny
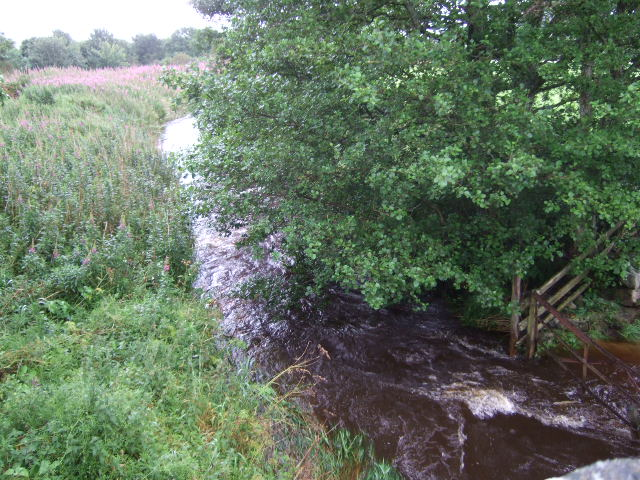
- The Beltie Burn as it flows out of Torphins

Physical characteristics
- Length: 25 km (16 mi)

Basin features
- River system: River Dee

The Beltie Burn is a burn in Aberdeenshire, Scotland, which below Torphins and Glassel is known as the Burn of Canny. It begins in the hill of Benaquhallie, and flows for 25 km (15.5 miles) south-east through Torphins before joining the River Dee about 4 kilometres (2.5 miles) west of Banchory. (Note: This may also be referred to as the canny Burn or Burn of Cannie.)

The burn's course was altered in the area south of Torphins to clear space for farming and railways, which affected the local wildlife and caused the stream to flood often. However, in September 2020 a project was launched to help restore the area's biodiversity by rerouting the burn to a more natural course, and creating wetland and habitats for many animals such as Atlantic salmon. The project was successful, and many species have been reinstated. Some parts of the burn used to serve as a habitat for otters, although it is uncertain as to whether or not they still remain.
