= River Laggan =

River on Islay, Argyll and Bute, Scotland

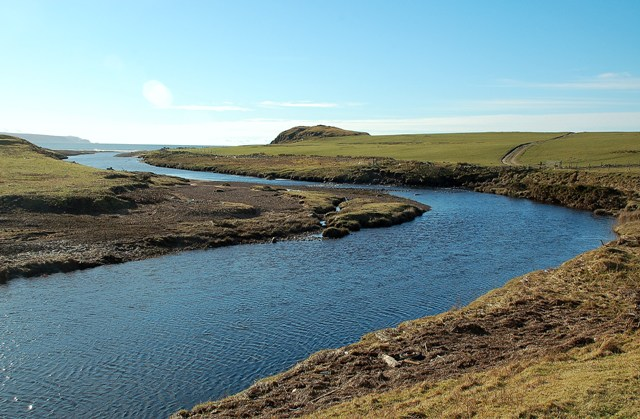
- The Laggan looking downstream to Loch Indaal. The hill in the centre, Cnoc Ebric, is the site of an Iron Age hillfort.

Physical characteristics
- Source
  - coordinates: 55°45′53″N 06°10′13″W
- Mouth
  - location: Loch Indaal
  - coordinates: 55°42′49″N 06°18′43″W

The River Laggan is a small river on the Scottish island of Islay. Having gathered the waters of the Kilennan River, Barr River and Duich River / Torra River it enters the sea at the north end of Laggan Bay off Loch Indaal.
