= Inverdruie =

Coordinates: 57.175°N 3.816°W

Inverdruie: Scottish Gaelic: Inbhir Dhrùidh
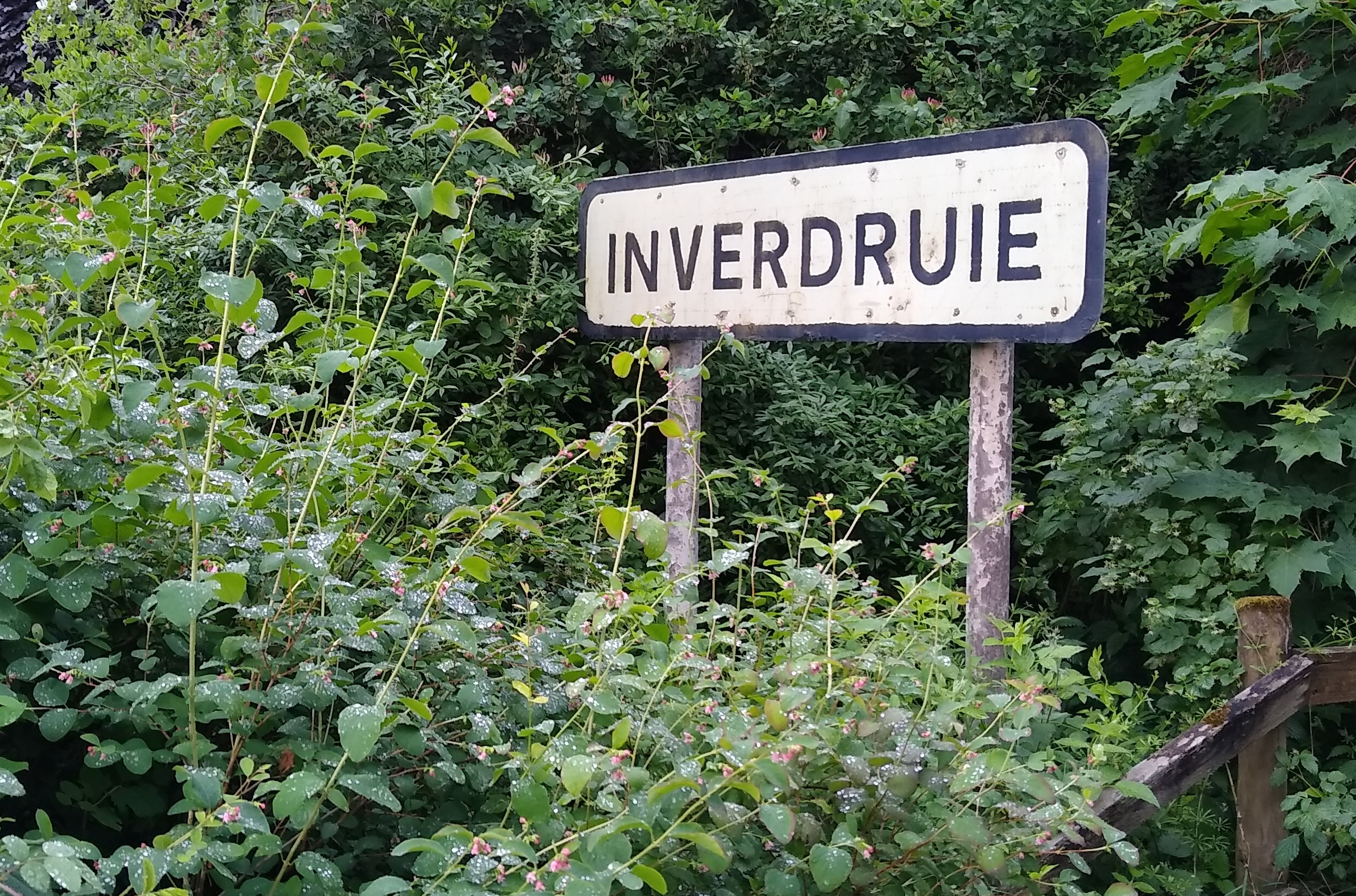

- Location within the Badenoch and Strathspey area
- OS grid reference: NH902108
- Council area: Highland
- Country: Scotland
- Sovereign state: United Kingdom
- Post town: Aviemore
- Postcode district: PH22 1
- Police: Scotland
- Fire: Scottish
- Ambulance: Scottish

Inverdruie (Scottish Gaelic: Inbhir Dhrùidh) is a small rural hamlet, that lies 2 miles southeast of Aviemore, in the strath of the River Spey, in the west Cairngorms National Park, in Badenoch and Strathspey, Inverness-shire, Scottish Highlands and is in the Scottish council area of Highland.

The single track B970 B road which connects Kingussie to Aviemore passes Inverdruie.

== Gallery ==
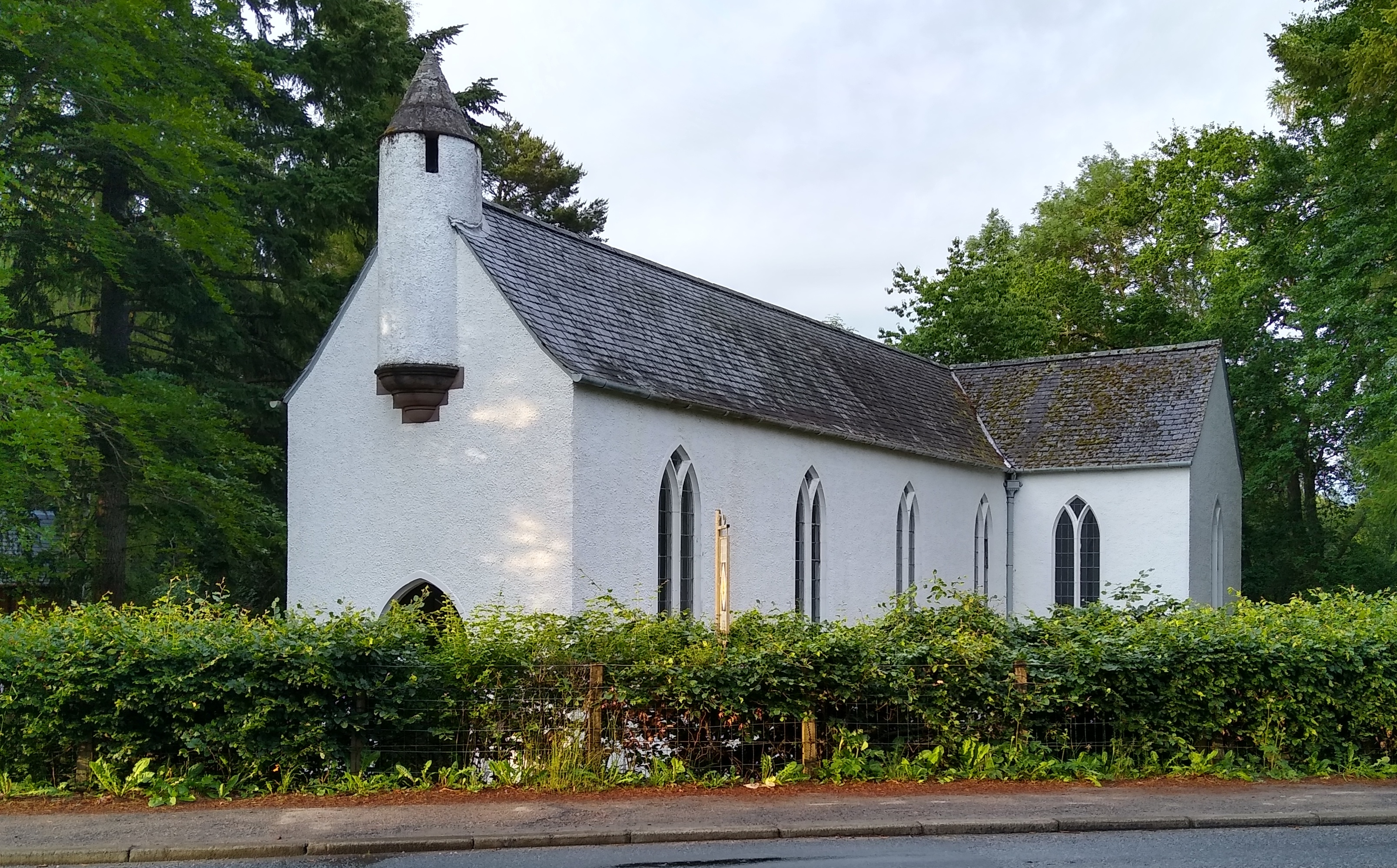

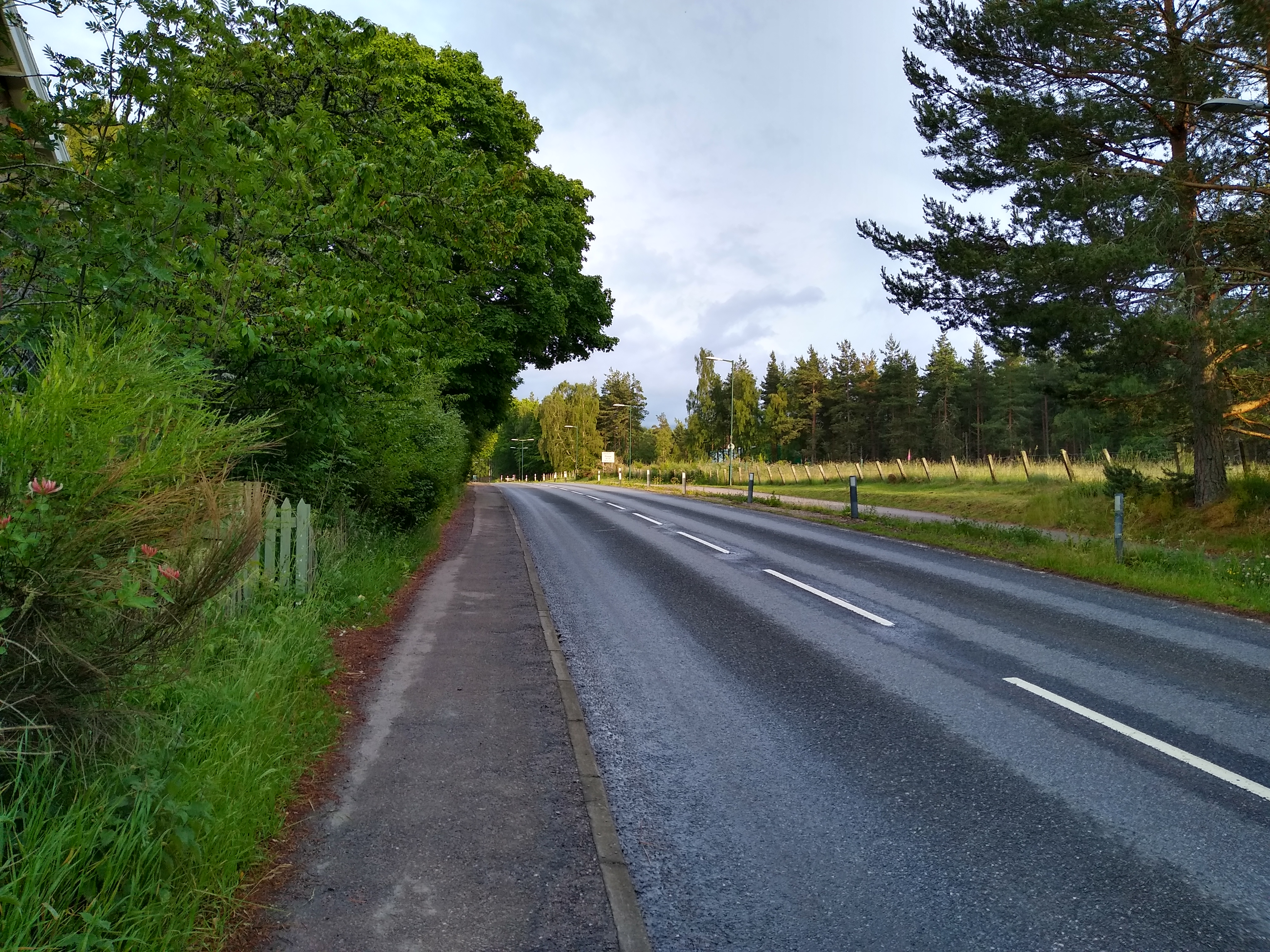

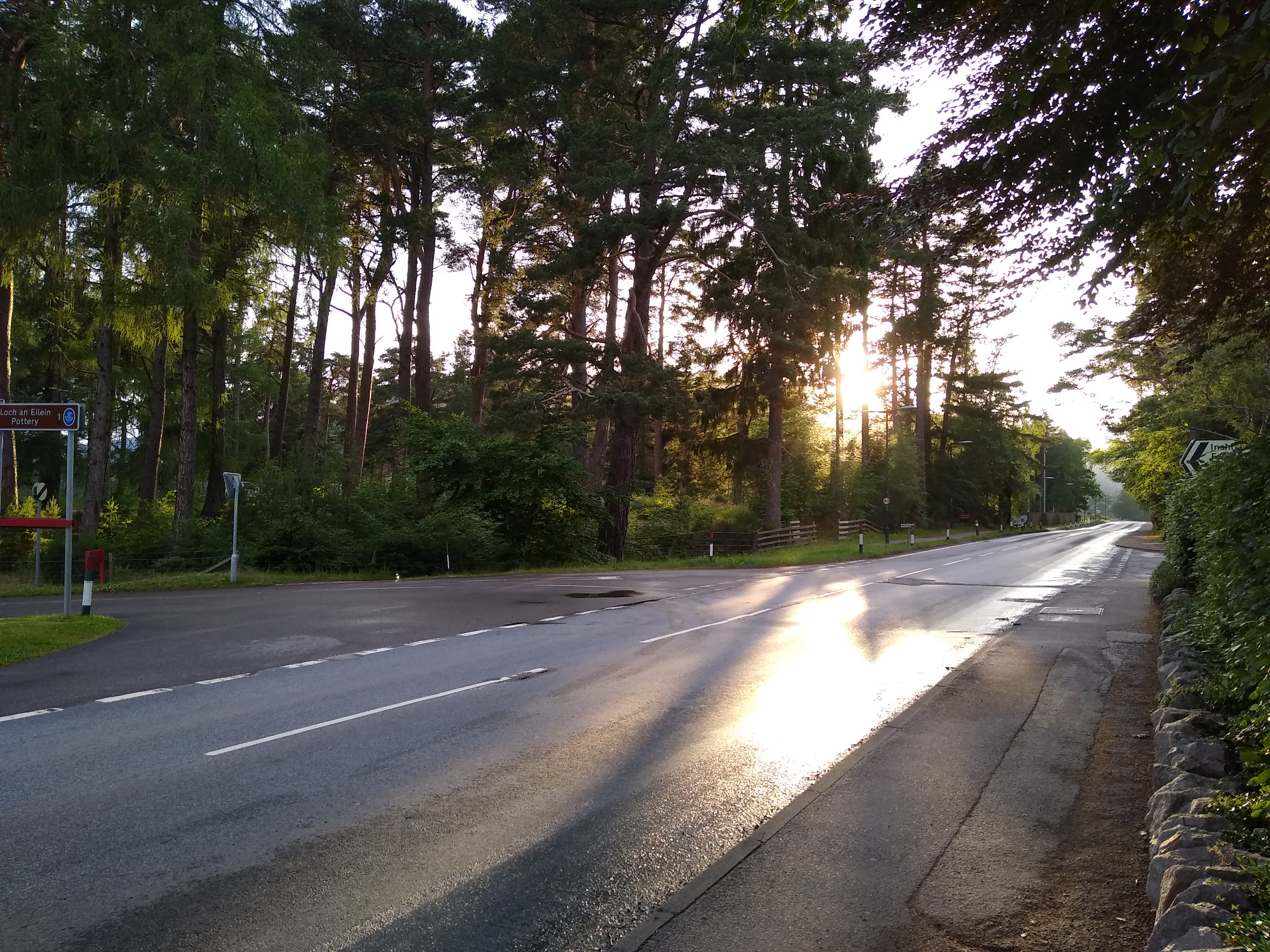
