= Biggar Water =

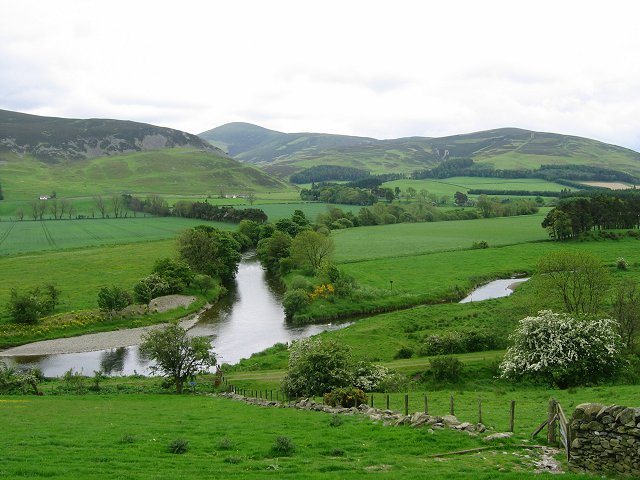
- Confluence of the Biggar Water and Tweed

- Location within Scotland

Location
- Country: Scotland, United Kingdom
- Council area: South Lanarkshire
- OS grid reference: NT045375

Physical characteristics
- Mouth: Confluence with the River Tweed
  - coordinates: 55.603074°N 3.377176°W

Biggar Water is a river in Lanarkshire and Peeblesshire, in the Southern Uplands of Scotland.

It forms part of the River Tweed system. It rises, as Biggar Burn, in the north-east of the parish of Biggar, South Lanarkshire and flows about 6 3/4 miles (10.9 km) generally south-westerly toward the town of Biggar, where it becomes Biggar Water. It then flows about 5 miles (8.0 km) eastwards before its confluence with the Tweed 3/4 mile (1.2 km) mile north-east of Drumelzier in Peeblesshire.

== See also ==
- List of rivers of Scotland
- List of places in the Scottish Borders
- List of places in Scotland
