= River Gaur =

River in Perth and Kinross, Scotland

Coordinates: 56.6795°N 4.4797°W

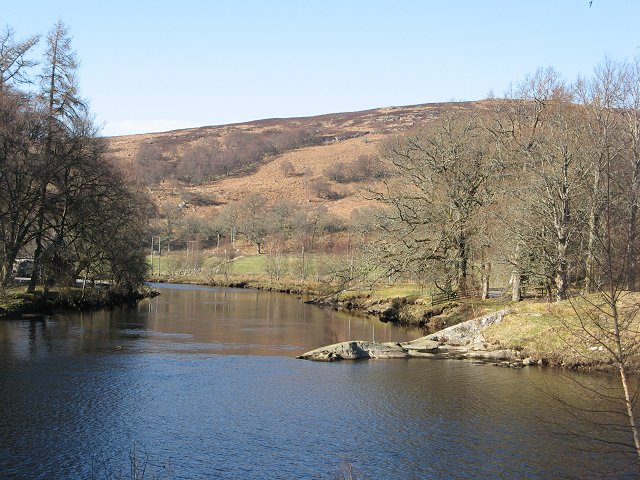
River Gaur

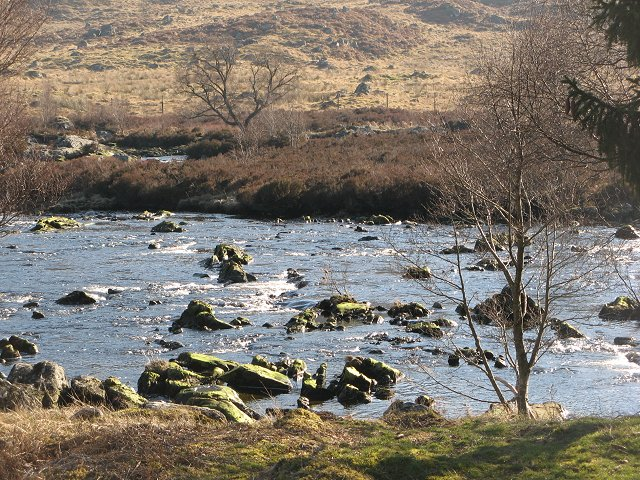
River Gaur

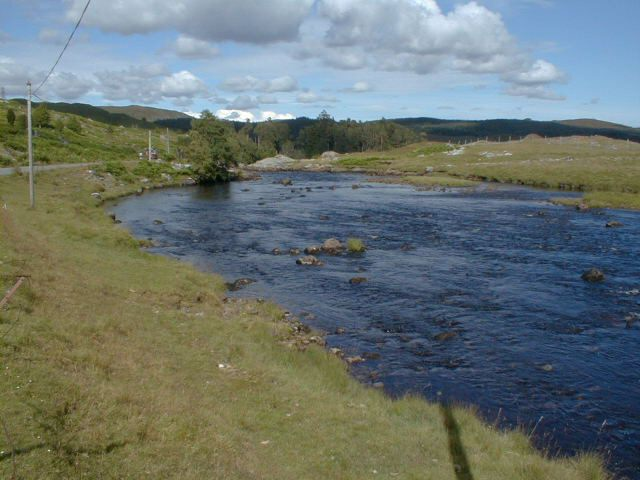
River Gaur on the road to Rannoch Station

The River Gaur (Scottish Gaelic: Gamhair / Uisge Ghamhair) is a river in Perthshire which enters Loch Rannoch.
