= Loch Laidon =

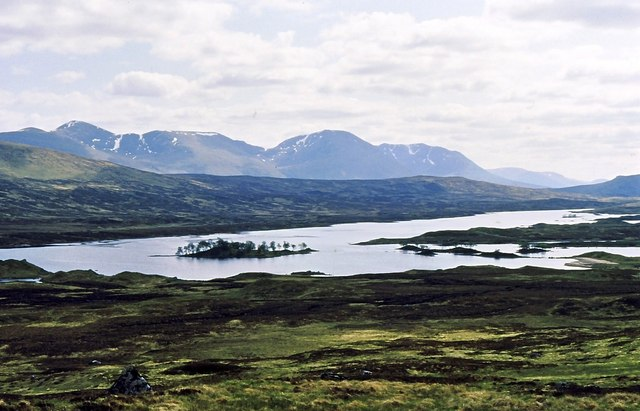
- The view from the path that crosses Rannoch Moor. The small wooded island is Eilean Lubhair, whilst in the distance are the Munro's of Beinn a Chreachain and Beinn Achaladair with the flat topped Meall Buidhe between them.

- Location within Argyll and Bute
- Coordinates: 56.655°N 4.6418°W
- Type: freshwater loch
- Primary inflows: Abhainn Bà
- Primary outflows: Garbh Ghaoir
- Max. length: 8.851 km (5.500 mi)
- Max. width: 1.207 km (0.750 mi)
- Surface area: 483 ha (1,190 acres)
- Average depth: 35 ft (11 m)
- Max. depth: 128 ft (39 m)
- Shore length^{1}: 37.8 km (23.5 mi)
- Surface elevation: 282 m (925 ft)
- Islands: 18
- ^{1} Shore length is not a well-defined measure.

Loch Laidon or Loch Lydoch or Loch Luydan is a long thin freshwater loch, on a southwest to northeast orientation, with outlets on the southwest side, that form the loch into a walkingstick with two supports, and is located on Rannoch Moor on the boundary of both Argyll and Bute and Perthshire in the Scottish West Highlands, within the Highland council area of Scotland. The largest of the western arms is 1.5 miles in length. A new species or sub-species of brown trout was discovered in Loch Laidon in late 2018
