= Gowk stane =

Standing stones and glacial erratics in Scotland

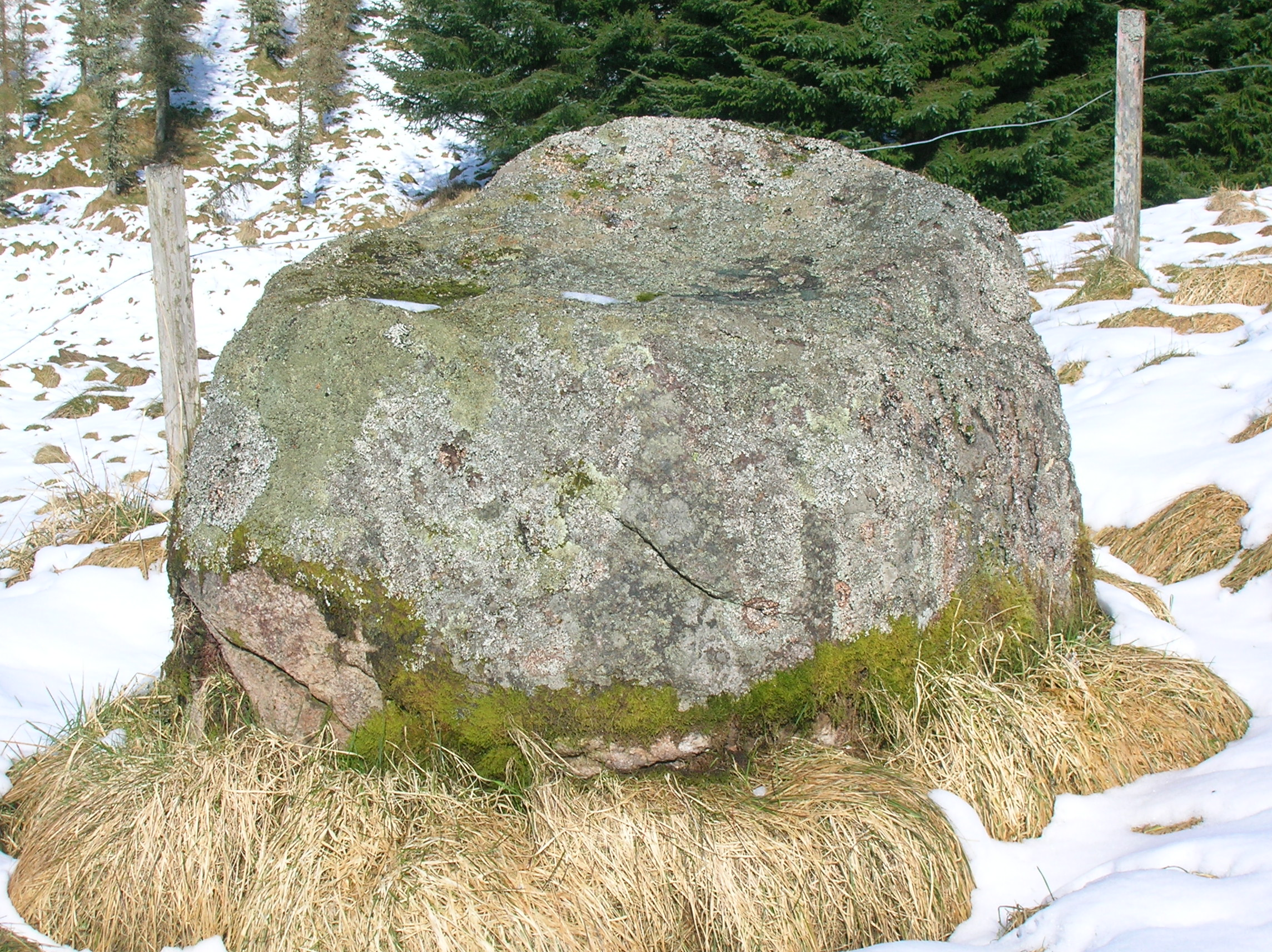
The gowk stane at Laigh Overmuir

The name gowk stane (English: cuckoo stone or fool's stone) has been applied to certain standing stones and glacial erratics in Scotland, often found in prominent geographical situations. Other spelling variants, such as gowke, gouk, gouke, goilk, goik, gok, goke, gook are found.

== Etymology ==
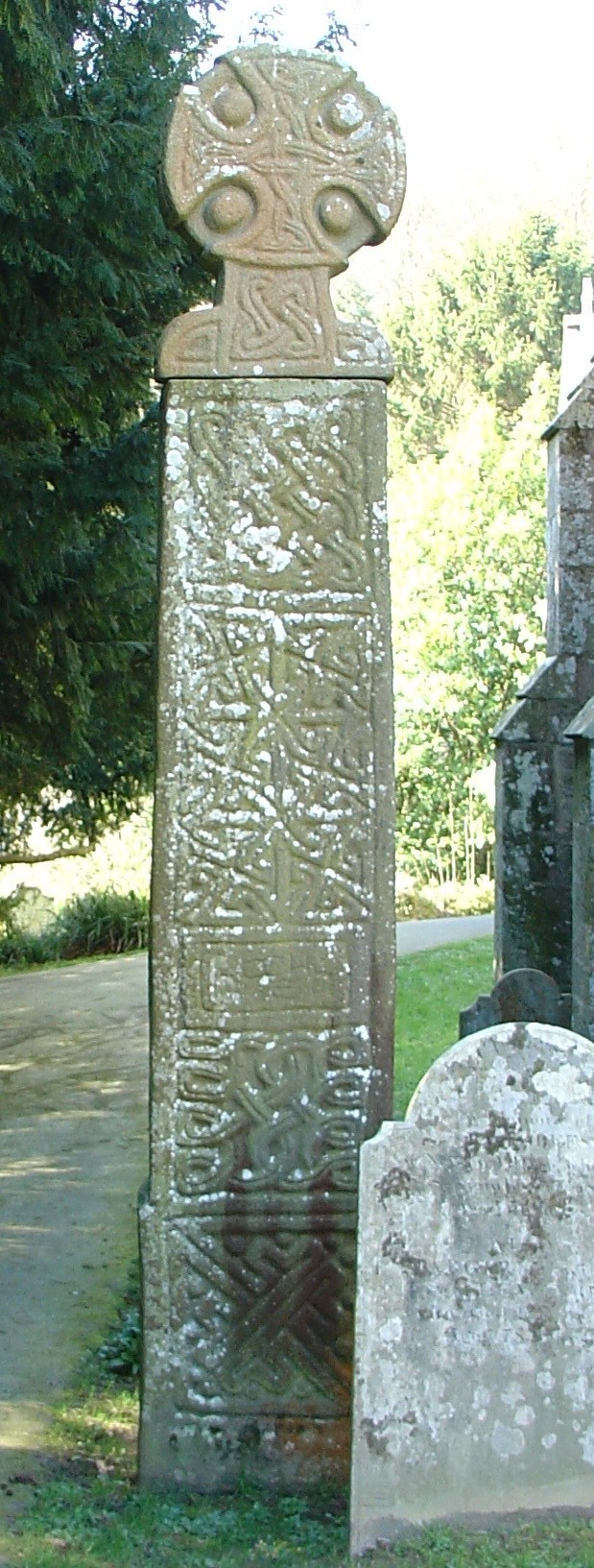
Saint Brynach's cross in Nevern, Wales

Gowk in Scots means a common cuckoo (Cuculus canorus), but also a stupid person or fool. The word, from Middle English goke, was borrowed from Old Norse gaukr 'cuckoo'. The word was replaced in south and central England by the French loan word coucou after the Norman Conquest. The cuckoo family gets its English and scientific names from the call of the bird.

== Cuckoo folklore ==
Celtic mythology in particular is rich in references to cuckoos and the surviving folklore gives clues as to why some stones were given the gowk name.

The term gowk is perhaps best known in the context of the old Gowk's Day, the Scottish April Fools' Day, originally held on April 13 when the cuckoo begins to call, and when children were sent on a gowk hunt, a harmless prank involving pointless errands.

Gowk meant both cuckoo and fool; the latter were thought to be fairy-touched. The call of the cuckoo was believed to beckon the souls of the dead, and the cuckoo was thought to be able to travel back and forth between the worlds of the living and the dead.

It was once commonly thought that the first appearance of a cuckoo also brought about a "gowk storm", a furious spring storm.

Cuckoos were said to have the power of prophesy and could foretell a person's lifespan, the number of their children and when they would marry.

It has also been suggested that the gowk or fool originated in the Dark Ages as a name for the Britons, given by the Saxon invaders, and carried some of the meaning of the Devil in the context of an arch foe, who is likened to the fool.

In the Outer Hebrides a cuckoo's call heard when a person was hungry was bad luck, but the opposite was true if the person had recently eaten.

== The gowk stones ==
The use of the term gowk at these sites suggests a link with springtime and some of the surviving legends associated with standing stones do have a link with the heralding of spring by the first cuckoo of that season to arrive. In the churchyard at Nevern in Wales is an old stone cross, carved with intricate knotwork. Villagers of Nevern would wait for their "harbinger of spring" and on 7 April, St Brynach's feast day, the first cuckoo of the year would arrive from Africa, alighting on the cross and singing to announce the arrival of spring.

A local belief of the Gaelic-speaking community on the Isle of Lewis was that when the sun rose on midsummer morn, the "shining one" walked along the stone avenue at Callanish, his arrival heralded by the cuckoo's call.

The cuckoo traditionally sends forth its first call in spring from the gowk stone at Lisdivin in Northern Ireland.

A few cuckoo stones are present at sites in England and Cornwall.

=== The Laigh Overmuir Gowk Stane ===
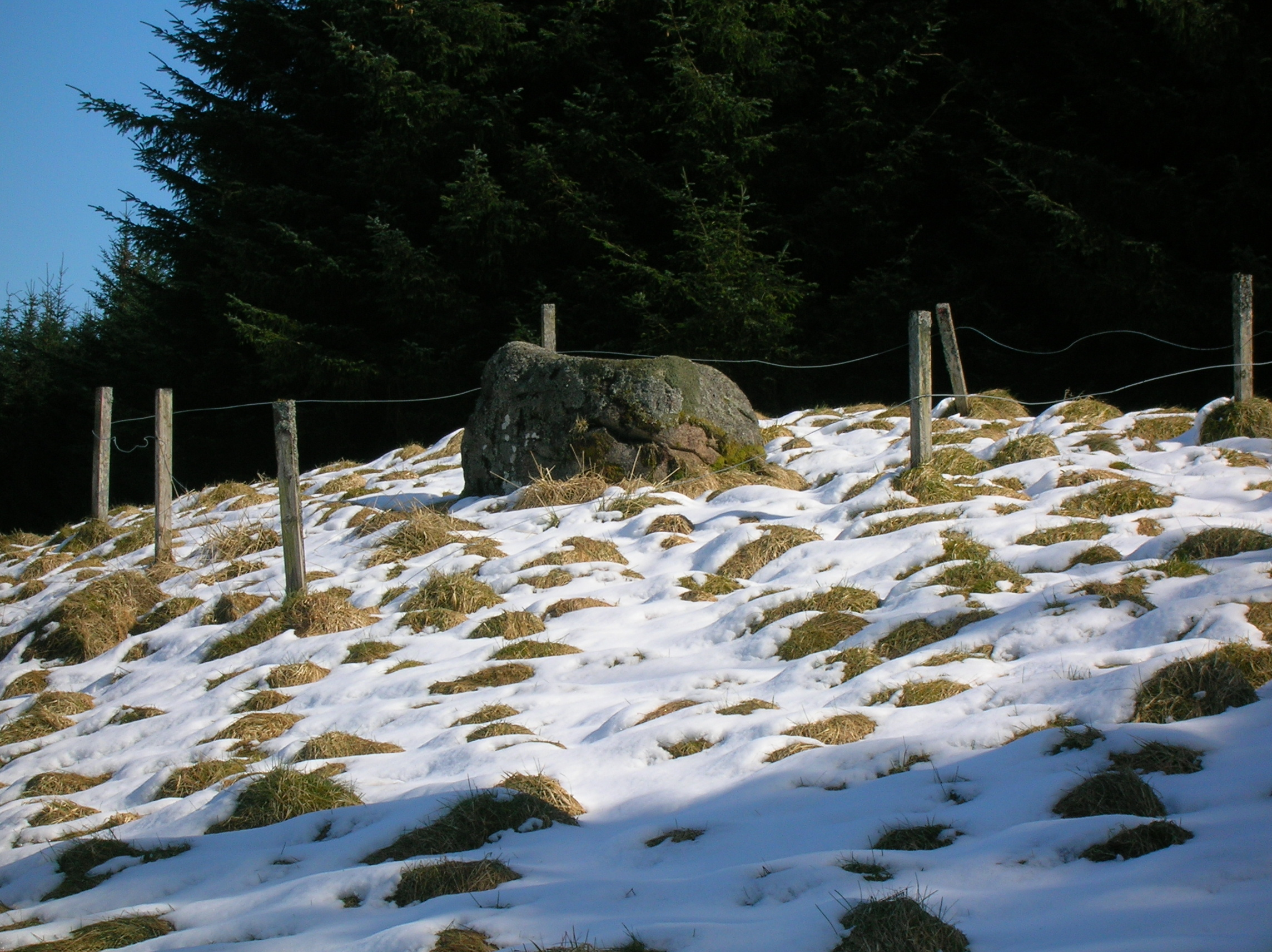
A view from the burn

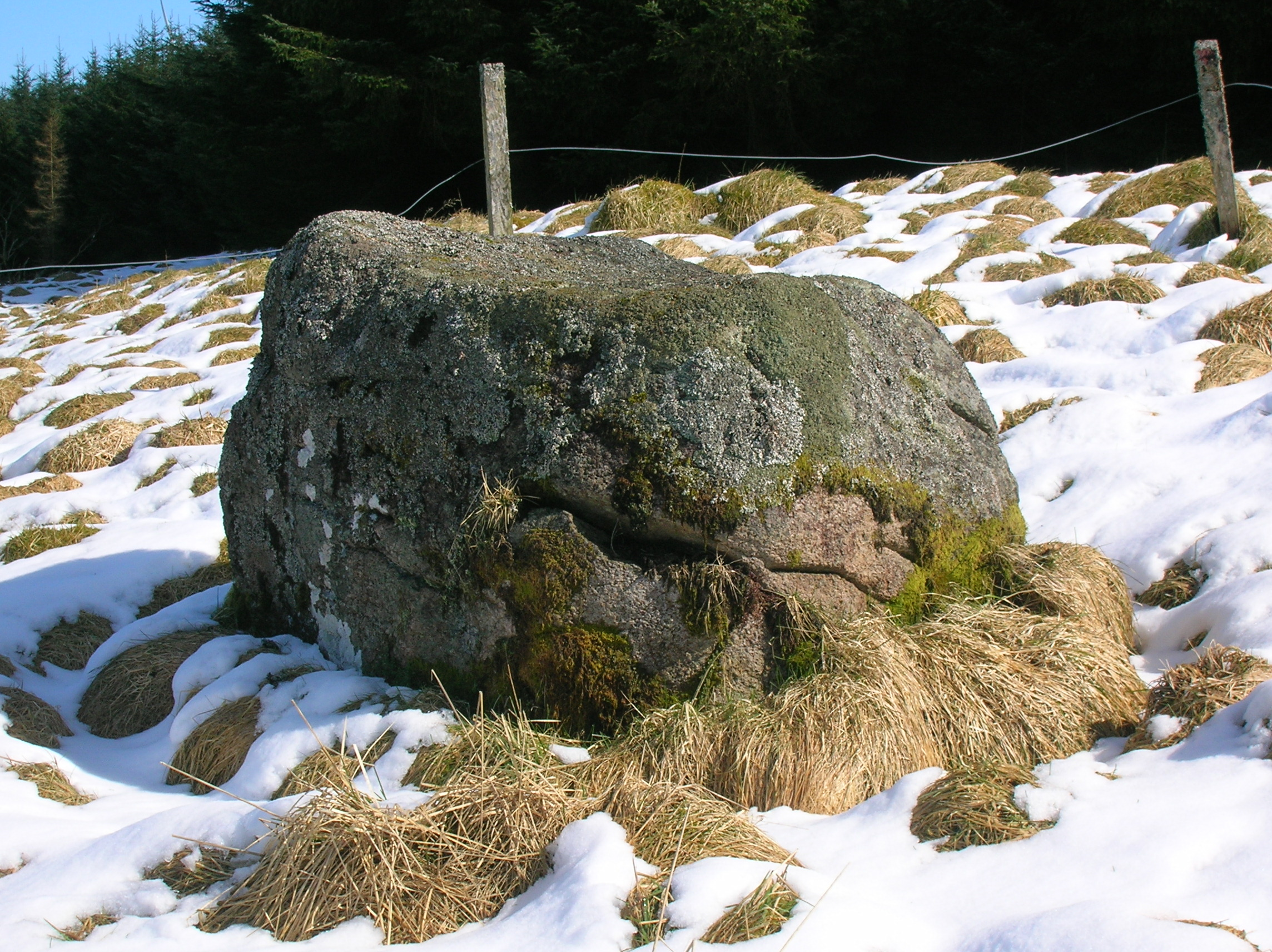
The stone from the west

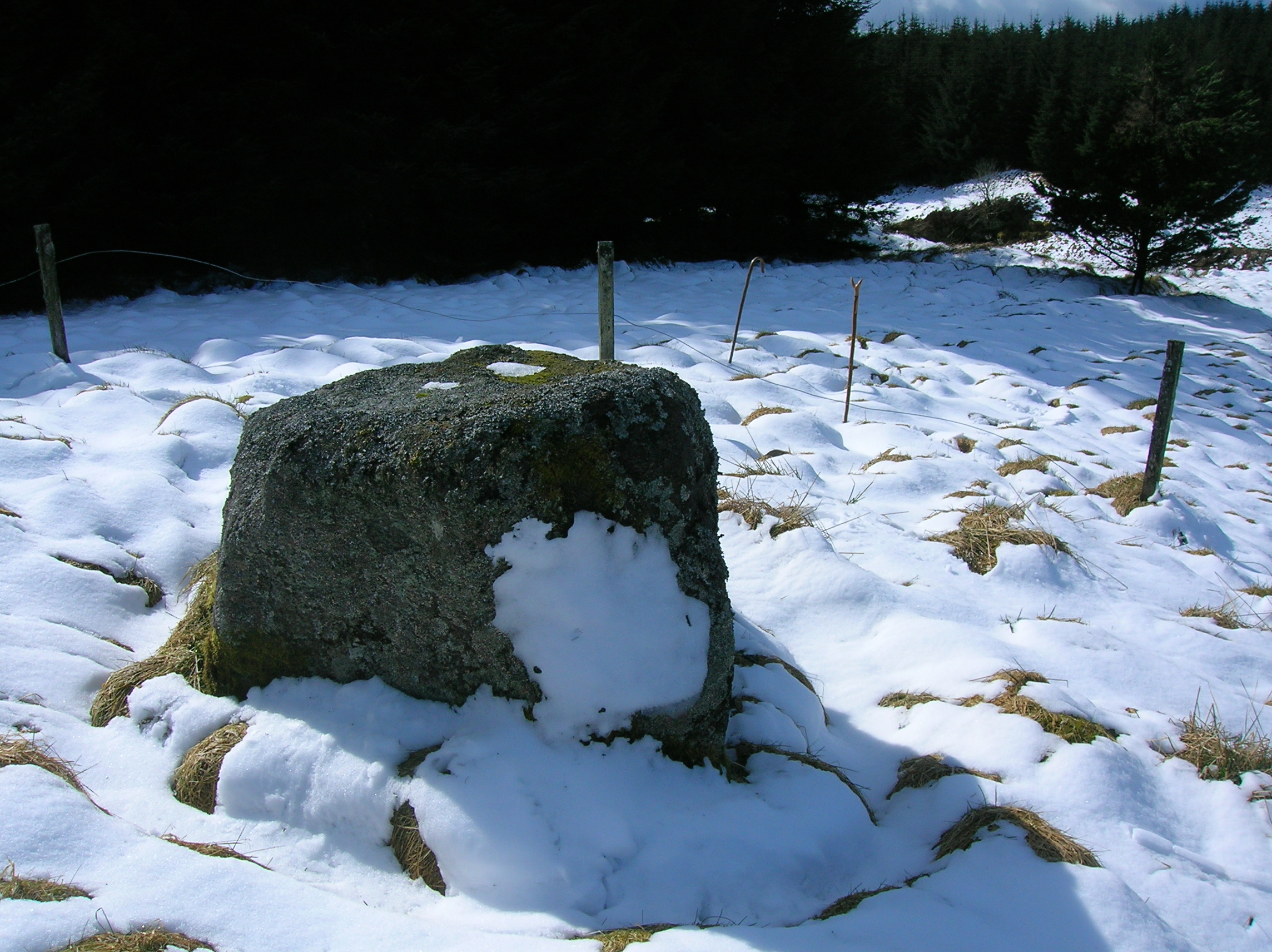
The stone from the north

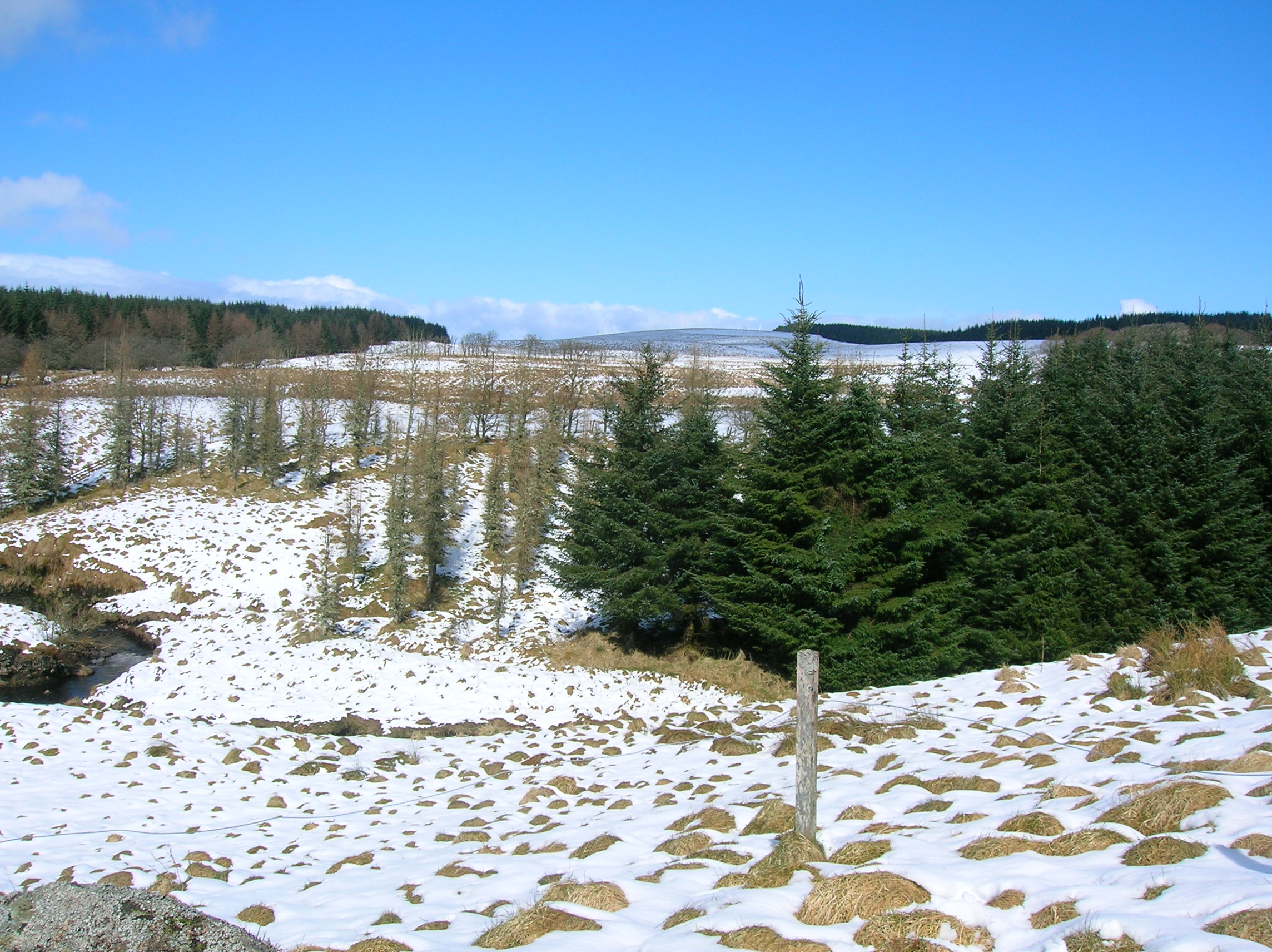
The view from the Gowk Stane, looking north

== Other uses ==
The various gowk stones often had other functions, such as acting as boundary markers or meeting places in what may have sometimes been featureless landscapes. The gowk stone at Whitelee may have been used as a pulpit of sorts by ministers preaching at conventicles held on this remote spot in Covenanting times.

=== Gowk stone sites ===
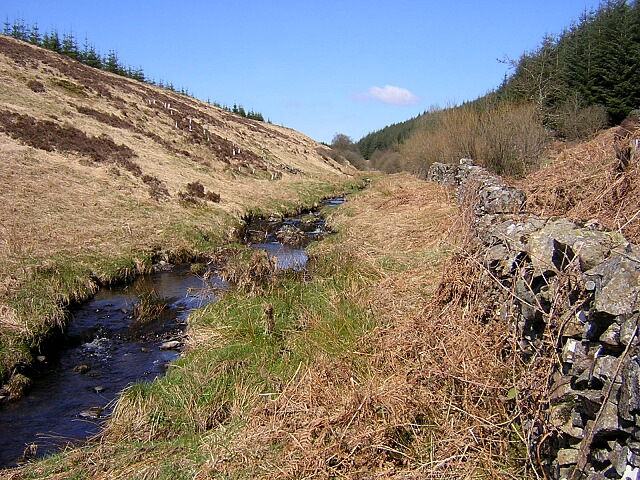
The Gowkstane Burn Forest of Ae

- Gauk Stane, on Little Hareshaw Muir, Shotts, Lanarkshire.
- Gowkstane, near Strathblane on the lane from Milndavie above the Eden Kiln suburb.
- Gowkstone, near Hazleden one mile south-west of Mearns near Glasgow. It was known as the Speaking Stone.
- Gowk Stane, Laigh Overmuir, Darvel, East Ayrshire. A glacial erratic boulder in a prominent position.
- High Gowk Craig, Muirshiel Hills, Largs, North Ayrshire.
- Low Gowk Craig, Muirshiel Hills, Largs, North Ayrshire.
- Gowk Stane, Dumbrock Muir, Strathblane. A large glacial erratic.
- Gowk Stone, Lisdivin, County Tyrone, Northern Ireland. The gowk traditionally sent forth its first call in spring from this stone.
- Gowk Stone, Parish of Glenmuick, Tullich and Glengairn, Aberdeenshire. This standing stone is located at NGR NJ 454 004.
- Gowk Stone, Auchencorth, Penicuik, Lothians. This stone sits in a commanding site above the River North Esk and is also referred to as the Auchencorth Stone, meaning 'place of the fold or stone circle'. Located at OS NT20425764.
- Gowk Stone, Easter Glasslie, Falkland, Fife.
- Gowk Stone, Great Cumbrae Island. A natural standing stone.
- Gouklan Stone, Great Cumbrae Island. A standing stone in Standing Stone Plantation near the town of Millport.
- Gowk Stane, Oyne, Inverurie. NJ677257. A standing stone, about 2 metres high, standing on the brow of a hill.
- Gowk Stone, Old Kilpatrick, Dumbartonshire. A ruined house had this name.
- Gowk Stone, Dyce, South Aberdeenshire.
- Gowk Stone, Caskieben, Aberdeenshire.
- Gowk Stone, Methlick, Aberdeenshire.
- Gowk Stone, St Johns Town of Dalry, Dumfries & Galloway
- Gouk Stone, Kinaldie, Hatton of Fintray, Aberdeenshire. Same as Gowk Stone Caskieben and Gowk Stone Dyce (NJ 834 151)
- Gowk Stanes, Near the Loup of Fintry, Fintry, Stirlingshire

=== Cuckoo stones ===
- Cuckoo Stone, Durrington, Wiltshire, OS SU146433. Alfred Watkins stated that this, now recumbent, standing stone was associated with an alignment originating from Woodhenge.
- Cuckoo Stones, situated at the break of slope above South Dean Beck, Haworth, Yorkshire. Two cuckoo stones exist here.
- Cuckoo Rock, Penzance, Cornwall. OS SW 4406 3392. This standing stone is now known as the Carfury Stone.
- Cuckoo Stone, Matlock, Derbyshire. A pointed granite boulder on what is now the 11th fairway of Matlock Golf Club, formerly referred to as a cock-crow stone.

=== Related stones ===
- Gogar Stane, a single standing stone in the middle of a field on the west side of the Gogar area, south of Edinburgh Airport, Scotland. Gogar may derive from cog, a Celtic word for a cuckoo.
