= Stronend =

Hill in Stirlingshire, Scotland

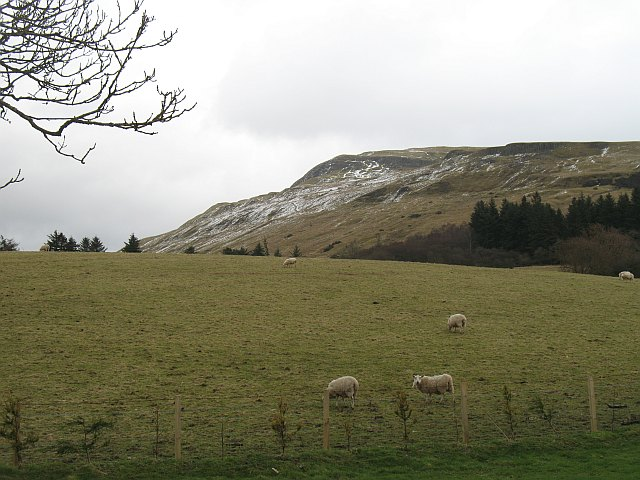
- The steep northern slopes of Stronend

Highest point
- Elevation: 511 m (1,677 ft)
- Prominence: 286 m (938 ft)
- Listing: Marilyn
- Coordinates: 56°04′42″N 4°12′15″W

Geography
- Location: Stirlingshire, Scotland
- Parent range: Fintry Hills
- OS grid: NS629895
- Topo map: OS Landranger 57

Stronend (511 m) is the highest peak of the Fintry Hills in Stirlingshire, Scotland. Standing above the village of Fintry, it provides excellent views of Loch Lomond and The Trossachs to the north.
