= Gargunnock Hills =

Range of hills in Stirling, Scotland

Coordinates: 56.096°N 4.111°W

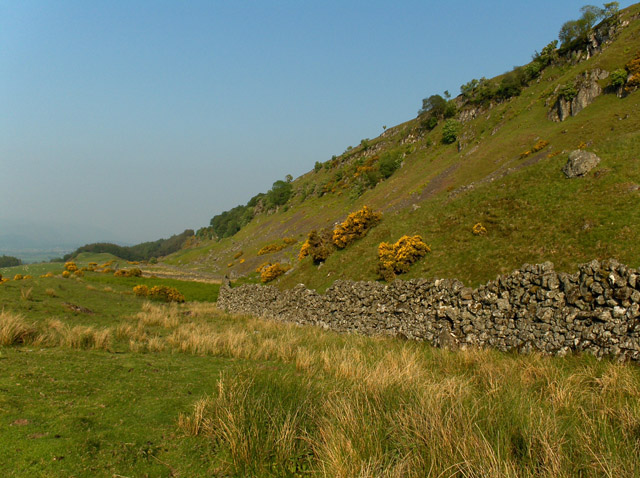
The northern escarpment of the Gargunnock Hills, south of the village of Gargunnock

The Gargunnock Hills are a range of hills west of the city of Stirling, Scotland. They culminate in the peak of Carleatheran, whose 485-metre (1,591 ft) summit is crowned by a trigonometrical pillar. The Gargunnock Hills are separated from the Fintry Hills to their west by the valley of the Backside Burn. To their east are the Touch Hills, whilst to the south is Carron Valley Reservoir. The hills are defined to the north by a 300-metre (980 ft) craggy escarpment overlooking the glen of the River Forth. At the foot of this scarp are the villages of Gargunnock and Kippen.

The hills drain principally to the south; Mary Glyn's Burn and Burnfoot Burn combine with Gourlay's Burn and Backside Burn to form Endrick Water. The waters of Earl's Burn are dammed at two places to form Earlsburn Reservoir No. 1 and Earlsburn Reservoir no. 2. The few streams which fall to the north include Gargunnock Burn which plunges over the scarp at Downie's Loup, and Leckie Burn which flows through Loch Logan and then St. Colm's Glen. Additionally two streams, the Easter Blackspout and the Western Blackspout flow into a reservoir from the hills and then on to join Leckie Burn.

== Geology ==
The hills are composed of volcanic rocks formed in the Carboniferous period and which have proved more resistant to erosion than the surrounding sedimentary rocks. The bedrock across the larger part of the area is the basaltic Gargunnock Hills Lava Member. In stratigraphic order (i.e. youngest/uppermost first), the remaining subdivisions of the Clyde Plateau Volcanic Formation which outcrop on the steep northern scarp of the hills, are:

- Spout of Ballochleam Lava Member (basaltic lava)
- Slackgun Volcaniclastic Member (sandstone, conglomerate)
- Skiddaw Lava Member (basaltic lava)

The trachybasaltic Lees Hill Lava Member is also present around Lees Hill and east to beyond Tulmore. It is the Spout Of Ballochleam lavas which form the cliffs of the northern scarp. Substantial amounts of landslide material are arrayed beneath these cliffs.

The larger part of the plateau surface is covered by peat formed during the Holocene epoch.
