= Fintry Kirk =

Fintry Kirk, Stirlingshire
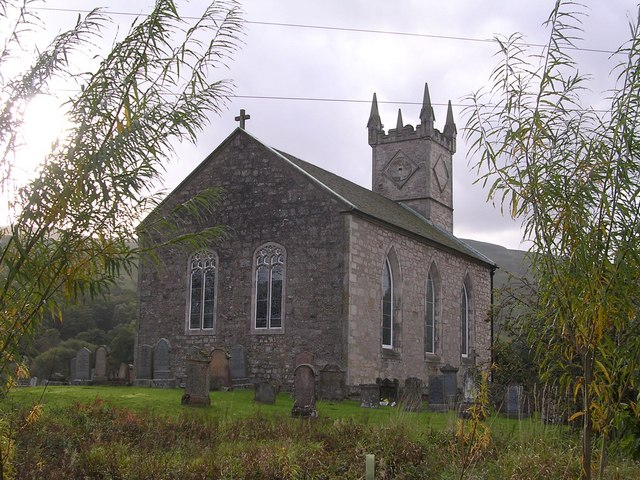
- Fintry Kirk, Stirlingshire
- Fintry Kirk, Stirlingshire
- 56.0488°N 4.20625°W
- Location: Crow Rd, Fintry G63 0XG
- Country: Scotland
- Denomination: Presbytery (church polity)
- Website: https://fintrykirk.chessck.co.uk/

History
- Status: Parish church
- Consecrated: 1823

Architecture
- Functional status: Active
- Architectural type: Church

Administration
- Diocese: Presbytery of Stirling

Fintry Kirk is in the village of Fintry in Stirlingshire, Scotland. Fintry is a Church of Scotland Parish in the Presbytery of Stirling. The kirk is located to the East of the village. The parish minister for Fintry is shared with Balfron with the Manse located there.

== The building ==
The Category B listed building, was built in 1823 using stone from the area and stands on a site that has been a site of Christian worship for centuries.

Behind the pulpit is a stained glass war memorial with the names of the men and women from the village who died during World War I and World War II. This has recently undergone renovation.

At the front of the Kirk is a cantilevered staircase, one of only two that have survived to today.

== History ==
The parish is first mentioned in 1207 and was originally dedicated to St Modan and was under control of the Collegiate Church of the Blessed Virgin Mary in Dunbarton. The only pre-Reformation vicar known by name is Stephen Culross in 1539.

From 1560 Fintry shared a minister with neighbouring Strathblane and Campsie, this being Mr John Stoddart who was assisted by a reader, George Watson. However, complaint was made to the Privy Council that a James Galbraith of Kilcreuch had commandeered the manse and glebe. The same James Galbraith is noted as the main local force in removing the Catholic presence from the parish, and clearly thought he deserved their property for his actions.

In 1634 the village had its first university trained minister: David Adamson who received an MA from Glasgow University in 1619 and served the parish until 1659. In January 1641 Adamson publicly rebuked a group of parishioners for drinking on the Lord's Day at the house of James Provand. As the time in question was 10pm on a Saturday this tells us that the controls limiting activities on the Sabbath ran from sunset to sunset rather than midnight to midnight. This was normal prior to the widespread use of clocks.

In May 1642 Jonet Miller was found guilty of "banning and cursing" and had to pay a fine of 4 merks and spend 4 hours in the public jougs. In January 1643 a Marion Ewing confessed to going to "Christ's Well" at Menteith with other persons, and collected water "to cast on her cattel": despite the well's name, this supersticious activity was frowned upon. A similar incident happened in 1649 involving a David Ewing who brought water to cast on his child from Strathfellen's Well. His sister-in-law Margaret Kessen went with him to get water for her husband's sores, it being bad luck to carry water for two tasks. They were required to spend three Sundays in the pillory, bare-footed and bare-headed.

In 1654 Adamson organised a new school in the parish to combat the ignorance of the children, but noted the difficulty of some children crossing the River Endrick to reach the school. This addressed "a generation without knowledge of God". He introduced a rule for couples getting married that each would have to demonstrate knowledge of the Bible before they could be married.
