= Fintry Hills =

Scotland

Coordinates: 56.071°N 4.167°W

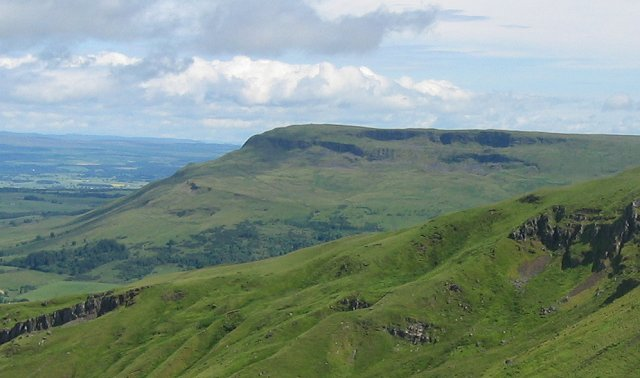
Stronend, at the western margin of the Fintry Hills

The Fintry Hills form the western end of a range of hills which stretch west from the city of Stirling, Scotland. They culminate in the 511-metre (1,677 ft) peak of Stronend, which overlooks Strathendrick and the village of Fintry.

The northern, western and southern sides of the hills are defined by a steep and craggy escarpment, whilst the eastern sides run more gently down into the valley of the Backside Burn and Endrick Water. The Boquhan Burn, which runs initially northeastwards, drops over the northern scarp at the Spout of Ballochleam. Loch Walton lies at the foot of the hills’ southern slopes.

== Geology ==
Like the neighbouring Gargunnock Hills they are composed of volcanic rocks, mainly basaltic lavas and tuffs erupted during the Chadian to Asbian substages of the Carboniferous period. The igneous rocks are named as the Clyde Plateau Volcanic Formation, itself a part of the Strathclyde Group. In stratigraphical succession i.e. youngest/uppermost at top, the individual members (subdivisions of a formation) are:

- Spout of Ballochleam Lava Member (microporphyritic basalt)
- Fintry Hills Lava Member (basaltic lava)
- Shelloch Burn Lava Member (trachybasalt)
- Spout of Ballochleam Lava Member (microporphyritic basalt)
- Slackgun Volcaniclastic Member (sandstone, conglomerate)
- Skiddaw Lava Member (basaltic lava)

Stronend, the summit, is not formed from the stratigraphically uppermost member but from the Shelloch Burn lavas since the entire pile is tilted. The northern cliffs and Double Craigs are formed by the Spout of Ballochleam lavas. Substantial amounts of landslip material are arrayed beneath these cliffs. The volcanic sequence sits upon a plinth of sedimentary rocks which from the low ground to the north and west, together with the lower parts of the north and west facing scarp. These are the Clyde Sandstone Formation (sandstone, siltstone, mudstone) and the underlying Ballaggan Formation (mudstone, sandstone, limestone), both of which form part of the Inverclyde Group of the Carboniferous system. In the vicinity of a dun and southeast to Spittalhill by an intrusion of basalt/microgabbro. Dykes of similar composition intrude the lava sequence, notably on the hills' southern flanks.
