= Loup of Fintry =

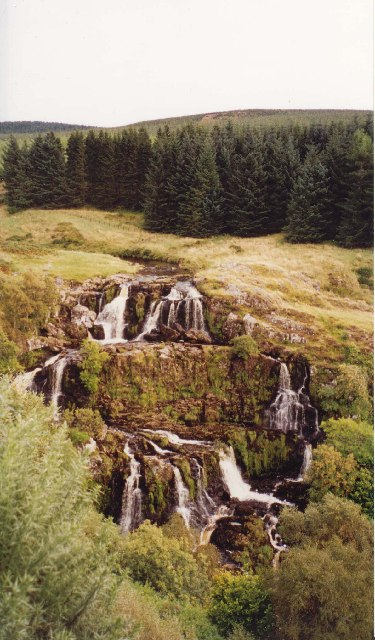
- The Loup of Fintry - Geograph.org.uk

- Location within Scotland
- Location: Fintry, Stirling, Scotland
- Coordinates: 56.04990°N 4.14981°W
- Watercourse: River Endrick

Loup of Fintry is a notable waterfall on the River Endrick around 2 miles to the east of Fintry in Scotland and 17 miles from Stirling, 10 miles from Denny. The total height of the waterfalls is 28.6 m (94 ft) Lowp or "Loup" means leap in Scots.

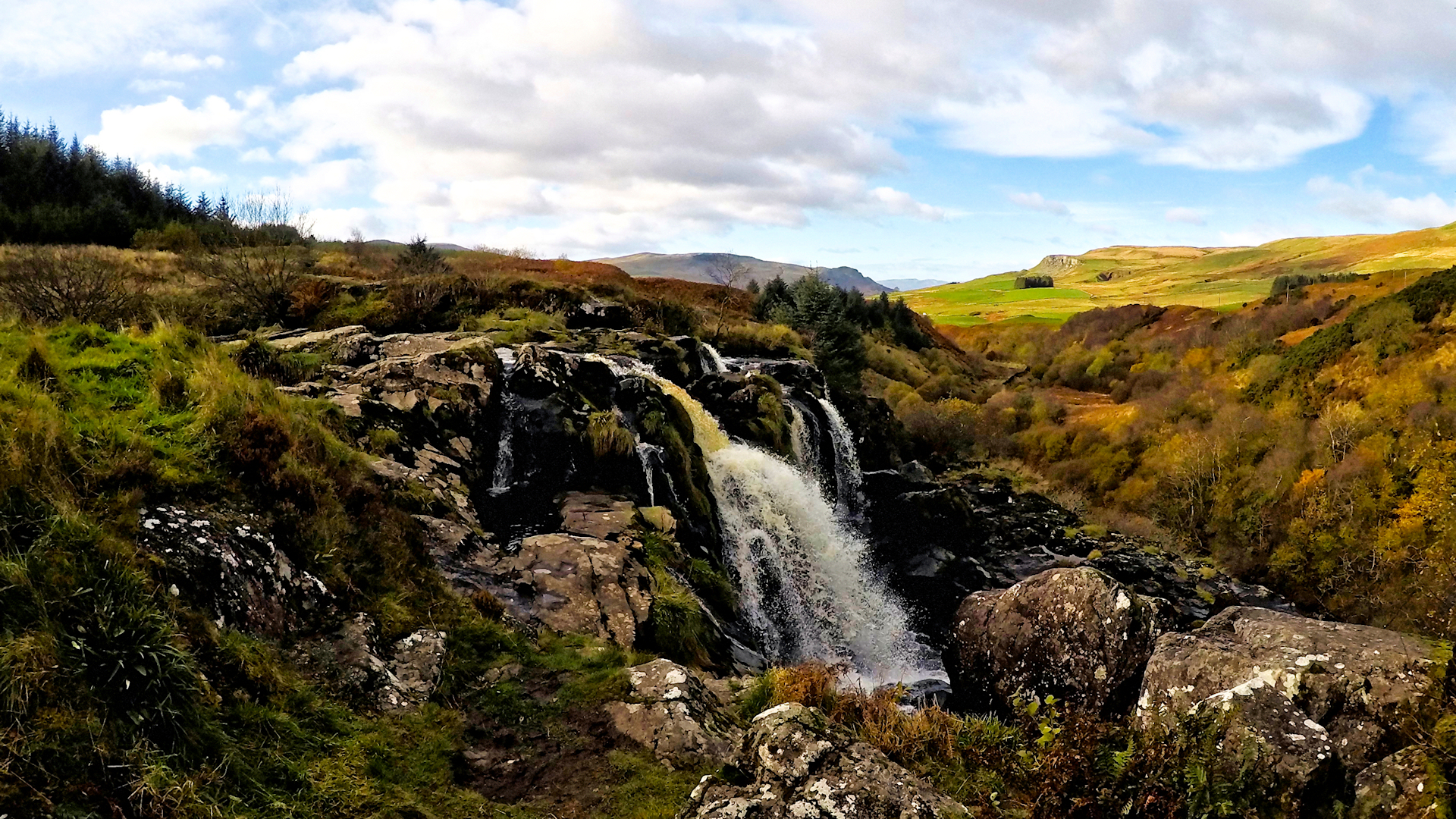
a view of the upper cascade of the Loup of Fintry waterfalls

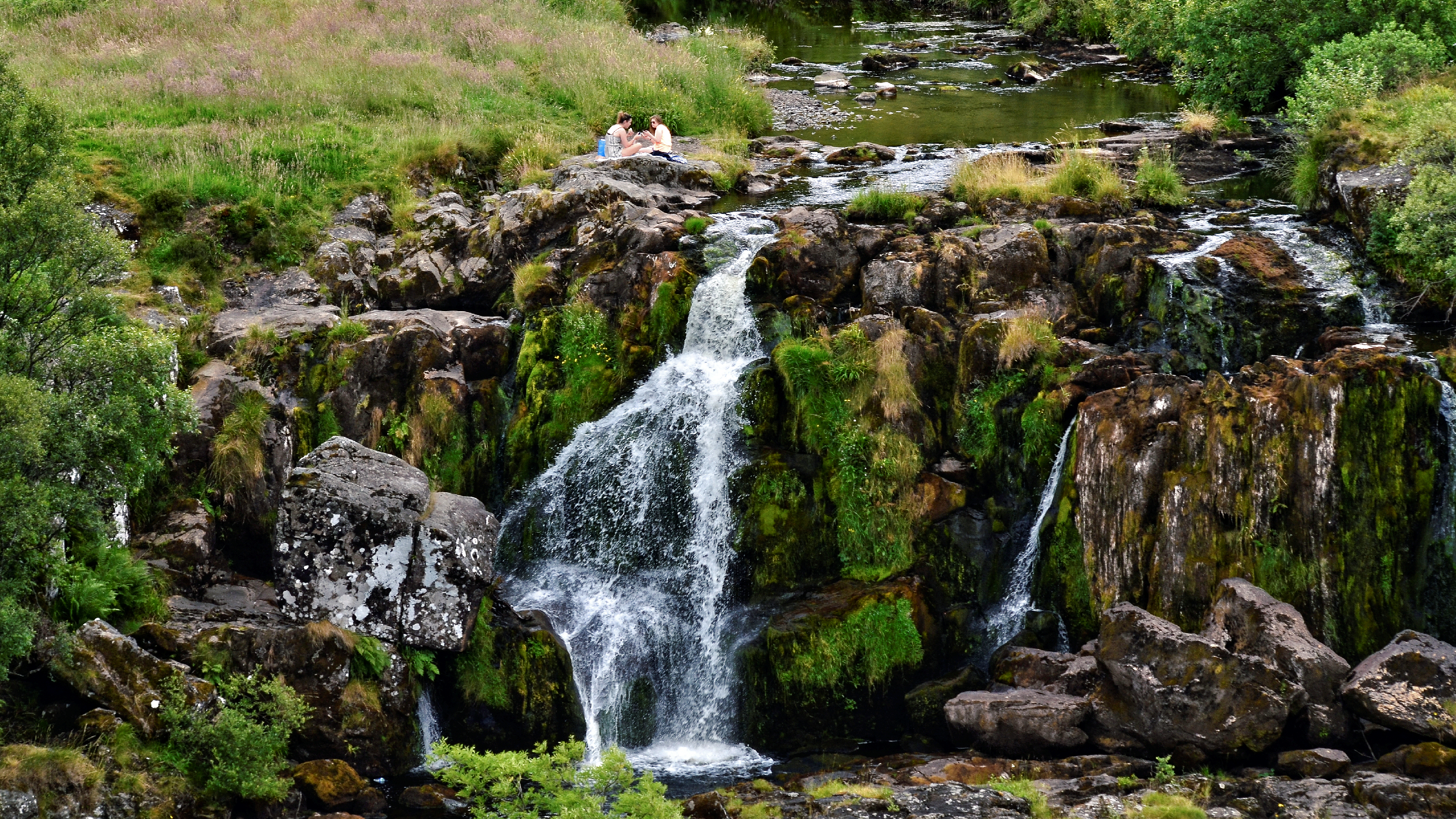
a view of a picnic above the upper cascade of the Loup of Fintry waterfalls

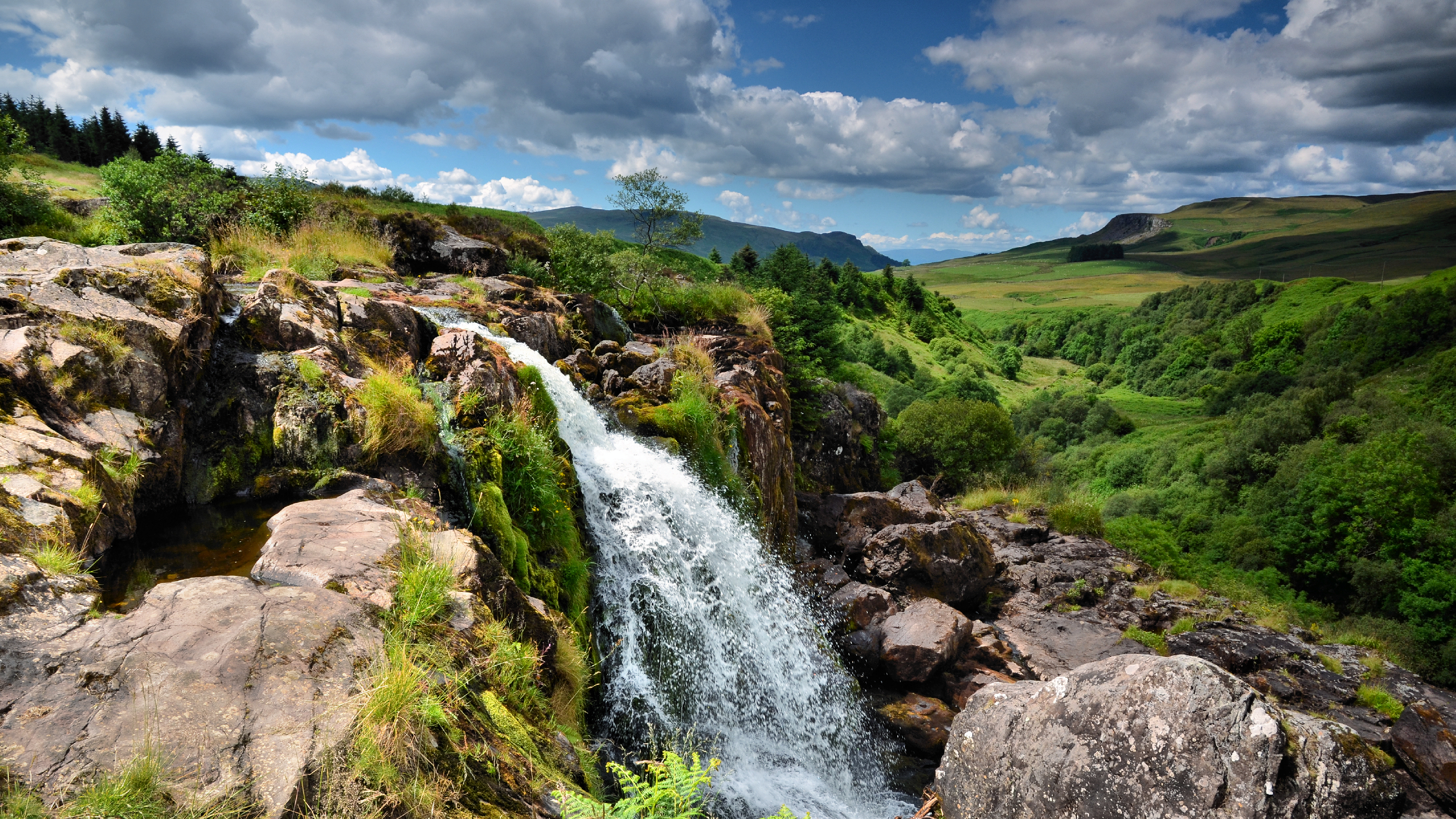
a view of the upper cascade of the Loup of Fintry waterfalls

== See also ==
- Waterfalls of Scotland

https://www.natureflip.com/places/loup-of-fintry-waterfall
