= Cuckoo Stone =

Neolithic standing stone in Wiltshire, England

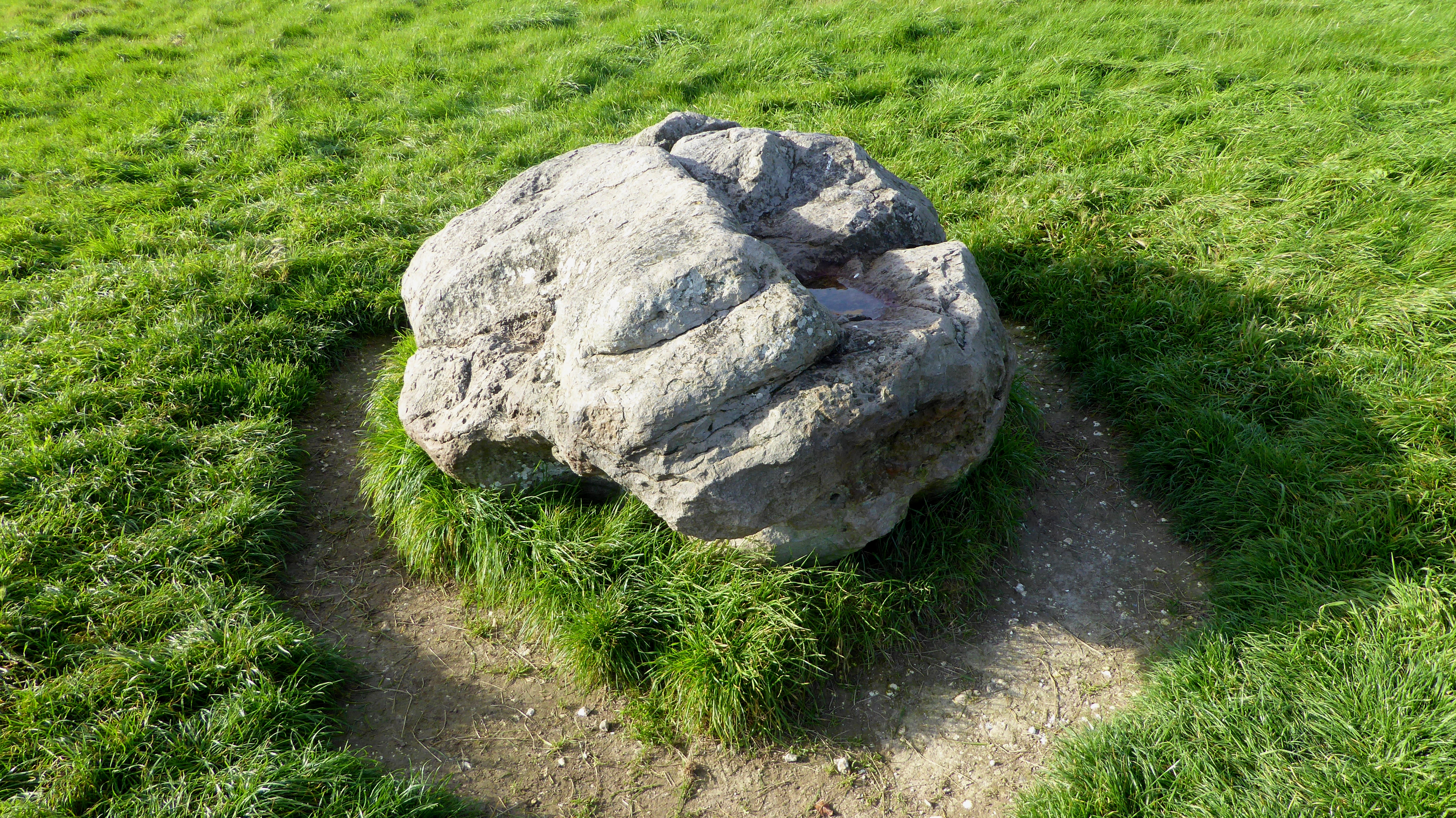

- 51.18923°N 1.79168°W
- Type: Standing stone
- Periods: Neolithic / Bronze Age
- Location: OS SU1465433
- Region: Wiltshire

Site notes
- Excavation dates: 2007
- Archaeologists: Stonehenge Riverside Project
- Condition: Fallen
- Public access: Yes

UNESCO World Heritage Site
- Designated: 1986
- Reference no.: 373

The Cuckoo Stone is a Neolithic or Bronze Age standing stone. The stone, which is now fallen, is in a field near to Woodhenge and Durrington Walls in Wiltshire, England (grid reference SU14654335). It is part of the wider Stonehenge Landscape.

== Description ==
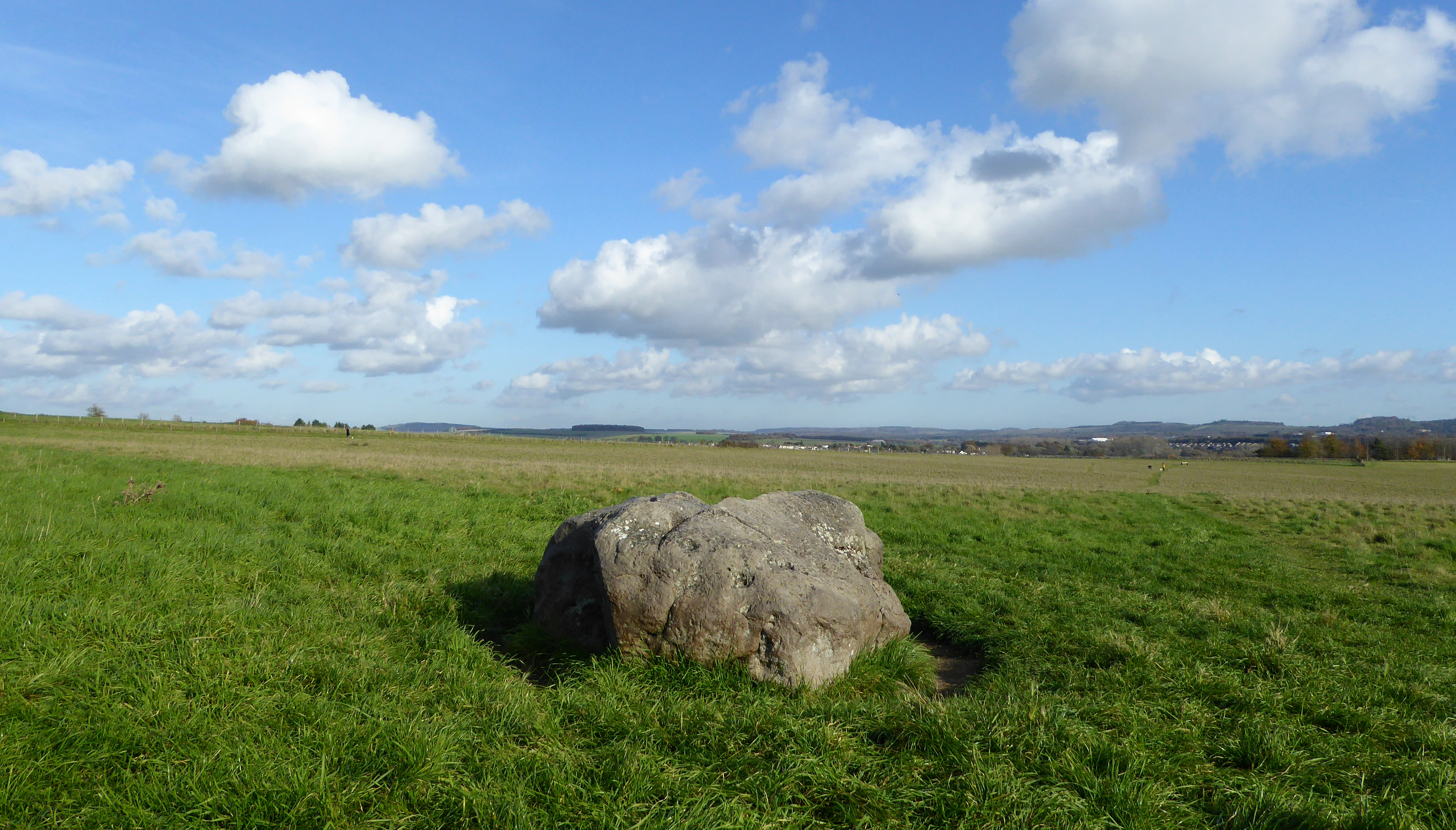
The stone, facing the east

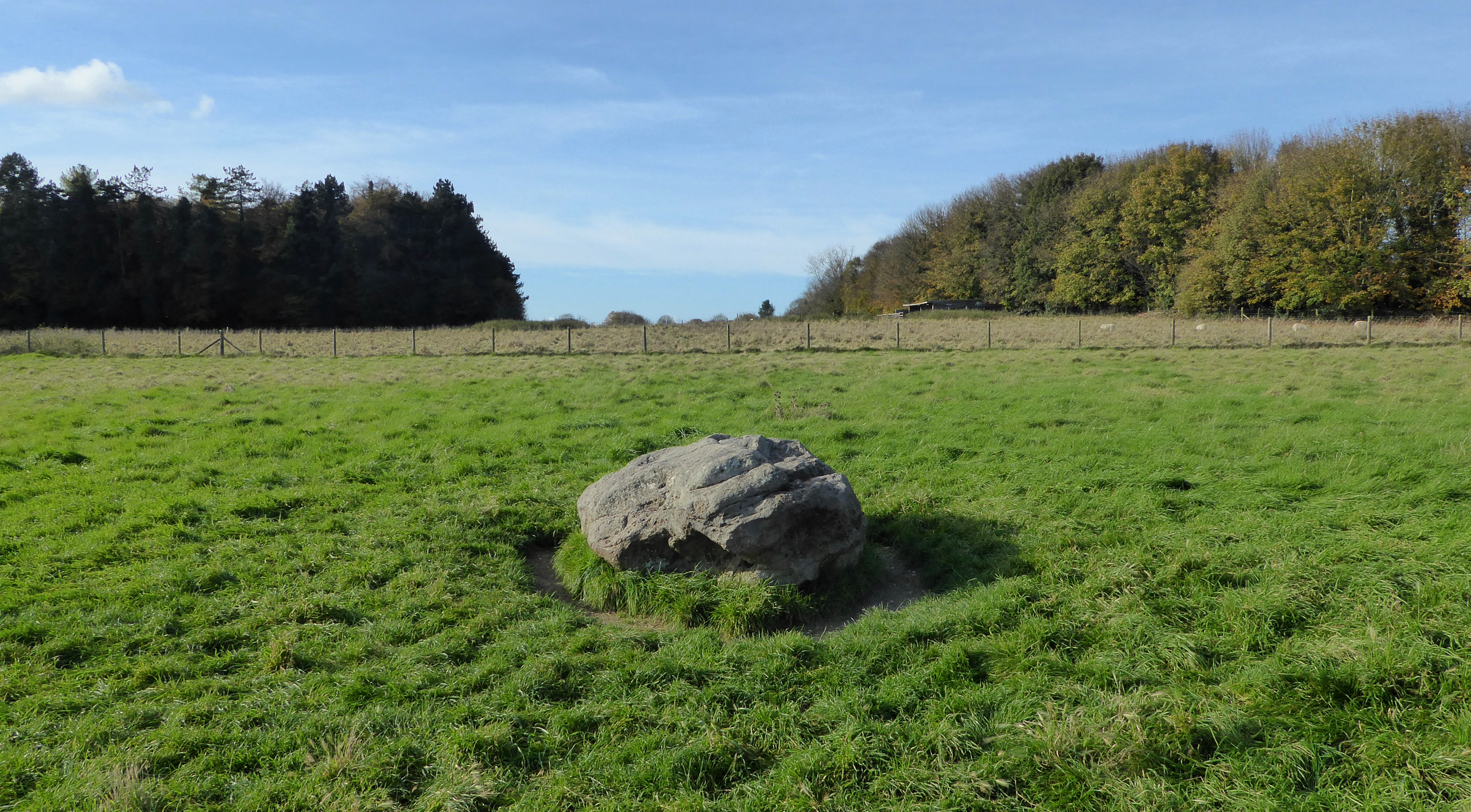
The Stone, facing the west

The Cuckoo Stone is a squat sarsen stone which lies on its side. It is the same type of stone as the largest stones used in the Stonehenge circle. The site of Woodhenge is around 500 metres to the east of the Cuckoo Stone, with Durrington Walls to the northeast. Stonehenge is around 2.5 kilometres to the southwest. The Cuckoo Stone was recorded by Richard Colt-Hoare on his 1810 map of the Stonehenge landscape. The nearest other known sarsen stone is that found within Woodhenge during excavations in 1926–1928.

== Excavations ==
The site was excavated in 2007 as part of the Stonehenge Riverside Project. The excavations revealed the pit in which the stone once sat immediately to the west. The stone was originally a natural feature, which sometime before 2000 BC, was placed in an upright position. A posthole was found in the pit, indicating that a wooden post had been placed in the hole for a time before being replaced by the upright stone. Around 2000 BC the Cuckoo Stone became the focus for several nearby cremation burials.

In the Roman era a rectangular building was constructed southwest of the Cuckoo Stone. The presence of pits and a scatter of coins suggest that the building was a small shrine.

== Gallery ==
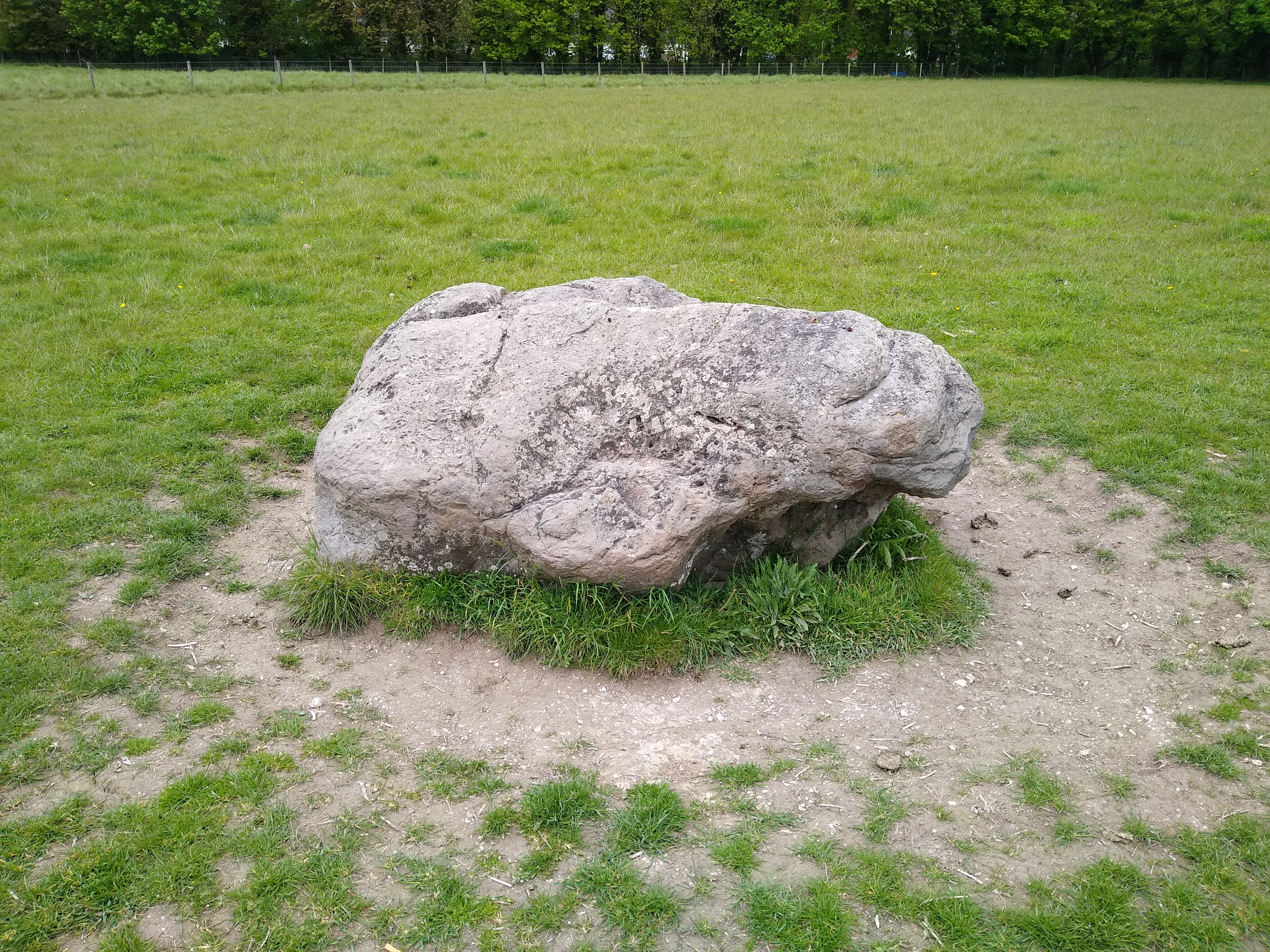

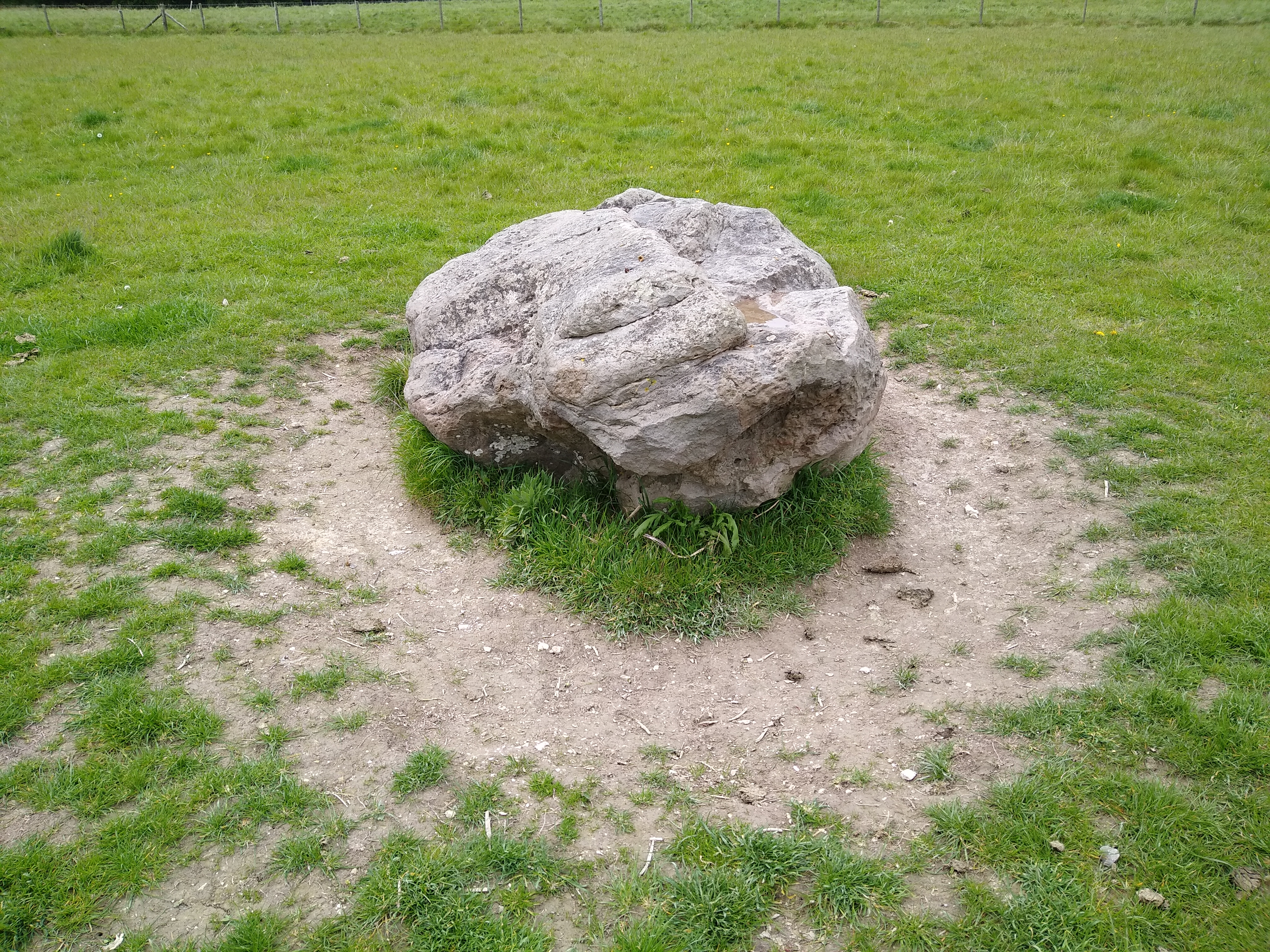

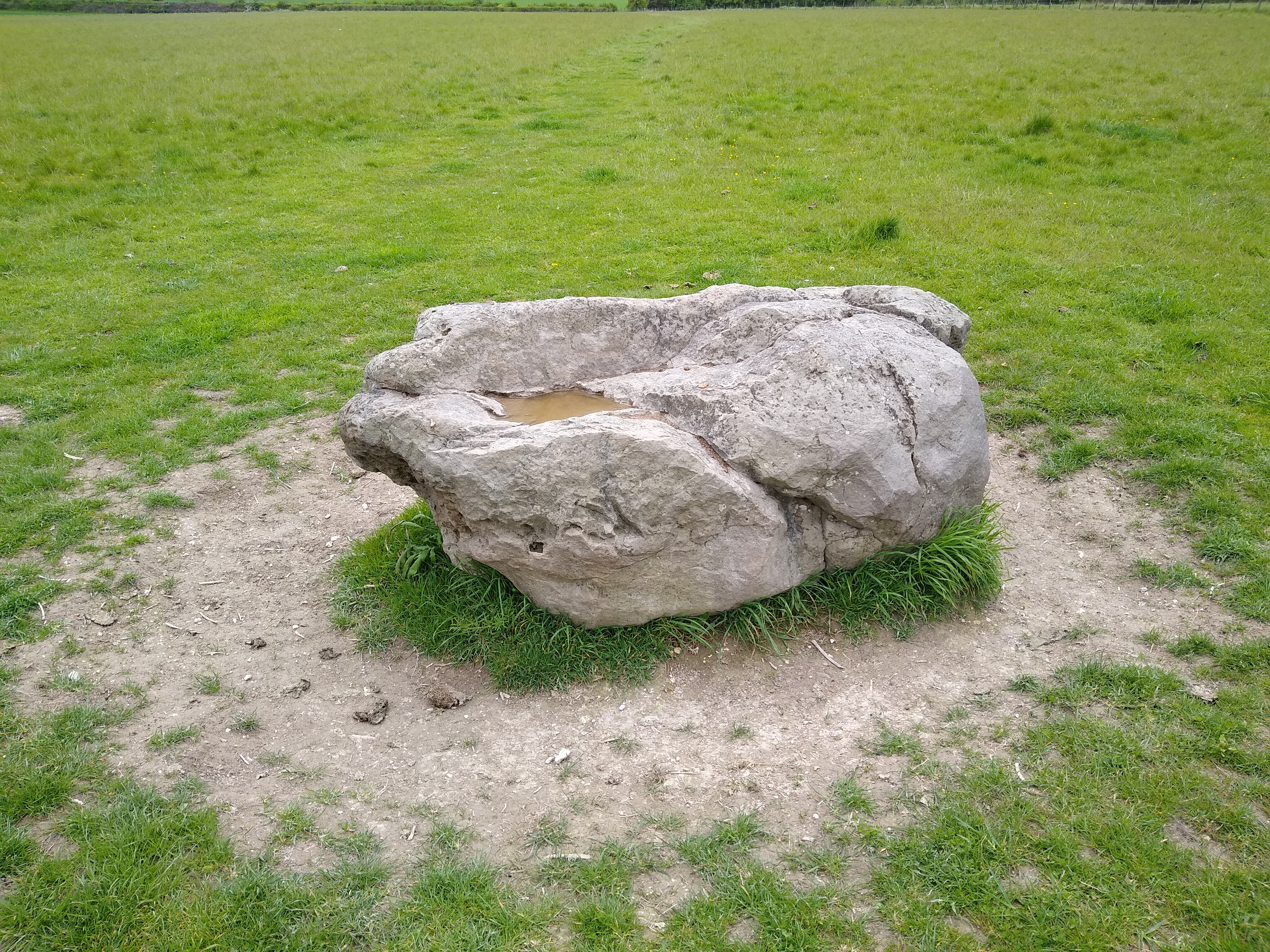

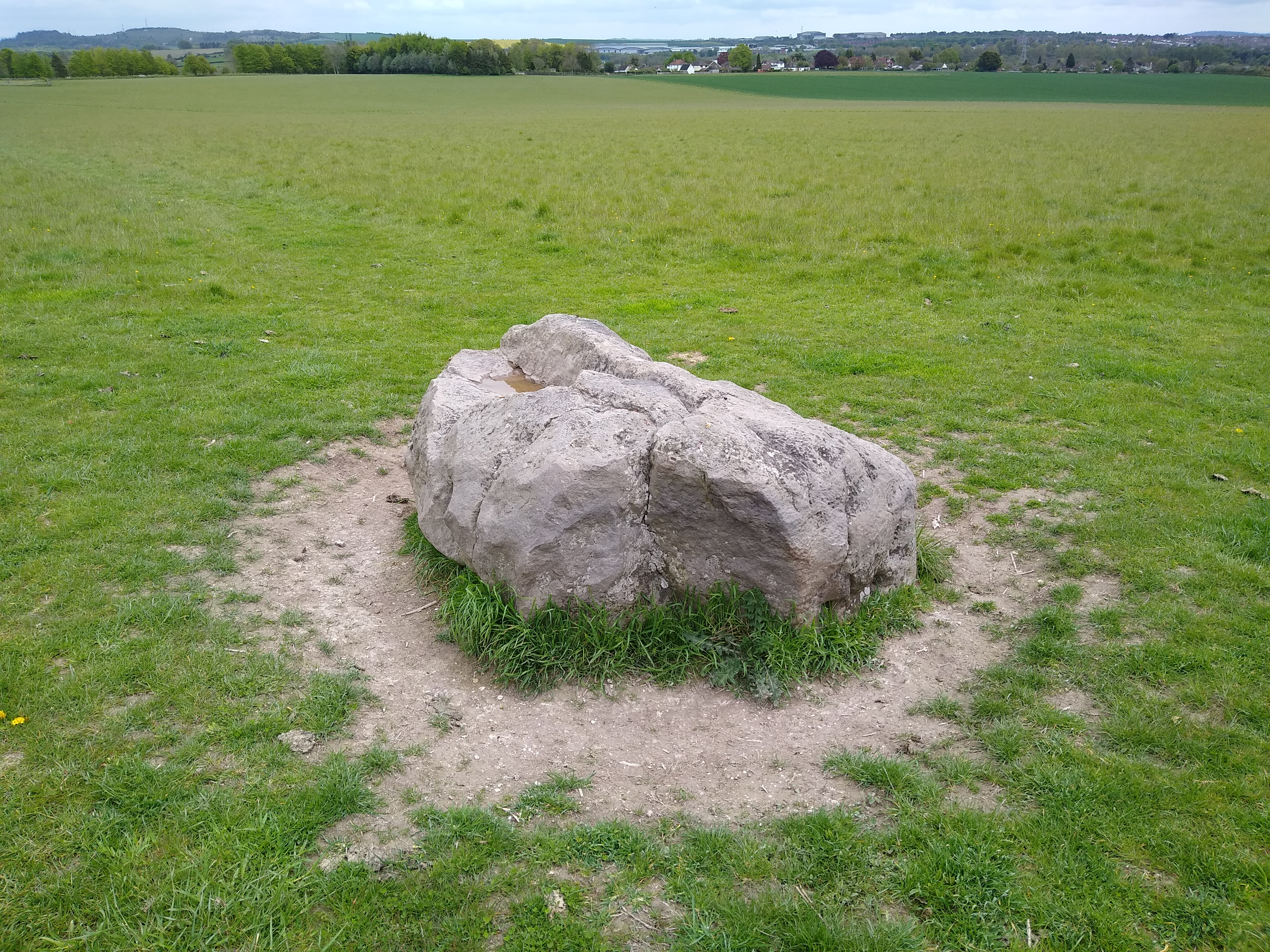

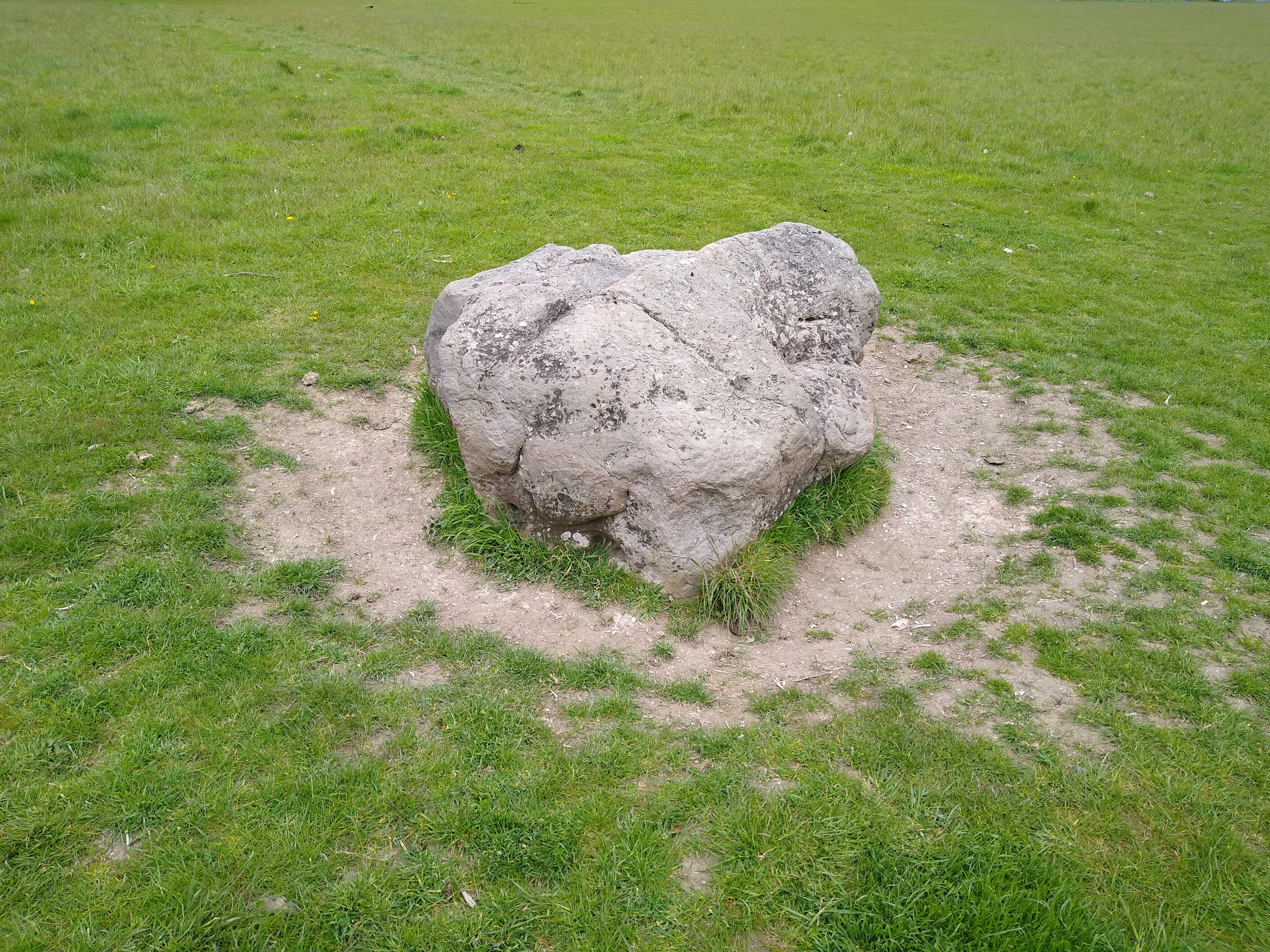

== See also ==
- Gowk stane
