= Endrick Water =

River in Scotland

Coordinates: 56.07162°N 4.52590°W

Endrick Water River Endrick
- The Endrick river in winter
- Etymology: Scottish Gaelic: Eunarag

Location
- Country: Scotland
- District: Stirling

Physical characteristics
- Source: Burnfoot Burn and Backside Burn
  - location: Gargunnock Hills / Fintry Hills
- Mouth: Loch Lomond
  - location: Eastern end of Loch Lomond
- Basin size: Large part of western Stirling District

The Endrick Water or River Endrick (Scottish Gaelic: Eunarag) is a river which flows into the eastern end of Loch Lomond, Scotland.

Its drainage basin covers a large part of the west of Stirling District. The Burnfoot Burn rising on the southern slopes of the Gargunnock Hills and the Backside Burn rising on the eastern slopes of the Fintry Hills combine to form the Endrick Water which flows south before turning sharply westwards at the foot of the western dam of Carron Valley Reservoir. The river flows through Strathendrick, the village of Fintry and past Balfron and Drymen before entering Loch Lomond.
