= Fintry =

Coordinates: 56.053350°N 4.224040°W

Fintry: Scottish Gaelic: Fionn Treabh
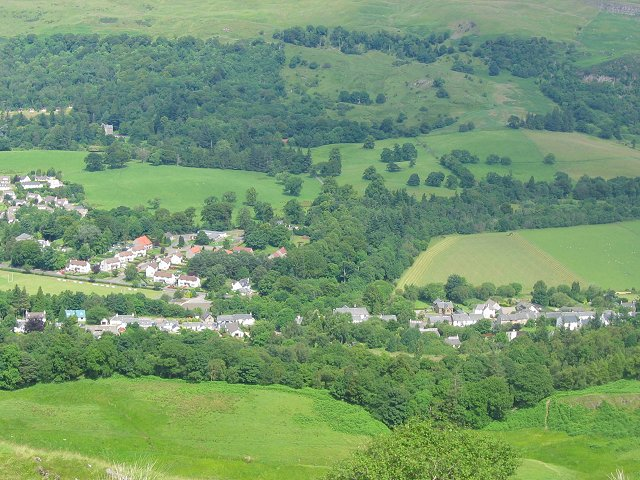
- Looking down on Fintry from the north slopes of the Campsie Fells

- Location within the Stirling council area
- Population: 763
- OS grid reference: NS615865
- Civil parish: Fintry
- Council area: Stirling
- Country: Scotland
- Sovereign state: United Kingdom
- Post town: GLASGOW
- Postcode district: G63
- Dialling code: 01360
- Police: Scotland
- Fire: Scottish
- Ambulance: Scottish
- UK Parliament: Stirling and Strathallan
- Scottish Parliament: Stirling

Fintry is a small riverside village in Stirlingshire, central Scotland. It is located 16 miles (26 km) south-west of Stirling and around 19 miles (31 km) north of Glasgow.

== Landscape ==
The village of Fintry sits by the Endrick Water in a strath between the Campsie Fells and the Fintry Hills.

The village of Fintry is overlooked by Stronend, the 511-metre (1,677 ft) culmination of the Fintry Hills, which forms the western end of a range of hills which stretch east to the city of Stirling, Scotland.

The Loup of Fintry, is a notable 94 ft waterfall on the Endrick Water around 2 miles to the east of a Fintry. This is best seen after prolonged rain or snowfall. The total height of the waterfalls is 28.6 m (94 ft). Lowp or "Loup" means leap in Scots.

=== Preservation ===
==== Local Landscape Area (LLA) ====
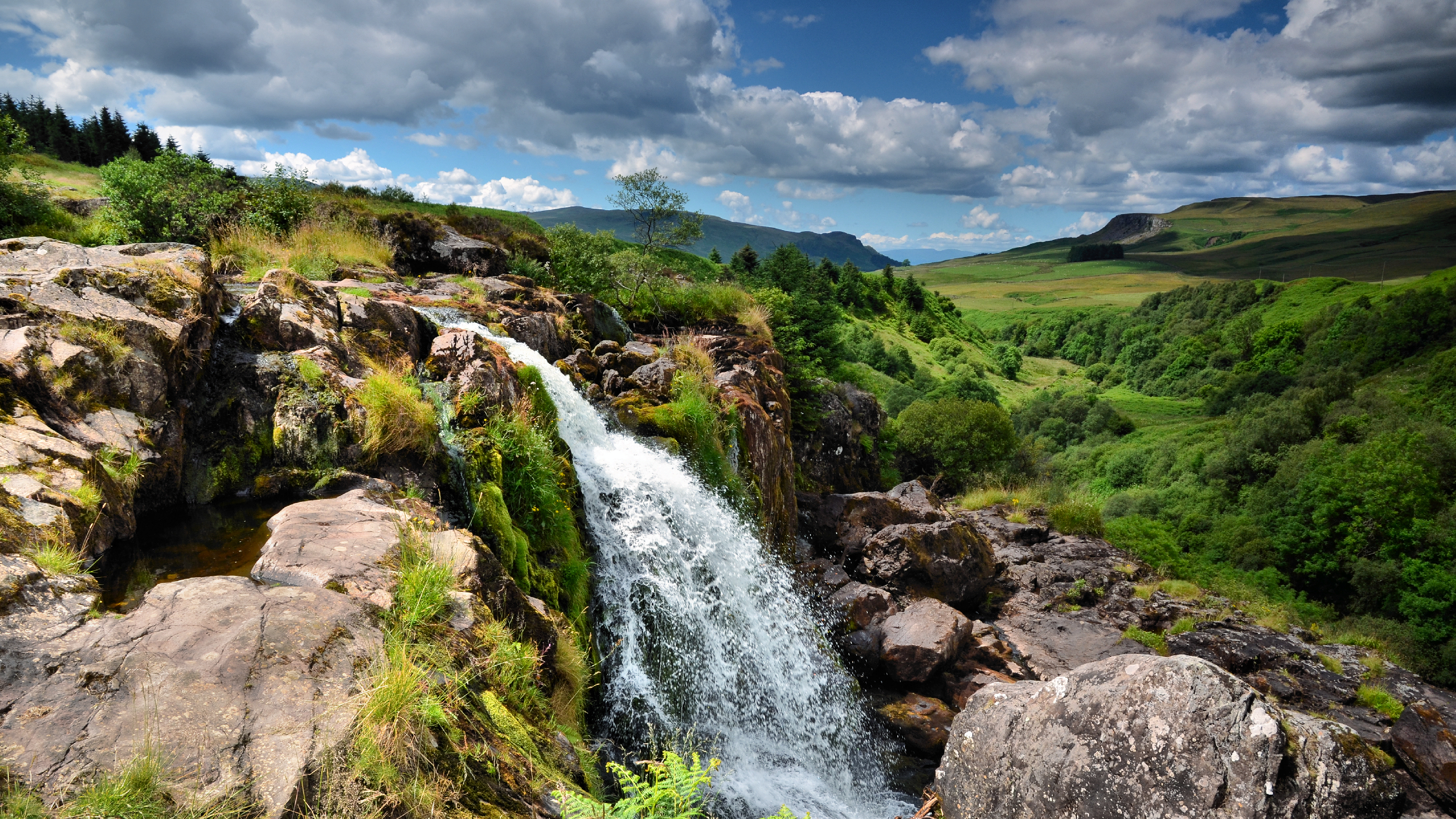
The Loup of Fintry

The name Fintry is said to have derived from the Old Gaelic for "Fair Land" and is designated as a Local Landscape Area (LLA) (formally called a Special Landscape Area or Area of Great Landscape Value). This designation is with the aim of protecting the village and its surroundings outstanding natural environment.

==== Conservation Area ====
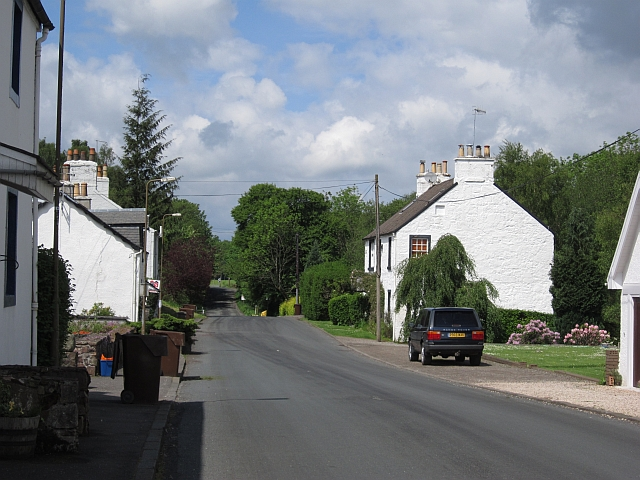
Main Street, Fintry

Stirling Council has classified Fintry as a Conservation Area in order to preserve the settlement's particular historical shape and character.

Fintry Conservation Area is centred on its long Main Street, which is located on the river's south bank, across the Fintry Bridge from the historic Culcreuch Mill site. 150 of the 700 strong population living within the Fintry Conservation area.

== Facilities ==
=== Schools ===
The village has a local primary school, which was opened on 22 September 1961 by the Rt. Hon. Thomas Johnston. There is also an attached council run nursery, Fintry Nursery. Both the nursery and primary school serve Fintry and the surrounding rural district.

==== Fintry Nursery ====
The Nursery has two rooms and a kitchen, it recently underwent major refurbishment and was awarded a five star inspection in February 2023.

==== Fintry Primary School ====
Fintry Primary School is at the foot of Dunmore Hill, and has five classrooms, one of which is adapted into a library, with and an assembly hall. The school has grounds, incl. a school garden, an all-weather pitch, a trim trail and a woodland area. There is a "School Taxi" provided by the council to pick up and drop off children from the surrounding rural areas.

==== Balfron High School ====
Fintry is within the catchment area of Balfron High School, for which a school bus is provided.

=== Sport & Strathendrick RFC ===
The village has a Sports Club, which includes a 4-rink indoor bowling hall, squash club and gym.

The rugby pitches adjacent are home to Strathendrick Rugby Football Club, a rugby union side founded in 1975 and based in the village. Strathendrick RFC 1st XV play in West Division One and has a tradition of touring; and it has toured in Kansas (1992) and Toronto (2001).

They have an active mini and midi set up which works closely with local schools, including Fintry Primary School.

=== Fintry Public Hall ===
Fintry resident Sir Walter Menzies MP built the Menzies Hall to celebrate the coming of age of his son, James, in 1907. On 9 October 1908, Fintry Public Hall opened to the public. The building still operates under its current name ‘Menzies Hall’ in dedication to the man who gave it to the village.

Menzies Hall is a community building run by local residents for the benefits of the village and surrounding area. The hall is still used as a village hall and hosts events, and clubs, including Fintry Amateur Dramatic Society.

=== Fintry Kirk ===
The Village of Fintry is served by Fintry Kirk, a Church of Scotland Parish in the Presbytery of Stirling. The kirk is located to the East of the village, in "Old Fintry". The parish minister for Fintry is shared with Balfron with the Manse located there.

=== Public Transport ===
There is no regular bus or train service in Fintry. Public transport is provided by the Stirling Council Demand-responsive transport (DRT) "Taxi" Service.

== Economy ==
=== The Fintry Development Trust ===
The Fintry Development Trust (FDT) was created in 2003 by residents who wanted to "do something with renewable energy" in their community. When plans to establish a wind farm in the area were announced, they created Fintry Renewable Energy Enterprise (FREE) in 2003 and secured the addition of one community-owned wind turbine.

In efforts to move the village towards zero-carbon and zero-waste, FDT has established several energy-saving activities, including a car-sharing programme, as well as a farming initiative and a communal orchard.

FDT is doing energy surveys on properties around the village and insulating every home surveyed. To improve energy efficiency, the Trust installed a biomass heating system at Fintry Sports Club and a new heating system at Menzies Village Hall.

FDT prioritises sustainable development, local jobs, youth housing, and skill development; sharing wind turbine benefits throughout the town and compensating village residents who are unable to benefit directly.

=== Businesses ===
==== Fintry Inn ====
Fintry has been served by the village pub the Fintry Inn for over 250 years, barring a period of closure during the pandemic. It is owned and operated by a local family and home to their micro-brewery, Mosaik Brewing.

The Inn is said to be haunted by a non-threatening female ghost.

==== Fintry Sports Club ====
As well as being home to Strathendrick RFC, Fintry's Sports Club has a restaurant/cafe and bar, a shop (for essentials) and a gym with sauna.

==== Knockraich Farm ====
Home to The Courtyard Cafe, Katy Rodgers Artisan Dairy and The Tin Shed wedding venue, Knockraich Farm has been owned and managed by the Rodgers family since 1955.

== History ==
=== Neolithic and Bronze Age ===
There is evidence of people living in the area as early at the Bronze Age, up to 4,000 years ago.

- Todholes Cairn, Fintry Hills - double ring cairn of the late Neolithic/earlier Bronze Age (3500 to 4500 years old)
- Machar/Waterhead Stones - pair of Neolithic standing stones

=== "Old Fintry" ===
"Old" Fintry was formed around the Church area or Clachan of Fintry in the early 13th century.

==== Culcreuch Castle ====
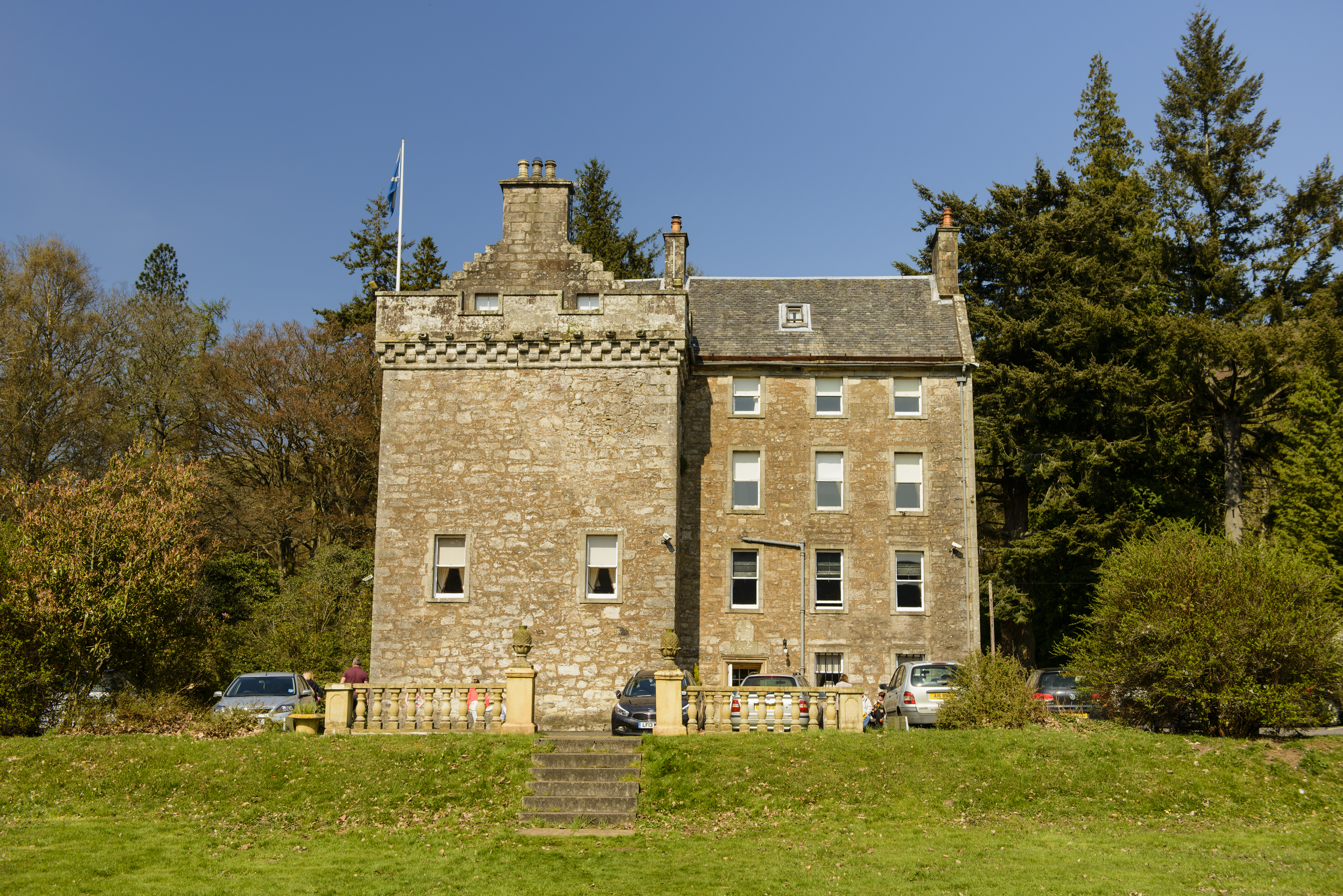
Culcreuch Castle

Culcreuch Castle was also built in Fintry around this period, in 1296, and was the historic seat of the chiefs of the Galbraith clan until 1624 when a series of scandals lost them their status under Scots Law.

From 1699, the Barons of Culcreuch resided there. The castle was converted into a hotel in the 1980s and operated as such until early 2020, bringing its 700-year lifespan to an end. Until 2020, it was Central Scotland's longest-inhabited castle.

Culcreuch is a three-story, attic-topped rectangular tower house with a parapet and slate roof. The Napier family built the north and east expansions to the old tower about 1721, which match the original tower in style. The Castle is accessible by path from the village and is a popular local walk.

=== "New Fintry" ===
The small industrial ‘new town’ of Fintry (or "Newton of Fintry") developed north-west of the original clachan following the establishment of the Culcreuch cotton spinning mill by Peter Spiers in 1795. The mill and two small settlements were recorded in the mid-eighteenth century. the village had retained examples of former mill workers’ housing alongside traditional buildings from the later eighteenth and turn of the nineteenth centuries.

== Notable people ==
- Sir Daniel Macnee (artist) (1806–1882)
- Sir Walter Menzies MP (politician) (1856–1913)
- Tom Johnston MP (politician) (1881–1965)
- Victor Carin (actor) (1933–1981)
- Eric McCredie (musician) (1945–2007)
- Right Hon Julian Smith MP (politician) (born 1971)
- Stewart Campbell (sportsman) (born 1972)

== Democracy ==
The 2022 census results report that Fintry and the surrounding rural area had a population of 763.

=== Local Government ===
The village is within the Forth and Endrick ward of Stirling Council. The Stirling Council Council Ward (Forth and Endrick) representatives are: Rosemary Fraser (SNP), Gerry McGarvey (Labour), Paul Henke (Conservative)

=== Scottish Parliament ===
The Scottish Parliament elects representatives under an additional member system (AMS). Fintry is in the Stirling Scottish Parliamentary Constituency, and the Mid Scotland and Fife Scottish Parliamentary region.

This means that Fintry has one Stirling MSP, Evelyn Tweed MSP (SNP), and seven Mid Scotland and Fife Scottish regional list MSPs.

=== House of Commons of the United Kingdom ===
Fintry is also in the Stirling constituency for House of Commons of the United Kingdom, where they are represented by Alyn Smith MP
