= List of United Kingdom locations: In-Ir =

The United Kingdom

This is part of the list of United Kingdom locations: a gazetteer of place names in the United Kingdom showing each place's locality and geographical coordinates.

== In ==
Location	Locality	Coordinates (links to map & photo sources)	OS grid reference
Ince	Cheshire	53.27°N 02.82°W	SJ4576
Ince Blundell	Sefton	53.51°N 03.02°W	SD3203
Ince-in-Makerfield	Wigan	53.53°N 02.63°W	SD5804
Inchbare	Angus	56.77°N 02.65°W	NO6065
Inchberry	Moray	57.58°N 03.15°W	NJ3155
Inchbraoch	(Rossie Island) Angus	56.69°N 02.49°W	NO7056
Inchbrook	Gloucestershire	51.69°N 02.23°W	SO8400
Inchcailloch	Stirling	56.07°N 04.55°W	NS412902
Inchconnachan	Argyll and Bute	56.08°N 04.61°W	NS376914
Inchcruin	Stirling	56.08°N 04.59°W	NS387909
Incheril	Highland	57.60°N 05.29°W	NH0362
Inchfad	Stirling	56.08°N 04.56°W	NS403909
Inchinnan	Renfrewshire	55.89°N 04.44°W	NS4769
Inch Kenneth	Argyll and Bute	56.43°N 06.16°W	NM436351
Inchlonaig	Argyll and Bute	56.10°N 04.60°W	NS384933
Inchmarnoch	Aberdeenshire	57.05°N 02.95°W	NO4296
Inchmarnock	Argyll and Bute	55.78°N 05.15°W	NS021592
Inchmoan	Argyll and Bute	56.07°N 04.60°W	NS379904
Inchmore	Highland	57.47°N 04.38°W	NH5745
Inchmurrin	West Dunbartonshire	56.05°N 04.59°W	NS384872
Inchnadamph	Highland	58.14°N 04.97°W	NC2521
Inchree	Highland	56.71°N 05.23°W	NN0263
Inchs	Cornwall	50.43°N 04.83°W	SW9963
Inchtavannach	Argyll and Bute	56.08°N 04.62°W	NS367910
Inchture	Perth and Kinross	56.43°N 03.16°W	NO2828
Inchyra	Perth and Kinross	56.36°N 03.32°W	NO1820
Indian Queens	Cornwall	50.39°N 04.94°W	SW9159
Ingatestone	Essex	51.66°N 00.37°E	TQ6499
Ingbirchworth	Barnsley	53.55°N 01.66°W	SE2206
Ingerthorpe	North Yorkshire	54.08°N 01.55°W	SE2966
Ingestre	Staffordshire	52.81°N 02.03°W	SJ9824
Ingham	Suffolk	52.29°N 00.71°E	TL8570
Ingham	Lincolnshire	53.33°N 00.58°W	SK9483
Ingham	Norfolk	52.77°N 01.54°E	TG3926
Ingham Corner	Norfolk	52.78°N 01.54°E	TG3927
Ingleborough	Norfolk	52.71°N 00.17°E	TF4715
Ingleby	Derbyshire	52.83°N 01.49°W	SK3427
Ingleby Arncliffe	North Yorkshire	54.39°N 01.32°W	NZ4400
Ingleby Cross	North Yorkshire	54.39°N 01.30°W	NZ4500
Ingleby Greenhow	North Yorkshire	54.44°N 01.10°W	NZ5806
Ingleigh Green	Devon	50.84°N 03.99°W	SS6007
Inglemire	City of Kingston upon Hull	53.76°N 00.37°W	TA0731
Inglesbatch	Bath and North East Somerset	51.34°N 02.43°W	ST7061
Inglesham	Swindon	51.68°N 01.71°W	SU2098
Ingleton	Durham	54.57°N 01.73°W	NZ1720
Ingleton	North Yorkshire	54.15°N 02.47°W	SD6973
Inglewhite	Lancashire	53.84°N 02.70°W	SD5439
Ingliston	Angus	56.62°N 02.96°W	NO4148
Ingmanthorpe	Derbyshire	53.26°N 01.50°W	SK3373
Ingmanthorpe	North Yorkshire	53.94°N 01.37°W	SE4150
Ingoe	Northumberland	55.06°N 01.95°W	NZ0374
Ingol	Lancashire	53.77°N 02.74°W	SD5131
Ingoldisthorpe	Norfolk	52.85°N 00.49°E	TF6832
Ingoldmells	Lincolnshire	53.18°N 00.33°E	TF5668
Ingoldsby	Lincolnshire	52.85°N 00.50°W	TF0130
Ingon	Warwickshire	52.21°N 01.69°W	SP2157
Ingram	Northumberland	55.43°N 01.98°W	NU0116
Ingrams Green	West Sussex	50.97°N 00.80°W	SU8420
Ingrave	Essex	51.60°N 00.33°E	TQ6292
Ingrow	Bradford	53.84°N 01.92°W	SE0539
Ings	Cumbria	54.37°N 02.86°W	SD4498
Ingst	South Gloucestershire	51.58°N 02.60°W	ST5887
Ingthorpe	Rutland	52.66°N 00.53°W	SK9908
Ingworth	Norfolk	52.81°N 01.24°E	TG1929
Inhurst	Hampshire	51.34°N 01.18°W	SU5761
Inishail	Argyll and Bute	56.36°N 05.07°W	NN102239
Inkberrow	Worcestershire	52.21°N 01.98°W	SP0157
Inkerman	Durham	54.74°N 01.83°W	NZ1139
Inkersall	Derbyshire	53.24°N 01.37°W	SK4272
Inkersall Green	Derbyshire	53.24°N 01.37°W	SK4272
Inkford	Worcestershire	52.36°N 01.89°W	SP0774
Inkpen	Berkshire	51.37°N 01.46°W	SU3764
Inkpen Common	Berkshire	51.36°N 01.45°W	SU3863
Inlands	West Sussex	50.84°N 00.90°W	SU7706
Inmarsh	Wiltshire	51.33°N 02.08°W	ST9460
Innellan	Argyll and Bute	55.87°N 04.97°W	NS1469
Inner Farne	Northumberland	55.61°N 01.66°W	NU214361
Inner Hope	Devon	50.23°N 03.86°W	SX6739
Innerleithen	Scottish Borders	55.61°N 03.06°W	NT3336
Innerleven	Fife	56.18°N 03.01°W	NO3700
Innertown	Orkney Islands	58.95°N 03.32°W	HY2408
Innerwick	East Lothian	55.95°N 02.45°W	NT7274
Innerwick	Perth and Kinross	56.59°N 04.31°W	NN5847
Innis Chonain	Argyll and Bute	56.37°N 05.07°W	NN1025
Innis Mhòr	Highland	57.85°N 03.94°W	NH847861
Innox Hill	Somerset	51.23°N 02.33°W	ST7749
Innsworth	Gloucestershire	51.88°N 02.20°W	SO8621
Insch	Aberdeenshire	57.34°N 02.61°W	NJ6328
Insh	Highland	57.08°N 03.96°W	NH8101
Inshegra	Highland	58.44°N 05.01°W	NC2455
Insh Island	Argyll and Bute	56.30°N 05.66°W	NM734190
Inskip	Lancashire	53.82°N 02.82°W	SD4637
Inskip Moss Side	Lancashire	53.84°N 02.83°W	SD4539
Instoneville	Doncaster	53.60°N 01.17°W	SE5512
Instow	Devon	51.04°N 04.18°W	SS4730
Insworke	Cornwall	50.34°N 04.22°W	SX4252
Intack	Lancashire	53.74°N 02.45°W	SD7028
Intake	Leeds	53.81°N 01.66°W	SE2235
Intake	Sheffield	53.35°N 01.43°W	SK3884
Intake	Doncaster	53.52°N 01.11°W	SE5903
Interfield	Worcestershire	52.13°N 02.33°W	SO7749
Intwood	Norfolk	52.58°N 01.23°E	TG1904
Inver	Highland	57.81°N 03.92°W	NH8682
Inver	Aberdeenshire	57.02°N 03.27°W	NO2393
Inver	Perth and Kinross	56.56°N 03.61°W	NO0142
Inverailort	Highland	56.86°N 05.67°W	NM7681
Inveralivaig	Highland	57.39°N 06.19°W	NG4842
Inveralligin	Highland	57.55°N 05.61°W	NG8457
Inverallochy	Aberdeenshire	57.67°N 01.93°W	NK0465
Inveraray	Argyll and Bute	56.22°N 05.08°W	NN0908
Inverarish	Highland	57.34°N 06.07°W	NG5535
Inverarity	Angus	56.58°N 02.89°W	NO4544
Inverarnan	Argyll and Bute	56.32°N 04.73°W	NN3118
Inverbeg	Argyll and Bute	56.13°N 04.67°W	NS3497
Inverbervie	Aberdeenshire	56.83°N 02.29°W	NO8272
Inverboyndie	Aberdeenshire	57.66°N 02.57°W	NJ6664
Invercassley	Highland	57.97°N 04.58°W	NC4701
Inverchaolain	Argyll and Bute	55.93°N 05.05°W	NS0975
Inverchoran	Highland	57.50°N 04.90°W	NH2650
Inverdruie	Highland	57.17°N 03.82°W	NH9011
Invereddrie	Perth and Kinross	56.79°N 03.42°W	NO1368
Inveresk	East Lothian	55.93°N 03.04°W	NT3572
Inveresragan	Argyll and Bute	56.46°N 05.28°W	NM9835
Inverey	Aberdeenshire	56.98°N 03.51°W	NO0889
Inverfarigaig	Highland	57.27°N 04.45°W	NH5223
Invergarry	Highland	57.06°N 04.80°W	NH3001
Invergelder	Aberdeenshire	57.02°N 03.27°W	NO2393
Invergeldie	Perth and Kinross	56.41°N 04.04°W	NN7427
Invergordon	Highland	57.68°N 04.16°W	NH7168
Invergowrie	Perth and Kinross	56.45°N 03.07°W	NO3430
Inverguseran	Highland	57.09°N 05.73°W	NG7407
Inverie	Highland	57.03°N 05.69°W	NG7600
Inverinan	Argyll and Bute	56.30°N 05.25°W	NM9917
Inverinate	Highland	57.23°N 05.44°W	NG9221
Inverkeilor	Angus	56.63°N 02.55°W	NO6649
Inverkeithing	Fife	56.02°N 03.39°W	NT1382
Inverkeithny	Aberdeenshire	57.51°N 02.63°W	NJ6247
Inverkip	Inverclyde	55.90°N 04.88°W	NS2072
Inverkirkaig	Highland	58.11°N 05.27°W	NC0719
Inverlair	Highland	56.87°N 04.74°W	NN3379
Inverleith	City of Edinburgh	55.96°N 03.21°W	NT2475
Inverlochy	Highland	56.81°N 05.09°W	NN1174
Inverlussa	Argyll and Bute	56.00°N 05.78°W	NR6486
Invermoidart	Highland	56.79°N 05.83°W	NM6673
Invermoriston	Highland	57.20°N 04.63°W	NH4116
Invernaver	Highland	58.50°N 04.23°W	NC7060
Inverneill	Argyll and Bute	55.97°N 05.46°W	NR8481
Inverness	Highland	57.47°N 04.23°W	NH6645
Invernettie	Aberdeenshire	57.48°N 01.80°W	NK1244
Invernoaden	Argyll and Bute	56.12°N 05.02°W	NS1297
Inverroy	Highland	56.88°N 04.87°W	NN2581
Inversanda	Highland	56.67°N 05.38°W	NM9359
Invershiel	Highland	57.21°N 05.43°W	NG9319
Invershin	Highland	57.93°N 04.41°W	NH5796
Invershore	Highland	58.28°N 03.29°W	ND2434
Inverugie	Aberdeenshire	57.52°N 01.83°W	NK1048
Inveruglas	Argyll and Bute	56.24°N 04.72°W	NN3109
Inveruglass	Highland	57.07°N 03.98°W	NH8000
Inverurie	Aberdeenshire	57.27°N 02.38°W	NJ7721
Invervar	Perth and Kinross	56.60°N 04.18°W	NN6648
Inverythan	Aberdeenshire	57.45°N 02.41°W	NJ7541
Inwardleigh	Devon	50.77°N 04.04°W	SX5699
Inwood	Shropshire	52.55°N 02.79°W	SO4696
Inworth	Essex	51.82°N 00.71°E	TL8717

== Io ==
Location	Locality	Coordinates (links to map & photo sources)	OS grid reference
Iochdar	Western Isles	57.39°N 07.37°W	NF7746
Iona	Argyll and Bute	56.32°N 06.41°W	NM275239

== Ip ==
Location	Locality	Coordinates (links to map & photo sources)	OS grid reference
Iping	West Sussex	51.00°N 00.78°W	SU8523
Ipplepen	Devon	50.48°N 03.65°W	SX8366
Ipsden	Oxfordshire	51.56°N 01.09°W	SU6385
Ipsley	Worcestershire	52.29°N 01.91°W	SP0666
Ipstones	Staffordshire	53.03°N 01.97°W	SK0249
Ipswich	Suffolk	52.05°N 01.14°E	TM1644

== Ir ==
Location	Locality	Coordinates (links to map & photo sources)	OS grid reference
Irby	Wirral	53.34°N 03.12°W	SJ2584
Irby in the Marsh	Lincolnshire	53.14°N 00.19°E	TF4763
Irby upon Humber	North East Lincolnshire	53.51°N 00.20°W	TA1904
Irchester	Northamptonshire	52.27°N 00.65°W	SP9265
Ireby	Cumbria	54.73°N 03.19°W	NY2338
Ireby	Lancashire	54.17°N 02.53°W	SD6575
Ireland	Bedfordshire	52.05°N 00.35°W	TL1341
Ireland	Shetland Islands	59.98°N 01.33°W	HU3722
Ireland	Orkney Islands	58.96°N 03.21°W	HY3009
Ireland	Wiltshire	51.28°N 02.23°W	ST8454
Ireland's Cross	Shropshire	52.96°N 02.40°W	SJ7341
Ireland Wood	Leeds	53.83°N 01.60°W	SE2638
Ireleth	Cumbria	54.18°N 03.19°W	SD2277
Ireshopeburn	Durham	54.73°N 02.21°W	NY8638
Ireton Wood	Derbyshire	53.01°N 01.58°W	SK2847
Irlam	Salford	53.44°N 02.42°W	SJ7294
Irlams o' th' Height	Salford	53.49°N 02.31°W	SD7900
Irnham	Lincolnshire	52.82°N 00.48°W	TF0226
Iron Acton	South Gloucestershire	51.54°N 02.47°W	ST6783
Iron Bridge	Cambridgeshire	52.56°N 00.18°E	TL4898
Ironbridge	Shropshire	52.62°N 02.48°W	SJ6703
Iron Cross	Warwickshire	52.16°N 01.92°W	SP0552
Irongray	Dumfries and Galloway	55.09°N 03.70°W	NX9179
Irons Bottom	Surrey	51.19°N 00.21°W	TQ2546
Ironville	Derbyshire	53.05°N 01.35°W	SK4351
Irstead Street	Norfolk	52.71°N 01.47°E	TG3519
Irthington	Cumbria	54.94°N 02.79°W	NY4961
Irthlingborough	Northamptonshire	52.32°N 00.62°W	SP9470
Irton	North Yorkshire	54.24°N 00.45°W	TA0184
Irvine	North Ayrshire	55.61°N 04.66°W	NS3239
Irwell Vale	Lancashire	53.67°N 02.31°W	SD7920
