= Markington =

Village in North Yorkshire, England

Coordinates: 54°04′48″N 1°33′43″W

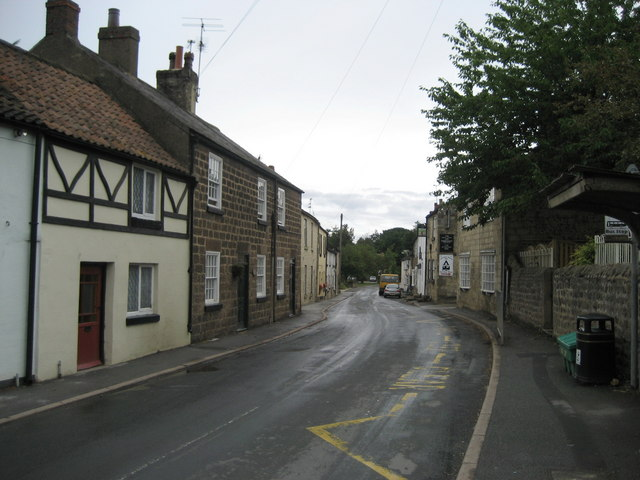
Street in Markington

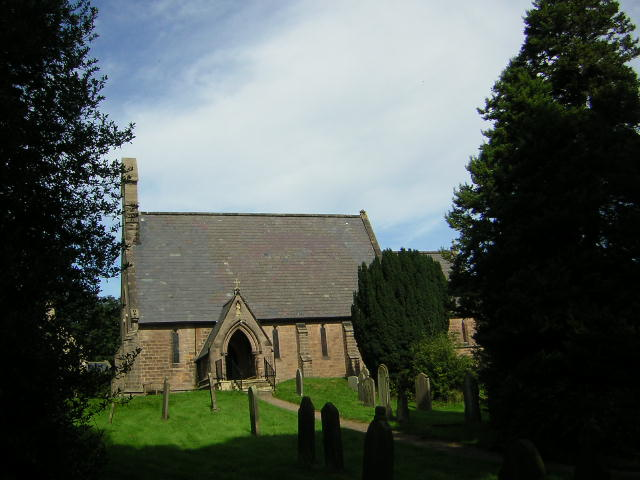
St Michael's Church, Markington

Markington is a village in the English county of North Yorkshire. The population of the civil parish (including Markenfield Hall) taken at the 2011 census was 629. Nearby settlements include the city of Ripon, the town of Harrogate, the village of South Stainley and the hamlet of Ingerthorpe. The A61 is nearby. Markington has a school, post office, village hall, cricket and football pitch, a church, a pub and a camp site.

The place name was first recorded in about 1030 as Mercinga tun. The name is probably from Old English mercinga "of the boundary people" and tūn "settlement or farmstead", so meaning "settlement of the boundary people". Alternatively, it might be derived from the name of the nearby settlement of Markenfield, so meaning "farmstead of the people of Markenfield".

Markington is the principal settlement in the civil parish of Markington with Wallerthwaite. Wallerthwaite is a deserted medieval village just south of Markington. Markington with Wallerthwaite was historically a township in the parish of Ripon, and became a separate civil parish in 1866. It absorbed the civil parish of Ingerthorpe in 1937. Until 1974 it was part of the West Riding of Yorkshire, and from 1974 to 2023 it was part of the Borough of Harrogate. It is now administered by the unitary North Yorkshire Council.

The 17th-century Markington Hall was owned by William Wilberforce, and is a grade II listed building. Low Mill lies in its grounds.

== See also ==
- Listed buildings in Markington with Wallerthwaite
