= Intake (disambiguation) =

An intake is an opening or structure through which air/fluid is admitted to a space or machine. Intake may also refer to:

== Places ==
=== United Kingdom ===
- Intake, Doncaster, a suburb of Doncaster, South Yorkshire, England
- Intake, Sheffield, a residential area in Richmond, Sheffield, England
- Intake, County Londonderry, an archeological site in County Londonderry, Northern Ireland
- Intake, Leeds, a place in West Yorkshire, England: see List of United Kingdom locations: In-Ir#In

=== United States ===
- Intake, Montana, an unincorporated community in Dawson County, Montana
- Intake Creek, a creek near the former Weston, Washington

== Other ==
- Intake (land), a parcel of land reclaimed from a moor
- Intake (video game), a 2013 game by Cipher Prime

== See also ==
- Intack, a location in Lancashire, England
