= Listed buildings in South Stainley with Cayton =

South Stainley with Cayton is a civil parish in the county of North Yorkshire, England. It contains 15 listed buildings that are recorded in the National Heritage List for England. All the listed buildings are designated at Grade II, the lowest of the three grades, which is applied to "buildings of national importance and special interest". The parish contains the village of South Stainley, the site of the deserted medieval village of High Cayton, and the surrounding countryside. The listed buildings include houses and associated structures, farmhouses and farm buildings, a church and two mileposts.

== Buildings ==
Name and location	Photograph	Date	Notes
Eastern Farmhouse, High Cayton; 54.06401°N 1.56417°W		1607	The house is rendered, and has a purple slate roof with stone coped gables. There are two storeys and three bays, a lower two-bay extension on the right, and a rear outshut. On the front is a doorway, and the windows are sashes, some horizontally sliding.
Cayton Hall; 54.06253°N 1.54406°W	—	17th century	The oldest part of the house is the rear wing, with the main block dating from about 1770. The house is in magnesian limestone with gritstone at the rear, a sill band, an eaves band, and a hipped slate roof. There are two storeys, the main block has fronts of three and one bay, and the rear wing has fronts of three and two bays. On the main block, the central doorway has attached Tuscan columns, a fanlight and an open pediment. On the ground floor are Venetian windows with double keystones, and the upper floor has sash windows in architraves. The rear bay contains mullioned and mullioned and transomed windows and a bay window, and there is a Venetian stair window.
Manor Farmhouse; 54.06391°N 1.534896°W		17th century	The farmhouse was extended in the 19th century. The earlier part incorporates material from a 16th-century house, including a timber framed core. It is in gritstone and rubble, and has a pantile roof with gable coping and a bulbous kneeler on the right, and has two storeys and three bays. On the front is a doorway and a mullioned window, and the other windows are horizontally sliding sashes. The later block has two storeys and fronts of two bays, and gable coping with a shaped kneeler on the left. The doorway has a fanlight, and the windows are sashes. At the rear is an undercroft roofed with tiles.
Stables, cart sheds and byres, High Cayton; 54.06440°N 1.56432°W		Late 17th century	The farm buildings, later used for other purposes, are in pink-grey gritstone, the stables having a timber framed core, and the pantile roofs have eaves courses of stone slate. They form a row of three buildings consisting of a two-storey three-bay stable, a two-bay cart shed with open sides, and a byre with about five bays.
Gate piers, Stainley Hall Farmhouse; 54.05976°N 1.52438°W		Late 17th to early 18th century	The gate piers are in stone, and about 4 metres (13 ft) in height. They are octagonal, and each pier has a cornice, and a ball finial on a bulbous base.
Stables and barn, Cayton Hall; 54.06212°N 1.54488°W		1726	The stables are the earlier part, and the barn is dated 1750. They are in gritstone and cobble, with stone slate roofs. The stable range has two storeys and two bays, with extension of two bays to the right and five bays to the left. On the upper floor is a gabled dormer with a clock face, and a wooden bellcote with a weathervane. The barn has a central segmental arch with quoined jambs, and the date on the top stones.
Sundial shaft, Cayton Hall; 54.06237°N 1.54406°W	—	18th century	The sundial shaft in the garden to the front of the house is in gritstone. It is about 1.2 metres (3 ft 11 in) in height, and is in the form of a short Tuscan column on a square base.
Laundry and game larder, Cayton Hall; 54.06260°N 1.54444°W	—	Mid- to late 18th century	The building is in gritstone and cobble, with quoins, a coved eaves band, and a hipped stone slate roof. There are two storeys and two bays. On the ground floor are paired doors with quoined jambs, and the windows are mullioned, one with eight lights.
Cart shed and pigeoncote, Cayton Hall; 54.06165°N 1.54496°W	—	c. 1770	The cart shed with a pigeoncote above is in stone, with quoins, and a pyramidal stone slate roof with shaped kneelers. There are two storeys, a square plan, and one bay. On the east side are paired round-arched openings with raised imposts and keystones, and the south side has a Venetian window with an architrave, imposts and a keystone. The ground floor is open, and the interior of the upper floor is lined with brick nesting holes.
Barn and wheel house, High Cayton; 54.06433°N 1.56518°W		Early to mid-19th century	The threshing barn and wheel-house are in pink-grey gritstone, with quoins, and a pantile roof with eaves courses of stone slate. The barn has seven bays, and the wheel-house to the rear is polygonal. The barn has a segmental-arched cart entrance, doorways, windows and pitching doors, and the wheel-house has a hipped roof, and rectangular openings under the eaves.
St Wilfrid's Church; 54.06364°N 1.53276°W		1845	The church is in magnesian limestone with a blue slate roof, and is in Early English style. It consists of a nave, a south porch, and a chancel with a north vestry. At the west end is a buttress ending in a corbel supporting a bellcote with four shouldered arches, a spire and a weathervane. The windows are lancets, and at the east end are three stepped lancets with a hood mould.
Milepost at corner of Green Lane; 54.05170°N 1.54019°W		Mid-19th century	The milepost is on the east side of the A61 road. It is in cast iron, and has a triangular plan and a sloping top. On the top is the distance to Leeds, the sides have pointing hands, the left side with the distance to Harrogate, and the right side to Ripon.
Milepost north of Church Lane; 54.06568°N 1.53816°W		Mid-19th century	The milepost is on the east side of the A61 road. It is in cast iron, and has a triangular plan and a sloping top. On the top is the distance to Leeds, the sides have pointing hands, the left side with the distance to Harrogate, and the right side to Ripon.
Stainley Hall Farmhouse; 54.06043°N 1.52393°W		19th century (probable)	The house is in magnesian limestone, and has a purple slate roof with gable copings. There are two storeys and three bays. The doorway has a plain surround, and the windows are mullioned with hood moulds.
Western Farmhouse, High Cayton; 54.06413°N 1.56468°W		Mid-19th century	The house is in gritstone, and has purple slate roofs with gable copings. There are two storeys and three bays, and a recessed narrower bay to the left with a hipped roof. On the font is a doorway with a fanlight, and at the rear is a porch. The windows are sashes, and at the rear is a round-headed stair window.
