= South Stainley =

Village in North Yorkshire, England

Coordinates: 54°03′53″N 1°32′08″W

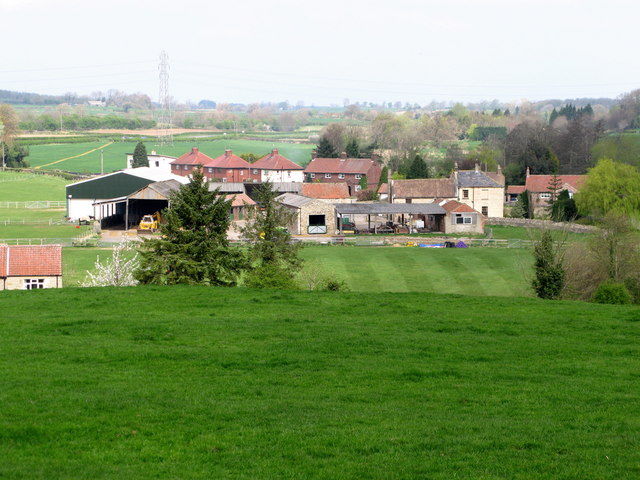
- View from the south

- Location within North Yorkshire
- Population: 172 (2011 Census)
- OS grid reference: SE306632
- Civil parish: South Stainley with Cayton
- Unitary authority: North Yorkshire
- Ceremonial county: North Yorkshire
- Region: Yorkshire and the Humber
- Country: England
- Sovereign state: United Kingdom
- Post town: HARROGATE
- Postcode district: HG3
- Dialling code: 01423
- Police: North Yorkshire
- Fire: North Yorkshire
- Ambulance: Yorkshire

South Stainley is a small village in the county of North Yorkshire, England. Nearby settlements include the city of Ripon, the town of Harrogate and the village of Markington. South Stainley is on the A61 road. South Stainley has a pub and a place of worship, St Wilfrid's Church, which is a grade II listed structure.

The village is mentioned in Domesday as having 30 plough lands and a meadow covering 8 acres (3.2 ha). The name has been recorded variously as Southe Stanley, South Stonley and Kyrke Staynelay. The name derives from the Old Norse of Nyrran Stanlege, which means "stony forest or glade clearing". The presence of the prefix Kirk is due to it having a church as opposed to North Stainley. Historically, the village was in the wapentake of Claro, part of the West Riding of Yorkshire, some 5 miles (8 km) south of Ripon. From 1974 to 2023 it was part of the Borough of Harrogate, it is now administered by the unitary North Yorkshire Council.

The village sits on Stainley Beck, a tributary of the River Ure, and the land is mostly magnesian limestone with a small outcrop of millstone grit around the village.

The population of the parish was 174 at the 2001 census, falling slightly to 172 at the 2011 census. In 2015, North Yorkshire County Council estimated the population to be 180.

The village is the principal settlement in the civil parish of South Stainley with Cayton. Cayton, 1-mile (1.6 km) west of South Stainley, is the site of a deserted medieval village and a grange established by Fountains Abbey in the Middle Ages.

== See also ==
- Listed buildings in South Stainley with Cayton
