= St Michael's Church, Markington =

Church in Markington, North Yorkshire, England

Coordinates: 54°04′51″N 1°33′50″W

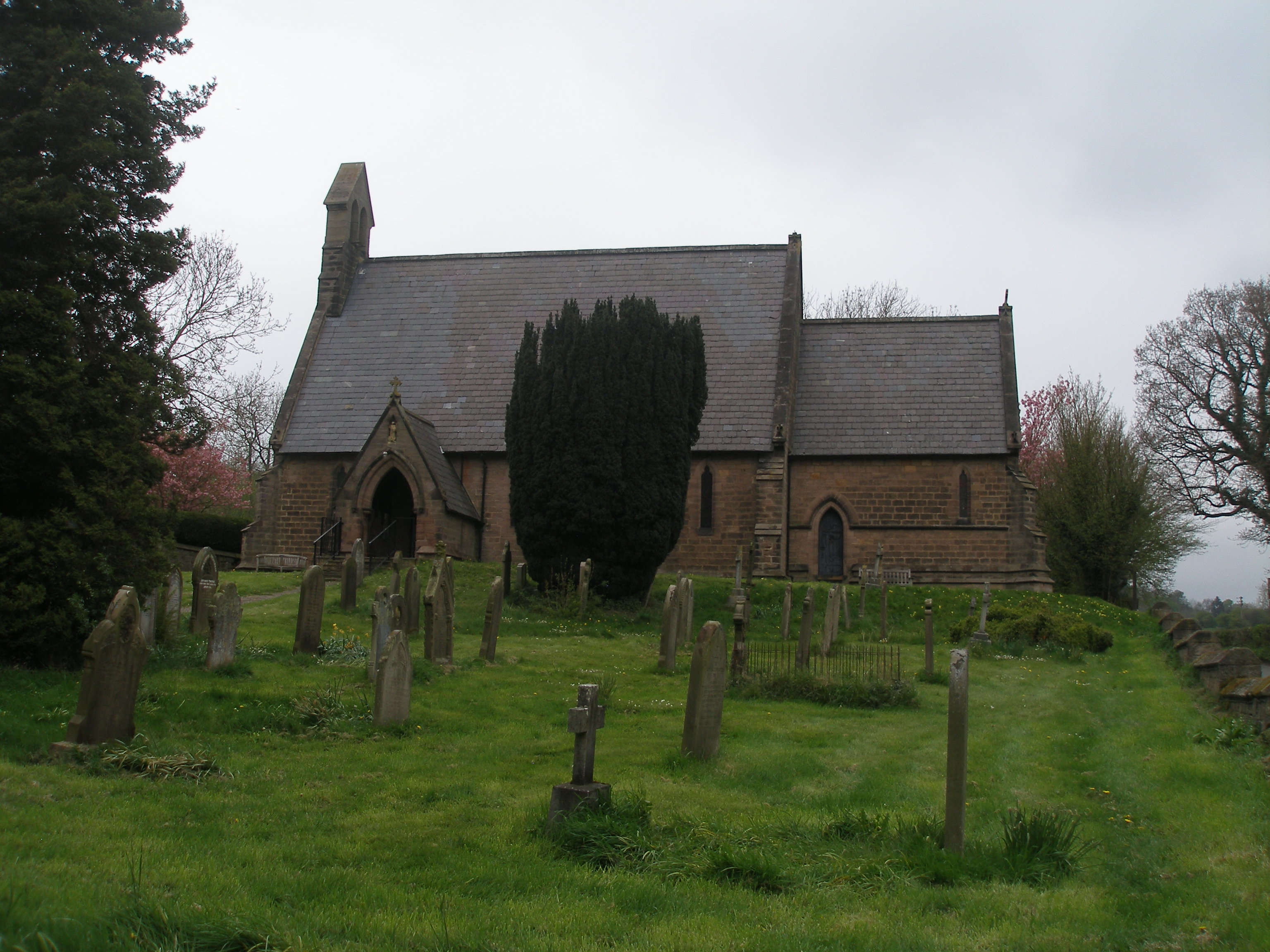
The church, in 2012

St Michael's Church is the parish church of Markington, a village in North Yorkshire, in England.

The church was commissioned by the family of William Wilberforce, and was designed by Adolphus Henry Cates in the early Gothic style. Its construction cost about £900, and it was completed in 1845. It could seat 200 worshippers, and was dedicated to Michael the Archangel by the Bishop of Ripon in 1845. The bellcote and west gable were damaged in 1962 but rebuilt in 1968. A fire in 1973 destroyed the vestry and damaged the sanctuary, but the church was restored and rededicated the following year. It was grade II listed in 1986.

The church is built of gritstone and it has a Westmorland slate roof. It consists of a nave, a south porch, and a lower chancel with a north vestry, and on the west gable is a bellcote. The porch has a pointed arch, above which is a hood mould and a statue in a niche.

== See also ==
- Listed buildings in Markington with Wallerthwaite
