= Inverchoran =

Coordinates: 57.51273°N 4.91698°W

Inverchoran: Scottish Gaelic: Inbhir Chòmhrainn
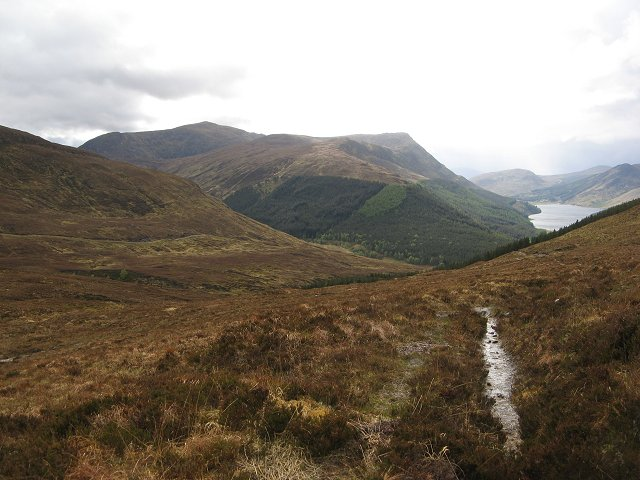
- Pony track Pony track to Glen Orrin, climbing out of Strathconon. This has been partly replaced by a road, visible in the middle distance, that crosses another pass. There are three passes from the long and desolate Glen Orrin that converge on Inverchoran. In the distance is Bac an Eich(849m) above Loch Bennacharain.

- Location within the Ross and Cromarty area
- OS grid reference: NH253507
- Council area: Highland
- Country: Scotland
- Sovereign state: United Kingdom
- Post town: Strathconon
- Postcode district: IV6 7
- Police: Scotland
- Fire: Scottish
- Ambulance: Scottish

Inverchoran (Scottish Gaelic: Inbhir Chòmhrainn) is a small remote hamlet, situated in the upper reaches of Strathconon, in Ross-shire, in the Highland council area of Scotland. It is on the Strathconon Estate, 1 km east of Loch Beannacharain, near where the Allt Gleann Chorainn joins the River Meig.

Inverchoran is 40 km west of the city of Inverness. The village of Achnasheen lies 12 km miles to the northwest, but the only direct route is by a hill path.

== Hill Walking ==
Inverchoran is the starting point for a number of hill walks. These include the Corbetts of Bac an Eich and An Sidhean, and the Graham of Beinn Mheadhoinn.
