= Markington Hall =

Listed building in North Yorkshire, England

Coordinates: 54.0820°N 1.5576°W

General information
- Address: Markington, North Yorkshire, England
- Completed: 17th century
- Renovated: 18th and 20th centuries (altered)

Technical details
- Floor count: 2 / 3
- Designations

Listed Building – Grade II
- Official name: Markington Hall
- Designated: 23 April 1952
- Reference no.: 1190266

Markington Hall is a historic building in Markington, a village in North Yorkshire, in England.

The house was built in the 17th century, and altered in the 18th century. It replaced an earlier property, from which late 15th-century outbuildings survive, part of which has served as a chapel in the past. In the 1920s and 1930s, the house was extended to the rear, and the interior was restored and altered. William Wilberforce owned the house, letting it out to tenants, and it has remained in his family since; in the 21st century using the grounds and outbuildings for holiday lets. It has been Grade II listed since 1952, and the outbuildings are separately Grade II listed.

The house is built of gritstone and limestone, with moulded floor and eaves bands, and a stone slate roof. It has a two-storey three-bay hall range, and three-storey cross-wings with coped gables and shaped kneelers. In the centre is a doorway in an architrave, flanked by mullioned windows, and on the upper floor are sash windows. Elsewhere, most of the windows are mullioned.

The barn and the outbuildings are built of sandstone, limestone and cobble, and have pantile roofs, that of the barn with eaves courses of stone slate. The barn has a timber framed core, five bays and side aisles. On the front are quoins, a large doorway, and blocked slit vents. The chapel range projects at right angles on the left, and contains doorways and paired pointed windows.

Low Mill lies in the grounds of the hall.

== See also ==
- Listed buildings in Markington with Wallerthwaite
