= How Hill Tower =

Listed building in North Yorkshire, England

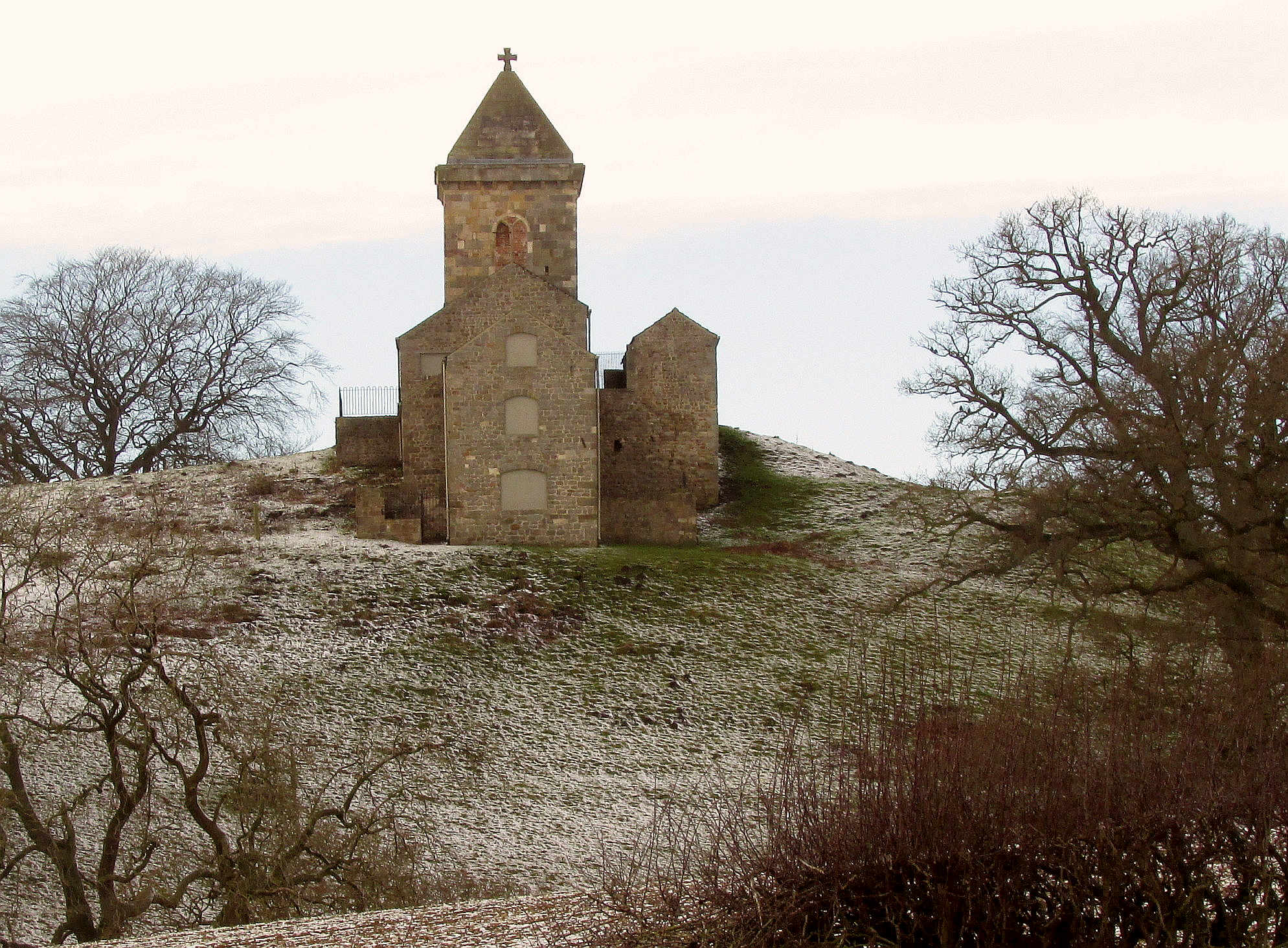
- The tower in 2017

General information
- Location: Studley Royal Park, North Yorkshire, England
- Completed: 1719
- Renovated: Late 18th century (outbuildings); late 20th/early 21st century (year not known)

Design and construction
- Designations

Listed Building – Grade II*
- Official name: How Hill Tower and outbuildings, also called the Chapel of Saint Michael de Monte
- Designated: 13 March 1986
- Reference no.: 1293874

How Hill Tower is a historic 18th century building at Studley Royal Park, a World Heritage Site in North Yorkshire, in England, close to the site of, and/or incorporating the remains of, an earlier medieval chapel.

== History and construction ==
An earlier structure on the site, the Chapel of Saint Michael de Monte, was built for Fountains Abbey in the 13th century. This became a minor medieval pilgrimage site. Visitors to the site could see both York Minster and Ripon Cathedral from its summit. The flooring was made of mosaic tiles, similar to those attributed to a painted pavement dating to between 1236 and 1247. Marmaduke Huby either repaired or rebuilt it between 1494 and 1526. After the Dissolution of the Monasteries it initially served local women, but was abandoned by 1600 and fell into ruin.

In 1719, John Aislabie commissioned a folly tower, as part of his initial design of Studley Royal Park, adjacent to (and possibly re-using stones from) the ruins of the old chapel. Likely designed by Sir John Vanbrugh, the view from the tower extended across the Studley estates, and York could even be seen 26 miles (42 km) away. In 1737, gaming tables were installed, while later in the century, the tower and further chapel ruins adjacent to it were converted into farm outbuildings. In 1810, an estate survey recorded a farmhouse on the site, but by 1822 the description had changed to "How Hill House & Tower". Presumably, the site had lost its significance as a garden building in a designed landscape and was commissioned to a more functional use. Wilfred Owen considered living in the building while it was being let out as two cottages. During the Second World War the Home Guard used it as an observation post. As at 1975 and 1984 its condition was somewhat ruinous, but it appears that restoration of both the tower and attached buildings was carried out between 1984 and 2006 (refer "Gallery"). The tower was Grade II* listed in 1986.

The tower and outbuildings are built of limestone and gritstone with Westmorland slate roofs. The tower has two storeys, a square plan, a projecting stair bay on the south, an inscribed floor band, a modillion eaves band and a pyramidal roof with a cross. On the south front is a round-headed doorway with imposts and a keystone, above which is a decorated plaque, an inscription 'SOL DEO HONOR MH ET GLORIA' (the "MH" believed to reference Marmaduke Huby), and a round-arched window with a chamfered surround. Against the tower are the remains of outbuildings, consisting of a three-storey block with lean-to additions to the east, and a one and two-storey block to the north. A 2017 excavation to inspect the footings of the tower uncovered earlier foundations believed to part of the chancel of the medieval chapel, along with half a dozen mosaic floor tiles, probably from the original chapel's floor.

The remains of the original chapel, believed to have been located immediately west of the tower, were possibly still extant in the nineteenth century but are no longer visible at the surface. The Historic England list entry for the site of the chapel, created separately from that for the tower, notes that stones from the chapel may have been re-used in the tower's construction, and that "excavations in the 19th century uncovered a number of human burials on How Hill assumed to be associated with the chapel".

== Gallery ==
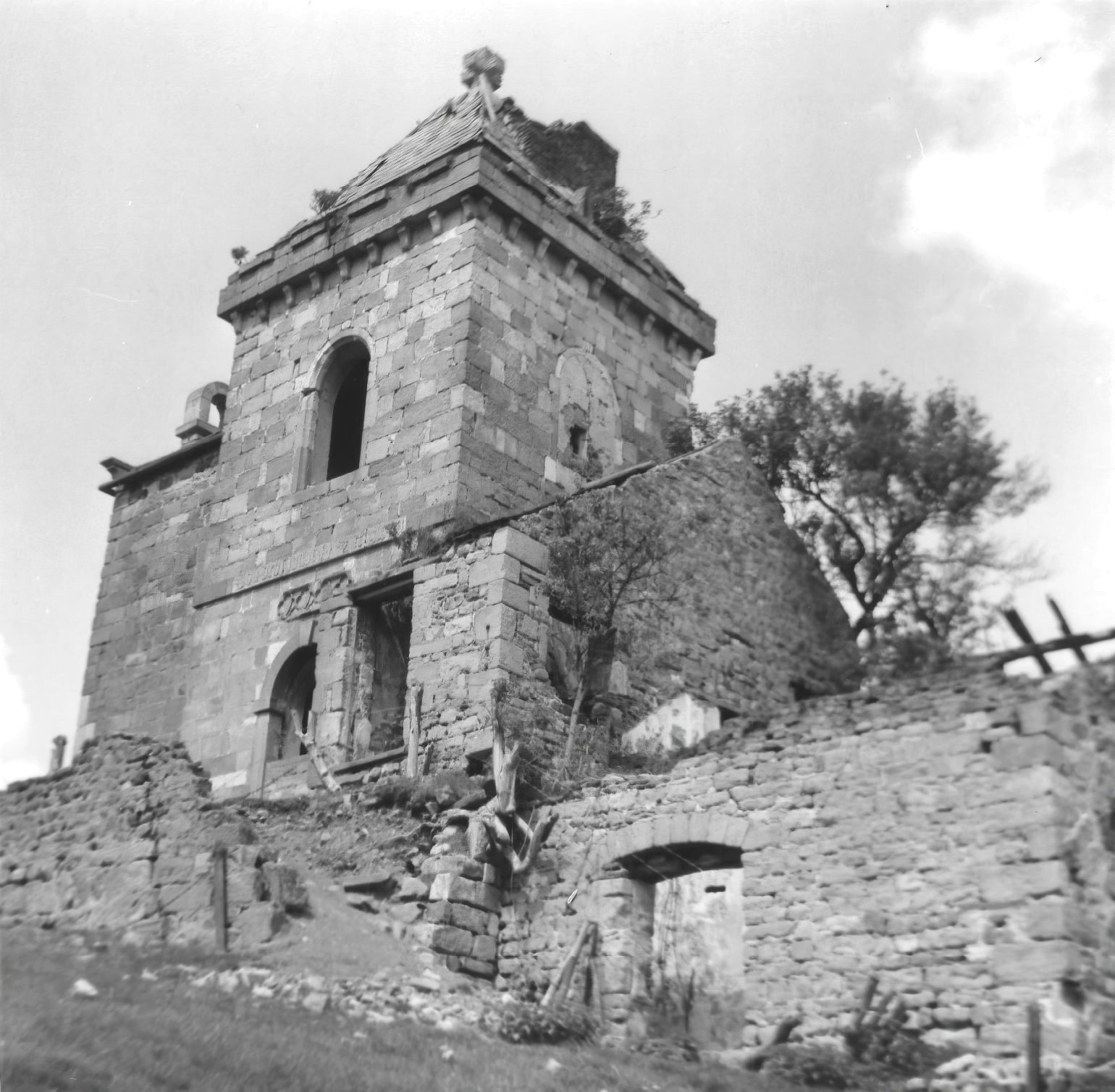
The tower in 1975, in a dilapidated condition

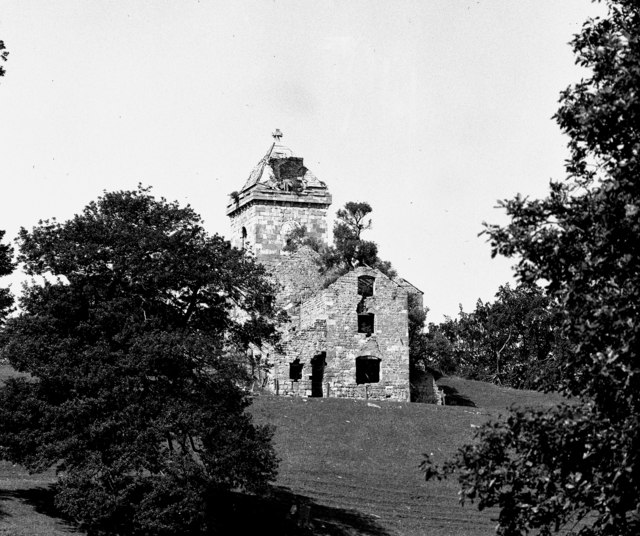
The tower in 1984 (still unrestored)

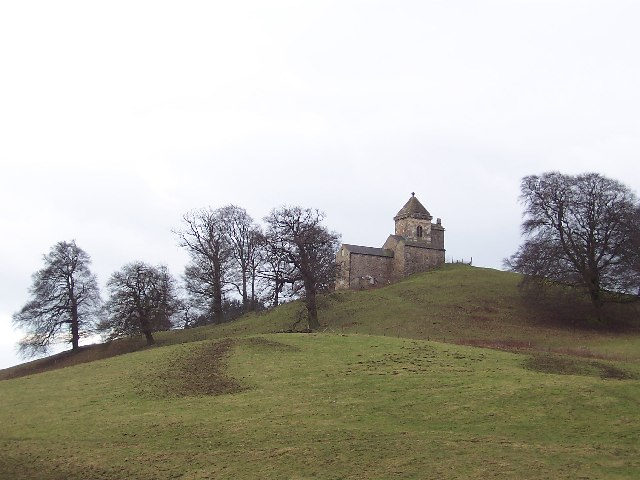
The tower in 2006, with some restoration evident since 1984

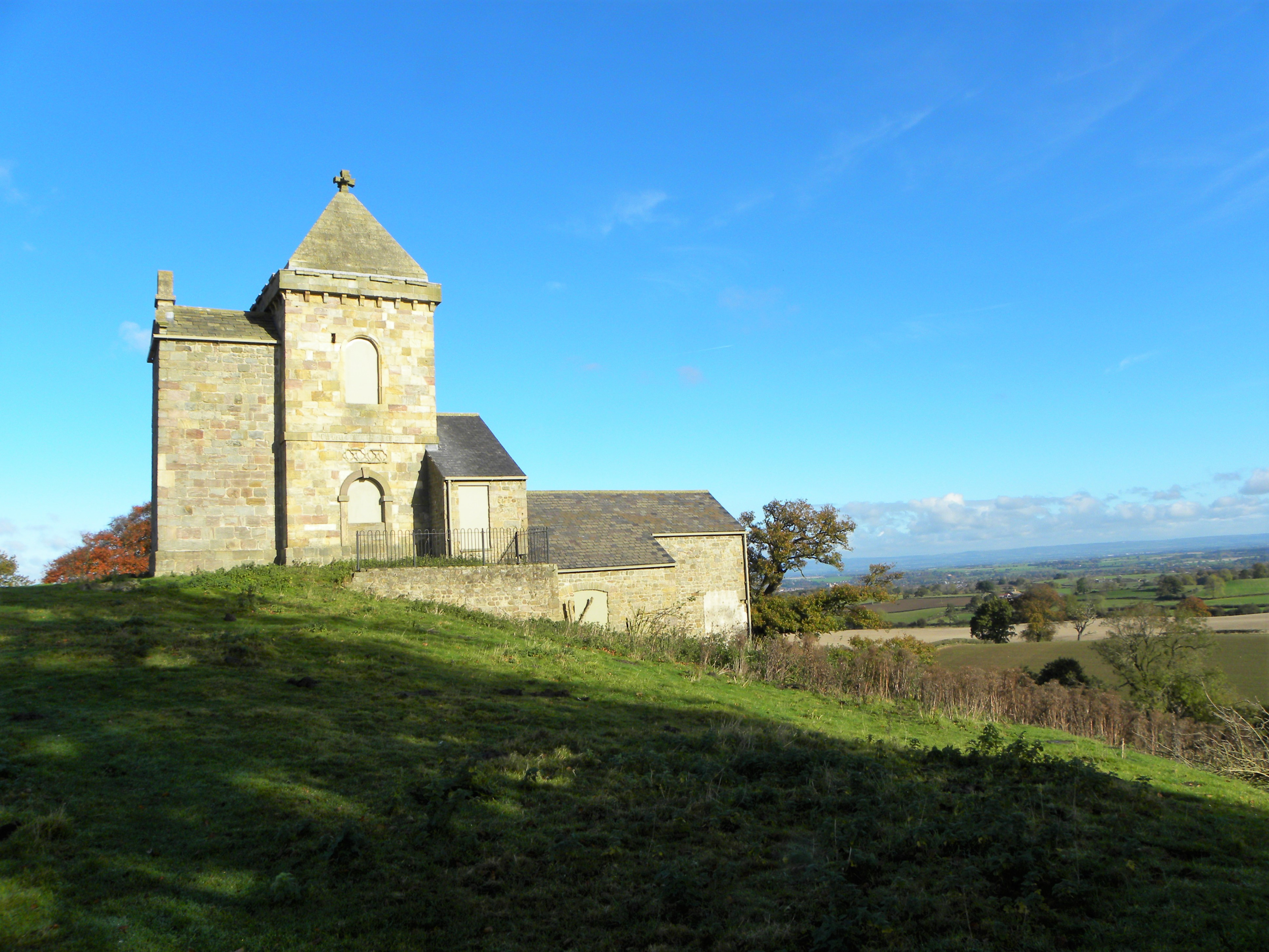
The tower in 2016

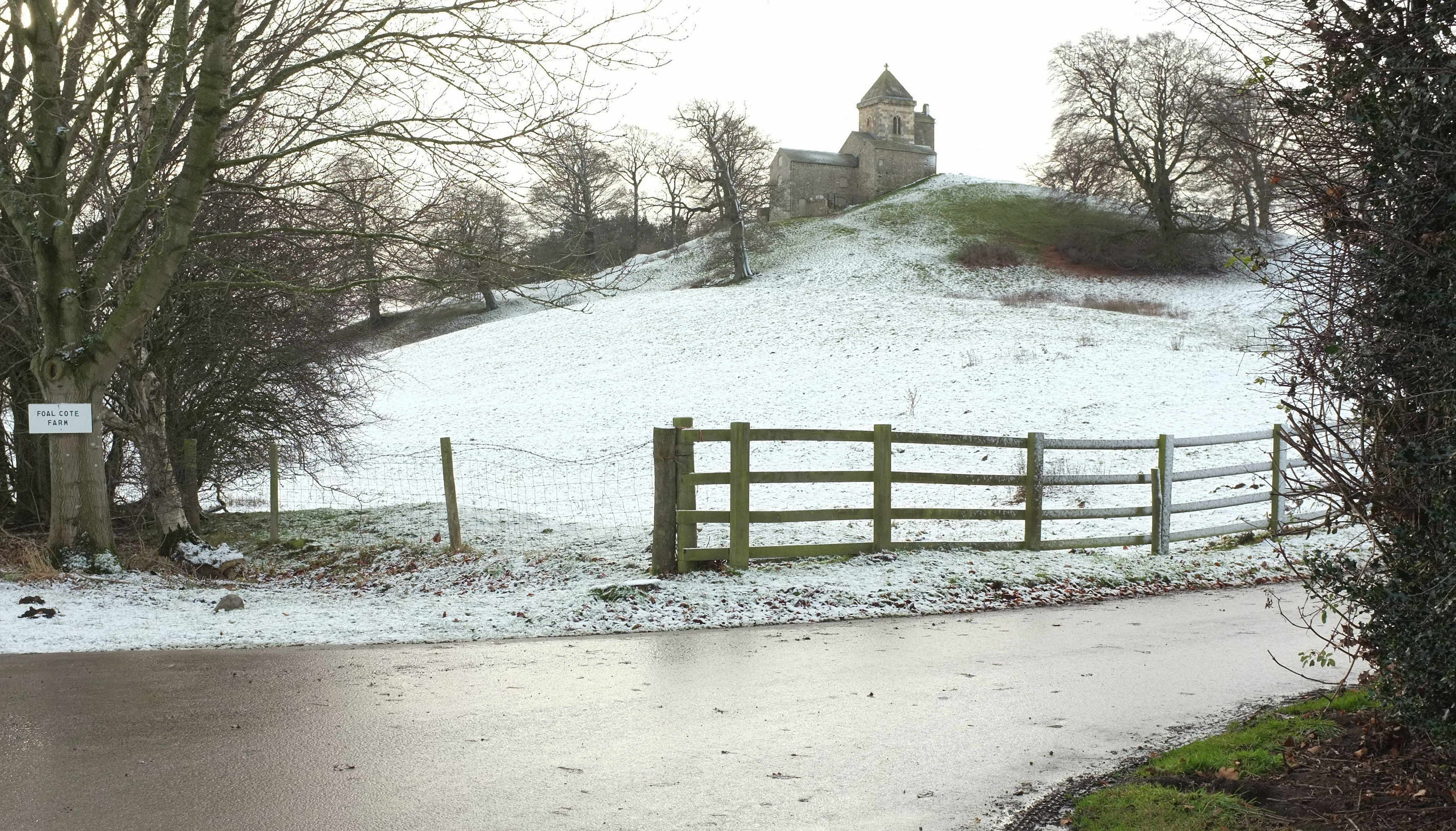
The tower in the landscape, 2017

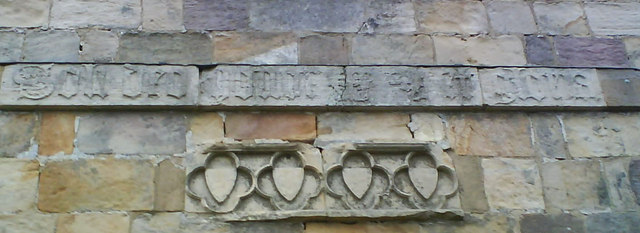
Carving and inscription on south wall exterior, 2007

== See also ==
- Grade II* listed buildings in North Yorkshire (district)
- Listed buildings in Markington with Wallerthwaite
