= St Wilfrid's Church, South Stainley =

Church in South Stainley, North Yorkshire, England

Coordinates: 54°03′49″N 1°31′58″W

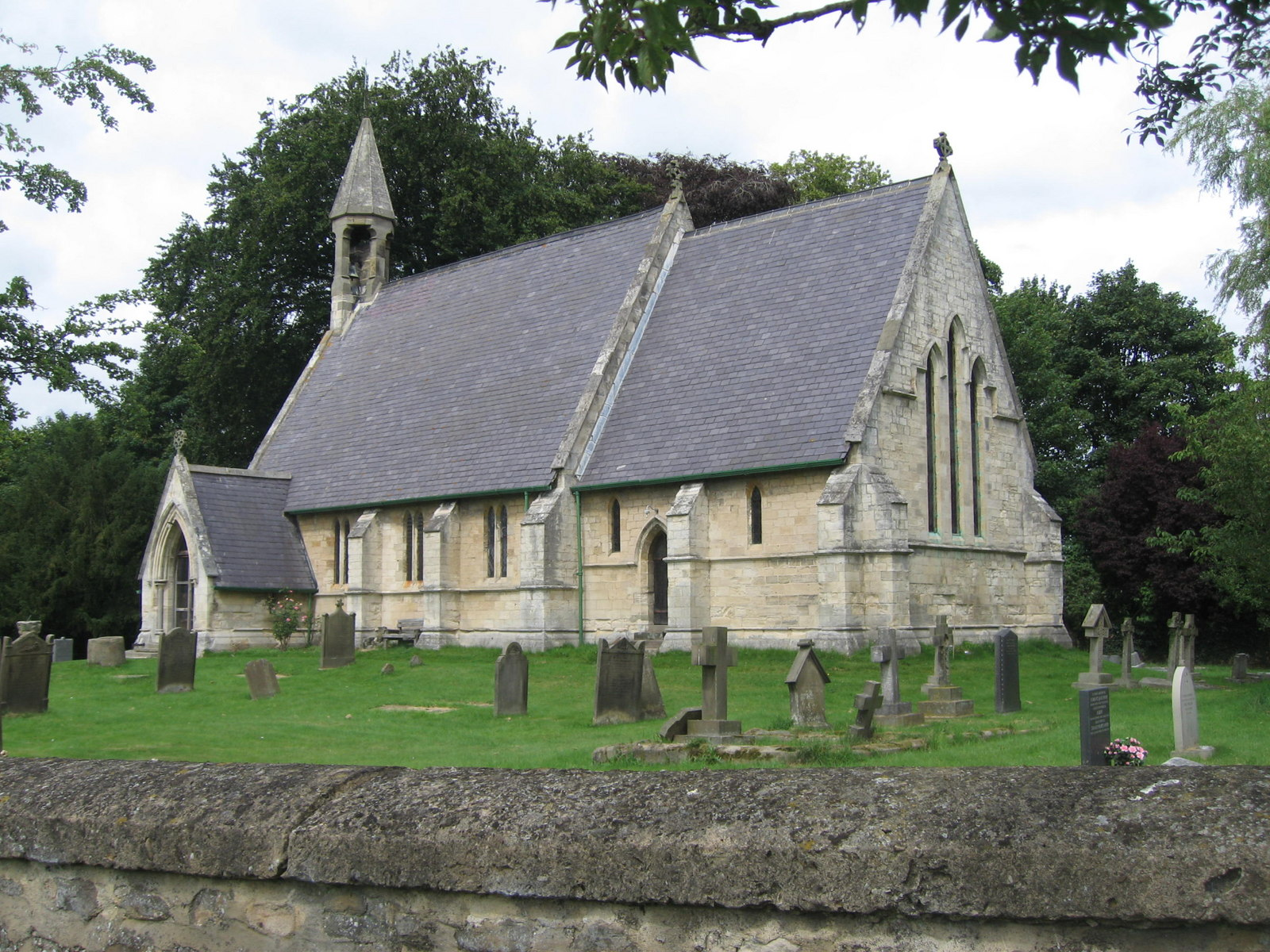
The church, in 2011

St Wilfrid's Church is the parish church of South Stainley, a village in North Yorkshire, in England.

A church was built in South Stainley in the Mediaeval period. In 1829, it was recorded as having a nave and chancel, measuring 70 feet (21 m) by 22 feet (6.7 m) in total, and having formerly had a tower, which had been removed. The church was entirely rebuilt in 1845 at a cost of £800. It is in an Early English style, and was probably designed by John Oates. Although some sources state that some material was reused, the Corpus of Romanesque Sculpture in Britain and Ireland finds no evidence of that. There is a capital which may be 12th century or earlier, and some other carved stones formerly in the porch were later moved to Cayton Hall. A stone tub in the churchyard, sometimes identified as a Mediaeval font, appears to instead be a plain tub of possibly Roman origin. The building was grade II listed in 1987.

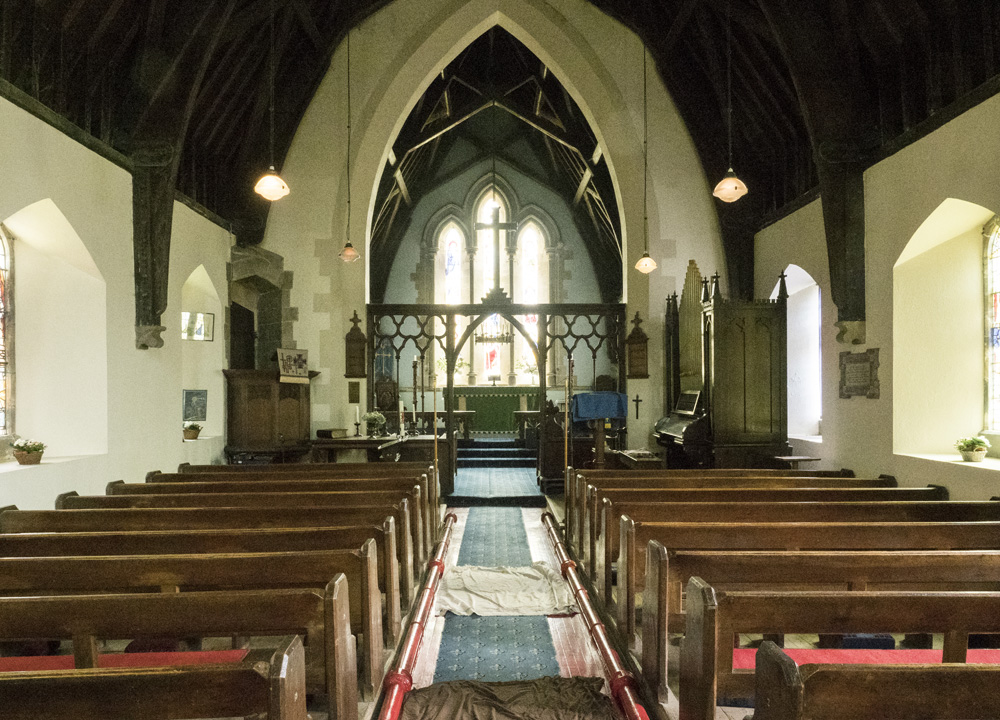
View from the nave into the chancel

The church is built of magnesian limestone with a blue slate roof, and is in Early English style. It consists of a nave, a south porch, and a chancel with a north vestry. At the west end is a buttress ending in a corbel supporting a bellcote with four shouldered arches, a spire and a weathervane. The windows are lancets, and at the east end are three stepped lancets with a hood mould.

== See also ==
- Listed buildings in South Stainley with Cayton
