= Bac an Eich =

849m high mountain in Ross and Cromarty in the Northwest Highlands of Scotland

Coordinates: 57°29′45″N 04°58′06″W

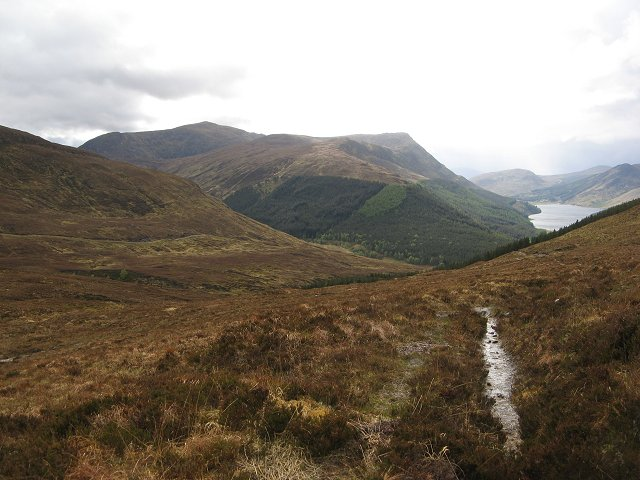
- Bac an Eich from a nearby pony track

Highest point
- Elevation: 849 m (2,785 ft)
- Prominence: 334 m (1,096 ft)
- Listing: Corbett, Marilyn

Geography
- Location: Ross and Cromarty, Scotland
- Parent range: Northwest Highlands
- OS grid: NH222489
- Topo map: OS Landranger 25

Bac an Eich (849 m) is a mountain in Ross and Cromarty in the Northwest Highlands of Scotland.

A very remote mountain, it lies at the head of Strathconan, from where it makes for a fairly straightforward climb with stalkers paths leading up to the summit. The nearest settlement is Inverchoran.
