= Low Mill, Markington =

Listed building in North Yorkshire, England

Coordinates: 54.0824°N 1.5583°W

Low Mill
- Interactive map of the Low Mill area

General information
- Location: Markington, North Yorkshire, England
- Completed: Early 19th century
- Renovated: 1967 (converted)

Technical details
- Floor count: 3

Design and construction
- Designations

Listed Building – Grade II
- Official name: Low Mill approximately 60 metres north of Markington Hall
- Designated: 13 March 1986
- Reference no.: 1149831

Low Mill is a historic building in Markington, a village in North Yorkshire in England.

The watermill was built in the early 19th century by the Wilberforce family, in the grounds of Markington Hall, with a mill race off Markington Beck. It was probably built to replace High Mill, at the other end of the village. It was worked as a corn mill, and from the early 1900s it was run by J. Ross & Sons, who mostly produced animal feed. It was powered by water until 1967, when it was converted into a garage and office. The building was Grade II listed in 1986.

The mill is built of stone and rubble, with sandstone and limestone quoins, paired gutter brackets, and a Westmorland slate roof with gable copings. There are fronts of one and three bays, and on the right return is a two-storey lean-to range. In the left return is a sluice for the mill race. Inside, most the machinery survives, including the breastshot wheel, gearing, cogs, and grindstones.

== See also ==
- Listed buildings in Markington with Wallerthwaite
