= Intake (land) =

Parcel of land "taken in" from a moor

An intake (also spelt intack, and also known as Unthank) is a parcel of land, typically of the order of 12 hectares (30 acres), which has been "taken in" from a moor and brought under cultivation. The term is used almost exclusively in the north of England applying to land on the fringes of the Pennines and other moors. The creation of intakes went on from medieval times up to the 19th century.

Several settlements and farms are called intake, for example Intake Farm at grid reference SE013367 on Haworth Moor.

The Headingly cum Burley Inclosure Award (1834) refers to various intakes when describing the roads and paths set out. for example:

'Oates Road:- One other private occupation of the width and in the direction that it is now branching from Holling Lane between two Intakes called Stoney Close and Harris Close belonging to the Curate of Headingly and leading in a Southwardly direction to and into an allotment on Headingly Moor set out for Edward Oates Esquire.

== See also ==
- Enclosure
