= Inshegra =

Coordinates: 58.44975°N 5.00296°W

Inshegra: Scottish Gaelic: Innis Seigrea
- Location within the Sutherland area
- Population: 34
- OS grid reference: NC248551
- Council area: Highland
- Lieutenancy area: Sutherland
- Country: Scotland
- Sovereign state: United Kingdom
- Postcode district: IV27 4
- Police: Scotland
- Fire: Scottish
- Ambulance: Scottish

Inshegra (Scottish Gaelic: Innis Seigrea) is a small crofting village, located two miles south east of Badcall and lies at the south east coast of Loch Inchard, in Lairg, Sutherland, Scottish Highlands and is in the Scottish council area of Highland.
