= Inchberry =

Village in Moray, Scotland

Coordinates: 57.5799°N 3.1568°W

Inchberry: Scottish Gaelic: Innis Bhairidh
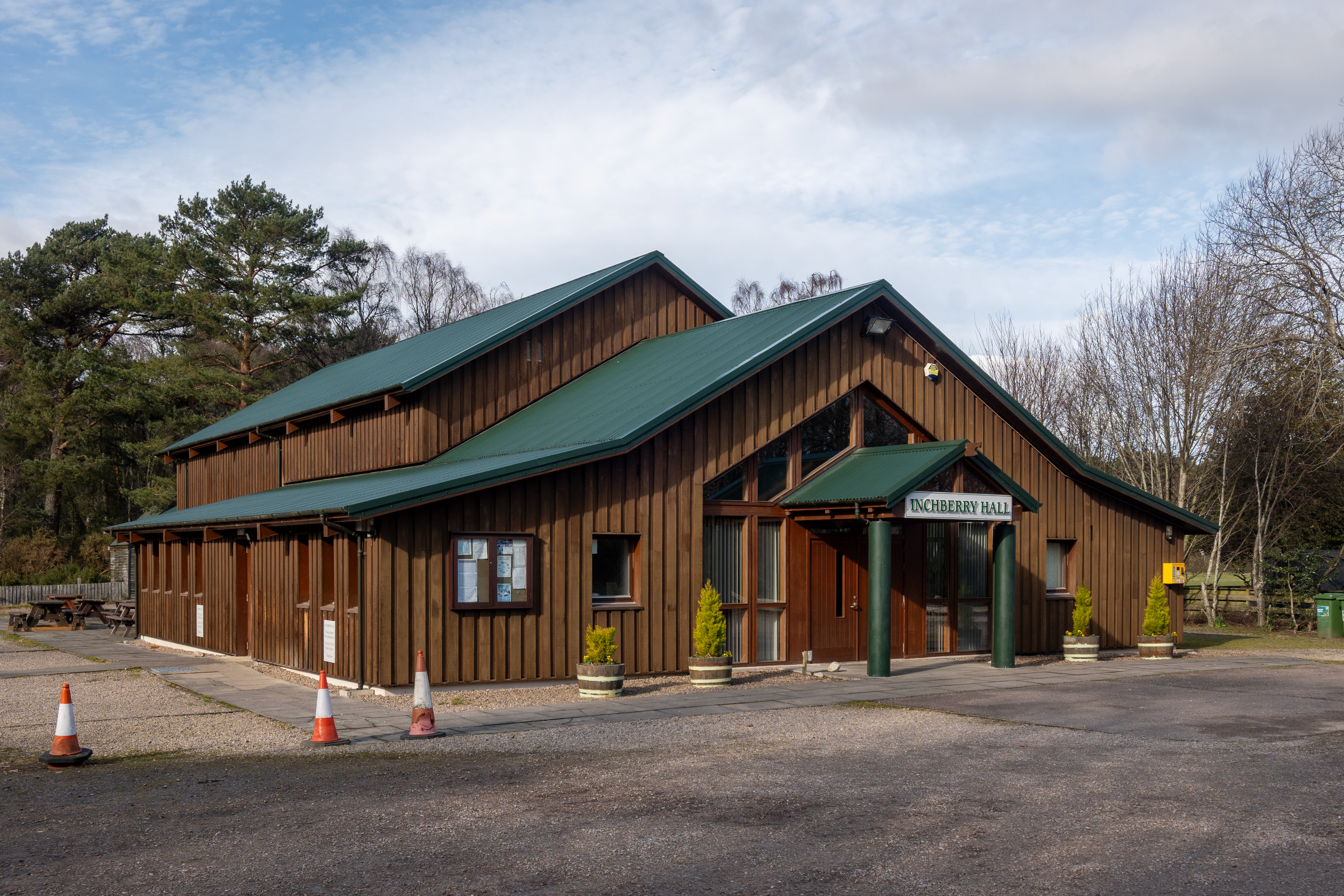
- Inchberry Hall

- Location within Moray
- Civil parish: Rothes
- Council area: Moray
- Lieutenancy area: Moray
- Country: Scotland
- Sovereign state: United Kingdom
- Police: Scotland
- Fire: Scottish
- Ambulance: Scottish

Inchberry is a small village in the civil parish of Rothes, in Moray, Scotland located about 2.5 miles (4 kilometres) south-west of Fochabers.
