= Inchs =

Hamlet in Cornwall, England

Coordinates: 50°26′30″N 4°49′18″W

Inchs or Inches is a hamlet in the parish of Withiel, Cornwall, England.
