= Listed buildings in Markington with Wallerthwaite =

Markington with Wallerthwaite is a civil parish in the county of North Yorkshire, England. It contains 13 listed buildings that are recorded in the National Heritage List for England. Of these, one is at Grade II*, the middle of the three grades, and the others are at Grade II, the lowest grade. The parish contains the village of Markington and the surrounding countryside. Most of the listed buildings are houses, farmhouses, and associated structures, and the others consist of a tower, a bridge, a disused watermill and a church.

== Key ==
| Grade | Criteria |
|---|---|
| II* | Particularly important buildings of more than special interest |
| II | Buildings of national importance and special interest |

== Buildings ==
| Name and location | Photograph | Date | Notes | Grade |
|---|---|---|---|---|
| Barn and chapel east of Markington Hall; 54.08207°N 1.55720°W | — | Late 15th century | The barn and the outbuildings converted into a chapel, are in sandstone, limestone and cobble, and have pantile roofs, that of the barn with eaves courses of stone slate. The barn has a timber framed core, five bays and side aisles. On the front are quoins, a large doorway, and blocked slit vents. The chapel range projects at right angles on the left, and contains doorways and paired pointed windows. | II |
| Markington Hall; 54.08197°N 1.55769°W | — | 17th century | A large house in gritstone and limestone, with moulded floor and eaves bands, and a stone slate roof. It has a two-storey three-bay hall range, and three-storey cross-wings with coped gables and shaped kneelers. In the centre is a doorway in an architrave, flanked by mullioned windows, and in the upper floor are sash windows. Elsewhere, most of the windows are mullioned. | II |
| Park House; 54.10421°N 1.59360°W | — | 17th century | The farmhouse, which was largely rebuilt in 1810, is in gritstone with quoins on the left, and a stone slate roof, hipped on the right, and with a coped gable on the left. There are three storeys and three bays. Above the doorway on the front is an inscribed datestone, and above it is a carved stone. The windows in the left two bays have pivoting frames, and in the right bay are cross windows. In the right return is a doorway, its jambs and lintel with chamfered surrounds, and a datestone in the lintel. To the right are a mullioned window and a mullioned and transomed window. | II |
| Hincks Hall; 54.07515°N 1.56129°W | — | Late 17th century | The farmhouse is in gritstone, and it was refronted in the 18th century in brick. It has stone quoins, and a pantile roof with three courses of stone slates, moulded gable copings, and ball finials. There are two storeys and attics, and four bays. On the front is a doorway in an original window opening, and in the projecting left bay is an ogee dated and initialled doorhead. The windows on the front are sashes, and in the attic is a two-light mullioned window. | II |
| How Hill Tower and outbuildings 54.09864°N 1.57943°W | | 1722 | A tower and outbuildings on the site of a former chapel, incorporating earlier remains. They are in limestone and gritstone with Westmorland slate roofs. The tower has two storeys, a square plan, a projecting stair bay on the south, an inscribed floor band, a modillion eaves band and a pyramidal roof with a cross. On the south front is a round-headed doorway with imposts and a keystone, above which is a decorated plaque, and a round-arched window with a chamfered surround. Against the tower are the remains of outbuildings, consisting of a three-storey block with lean-to additions to the east, and a one and two-storey block to the north. | II* |
| Rigg House Farm; 54.08702°N 1.53367°W | — | Early 18th century | The farmhouse is in stone, and has a pantile roof with coped gables. On the north front are sash windows, mostly horizontally-sliding, and a dormer. In the west and south fronts are pointed casement windows, and there is a south single-storey kitchen wing. The east front is partly rendered and has a porch. | II |
| Galand Bridge; 54.10994°N 1.57417°W | — | c. 1750 | A raised walkway in Studley Royal Park in gritstone. It consists of a round arch with a pathway below, a buttress in the centre, and a lower arch to the right over a waterfall. | II |
| Brook House; 54.07924°N 1.56456°W | — | Mid 18th century | The farmhouse is in stone and cobble, with sandstone dressings, quoins, a pantile roof to the main block, and a stone slate roof to the extension. There are two storeys, the main block has two bays, and to the right is a lower single bay extension. The doorway is in the extension, and the windows are horizontally-sliding sashes. | II |
| Gate piers north of Park House; 54.10690°N 1.59140°W | | 18th century | The gate piers at the entrance to the drive are in stone, they have a square section, and are rusticated. Each pier has a plain entablature, a deep moulded cornice, and a capstone with a ball finial. There are projecting buttresses on the inner faces with scrolled tops. | II |
| Church Farmhouse; 54.08020°N 1.56439°W | — | Mid to late 18th century | The house is in rendered limestone, and has a purple slate roof with coped gables and kneelers. There are two storeys and two bays. The doorway is in the centre, and the windows are sashes in architraves. | II |
| Foal Cote House; 54.09579°N 1.59198°W | — | Mid to late 18th century | The house is in gritstone with a projecting eaves band and a pantile roof. There are two storeys, two bays, a lower range at right angles on the left, and a rear outshut. The doorway is in the centre, the windows on the front are sashes in architraves, and elsewhere there are horizontally-sliding sashes. | II |
| Low Mill; 54.08246°N 1.55838°W | — | Early 19th century | A disused watermill in stone and rubble, with sandstone and limestone quoins, paired gutter brackets, and a Westmorland slate roof with gable copings. There are fronts of one and three bays, and on the right return is a two-storey lean-to range. In the left return is a sluice for the mill race. | II |
| St Michael's Church; 54.08084°N 1.56385°W | | 1843–44 | The church is built in gritstone, it has a Westmorland slate roof, and is in Decorated style. It consists of a nave, a south porch, and a lower chancel with a north vestry, and on the west gable is a bellcote. The porch has a pointed arch, above which is a hood mould and a statue in a niche. | II |
