= River Meig =

River in Ross-shire

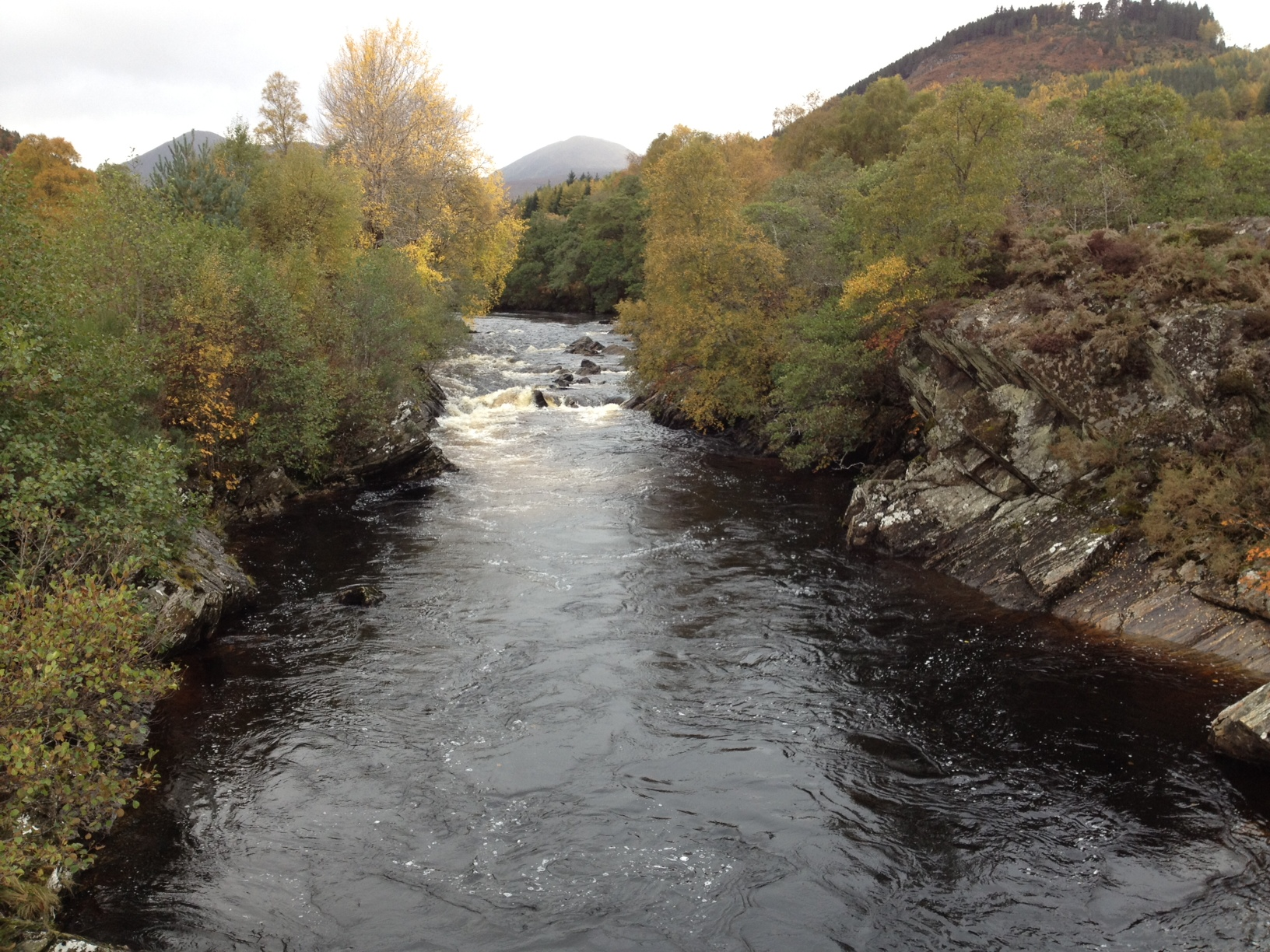

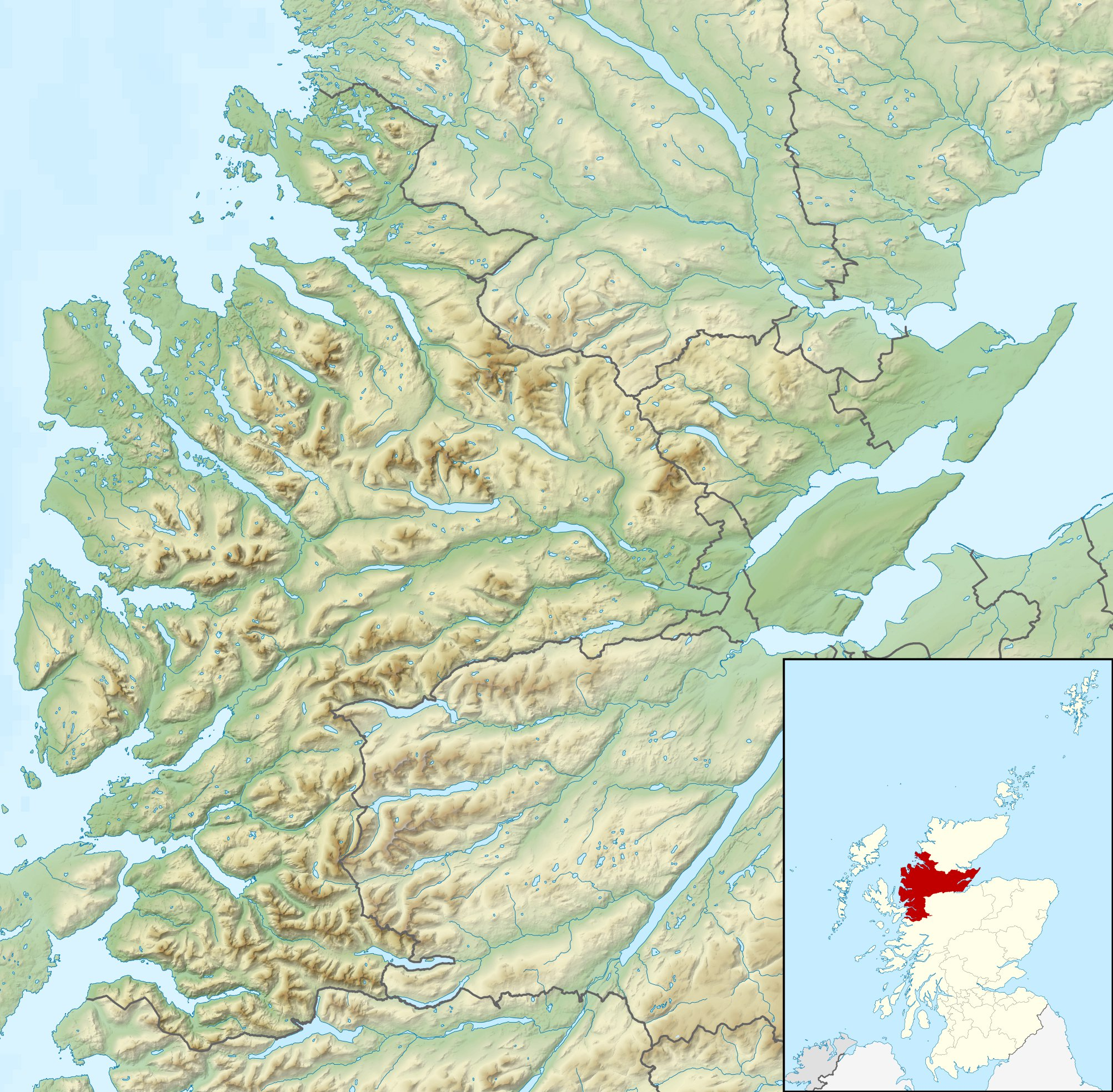
- Location of the mouth within Easter Ross
- Etymology: "Pouring Forth"

Location
- Country: Scotland

Physical characteristics
- Source
  - location: Allt an Fhuar-thuill Allt a' Choire-bheithe An Crom-allt
  - coordinates: 57.483510°N 5.140843°W
  - elevation: 290m
- Mouth
  - location: River Conon
  - coordinates: 57.5704849°N 4.681555°W
  - elevation: 30m
- Length: 37 km (23 mi)

The River Meig (Scottish Gaelic: Mìg) is a river in Easter Ross. It draws its source from the meeting of several allts in the forested hills north of Loch Monar, before flowing northeast through Loch Beannacharain and Loch Meig, before joining the River Conon at the small settlement of Little Scatwell, 2 km south of Loch Luichart. It drains into the Cromarty Firth on the east coast.

The name of the river derives from an Old Gaelic root, minc, with cognates in Latin, Old Welsh, and Old English. It roughly translates to "pouring forth".

Meig Dam was constructed on the River Meig in 1957 as part of the Conon Hydro Scheme, one of a series of post-war infrastructure projects led by the North of Scotland Hydro-Electric Board (NoSHEB). This led to the formation of a reservoir named after the river, Loch Meig.

North of the river near the settlement of Scardroy is a memorial cairn from the late-20th century dedicated to a 'Colin Grant Sangster, 1930–1994'.

Downstream of Loch Meig is Meig Gorge (Am Mòr-Ghil Mhìg), a popular location for local kayakers. The gorge is best kayaked in dry weather thanks to compensation flow from the nearby dam; it is potentially too dangerous after heavy rainfall. The main drop in the gorge is colloquially known as "Tea Cup Falls".
