= Inhurst =

Village in Hampshire, England

Coordinates: 51.3483°N 1.1750°W

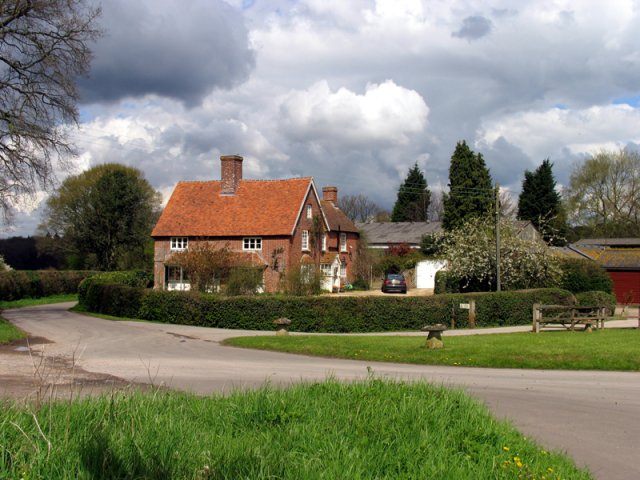
- Inhurst Farm

- Location within Hampshire
- Civil parish: Baughurst
- District: Basingstoke and Deane
- Shire county: Hampshire
- Region: South East
- Country: England
- Sovereign state: United Kingdom
- Post town: Tadley
- Postcode district: RG26
- Dialling code: 0118
- Police: Hampshire and Isle of Wight
- Fire: Hampshire and Isle of Wight
- Ambulance: South Central
- UK Parliament: North West Hampshire
- Website: www.baughurst-pc.gov.uk

Inhurst is a hamlet in Hampshire, England. It is in the civil parish of Baughurst.

== History ==
Inhurst House was established as a school in the 1960s but closed in July, 1999 when it merged with Cheam School. It was bought and renovated by Bewley Homes and is now their head office.

== Governance ==
The hamlet of Inhurst is part of the civil parish of Baughurst and is part of the Baughurst and Tadley North ward of Basingstoke and Deane borough council. The borough council is a Non-metropolitan district of Hampshire County Council.

== Notable residents ==
Inhurst House was the home of Frederick Stokes, the first captain of the England national rugby union team, who played for and captained the team in the first three rugby internationals, all between England and Scotland. He was also the youngest ever president of the Rugby Football Union.
