= Ingerthorpe =

Hamlet in North Yorkshire, England

Coordinates: 54.090827°N 1.5519342°W

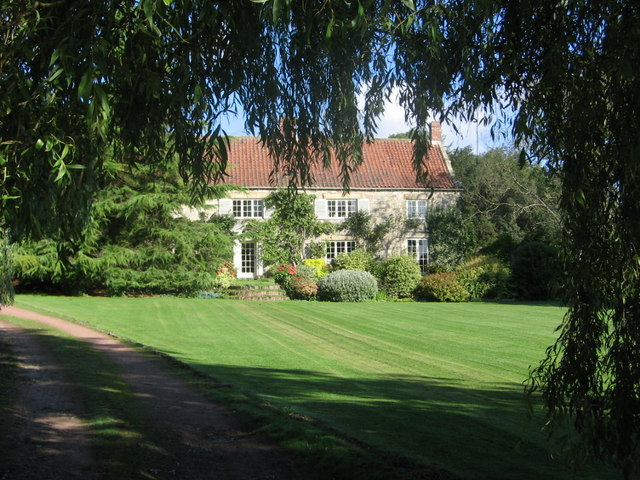
- Ingerthorpe Hall

- Location within North Yorkshire
- Civil parish: Markington with Wallerthwaite
- Unitary authority: North Yorkshire
- Ceremonial county: North Yorkshire
- Region: Yorkshire and the Humber
- Country: England
- Sovereign state: United Kingdom
- Police: North Yorkshire
- Fire: North Yorkshire
- Ambulance: Yorkshire

Ingerthorpe is a hamlet and former civil parish about 7 miles (11 km) from Harrogate, now in the parish of Markington with Wallerthwaite, in the county of North Yorkshire, England. In 1931 the parish had a population of 64.

From 1974 to 2023 it was part of the Borough of Harrogate. It is now administered by the unitary North Yorkshire Council.

== History ==
The name "Ingerthorpe" means 'Ingrid's outlying farm/settlement'. Earthworks that are purported to be Ingerthorpe medieval village are visible on historic air photos, however they have been listed as rejected or doubtful. Ingerthorpe is not recorded in the Domesday Book and it was not mentioned before the late 12th century. Ingerthorpe was formerly a township in the parish of Ripon; from 1866 Ingerthorpe was a civil parish in its own right until it was abolished and merged with Markington with Wallerthwaite on 1 April 1937.
