= Inverroy =

Coordinates: 56.88992°N 4.8593°W

Inverroy: Scottish Gaelic: Inbhir Ruaidh
- Location within the Lochaber area
- OS grid reference: NN259812
- Council area: Highland
- Country: Scotland
- Sovereign state: United Kingdom
- Post town: Roybridge
- Postcode district: PH31 4
- Police: Scotland
- Fire: Scottish
- Ambulance: Scottish

Inverroy (Scottish Gaelic: Inbhir Ruaidh) is a scattered village situated 2 miles east of Spean Bridge in Inverness-shire in the Scottish Highlands and is in the Scottish council area of Highland.
