= List of listed buildings in Stirling (council area) =

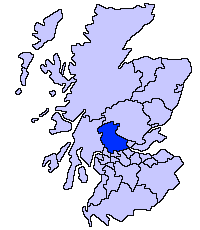
Stirling shown within Scotland

This is a list of listed buildings in the Stirling council area. The list is split out by parish.

- List of listed buildings in Aberfoyle, Stirling
- List of listed buildings in Balfron, Stirling
- List of listed buildings in Balquhidder, Stirling
- List of listed buildings in Bridge Of Allan, Stirling
- List of listed buildings in Buchanan, Stirling
- List of listed buildings in Callander, Stirling
- List of listed buildings in Comrie, Stirling
- List of listed buildings in Doune, Stirling
- List of listed buildings in Drymen, Stirling
- List of listed buildings in Dunblane And Lecropt, Stirling
- List of listed buildings in Dunblane, Stirling
- List of listed buildings in Fintry, Stirling
- List of listed buildings in Gargunnock, Stirling
- List of listed buildings in Killearn, Stirling
- List of listed buildings in Killin, Stirling
- List of listed buildings in Kilmadock, Stirling
- List of listed buildings in Kilmaronock, Stirling
- List of listed buildings in Kincardine-In-Menteith, Stirling
- List of listed buildings in Kippen, Stirling
- List of listed buildings in Logie, Stirling
- List of listed buildings in Port Of Menteith, Stirling
- List of listed buildings in St Ninians, Stirling
- List of listed buildings in Stirling, Stirling
- List of listed buildings in Strathblane, Stirling

== See also ==
- Scheduled monuments in Stirling
