= List of listed buildings in Dunblane And Lecropt =

This is a list of listed buildings in the parish of Dunblane and Lecropt in Stirling, Scotland.

== List ==
Name	Location	Date Listed	Grid Ref. (Note: Sometimes known as OSGB36, the grid reference (where provided) is based on the British national grid reference system used by the Ordnance Survey. • "Guide to National Grid". Ordnance Survey. • "Get-a-map". Ordnance Survey.)	Geo-coordinates	Notes	LB Number (Note: Historic Environment Scotland assign a unique alphanumeric identifier to each designated site in Scotland, for listed buildings this always begins with "LB", for example "LB12345".)	Image
Keir, Footbridge Over Home Farm Drive				56°10′01″N 3°58′56″W	Category B	3972	Upload Photo
Keir, Walled Garden				56°10′02″N 3°59′01″W	Category B	3977	Upload Photo
Kippenross Bridge Over Allan Water				56°10′36″N 3°57′48″W	Category C(S)	3932	Upload Photo
Keir House, Terrace, Steps And Terminal Feature				56°09′58″N 3°59′02″W	Category C(S)	170	Upload Photo
Mortuary Chapel Of Campbells Of Aberuchill And Kilbride And Surrounding Graveyard Near Torrance				56°12′04″N 4°00′27″W	Category C(S)	175	Upload Photo
Kilbryde Walled Garden				56°12′34″N 4°00′31″W	Category C(S)	3955	Upload Photo
Keir, Avenue Bridge Over Home Farm Drive				56°10′02″N 3°58′54″W	Category B	3973	Upload Photo
Queen Victoria School, Dunblane				56°12′03″N 3°57′11″W	Category A	3986	Upload another image See more images
Keir House, Stud House				56°10′09″N 3°58′46″W	Category C(S)	3917	Upload Photo
Keir, Old Lecropt Churchyard				56°09′30″N 3°57′52″W	Category B	3922	Upload Photo
Stonehill, Farmhouse				56°11′08″N 3°55′56″W	Category C(S)	3927	Upload Photo
Keir House, Lower Glen Section				56°09′50″N 3°59′25″W	Category B	3941	Upload Photo
Keir House, Bathing House				56°09′55″N 3°59′18″W	Category B	3942	Upload Photo
Lecropt Manse				56°09′31″N 3°57′32″W	Category B	174	Upload Photo
Keir, Sundial				56°09′58″N 3°59′04″W	Category B	3969	Upload Photo
Old Glassingal House				56°13′05″N 3°56′38″W	Category B	3994	Upload Photo
Old Kippenross				56°10′32″N 3°57′41″W	Category B	3931	Upload Photo
Keir West Terrace				56°09′58″N 3°59′02″W	Category B	3936	Upload Photo
Lecropt Church				56°09′31″N 3°57′54″W	Category A	173	Upload Photo
Keir, Garden Seat Over S. Tunnelmouth				56°10′01″N 3°58′57″W	Category C(S)	3971	Upload Photo
Garden House, Glassingal				56°13′04″N 3°56′19″W	Category B	3992	Upload Photo
North Lodge, Glassingal				56°13′01″N 3°56′51″W	Category B	3993	Upload Photo
Kinbuck Bridge Over Allan Water				56°13′32″N 3°57′04″W	Category B	3998	Upload another image See more images
Keir House, Keir Home Farm				56°10′14″N 3°58′42″W	Category A	3918	Upload Photo
Sheriffmuir Inn				56°11′50″N 3°53′31″W	Category C(S)	3925	Upload Photo
Kippenross House				56°10′37″N 3°57′32″W	Category B	3928	Upload Photo
Railway Viaduct At Old Mill Of Keir, S. Of Kippenross House Tunnelmouth To N				56°10′31″N 3°57′35″W	Category C(S)	3934	Upload Photo
Keir House, Ice House				56°10′07″N 3°58′51″W	Category B	3943	Upload Photo
Arnhall Castle				56°09′51″N 3°59′33″W	Category B	171	Upload Photo
Cromlix House Including Game Larder, Ancillary Building, Gatepiers And Garden Boundary Walls				56°13′54″N 3°57′59″W	Category C(S)	50619	Upload Photo
Keir, Terracing And Column To East				56°10′00″N 3°58′53″W	Category C(S)	3975	Upload Photo
Memorial Chapel, Dunblane				56°12′00″N 3°57′10″W	Category A	3987	Upload Photo
Infirmary, Dunblane				56°11′59″N 3°57′06″W	Category C(S)	3988	Upload Photo
Gateside, Octagon				56°12′55″N 3°56′14″W	Category C(S)	3995	Upload Photo
Lecropt School				56°09′28″N 3°57′27″W	Category B	3908	Upload Photo
Kilbryde Castle				56°12′34″N 4°00′26″W	Category B	3909	Upload Photo
Keir, Tunnel And Terrace Over				56°10′01″N 3°58′57″W	Category B	3970	Upload Photo
Queen Victoria School, Dunblane, Wall And Gates				56°12′07″N 3°57′16″W	Category C(S)	3990	Upload Photo
Cromlix House, Sundial And Flanking Pair Of Gatepiers (Formerly Fireplace Jambs)				56°13′54″N 3°57′59″W	Category A	3997	Upload another image
Kilbryde Stable Block				56°12′36″N 4°00′30″W	Category B	3910	Upload Photo
Keir House, Water House				56°10′09″N 3°58′57″W	Category C(S)	3915	Upload Photo
Keir, South Lodge				56°10′07″N 3°58′24″W	Category A	3921	Upload Photo
Keir House, Archway South Of, Carrying West Drive				56°09′58″N 3°58′54″W	Category B	3940	Upload Photo
Keir House Avenue Bridge William Stirling Cenotaph				56°10′02″N 3°58′54″W	Category B	3974	Upload Photo
Keir, Encircling Wall Of Eastern Portion Of Gardens Running From Keir House To Stud House A) Salve Gateway B) Gateway & Stairs On N. Lodge Drive C) Swan Gateway, Stud House				56°10′04″N 3°58′27″W	Category B	3976	Upload Photo
Ryland (Formerly Kippendavie) Lodge, Dunblane				56°11′50″N 3°56′46″W	Category C(S)	3985	Upload Photo
Keir House, Lodge				56°10′17″N 3°58′42″W	Category B	3919	Upload Photo
Keir House North Lodge				56°10′05″N 3°58′10″W	Category C(S)	3920	Upload Photo
Railway Viaduct At Old Mill Of Keir, S. Of Kippenross House				56°10′30″N 3°57′35″W	Category B	3933	Upload Photo
Lecropt Church Cottage				56°09′29″N 3°57′51″W	Category C(S)	47649	Upload Photo
Keir House Walled Garden Screen Wall And Gateway To N.W				56°10′05″N 3°59′04″W	Category B	3978	Upload Photo
Keir House Water Garden				56°09′58″N 3°59′17″W	Category C(S)	3979	Upload Photo
Headmaster's House, Dunblane				56°12′07″N 3°57′13″W	Category C(S)	3989	Upload Photo
Glassingal House, South Lodge				56°12′52″N 3°56′55″W	Category B	3991	Upload Photo
Wester Cambushinnie, Cottar House And Bothy				56°14′12″N 3°57′10″W	Category C(S)	3999	Upload Photo
Keir House, Gardens House				56°09′59″N 3°58′59″W	Category C(S)	3916	Upload Photo
Keir, Bairnsburn				56°09′40″N 3°58′27″W	Category C(S)	3923	Upload Photo
Keir, Old Walled Garden West Of (Camey Bank)				56°09′38″N 3°59′11″W	Category C(S)	3924	Upload Photo
Sheriffmuir, Macrae Memorial				56°11′43″N 3°54′37″W	Category B	3926	Upload Photo
Kippenross Sundial				56°10′36″N 3°57′31″W	Category C(S)	3929	Upload Photo
Kippenross Walled Garden				56°10′33″N 3°57′45″W	Category B	3930	Upload Photo
Keir House				56°09′58″N 3°58′58″W	Category A	3935	Upload another image See more images

== Key ==
The scheme for classifying buildings in Scotland is:

- Category A: "buildings of national or international importance, either architectural or historic; or fine, little-altered examples of some particular period, style or building type."
- Category B: "buildings of regional or more than local importance; or major examples of some particular period, style or building type, which may have been altered."
- Category C: "buildings of local importance; lesser examples of any period, style, or building type, as originally constructed or moderately altered; and simple traditional buildings which group well with other listed buildings."

In March 2016 there were 47,288 listed buildings in Scotland. Of these, 8% were Category A, and 50% were Category B, with the remaining 42% being Category C.
