= Archie Stirling =

Scottish Theatrical producer and a former officer in the Scots Guards

- Laird of the Keir estate
- Known for: Theatrical producer and a former officer in the Scots Guards
- Born: 18 September 1941 (age 84)
- Spouses: Charmian Rachel Montagu Douglas Scott (m. 1964; div. 1977) Diana Rigg (m. 1982; div. 1990) Sharon Silver (m. 2000)
- Issue: 4, including Rachael Stirling

Archibald Hugh Stirling, Laird of Keir (born 18 September 1941), is a Scottish theatrical producer, a former officer in the Scots Guards, and Laird of the Keir estate at Lecropt in the Stirling council area in Scotland.

Stirling is the eldest son of William Joseph Stirling of Keir (9 May 1911 – 1983) and his wife (m. 22 November 1940) Susan Rachel Bligh (12 August 1916 – 1983), and a nephew of David Stirling, who was the founder of the Special Air Service. Archie, his father, and his uncle are descendants of Charles II of Scotland and England. His sister Hannah is married to the 7th Marquess of Salisbury.

== Marriages ==
Stirling's first wife was Charmian Rachel Montagu Douglas Scott (18 July 1942 – 5 April 2009). They married on 11 November 1964 and were divorced in 1977. She was the niece of Princess Alice, Duchess of Gloucester, and the granddaughter of the 7th Duke of Buccleuch. The couple had two sons, William Rory Alexander Stirling, born on 15 December 1965, and Ludovic David Stirling, born on 29 April 1967.

Stirling was married to actress Dame Diana Rigg (20 July 1938 – 10 September 2020) from 1982 to 1990. Their only child is the actress Rachael Stirling, who was born in 1977. Their marriage ended in divorce after Stirling had an affair with actress Joely Richardson.

Stirling married Sharon Silver of New York City on 4 August 2000. They have one child.

== Scottish Voice political party ==
On 4 January 2007, news media reported that Stirling (referred to as a "Scots millionaire") had begun setting up a new political party aiming to improve standards at the Scottish Parliament in order "to make Scottish politics work for the disillusioned majority," and will "also put defending the Union at the heart of its policy." The politically conservative party, known as Scottish Voice, was formally launched in February 2007, and stood in the Scottish Elections of 2007, but drew a low vote and failed to gain any seats.

Further coverage and analysis published on 5 January 2007 was provided by The Herald and The Scotsman. The party was backed by an unnamed group of like-minded people, including the millionaire Inverness businessman Robert McLeod Hotchkiss, opposed to the breakup of the United Kingdom. Due to a breach in security, information and documents were leaked in advance of the launch.

In April 2012, Stirling announced that he was winding up the party.
