= Charmian Campbell =

British artist (1942-2009)

Charmian Campbell (born Charmian Rachel Montagu Douglas Scott; 18 July 1942 – 5 April 2009) was a British socialite and artist.

She was born at Selkirk in the Scottish Borders to portrait painter Mary Winona Mannin "Molly" Bishop and Lord George Montagu Douglas Scott, the youngest son of the Duke of Buccleuch and Queensberry, Scotland's largest landowner (making her a niece to Princess Alice, Duchess of Gloucester). After World War II her parents settled in Wiltshire, where Charmian grew up with two siblings, Georgina Mary "Gina" and David.

In 1958 she left school to study art in Florence. She went on to study briefly at the Chelsea School of Art, where she quickly realized she was not happy and left. She then began modelling and found success until a car crash left her with minor facial injuries. During this time she was commissioned to draw Lady Antonia Fraser's eldest daughter. Charmian Campbell went on to a successful drawing career. She drew the children of the King and Queen of Spain, the children of Prince and Princess Michael of Kent, and actress Natalie Wood and her children. She supported the Amber Trust, a musical charity for blind and disabled children, and other charities by creating portraits for auction.

== Marriages ==
In 1964 she married Archie Stirling, elder son of Colonel William Stirling of Keir, and moved back to Scotland. After having two sons, William and Ludovic, she and Stirling divorced in 1977.

After moving to Stockwell, South London, she married Colin Campbell, a television executive, and became stepmother to his two daughters from his previous marriage.

== Death ==
Charmian Campbell died on 5 April 2009, aged 66. Her husband, sons and stepchildren survive her.
