= Scottish Voice =

- Leader: Archie Stirling
- Founded: 2007
- Dissolved: 2012
- Headquarters: Keir Estate Office, Craigarnhall, Bridge of Allan, Stirling, FK9 4NG
- Political position: Centre-right

Website
- www.scottishvoice.net

Scottish Voice (provisionally named the Scottish Democrats) was a Scottish centre-right political party, launched in February 2007 by Archie Stirling, a wealthy businessman and landowner. The party headquarters were at Craigarnhall, by the town of Bridge of Allan, in the historical parish of Lecropt.

Although Stirling personally is a Unionist, in a statement he said "The position of Scotland within the union is not central to this movement." Many of the new party's supporters were formerly in the Scottish Conservatives, but have found themselves in disagreement with it, particularly after its massive decline in Scottish politics in the 1980s and 1990s.

At the beginning of April The Scotsman website reported an opinion poll which suggested 21 per cent of voters could cast their regional vote for Scottish Voice. If this support had held until the Scottish Parliament election in May they could have secured a regional list seat. Other news suggested that the Scottish Voice campaign was failing despite importing election agents from Canada to support it.

Polling information published on the eve of the election by The Scotsman suggested there was considerably less support for Scottish Voice than the earlier quoted opinion poll. No minor parties, other than the Scottish Green Party were returned in the election, and Scottish Voice failed to win any seats.

Scottish Voice received a total of 8,782 votes across the whole of Scotland and this resulted in no Scottish Voice MSPs being elected. The Scotsman reported on 31 August 2007 that figures published by the Electoral Commission revealed Scottish Voice spent £184,920 on its campaign for the Scottish elections that year. This is equivalent of £21.06 for every vote. This made it the most expensive party per vote generated.

In April 2012, Stirling announced that he was winding-up the party.
