= List of listed buildings in Comrie, Stirling =

This is a list of listed buildings in the parish of Comrie in Stirling, Scotland.

== List ==
Name	Location	Date Listed	Grid Ref. (Note: Sometimes known as OSGB36, the grid reference (where provided) is based on the British national grid reference system used by the Ordnance Survey. • "Guide to National Grid". Ordnance Survey. • "Get-a-map". Ordnance Survey.)	Geo-coordinates	Notes	LB Number (Note: Historic Environment Scotland assign a unique alphanumeric identifier to each designated site in Scotland, for listed buildings this always begins with "LB", for example "LB12345".)	Image
Lochearnhead, Briar Cottage				56°23′11″N 4°16′15″W	Category B	4173	Upload Photo
Loch Earn, Dalveich, Cottage				56°23′28″N 4°14′47″W	Category B	50372	Upload Photo
Lochearnhead, Auchraw Terrace, Wester Auchraw Croft				56°23′11″N 4°16′51″W	Category B	4172	Upload Photo
Loch Earn, Dalkenneth Including Gatepiers				56°23′30″N 4°12′42″W	Category C(S)	50371	Upload Photo
Lochearnhead, Former Railway Viaduct Over The Ogle Burn				56°23′16″N 4°17′14″W	Category B	4170	Upload Photo
Lochearnhead, Bridge On A65 Over Ogle Burn				56°23′10″N 4°17′07″W	Category C(S)	47554	Upload Photo
Lochearnhead, Leckine, Maclaren Clan Burial Ground				56°23′16″N 4°15′58″W	Category C(S)	50374	Upload Photo

== Key ==
The scheme for classifying buildings in Scotland is:

- Category A: "buildings of national or international importance, either architectural or historic; or fine, little-altered examples of some particular period, style or building type."
- Category B: "buildings of regional or more than local importance; or major examples of some particular period, style or building type, which may have been altered."
- Category C: "buildings of local importance; lesser examples of any period, style, or building type, as originally constructed or moderately altered; and simple traditional buildings which group well with other listed buildings."

In March 2016 there were 47,288 listed buildings in Scotland. Of these, 8% were Category A, and 50% were Category B, with the remaining 42% being Category C.
