= List of listed buildings in Killearn, Stirling =

This is a list of listed buildings in the parish of Killearn in Stirling, Scotland.

== List ==
Name	Location	Date listed	Grid ref. (Note: Sometimes known as OSGB36, the grid reference (where provided) is based on the British national grid reference system used by the Ordnance Survey. • "Guide to National Grid". Ordnance Survey. • "Get-a-map". Ordnance Survey.)	Geo-coordinates	Notes	LB number (Note: Historic Environment Scotland assign a unique alphanumeric identifier to each designated site in Scotland, for listed buildings this always begins with "LB", for example "LB12345".)	Image
Manse				56°02′39″N 4°22′26″W	Category B	10388	Upload Photo
Buchanan Monument				56°02′38″N 4°22′23″W	Category A	10389	Upload another image See more images
Killearn, Auchenibert With Terraced Garden				56°02′32″N 4°21′36″W	Category A	10422	Upload Photo
West Drive Bridge Ballikinrain Castle				56°03′21″N 4°18′44″W	Category B	10426	Upload Photo
Nos 5, 7 And 9 The Square				56°02′36″N 4°22′21″W	Category B	10390	Upload Photo
Moss				56°01′28″N 4°22′56″W	Category C(S)	10421	Upload Photo
East Drive Bridge Ballikinrain Castle				56°03′28″N 4°18′17″W	Category B	10425	Upload Photo
Killearn Aqueduct Bridge (former Glasgow Corporation Waterworks)				56°02′19″N 4°21′54″W	Category B	51139	Upload another image See more images
Parish Church (Church Hall)				56°02′42″N 4°22′21″W	Category B	10386	Upload Photo
Boquhan Old House				56°03′29″N 4°20′19″W	Category B	10392	Upload Photo
Carbeth House				56°03′29″N 4°22′19″W	Category B	10395	Upload Photo
West Lodge And Archway, Ballikinrain Castle				56°03′30″N 4°19′39″W	Category B	10424	Upload Photo
Killearn, 15 Balfron Road (Seaton), Former Free Church Manse Including Boundary Wall And Gatepiers				56°02′47″N 4°22′18″W	Category C(S)	49095	Upload Photo
Endrick Aqueduct Pipe Bridge (former Glasgow Corporation Waterworks)				56°03′39″N 4°21′51″W	Category B	51138	Upload Photo
Lettre Byewash And Access Chamber With Boundary Wall, Railings And Gates (former Glasgow Corporation Waterworks)				56°01′59″N 4°21′47″W	Category B	51140	Upload Photo
Dovecot, Park Hall				56°03′30″N 4°20′55″W	Category C(S)	10393	Upload Photo
Drumtian Farm Barn				56°03′46″N 4°22′50″W	Category B	10427	Upload Photo
Toll House				56°02′43″N 4°22′18″W	Category B	10391	Upload another image See more images
Balfron Road, Killearn Parish Church (Church Of Scotland) With Railings, Boundary Wall And Gatepiers				56°02′40″N 4°22′23″W	Category B	45662	Upload another image See more images
Old Ballikinrain				56°03′46″N 4°18′55″W	Category B	10394	Upload Photo
Ballikinrain Castle (Church Of Scotland Residential School)				56°03′23″N 4°18′33″W	Category B	10423	Upload Photo
Killearn, Drumbeg Loan, Drumwhirn				56°02′03″N 4°22′10″W	Category C(S)	48267	Upload Photo
Walls Of Old Kirk And Graveyard				56°02′34″N 4°22′22″W	Category B	10387	Upload another image See more images
Carston				56°01′36″N 4°24′00″W	Category C(S)	10396	Upload Photo

== Key ==
The scheme for classifying buildings in Scotland is:

- Category A: "buildings of national or international importance, either architectural or historic; or fine, little-altered examples of some particular period, style or building type."
- Category B: "buildings of regional or more than local importance; or major examples of some particular period, style or building type, which may have been altered."
- Category C: "buildings of local importance; lesser examples of any period, style, or building type, as originally constructed or moderately altered; and simple traditional buildings which group well with other listed buildings."

In March 2016 there were 47,288 listed buildings in Scotland. Of these, 8% were Category A, and 50% were Category B, with the remaining 42% being Category C.
