= List of listed buildings in Kippen, Stirling =

This is a list of listed buildings in the parish of Kippen in Stirling, Scotland.

== List ==
Name	Location	Date listed	Geo-coordinates	Notes	Category	LB number	Image
Glentirranmuir, Bochastle And Glentirran Cottages			56°07′25″N 4°09′36″W		C(S)	45586	Upload Photo
Kippen, Main Street, Post Office And Grocer With Pillar Box And Buchanan House			56°07′35″N 4°10′18″W		C(S)	12514	Upload Photo
Main Street Kippen War Memorial			56°07′37″N 4°10′15″W		C(S)	8154	Upload Photo
Bailie Bows Bridge			56°06′14″N 4°10′05″W		C(S)	8156	Upload Photo
Arnprior Farm			56°07′37″N 4°13′56″W		B	8165	Upload Photo
Edina House Fore Street			56°07′38″N 4°10′16″W		B	8170	Upload Photo
Buchlyvie, Main Street, Marfield			56°06′55″N 4°17′34″W		C(S)	8184	Upload Photo
Dovecote, Laraben			56°07′54″N 4°12′44″W		B	6727	Upload Photo
Buchlyvie, Station Road, North Manse With Gatepiers, Gate And Boundary Walls			56°06′59″N 4°17′44″W		C(S)	45584	Upload Photo
Hillside House Main Street (South Side)			56°07′36″N 4°10′14″W		C(S)	8152	Upload Photo
Spittalton House Buchlyvie (Mr Drysdale)			56°06′58″N 4°17′28″W		B	8159	Upload Photo
Garden			56°07′20″N 4°15′28″W		B	8167	Upload Photo
Fore Street Store (On S Of Courtyard To Edina House)			56°07′37″N 4°10′16″W		C(S)	8171	Upload Photo
Kirkhill Main Street (South Side)			56°07′37″N 4°10′12″W		C(S)	8180	Upload Photo
Buchlyvie, Main Street, Garyvard			56°06′54″N 4°17′34″W		C(S)	13668	Upload Photo
Ruin Of Old Kirk			56°07′38″N 4°10′14″W		B	8164	Upload Photo
Cardross Bridge			56°08′51″N 4°15′25″W		B	8166	Upload Photo
Black Horse Back Road Black Bull House			56°07′38″N 4°10′16″W		B	8172	Upload another image
Glenora Main Street (North Side)			56°07′36″N 4°10′17″W		C(S)	8178	Upload Photo
Gribloch House And Swimming Pool			56°06′53″N 4°11′17″W		A	8191	Upload Photo
Parish Church Buchlyvie			56°06′59″N 4°17′25″W		C(S)	8157	Upload Photo
Torfield			56°07′42″N 4°10′26″W		C(S)	8168	Upload Photo
Glebe House Main Street			56°07′39″N 4°10′15″W		C(S)	8174	Upload Photo
Mrs Buchanan Main Street (North Side)			56°07′33″N 4°10′24″W		C(S)	8175	Upload Photo
Kippen, Former Signal Box			56°08′07″N 4°09′00″W		B	8181	Upload Photo
Buchlyvie, Main Street, Rhuallan			56°06′55″N 4°17′33″W		C(S)	8185	Upload Photo
Gribloch House Garage And Staff Accommodation			56°06′54″N 4°11′10″W		B	8192	Upload Photo
Gribloch House Lodge			56°07′02″N 4°11′24″W		B	8193	Upload Photo
Buchlyvie, Off Main Street, Arivain With Ancillary Structures, Boundary Walls, Gatepiers And Gates			56°06′59″N 4°17′27″W		C(S)	45585	Upload Photo
Parish Church			56°07′39″N 4°10′23″W		B	8163	Upload another image See more images
Buchlyvie, Main Street, Willow Cottage			56°06′55″N 4°17′33″W		C(S)	8187	Upload Photo
Wrightpark			56°06′28″N 4°10′55″W		B	8155	Upload Photo
Bridge Over Boquhan Burn			56°08′12″N 4°08′43″W		B	8160	Upload Photo
Kippen Stores Main Street (North Side)			56°07′37″N 4°10′16″W		C(S)	8176	Upload Photo
Buchlyvie, Main Street, Mill Cottage			56°06′54″N 4°17′36″W		B	8182	Upload Photo
Buchlyvie, Main Street, Mossview With Shop			56°06′55″N 4°17′34″W		C(S)	8183	Upload Photo
Kippen, Station Road, Dun Eaglais, Including Designed Garden			56°07′40″N 4°10′02″W		A	12515	Upload Photo
Ben View Main Street (South Side)			56°07′36″N 4°10′15″W		C(S)	8153	Upload Photo
Miss Rennie Back Road			56°07′38″N 4°10′16″W		C(S)	8173	Upload Photo
Cross Keys Hotel Main Street (North Side)			56°07′36″N 4°10′18″W		C(S)	8179	Upload Photo
Former Associated Synod Church Buchlyvie			56°06′58″N 4°17′45″W		B	8158	Upload Photo
Helensfield, Fore Street			56°07′40″N 4°10′22″W		B	8169	Upload Photo
Jean Donaldson And Former Post Office Main Street (North Side)			56°07′35″N 4°10′19″W		C(S)	8177	Upload Photo
Buchlyvie Main Street, Ferguslie			56°06′56″N 4°17′32″W		C(S)	8186	Upload Photo

== Key ==
The scheme for classifying buildings in Scotland is:

- Category A: "buildings of national or international importance, either architectural or historic; or fine, little-altered examples of some particular period, style or building type."
- Category B: "buildings of regional or more than local importance; or major examples of some particular period, style or building type, which may have been altered."
- Category C: "buildings of local importance; lesser examples of any period, style, or building type, as originally constructed or moderately altered; and simple traditional buildings which group well with other listed buildings."

In March 2016 there were 47,288 listed buildings in Scotland. Of these, 8% were Category A, and 50% were Category B, with the remaining 42% being Category C.
