= List of listed buildings in Balquhidder, Stirling =

This is a list of listed buildings in the parish of Balquhidder in Stirling, Scotland.

== List ==
Name	Location	Date Listed	Grid Ref. (Note: Sometimes known as OSGB36, the grid reference (where provided) is based on the British national grid reference system used by the Ordnance Survey. • "Guide to National Grid". Ordnance Survey. • "Get-a-map". Ordnance Survey.)	Geo-coordinates	Notes	LB Number (Note: Historic Environment Scotland assign a unique alphanumeric identifier to each designated site in Scotland, for listed buildings this always begins with "LB", for example "LB12345".)	Image
Edinchip House With Terraces, Lodge, Bridge, Gardener's Cottage, Kennels, Former Steading And Other Ancillary Buildings				56°22′23″N 4°18′20″W	Category C(S)	50340	Upload Photo
Strathyre, Coire Buidhe And St Ola				56°19′25″N 4°19′43″W	Category C(S)	50345	Upload Photo
Strathyre, Monument To Dugald Buchanan				56°19′27″N 4°19′44″W	Category C(S)	50348	Upload Photo
Stronvar Bridge Over River Balvag				56°21′18″N 4°22′21″W	Category B	4187	Upload Photo
Strathyre, Bridge Over The River Balvag				56°19′31″N 4°19′47″W	Category B	4194	Upload Photo
Strathyre, Immervoulin				56°19′12″N 4°19′44″W	Category C(S)	4195	Upload Photo
Glen Ogle, Bridge On A85 Over Allt An Sput Dhuibh				56°24′03″N 4°18′05″W	Category C(S)	4136	Upload Photo
Kingshouse, Signpost				56°21′13″N 4°19′31″W	Category C(S)	50342	Upload Photo
Balquhidder, Kirkton Bridge				56°21′27″N 4°22′22″W	Category C(S)	4186	Upload Photo
Imirriabhach, Burial Enclosure				56°20′22″N 4°29′32″W	Category C(S)	4192	Upload Photo
Glen Ogle, 3-Arch Railway Bridge				56°24′30″N 4°19′05″W	Category C(S)	229	Upload Photo
Balquhidder, Ardachaidh				56°21′26″N 4°22′20″W	Category C(S)	50336	Upload Photo
Balquhidder, Former School And Schoolhouse Including Boundary Walls				56°21′28″N 4°22′11″W	Category C(S)	50338	Upload Photo
Strathyre, Corriegowrie				56°19′29″N 4°19′43″W	Category C(S)	50346	Upload Photo
Lochearnhead, St Angus Episcopal Church				56°22′49″N 4°17′14″W	Category B	44186	Upload Photo
Glen Ogle Viaduct				56°24′54″N 4°19′46″W	Category B	4141	Upload Photo
Craigruie With Walled Garden And Other Ancillary Structures				56°20′56″N 4°25′55″W	Category B	50339	Upload Photo
Lochearnhead, Craggan, Druidfield Croft				56°22′45″N 4°17′25″W	Category C(S)	50343	Upload Photo
Strathyre, Dochfour And Mandalay				56°19′32″N 4°19′39″W	Category C(S)	50347	Upload Photo
Stronvar House				56°21′08″N 4°22′56″W	Category B	4188	Upload Photo
Stronvar Farm				56°21′07″N 4°23′02″W	Category B	4189	Upload Photo
Glen Ogle, Bridge On A85 Over Ogle Burn Near Glen Ogle Farm				56°23′44″N 4°17′42″W	Category C(S)	4134	Upload Photo
Glen Ogle, Bridge On A85 Glen Ogle, Bridge Over Ogle Burn On Former Military Road 1Km North Of Glenogle Farm				56°23′55″N 4°17′52″W	Category C(S)	4135	Upload Photo
Glen Ogle, Bridge Over Ogle Burn On Former Military Road Near Parish Boundary				56°25′01″N 4°19′44″W	Category C(S)	4142	Upload Photo
Balquhidder Parish Church And Churchyard				56°21′29″N 4°22′18″W	Category B	4157	Upload Photo
Glen Buckie, Bridge Near Ballimore Farm Over Calair Burn On Road To Immeroin				56°19′36″N 4°22′47″W	Category C(S)	50341	Upload Photo
Calair Bridge Over Calair Burn				56°21′09″N 4°22′06″W	Category C(S)	4190	Upload Photo
Auchtubh, Macgregor Murray Mausoleum With Gatepiers, Gates And Boundary Wall				56°21′21″N 4°20′23″W	Category B	4191	Upload Photo
Edinample Castle With Ancillary Building, Bothy And Garden Walls				56°22′32″N 4°15′56″W	Category A	4198	Upload another image
Glen Ogle, Bridge On A85				56°24′37″N 4°18′46″W	Category C(S)	4138	Upload Photo
Balquhidder, Creag An Tuirc House				56°21′29″N 4°22′06″W	Category C(S)	49500	Upload Photo
Edinchip Footbridge Over Former Callander And Oban Railway				56°22′25″N 4°18′21″W	Category B	43905	Upload Photo
Strathyre, Tigh-Na-Sheann				56°19′38″N 4°19′58″W	Category C(S)	4193	Upload Photo
Edinchip Viaduct Over Kendrum Burn				56°22′20″N 4°18′29″W	Category B	4196	Upload Photo
Edinample Mausoleum				56°22′25″N 4°15′55″W	Category B	4199	Upload Photo
Glen Ogle, Bridge On A85				56°24′27″N 4°18′29″W	Category C(S)	4137	Upload Photo
Balquhidder, The Library Tea Room				56°21′26″N 4°22′20″W	Category C(S)	50337	Upload Photo
Lochearnhead, Village Shop On A84				56°23′06″N 4°17′15″W	Category C(S)	50344	Upload Photo

== Key ==
The scheme for classifying buildings in Scotland is:

- Category A: "buildings of national or international importance, either architectural or historic; or fine, little-altered examples of some particular period, style or building type."
- Category B: "buildings of regional or more than local importance; or major examples of some particular period, style or building type, which may have been altered."
- Category C: "buildings of local importance; lesser examples of any period, style, or building type, as originally constructed or moderately altered; and simple traditional buildings which group well with other listed buildings."

In March 2016 there were 47,288 listed buildings in Scotland. Of these, 8% were Category A, and 50% were Category B, with the remaining 42% being Category C.
