= List of listed buildings in Aberfoyle, Stirling =

This is a list of listed buildings in the parish of Aberfoyle in Stirling, Scotland.

== List ==
Name	Location	Date listed	Grid ref. (Note: Sometimes known as OSGB36, the grid reference (where provided) is based on the British national grid reference system used by the Ordnance Survey. • "Guide to National Grid". Ordnance Survey. • "Get-a-map". Ordnance Survey.)	Geo-coordinates	Notes	LB number (Note: Historic Environment Scotland assign a unique alphanumeric identifier to each designated site in Scotland, for listed buildings this always begins with "LB", for example "LB12345".)	Image
Achray Farm, Near Bridge Of Michael, Loch Achray				56°13′37″N 4°22′22″W	Category B	6592	Upload Photo
Aberfoyle, Bridge Over River Forth				56°10′40″N 4°23′08″W	Category B	4207	Upload Photo
Brig O'Michael Over Black Water				56°13′38″N 4°22′07″W	Category C(S)	4156	Upload Photo
Aberfoyle, Nos 1, 2, 3 And 4 Station Cottages				56°10′39″N 4°22′44″W	Category C(S)	50291	Upload Photo
Milepost At Nn44618/02702				56°11′29″N 4°30′20″W	Category C(S)	50302	Upload Photo
Aberfoyle, Main Street, Nos 1-6 Inclusive Craiguchty Terrace Including Outhouses				56°10′43″N 4°22′50″W	Category B	4209	Upload Photo
Aberfoyle, Breaval Farmhouse				56°10′22″N 4°21′49″W	Category C(S)	4212	Upload Photo
Milton, The Corn Mill (Formerly Known As Milton Mill)				56°10′53″N 4°24′47″W	Category C(S)	4216	Upload Photo
Dun Dhu (Also Known As Dun Dubh Or Mell Mhor)				56°10′56″N 4°26′46″W	Category C(S)	4219	Upload Photo
Loch Katrine Tunnel Ventilation Shaft Enclosures And Sighting Pillars (former Glasgow Corporation Waterworks)				56°10′37″N 4°30′14″W	Category C(S)	4150	Upload Photo
Loch Arklet Aqueduct Intake Including Railings, Gates And Walls (former Glasgow Corporation Waterworks)				56°15′02″N 4°35′32″W	Category B	50297	Upload Photo
Milepost At Nn41967/06185				56°13′19″N 4°33′01″W	Category C(S)	50301	Upload Photo
Milepost At Nn50481/01369				56°10′53″N 4°24′38″W	Category C(S)	50305	Upload Photo
The Pass Including Gates, Gatepiers And Wing Walls				56°11′02″N 4°25′38″W	Category B	50309	Upload Photo
Aberfoyle, Old Parish Church And Burial Ground Including Boundary Walls, Gatepiers And Gates				56°10′27″N 4°23′17″W	Category B	4206	Upload Photo
Aberfoyle, St Mary's Episcopal Church				56°10′44″N 4°22′47″W	Category C(S)	4208	Upload Photo
Aberfoyle, Lochard Road, Primary School Including Schoolhouse And Boundary Walls				56°10′50″N 4°23′35″W	Category B	4215	Upload Photo
Duchray Valley, Valve House, Also Known As Basin House (former Glasgow Corporation Waterworks)				56°09′50″N 4°28′56″W	Category B	4154	Upload Photo
Tom-An-Eas Aqueduct Bridge Over Duchray Water Including Ventilation Shafts (former Glasgow Corporation Waterworks)				56°10′20″N 4°30′59″W	Category C(S)	50293	Upload Photo
Milepost At Nn40347/08862				56°14′43″N 4°34′41″W	Category C(S)	50299	Upload Photo
Milepost Near Nn47640/01951				56°11′09″N 4°27′24″W	Category C(S)	50306	Upload Photo
Glen Finglas Dam And Hydro-Electric Power Station (former Glasgow Corporation Waterworks)				56°14′27″N 4°22′25″W	Category C(S)	51151	Upload Photo
Loch Katrine, Royal Cottage, Including Outbuildings, Jetty And Boathouse				56°14′50″N 4°32′50″W	Category C(S)	4149	Upload Photo
Couligartan Aqueduct Bridge No 1 (former Glasgow Corporation Waterworks)				56°09′49″N 4°30′51″W	Category A	4151	Upload Photo
Couligartan Aqueduct Bridge No 2 (former Glasgow Corporation Waterworks)				56°10′18″N 4°29′58″W	Category A	4152	Upload Photo
Couligartan Aqueduct Bridge No 3 (former Glasgow Corporation Waterworks)				56°09′28″N 4°27′52″W	Category A	4153	Upload Photo
River Duchray Aqueduct Pipe Bridges (former Glasgow Corporation Waterworks) Including Railings And Gates				56°09′43″N 4°28′34″W	Category A	4155	Upload Photo
Loch Ard, Creag-Ard House (Formerly Known As Craigard), Including Walls, Gates And Dovecot				56°10′59″N 4°25′02″W	Category C(S)	50294	Upload Photo
Loch Katrine, Royal Cottage Aqueduct Intakes Including Retaining Walls And Railings (former Glasgow Corporation Waterworks)				56°14′52″N 4°32′54″W	Category A	50298	Upload Photo
Milepost At Nn49049/01624				56°11′00″N 4°26′01″W	Category C(S)	50304	Upload Photo
Milton Of Aberfoyle, Jean Mcalpine's Inn				56°10′55″N 4°24′47″W	Category B	43026	Upload Photo
Loch Ard, Cuilvona Including Boundary Walls, Gatepiers And Railings				56°11′04″N 4°25′19″W	Category C(S)	50295	Upload Photo
Milton, Corrienessan Coach House Including Boundary Walls, Hand Gate And Cobbled Yard				56°10′54″N 4°24′57″W	Category C(S)	50307	Upload Photo
Stronachlachar, Loch Arklet To Loch Katrine Aqueduct Outlet, Weirs and Water Channel With Railings and Gates (former Glasgow Corporation Waterworks)				56°15′09″N 4°34′41″W	Category B	50308	Upload another image
Clashmore Tunnel Ventilation Shaft Enclosures and Sighting Pillar (former Glasgow Corporation Waterworks)				56°08′36″N 4°26′24″W	Category C(S)	51149	Upload Photo
Dow Of Chon, Loch Chon Aqueduct No 3 (Former Glasgow Corporation Water Works)				56°12′25″N 4°32′47″W	Category C(S)	51284	Upload Photo
Lochard Road, Corrienessan Including Gatepiers And Wingwalls				56°10′56″N 4°25′01″W	Category B	4147	Upload Photo
Aberfoyle, Creag Mhor				56°10′55″N 4°23′58″W	Category C(S)	50288	Upload Photo
Blairuskin Sighting Pillar (former Glasgow Corporation Waterworks)				56°11′29″N 4°31′28″W	Category C(S)	51148	Upload Photo
Aberfoyle, Queen Elizabeth Forest Visitor Centre, David Marshall Lodge And Cottage				56°10′57″N 4°23′09″W	Category B	4210	Upload Photo
Loch Ard, Dundarroch				56°11′00″N 4°25′13″W	Category C(S)	4217	Upload Photo
Aberfoyle, Main Street, A2Z And The Clachan Hotel				56°10′43″N 4°23′01″W	Category B	50129	Upload Photo
Aberfoyle, Main Street And Trossachs Road, The Bank House, Hbos, Trossachs Gate, Basil's, Liz Macgregor's, Photograph Scotland And The Post Office				56°10′44″N 4°23′03″W	Category C(S)	50290	Upload Photo
Milepost At Nn46135/02255				56°11′17″N 4°28′51″W	Category C(S)	50303	Upload Photo
Couligartan Aqueduct Overflow Or Outlet Incorporating Bridge (former Glasgow Corporation Waterworks)				56°10′00″N 4°29′33″W	Category B	51150	Upload Photo
Gartmore Station, Cobleland Bridge Over River Forth				56°09′31″N 4°21′57″W	Category B	4211	Upload Photo
Aberfoyle New Parish Church (Church Of Scotland) Including Bell, War Memorial, Boundary Walls And Gatepiers				56°10′52″N 4°23′42″W	Category B	4214	Upload Photo
Teapot Bridge Over Allt Tairbh				56°11′41″N 4°30′58″W	Category C(S)	4148	Upload Photo
Aberfoyle, Kirkton Cottage Including Boundary Walls				56°10′27″N 4°23′20″W	Category C(S)	50289	Upload Photo
Loch Ard, Ledard Farm, Old Barn				56°11′27″N 4°28′58″W	Category C(S)	50296	Upload Photo
Milepost At Nn41334/07640				56°14′05″N 4°33′41″W	Category C(S)	50300	Upload Photo
Loch Katrine, Achray Dam Including Sluices, Weir, Fish Ladder And Railings (former Glasgow Corporation Waterworks)				56°13′45″N 4°26′16″W	Category C(S)	51285	Upload another image See more images

== Key ==
The scheme for classifying buildings in Scotland is:

- Category A: "buildings of national or international importance, either architectural or historic; or fine, little-altered examples of some particular period, style or building type."
- Category B: "buildings of regional or more than local importance; or major examples of some particular period, style or building type, which may have been altered."
- Category C: "buildings of local importance; lesser examples of any period, style, or building type, as originally constructed or moderately altered; and simple traditional buildings which group well with other listed buildings."

In March 2016 there were 47,288 listed buildings in Scotland. Of these, 8% were Category A, and 50% were Category B, with the remaining 42% being Category C.
