= List of listed buildings in Killin, Stirling =

This is a list of listed buildings in the parish of Killin in Stirling, Scotland.

== List ==
Name	Location	Date Listed	Grid Ref. (Note: Sometimes known as OSGB36, the grid reference (where provided) is based on the British national grid reference system used by the Ordnance Survey. • "Guide to National Grid". Ordnance Survey. • "Get-a-map". Ordnance Survey.)	Geo-coordinates	Notes	LB Number (Note: Historic Environment Scotland assign a unique alphanumeric identifier to each designated site in Scotland, for listed buildings this always begins with "LB", for example "LB12345".)	Image
Killin, Kinnell, Yellow Cottage				56°27′47″N 4°19′05″W	Category C(S)	8279	Upload Photo
Finlarig Castle				56°28′30″N 4°18′54″W	Category B	8285	Upload Photo
Crianlarich, Lochdochart, Lochdochart House, Bridge To East Over River Dochart				56°24′47″N 4°31′47″W	Category B	6715	Upload Photo
Crianlarich, Crianlarich Station, Engine Shed				56°23′22″N 4°37′05″W	Category C(S)	50319	Upload Photo
Kinnell, Kinnell House Steading				56°28′01″N 4°18′34″W	Category B	13679	Upload Photo
Killin, Main Street, Killin And Ardeonaig Parish Church (Church Of Scotland) Including Boundary Walls				56°28′11″N 4°19′02″W	Category B	8248	Upload another image See more images
Killin, Bridge Of Lochay Over River Lochay				56°28′42″N 4°19′26″W	Category B	8261	Upload Photo
Killin, Invertay House, Former Manse, Including Boundary Walls				56°28′14″N 4°19′16″W	Category C(S)	8268	Upload Photo
Breadalbane Mausoleum				56°28′30″N 4°18′52″W	Category C(S)	8286	Upload Photo
Glen Dochart, Near Suie, Macnabs Of Innishewan Burial Enclosure				56°25′12″N 4°26′58″W	Category C(S)	8294	Upload Photo
Tyndrum, Kirkton Farm, St Fillan's Graveyard				56°25′10″N 4°39′40″W	Category C(S)	8297	Upload Photo
Crianlarich, War Memorial				56°23′35″N 4°37′08″W	Category C(S)	50321	Upload Photo
Killin, James Stewart Memorial Including Railings				56°28′11″N 4°19′04″W	Category C(S)	50327	Upload another image See more images
Killin, Larachbeag, Station House And Tarmachan Teashop				56°28′07″N 4°19′00″W	Category C(S)	50329	Upload Photo
Tyndrum, Cononish House Including Byre To Rear And Boundary Walls				56°25′02″N 4°45′15″W	Category B	50334	Upload Photo
Auchlyne, Auchlyne House Walled Garden Including Kennels				56°26′04″N 4°24′57″W	Category C(S)	13678	Upload Photo
Killin, Main Street, Ashlea And Upper Ashlea Including Ancillary Building And Boundary Walls				56°27′56″N 4°19′09″W	Category C(S)	8270	Upload another image
Killin, Island Of Inchbuie (Innis Bhuidhe), Clan Macnab Burial Place Including Screen Wall And Gatepiers				56°27′51″N 4°19′03″W	Category B	8277	Upload another image See more images
Killin, Kinnell, Urn Gatepiers On West Drive (1St Of 4 Pairs)				56°27′47″N 4°19′05″W	Category C(S)	8280	Upload Photo
Inverarnan, Drover's Inn				56°19′42″N 4°43′19″W	Category B	8288	Upload Photo
Tyndrum Upper Railway Station Including Underpass And Former Signal Box				56°26′05″N 4°42′14″W	Category B	8290	Upload Photo
Killin, Main Street, St Fillan's Episcopal Church, Including Gates, Gatepiers And Boundary Walls				56°28′08″N 4°19′00″W	Category C(S)	46364	Upload another image See more images
Auchlyne Bridge Over River Dochart				56°25′33″N 4°25′34″W	Category B	8266	Upload Photo
Killin Parish Church Graveyard To North East Of Church Including Boundary Walls And Gates				56°28′14″N 4°19′00″W	Category C(S)	8267	Upload Photo
Killin, Breadalbane Folklore Centre, Former St Fillan's Mill				56°27′46″N 4°19′16″W	Category B	8274	Upload another image See more images
Killin, Kinnell, Urn Gatepiers On West Drive (2Nd Of 4 Pairs)				56°27′52″N 4°18′57″W	Category C(S)	8278	Upload Photo
Killin, Kinnell House Including Walled Garden And Ancillary Buildings				56°28′00″N 4°18′35″W	Category B	8283	Upload Photo
Crianlarich, Crianlarich Parish Church (Church Of Scotland) Including Gatepiers And Boundary Walls				56°23′31″N 4°37′00″W	Category B	50318	Upload Photo
Killin, Manse Road, Mansefield				56°27′54″N 4°19′14″W	Category C(S)	50332	Upload another image
Killin, Main Street, Masonic Lodge And White House And Manse Brae, Breadalbane Cottage				56°27′54″N 4°19′10″W	Category C(S)	8273	Upload another image
Breadalbane Mausoleum, North Gates				56°28′32″N 4°18′55″W	Category C(S)	8287	Upload Photo
Auchlyne, Auchlyne Farm, Granary				56°26′03″N 4°24′51″W	Category B	50317	Upload Photo
Inverarnan, Glen Falloch Farm, Farmhouse Including Gatepiers				56°20′19″N 4°43′09″W	Category C(S)	50324	Upload Photo
Killin, Main Street, Dreadnought Place Including Ancillary Structure And Boundary Walls				56°28′07″N 4°19′03″W	Category C(S)	50330	Upload another image
Glen Lochay, Moirlanich Longhouse				56°28′39″N 4°20′10″W	Category A	8263	Upload Photo
Auchlyne, Chapel (Caibeal Na Fairge)				56°25′58″N 4°24′46″W	Category C(S)	8265	Upload Photo
Killin, Bridge Of Dochart Over Falls Of Dochart				56°27′47″N 4°19′13″W	Category A	8275	Upload another image See more images
Inverarnan, Glen Falloch Farm, Campbell Burial Enclosure				56°20′20″N 4°43′09″W	Category C(S)	50323	Upload Photo
Auchlyne, Auchlyne House				56°26′02″N 4°24′55″W	Category B	8264	Upload Photo
Inverarnan, Drover's Inn Stables And Steading				56°19′43″N 4°43′21″W	Category C(S)	8289	Upload Photo
Dalrigh, Drochaid Bhan, Bridge Over River Fillan				56°25′21″N 4°41′04″W	Category B	50322	Upload Photo
Inverarnan, Glenfalloch Lodge Including Stable				56°19′55″N 4°43′21″W	Category C(S)	50325	Upload Photo
Killin, Dochart Road, War Memorial				56°27′39″N 4°19′24″W	Category C(S)	50326	Upload Photo
Killin, Main Street, Lynedoch Including Boundary Walls				56°28′01″N 4°19′05″W	Category C(S)	50331	Upload another image
Tyndrum, Strathfillan House, Former Bridge Of Strathfillan Parish Church And Manse, Including Gatepiers And Boundary Walls				56°25′19″N 4°40′42″W	Category B	50335	Upload Photo
Glenlochay House				56°28′56″N 4°20′42″W	Category C(S)	8262	Upload Photo
Killin, Main Street, Glengarry Including Boundary Walls				56°27′55″N 4°19′09″W	Category C(S)	8271	Upload another image
Killin, Main Street, Birchbank Including Boundary Walls				56°27′55″N 4°19′10″W	Category C(S)	8272	Upload another image
Killin, Railway Viaduct Over River Dochart				56°27′55″N 4°18′56″W	Category A	8281	Upload Photo
Killin, Kinnell, Lion Gatepiers On West Drive (3Rd Of 4 Pairs)				56°28′00″N 4°18′43″W	Category C(S)	8282	Upload Photo
Killin, Kinnell, Ball Finial Gatepiers On South Drive (4Th Of 4 Pairs)				56°27′49″N 4°18′20″W	Category C(S)	8284	Upload Photo
Glendochart, Luib Hotel Including Stables				56°25′10″N 4°26′36″W	Category C(S)	8292	Upload Photo
Crianlarich, Lochdochart, Lochdochart House Including Boundary Walls				56°24′48″N 4°32′28″W	Category C(S)	50320	Upload Photo
Killin, Kinnell House, Ice House				56°28′00″N 4°18′14″W	Category C(S)	50328	Upload Photo
To The West Of Auchlyne, Bowachter				56°25′26″N 4°26′17″W	Category C(S)	50333	Upload Photo

== Key ==
The scheme for classifying buildings in Scotland is:

- Category A: "buildings of national or international importance, either architectural or historic; or fine, little-altered examples of some particular period, style or building type."
- Category B: "buildings of regional or more than local importance; or major examples of some particular period, style or building type, which may have been altered."
- Category C: "buildings of local importance; lesser examples of any period, style, or building type, as originally constructed or moderately altered; and simple traditional buildings which group well with other listed buildings."

In March 2016 there were 47,288 listed buildings in Scotland. Of these, 8% were Category A, and 50% were Category B, with the remaining 42% being Category C.
