= List of listed buildings in Balfron, Stirling =

This is a list of listed buildings in the parish of Balfron in Stirling, Scotland.

== List ==
Name	Location	Date Listed	Grid Ref. (Note: Sometimes known as OSGB36, the grid reference (where provided) is based on the British national grid reference system used by the Ordnance Survey. • "Guide to National Grid". Ordnance Survey. • "Get-a-map". Ordnance Survey.)	Geo-coordinates	Notes	LB Number (Note: Historic Environment Scotland assign a unique alphanumeric identifier to each designated site in Scotland, for listed buildings this always begins with "LB", for example "LB12345".)	Image
Gaisland Farm, Farmhouse And Attached Outhouses				56°05′12″N 4°21′39″W	Category B	4205	Upload Photo
Balfron, The Clachan, Clachan House				56°04′25″N 4°20′09″W	Category C(S)	4167	Upload Photo
To South West Of Balafark, Bridge Over Lernock Burn At Ns 6102 8999				56°04′57″N 4°14′05″W	Category C(S)	49005	Upload Photo
Balfron, The Clachan, Drinking Fountain				56°04′25″N 4°20′08″W	Category C(S)	49009	Upload Photo
Balfron, Printers Row, Endrick Cottage				56°03′54″N 4°20′25″W	Category B	49667	Upload Photo
Ballindalloch, Nos 1 And 2 Old Stables And Ballindalloch Cottage				56°04′05″N 4°20′40″W	Category C(S)	49010	Upload Photo
Ballindalloch, South Lodge, Printers' Row, Including Gateway To West And Boundary Wall And Gateposts To South Of Estate				56°03′51″N 4°20′43″W	Category C(S)	49011	Upload Photo
Edinbellie, Former United Presbyterian Church (Barn)				56°04′23″N 4°17′22″W	Category B	4202	Upload Photo
Mains Of Glinn				56°05′33″N 4°11′51″W	Category B	4203	Upload Photo
Balfron, The Clachan, Balfron Church (Church Of Scotland), Including Gatepiers And Boundary Wall				56°04′27″N 4°20′03″W	Category B	4166	Upload Photo
Station Road, 1-4 (Inclusive Nos) The Old Manse				56°04′19″N 4°20′35″W	Category B	4169	Upload Photo
Graystone				56°04′02″N 4°17′04″W	Category C(S)	49014	Upload Photo
To South East Of Graystone, Bridge Over Endrick Water				56°04′02″N 4°17′00″W	Category C(S)	49015	Upload another image See more images
Ballindalloch, Sundial To South Of Ballindalloch				56°04′00″N 4°20′45″W	Category B	4201	Upload Photo
Balfron, Banker's Brae, The Pirn Inn				56°04′10″N 4°19′59″W	Category C(S)	49006	Upload Photo
Balfron, The Clachan, Orchardfield House, Including Gatepiers And Boundary Wall To North And West				56°04′25″N 4°20′06″W	Category B	4168	Upload Photo
Station Road, Walled Garden To North Of 1-4 The Old Manse				56°04′21″N 4°20′35″W	Category C(S)	49017	Upload Photo
Balfron, Dunmore Street, Mansefield				56°04′08″N 4°19′47″W	Category B	45856	Upload Photo
Balfron, Buchanan Street, Milepost At 92 Buchanan Street				56°04′14″N 4°20′12″W	Category C(S)	49007	Upload Photo
Ballindalloch, Walled Garden To West Of Ballindalloch				56°04′01″N 4°20′54″W	Category C(S)	49012	Upload Photo
Endrick Bridge (Over Endrick Water) To South Of Printers Row				56°03′48″N 4°20′43″W	Category C(S)	49013	Upload another image See more images
Kepculloch Road, Milepost To North Of Tombrake Farm At Ns 5469 9032				56°05′01″N 4°20′12″W	Category C(S)	49016	Upload Photo

== Key ==
The scheme for classifying buildings in Scotland is:

- Category A: "buildings of national or international importance, either architectural or historic; or fine, little-altered examples of some particular period, style or building type."
- Category B: "buildings of regional or more than local importance; or major examples of some particular period, style or building type, which may have been altered."
- Category C: "buildings of local importance; lesser examples of any period, style, or building type, as originally constructed or moderately altered; and simple traditional buildings which group well with other listed buildings."

In March 2016 there were 47,288 listed buildings in Scotland. Of these, 8% were Category A, and 50% were Category B, with the remaining 42% being Category C.
