= List of listed buildings in St Ninians, Stirling =

This is a list of listed buildings in the parish of St. Ninians in Stirling, Scotland.

== List ==
Name	Location	Date Listed	Grid Ref. (Note: Sometimes known as OSGB36, the grid reference (where provided) is based on the British national grid reference system used by the Ordnance Survey. • "Guide to National Grid". Ordnance Survey. • "Get-a-map". Ordnance Survey.)	Geo-coordinates	Notes	LB Number (Note: Historic Environment Scotland assign a unique alphanumeric identifier to each designated site in Scotland, for listed buildings this always begins with "LB", for example "LB12345".)	Image
Buckieburn Church				56°02′35″N 4°00′19″W	Category B	15272	Upload Photo
Bruce's Castle				56°04′10″N 3°50′15″W	Category B	15284	Upload Photo
Cambusbarron, North Third Water Filter Plant, Former Water Pump House				56°05′11″N 3°59′55″W	Category B	50839	Upload Photo
Fallin, Polmaise Estate, Benny's Bridge				56°06′31″N 3°52′37″W	Category C(S)	44927	Upload Photo
Nos 9, 11, 13 And 15 The Brae, Bannockburn				56°05′29″N 3°55′01″W	Category B	15273	Upload Photo
No 19 The Brae, Bannockburn				56°05′29″N 3°55′02″W	Category B	15274	Upload Photo
Plean House				56°03′30″N 3°52′51″W	Category C(S)	15281	Upload Photo
The Old School House Coal Wynd Bannockburn				56°05′26″N 3°55′01″W	Category B	15286	Upload Photo
Our Lady And St Ninian's Rc Church And Presbytery Quakerfield Road, Bannockburn				56°05′24″N 3°54′35″W	Category C(S)	15289	Upload Photo
Seton Lodge				56°06′52″N 4°00′21″W	Category B	15297	Upload Photo
Borrowmeadow				56°07′22″N 3°54′42″W	Category B	13860	Upload Photo
Howietoun Fishery, Sauchiemill, Former Mill				56°04′20″N 3°57′03″W	Category B	49463	Upload another image
Milnholm Hatchery				56°03′59″N 3°57′16″W	Category A	15275	Upload Photo
Nos 42/50 Main Street And 1, 3, 5, 7 The Brae, Bannockburn				56°05′28″N 3°55′00″W	Category B	15290	Upload Photo
Dovecot, Old Sauchie				56°04′29″N 3°57′35″W	Category B	15300	Upload Photo
Sundial				56°03′51″N 3°55′51″W	Category B	15304	Upload Photo
Muirmill By Carron Bridge				56°01′52″N 4°02′33″W	Category B	15307	Upload Photo
Bannockburn 33 Main Street Former James Wilson Academy				56°05′27″N 3°54′52″W	Category B	15309	Upload another image
Sundial				56°04′49″N 3°58′20″W	Category B	15301	Upload Photo
Milnholm Hatchery, Footbridge Over Loch Coulter Burn				56°03′59″N 3°57′17″W	Category C(S)	15276	Upload Photo
Stables, Plean House				56°03′27″N 3°53′01″W	Category C(S)	15282	Upload Photo
Stewarthall Stableyard				56°06′50″N 3°53′16″W	Category C(S)	15283	Upload Photo
"New Road" Bridge, Bannockburn				56°05′32″N 3°54′55″W	Category B	15287	Upload another image
Old Bridge, Bannockburn				56°05′31″N 3°55′05″W	Category B	15292	Upload another image
Sundial				56°04′53″N 3°58′19″W	Category B	15302	Upload Photo
Whins Of Milton, Milton Grove, Milton Mill Including Water Wheel, Internal Workings And Lade				56°05′15″N 3°55′40″W	Category B	50157	Upload Photo
Bannockburn House				56°04′40″N 3°54′55″W	Category A	15277	Upload another image
Plean (farmhouse)				56°04′22″N 3°52′50″W	Category C(S)	15280	Upload Photo
William Simpson's Home And Walled Garden, Plean				56°03′32″N 3°51′55″W	Category B	15285	Upload Photo
Craigforth House				56°07′51″N 3°58′23″W	Category B	15294	Upload Photo
Auchenbowie House				56°03′52″N 3°55′52″W	Category A	15303	Upload Photo
Bannockburn, 1A Main Street				56°05′26″N 3°54′48″W	Category C(S)	13861	Upload Photo
Fallin, Polmaise Estate, Bridge At Ns 8337 9218				56°06′29″N 3°52′37″W	Category B	44928	Upload Photo
Royal George Mill, Bannockburn				56°05′32″N 3°54′57″W	Category B	19737	Upload another image
Allan Church Bannockburn				56°05′28″N 3°54′50″W	Category B	15271	Upload Photo
Lochend Farm				56°02′47″N 3°59′39″W	Category C(S)	15288	Upload Photo
Touch House (Mrs Buchanan)				56°06′40″N 4°00′23″W	Category A	15295	Upload Photo
Gartur House				56°06′21″N 3°59′19″W	Category B	15298	Upload Photo
Old Sauchie				56°04′21″N 3°57′47″W	Category B	15299	Upload Photo
Bannockburn 9 New Road, View Vale				56°05′29″N 3°54′52″W	Category B	15310	Upload another image
Plean Tower				56°03′42″N 3°50′55″W	Category B	13859	Upload another image
Cambusbarron, Hayford Mills				56°06′45″N 3°58′16″W	Category A	19117	Upload Photo
Cambusbarron, Hayford House				56°06′48″N 3°58′10″W	Category B	19118	Upload Photo
Gatepiers, Bannockburn House				56°04′43″N 3°54′55″W	Category B	15279	Upload Photo
Dovecot, Touch				56°06′48″N 4°00′30″W	Category B	15296	Upload Photo
Fallin Wooden Railway Bridge				56°06′17″N 3°53′03″W	Category B	15308	Upload Photo
Dovecot, Bannockburn House				56°04′44″N 3°54′43″W	Category B	15278	Upload Photo
Old Bridge Chartershall				56°05′23″N 3°56′32″W	Category B	15305	Upload another image
Howietoun Fishery				56°04′22″N 3°57′12″W	Category A	15306	Upload Photo
Bannockburn, Rotunda, Memorial Cairn, Flagpole And Statue Of King Robert I				56°05′38″N 3°56′19″W	Category A	49860	Upload another image

== Key ==
The scheme for classifying buildings in Scotland is:

- Category A: "buildings of national or international importance, either architectural or historic; or fine, little-altered examples of some particular period, style or building type."
- Category B: "buildings of regional or more than local importance; or major examples of some particular period, style or building type, which may have been altered."
- Category C: "buildings of local importance; lesser examples of any period, style, or building type, as originally constructed or moderately altered; and simple traditional buildings which group well with other listed buildings."

In March 2016 there were 47,288 listed buildings in Scotland. Of these, 8% were Category A, and 50% were Category B, with the remaining 42% being Category C.
