= List of listed buildings in Logie, Stirling =

This is a list of listed buildings in the parish of Logie in Stirling, Scotland.

== List ==
Name	Location	Date Listed	Grid Ref. (Note: Sometimes known as OSGB36, the grid reference (where provided) is based on the British national grid reference system used by the Ordnance Survey. • "Guide to National Grid". Ordnance Survey. • "Get-a-map". Ordnance Survey.)	Geo-coordinates	Notes	LB Number (Note: Historic Environment Scotland assign a unique alphanumeric identifier to each designated site in Scotland, for listed buildings this always begins with "LB", for example "LB12345".)	Image
Craigmill Well				56°08′02″N 3°54′23″W	Category C(S)	10456	Upload Photo
Stirling University Campus, 2 And 3 Airthrey Castle Yard, Nuffield Staff Houses, Including Boundary Walls				56°08′58″N 3°54′55″W	Category B	51323	Upload Photo
Stirling University Campus, 4 And 5 Airthrey Castle Yard, Nuffield Staff Houses				56°08′59″N 3°54′55″W	Category B	51324	Upload Photo
Gogar House				56°08′41″N 3°52′37″W	Category B	10457	Upload Photo
Powis House				56°08′19″N 3°53′38″W	Category B	10458	Upload Photo
Ivy Cottage				56°09′01″N 3°53′17″W	Category B	10399	Upload Photo
Blairview Cottage Hillside Crowstepps Reading Room. Dunyat, Ivy Cottage				56°09′01″N 3°53′16″W	Category B	10401	Upload Photo
Kirklea Cottage				56°08′58″N 3°53′15″W	Category B	10406	Upload Photo
Struan				56°08′57″N 3°53′13″W	Category B	10409	Upload Photo
Wharry Bridge, Kippenrait Glen				56°10′27″N 3°56′05″W	Category C(S)	10430	Upload Photo
Stirling University Campus, 1 Airthrey Castle Yard, Principal's House				56°08′57″N 3°54′54″W	Category A	51322	Upload Photo
Stirling University Campus, Bridge Over Airthrey Loch				56°08′51″N 3°55′11″W	Category C(S)	51326	Upload Photo
Logie Villa				56°08′51″N 3°54′00″W	Category B	10454	Upload Photo
Dovecot And Stables, Powis House				56°08′20″N 3°53′44″W	Category B	10459	Upload Photo
Sundial, Powis House				56°08′19″N 3°53′44″W	Category B	10460	Upload Photo
Telford House				56°09′01″N 3°53′13″W	Category B	10403	Upload Photo
No 2 Rowanbank				56°09′00″N 3°53′17″W	Category B	10405	Upload Photo
Fenham				56°09′01″N 3°53′07″W	Category B	10411	Upload Photo
Parish Church Logie				56°08′56″N 3°54′17″W	Category B	10451	Upload another image
Ruin Of Old Church And Watch House				56°09′03″N 3°54′32″W	Category B	10452	Upload Photo
Croft House				56°09′00″N 3°53′17″W	Category B	10464	Upload Photo
Blairlogie United Free Church				56°08′57″N 3°53′15″W	Category B	10408	Upload Photo
Stirling University Campus, Airthrey Castle				56°08′54″N 3°54′49″W	Category B	10412	Upload another image
Crossroad Cottages				56°08′47″N 3°54′14″W	Category B	10455	Upload Photo
The Croft				56°09′01″N 3°53′20″W	Category B	10463	Upload Photo
Craigton				56°08′28″N 3°54′48″W	Category B	10429	Upload Photo
Stirling University Campus, 6 And 7 Airthrey Castle Yard, Nuffield Staff Houses				56°08′59″N 3°54′57″W	Category B	51325	Upload Photo
Stirling University Campus, Pathfoot Building				56°08′57″N 3°55′36″W	Category A	51327	Upload Photo
Blairlogie Cottage				56°09′01″N 3°53′24″W	Category B	10462	Upload Photo
Blair House				56°09′00″N 3°53′16″W	Category C(S)	10402	Upload Photo
Blairlogie Park				56°09′00″N 3°52′55″W	Category C(S)	13721	Upload Photo
Stirling University Campus, Garden Cottage				56°09′03″N 3°54′33″W	Category C(S)	10453	Upload Photo
Montana				56°09′01″N 3°53′17″W	Category B	10400	Upload Photo
No 1 Rowanbank				56°09′00″N 3°53′16″W	Category B	10404	Upload Photo
U.F. Manse				56°08′57″N 3°53′15″W	Category B	10407	Upload Photo
Ochil Neuk				56°08′57″N 3°53′11″W	Category B	10410	Upload Photo
Blairlogie Castle				56°09′03″N 3°53′20″W	Category A	10461	Upload Photo
Stirling University Campus, East Lodge, Including Gatepiers And Boundary Walls				56°08′50″N 3°54′22″W	Category B	10428	Upload Photo

== Key ==
The scheme for classifying buildings in Scotland is:

- Category A: "buildings of national or international importance, either architectural or historic; or fine, little-altered examples of some particular period, style or building type."
- Category B: "buildings of regional or more than local importance; or major examples of some particular period, style or building type, which may have been altered."
- Category C: "buildings of local importance; lesser examples of any period, style, or building type, as originally constructed or moderately altered; and simple traditional buildings which group well with other listed buildings."

In March 2016 there were 47,288 listed buildings in Scotland. Of these, 8% were Category A, and 50% were Category B, with the remaining 42% being Category C.
