= List of listed buildings in Bridge of Allan =

This is a list of listed buildings in the parish of Bridge of Allan in Stirling, Scotland.

== List ==
Name	Location	Date Listed	Grid Ref. (Note: Sometimes known as OSGB36, the grid reference (where provided) is based on the British national grid reference system used by the Ordnance Survey. • "Guide to National Grid". Ordnance Survey. • "Get-a-map". Ordnance Survey.)	Geo-coordinates	Notes	LB Number (Note: Historic Environment Scotland assign a unique alphanumeric identifier to each designated site in Scotland, for listed buildings this always begins with "LB", for example "LB12345".)	Image
Kenilworth Road 12				56°09′17″N 3°56′32″W	Category C(S)	22683	Upload Photo
Westerton House Now Off Alexander Drive				56°09′27″N 3°56′50″W	Category B	22709	Upload Photo
Chalton Road 3, 5, 7				56°09′22″N 3°56′27″W	Category C(S)	22597	Upload Photo
Chalton Road 24, 26				56°09′16″N 3°56′15″W	Category B	22617	Upload Photo
Fountain Road 21 Manse				56°09′11″N 3°56′46″W	Category B	22623	Upload Photo
Henderson Street 81, 83				56°09′15″N 3°56′37″W	Category C(S)	22627	Upload Photo
Henderson Street 103 Eagleton Hotel				56°09′14″N 3°56′30″W	Category C(S)	22631	Upload Photo
Henderson Street 107, 109 Southwood And Allangowan				56°09′13″N 3°56′25″W	Category B	22632	Upload Photo
Henderson Street 121 Coneypark				56°09′12″N 3°56′19″W	Category B	22635	Upload Photo
Henderson Street 36-50 (Even Nos) 1-11 Union Street Penzance House				56°09′17″N 3°56′51″W	Category B	22642	Upload Photo
Henderson Street 106, And 2 Melville Place				56°09′13″N 3°56′36″W	Category C(S)	22648	Upload Photo
Henderson Street 110-114 Kelvingrove				56°09′11″N 3°56′30″W	Category B	22650	Upload Photo
Kenilworth Road 5 Ettrick House				56°09′19″N 3°56′30″W	Category C(S)	22662	Upload Photo
Kenilworth Road 9, 11				56°09′17″N 3°56′24″W	Category C(S)	22664	Upload Photo
Kenilworth Road 49				56°09′04″N 3°55′48″W	Category B	22677	Upload Photo
Kenilworth Road 22				56°09′15″N 3°56′23″W	Category C(S)	22688	Upload Photo
Melville Place 1 Fernfield				56°09′12″N 3°56′33″W	Category C(S)	22694	Upload Photo
Union Street 19 And 1 Keir Street				56°09′15″N 3°56′54″W	Category C(S)	22704	Upload Photo
Chalton Road 9, 11				56°09′21″N 3°56′25″W	Category C(S)	22598	Upload Photo
15 Chalton Road, Rowanhurst				56°09′21″N 3°56′23″W	Category C(S)	22599	Upload Photo
Chalton Road 17, 19				56°09′20″N 3°56′21″W	Category C(S)	22600	Upload Photo
Chalton Road 27, 29				56°09′17″N 3°56′10″W	Category C(S)	22604	Upload Photo
Chalton Road 16				56°09′18″N 3°56′21″W	Category C(S)	22614	Upload Photo
Claremont Drive 1, 3 Highfield West				56°09′21″N 3°56′09″W	Category B	22620	Upload Photo
Fountain Road Fountain				56°09′08″N 3°56′52″W	Category B	22624	Upload Photo
Henderson Street 98, 100				56°09′14″N 3°56′40″W	Category C(S)	22646	Upload Photo
Henderson Street 126-132 (Even Nos)				56°09′10″N 3°56′25″W	Category B	22653	Upload Photo
Inverallan Road 3,5				56°09′20″N 3°57′07″W	Category C(S)	22655	Upload Photo
Kenilworth Road 1 And 2 Well Road				56°09′20″N 3°56′35″W	Category C(S)	22660	Upload Photo
Kenilworth Road 19, 21				56°09′14″N 3°56′15″W	Category C(S)	22667	Upload Photo
Kenilworth Road Beacon School For Girls				56°09′00″N 3°55′51″W	Category B	22678	Upload Photo
Kenilworth Road 24 Claremount				56°09′14″N 3°56′21″W	Category C(S)	22689	Upload Photo
Kenilworth Road 26, 28 Coneyhill House Including Lodge And Gatepiers				56°09′13″N 3°56′13″W	Category C(S)	22690	Upload Photo
Sunnylaw Road 1 Former Lodge To Westerton House, Occupant--Reid				56°09′25″N 3°56′40″W	Category C(S)	22700	Upload Photo
Union Street 11				56°09′16″N 3°56′53″W	Category C(S)	22703	Upload Photo
Chalton Road, 2 And 2 Mine Road				56°09′21″N 3°56′30″W	Category B	22611	Upload Photo
Chalton Road 10, 12				56°09′19″N 3°56′26″W	Category C(S)	22612	Upload Photo
Henderson Street 87				56°09′15″N 3°56′35″W	Category C(S)	22628	Upload Photo
Henderson Street 127				56°09′10″N 3°56′15″W	Category C(S)	22637	Upload Photo
Henderson Street 54, 56				56°09′17″N 3°56′50″W	Category C(S)	22644	Upload Photo
Kenilworth Road 17 Iona Lodge				56°09′15″N 3°56′18″W	Category C(S)	22666	Upload Photo
Kenilworth Road 25				56°09′13″N 3°56′10″W	Category C(S)	22669	Upload Photo
Kenilworth Road 29				56°09′11″N 3°56′02″W	Category C(S)	22671	Upload Photo
Abercromby Drive 12				56°09′17″N 3°56′12″W	Category C(S)	22590	Upload Photo
Kenilworth Road 32 Logie Aston				56°09′10″N 3°56′06″W	Category B	22691	Upload Photo
Station Road Old Mill Inverallan				56°09′21″N 3°57′09″W	Category B	22698	Upload Photo
Well Road 3 Tanglin				56°09′21″N 3°56′37″W	Category C(S)	22705	Upload Photo
Chalton Rod 33 Rokeby				56°09′16″N 3°56′05″W	Category C(S)	22606	Upload Photo
Chalton Road 43, 45				56°09′13″N 3°55′57″W	Category B	22609	Upload Photo
Chalton Road 20, 22				56°09′16″N 3°56′17″W	Category B	22616	Upload Photo
Henderson Street 129 Old Manor Hotel				56°09′10″N 3°56′13″W	Category B	22638	Upload Photo
Henderson Street 96 Benarty				56°09′14″N 3°56′41″W	Category C(S)	22645	Upload Photo
Henderson Street 134, 136				56°09′10″N 3°56′23″W	Category C(S)	22654	Upload Photo
Kenilworth Road 39 Airthrey Croft				56°09′07″N 3°55′55″W	Category C(S)	22674	Upload Photo
Kenilworth Road Meadow Park Hotel				56°08′56″N 3°55′49″W	Category B	22679	Upload Photo
52 Henderson Street, With Railings				56°09′17″N 3°56′50″W	Category C(S)	44111	Upload Photo
Kenilworth Road 10				56°09′17″N 3°56′34″W	Category C(S)	22682	Upload Photo
Kenilworth Road 14				56°09′17″N 3°56′31″W	Category B	22684	Upload Photo
Kenilworth Road 16				56°09′16″N 3°56′28″W	Category C(S)	22685	Upload Photo
Logie House (Former Old Manse Of Logie)				56°09′05″N 3°55′39″W	Category B	22693	Upload Photo
Station Road 5 Inverallan House				56°09′19″N 3°57′08″W	Category B	22699	Upload Photo
Allanvale Road 35 And 18 Union Street				56°09′13″N 3°56′58″W	Category C(S)	22595	Upload Photo
Chalton Road 35				56°09′15″N 3°56′01″W	Category C(S)	22607	Upload Photo
Henderson Street 113, 117, 119				56°09′12″N 3°56′22″W	Category B	22634	Upload Photo
Henderson Street Museum Hall				56°09′08″N 3°56′08″W	Category B	22639	Upload Photo
Henderson Street 34 Westerton Arms				56°09′18″N 3°56′55″W	Category B	22641	Upload Photo
Henderson Street 108				56°09′12″N 3°56′32″W	Category B	22649	Upload Photo
Henderson Street 118-124				56°09′11″N 3°56′28″W	Category B	22652	Upload Photo
Keir Street 7				56°09′15″N 3°56′52″W	Category C(S)	22658	Upload Photo
Keir Street 14, 16 Huntingdon And Thorn House				56°09′11″N 3°56′44″W	Category B	22659	Upload Photo
Kenilworth Road 13, 15 Kilronan				56°09′16″N 3°56′21″W	Category C(S)	22665	Upload Photo
Kenilworth Road 33, 35, 37				56°09′09″N 3°55′58″W	Category C(S)	22673	Upload Photo
Kenilworth Road 8 Kinnoul				56°09′18″N 3°56′35″W	Category C(S)	22681	Upload Photo
Kenilworth Road 20				56°09′15″N 3°56′25″W	Category C(S)	22687	Upload Photo
Kenilworth Road 34				56°09′09″N 3°56′04″W	Category C(S)	22692	Upload Photo
Mine Road 4 Mine House				56°09′26″N 3°56′27″W	Category B	22695	Upload Photo
Union Street 9				56°09′17″N 3°56′53″W	Category C(S)	22702	Upload Photo
Well Road 10, 12				56°09′22″N 3°56′32″W	Category C(S)	22708	Upload Photo
Morven Cottage (Formerly Lodge To Westerton House) Alexander Drive				56°09′21″N 3°56′51″W	Category B	22710	Upload Photo
Allan Water Hotel Well House Well Road				56°09′24″N 3°56′33″W	Category C(S)	22592	Upload Photo
Chalton Road 1 Zetland House				56°09′22″N 3°56′29″W	Category B	22596	Upload Photo
Chalton Road 21				56°09′19″N 3°56′18″W	Category C(S)	22601	Upload Photo
Chalton Road 23				56°09′18″N 3°56′16″W	Category C(S)	22602	Upload Photo
Chalton Road 18				56°09′17″N 3°56′18″W	Category C(S)	22615	Upload Photo
Chalton Road 30A				56°09′15″N 3°56′09″W	Category B	22619	Upload Photo
Henderson Street 95, 97				56°09′14″N 3°56′33″W	Category C(S)	22629	Upload Photo
Keir Street, Bridge Of Allan Parish Church (Formerly Holy Trinity Parish Church), Church Rooms, Hall And Beadle's House				56°09′12″N 3°56′50″W	Category B	22656	Upload Photo
Kenilworth Road 3 And 1 Mine Road Bath House				56°09′19″N 3°56′32″W	Category C(S)	22661	Upload Photo
Orchard House Off Pullar Avenue				56°08′48″N 3°56′32″W	Category C(S)	22697	Upload Photo
Well Road 5, 7, 9				56°09′21″N 3°56′36″W	Category C(S)	22706	Upload Photo
Allan Water Hotel, Well Road				56°09′24″N 3°56′34″W	Category B	22591	Upload Photo
Allanvale Road 27, 29				56°09′14″N 3°56′59″W	Category C(S)	22593	Upload Photo
Allanvale Road 31, 33 And 16 Union Street				56°09′13″N 3°56′58″W	Category C(S)	22594	Upload Photo
Chalton Road 31 Ashcroft				56°09′17″N 3°56′07″W	Category C(S)	22605	Upload Photo
Chalton Road 47 Dalnair				56°09′12″N 3°55′55″W	Category B	22610	Upload Photo
East Lodge (Blairlowan)				56°09′02″N 3°55′32″W	Category B	22622	Upload Photo
Henderson Street 125 Suilven				56°09′11″N 3°56′17″W	Category B	22636	Upload Photo
Henderson Street Clock				56°09′18″N 3°56′54″W	Category C(S)	22640	Upload Photo
Henderson Street Archway To The Avenue				56°09′17″N 3°56′51″W	Category B	22643	Upload Photo
Henderson Street 116 Hunters Lodge Hotel				56°09′11″N 3°56′29″W	Category C(S)	22651	Upload Photo
Kenilworth Road 7				56°09′18″N 3°56′26″W	Category C(S)	22663	Upload Photo
Kenilworth Road 27				56°09′12″N 3°56′05″W	Category C(S)	22670	Upload Photo
Kenilworth Road 31				56°09′10″N 3°56′00″W	Category C(S)	22672	Upload Photo
Kenilworth Road 41, 43 Wellpark				56°09′06″N 3°55′53″W	Category B	22675	Upload Photo
Kenilworth Road 47 Eastwell				56°09′05″N 3°55′50″W	Category B	22676	Upload Photo
15 Abercromby Drive, Uplands				56°09′23″N 3°56′15″W	Category B	22589	Upload Photo
Kenilworth Road 18 Coniston				56°09′16″N 3°56′27″W	Category B	22686	Upload Photo
New Street 10, 12 And 3 Allanvale Road				56°09′19″N 3°57′01″W	Category C(S)	22696	Upload Photo
Sunnylaw Road 2				56°09′21″N 3°56′38″W	Category C(S)	22701	Upload Photo
Well Road 4, 6				56°09′21″N 3°56′34″W	Category B	22707	Upload Photo
Chalton Road 25				56°09′18″N 3°56′15″W	Category C(S)	22603	Upload Photo
Chalton Road 39, 41				56°09′14″N 3°55′59″W	Category C(S)	22608	Upload Photo
Chalton Road 14				56°09′19″N 3°56′23″W	Category C(S)	22613	Upload Photo
Chalton Road 28				56°09′15″N 3°56′13″W	Category B	22618	Upload Photo
Claremont Drive 7 Drumpark House				56°09′20″N 3°56′02″W	Category B	22621	Upload Photo
Henderson Street Royal Hotel (Original Section Only)				56°09′18″N 3°56′47″W	Category C(S)	22625	Upload Photo
Henderson Street Chalmers Church (Church Of Scotland)				56°09′17″N 3°56′38″W	Category B	22626	Upload Photo
Henderson Street 99, 101				56°09′14″N 3°56′32″W	Category C(S)	22630	Upload Photo
Henderson Street 111 Mansefield				56°09′13″N 3°56′24″W	Category B	22633	Upload Photo
Henderson Street 102, 104				56°09′13″N 3°56′38″W	Category C(S)	22647	Upload Photo
Keir Street St Saviour's Episcopal Church				56°09′12″N 3°56′47″W	Category B	22657	Upload Photo
Kenilworth Road 23 And 14 Abercromby Drive				56°09′14″N 3°56′13″W	Category C(S)	22668	Upload Photo
Kenilworth Road 2 Viewforth				56°09′19″N 3°56′36″W	Category C(S)	22680	Upload Photo

== Key ==
The scheme for classifying buildings in Scotland is:

- Category A: "buildings of national or international importance, either architectural or historic; or fine, little-altered examples of some particular period, style or building type."
- Category B: "buildings of regional or more than local importance; or major examples of some particular period, style or building type, which may have been altered."
- Category C: "buildings of local importance; lesser examples of any period, style, or building type, as originally constructed or moderately altered; and simple traditional buildings which group well with other listed buildings."

In March 2016 there were 47,288 listed buildings in Scotland. Of these, 8% were Category A, and 50% were Category B, with the remaining 42% being Category C.
