= List of listed buildings in Port of Menteith, Stirling =

This is a list of listed buildings in the parish of Port of Menteith in Stirling, Scotland.

== List ==
Name	Location	Date Listed	Grid Ref. (Note: Sometimes known as OSGB36, the grid reference (where provided) is based on the British national grid reference system used by the Ordnance Survey. • "Guide to National Grid". Ordnance Survey. • "Get-a-map". Ordnance Survey.)	Geo-coordinates	Notes	LB Number (Note: Historic Environment Scotland assign a unique alphanumeric identifier to each designated site in Scotland, for listed buildings this always begins with "LB", for example "LB12345".)	Image
Gartmore House, Gartartan Lodge Including Boundary Walls, Gatepiers And Gates				56°09′17″N 4°21′49″W	Category B	19707	Upload Photo
Castle Rednock Farmhouse Including Boundary Wall To South, Gatepiers And Gates				56°11′30″N 4°15′25″W	Category C(S)	50403	Upload Photo
Gartmore, Freuchan Lane, Former Schoolroom				56°08′40″N 4°22′54″W	Category C(S)	50407	Upload Photo
Gartmore, Main Street, Thorn Cottage Including Outhouse				56°08′43″N 4°22′47″W	Category C(S)	50411	Upload Photo
Lochend				56°10′07″N 4°16′18″W	Category B	15053	Upload Photo
Gartmore House, Gartmore Village Gate				56°08′49″N 4°22′40″W	Category B	15065	Upload Photo
Rednock House - Walled Garden				56°11′01″N 4°15′15″W	Category B	15070	Upload Photo
Rednock House - Ice House				56°11′02″N 4°15′19″W	Category B	15071	Upload Photo
Cardross Bridge Over River Forth				56°08′51″N 4°15′25″W	Category B	13871	Upload Photo
Malling, Steading Including Horse Mill				56°10′36″N 4°19′03″W	Category B	50420	Upload Photo
Gartmore, The Square, K6 Telephone Kiosk				56°08′42″N 4°22′48″W	Category B	18484	Upload Photo
Port Of Menteith, Churchyard, Graham Of Gartmore Mausoleum				56°10′55″N 4°17′03″W	Category B	15049	Upload Photo
Milton Of Cardross				56°10′06″N 4°15′33″W	Category C(S)	15052	Upload Photo
Gartmore House Including Former Stable Block, Terraces, Boundary Walls And Gatepiers				56°08′53″N 4°22′13″W	Category B	15060	Upload Photo
Brucehill Farmhouse, Steading				56°09′10″N 4°15′29″W	Category B	15082	Upload Photo
Castle Rednock, Estate Saw Mill, Seasoning Shed				56°11′19″N 4°15′25″W	Category B	50138	Upload Photo
Cardross House				56°09′04″N 4°14′52″W	Category A	19708	Upload Photo
Gartur Farmhouse And Steading				56°09′21″N 4°17′57″W	Category C(S)	15056	Upload Photo
Malling, Mill				56°10′40″N 4°19′00″W	Category C(S)	15062	Upload Photo
Gartmore Church (Church Of Scotland) Including Churchyard, Boundary Walls, Gatepiers And Gates				56°08′38″N 4°22′54″W	Category C(S)	15066	Upload Photo
Gartmore, Main Street, Murray House				56°08′43″N 4°22′47″W	Category C(S)	50410	Upload Photo
Rednock House				56°10′51″N 4°15′25″W	Category B	15054	Upload Photo
Dykehead Cottages And Former Library				56°09′10″N 4°15′36″W	Category B	15055	Upload Photo
Rednock House - Stable Block				56°10′56″N 4°15′24″W	Category B	15069	Upload Photo
Lower Tarr Mill - Steading				56°10′45″N 4°12′55″W	Category C(S)	15076	Upload Photo
Finlarich House				56°09′21″N 4°21′49″W	Category C(S)	50405	Upload Photo
Gartmore, The Square, Black Bull Hotel				56°08′40″N 4°22′49″W	Category C(S)	50416	Upload Photo
Over Shannochill				56°09′51″N 4°20′53″W	Category C(S)	50418	Upload Photo
Port Of Menteith, Parish Church (Church Of Scotland) Including Churchyard, Boundary Walls, Gatepiers And Gates				56°10′55″N 4°17′05″W	Category B	15048	Upload Photo
Poldar Bridge Over River Forth At South Flanders				56°08′35″N 4°12′46″W	Category C(S)	15057	Upload Photo
Port Of Menteith, The Toll House				56°11′06″N 4°17′06″W	Category C(S)	15073	Upload Photo
Lower Tarr Mill - Farmhouse				56°10′44″N 4°12′55″W	Category C(S)	15077	Upload Photo
Gartmore House, Gartartan Home Farm Steading				56°09′16″N 4°21′44″W	Category C(S)	13872	Upload Photo
Gartmore House, Gartartan House (Formerly Gartartan Home Farm Farmhouse)				56°09′14″N 4°21′41″W	Category C(S)	13873	Upload Photo
Port Of Menteith, Milepost At Nn 58524 01516				56°11′07″N 4°16′52″W	Category C(S)	50421	Upload Photo
Portend Farmhouse				56°10′55″N 4°18′05″W	Category C(S)	50423	Upload Photo
Port Of Menteith, Menteith House (Former Manse) Gatepiers And Gates				56°11′03″N 4°17′04″W	Category C(S)	15050	Upload Photo
Gartmore House, Burial Enclosure				56°08′47″N 4°22′14″W	Category C(S)	15061	Upload Photo
Auchyle Farmhouse				56°11′12″N 4°16′21″W	Category C(S)	15075	Upload Photo
Easter Tarr				56°10′47″N 4°12′01″W	Category C(S)	15078	Upload Photo
Cardross House - Stable Block				56°09′11″N 4°14′45″W	Category B	15079	Upload Photo
Cardross House - Graveyard				56°09′09″N 4°14′15″W	Category C(S)	15081	Upload Photo
Gartmore, Cayzer Family Private Cemetery, Sundial				56°08′39″N 4°22′56″W	Category A	50406	Upload Photo
Gartmore, Main Street, Ardvulan				56°08′37″N 4°22′55″W	Category C(S)	50408	Upload Photo
Brucehill Farmhouse				56°09′09″N 4°15′28″W	Category B	19709	Upload Photo
Gartmore House, Walled Garden				56°08′59″N 4°22′02″W	Category B	15063	Upload Photo
Blairhoyle Doocot				56°10′57″N 4°14′08″W	Category C(S)	15072	Upload Photo
Cardross House - Walled Garden				56°09′01″N 4°14′53″W	Category C(S)	15080	Upload Photo
Gartmore, Main Street, Culbowie Cottage Including Boundary Wall, Gatepiers And Gate To Nw				56°08′36″N 4°22′54″W	Category C(S)	50409	Upload Photo

== Key ==
The scheme for classifying buildings in Scotland is:

- Category A: "buildings of national or international importance, either architectural or historic; or fine, little-altered examples of some particular period, style or building type."
- Category B: "buildings of regional or more than local importance; or major examples of some particular period, style or building type, which may have been altered."
- Category C: "buildings of local importance; lesser examples of any period, style, or building type, as originally constructed or moderately altered; and simple traditional buildings which group well with other listed buildings."

In March 2016 there were 47,288 listed buildings in Scotland. Of these, 8% were Category A, and 50% were Category B, with the remaining 42% being Category C.
