= List of listed buildings in Fintry, Stirling =

This is a list of listed buildings in the parish of Fintry in Stirling, Scotland.

== List ==
Name	Location	Date Listed	Grid Ref. (Note: Sometimes known as OSGB36, the grid reference (where provided) is based on the British national grid reference system used by the Ordnance Survey. • "Guide to National Grid". Ordnance Survey. • "Get-a-map". Ordnance Survey.)	Geo-coordinates	Notes	LB Number (Note: Historic Environment Scotland assign a unique alphanumeric identifier to each designated site in Scotland, for listed buildings this always begins with "LB", for example "LB12345".)	Image
Low Bridge Of Gonachan				56°02′54″N 4°11′36″W	Category B	10469	Upload Photo
Fintry, Main Street, K6 Telephone Kiosk				56°03′13″N 4°13′31″W	Category B	12513	Upload another image
Culcreuch Castle				56°03′43″N 4°13′03″W	Category A	10467	Upload another image See more images
Parish Church				56°02′56″N 4°12′22″W	Category B	10465	Upload another image
Fintry Bridge				56°03′15″N 4°13′28″W	Category B	10468	Upload Photo
Old Manse (Dunmore Cottage)				56°02′59″N 4°12′25″W	Category B	10466	Upload Photo

== Key ==
The scheme for classifying buildings in Scotland is:

- Category A: "buildings of national or international importance, either architectural or historic; or fine, little-altered examples of some particular period, style or building type."
- Category B: "buildings of regional or more than local importance; or major examples of some particular period, style or building type, which may have been altered."
- Category C: "buildings of local importance; lesser examples of any period, style, or building type, as originally constructed or moderately altered; and simple traditional buildings which group well with other listed buildings."

In March 2016 there were 47,288 listed buildings in Scotland. Of these, 8% were Category A, and 50% were Category B, with the remaining 42% being Category C.
