= List of listed buildings in Kincardine-in-Menteith, Stirling =

This is a list of listed buildings in the parish of Kincardine-in-Menteith in Stirling, Scotland.

== List ==
Name	Location	Date Listed	Grid Ref. (Note: Sometimes known as OSGB36, the grid reference (where provided) is based on the British national grid reference system used by the Ordnance Survey. • "Guide to National Grid". Ordnance Survey. • "Get-a-map". Ordnance Survey.)	Geo-coordinates	Notes	LB Number (Note: Historic Environment Scotland assign a unique alphanumeric identifier to each designated site in Scotland, for listed buildings this always begins with "LB", for example "LB12345".)	Image
Blair Drummond House West Lodge				56°10′06″N 4°03′05″W	Category C(S)	8420	Upload Photo
Blair Drummond House East Lodge				56°09′54″N 4°01′48″W	Category B	8143	Upload Photo
Meiklewood Bridge Over River Forth				56°08′15″N 4°03′00″W	Category C(S)	8147	Upload Photo
Drip Old Bridge - Tollhouse				56°08′14″N 3°58′53″W	Category C(S)	8148	Upload Photo
East Cambusdrenny Farmhouse				56°07′30″N 3°59′52″W	Category C(S)	8150	Upload Photo
Blair Drummond Corner				56°09′46″N 4°03′42″W	Category B	13690	Upload Photo
Kincardine Graveyard				56°09′51″N 4°03′39″W	Category B	8410	Upload Photo
Blair Drummond House Including Terrace With Urns Etc				56°09′59″N 4°02′38″W	Category B	8414	Upload another image
Blair Drummond House - Cottage To S. Of Stables				56°09′59″N 4°02′42″W	Category C(S)	8416	Upload Photo
Mrs. Thomson, Hillview, Thornhill				56°10′25″N 4°09′20″W	Category B	8131	Upload Photo
Norrieston House And Heatherlea Thornhill				56°10′27″N 4°08′35″W	Category C(S)	8139	Upload Photo
East Moss-Side Bridge Over Goodie Water				56°10′01″N 4°10′04″W	Category C(S)	8140	Upload Photo
Blair Drummond House Mill Of Torr, Ruins Of Mill				56°09′56″N 4°01′44″W	Category C(S)	8144	Upload Photo
Inn, Drip Bridge By Stirling				56°08′15″N 3°58′54″W	Category C(S)	8149	Upload Photo
Blair Drummond House - Ice House Approx. 100 Yds. N. Of House				56°10′03″N 4°02′38″W	Category B	8417	Upload Photo
Blair Drummond House - Fountainhead, Approx. 300 Yds. S.W. Of Stable Block				56°09′57″N 4°02′53″W	Category B	8419	Upload Photo
Blairdrummond School, Robertson's Lane, Blairdrummond Moss				56°08′40″N 4°02′02″W	Category B	8146	Upload another image
Barn At Rear Of Menteith House Main Street, Thornhill				56°10′26″N 4°09′02″W	Category C(S)	8135	Upload Photo
37, 39 Main Street Thornhill				56°10′26″N 4°09′00″W	Category C(S)	8136	Upload Photo
Muschet Tombstone, Burnbank				56°09′50″N 4°04′47″W	Category C(S)	8151	Upload Photo
Loch-Hills Cottage				56°09′46″N 4°03′46″W	Category B	8412	Upload Photo
Blair Drummond Corner, Sawmill				56°09′48″N 4°03′44″W	Category C(S)	8413	Upload Photo
Parish Church, Kincardine				56°09′54″N 4°03′51″W	Category A	8431	Upload another image
Kincardine School				56°09′55″N 4°03′54″W	Category C(S)	8432	Upload Photo
Craighead, Farmhouse				56°09′25″N 4°06′47″W	Category C(S)	8130	Upload Photo
Crown Hotel, Main Street, Thornhill				56°10′26″N 4°09′03″W	Category B	8132	Upload another image
Blairhill, Main Street, Thornhill				56°10′28″N 4°08′35″W	Category B	8133	Upload Photo
Blair Drummond House - Store, Approx. 100 Yds. S.W. Of Stable Block				56°09′58″N 4°02′48″W	Category C(S)	8418	Upload Photo
Blair Drummond House Obelisk				56°09′49″N 4°03′18″W	Category B	8422	Upload Photo
Ochtertyre House, Walled Garden				56°09′29″N 4°00′39″W	Category C(S)	8145	Upload Photo
Blair Drummond House - Stables (Part Now Piggeries)				56°10′00″N 4°02′42″W	Category B	8415	Upload Photo
Blairhoyle Masonic Lodge Main Street Thornhill				56°10′25″N 4°09′10″W	Category C(S)	8134	Upload another image
Norrieston Church Thornhill				56°10′28″N 4°08′37″W	Category B	8138	Upload another image
West Moss-Side Farmhouse				56°10′10″N 4°10′40″W	Category B	8141	Upload Photo
Netherton Bridge Over Goodie Water				56°09′45″N 4°09′28″W	Category C(S)	8142	Upload Photo
Bridge Over Carrat Burn (Near Saughs Cottage)				56°08′57″N 4°00′27″W	Category C(S)	48976	Upload Photo
Kincardine Manse (Now Captain Sherriff)				56°09′48″N 4°04′02″W	Category B	8411	Upload Photo
Blair Drummond House Cuthill Brae Cottage				56°10′07″N 4°03′10″W	Category C(S)	8421	Upload Photo
Drip Old Bridge Over River Forth				56°08′14″N 3°58′50″W	Category A	6725	Upload another image

== Key ==
The scheme for classifying buildings in Scotland is:

- Category A: "buildings of national or international importance, either architectural or historic; or fine, little-altered examples of some particular period, style or building type."
- Category B: "buildings of regional or more than local importance; or major examples of some particular period, style or building type, which may have been altered."
- Category C: "buildings of local importance; lesser examples of any period, style, or building type, as originally constructed or moderately altered; and simple traditional buildings which group well with other listed buildings."

In March 2016 there were 47,288 listed buildings in Scotland. Of these, 8% were Category A, and 50% were Category B, with the remaining 42% being Category C.
