= List of listed buildings in Doune, Stirling =

This is a list of listed buildings in the parish of Doune in Stirling, Scotland.

== List ==
| Name | Location | Date listed | Geo-coordinates | Notes | Category | LB number | Image |
|---|---|---|---|---|---|---|---|
| 23 29 Balkerach Street | | | 56°11′26″N 4°03′13″W | | C(S) | 24661 | Upload Photo |
| 43 Balkerach Street Gospel Hall | | | 56°11′25″N 4°03′11″W | | C(S) | 24664 | Upload Photo |
| Cairnryan (Formerly Violet Bank) Bank Street | | | 56°11′24″N 4°03′16″W | | B | 24666 | Upload Photo |
| Castlebank Cottage | | | 56°11′09″N 4°03′04″W | | B | 24670 | Upload Photo |
| Cross House The Cross | | | 56°11′22″N 4°03′11″W | | B | 24672 | Upload Photo |
| 13, 15 Main Street | | | 56°11′22″N 4°03′07″W | | C(S) | 24689 | Upload Photo |
| 31, 33 Main Street | | | 56°11′22″N 4°03′05″W | | C(S) | 24692 | Upload Photo |
| 43 Main Street | | | 56°11′22″N 4°03′03″W | | C(S) | 24696 | Upload Photo |
| 71 Main Street | | | 56°11′20″N 4°02′56″W | | B | 24703 | Upload Photo |
| 28-34 (Even) Main Street | | | 56°11′21″N 4°03′06″W | | B | 24708 | Upload Photo |
| 60, 62, 64 Main Street | | | 56°11′21″N 4°03′02″W | | C(S) | 24711 | Upload Photo |
| 68 Main Street | | | 56°11′20″N 4°03′00″W | | C(S) | 24713 | Upload Photo |
| D M Macfarlane And P H Kemp, The Cross | | | 56°11′22″N 4°03′10″W | | C(S) | 24673 | Upload Photo |
| Castle Keeper's Cottage Doune Castle | | | 56°11′10″N 4°03′02″W | | B | 24676 | Upload another image |
| Moray Institute George Street | | | 56°11′23″N 4°03′15″W | | C(S) | 24679 | Upload Photo |
| Structure At Rear Of 35 Main Street | | | 56°11′22″N 4°03′05″W | | B | 24694 | Upload Photo |
| 41 Main Street | | | 56°11′22″N 4°03′03″W | | C(S) | 24695 | Upload Photo |
| 57 Main Street | | | 56°11′21″N 4°02′59″W | | C(S) | 24699 | Upload Photo |
| 63, 65, 67 Main Street | | | 56°11′20″N 4°02′58″W | | B | 24701 | Upload Photo |
| 74, 76 Main Street | | | 56°11′20″N 4°02′58″W | | C(S) | 24714 | Upload Photo |
| 52 Main Street | | | 56°11′21″N 4°03′02″W | | B | 43845 | Upload Photo |
| 32, 34 Balkerach Street | | | 56°11′25″N 4°03′13″W | | C(S) | 24656 | Upload Photo |
| Stafford House 21 Balkerach Street | | | 56°11′26″N 4°03′14″W | | C(S) | 24660 | Upload Photo |
| Bridge Of Ardoch (Old) | | | 56°11′14″N 4°02′53″W | | A | 24667 | Upload Photo |
| 11, 13, 15 (Woodlands) 17, 21 King Street | | | 56°11′22″N 4°02′58″W | | C(S) | 24684 | Upload Photo |
| 3, 5, Main Street | | | 56°11′23″N 4°03′08″W | | C(S) | 24687 | Upload Photo |
| 66 Main Street | | | 56°11′20″N 4°03′01″W | | C(S) | 24712 | Upload Photo |
| The Station House Balkerach Street | | | 56°11′29″N 4°03′22″W | | C(S) | 24658 | Upload Photo |
| Kirktonlea Balkerach Street | | | 56°11′28″N 4°03′19″W | | C(S) | 24659 | Upload Photo |
| 7 Main Street | | | 56°11′23″N 4°03′07″W | | C(S) | 24688 | Upload Photo |
| 29 Main Street | | | 56°11′22″N 4°03′05″W | | C(S) | 24691 | Upload Photo |
| 12, 14, 16 And Mile End, Main Street | | | 56°11′21″N 4°03′08″W | | B | 24707 | Upload Photo |
| 56 Main Street | | | 56°11′21″N 4°03′02″W | | C(S) | 43846 | Upload Photo |
| The Red Lion Balkerach Street | | | 56°11′24″N 4°03′11″W | | C(S) | 24657 | Upload Photo |
| 1 Main Street With 8 The Cross | | | 56°11′23″N 4°03′09″W | | B | 24686 | Upload Photo |
| 35, 37, 39 Main Street | | | 56°11′23″N 4°03′04″W | | C(S) | 24693 | Upload Photo |
| 61 Main Street | | | 56°11′21″N 4°02′59″W | | C(S) | 24700 | Upload Photo |
| Byre Hill (Former Manse) Ardochbank | | | 56°11′18″N 4°02′51″W | | B | 24653 | Upload Photo |
| Castle Farm | | | 56°11′12″N 4°02′52″W | | C(S) | 24669 | Upload Photo |
| J M Mackenzie, The Cross | | | 56°11′23″N 4°03′11″W | | C(S) | 24674 | Upload Photo |
| 13 George Street | | | 56°11′23″N 4°03′14″W | | B | 24678 | Upload Photo |
| 4, 6 George Street | | | 56°11′22″N 4°03′12″W | | B | 24680 | Upload Photo |
| Rosebank, Graham Street | | | 56°11′19″N 4°03′12″W | | B | 24683 | Upload Photo |
| Highland Hotel | | | 56°11′22″N 4°03′06″W | | C(S) | 24690 | Upload another image See more images |
| Braehead House 69 Main Street | | | 56°11′20″N 4°02′57″W | | C(S) | 24702 | Upload Photo |
| 41 Balkerach Street | | | 56°11′25″N 4°03′11″W | | B | 24663 | Upload Photo |
| Bridge Of Teith | | | 56°11′12″N 4°03′41″W | | A | 24668 | Upload another image |
| 1-11 George Street | | | 56°11′23″N 4°03′13″W | | B | 24677 | Upload Photo |
| St Madoc's Episcopal Church George Street | | | 56°11′21″N 4°03′19″W | | B | 24682 | Upload Photo |
| 55 Main Street | | | 56°11′21″N 4°03′00″W | | C(S) | 24698 | Upload Photo |
| 42, 44 Main Street | | | 56°11′21″N 4°03′04″W | | C(S) | 24709 | Upload Photo |
| 46 Main Street | | | 56°11′21″N 4°03′03″W | | B | 24710 | Upload Photo |
| R.C. Church Of Ss Finan And Alphonsus, Main Street | | | 56°11′19″N 4°02′58″W | | C(S) | 24715 | Upload Photo |
| 1 Moray Street | | | 56°11′22″N 4°03′03″W | | C(S) | 24716 | Upload Photo |
| Auchendoun | | | 56°11′15″N 4°03′27″W | | B | 24654 | Upload Photo |
| 16, 18 Balkerach Street | | | 56°11′26″N 4°03′16″W | | C(S) | 24655 | Upload Photo |
| 31, 33 Balkerach Street | | | 56°11′25″N 4°03′12″W | | B | 24662 | Upload Photo |
| 45, 47 Balkerach Street | | | 56°11′25″N 4°03′11″W | | B | 24665 | Upload Photo |
| Market Cross The Cross | | | 56°11′23″N 4°03′10″W | | A | 24671 | Upload Photo |
| 4 (Rainbows End), 6 The Cross | | | 56°11′23″N 4°03′09″W | | C(S) | 24675 | Upload Photo |
| 8 George Street | | | 56°11′22″N 4°03′12″W | | C(S) | 24681 | Upload Photo |
| Old School House, 23 King Street | | | 56°11′22″N 4°02′56″W | | C(S) | 24685 | Upload Photo |
| Kilmadock Parish Church, Main Street | | | 56°11′22″N 4°03′01″W | | B | 24697 | Upload Photo |
| 73 Main Street | | | 56°11′20″N 4°02′55″W | | B | 24704 | Upload Photo |
| 75 Main Street Malt Barns | | | 56°11′19″N 4°02′55″W | | B | 24705 | Upload Photo |
| 4, 6 And 8 Main Street | | | 56°11′22″N 4°03′09″W | | C(S) | 24706 | Upload Photo |

== Key ==
The scheme for classifying buildings in Scotland is:

- Category A: "buildings of national or international importance, either architectural or historic; or fine, little-altered examples of some particular period, style or building type."
- Category B: "buildings of regional or more than local importance; or major examples of some particular period, style or building type, which may have been altered."
- Category C: "buildings of local importance; lesser examples of any period, style, or building type, as originally constructed or moderately altered; and simple traditional buildings which group well with other listed buildings."

In March 2016 there were 47,288 listed buildings in Scotland. Of these, 8% were Category A, and 50% were Category B, with the remaining 42% being Category C.
