= Lecropt =

Lecropt Leac Croit
- Parish
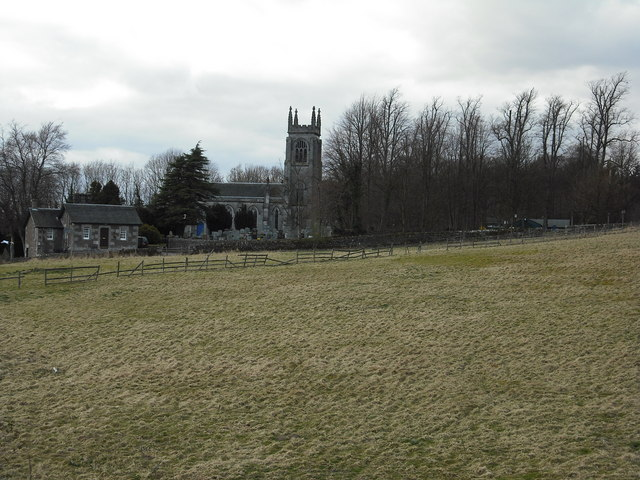
- Lecropt
- Interactive map of Lecropt
- Coordinates: 56.157°N 3.98°W
- Country: Scotland
- Council area: Stirling Council

Population
  - Total: 75

Lecropt (Leac Croit in Gaelic) is a rural parish lying to the west of Bridge of Allan, Scotland.

The population of the parish of Lecropt is estimated to be around 75, consisting entirely of isolated farms and houses, as well as the Keir Estate owned by the landed Stirling family. Lecropt today contains no town or village, though it lies on the outskirts of the village of Bridge of Allan.

== History ==
Historically, Lecropt's population was higher and was as high as 500 around the year 1800. The decline in population over the decades can be explained partly, but not wholly, by rural depopulation. However, in 1800 Bridge of Allan, then a tiny hamlet of no more than 100 people, was included in Lecropt. As Bridge of Allan grew during the 19th century, the whole village was eventually brought under the adjacent parish of Logie, reducing Lecropt's population.

There had also been another village called Lecropt, the site of which was further north-west, on the other side of the line of the M9 motorway from the current parish church. This village hosted the parish church until this was moved to its present site in the early 19th century, on the A9 road. The village of Lecropt itself had been abandoned.

== Geography ==
Historically, about two thirds of this parish were situated within the county of Perth, and one-third in the county of Stirling. Today, Lecropt falls wholly within Stirling Council area. The River Teith bounds it on the south-west, where it meets the Forth and the Allan Water on the east. The southern point is where the Allan falls into the united streams of the other two. From east to west it extends about 3 miles (5 km), and nearly about as much from north to south.

It contains about 2,000 acres (8.1 km^{2}), one-half of which – the southern part – is known as the Carse of Lecropt. The fertile soil of the carse is a rich clay. The other, northern half is upland, or what is generally called dry-field. Much of this consists of the policy lands of Keir House.

The clay soil on the south is divided from the upland by a bank, which crosses the parish almost parallel to the north side, and nearly at one-third of the distance between it and the southern extremity.

The defunct political party Scottish Voice was based here, headquartered at the Keir Estate offices on the Lecropt Kirk-Doune road. The party contested its first election to the Scottish Parliament on 3 May 2007.

Lecropt Kirk (see below) and nearby Lecropt Nursery, which used to be the parish school, stand on the A9 road leading out of Bridge of Allan, north towards Dunblane.

Lecropt was a separate civil parish until 1900, when it was amalgamated into the parish of Dunblane and Lecropt.

== Lecropt Kirk ==
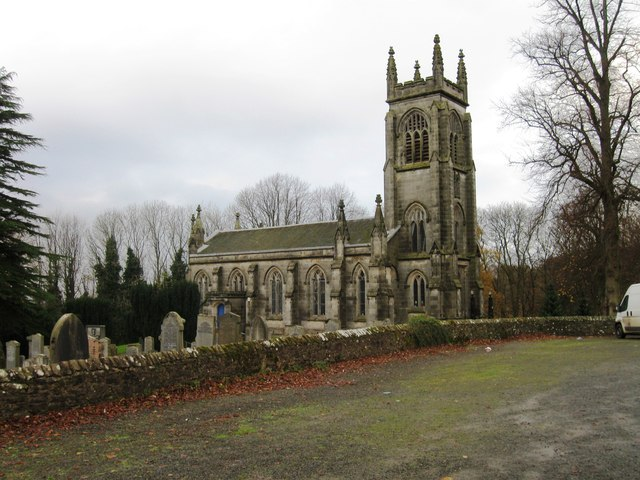
Lecropt Kirk

Lecropt Kirk is a handsome essay in Gothic revival style, built in 1825–7 to the designs of David Hamilton and William Stirling, a local architect. It is a parish church of the Church of Scotland.

Occupying an elevated position overlooking the carse lands, Stirling Castle and the Wallace Monument can be clearly seen from the church grounds and is located about a mile from Bridge of Allan and 3 miles (4.8 km) from Dunblane.

The interior contains in its loft, vaults and monuments the influence of an old landed family, the Stirlings of Keir, built in the age of patronage. This late Georgian church is an early example of its style in Scotland, in company with the other carse Kirks of Kippen and Kincardine in Menteith.

There has been a church at Lecropt prior to 1827, the old kirk was built in 1400 in what is now the Keir estate although nothing remains of the Kirk, except the old graveyard, which lies unloved, overgrown and difficult to access. It is known that there was a church at Lecropt prior to 1260.

Important stained glass by Stephen Adam was added in 1907.

== Famous people from Lecropt ==
- David Stirling, founder of the Special Air Service.
- Archie Stirling, founder and leader of Scottish Voice.

== Locations ==
- Bairnsburn
- Cottonhaugh (historic; abandoned)
- Craigarnhall
- Craigdownings (historic; abandoned)
- Easter Row
- Greenocks
- Heathershot (historic; abandoned)
- Knockhill
- Lecropt Kirk (see above)
- Longleys
- Mid Lecropt: a farm and cottage are situated just west of the M9 motorway, and just south-west of Lecropt Kirk
- Moss Side (historic; abandoned)
- Netherton
- Old Keir
- Park of Keir
- Southland (formerly Deafleys, renamed)
- Steeds
- Westleys

== Transport ==
The parish church, as mentioned above, is on the A9 road just outside Bridge of Allan in the direction of Dunblane.

The M9 motorway passes through the parish. Imposing views of the church towering above the carse lands are to be had when travelling north on this motorway. However, no junction connects the motorway directly to Lecropt, access normally being via Keir roundabout (junction 11 on the M9) or through Bridge of Allan.

Lecropt is in a very central position in Scotland's road network. The A9 leads north to Perth, Inverness and, via the A90, Dundee and Aberdeen. Southwards on the M9 is Edinburgh and, via the M80, Glasgow.

Lecropt is served by Bridge of Allan railway station, which is ¼ mile south east of the church, connecting the parish with Dunblane, Stirling, Edinburgh and Glasgow.
