= List of listed buildings in Callander, Stirling =

This is a list of listed buildings in the parish of Callander in Stirling, Scotland.

== List ==
Name	Location	Date Listed	Grid Ref. (Note: Sometimes known as OSGB36, the grid reference (where provided) is based on the British national grid reference system used by the Ordnance Survey. • "Guide to National Grid". Ordnance Survey. • "Get-a-map". Ordnance Survey.)	Geo-coordinates	Notes	LB Number (Note: Historic Environment Scotland assign a unique alphanumeric identifier to each designated site in Scotland, for listed buildings this always begins with "LB", for example "LB12345".)	Image
Ancaster Square, Rob Roy And Trossachs Visitor Centre (Formerly St. Kessog's Church)				56°14′39″N 4°12′52″W	Category B	22885	Upload Photo
15, 17 And 19 Main Street				56°14′40″N 4°13′00″W	Category C(S)	22893	Upload Photo
Bridgend, Bridgend House Hotel				56°14′33″N 4°13′04″W	Category C(S)	22899	Upload another image
Roman Camp Hotel Walled Garden				56°14′24″N 4°12′29″W	Category C(S)	22907	Upload Photo
Loch Katrine, Portnellan, Macgregor Of Glengyle Burial Ground				56°16′22″N 4°34′34″W	Category C(S)	4066	Upload Photo
Callandrade				56°14′22″N 4°13′27″W	Category C(S)	4014	Upload Photo
Glengyle House Including Boundary Walls And Gatepiers				56°17′09″N 4°36′33″W	Category B	4024	Upload Photo
Ancaster Road, Ach Na Coile Including Boundary Wall, Railings And Gatepiers				56°14′45″N 4°12′50″W	Category C(S)	50361	Upload Photo
10 Ancaster Square (Formerly Lesser St. Kessog's Church Hall)				56°14′39″N 4°12′51″W	Category C(S)	50365	Upload Photo
2, 4 And 6 Bridge Street Including Boundary Wall				56°14′38″N 4°13′00″W	Category C(S)	50382	Upload Photo
Brig O'Turk, Trossachs Primary School And Schoolhouse				56°13′55″N 4°22′01″W	Category C(S)	50396	Upload Photo
Kilmahog, Pass House				56°14′58″N 4°15′27″W	Category C(S)	50398	Upload Photo
Milepost Near Coilantogle Nn 58958 06493				56°13′48″N 4°16′37″W	Category C(S)	50401	Upload Photo
16, 18 And 20 Ancaster Square Including Outbuilding To 20				56°14′37″N 4°12′55″W	Category C(S)	22889	Upload Photo
2 Bridgend, Teithview				56°14′33″N 4°13′03″W	Category C(S)	22898	Upload Photo
1, 2, 3, 4, 5, 6, 7, 8, 9, 10, 11 And 12 Esher Crescent, Scottish Veterans Garden Settlement Including War Memorial To Centre				56°14′24″N 4°11′57″W	Category B	22909	Upload Photo
Leny House Walled Garden Including Outbuilding				56°15′06″N 4°14′31″W	Category B	3980	Upload Photo
Kilmahog Bridge Over Garbh Uisge				56°14′47″N 4°14′52″W	Category B	4021	Upload Photo
South Church Street, Sundial				56°14′32″N 4°12′50″W	Category C(S)	47152	Upload Photo
Glengyle House Steading Including Cobbled Yard				56°17′11″N 4°36′30″W	Category C(S)	48701	Upload Photo
Ancaster Square, War Memorial To South				56°14′37″N 4°12′53″W	Category C(S)	50362	Upload Photo
Leny Feus, Callander Lodge Including Robertson House, Lodge And Stable, Boundary Walls, Gatepiers And Garden Features				56°14′48″N 4°13′47″W	Category B	50383	Upload Photo
24 Ancaster Square				56°14′36″N 4°12′54″W	Category C(S)	22891	Upload Photo
Bridgend, Callander Primary School (Formerly Mclaren High School)				56°14′31″N 4°12′59″W	Category C(S)	22900	Upload Photo
182 Main Street, Roman Camp Gate House Including Boundary Wall, Rustic Arch And Gate				56°14′31″N 4°12′30″W	Category C(S)	22904	Upload Photo
Loch Venachar Dam Including Sluice House, Weir And Fish Ladder (Former Glasgow Corporation Water Works)				56°13′48″N 4°15′48″W	Category A	4060	Upload another image
Invertrossachs House Including Garden Shelter And Small Enclosed Garden, Tennis Pavilion And Kennels				56°12′59″N 4°19′14″W	Category C(S)	4061	Upload Photo
Gart House Including Sunken Formal Garden And Boundary Wall To Nw				56°13′57″N 4°11′39″W	Category C(S)	4018	Upload Photo
Glengyle, Macgregor Of Glengyle Burial Enclosure				56°17′11″N 4°36′36″W	Category C(S)	4023	Upload Photo
8 Ancaster Square				56°14′38″N 4°12′51″W	Category C(S)	50364	Upload Photo
24 Main Street, Kinnell House				56°14′39″N 4°13′01″W	Category C(S)	50385	Upload Photo
91 And 93 Main Street				56°14′36″N 4°12′45″W	Category C(S)	50389	Upload Photo
Milepost At Nn 52832 06470				56°13′41″N 4°22′32″W	Category C(S)	50534	Upload Photo
Leny Road, St Andrew's Episcopal Church Including Hall, Boundary Wall, Railings, Gatepiers And Gates				56°14′43″N 4°13′15″W	Category B	22895	Upload Photo
Brig O'Turk Trossachs Parish Church Including Graveyard, Boundary Walls, Gatepiers And Railings				56°13′45″N 4°23′48″W	Category C(S)	4064	Upload Photo
Leny House Sundial				56°15′06″N 4°14′35″W	Category B	3981	Upload Photo
Little Leny, Buchanan Burial Enclosure And Burial Ground At Confluence Of Eas Gobhain And Garbe Usige				56°14′29″N 4°13′32″W	Category C(S)	4015	Upload Photo
Kilmahog, Woollen Mill				56°14′47″N 4°14′34″W	Category C(S)	4017	Upload Photo
Kilmahog, Shieldaig				56°14′47″N 4°14′28″W	Category C(S)	4019	Upload Photo
North Church Street, Sorisdale Cottage				56°14′39″N 4°12′45″W	Category C(S)	50392	Upload Photo
Loch Katrine, Trossachs Pier				56°14′03″N 4°25′48″W	Category C(S)	50399	Upload Photo
1 Ancaster Square/57 Main Street				56°14′38″N 4°12′54″W	Category C(S)	22886	Upload Photo
Callander Bridge Over River Teith				56°14′35″N 4°13′02″W	Category B	22897	Upload Photo
22 South Church Street, Waterside Cottage And South Church Street, Airlie Cottage Including Boundary Walls				56°14′33″N 4°12′50″W	Category C(S)	22903	Upload Photo
Brig O'Turk				56°13′44″N 4°22′17″W	Category B	4062	Upload Photo
Tigh Mor Trossachs (Former Trossachs Hotel)				56°13′57″N 4°24′07″W	Category B	4065	Upload Photo
Ardchullarie More Including Lodge And Motor House/Kennel/ Byre				56°17′36″N 4°17′17″W	Category B	3983	Upload Photo
Kilmahog Graveyard Including Mort House				56°14′47″N 4°14′46″W	Category C(S)	4020	Upload Photo
Leny House Including Gatepiers And Sundial				56°15′09″N 4°14′22″W	Category B	4022	Upload Photo
38 Main Street (Formerly The Eagle Hotel)				56°14′38″N 4°12′58″W	Category C(S)	50386	Upload Photo
South Church Street, Callander Kirk Hall (Former Free Church School) Including Low Boundary Wall And Piers				56°14′34″N 4°12′46″W	Category C(S)	50393	Upload Photo
Anie Farmhouse				56°15′47″N 4°16′51″W	Category C(S)	50394	Upload Photo
Bochastle Farm				56°14′32″N 4°14′29″W	Category C(S)	50395	Upload Photo
Milepost Near Trossachs Parish Church Nn 51465 06750				56°13′48″N 4°23′51″W	Category C(S)	50400	Upload Photo
3 Ancaster Square				56°14′39″N 4°12′54″W	Category C(S)	22887	Upload Photo
9 Ancaster Square (Formerly 5, 7 And 9)				56°14′39″N 4°12′53″W	Category C(S)	22888	Upload Photo
Bridge Street, Callander Churchyard Including Watch House				56°14′36″N 4°13′03″W	Category C(S)	22896	Upload Photo
20 South Church Street, Waterside House				56°14′33″N 4°12′50″W	Category B	22902	Upload Photo
192 Main Street, Murdiston House Including Retaining Wall And Railing To N				56°14′31″N 4°12′27″W	Category B	22908	Upload Photo
4A And 8A Ancaster Square				56°14′38″N 4°12′50″W	Category C(S)	50363	Upload Photo
26 Ancaster Square				56°14′36″N 4°12′54″W	Category C(S)	50367	Upload Photo
Leny Feus, Trean House				56°14′49″N 4°13′51″W	Category B	50384	Upload Photo
101 Main Street, The Crags Hotel				56°14′35″N 4°12′43″W	Category C(S)	50390	Upload Photo
5 Main Street, The Old Bank (Formerly National Commercial Bank)				56°14′41″N 4°13′03″W	Category C(S)	22894	Upload Photo
Roman Camp Hotel Including Garden Features (Formerly Roman Camp House)				56°14′26″N 4°12′34″W	Category B	22906	Upload Photo
Bridgend, Teithside House Including Low Boundary Wall And Gatepiers To West				56°14′33″N 4°12′59″W	Category C(S)	50376	Upload Photo
Mansfield Including Dovecot, Raised Walkway, Gatepier To Ancaster Square And Boundary Walls				56°14′36″N 4°12′58″W	Category C(S)	22892	Upload Photo
South Church Street, Callander Kirk (Formerly St. Bride's Church Of Scotland)				56°14′34″N 4°12′46″W	Category B	22901	Upload Photo
Gartchonzie Bridge Over Eas Gobhain				56°14′11″N 4°15′09″W	Category B	3984	Upload Photo
11 Bridgend, Robertson House (Formerly Flowergrove) Including Gate, Gatepier And Boundary Walls To Nw, Sw				56°14′31″N 4°13′01″W	Category C(S)	50377	Upload Photo
170 Main Street Including Boundary Wall To Rear And Gatepiers				56°14′32″N 4°12′32″W	Category C(S)	50387	Upload Photo
35, 36, 37 And 39 Main Street Including 2, 4 And 6 Cross Street (Formerly Ancaster Arms Hotel)				56°14′40″N 4°12′57″W	Category C(S)	50388	Upload Photo
Kilmahog, Bridgend Cottage				56°14′47″N 4°14′55″W	Category C(S)	50397	Upload Photo
Milepost At Pass Of Trossachs Nn 50131 06829				56°13′49″N 4°25′09″W	Category C(S)	50402	Upload Photo

== Key ==
The scheme for classifying buildings in Scotland is:

- Category A: "buildings of national or international importance, either architectural or historic; or fine, little-altered examples of some particular period, style or building type."
- Category B: "buildings of regional or more than local importance; or major examples of some particular period, style or building type, which may have been altered."
- Category C: "buildings of local importance; lesser examples of any period, style, or building type, as originally constructed or moderately altered; and simple traditional buildings which group well with other listed buildings."

In March 2016 there were 47,288 listed buildings in Scotland. Of these, 8% were Category A, and 50% were Category B, with the remaining 42% being Category C.
