= List of listed buildings in Strathblane, Stirling =

This is a list of listed buildings in the parish of Strathblane in Stirling, Scotland.

== List ==
Name	Location	Date listed	Grid ref. (Note: Sometimes known as OSGB36, the grid reference (where provided) is based on the British national grid reference system used by the Ordnance Survey. • "Guide to National Grid". Ordnance Survey. • "Get-a-map". Ordnance Survey.)	Geo-coordinates	Notes	LB number (Note: Historic Environment Scotland assign a unique alphanumeric identifier to each designated site in Scotland, for listed buildings this always begins with "LB", for example "LB12345".)	Image
Mugdock Castle And Chapel				55°57′56″N 4°19′29″W	Category A	15330	Upload another image
Leddrie Green House				55°59′21″N 4°18′06″W	Category B	15335	Upload Photo
Tower, Near Souter Lodge, Mugdock				55°57′49″N 4°18′58″W	Category C(S)	15331	Upload Photo
Ballewan Byewash 1 (former Glasgow Corporation Waterworks)				55°59′59″N 4°19′51″W	Category B	51141	Upload Photo
Ballewan Byewash 3 (former Glasgow Corporation Waterworks)				55°59′50″N 4°19′38″W	Category B	51143	Upload Photo
Townhead Of Auchengillan				55°59′29″N 4°22′32″W	Category B	15333	Upload Photo
Blane Valley Valve Houses Including 1856 Valve House, 1932 Valve House, Ventilation Shaft, Boundary Wall And Gates (former Glasgow Corporation Waterworks)				55°59′28″N 4°19′12″W	Category B	51146	Upload Photo
Spittal Glen, Ballewan Aqueduct Bridge (former Glasgow Corporation Waterworks)				56°00′05″N 4°20′02″W	Category B	51147	Upload Photo
Carbeth Guthrie House				55°59′08″N 4°21′37″W	Category B	19738	Upload Photo
Duntreath Castle				56°00′01″N 4°20′54″W	Category B	15317	Upload Photo
Ballewan House				55°59′56″N 4°20′04″W	Category B	15318	Upload Photo
Ballewan Byewash 2 (former Glasgow Corporation Waterworks)				55°59′57″N 4°19′49″W	Category B	51142	Upload Photo
Blairgar Byewash (former Glasgow Corporation Waterworks)				56°00′50″N 4°21′22″W	Category B	51144	Upload Photo
Blairquhosh Byewash (former Glasgow Corporation Waterworks)				56°00′37″N 4°21′20″W	Category B	51145	Upload Photo
Parish Church				55°59′09″N 4°18′14″W	Category B	15316	Upload Photo
Low Auchengillan				55°59′21″N 4°22′40″W	Category B	15332	Upload Photo
Craigend Stables				55°58′21″N 4°19′51″W	Category B	15334	Upload Photo
Mugdock, Dineiddwg And Front Garden Gate				55°57′42″N 4°18′30″W	Category B	15336	Upload Photo
Mugdock, Dineiddwg, Main Entrance Gate Pier And Gate At West Lodge				55°57′42″N 4°18′30″W	Category B	15337	Upload Photo
Clachan Cottage, Carbeth				55°59′03″N 4°21′23″W	Category C(S)	13849	Upload Photo
Mugdock Country Park, Craigend Castle				55°58′12″N 4°20′00″W	Category C(S)	50821	Upload another image See more images

== Key ==
The scheme for classifying buildings in Scotland is:

- Category A: "buildings of national or international importance, either architectural or historic; or fine, little-altered examples of some particular period, style or building type."
- Category B: "buildings of regional or more than local importance; or major examples of some particular period, style or building type, which may have been altered."
- Category C: "buildings of local importance; lesser examples of any period, style, or building type, as originally constructed or moderately altered; and simple traditional buildings which group well with other listed buildings."

In March 2016 there were 47,288 listed buildings in Scotland. Of these, 8% were Category A, and 50% were Category B, with the remaining 42% being Category C.
