= List of listed buildings in Gargunnock, Stirling =

This is a list of listed buildings in the parish of Gargunnock in Stirling, Scotland.

== List ==
| Name | Location | Date Listed | Grid Ref. (Note: Sometimes known as OSGB36, the grid reference (where provided) is based on the British national grid reference system used by the Ordnance Survey. • "Guide to National Grid". Ordnance Survey. • "Get-a-map". Ordnance Survey.) | Geo-coordinates | Notes | LB Number (Note: Historic Environment Scotland assign a unique alphanumeric identifier to each designated site in Scotland, for listed buildings this always begins with "LB", for example "LB12345".) | Image |
|---|---|---|---|---|---|---|---|
| Sundial, New Leckie | | | | 56°07′34″N 4°06′17″W | Category B | 10447 | Upload Photo |
| Gargunnock Village, Drinking Fountain | | | | 56°07′28″N 4°04′58″W | Category C(S) | 10385 | Upload Photo |
| Trelawney Cottage Glenfoyle Macnair | | | | 56°07′29″N 4°04′57″W | Category B | 10433 | Upload Photo |
| Auldhall | | | | 56°06′56″N 4°09′18″W | Category B | 10444 | Upload Photo |
| Meiklewood | | | | 56°08′11″N 4°02′56″W | Category B | 10449 | Upload Photo |
| Stables, Boquhan | | | | 56°07′51″N 4°08′26″W | Category B | 10442 | Upload Photo |
| Burnton Of Boquhan | | | | 56°07′31″N 4°07′47″W | Category B | 10443 | Upload Photo |
| Stables | | | | 56°08′14″N 4°02′56″W | Category B | 10450 | Upload Photo |
| Parish Church Gargunnock | | | | 56°07′26″N 4°04′54″W | Category B | 10431 | Upload another image |
| The White House | | | | 56°07′28″N 4°04′56″W | Category B | 10434 | Upload Photo |
| Arronlea, And Easter House | | | | 56°07′28″N 4°04′57″W | Category B | 10435 | Upload Photo |
| Gargunnock House | | | | 56°07′33″N 4°04′04″W | Category A | 10438 | Upload another image |
| Sundial, Gargunnock | | | | 56°07′33″N 4°04′06″W | Category B | 10440 | Upload Photo |
| Burnside Cottage | | | | 56°07′29″N 4°05′00″W | Category B | 10436 | Upload Photo |
| Stables, Gargunnock | | | | 56°07′34″N 4°04′08″W | Category B | 10439 | Upload Photo |
| Dovecot, Gargunnock | | | | 56°07′33″N 4°04′10″W | Category B | 10441 | Upload another image |
| The Inn (Mary Isabel Strang) | | | | 56°07′30″N 4°05′03″W | Category B | 10437 | Upload Photo |
| New Leckie House (Old People's Home) | | | | 56°07′34″N 4°06′20″W | Category B | 10448 | Upload Photo |
| Gargunnock Village Old Bridge | | | | 56°07′29″N 4°04′59″W | Category C(S) | 10384 | Upload Photo |
| Dunning House | | | | 56°07′26″N 4°04′49″W | Category B | 10432 | Upload Photo |
| Old Leckie Including Garden Walls | | | | 56°07′37″N 4°06′34″W | Category A | 10445 | Upload Photo |

== Key ==
The scheme for classifying buildings in Scotland is:

- Category A: "buildings of national or international importance, either architectural or historic; or fine, little-altered examples of some particular period, style or building type."
- Category B: "buildings of regional or more than local importance; or major examples of some particular period, style or building type, which may have been altered."
- Category C: "buildings of local importance; lesser examples of any period, style, or building type, as originally constructed or moderately altered; and simple traditional buildings which group well with other listed buildings."

In March 2016 there were 47,288 listed buildings in Scotland. Of these, 8% were Category A, and 50% were Category B, with the remaining 42% being Category C.
