= List of listed buildings in Buchanan, Stirling =

This is a list of listed buildings in the parish of Buchanan in Stirling, Scotland.

== List ==
Name	Location	Date Listed	Grid Ref. (Note: Sometimes known as OSGB36, the grid reference (where provided) is based on the British national grid reference system used by the Ordnance Survey. • "Guide to National Grid". Ordnance Survey. • "Get-a-map". Ordnance Survey.)	Geo-coordinates	Notes	LB Number (Note: Historic Environment Scotland assign a unique alphanumeric identifier to each designated site in Scotland, for listed buildings this always begins with "LB", for example "LB12345".)	Image
Milton Of Buchanan, The Old Schoolhouse				56°04′48″N 4°30′06″W	Category B	4081	Upload Photo
Buchanan Castle Estate, Icehouse, Ns44737/89316				56°04′17″N 4°29′45″W	Category C(S)	4085	Upload Photo
Buchanan Castle Estate, Duchess Bridge Over Doghouse Burn, Ns45575/88850				56°04′11″N 4°28′56″W	Category C(S)	4087	Upload Photo
Milton Of Buchanan, Buchanan Parish Church (Church Of Scotland) Including Graveyard, Boundary Walls Gates And Gatepiers				56°04′51″N 4°30′11″W	Category B	4038	Upload Photo
Meadhonach Burn Aqueduct Bridge Including Ventilation Shafts (Former Glasgow Corporation Water Works)				56°09′50″N 4°30′52″W	Category C(S)	50449	Upload Photo
Buchanan Castle Estate, Bridge (1) Over Mill Burn, Ns46731/88495				56°03′53″N 4°27′48″W	Category C(S)	50455	Upload Photo
Buchanan Castle Estate, Summerhouse And 3 Bridges Along Cascade Walk,				56°04′15″N 4°28′49″W	Category C(S)	50458	Upload Photo
Loch Arklet Dam And Associated Structures Including Valve Towers, Water Channels And Bridge (Former Glasgow Corporation Water Works)				56°14′54″N 4°39′19″W	Category A	50461	Upload Photo
Milton Of Buchanan, Milton Farm, Belltree House And The Stables				56°04′49″N 4°29′59″W	Category B	4079	Upload Photo
Milton Of Buchanan, Westmost Cottage And Eastmost Cottage (Formerly Known As Milton Farm Cottages)				56°04′49″N 4°29′57″W	Category C(S)	4080	Upload Photo
Milton Of Buchanan, The Old Mill (Formerly Known As Buchanan Mill)				56°04′49″N 4°30′02″W	Category C(S)	4082	Upload Photo
Buchanan Castle Estate, The Stables				56°04′05″N 4°28′47″W	Category B	4084	Upload Photo
Buchanan Smithy Cottages, Nos 1-10 Inclusive				56°04′24″N 4°28′13″W	Category C(S)	4086	Upload Photo
Auchmar Including Outbuilding, Gates, Gatepiers And Wing Walls				56°05′20″N 4°30′22″W	Category B	50450	Upload Photo
Blairvockie Farm Including House, Christmas Cottage And Steading				56°08′17″N 4°36′46″W	Category B	50452	Upload Photo
Stronachlachar, Pier Building And Pier Including Revetment Walls And Railings				56°15′28″N 4°34′40″W	Category C(S)	50464	Upload Photo
Stuc-An-T-Sagairt				56°04′39″N 4°29′43″W	Category C(S)	4089	Upload Photo
Inversnaid, The Garrison				56°15′01″N 4°40′01″W	Category C(S)	4040	Upload Photo
Blairvockie Farm, Sheep Dipping Shed And Enclosure Walls				56°08′11″N 4°36′31″W	Category B	50453	Upload Photo
Buchanan Castle Estate, Bridge Over Doghouse Burn, Ns 45308/88798				56°04′01″N 4°29′11″W	Category C(S)	50457	Upload Photo
Cailness Cottage And Steading				56°13′12″N 4°40′29″W	Category C(S)	50459	Upload Photo
Milton Of Buchanan, Creityhall				56°05′02″N 4°29′26″W	Category C(S)	50462	Upload Photo
Balmaha, Nos 1, 2, And 3 Montrose House (Formerly Known As Montrose Home)				56°05′04″N 4°32′18″W	Category C(S)	50451	Upload Photo
Coldrach House And Steading				56°04′41″N 4°27′41″W	Category B	4043	Upload Photo
Buchanan Castle				56°03′56″N 4°28′20″W	Category B	4045	Upload Photo
Rowardennan, Rowardennan Youth Hostel (Formerly Rowardennan Lodge)				56°09′29″N 4°38′37″W	Category C(S)	50463	Upload another image
Buchanan Old House, Including Golf Clubhouse, Flats, Estate Office And Sundial				56°04′02″N 4°28′47″W	Category C(S)	4083	Upload Photo
Balmaha, The Old Manse And Steading				56°05′15″N 4°32′43″W	Category B	4092	Upload Photo
Buchanan Castle Estate, Well House, Ns45869/88850				56°04′03″N 4°28′39″W	Category B	50454	Upload Photo
Buchanan Castle Estate, Bridge (2) Over Mill Burn, Ns 46567/88438				56°03′51″N 4°27′58″W	Category C(S)	50456	Upload Photo
Inversnaid, Garrison Memorial Stone				56°14′59″N 4°40′06″W	Category C(S)	50460	Upload Photo
Buchanan, High Mains, Including Garden Walls				56°04′23″N 4°29′49″W	Category B	4088	Upload Photo
Shalloch (Formerly Known As Manse Of Buchanan) Including Outbuilding And Gatepiers				56°04′59″N 4°30′53″W	Category B	4091	Upload Photo

== Key ==
The scheme for classifying buildings in Scotland is:

- Category A: "buildings of national or international importance, either architectural or historic; or fine, little-altered examples of some particular period, style or building type."
- Category B: "buildings of regional or more than local importance; or major examples of some particular period, style or building type, which may have been altered."
- Category C: "buildings of local importance; lesser examples of any period, style, or building type, as originally constructed or moderately altered; and simple traditional buildings which group well with other listed buildings."

In March 2016 there were 47,288 listed buildings in Scotland. Of these, 8% were Category A, and 50% were Category B, with the remaining 42% being Category C.
