= List of listed buildings in Kilmadock, Stirling =

This is a list of listed buildings in the parish of Kilmadock in Stirling, Scotland.

== List ==
Name	Location	Date Listed	Grid Ref. (Note: Sometimes known as OSGB36, the grid reference (where provided) is based on the British national grid reference system used by the Ordnance Survey. • "Guide to National Grid". Ordnance Survey. • "Get-a-map". Ordnance Survey.)	Geo-coordinates	Notes	LB Number (Note: Historic Environment Scotland assign a unique alphanumeric identifier to each designated site in Scotland, for listed buildings this always begins with "LB", for example "LB12345".)	Image
12-22 Teith Street Deanston Mill Deanston				56°11′26″N 4°04′27″W	Category C(S)	8239	Upload Photo
Cambusmore - Lodge And Gates				56°13′45″N 4°10′30″W	Category B	8241	Upload Photo
Gartincaber House				56°10′30″N 4°05′56″W	Category B	8255	Upload Photo
Daldorn ("Kames" On Map), Farmhouse				56°12′07″N 4°08′48″W	Category B	8218	Upload Photo
Deanston Mill - Deanston Cottages 24-34 Teith Road				56°11′27″N 4°04′28″W	Category C(S)	8235	Upload Photo
Blair Drummond North Lodge ("Chain Lodge")				56°11′07″N 4°03′43″W	Category B	8249	Upload Photo
Lanrick Castle				56°12′09″N 4°07′01″W	Category B	8215	Upload Photo
Argaty Stables				56°12′16″N 4°02′15″W	Category B	8226	Upload Photo
Deanston Lodge, Gates And Wall To B 8032				56°11′11″N 4°03′59″W	Category B	8229	Upload Photo
Deanston Mill, Old Spinning Mill				56°11′23″N 4°04′17″W	Category A	8230	Upload another image
Deanston Mill - Deanston Cottages 2-12 Teith Road				56°11′26″N 4°04′25″W	Category C(S)	8234	Upload Photo
Deanston Mill - Deanston Cottages 36-44 Teith Road				56°11′29″N 4°04′33″W	Category C(S)	8236	Upload Photo
Deanston Mills, Weir				56°11′56″N 4°05′31″W	Category A	47650	Upload Photo
Deanston School Teith Street				56°11′25″N 4°04′24″W	Category C(S)	13674	Upload Photo
Lanrick "Cave"				56°12′14″N 4°07′20″W	Category B	8242	Upload Photo
Lanrick Macgregor Monument				56°12′03″N 4°07′22″W	Category A	8244	Upload Photo
Lanrick South (Main) Lodge				56°11′39″N 4°05′59″W	Category B	8246	Upload Photo
Lanrick North Lodge				56°12′17″N 4°06′50″W	Category C(S)	8247	Upload Photo
Braendam House - Lodge				56°11′29″N 4°10′26″W	Category C(S)	8259	Upload Photo
Easter Coillechat, Old Bridge Over Coillechat Burn				56°12′20″N 4°07′08″W	Category B	8217	Upload Photo
Doune Lodge, Lodge				56°12′08″N 4°05′04″W	Category B	8221	Upload Photo
Doune Garden House, N. Of Walled Garden				56°12′27″N 4°04′42″W	Category B	8224	Upload Photo
Lanrick Kennels				56°12′07″N 4°07′15″W	Category C(S)	8243	Upload Photo
Lanrick Gateway, Approx. 300 Yds. S.E. Of Upper Lanrick				56°11′53″N 4°07′39″W	Category B	8245	Upload Photo
Inverardoch, Mortuary Chapel				56°10′45″N 4°02′25″W	Category C(S)	8252	Upload Photo
Doune Stable Block				56°12′12″N 4°05′08″W	Category A	8220	Upload Photo
Deanston Mill - Deanston Cottages 1-7				56°11′26″N 4°04′22″W	Category C(S)	8232	Upload Photo
Deanston Mill - Deanston Cottages 46-56 Teith Road				56°11′29″N 4°04′35″W	Category C(S)	8237	Upload Photo
Mains Of Inverardoch, Doocot And Part Of Steading Adjoining				56°10′55″N 4°02′07″W	Category B	13677	Upload Photo
Inverardoch, Ruins Of Stables				56°10′58″N 4°02′45″W	Category C(S)	8251	Upload Photo
Row				56°10′12″N 4°01′40″W	Category C(S)	8253	Upload Photo
Hillside Of Row				56°10′28″N 4°00′32″W	Category C(S)	8254	Upload Photo
Gartincaber Tower				56°10′55″N 4°05′59″W	Category B	8256	Upload Photo
Kilmadock, Cottages				56°11′47″N 4°05′07″W	Category B	8214	Upload Photo
Lanrick Stables				56°12′03″N 4°06′45″W	Category B	8216	Upload Photo
Doune Walled Garden				56°12′22″N 4°04′39″W	Category C(S)	8222	Upload Photo
Bridge Over Annet Burn At Bridge Of Campus, Original Section Only				56°12′08″N 4°05′11″W	Category B	8223	Upload Photo
Deanston Mill, Old Weaving Shed				56°11′21″N 4°04′19″W	Category A	8231	Upload Photo
Doune Castle				56°11′07″N 4°03′01″W	Category A	6714	Upload another image
Lanrick Bridge				56°12′10″N 4°06′50″W	Category B	13675	Upload Photo
Bridgend Of Teith				56°11′13″N 4°03′31″W	Category B	13676	Upload Photo
Cambusmore				56°13′45″N 4°10′40″W	Category C(S)	8240	Upload Photo
Braendam House				56°11′27″N 4°11′03″W	Category B	8258	Upload Photo
Argaty House				56°12′14″N 4°02′15″W	Category B	8225	Upload Photo
Deanston Mill - Deanston Cottages 8-11				56°11′27″N 4°04′23″W	Category C(S)	8233	Upload Photo
The Old School Deanston Mill				56°11′24″N 4°04′21″W	Category C(S)	8238	Upload Photo
Wester Broich, Farmhouse				56°11′25″N 4°06′20″W	Category C(S)	13673	Upload Photo
Gartincaber House - Stables				56°10′27″N 4°05′48″W	Category C(S)	8257	Upload Photo
Wester Torrie, Steading				56°12′43″N 4°10′40″W	Category C(S)	8260	Upload Photo
Doune Lodge (Now Known As Doune Park)				56°12′16″N 4°04′50″W	Category B	8219	Upload Photo
Deanston House				56°11′17″N 4°04′26″W	Category B	8228	Upload Photo
Watston				56°10′58″N 4°04′16″W	Category B	8250	Upload Photo
Kilmadock Church (Ruins) And Graveyard				56°11′50″N 4°05′10″W	Category B	8213	Upload Photo
Old Newton House, Doune				56°11′12″N 4°02′44″W	Category A	8227	Upload Photo

== Key ==
The scheme for classifying buildings in Scotland is:

- Category A: "buildings of national or international importance, either architectural or historic; or fine, little-altered examples of some particular period, style or building type."
- Category B: "buildings of regional or more than local importance; or major examples of some particular period, style or building type, which may have been altered."
- Category C: "buildings of local importance; lesser examples of any period, style, or building type, as originally constructed or moderately altered; and simple traditional buildings which group well with other listed buildings."

In March 2016 there were 47,288 listed buildings in Scotland. Of these, 8% were Category A, and 50% were Category B, with the remaining 42% being Category C.
