= List of Category A listed buildings in Stirling =

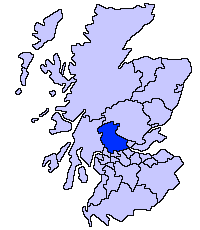
Stirling shown within Scotland

This is a list of Category A listed buildings in the Stirling council area in central Scotland.

In Scotland, the term listed building refers to a building or other structure officially designated as being of "special architectural or historic interest". Category A structures are those considered to be "buildings of national or international importance, either architectural or historic, or fine little-altered examples of some particular period, style or building type." Listing was begun by a provision in the Town and Country Planning (Scotland) Act 1947, and the current legislative basis for listing is the Planning (Listed Buildings and Conservation Areas) (Scotland) Act 1997. The authority for listing rests with Historic Scotland, an executive agency of the Scottish Government, which inherited this role from the Scottish Development Department in 1991. Once listed, severe restrictions are imposed on the modifications allowed to a building's structure or its fittings. Listed building consent must be obtained from local authorities prior to any alteration to such a structure. There are approximately 47,400 listed buildings in Scotland, of which around 8% (some 3,800) are Category A.

The council area of Stirling covers 2,187 square kilometres (844 sq mi), and has a population of around 88,400. There are 84 Category A listed buildings in the area.

== Listed buildings ==
Name	Location	Date listed	Geo-coordinates	Notes	LB number	Image
Lecropt Church	Lecropt, Bridge of Allan		56°09′31″N 3°57′54″W	Gothic Church by William Stirling, 1826	173	Upload another image See more images
Keir House, Home Farm	Bridge of Allan		56°10′14″N 3°58′42″W	Farm buildings by David Bryce, 1832, remodelled by Sir William Stirling-Maxwell, 1861	3918	Upload Photo
Keir House, South Lodge	Bridge of Allan		56°10′07″N 3°58′24″W	Greek Revival lodge by David Hamilton, 1820	3921	Upload Photo
Keir House	Bridge of Allan		56°09′58″N 3°58′58″W	Georgian mansion, extended by David Hamilton in 1831 and Robert Rowand Anderson in 1901	3935	Upload another image See more images
Old Auchentroig	Auchentroig, Buchlyvie		56°06′44″N 4°20′32″W	Laird's house dated 1702, restored by Simpson & Brown 1999	3937	Upload Photo
Queen Victoria School	Dunblane		56°12′03″N 3°57′11″W	Scots Renaissance school by John A. Campbell, 1908	3986	Upload another image See more images
Queen Victoria School Memorial Chapel	Dunblane		56°12′00″N 3°57′10″W	Scots Gothic chapel by John A. Campbell, 1908	3987	Upload Photo
Cromlix House, Sundial and Gatepiers	Kinbuck, Dunblane		56°13′52″N 3°57′59″W	Well preserved 17th-century obelisk type sundial, with 16th-century gatepiers	3997	Upload another image See more images
Loch Venachar Dam/Sluice House including Weir and Water Conduit	Loch Venachar, Callander		56°13′48″N 4°15′48″W	Mid 19th-century dam and water works, built by Glasgow Corporation	4060	Upload another image See more images
Edinample Castle	Lochearnhead		56°22′32″N 4°15′56″W	Z-plan tower house of 1584, remodelled in the late 18th century and renovated in the late 20th century	4198	Upload another image See more images
Drip Old Bridge	Craig Forth, Stirling, over River Forth		56°08′14″N 3°58′50″W	Five-arch stone bridge built circa 1773	6725	Upload Photo
Catter House	Drymen		56°03′08″N 4°27′23″W	Late-18th-century classical house	7628	Upload Photo
Gribloch House	Kippen		56°06′53″N 4°11′17″W	1930s country house by Basil Spence with Perry Duncan	8191	Upload Photo
Doune Stable Block	Doune Park, Doune		56°12′12″N 4°05′08″W	Quadrangular stable block with octagonal steeple dated 1809	8220	Upload Photo
Old Newton House	Doune		56°11′12″N 4°02′44″W	16th- or 17th-century L-plan tower house	8227	Upload Photo
Deanston Mill, Old Spinning Mill	Deanston		56°11′23″N 4°04′17″W	Five-storey textile mill built 1830	8230	Upload another image
Deanston Mill, Old Weaving Shed	Deanston		56°11′21″N 4°04′19″W	Early-19th-century vaulted building	8231	Upload Photo
Lanrick Macgregor Monument	Lanrick, Doune		56°12′03″N 4°07′22″W	Early-19th-century monument in the form of a tree trunk, topped by a classical rotunda	8244	Upload Photo
Bridge of Dochart	Killin, over Falls of Dochart		56°27′47″N 4°19′13″W	Four-arch bridge built 1760 and repaired 1831	8275	Upload another image See more images
Killin Railway Viaduct	Killin, over River Dochart		56°27′55″N 4°18′56″W	Built for the Killin Railway in 1886, the second-oldest mass-concrete railway viaduct in Britain	8281	Upload Photo
Kincardine Parish Church	Kincardine-in-Menteith, Blair Drummond		56°09′54″N 4°03′51″W	Gothic church by Richard Crichton, 1816	8431	Upload another image See more images
Buchanan Monument	Killearn		56°02′38″N 4°22′23″W	Obelisk monument to George Buchanan (1506-1582), erected 1788	10389	Upload another image
Auchenibert	Killearn		56°02′32″N 4°21′36″W	Elizabethan-style Arts and Crafts house by Charles Rennie Mackintosh, 1906	10422	Upload Photo
Gargunnock House	Gargunnock		56°07′33″N 4°04′04″W	Late-16th-century house with 17th- and 18th-century additions	10438	Upload another image
Old Leckie House	Gargunnock		56°07′37″N 4°06′34″W	16th-century laird's house, restored in the 1970s	10445	Upload Photo
Blairlogie Castle	Blairlogie		56°09′03″N 3°53′20″W	16th-century tower house	10461	Upload Photo
Culcreuch Castle	Fintry		56°03′43″N 4°13′03″W	Late medieval tower house and 18th-century mansion	10467	Upload another image See more images
Dun Eaglais	Kippen, Station Road		56°07′40″N 4°10′02″W	Arts and Crafts mansion of 1903 with later additions	12515	Upload Photo
Milnholm Hatchery	Milnholm, Stirling		56°03′59″N 3°57′16″W	19th-century purpose-built fish hatchery	15275	Upload Photo
Bannockburn House	Bannockburn		56°04′40″N 3°54′55″W	17th- or 18th-century country house	15277	Upload Photo
Touch House	Touch, Stirling		56°06′40″N 4°00′23″W	16th-century tower house and 17th-century house, with Georgian facade by William Adam	15295	Upload Photo
Auchenbowie House	Auchenbowie, Stirling	5 September 1973	56°03′52″N 3°55′52″W	17th-century house with 18th- and 19th-century alterations	15303	Upload Photo
Howietoun Fishery	Howietoun, Stirling		56°04′22″N 3°57′12″W	Later 19th-century fish farm with hatchery and pools	15306	Upload Photo
Hayford Mills	Cambusbarron, Stirling		56°06′45″N 3°58′16″W	19th-century textile mills	19117	Upload Photo
Cardross House	Arnprior		56°09′04″N 4°14′52″W	16th-century tower house with 18th- and 19th-century additions	19708	Upload another image
Bridge of Ardoch	Doune, over Ardoch Burn		56°11′14″N 4°02′53″W	Single span stone bridge dated 1735	24667	Upload another image
Bridge of Teith	Doune, over River Teith		56°11′12″N 4°03′41″W	Two-arch bridge of 1535 with 19th-century widening	24668	Upload another image
Doune Market Cross	Doune		56°11′23″N 4°03′10″W	Mercat cross of circa 1620	24671	Upload another image
Dunblane Cathedral	Dunblane		56°11′22″N 3°57′54″W	13th-century church with 12th-century tower, 19th-century restoration by Robert Rowand Anderson	26361	Upload another image See more images
Ault Wharrie	Dunblane, Leewood Road		56°11′08″N 3°56′52″W	Glasgow Style mansion, 1900 by George Walton	26365	Upload Photo
Leighton Library	Dunblane		56°11′19″N 3°57′52″W	17th-century purpose-built library, the oldest in Scotland	26371	Upload another image See more images
Cathedral Museum	Dunblane		56°11′21″N 3°57′51″W	17th-century tenement and former townhouse, altered in the 18th century	26372	Upload another image See more images
Church Of The Holy Rood	Stirling, St John Street		56°07′15″N 3°56′40″W	15th-century church with many later additions and alterations	41083	Upload another image See more images
Church Of The Holy Rood Churchyard	Stirling, St John Street		56°07′17″N 3°56′42″W	Churchyard monuments from 1579 onwards	41084	Upload another image See more images
Holy Trinity Episcopal Church	Stirling, Dumbarton Road		56°07′06″N 3°56′34″W	Gothic church by Robert Rowand Anderson, 1878	41089	Upload another image See more images
St Ninians Old Parish Kirk	Stirling, St Ninians		56°06′09″N 3°56′16″W	Remains of 15th-century church and 18th-century steeple	41095	Upload Photo
St Ninians Old Parish Kirkyard	Stirling, St Ninians		56°06′10″N 3°56′15″W	Churchyard monuments, mainly 17th-century	41096	Upload another image
Athenaeum	Stirling, King Street		56°07′07″N 3°56′19″W	Classical gentlemen's club by William Stirling, 1817	41100	Upload another image
Cowane's Hospital (now Guildhall)	Stirling, St John Street		56°07′14″N 3°56′42″W	17th-century hospital by John Mylne	41101	Upload another image See more images
Stirling Old Town Jail (former Military Prison)	Stirling, St John Street		56°07′12″N 3°56′39″W	Jail by Thomas Brown, 1847, converted to a museum in the 1990s	41104	Upload another image
Stirling Tolbooth	Stirling, Broad Street		56°07′14″N 3°56′34″W	Burgh tolbooth built 1705 to designs by Sir William Bruce, converted to a theatre in 2001 by Richard Murphy	41110	Upload another image See more images
Stirling Town Wall, south boundary of Erskine Marykirk and St John Street Housing Development to Academy Street	Stirling, Back Walk		56°07′05″N 3°56′26″W	Remnant of 16th-century town wall	41111	Upload Photo
Stirling Town Wall and Bastion, boundary of Municipal Buildings, 27-33 Spittal Street and Old High School	Stirling, Back Walk		56°07′06″N 3°56′26″W	Remnant of 16th-century town wall with beehive-shaped bastion	41112	Upload Photo
Stirling Town Wall, Public Library to 16 Dumbarton Road	Stirling		56°07′05″N 3°56′26″W	Remnant of 16th-century town wall	41113	Upload Photo
Wallace Monument	Stirling, Abbey Craig		56°08′20″N 3°55′04″W	Monumental tower by John Thomas Rochead, completed 1869	41118	Upload another image See more images
The Old Town Cemeteries	Stirling, St John Street		56°07′17″N 3°56′42″W	19th- and 20th-century extensions of Holy Rood Churchyard	41126	Upload another image See more images
Stirling Old Bridge	Stirling		56°07′43″N 3°56′12″W	Late-15th- or early-16th-century four-arch bridge	41129	Upload another image See more images
Stirling Railway Station	Stirling		56°07′11″N 3°56′08″W	Station buildings by James Miller, 1915	41131	Upload another image See more images
Stirling Highland Hotel, Old High School	Stirling, Academy Road		56°07′08″N 3°56′32″W	School by J, W H & J M Hay, 1856, extended in 1905 and converted to a hotel in 1990	41133	Upload another image See more images
Stirling Castle, Outer Defences (1708-14)	Stirling		56°07′24″N 3°56′49″W	Early-18th-century artillery defences	41136	Upload another image See more images
Stirling Castle, Forework (1500-1510)	Stirling		56°07′25″N 3°56′50″W	Early-16th-century gatehouse, now much reduced	41137	Upload another image See more images
Stirling Castle Palace (1539-42)	Stirling		56°07′25″N 3°56′53″W	Mid 16th-century Renaissance palace built for King James V	41138	Upload another image See more images
Stirling Castle, Great Hall (1503)	Stirling		56°07′27″N 3°56′52″W	Early-16th-century hall, later used as a barracks and recently restored	41139	Upload another image See more images
Stirling Castle Chapel Royal (1594)	Stirling		56°07′27″N 3°56′54″W	Late-16th-century chapel	41140	Upload another image See more images
Stirling Castle, The Mint (14th-century)	Stirling		56°07′27″N 3°56′51″W	14th-century gatehouse with later extensions	41141	Upload another image See more images
Stirling Castle, Kitchen Range and Grand Battery	Stirling		56°07′26″N 3°56′50″W	Early-18th-century vaulted kitchens, restored 1920s	41142	Upload another image See more images
Stirling Castle, King's Old Building	Stirling		56°07′26″N 3°56′55″W	16th-century range, altered by Robert William Billings, 1855	41143	Upload another image See more images
Stirling Castle, Sundial	Stirling		56°07′28″N 3°56′56″W	17th-century sundial	41144	Upload Photo
Stirling Castle, Regimental Headquarters	Stirling		56°07′26″N 3°56′49″W	18th-century military building	41145	Upload Photo
Erskine Of Gogar's House (Darnley's House)	Stirling, Bow Street		56°07′14″N 3°56′30″W	Late-16th- or early-17th-century tenement house	41239	Upload another image
Moir of Leckie's House	Stirling, Bow Street		56°07′14″N 3°56′28″W	Mid 17th-century town house	41240	Upload Photo
East Section of James Norrie's Lodging	Stirling, Broad Street		56°07′15″N 3°56′34″W	17th-century town house, rebuilt in the 1950s	41246	Upload another image
Argyll Lodging	Stirling, Castle Wynd		56°07′18″N 3°56′37″W	17th-century courtyard-plan town house	41255	Upload another image See more images
Mar's Wark	Stirling, Mar Place		56°07′16″N 3°56′39″W	Remains of 16th-century courtyard town house	41348	Upload another image See more images
Bruce of Auchenbowie's House	Stirling, St John Street		56°07′14″N 3°56′37″W	16th-century town house with later alterations	41464	Upload Photo
John Cowane's House	Stirling, St Mary's Wynd		56°07′20″N 3°56′34″W	Remains of 17th-century town house	41466	Upload Photo
Glengarry Lodge or Darrow Lodging	Stirling, Spittal Street		56°07′11″N 3°56′30″W	17th-century town house, rebuilt in the 1950s	41484	Upload Photo
Deanston Mills, Weir	Deanston		56°11′56″N 4°05′31″W	The largest weir of its type in Scotland, built circa 1827 to power textile mill	47650	Upload Photo
Bannockburn Rotunda, Memorial Cairn, Flagpole and Statue of King Robert I	Bannockburn, Borestone Brae		56°05′38″N 3°56′19″W	Battle of Bannockburn (1314) battlefield memorial with statue by Charles d'Orville Pilkington Jackson	49860	Upload another image See more images
Cayzer Family Private Cemetery, Sundial	Gartmore		56°08′39″N 4°22′56″W	17th-century sandstone obelisk sundial, one of only 25 to survive in Scotland	50406	Upload Photo

== See also ==
- Scheduled monuments in Stirling (council area)
