= James Pearson (minister) =

Dean of Dunblane Cathedral
- In office 1624–16??

Personal life
- Born: 1594
- Died: 1658 (aged 63 or 64)

Religious life
- Religion: Christianity
- School: Church of Scotland

James Pearson (1594–1658) was a minister of the Church of Scotland in the 17th century. He was appointed minister of Dunblane in 1624 and became dean of Dunblane Cathedral. Nine years later, he was given a charter under the Great Seal of the Barony of Kippenross.

Pearson was also the laird of Kippenross.

== Early life and career ==
Pearson was born in Kippenross, Perthshire, in 1594, to Alexander Pearson and Bessie Eistoun.

He graduated from the University of Edinburgh, with a Master of Arts, in 1615.

In 1623, Pearson was appointed minister of Dunblane, and became dean of Dunblane Cathedral the following year.

Pearson lost his job as minister during the overthrow of the episcopacy.

== Personal life ==
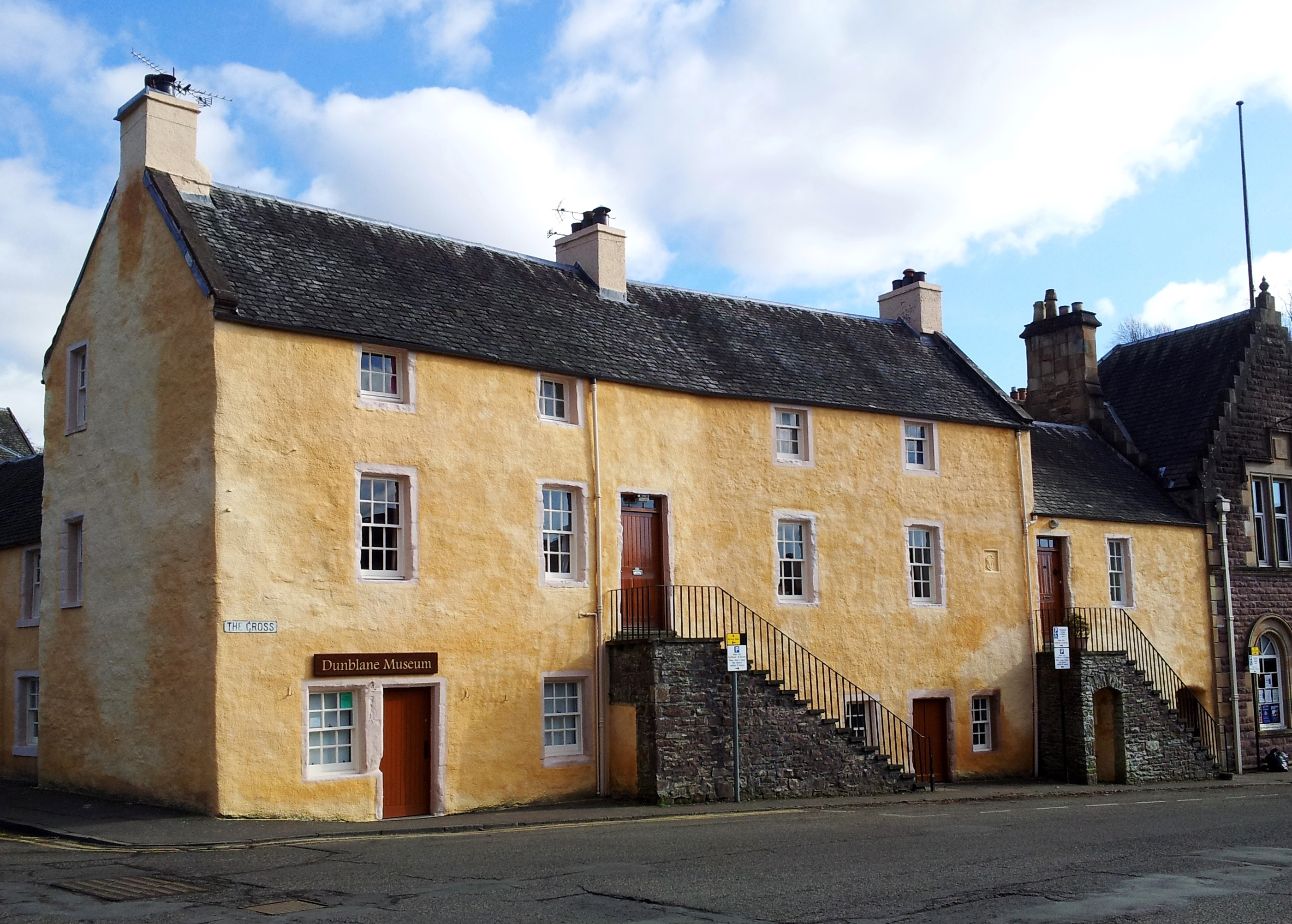
The Dunblane townhouse Pearson built around 1624. It is now the home of Dunblane Museum

Pearson married Jean, daughter of David Drummond of Innermay, with whom he had three sons and a daughter.

Around 1624, Pearson built the townhouse in Dunblane which is now the home of Dunblane Museum. Pearson's initials and the coat-of-arms on the carved plaque are his. The first floor of the main block was likely his townhouse.

His grandson, Hugh, planted the Beech Walk, beside Allan Water at the original 1646 Kippenross House. The Kippenross estate remained in the Pearson family until 1778, when it passed to the Stirlings of Kippendavie.
