= Kinbuck Bridge =

Bridge in Stirling, Scotland

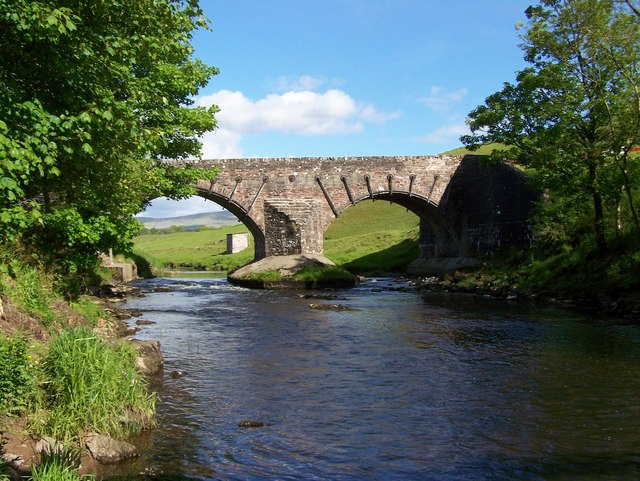
- Coordinates: 56.22560°N 3.95118°W
- Carries: B8033
- Crosses: Allan Water

Characteristics
- Material: Stone
- No. of spans: 2

Listed Building – Category B
- Official name: Kinbuck Bridge Over Allan Water
- Designated: 4 October 1971
- Reference no.: LB3998

Location
- Interactive map of Kinbuck Bridge

Kinbuck Bridge or Bridge of Kinbuck is a category B listed structure in the hamlet of Kinbuck in Stirling.

== History ==
The present structure is dated 1752.

In 1715, after resting for the night in Kinbuck, 6,000 Jacobite troops crossed Kinbuck bridge over the River Allan on their way to fight the Hanoverians at the Battle of Sherrifmuir.

== Design ==
It has two spans, and the central cutwater is protected by a concrete island. The weight limit on the bridge is 10 tonnes (9.8 long tons; 11 short tons).

== See also ==
- List of bridges in Scotland
