= Patrick Stirling =

Patrick Stirling may refer to:

- Patrick Stirling (railway engineer), Scottish railway engineer
- Patrick Stirling (footballer), Scottish footballer
- Patrick James Stirling, Scottish lawyer and author
