= Kinbuck =

Coordinates: 56.2213°N 3.9481°W

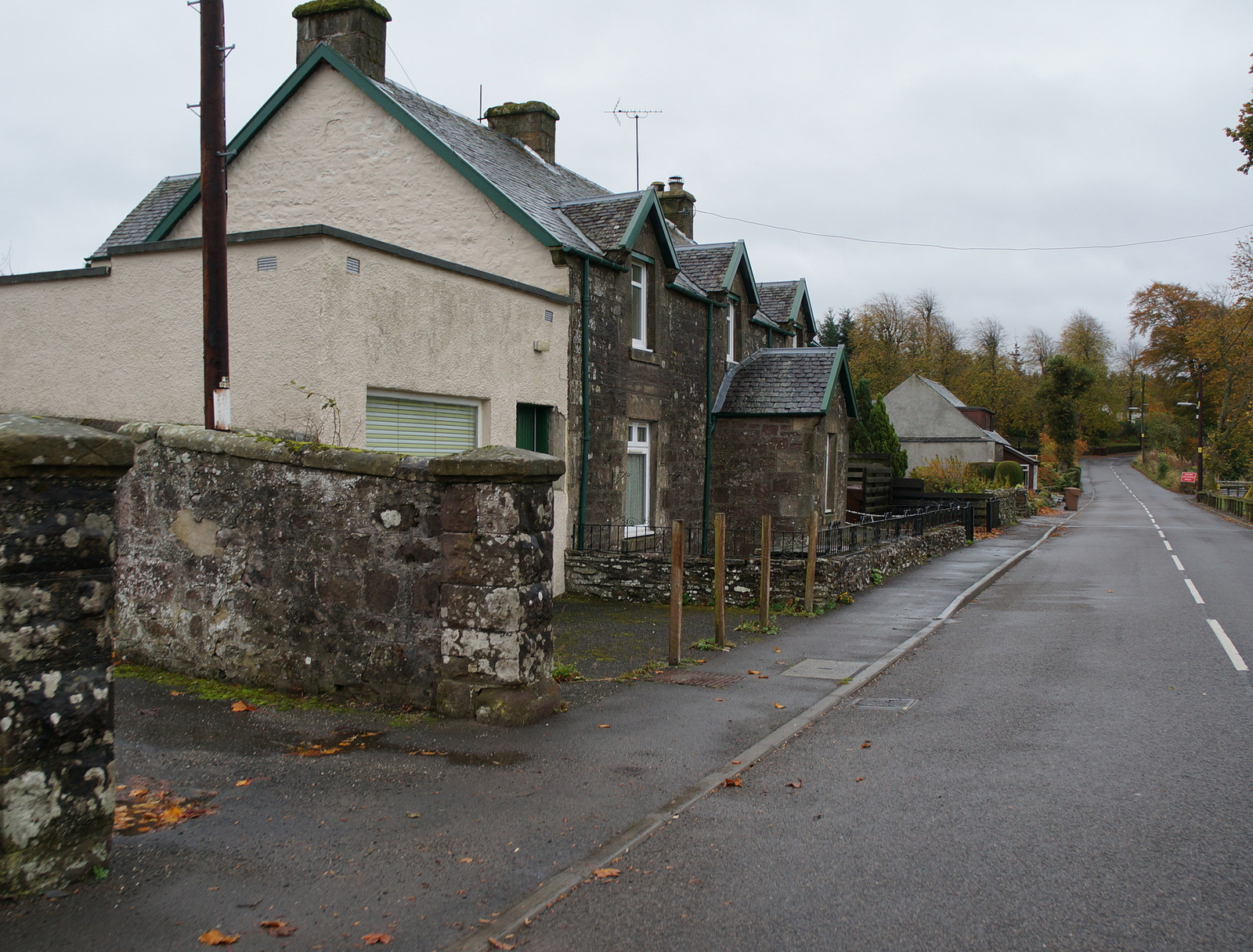
- Houses on the B8033 at Kinbuck

- Location within the Stirling council area
- Population: 114
- OS grid reference: NN793049
- Civil parish: Dunblane and Lecropt
- Council area: Stirling
- Country: Scotland
- Sovereign state: United Kingdom
- Post town: Dunblane
- Postcode district: FK15
- Dialling code: 01786
- Police: Scotland
- Fire: Scottish
- Ambulance: Scottish
- UK Parliament: Stirling and Strathallan
- Scottish Parliament: Clackmannanshire and Dunblane

Kinbuck is a hamlet in Stirlingshire, Scotland. It lies by the Allan Water and the Stirling-Perth Railway line. It is four miles north of Dunblane.

== Education ==
Despite a campaign to save it, Kinbuck Primary School was controversially closed in 1998. At the time its closure was announced the school had just 24 pupils and the action saved the local authority over £30000 annually. Students from the village were then sent to nearby Newton Primary School. The Victorian building remains standing and is now used as the village's community centre, where several events are held annually for all to attend.

== History ==
Kinbuck was the location of the retreat of the Jacobite troops under the Earl of Mar following the Battle of Sheriffmuir on 13 November 1715.

In the 19th century, Kinbuck had a woollen mill, opposite the present day Millbank Road.

Nearby is the B listed Kinbuck Bridge as well as the A listed Cromlix House, former seat of Viscount Strathallan and the Clan Drummond family. Cromlix house is now a hotel.

== Electricity/Gas ==
Due to its rural location the hamlet is often subject to power and gas outages.

Kinbuck is situated at the start of the controversial Beauly-Denny power line.

== Flooding ==
The area around Kinbuck floods easily due to the proximity of the River Allan.
