= St Clement's Cottage =

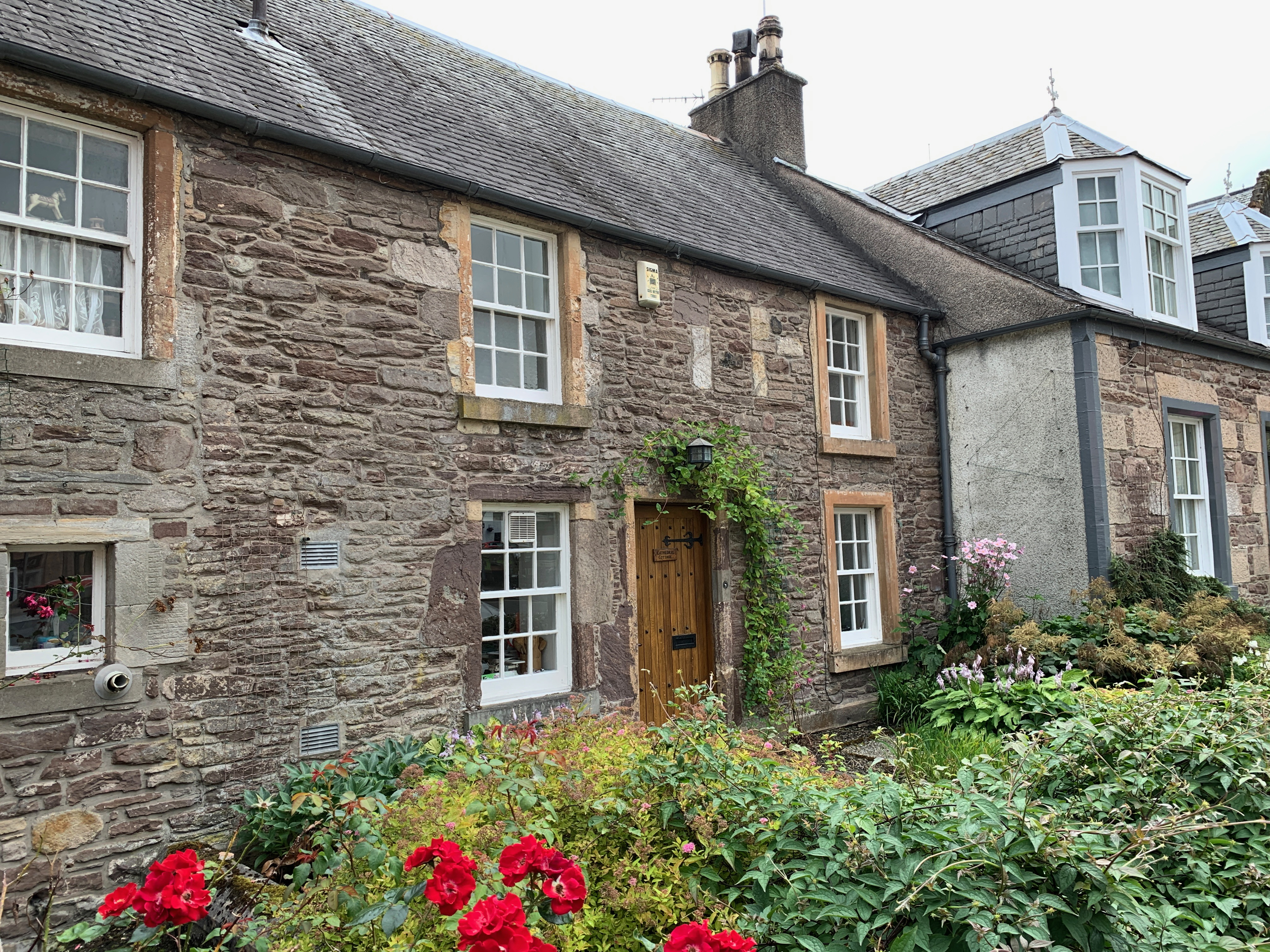
- The cottage in 2019, with Cathedral Cottage on the right

- Shown in Stirling
- 56.18884°N 3.964612°W
- Location: The Cross, Dunblane, Stirling, Scotland

History
- Built: c. 1850; 176 years ago

Listed Building – Category B
- Designated: 5 October 1971
- Reference no.: LB26369

St Clement's Cottage is a building in the Scottish town of Dunblane, Stirling. Located in The Cross, immediately to the south of Dunblane Cathedral, it is a Category B listed structure dating to the mid-19th century. It adjoins Cathedral Cottage, on its northern side, also of Category B listed status.

== Gallery ==
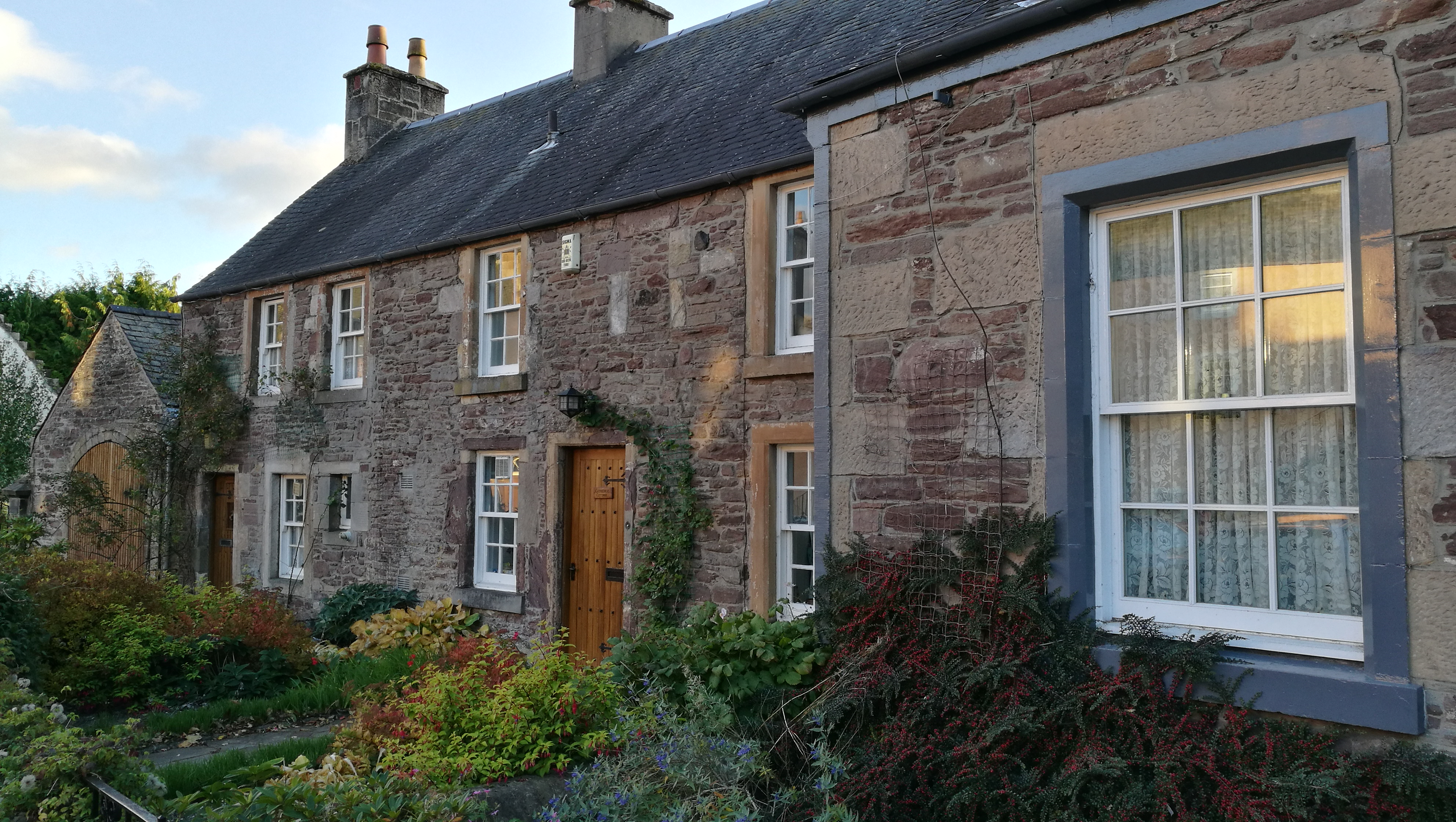
From in front of Cathedral Cottage

== See also ==
- List of listed buildings in Dunblane
