= Strathallan =

Strath of the Allan Water in Scotland

Coordinates: 56°15′02″N 3°51′07″W

Strathallan (Scottish Gaelic: Srath Ailein) is the strath of the Allan Water (Uisge Ailein) in Scotland. The strath stretches south west and south from Auchterarder in Perth & Kinross through Blackford, Dunblane, Bridge of Allan and on to Stirling.

Strathallan is also the name for one of the wards in the Perth and Kinross Council area.

In the 1230s, an attempt by Fergus, a son of Gille Brigte, Earl of Streathearn, to take land at Cotken on the Muir of Orchill under cultivation was frustrated when the monks of Lindores Abbey took legal action to safeguard the rights of its dependents in the area. As a result, it remained an area of upland grazing and forage throughout the Middle Ages. In 1256/7, the monks of Lindores pursued a complaint against Robert, brother of the steward of Malise II, Earl of Strathearn and Joachim of Kinbuck, one of the earl's tenants, for denying their tenants at Feddal access to woods in Glen Lichorn and at Curelundyn to cut timber for their building and agricultural needs.

In 2015 and 2016 Strathallan Castle, traditional seat of the Viscount Strathallan, hosted the T in the Park music festival, which was forced to move from its previous site at Balado airfield due to safety concerns.

The main A9 road from central Scotland to the north of the country runs the length of Strathallan, as does the former Caledonian Railway line from Stirling to Perth and beyond.

Strathallan School, a private boarding and day school, was originally located in Bridge of Allan but relocated away from the area to Forgandenny, Perth, in 1920.
