= List of listed buildings in Dunblane =

This is a list of listed buildings in the parish of Dunblane in Stirling, Scotland.

== List ==
Name	Location	Date Listed	Grid Ref. (Note: Sometimes known as OSGB36, the grid reference (where provided) is based on the British national grid reference system used by the Ordnance Survey. • "Guide to National Grid". Ordnance Survey. • "Get-a-map". Ordnance Survey.)	Geo-coordinates	Notes	LB Number (Note: Historic Environment Scotland assign a unique alphanumeric identifier to each designated site in Scotland, for listed buildings this always begins with "LB", for example "LB12345".)	Image
1 Sinclair Street				56°11′21″N 3°57′49″W	Category B	26381	Upload Photo
3 Sinclair Street				56°11′21″N 3°57′48″W	Category C(S)	26383	Upload Photo
High Street, St Blane's Church (Church Of Scotland)				56°11′21″N 3°57′47″W	Category B	26386	Upload Photo
61 High Street Including Gatepiers				56°11′17″N 3°57′53″W	Category B	26395	Upload Photo
Perth Road, Ledcameroch Including Stables, Stable Yard Wall And Walled Garden				56°11′39″N 3°57′15″W	Category C(S)	26427	Upload Photo
Braeport, Gigha				56°11′26″N 3°57′52″W	Category C(S)	48942	Upload Photo
Perth Road, Kincairn, Cairndow And Rosebank Including Boundary Wall				56°11′21″N 3°57′27″W	Category C(S)	48961	Upload Photo
The Cross, The Manse Coach House, Gatepiers And Boundary Wall				56°11′20″N 3°57′52″W	Category C(S)	26370	Upload Photo
86-88 (Even Nos) High Street				56°11′18″N 3°57′50″W	Category C(S)	26389	Upload Photo
Allan Water, Dunblane Railway Viaduct				56°11′28″N 3°58′04″W	Category B	26425	Upload another image See more images
2-14 (Even Nos) High Street				56°11′12″N 3°57′49″W	Category C(S)	48956	Upload Photo
30-34 (Even Nos) High Street				56°11′15″N 3°57′50″W	Category C(S)	48957	Upload Photo
Perth Road, St Mary's Cottage Including Boundary Wall				56°11′17″N 3°57′30″W	Category C(S)	48962	Upload Photo
High Street, Old Sheriff Court House				56°11′20″N 3°57′50″W	Category C(S)	26390	Upload Photo
49 High Street Including Boundary Wall				56°11′16″N 3°57′51″W	Category C(S)	26396	Upload another image
22 And 24 High Street				56°11′14″N 3°57′50″W	Category C(S)	26398	Upload Photo
Braeport, Braeport Community Centre Including Boundary Wall				56°11′26″N 3°57′51″W	Category C(S)	26407	Upload Photo
Perth Road, Dunblane Hyrdo Hotel Including Hydro Lodge, Newton Cottage, Gatepiers And Boundary Wall				56°11′23″N 3°57′11″W	Category B	26409	Upload Photo
Stirling Road, Stirling Arms Including Boundary Wall				56°11′11″N 3°57′50″W	Category B	26414	Upload Photo
Mill Row, Allan Cottage				56°11′13″N 3°57′51″W	Category C(S)	26415	Upload Photo
Mill Row, Allanside Including Boundary Wall				56°11′13″N 3°57′52″W	Category C(S)	26416	Upload Photo
Claredon Place, Church Of The Holy Family, Roman Catholic Church Including, Presbytery, Church Hall And Boundary Wall				56°10′59″N 3°57′59″W	Category B	26422	Upload another image
Springbank Gardens, 1-12 (Inclusive), 14-30 (Inclusive) Springbank Mill Including Former School House				56°11′30″N 3°58′14″W	Category B	26426	Upload another image
Kirk Street, Cockburn House				56°11′21″N 3°57′50″W	Category B	26374	Upload Photo
16-18 (Even Nos) High Street				56°11′13″N 3°57′50″W	Category C(S)	26400	Upload Photo
The Crescent, Glenluss Including Boundary Wall And Gatepiers				56°11′14″N 3°57′14″W	Category B	26412	Upload Photo
7 Stirling Road				56°11′10″N 3°57′54″W	Category B	26419	Upload Photo
Claredon Place, Fernbank Including Gatepiers And Boundary Wall				56°11′02″N 3°58′01″W	Category B	26421	Upload Photo
124 And 126 High Street, Former Dunblane Free Church				56°11′19″N 3°57′46″W	Category C(S)	26428	Upload Photo
The Cross, Municipal Buildings				56°11′20″N 3°57′51″W	Category C(S)	48945	Upload Photo
27 And 29 High Street Including Vaulted Basement				56°11′15″N 3°57′52″W	Category C(S)	48952	Upload Photo
57 And 59 High Street				56°11′17″N 3°57′52″W	Category C(S)	48954	Upload Photo
Ramoyle, Ramoyle House				56°11′34″N 3°57′37″W	Category C(S)	48963	Upload Photo
Station Road, Dunblane Railway Station Including Original Footbridge				56°11′09″N 3°57′56″W	Category C(S)	48964	Upload Photo
The Cross, Cross Cottage Including Boundary Wall				56°11′20″N 3°57′53″W	Category C(S)	26368	Upload Photo
The Cross, Cathedral Cottage And St Clement's				56°11′20″N 3°57′53″W	Category B	26369	Upload another image
The Cross, Cathedral Museum, Including Residential Properties To South Adjoining Burgh Chambers And Well To Rear				56°11′21″N 3°57′51″W	Category A	26372	Upload another image See more images
58-62 (Even Nos)				56°11′16″N 3°57′50″W	Category C(S)	26397	Upload Photo
High Street, St Blane's House, Including Gatepiers And Boundary Wall				56°11′18″N 3°57′46″W	Category B	26402	Upload Photo
Perth Road, Anchorfield Including Boundary Wall				56°11′37″N 3°57′26″W	Category B	26408	Upload Photo
Doune Road, Albert Cottage				56°11′18″N 3°58′06″W	Category C(S)	26423	Upload Photo
Doune Road, 1 And 2 Calderwood Place				56°11′18″N 3°58′06″W	Category C(S)	26424	Upload Photo
The Crescent, Elmswood Including Stables And Boundary Wall				56°11′22″N 3°57′16″W	Category C(S)	48944	Upload Photo
Haining, Leighton House, (Front Elevation Only)				56°11′24″N 3°57′53″W	Category C(S)	48949	Upload Photo
High Street, Dunblane Public Library				56°11′20″N 3°57′44″W	Category C(S)	48951	Upload Photo
50-56 (Even Nos) High Street				56°11′16″N 3°57′50″W	Category C(S)	48958	Upload Photo
Perth Road, Crawford House Including Coach House				56°11′20″N 3°57′32″W	Category C(S)	48960	Upload Photo
91-95 (Odd Nos) High Street				56°11′20″N 3°57′47″W	Category B	26388	Upload Photo
114 High Street				56°11′20″N 3°57′47″W	Category C(S)	26392	Upload Photo
Smithy Loan, Holmehill Lodge Including Gatepiers				56°11′26″N 3°57′33″W	Category C(S)	26406	Upload Photo
Stirling Road, Bridge Of Dunblane				56°11′11″N 3°57′51″W	Category C(S)	26417	Upload another image
2 Bridgend And 9 Stirling Road				56°11′10″N 3°57′54″W	Category B	26418	Upload another image
Stirling Road, Formerly The Railway Hotel				56°11′10″N 3°57′53″W	Category C(S)	26420	Upload another image
The Cross, Dunblane Cathedral Halls				56°11′21″N 3°57′54″W	Category B	26364	Upload another image
Leewood Road, Ault Wharrie Including Summer House, Walled Garden, Terraced Garden Wall, Gate Lodge, Boundary Wall And Gatepiers				56°11′08″N 3°56′52″W	Category A	26365	Upload Photo
Old Bleaching Green, Monument				56°11′19″N 3°57′55″W	Category C(S)	26367	Upload another image
Kirk Street And Sinclair Street, Scottish Churches House, South Terrace				56°11′22″N 3°57′49″W	Category C(S)	26375	Upload Photo
Kirk Street, Scottish Churches House, Entrance House				56°11′22″N 3°57′49″W	Category B	26376	Upload another image
4 Sinclair Street				56°11′21″N 3°57′48″W	Category C(S)	26384	Upload Photo
108 And 112 High Street				56°11′19″N 3°57′48″W	Category C(S)	26391	Upload Photo
63 High Street, Bank House And Bank, Including Boundary Wall				56°11′18″N 3°57′52″W	Category B	26393	Upload Photo
Smithy Loan, Woodend Including Boundary Wall				56°11′19″N 3°57′39″W	Category C(S)	26403	Upload Photo
Perth Road, Burlington House Including Gatepiers And Boundary Wall				56°11′19″N 3°57′33″W	Category C(S)	26405	Upload Photo
Glen Road, Tomdoran				56°11′16″N 3°57′25″W	Category C(S)	26410	Upload Photo
Cathedral Square, Dunblane Cathedral (Cathedral Church Of St Blaan And St Laurence Including Churchyard, Boundary Wall And Riccarton's Stile)				56°11′22″N 3°57′54″W	Category A	26361	Upload another image
Braeport, Aurora				56°11′27″N 3°57′52″W	Category C(S)	48941	Upload Photo
The Haugh, War Memorial				56°11′22″N 3°58′01″W	Category C(S)	48950	Upload Photo
53 High Street				56°11′17″N 3°57′52″W	Category C(S)	48953	Upload Photo
Newton Crescent, Provan Including Boundary Wall				56°11′15″N 3°57′02″W	Category B	49658	Upload Photo
The Cross, Leighton Library				56°11′19″N 3°57′52″W	Category A	26371	Upload another image
Kirk Street, Scottish Churches House, North Terrace				56°11′22″N 3°57′50″W	Category B	26377	Upload Photo
Kirk Street, Vaulted Chamber				56°11′22″N 3°57′48″W	Category B	26380	Upload another image
2 Sinclair Street				56°11′21″N 3°57′48″W	Category C(S)	26382	Upload Photo
5 Sinclair Street				56°11′21″N 3°57′47″W	Category C(S)	26385	Upload Photo
High Street, Balhaldie House Including Gatepiers And Boundary Wall				56°11′19″N 3°57′43″W	Category B	26387	Upload Photo
Perth Road, St Mary's Episcopal Church Including Gatepiers And Boundary Wall				56°11′18″N 3°57′35″W	Category B	26404	Upload Photo
The Crescent, Glenacres Including Summer House				56°11′13″N 3°57′19″W	Category B	26411	Upload Photo
Glen Road, Doocot Cottage, Dovecot				56°11′06″N 3°57′18″W	Category B	26413	Upload another image

== Key ==
The scheme for classifying buildings in Scotland is:

- Category A: "buildings of national or international importance, either architectural or historic; or fine, little-altered examples of some particular period, style or building type."
- Category B: "buildings of regional or more than local importance; or major examples of some particular period, style or building type, which may have been altered."
- Category C: "buildings of local importance; lesser examples of any period, style, or building type, as originally constructed or moderately altered; and simple traditional buildings which group well with other listed buildings."

In March 2016 there were 47,288 listed buildings in Scotland. Of these, 8% were Category A, and 50% were Category B, with the remaining 42% being Category C.
