= Dunblane Hotel =

Railway hotel in Scotland

- The Dunblane
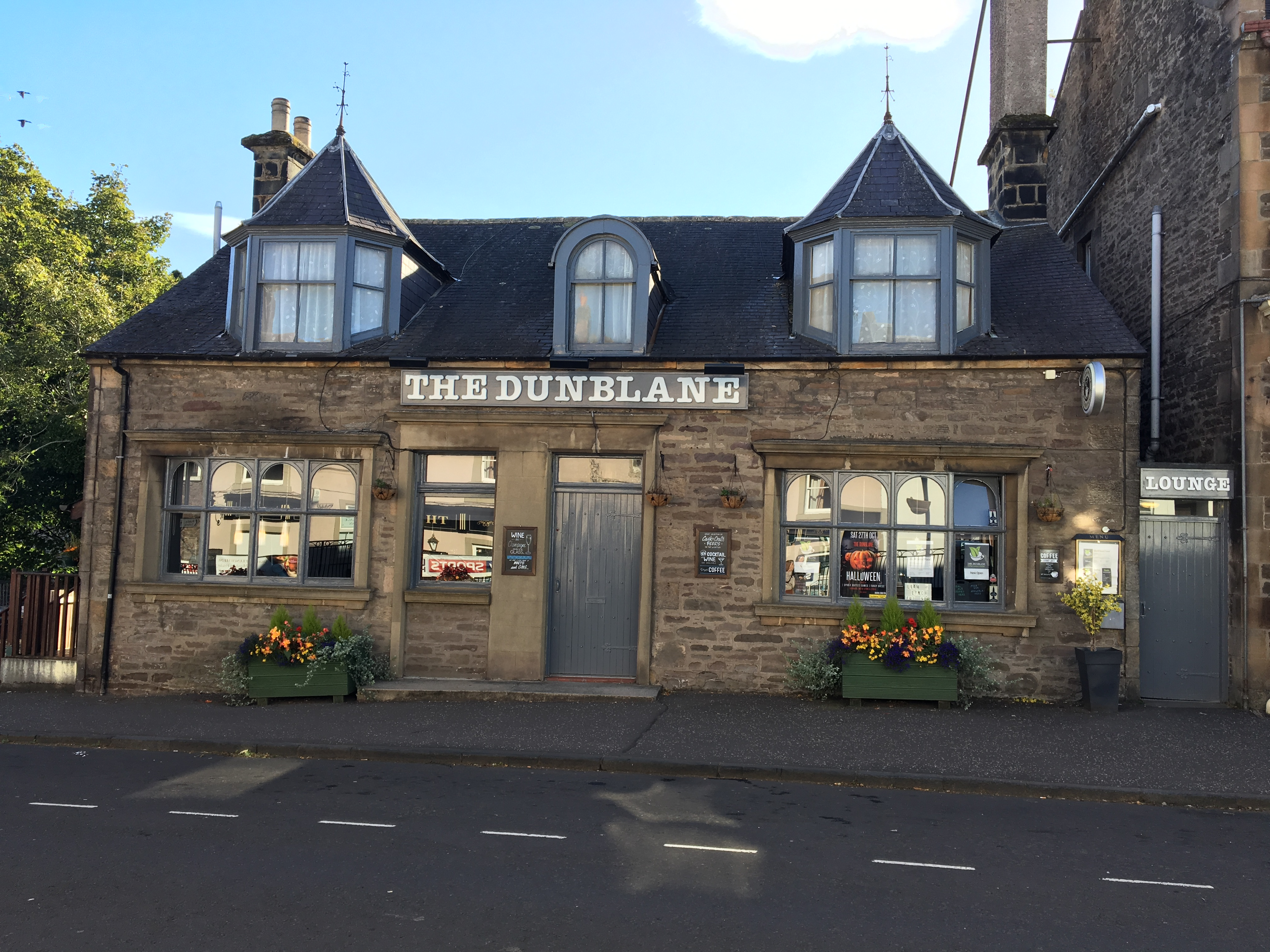
- The hotel in 2018
- Former names: Star Inn; Railway Hotel

General information
- Location: Stirling Road; Dunblane; Scotland
- Coordinates: 56.186017°N 3.964719°W
- Completed: Late 18th century
- Governing body: Historic Environment Scotland

Website
- https://www.dunblane.info/dcc/185-thedunblane

Dunblane Hotel (also known as The Dunblane) is an historic building in Dunblane, Scotland. Located on Stirling Street, it is a Category C listed building built in the late 18th century.

Originally a barn, the structure was, according to Historic Environment Scotland, "rebuilt as an inn from 1820, when it was known as the Star Inn. The inn was renamed as the Railway Hotel when Dunblane railway station was opened in 1846."

== See also ==
- List of listed buildings in Dunblane
