= William Drummond, 7th Viscount Strathallan =

Scottish Conservative politician

William Henry Drummond, 7th Viscount Strathallan (5 March 1810 – 23 January 1886), styled the Master of Strathallan from 1826 to 1851, was a Scottish Conservative politician. Because of the history of the viscountcy of Strathallan (attainder 1746, reversed 1824) he is also considered the de jure 9th Viscount Strathallan.

Strathallan was the son of James Drummond, 6th Viscount Strathallan, and his wife Lady Amelia Sophia, daughter of John Murray, 4th Duke of Atholl. He gained the courtesy title of Master of Strathallan when his father had the attainder of the viscountcy of Strathallan reversed in 1826 and succeeded in the viscountcy on his father's death in 1851. In 1853 he was elected a Scottish representative peer, and took his seat on the Conservative benches in the House of Lords. He served as a Lord-in-waiting (government whip in the House of Lords) under the Earl of Derby from 1858 to 1859 and under Derby and later Benjamin Disraeli from 1866 to 1868.

Lord Strathallan married Christina Maria, daughter of Robert Baird, in 1833. She died in 1867. Strathallan survived her by almost twenty years and died in January 1886, aged 75. He was succeeded in the viscountcy by his son James.

== Publications ==
- The Large Game and Natural History of South and South-East Africa (1875)

== Notes ==
Peerage of Scotland
Preceded by James Drummond	Viscount Strathallan; 1851–1886	Succeeded by James David Drummond
