= Kilbryde Castle =

Castle in Stirling, Scotland

Coordinates: 56.2093°N 4.0073°W

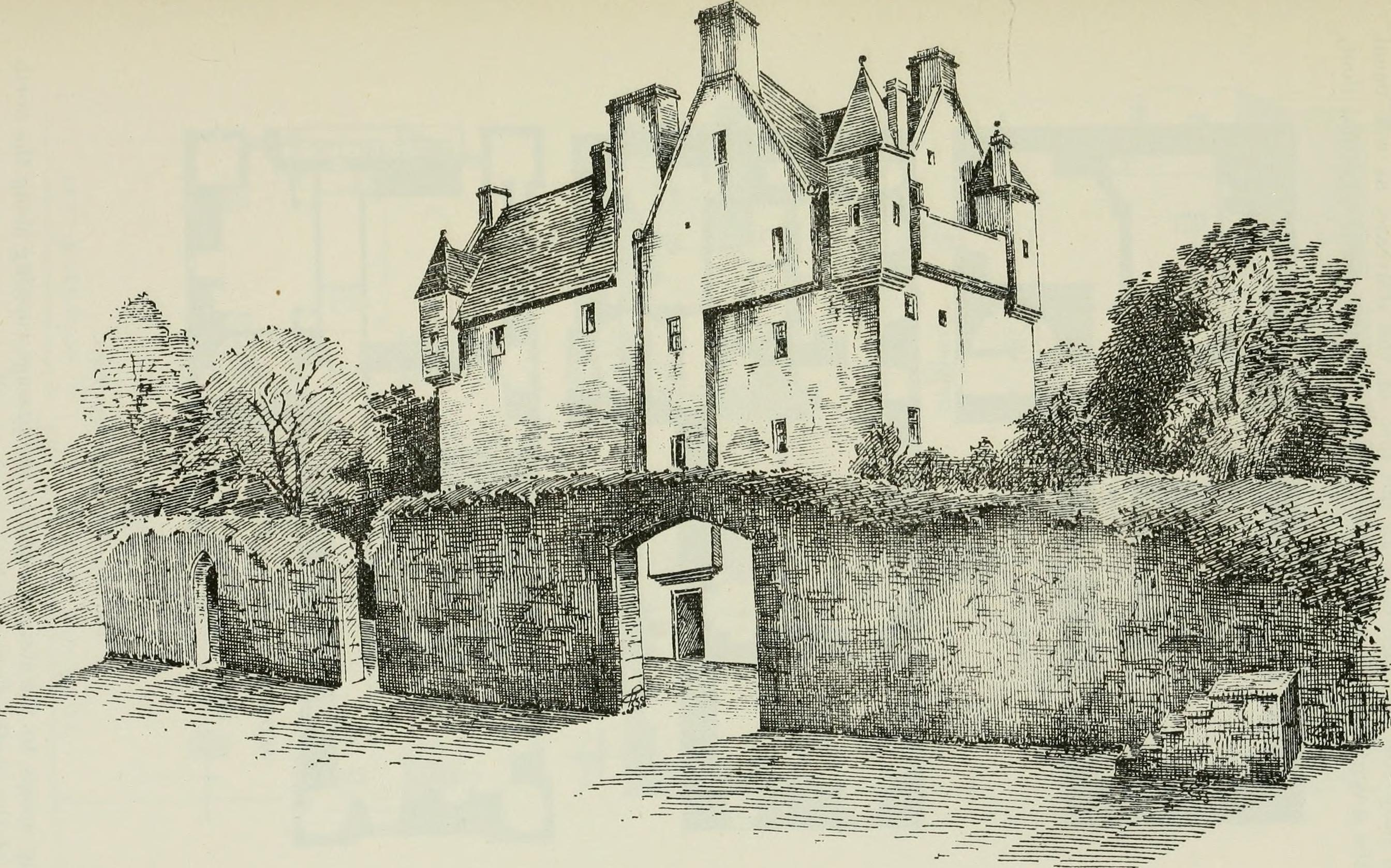
Kilbryde Castle

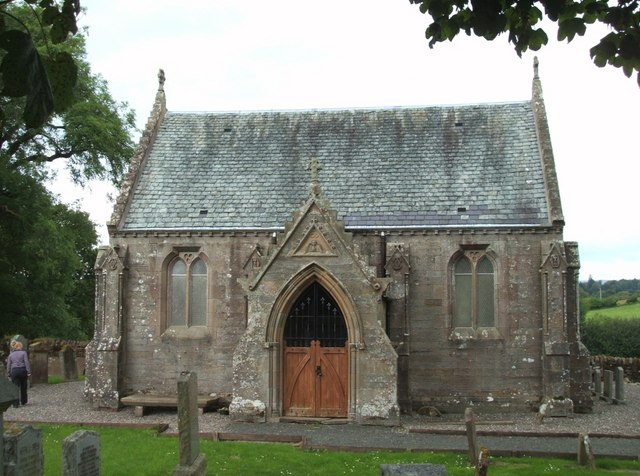
Kilbryde Chapel

Kilbryde Castle is a castellated Scottish castle in the Scots baronial style.

The castle lies on the A820 between Doune and Dunblane in southern Perthshire.

Its extensive gardens are open to the public on selected days or by appointment.

The property was originally built by the Earl of Menteith in 1460. It is currently owned by Sir James and Lady Carola Campbell. The family has owned the castle since 1659.

The castle was the home of Sir J. Campbell baronet in the mid 19th century.

The castle was remodelled by the Scottish architect Thomas Heiton to its current appearance in the late 1870s following the collapse of the roof in 1877. The building was refurbished again in the 1950s.
