= Scheduled monuments in Stirling =

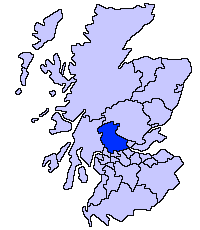
Stirling shown within Scotland

A scheduled monument in Scotland is a nationally important archaeological site or monument which is given legal protection by being placed on a list (or "schedule") maintained by Historic Environment Scotland. The aim of scheduling is to preserve the country's most significant sites and monuments as far as possible in the form in which they have been inherited.

The process of scheduling is governed by the Ancient Monuments and Archaeological Areas Act 1979, which aims "to make provision for the investigation, preservation and recording of matters of archaeological or historical interest". The term "scheduled monument" can apply to the whole range of archaeological sites which have been deliberately constructed by human activity but are not always visible above ground. They range from prehistoric standing stones and burial sites, through Roman remains and medieval structures such as castles and monasteries, to later structures such as industrial sites and buildings constructed for the World Wars. Some buildings or structures which were both scheduled and listed have had their listing designations removed to reduce the duplication.

In 2017 there were 8238 scheduled monuments in Scotland.

== Notable Scheduled Monuments in Stirling ==
Name	Location	Description	Ref No	Image
Killin Stone Circle	Kinnell Park, Killin	Later Neolithic or Bronze Age stone circle	SM1557	
Castle Law (Dumyat)	Logie	Prehistoric Fort on summit	SM2182	
Mugdock Castle, Milgavie	Strathblane	Roofless tower	SM2805	
Sir John de Graham's Castle	St Ninians	Remains of small castle	SM4278	
Doune Castle	Kilmadock	14th-century castle	SM12765	
Cambuskenneth Abbey	Stirling	Remains of 12th-century Arrouaisian monastery	SM90055	
Inchmahome Priory	Port of Menteith	Remains of 13th-century Augustinian priory	SM90169	
Stirling Castle	Stirling	Royal castle complex	SM90291	

== See also ==
- List of Category A listed buildings in Stirling
