= St Mary's Episcopal Church, Dunblane =

Church in Dunblane, Scotland

Coordinates: 56.1882°N 3.9596°W

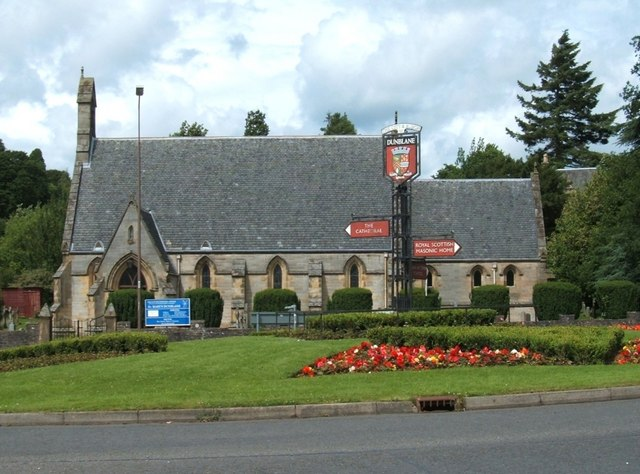
St Mary's Church

St Mary's Episcopal Church is a medium-sized church of the Scottish Episcopal Church in Dunblane, Scotland. It is situated by the Fourways roundabout.

St Mary's church was consecrated by Patrick Torry, the Bishop of St Andrews, Dunkeld and Dunblane in 1845. It was listed as Category B in 1971.

Rev Nerys Brown has succeeded the Rev Nick Green, who succeeded Rev Kimberly Bohan, Canon Janice Cameron, Canon Gianfranco Tellini, Canon John Symon, and many others back to Canon Henry Malcolm, the first Rector of 50 years from 1845.

The church grounds consists of a graveyard, the manse, a medium-sized church hall with kitchen and committee room. A quiet garden was opened to members of the public in early 2014.
