= Leighton Library =

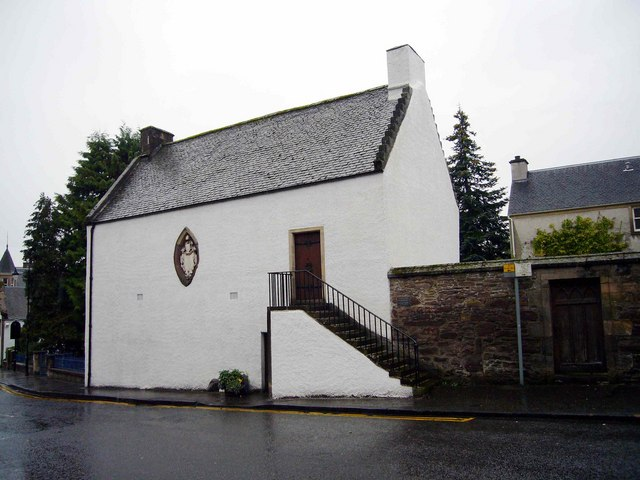
- Interactive map of the Leighton Library area
- Alternative names: Bibliotheca Leightoniana

General information
- Location: Dunblane, Scotland
- Coordinates: 56.189°N 3.965°W
- Completed: 1687

Website
- http://www.leightonlibrary.org.uk/

Listed Building – Category A
- Designated: 5 October 1971
- Reference no.: LB26371

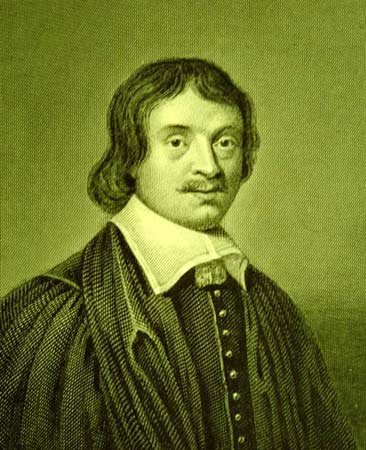
Archbishop Robert Leighton, 1611-84

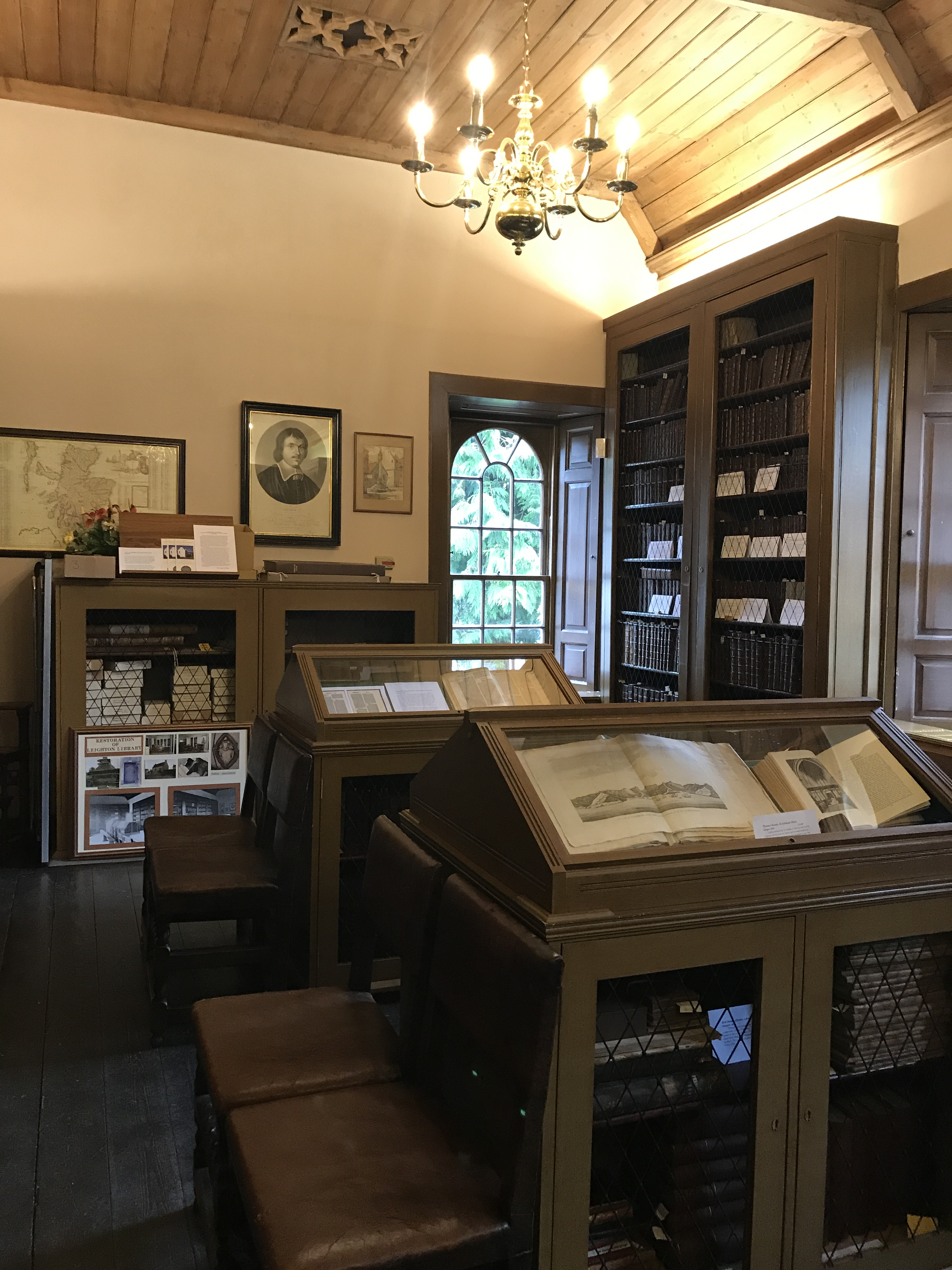
Leighton Library, Dunblane. Internal shot of the bookcases and display units.

The Leighton Library, or Bibliotheca Leightoniana, in The Cross, Dunblane, is the oldest purpose-built library in Scotland and also has a well-documented history as one of the earliest public-subscription libraries in Scotland. Its collection of around 4,000 volumes and 78 manuscripts from the 16th to 19th century is founded on the personal collection of Robert Leighton (1611–1684), Minister at Newbattle, Principal of Edinburgh University, Bishop of Dunblane and Archbishop of Glasgow. Robert Leighton's personal collection consisted of 1,400 books and the Leighton Library was built to host the books which had been left to Dunblane Cathedral.

== History ==
Archbishop Robert Leighton died in London on 25 June 1684. His will, written on 17 February 1683, left a small token to his sister and her son, Saphira and Edward Lightmaker of Broadhurst. They jointly became executors to Leighton's will and carried out his wishes to have his books bequeathed to Dunblane Cathedral. Edward wrote to the Bishop of Dunblane on 8 July to inform him that the books were ready to be transported by sea and that a sum of £100 had been put aside for the building of a chamber to house the books.

The library was completed in 1687, with Dr James Fall, the Principal of the University of Glasgow, coming to inspect the building erected in his friend's memory. The total cost of the works was £162 2s. 6d. sterling, which included the payment for more land for the foundations of the building and was paid for by the Lightmakers.

The Lightmakers also donated a sum of £200 to provide a salary for the librarian and also to go towards the upkeep of the library. The oldest book in Leighton's collection was a copy of Herbert's Exquisitio, which is dated 1504. Other books of interest include the works Justin Martyr, Walton's Biblia Polyglotta in six volumes and the works of St Augustine.

There have been donations of books to the library over the years. Shortly after it opened, it received a large donation from James Turner of Dunblane. In the early 18th century, another large donation came from Thomas Hislop; these included several 17th-century books. Other donors include Dr David Laing and George Paton.

== Public subscription ==
The trustees of the Leighton Library voted to offer the service of a public subscription to the library on 31 October 1734. The first to pay for the service were two of the trustees, Sir James Campbell and Sir Hugh Paterson, with each of them giving £3. Although the readership contained small numbers, the high quality of the collection meant that there was constant support from the gentry, professionals and the clergy.

It was in the 19th century that the library had a rise in numbers; this was due to the mineral wells that had been discovered on the Cromlix Estate in 1813. During the period where the wells had many visitors, the trustees offered a temporary membership to the library for 2s. 6d. a fortnight. By 1831, the subscription to the library had risen to 10s. 6d. for full members. Dunblane was over-shadowed by Bridge of Allan for its water, and the library struggled to keep its readers: by 1843, the subscription to the library had fallen to 5s.

== Bibliotheca Leightoniana ==
The two-storey building consists of one apartment which is entered from a stone staircase, beneath the apartment are two vaults which have previously been used as a plasterer's store and at a later point as a painter's store. The library is lit by three windows, two to the west of the building and one to the south, it is a wood lined library with sixteen bookcases lining the walls and low presses for books stand in the centre of the room. The fore-stair into the building had originally run from east to west but at the start of the 19th century it was changed to run north to south.

During the period of 1842-1870, the library was briefly opened for general reading, and was then closed from the mid 1850s. At the beginning of the 20th century the building had fallen into neglect and was affected by damp and, during World War II, an air-raid shelter was constructed within its vaults. During the 1950s and 1980s renovation, repair, and cataloguing was carried out, and the library was officially re-opened in May 1990. The library's collection has grown from 1,400 books to 4,500 books. The library was given listed status as of 5 October 1971, and is a category A listed building.

== See also ==
- List of Category A listed buildings in Stirling
- List of listed buildings in Dunblane
