= Viscount Strathallan =

The title of Lord Maderty was created in 1609 for James Drummond, a younger son of the 2nd Lord Drummond of Cargill. The titles of Viscount Strathallan and Lord Drummond of Cromlix were created in 1686 for William Drummond, a younger son of the 2nd Lord Madderty. Both creations were in the Peerage of Scotland, and are now held by the Earl of Perth.

== Estates and residences ==
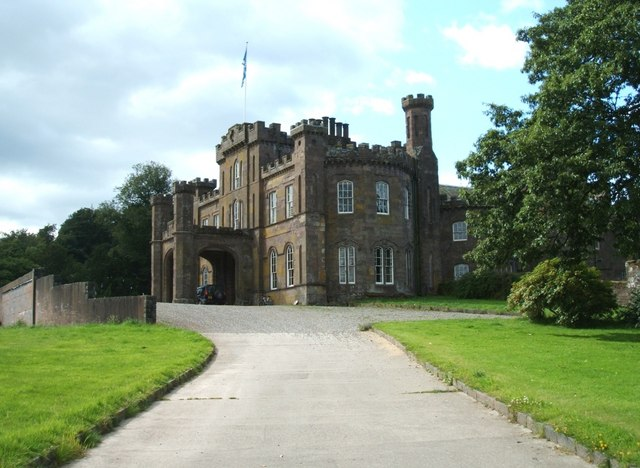
Strathallan Castle, ancestral seat of the Viscounts Strathallan (sold in 1910).

The ancestral seat of the Viscounts Strathallan was Strathallan Castle in Perthshire. In the 1883 Edition of John Bateman's The Great Landowners of Great Britain and Ireland Lord Strathallan's estates were listed as 7,208 acres in Perthshire which generated an income of £7,611.

The 10th Viscount Strathallan had made the estate's Dower house Machany House his primary residence by the time he died in 1893. During the early 1900s Strathallan Castle had been leased to Graeme Whitelaw M.P.

Following Whitelaw's departure from the district, in 1910 William Drummond, 11th Viscount Strathallan (who had also succeeded a distant cousin as Earl of Perth in 1902) sold the ancestral Strathmore Estates at Strathallan, Tullibardine, and Machany (then comprising 7,322 acres) to industrialist Sir James Roberts, 1st Baronet.

== Lords Maderty (1609) ==
- James Drummond, 1st Lord Maderty (d. July 1623)
- John Drummond, 2nd Lord Maderty (d. 1647)
- David Drummond, 3rd Lord Maderty (d. 20 January 1692)

title passes to a descendant of the 1st Viscount Strathallan, who becomes 4th Lord Maderty (below)

== Viscounts Strathallan (1686) ==
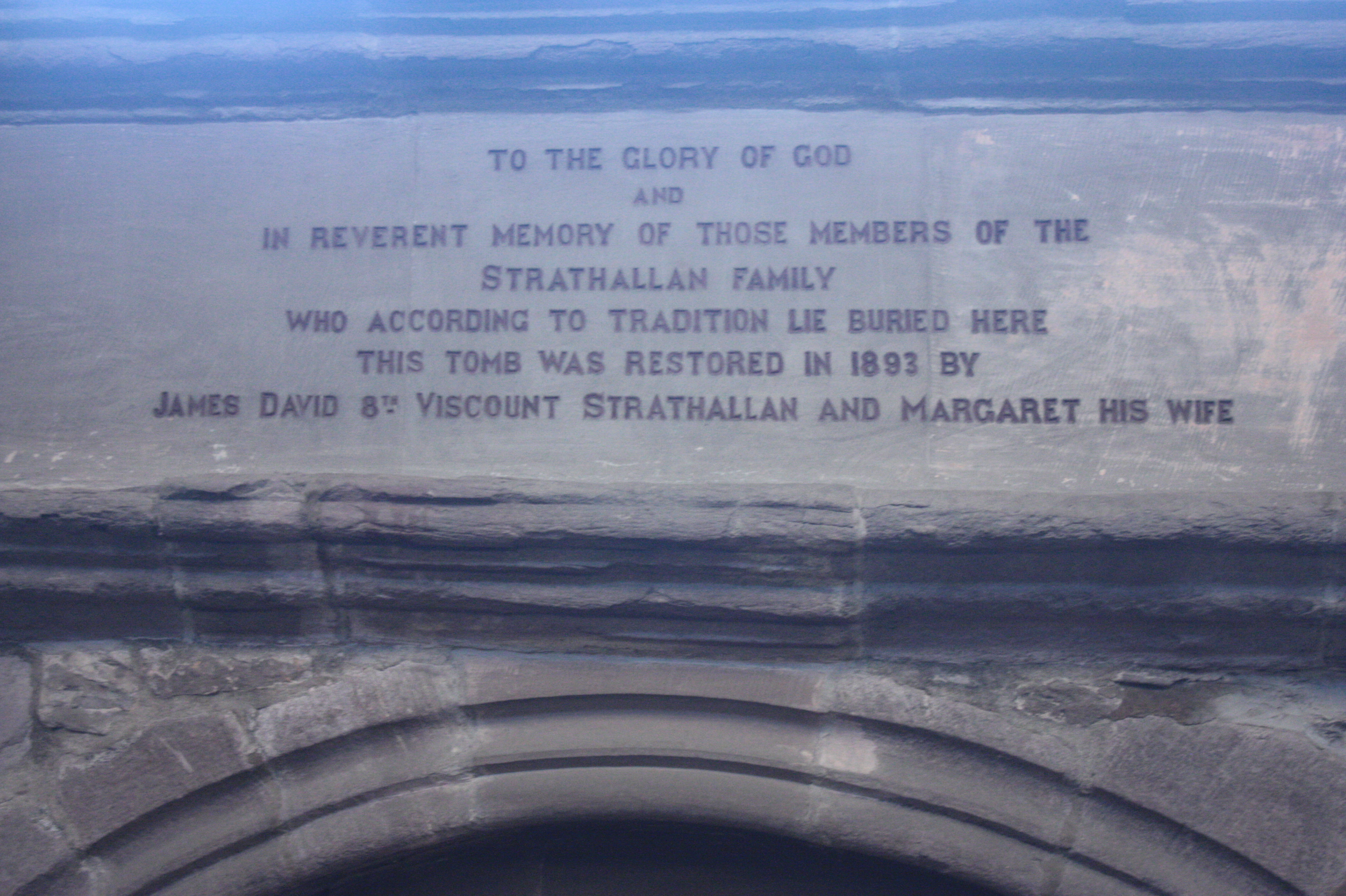
Marker for the Strathallan graves, Dunblane Cathedral

- William Drummond, 1st Viscount Strathallan (1617 – 23 March 1688)
- William Drummond, 2nd Viscount Strathallan (8 August 1670 – 7 July 1702)
- William Drummond, 3rd Viscount Strathallan (1694 – 26 May 1711)
- William Drummond, 4th Viscount Strathallan (d. Culloden 16 April 1746)
- James Drummond, de jure 5th Viscount Strathallan (1722 – 22 June 1765), attainted 1746 for his father's support of the Jacobite rebellion
- James Drummond, de jure 6th Viscount Strathallan (c. 1752 – 10 December 1775)
- General Andrew John Drummond, de jure 7th Viscount Strathallan (1758 – 20 January 1814)
- James Andrew John Laurence Charles Drummond, 8th Viscount Strathallan (24 March 1767 – 14 May 1851). By Act of Parliament in 1824, the attainder of 1746 was reversed and James became Viscount.
- William Henry Drummond, 9th Viscount Strathallan (5 March 1810 – 23 January 1886)
- James Drummond, 10th Viscount Strathallan (1839–1893)
- William Huntley Drummond, 11th Viscount Strathallan (1871–1937), succeeded as 15th Earl of Perth in 1902
- James Eric Drummond, 12th Viscount Strathallan, 16th Earl of Perth (1876–1951)
- John David Drummond, 13th Viscount Strathallan, 17th Earl of Perth (1907–2002)
- John Drummond, 14th Viscount Strathallan, 18th Earl of Perth (1935–2023)
- (See Earl of Perth for further succession)
