= Church of the Holy Family, Dunblane =

Church in Stirling, Scotland

Church of the Holy Family
- Church of the Holy Family, Dunblane
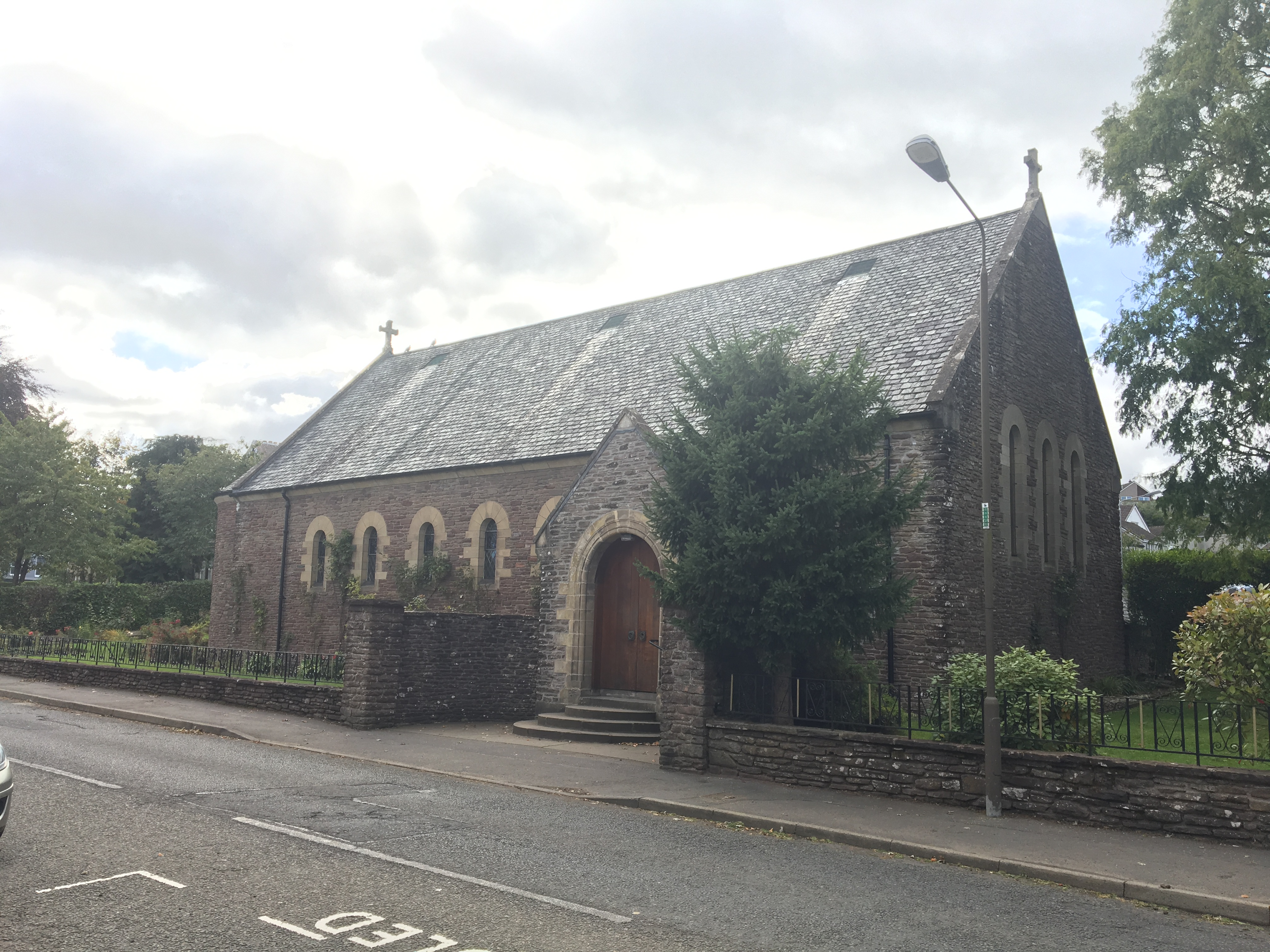
- Church of the Holy Family
- 56°11′00″N 3°57′59″W
- Denomination: Roman Catholic
- Website: holyfamilydunblane.org

History
- Founded: 1934

Administration
- Province: St Andrews and Edinburgh
- Diocese: Dunkeld

Clergy
- Bishop: Stephen Robson
- Priest: William Brandon

The Church of the Holy Family is a Catholic church located in Dunblane, Scotland.

== History ==
From 1883 the local Catholic community met in a coach house in the grounds. The priest would travel from the Catholic church at Doune for mass each Sunday. The church was planned in the early 1930s and the building completed and officially opened on 27 December 1934. It was designed by the Scottish architect Reginald Fairlie. It is Romanesque in style with an Arts and Craft style roof.

== Memorial Window ==
The Dunblane Memorial Window is a set of three stained glass windows that were erected in memory of those who were killed or injured in the Dunblane massacre at Dunblane Primary School on 13 March 1996.
