= Dunblane Museum =

Scottish historic building

Cathedral Museum
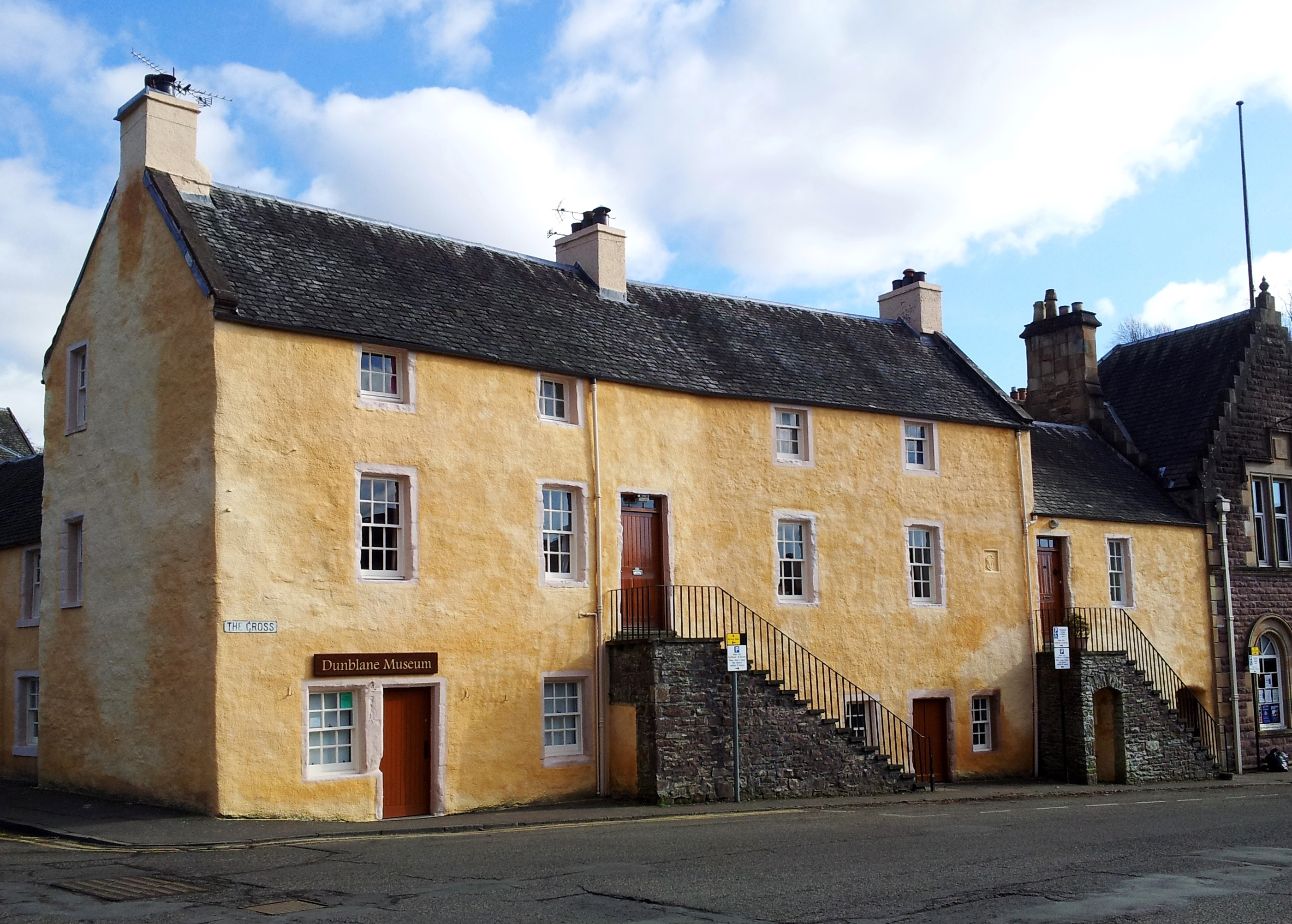
- The building in 2013

- Shown in Stirling
- 56.189065°N 3.964053°W
- Location: The Cross, Dunblane, Stirling, Scotland

History
- Built: Early 17th century

Listed Building – Category A
- Designated: 5 October 1971
- Reference no.: LB26372

Dunblane Museum is a historic building in the Scottish town of Dunblane, Stirling. Located in The Cross, immediately to the south of Dunblane Cathedral, it is a Category A listed building dating to the early 17th century. It is home to the Dunblane Museum, which opened in 1943.

== History ==
A former townhouse thought to date back to 1624, the building was enlarged in 1765. In 1943, the museum was established to exhibit items from the Dunblane Cathedral, which dates back to the 11th century. It has one of the largest collections of communion tokens. The museum's collections have been expanded over the years to include items related to Dunblane's history, going back as far as 4000 years. Today, the museum also exhibits items relating to tennis players Andy Murray and Jamie Murray. The museum also holds genealogical records for the Dunblane area. The museum is run entirely by volunteers. It also hosts a gift shop.

The original sections fronting onto The Cross are thought to have been constructed by James Pearson, who was dean of the cathedral in 1624, for the initials and the coat-of-arms on the carved plaque are his. The first floor of the main block was likely his townhouse. The Kirk Street section is believed to have originally been constructed as separate cottages. It is not known when the two structures were combined. The building was added to the register of Category A listed buildings on 5 October 1971. A two-storey exhibition hall overlooking the courtyard was added during a 2009 redevelopment.

== See also ==
- List of listed buildings in Dunblane
