= Patrick James Stirling =

Scottish lawyer (1809–23 March 1891)

- Born: 1809; Dunblane, Scotland
- Education: University of St Andrews; University of Edinburgh
- Occupations: Lawyer and author on law and economics

Patrick James Stirling FRSE LLD (1809–23 March 1891) was a 19th-century Scottish lawyer and author on law and economics. He was the leading lawyer in western Perthshire.

== Life ==
He was born at Dunblane in 1809, the son of Mary Graham (d.1846) and her husband, Robert Stirling (1765–1817). He appears to be related to the Stirlings of Kippendavie.

He studied law at the University of St Andrews and the University of Edinburgh.

In 1848, he was elected a Fellow of the Royal Society of Edinburgh, his proposer being James Haldane. He was awarded an honorary doctorate (LLD) by the University of St Andrews for his literary works.

He died on 23 March 1891.

== Family ==
In 1836, he married Katherine Murray (b.1806).

== Publications ==
- The Law (translated the French text of Frederic Bastiat's book into English)
- Economic Sophisms (co-written with Frederic Bastiat)
- The Philosophy of Trade
- Fallacies of Protection (co-written with Frederic Bastiat)
- Harmonies of Political Economy 2 vols (co-written with Frederic Bastiat)
- The Australian and Californian Gold Discoveries
- Essays on Political Economy (co-written with Frederic Bastiat)
