= Cromlix House =

Country house hotel in Stirling, Scotland

Coordinates: 56°13′54″N 3°58′00″W

Cromlix is a hotel near Kinbuck, Stirlingshire, Scotland. It was originally constructed as a Victorian mansion, then first operated as a hotel from the early 1980s to 2012.

It was bought by tennis player Andy Murray and the hotel re-opened in April 2014, being managed by ICMI management group until December 2022. The hotel was brought into self-management from January 2023 by the Murrays and was refurbished.

== History ==
There are records of Cromlix from the 1500s, when the Bishop of Dunblane sold the lands of Cromlix to his brother, Robert Chisholm. A house was built on the site in 1874 as a family residence in the time of Captain Arthur Drummond Hay, but was destroyed by fire in 1878. It was replaced in 1880 by Cromlix House. Cromlix House was built for Arthur Hay-Drummond, son of the 11th Earl of Kinnoull. King Edward VII visited in September 1908. The house remained a family home for the Hay-Drummonds until the 1971 death of Evelyn Hay-Drummond, who had married Terence Eden (8th Lord Auckland).

Cromlix House was converted in May 1981 from the Eden family home, and retained much of the original furniture and family portraits. It also contains Cromlix Chapel, a consecrated Episcopalian Church in the diocese of Dunblane dating from 1874 which was opened by reverend Charles Wordsworth of Bishop of St Andrews, Dunkeld and Dunblane. The church's reredos were carved by Alexander MacDonald, a sculptor who lived in Rome.

The house sits on a 2,000-acre (810 ha) estate and occupies approximately 34 acres (14 ha) of parkland, forestry and four fishing lochs, as well as two mineral springs.

Between the 1980s and its closure on 16 February 2012, it was run as a four-star country house hotel, with 14 bedrooms including eight suites.

In 2006 Cromlix House – including the game larder, ancillary building, gatepiers and garden boundary walls – was designated as a Category C listed building. An obelisk sundial in the garden is Category A listed.

In October 2010, it served as the wedding venue for tennis player Jamie Murray and Alejandra Murray (née Gutierrez).

The hotel closed in 2011 and again in early 2013. In February 2013, it was confirmed that Andy Murray had bought the property for £1.8 million. It opened as a 15-room five-star hotel in April 2014. In April 2015, Cromlix was the venue for the wedding reception of tennis player Andy Murray and his wife Kim, and the following year Murray's father and partner Sam Watson were married at the hotel.

In January 2023, the Murrays moved to self-management of the hotel and closed the hotel for a total refurbishment. All of the hotel's bedrooms and bathrooms were renovated as well as the restaurant, the bar and all common areas of the hotel.

A further bedroom (Dahlia) was added in 2025.

In January 2026, the hotel closed again for further alterations. They include the construction of a new, glass fronted restaurant on the main lawn, a new, intimate, fine-dining restaurant inside the main building, three new bedrooms including an accessible, ground-floor suite, a one-person treatement space in the woodland and an extensive, state of the art kitchen serving all of the restaurants at the hotel. The Glasshouse will become a dedicated afternoon tea and events space, and a new private event room (The Library) will open on the first floor.

== Awards ==
Cromlix has won the following awards:

- AA Hotel of the Year, Scotland 2024–25
- AA Notable Wine List 2024
- MICHELIN key, MICHELIN Guide 2024
- Rural Hotel of the Year, Food & Travel Reader Awards 2024
- Scottish Excellence Awards – Chef of the Year and Independent Hotel of the Year 2024
- Best Hotel Experience, Scottish Thistle Awards 2023
- AA 5 Red Stars, AA Inspectors' Choice in Britain & Ireland 2023
- AA 3 Rosette Award for Culinary Excellence, AA Inspectors' Choice in Britain & Ireland 2023
- Winner of the "Best for Walkies", Pets Pyjamas Travel Awards 2023
- Conde Nast Traveller Readers' Choice – Top 30 Hotels in the United Kingdom 2021
