= Allan Water =

River in Scotland, United Kingdom

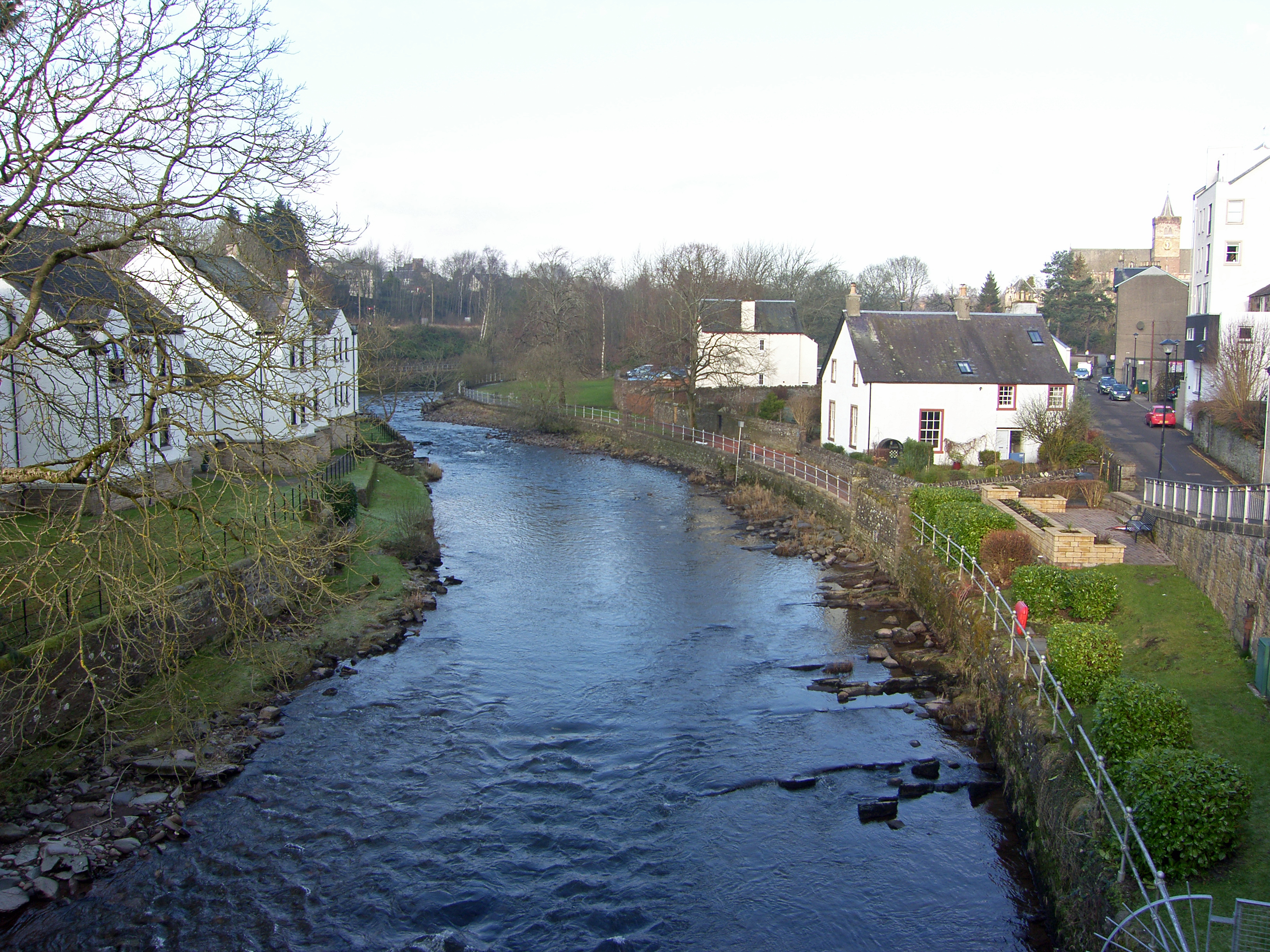
- The Allan Water at Dunblane
- Native name: Uisge Alain (Scottish Gaelic)

Location
- Country: United Kingdom
- Constituent country: Scotland

Physical characteristics
- Mouth: River Forth
  - coordinates: 56°08′30″N 3°57′16″W

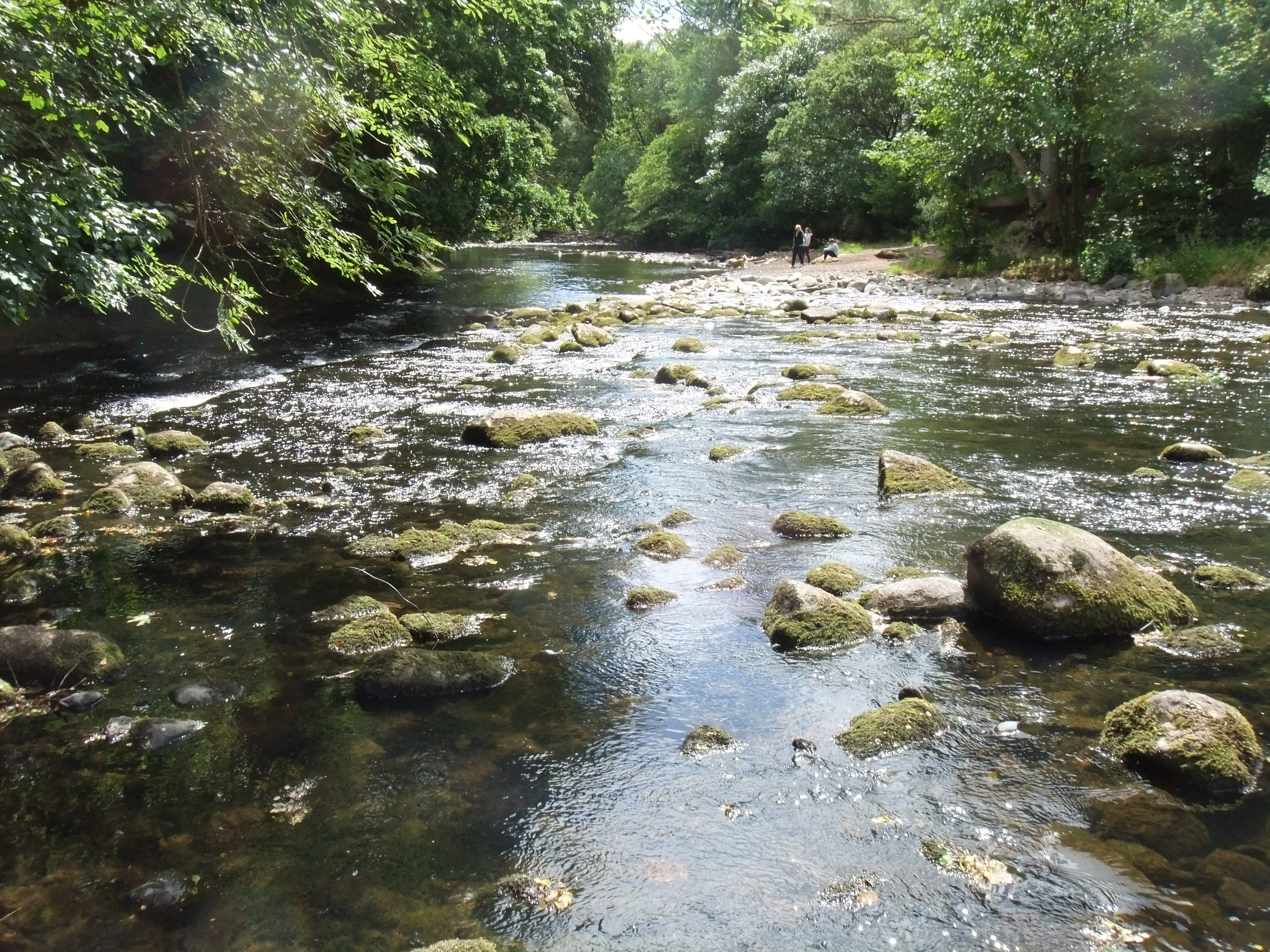
Allan Water above Bridge of Allan in dry summer

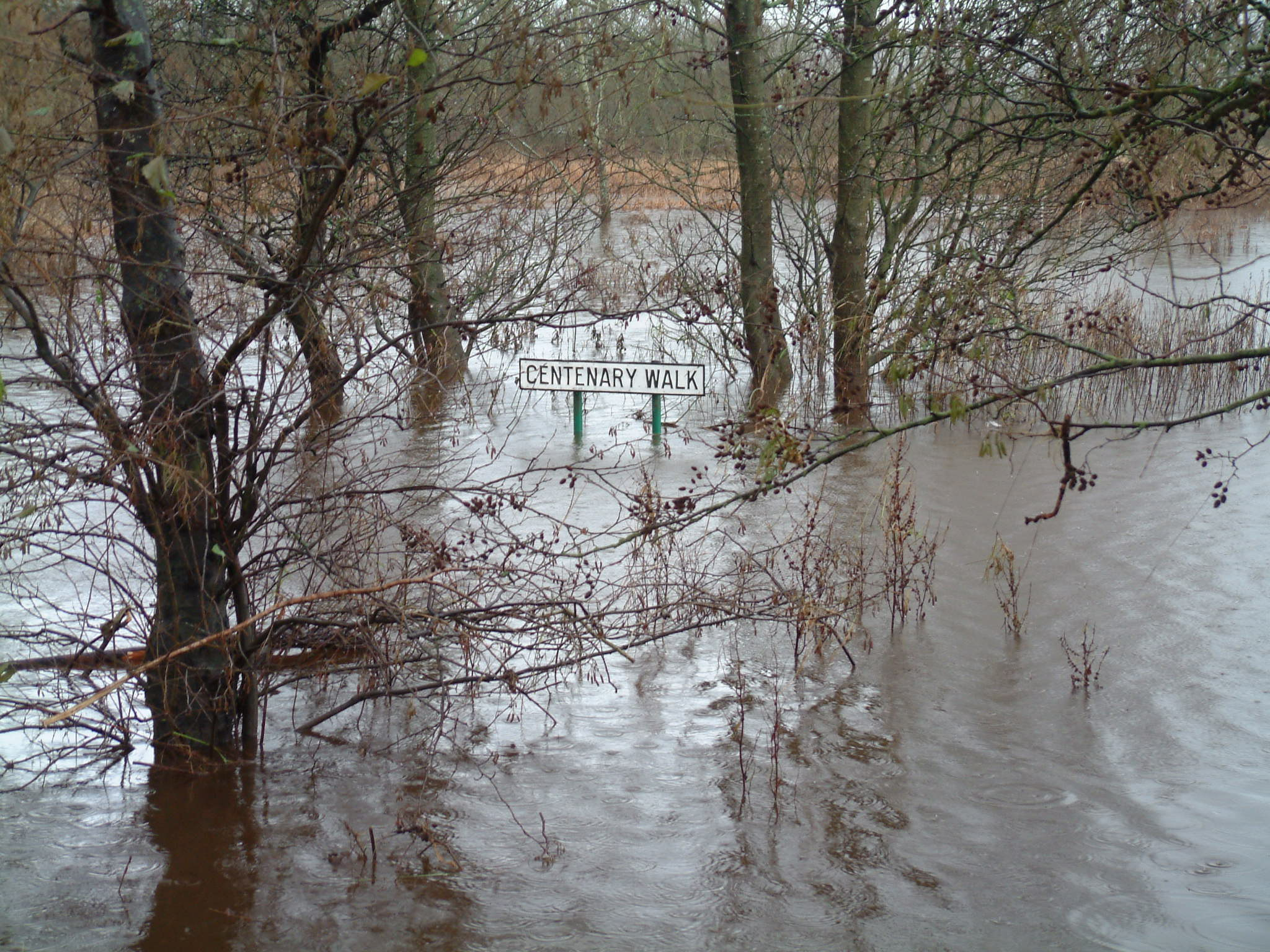
Floods at lower Bridge of Allan in winter

The Allan Water (Scottish Gaelic: Uisge Alain) is a river in central Scotland. Rising in the Ochil Hills, it runs through Strathallan to Dunblane and Bridge of Allan before joining the River Forth. It is liable to cause floods in lower Bridge of Allan.

It shares its name with a tributary of the River Teviot. The name is similar to the Ale Water in Berwickshire, the River Alness in Ross-shire, the Allander Water in Stirlingshire, the River Alne and the Ayle Burn in Northumberland, the River Ellen in Cumbria, and several names in the south of England, Wales and Cornwall. Ptolemy, who wrote his Geography about 150 AD, gave the names of some of these rivers as Alauna or Alaunos. Ekwall says that Alauna or Alaunos are British [i.e. Brythonic or P-Celtic] river names. Nicolaisen says that the name Allan is of Pre-Celtic Indo-European origin. Its original form was Alauna, from the Indo-European root *el-/ol-, meaning "to flow, to stream". Several European rivers and settlements have names that may come from that root. Others say that Alauna was a Celtic river goddess, also found in Brittany; Alaunus was a Gaulish god of medicine and prophesy.

Two broadside ballads refer to the "Allan Water". According to one, a Scottish ballad, the "Allan Water's wide and deep, and my dear Anny's very bonny; Wides the Straith that lyes above't, if't were mine I'de give it all for Anny." The other, more familiar, English ballad begins "On the banks of Allan Water" and relates the death of a miller's daughter whose soldier lover proves untrue. This version, popularised by C. E. Horn in his comic opera, Rich and Poor (1812), is sung by Bathsheba Everdene at the sheepshearing supper in Thomas Hardy's novel Far From The Madding Crowd (1874). A similar rendition was recorded with church organ accompaniment by Italian singer Ariella Uliano in 2008.

== Industry ==
The river and its tributaries were once extensively used to power mills and factories. The major tributaries, the Muckle Burn and River Knaik, are mainly in hilly sheep farming terrain and no significant industrial use was made of them.

The Danny Burn tributary of the Allan, the Wauk Mill N890081 appears to have been a small corn mill belonging to a local farm. Very little remains. (Pan around the same external link to find the other locations.)

Progressing downstream, the mill buildings and weir at Kinbuck NN790051 still exist but are derelict. The weir NN785040 and some large mill buildings NN783038 at Ashfield still exist but are largely derelict.

There are two substantial weirs in Dunblane, at NN770017, feeding the Springbank Mill NN770016, which still exists but is no longer a mill, and at NN780014.

Downstream of Dunblane, a weir at NS785996 fed the long derelict Lower Keir Mill at NS785994.

At Bridge of Allan there are still in existence three very substantial weirs, the upper of which, NS786981, formerly supplied the Airthrey Mills NS786968, while the middle (NS786977) weir was positioned to collect the outfall from the Airthrey Mills as well as the main flow of the river. The lower weir is at NS788976, and the middle and lower weirs supplied a changing assortment of mills and factories as recently as the 1950s. The area is now occupied by housing but many traces of the mill lades can still be seen, and the flow of water over the weirs remains impressive.
