= Dunblane =

Town in Scotland

Coordinates: 56°11′18″N 3°57′51″W

Dunblane: Scottish Gaelic: Dùn Bhlàthain
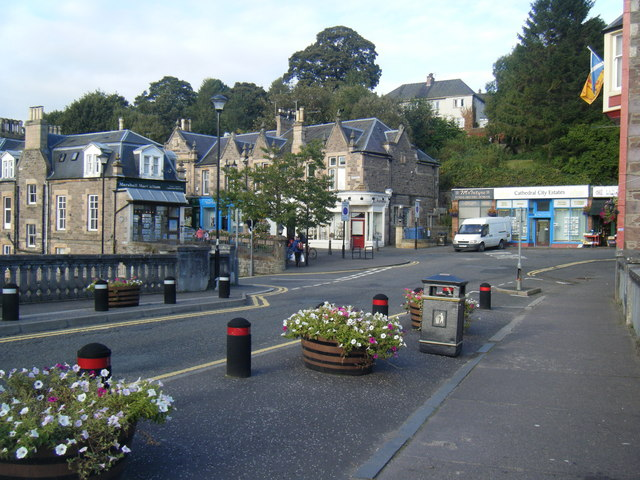
- Part of Dunblane town centre

- Location within the Stirling council area
- Population: 8,798 (2022)
- OS grid reference: NN779007
  - Edinburgh: 34 mi (55 km)
  - London: 359 mi (578 km)
- Community council: Dunblane
- Council area: Stirling
- Lieutenancy area: Stirling and Falkirk
- Country: Scotland
- Sovereign state: United Kingdom
- Post town: DUNBLANE
- Postcode district: FK15
- Dialling code: 01786
- Police: Scotland
- Fire: Scottish
- Ambulance: Scottish
- UK Parliament: Stirling and Strathallan
- Scottish Parliament: Clackmannanshire and Dunblane

Dunblane (/dʌnˈbleɪn/, Scottish Gaelic: Dùn Bhlàthain) is a historic cathedral town in the council area of Stirling, in central Scotland; it is inside the historic boundaries of the county of Perthshire. It is a commuter town, with many residents making use of good transport links to much of the Central Belt, including Glasgow and Edinburgh.

The town is built on the banks of the Allan Water (or River Allan), a tributary of the River Forth. Dunblane Cathedral is its most prominent landmark. It had a population of 8,114 at the 2001 census, which grew to 8,811 at the 2011 census; both of these figures were computed according to the 2010 definition of the locality. The population had later decreased to 8,798 in 2022.

== Toponymy ==
The most popular theory for the derivation of the name Dunblane is that it means "fort of Blane", commemorating Saint Blane (or Blán in Old Irish), an early Christian saint who lived probably in the late 6th century. His main seat was originally Kingarth on the Isle of Bute. He or his followers may have founded a church at Dunblane; the cult of Blán possibly came there with settlers from what is now Argyll in later centuries.

The earliest spellings of the name Dunblane are of the form Dul Blaan, the first element being a Pictish word for 'water meadow, haugh' which was borrowed into Scottish Gaelic. There are parallels to Dul Blaan in such Scottish place-names as Dalserf, Dalmarnock and Dalpatrick, all of which commemorate saints.

== History ==
The earliest evidence for Christianity on the site are two cross-slabs of the 10th to 11th centuries which are preserved in the cathedral. Incorporated into the later medieval building, but originally free-standing, is an 11th-century bell-tower, whose height was increased in the 15th century. The nave and aisleless choir date from the 13th century.

Dunblane did not have a rich or extensive medieval diocese (37 parishes), and so the cathedral is relatively modest in scale, but its refined architecture is much admired, as is its setting overlooking the valley of the Allan Water. After the Reformation, the nave of the cathedral was abandoned and soon became roofless and used for burials. The choir was retained as the parish church.

In 1715, the Battle of Sherriffmuir was fought on land very close to Dunblane. Many combatants were billeted in the town before the battle.

Dunblane railway station opened in 1848, as a stop on the Scottish Central Railway's Stirling to Perth line; it later served as a junction with another line to Callander that eventually reached Oban. This line was closed in 1965 during the Beeching axe.

During the boom years of the Hydropathy movement in the 19th century, Dunblane was the location of a successful hydropathic establishment. The nave of the cathedral was re-roofed between 1889 and 1893, with new furnishings provided by Robert Rowand Anderson.

Since the early 1970s the town has grown extensively and is now regarded as a highly sought-after commuter town due to its excellent road and rail links and good schools. Dunblane is close to the University of Stirling's campus at Bridge of Allan and is a popular location for academics.

=== Massacre ===
On 13 March 1996, local man Thomas Hamilton shot dead 16 children and their teacher, Gwen Mayor, in Dunblane Primary School's gymnasium before killing himself. He used his licensed weapons and ammunition.

There is a memorial to the 17 victims in the local cemetery and a cenotaph in the cathedral. There are also stained-glass windows in Church of the Holy Rude, St Blanes and Lecropt tempering the Children and their Teacher. The funds raised in the aftermath of the tragedy were used to build a new community centre (the Dunblane Centre). Following the incident, the government passed legislation banning ownership of most handguns—firearms under 60 centimetres (23.6 in) in overall length, in the United Kingdom.

Tennis players Jamie Murray and Andy Murray were in the school at the time of the massacre.

== Governance and status ==
The town was a royal burgh and part of Perthshire until the 1975 abolition of Scottish counties, from which point it became part of Stirling District in Central Region. In 1994, the regions were themselves abolished and Dunblane's only local authority became Stirling Council. Dunblane also has an active community council.

Until 1983, Dunblane was part of the Kinross and Western Perthshire constituency of the UK parliament, being represented by predominantly Unionist and Conservative MPs. After 1983, it became part of the Stirling constituency and, since then, has been represented by Conservative, Labour and SNP MPs. In the Scottish Parliament, Dunblane is part of the Clackmannanshire and Dunblane constituency and the Mid Scotland and Fife region. It shares a ward with Bridge of Allan in council elections.

Dunblane is often referred to as a city, due to the presence of Dunblane Cathedral; however, this status was never officially recognised.

== Amenities ==
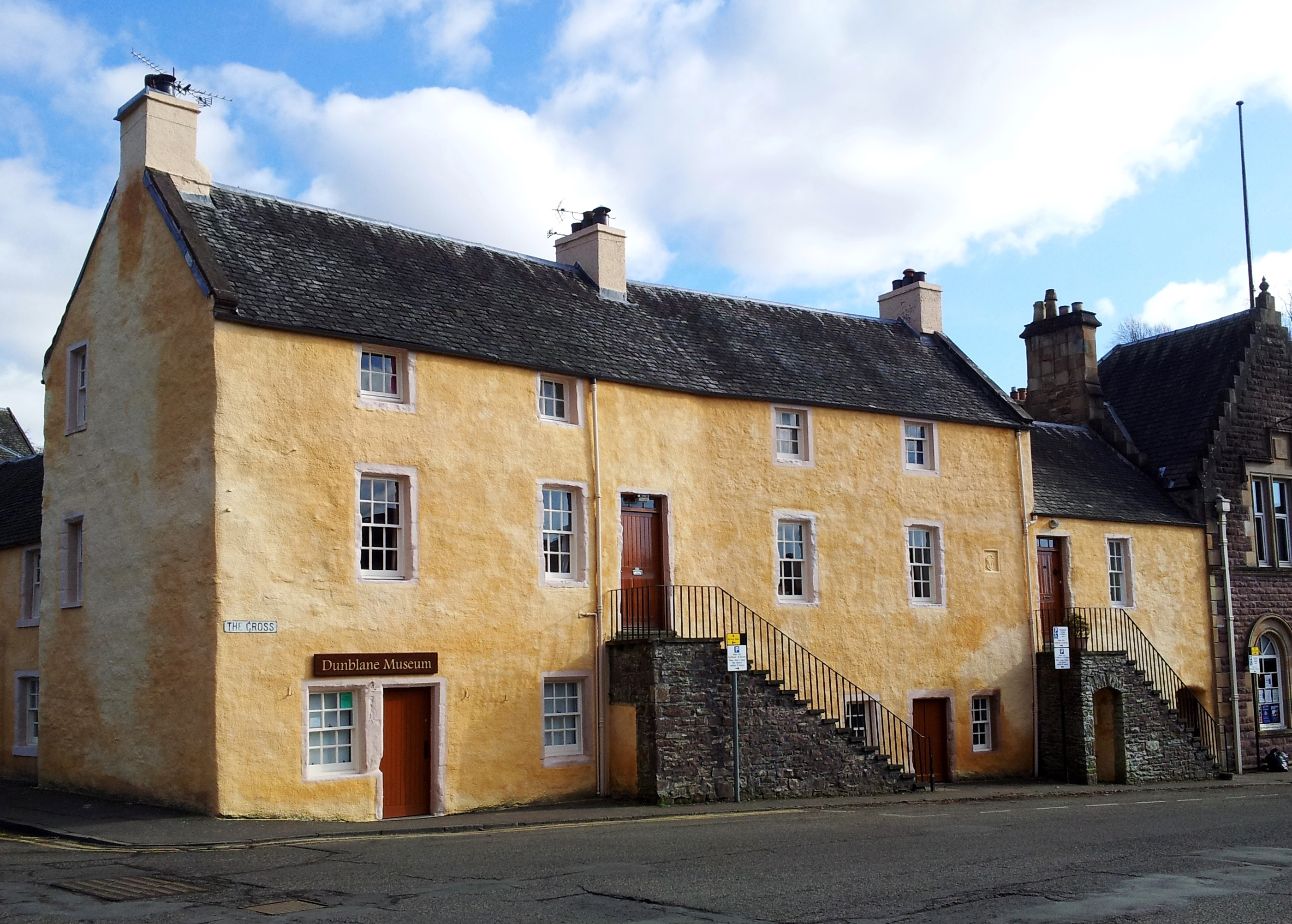
Dunblane Museum, 2003

=== Retail ===
Dunblane currently has two supermarkets: a Tesco (opened in 1996) and a M&S Foodhall (opened in 2009). Among other shops, the High Street has two independent butchers.

=== Religion ===
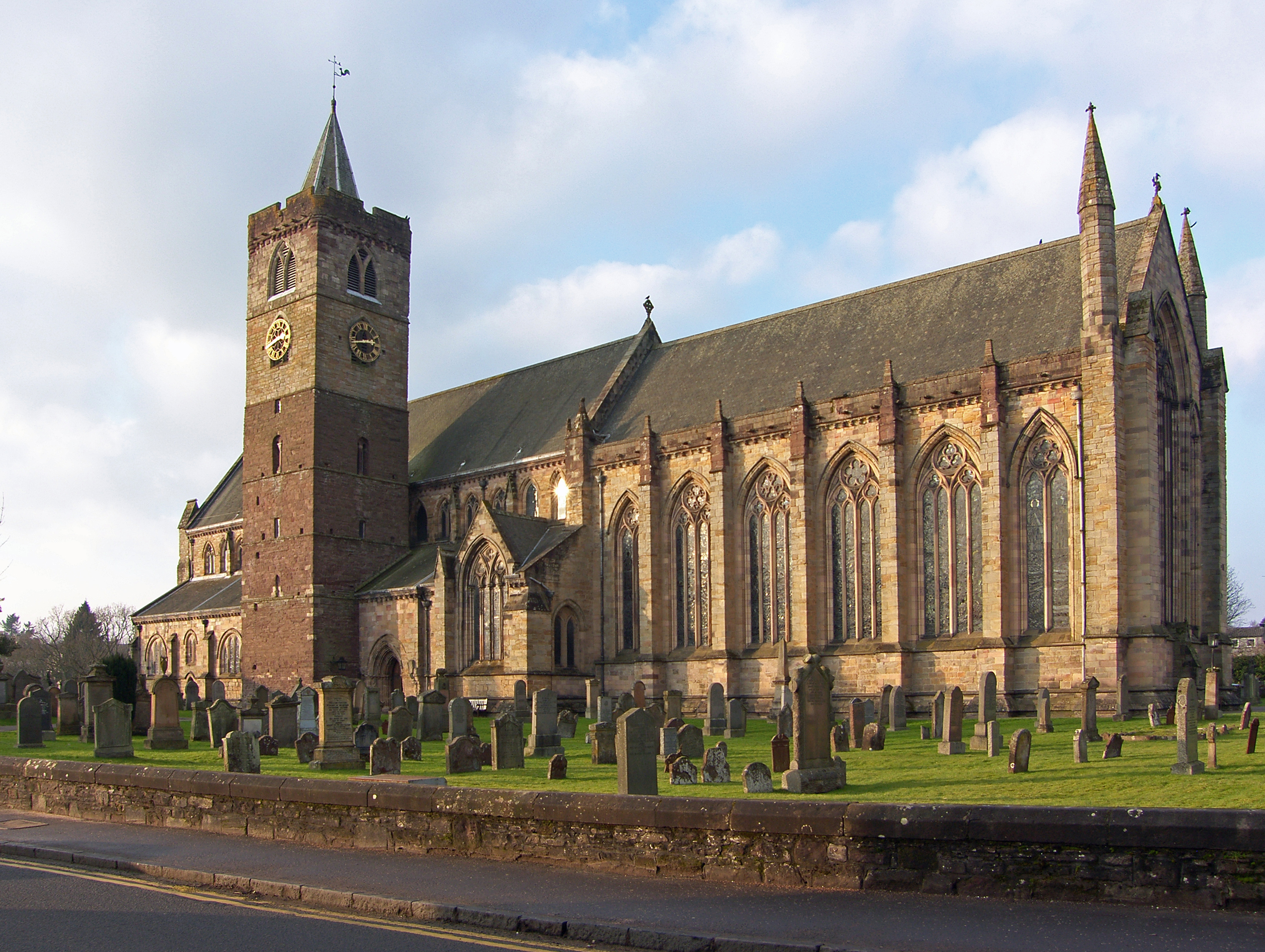
Dunblane Cathedral in February 2012

The town is home to the following churches and movements:

- Dunblane Cathedral – Church of Scotland
- St Blane's Church – Church of Scotland
- St Mary's Church – Scottish Episcopal Church
- Church of the Holy Family – Roman Catholic Church
- Free Church of Scotland
- Dunblane Christian Fellowship
- Community of St Nicholas – Eastern Orthodox Church.

Dunblane Cathedral is remarkable in having retained more of its late-medieval choir stalls than any other Scottish church building (except King's College Chapel in Aberdeen) and also is noted for its organ. Further fragments of medieval woodwork from the cathedral are displayed in the town's museum, formerly the Cathedral Museum, situated nearby. Though still used as a parish church, the building is in the care of Historic Scotland. To the south of the cathedral are some stone vaults of medieval origin, which are the only remaining fragment of the bishop's palace.

Adjacent to the cathedral, Scottish Churches House was (from the 1960s until its closure in 2011) a centre for ecumenical study and the former headquarters for Action of Churches Together in Scotland. It now operates as a hotel, featuring a medieval chapel in the grounds.

=== Leighton Library ===
The old town centre retains a number of historic buildings in addition to the cathedral, including the 17th century Leighton Library, the oldest private library in Scotland open to the public (on selected days in summer). A well-preserved late medieval town-house nearby (which was probably built as the manse of the Dean of the medieval cathedral) houses a local history museum (open in the summer; free entry). A modern extension has recently been completed within its interior courtyard to provide additional exhibition space and allow disabled access.

=== Dunblane Centre ===
The Dunblane Centre is a purpose-built youth, family, arts, sports and community centre. It was built after a community vote chose that option for money from a consolidation of several funds which were created in the aftermath of the 1996 tragedy. It opened in 2004 and receives no state finance, relying on user revenue and fundraising. It is run by the Dunblane Youth and Sports Centre Trust (Charity No. SC027397), with a board of trustees from the community.

=== Hotels ===
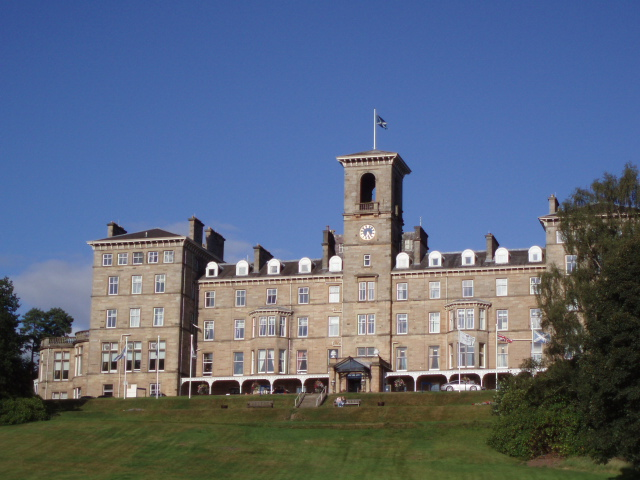
Dunblane Hydro Hotel

The north side of the town is dominated by the Dunblane Hydro Hotel, currently owned by Apex Hotels and operates under the DoubleTree brand for now. The Victorian building sits in wooded grounds on the top of a steep and wide grass slope. Dating from the late 19th century, it has been redeveloped and extended several times but still retains its main building relatively intact. It originally housed extensive spa and therapeutic bath facilities (like the other Scottish Hydros, such as Crieff and Peebles).

=== Clubs and societies ===
- 2284 Squadron City of Dunblane Air Cadets
- The Dunblane Local History Society
- The Dunblane Civic Society
- The 25th Stirling (Dunblane) Boys' Brigade
- Dunblane Soccer Club
- The Rubber Chicken Theatre – Dunblane's performing arts family
- The 4th/85th Dunblane Scout Group
- The Milvus Explorer Scout Unit
- Dunblane Development Trust.

== Education ==
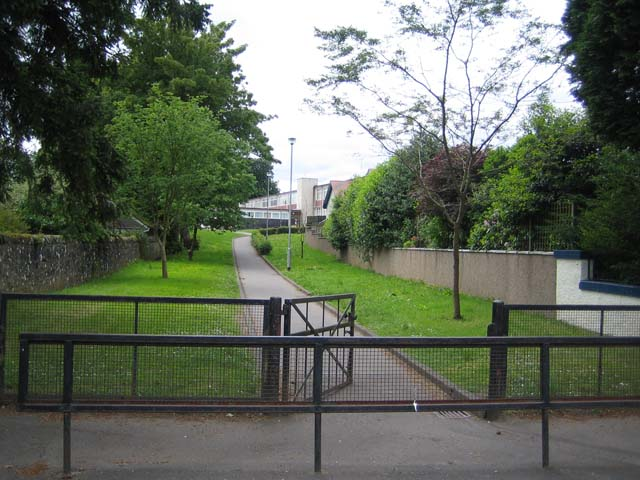
Dunblane Primary School, the site of the 1996 shooting massacre

Dunblane Primary School is on Doune Road, on the western side of Dunblane. The school has a large playing field (with a basketball court), regularly used for extra-curricular activities and by local clubs. A council-run nursery is attached to the school, in a separate building. As of 2022, it is the second largest primary school in Stirling Council with 395 students. In 1996, the school's gym was the scene of the Dunblane massacre. The school reopened within days, and the old gym was quickly demolished and replaced with an extension at the other end of the building. The former gym site became a memorial garden. Dunblane Primary's uniform consists of blue polo shirts and red jumpers (except Primary 7, whose jumpers are black). The colour of the school logo on jumpers varies by house. The houses are named after local castles; Airthrey (red), Doune (blue), Drummond (yellow) and Kilbryde (green).

St. Mary's Episcopal Primary School is the oldest and smallest primary school in Dunblane, located near the middle of the town. It has been on its current site in Smithy Loan (near the Fourways roundabout) since 1850. St Mary's was established as a church school for poor children under the incumbency of the first rector of St Mary's Episcopal Church, Canon Henry Malcolm. It was renovated and extended in 1997. St Mary's had two teachers until the 1970s. There are now four classes covering the seven primary years, plus a nursery class. The St Mary's uniform consists of blue polo shirts and green jumpers. The houses are Cromlix, Keir, Kilbryde and Kippenross. Newton Primary was opened in 1996. The name of the school comes from Newton Farm, which goes back as far as the Charter of 1655 when Oliver Cromwell confirmed James Pearson of Kippenross as the owner. The streets that encircle the school, Newton Crescent and Ochiltree (named after the Bishop of Dunblane from 1429 to 1447), are reflected in the logo of the school, which includes a tractor and a celtic cross. Around 440 pupils attend Newton Primary. Like the other two primary schools in Dunblane, it also has an attached nursery. Newton Primary's uniform consists of white polo shirts and royal blue jumpers; for Primary sevens, the uniform is slightly different, instead consisting of white polo shirts and a darker navy blue jumper. In 2019, the headteacher of Newton Primary died; since then, they have built a memorial building in remembrance.

Dunblane High School has roughly 1,000 pupils and 60 teachers; it is fed mainly by pupils from Dunblane's three primary schools. The school is in the south-west of Dunblane, on Old Doune Road. The current building was completed in November 2007, later being formally opened by Jamie Murray. It was constructed on the playing fields of the previous 1970s structure, the old campus being sold for residential development and the playing fields moved to the other side of the bypass. The current building includes some theatre facilities, a fitness suite, a dance studio, several pupil lounges and an all weather sports pitch that was originally built for the old building. The building was the first Public-Private Partnership school project in the Stirling Council area. Complaints were made that it had inadequate catering facilities and was the only Stirling school built without a swimming pool; the school has not had a library since 2011. The school has consistently performed well academically. In 2013, the school was listed in the top ten performing schools of Scotland relating to academic achievement, with well over three quarters of its roll progressing to higher education. In 2019, the school was named as Scotland's second best performing state school as 76% of school leavers had achieved five or more highers in 2018.

Dunblane High's uniform has been, since 2010, a white shirt with black trousers or skirt, Blu Tack blue knitwear and a royal blue blazer (or a black blazer with light blue braiding for S6). Ties vary by year group. The houses are Ramoyle (red), Sheriffmuir (yellow) and Kilbryde (blue). Queen Victoria School is a co-educational boarding school for children of those in the British Armed Forces, and is managed and funded by the Ministry of Defence. It is situated roughly 1 mile (2 km) north of the town centre, in a secluded area overlooking the A9. The school's chapel is a notable example of Scottish medieval revival architecture, based on the 14th century Dominican (later parish) church of St Monans in Fife.

== Transport ==
=== Train ===
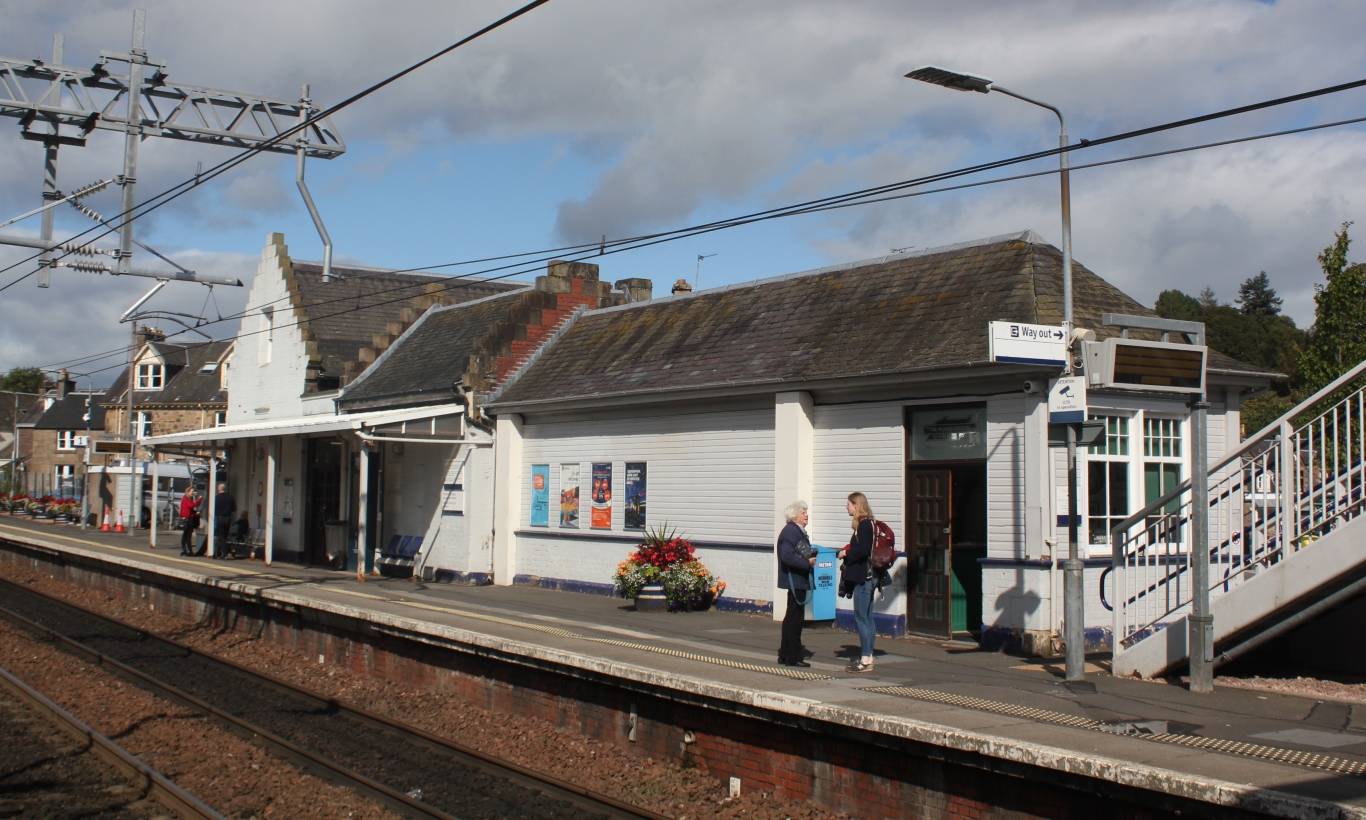
A view of the station building and a platform at Dunblane station

Dunblane railway station is served by three train operating companies:

- ScotRail operates regular services to Dundee, Edinburgh Waverley, Falkirk Grahamston, Glasgow Queen Street, Perth and Stirling
- Caledonian Sleeper operates a daily sleeper service in each direction between Inverness and London Euston
- London North Eastern Railway operates one service that stops here on Sundays to London King's Cross.

As of 2018, Dunblane is the northernmost electrified station on the British railway network.

The station was also the junction for services over the scenically attractive route to Doune, Callander and Crianlarich, where the line joined the still-extant line from Glasgow to Oban. The route to Oban, via the popular Callander line, closed in 1965.

=== Bus ===
Local bus services are operated predominantly by Stagecoach South Scotland and Scottish Citylink; routes connect the town with Edinburgh, Perth and Stirling.

=== Road ===
Dunblane is the point at which the M9 motorway ends and joins the A9 dual carriageway north towards Perth. The A9 formerly went through the centre of Dunblane, but a bypass was completed in 1991 and the old road became the B8033. The rapid expansion of the town has led to a large increase in local car usage, resulting in considerable parking problems.

== Notable former and current residents ==
- Lady Elish Angiolini (born 1960), Lord Clerk Register and former Lord Advocate
- Fiona Brown (born 1995), footballer
- Alexander Buchan (1829–1907), meteorologist
- Christina Chalk, beauty pageant titleholder
- Katharine Brown (born 1987), beauty pageant titleholder
- Ebenezer Bryce (1830–1913), namesake for Bryce Canyon National Park
- Andrew Butchart (born 1991), athlete
- Alex Christie (1873–1954), football player
- Robert Main Christie (1865–1918), football player
- Keith Cochrane (born 1965), businessman
- Callum Davidson (born 1976), football player
- James Gillespie Graham (1776–1855), architect
- James Huffam (1897–1968), recipient of the Victoria Cross
- Patrick Hutchison (1741–1802), Presbyterian minister
- Helen Kirk (1827–1895), reformer and temperance worker
- Robert Leighton (1611–1684), Bishop of Dunblane from 1661 and founder of the Leighton Library
- Johnny McGuire (1893–1962), football player
- Dougie MacLean (born 1954), musician
- Sir Andy Murray (born 1987), tennis player
- Jamie Murray (born 1986), tennis player
- Judy Murray (born 1959), tennis player/coach
- Kit Napier (1943–2019), football player
- Len Pennie (born 1999), poet
- George Robertson (born 1946), politician & former Secretary General of NATO
- Kyle Rowe (born 1998), rugby player
- Sir Reo Stakis (1913–2001), hotel magnate
- Patrick James Stirling (1809–1891), lawyer and economics author
- Andrew Swift (born 1968), Bishop of Brechin
- Steven Turnbull (born 1987), rugby player.
