= List of the Stone Roses live performances =

The Stone Roses, an alternative rock band from Manchester, have had concerts and other live performances in Europe, North America, Australia, and Asia.

== Tour dates ==
Date	City	Country	Venue
23 October 1984	London	United Kingdom	Hampstead Moonlight Club
21 November 1984	Exeter	United Kingdom	Labour Club
22 November 1984	Kensington	United Kingdom	Ad-lib Club
14 December 1984	Kensington	United Kingdom	Ad-lib Club
4 January 1985	Fulham	United Kingdom	The Greyhound
13 January 1985	Manchester	United Kingdom	Piccadilly Radio Session
19 January 1985	London	United Kingdom	Marquee Club
8 February 1985	London	United Kingdom	Dingwalls
20 February 1985	Nottingham	United Kingdom	The Maze
29 March 1985	Preston	United Kingdom	Clouds
10 April 1985	Linköping	Sweden	Bing Bang Club
11 April 1985	Norrköping	Sweden	Olympia
19 April 1985	Stockholm	Sweden	Lilla Marquee
25 April 1985	Stockholm	Sweden	Kolingsborg
26 April 1985	Stockholm	Sweden	Lidingö Stad
30 April 1985	Stockholm	Sweden	Lidingö Stad
10 May 1985	Manchester	United Kingdom Ireland	The International I
14 May 1985	Manchester	United Kingdom Ireland	The Gallery
4 July 1985	London	United Kingdom Ireland	The Underground
20 July 1985	Manchester	United Kingdom Ireland	Flower Show I
10 August 1985	London	United Kingdom Ireland	Marquee Club
15 August 1985	Manchester	United Kingdom Ireland	The Haçienda
24 August 1985	London	United Kingdom Ireland	The Marquee Club
27 August 1985	Manchester	United Kingdom Ireland	The Haçienda
11 September 1985	London	United Kingdom Ireland	Embassy Club
26 October 1985	London	United Kingdom Ireland	The Riverside
2 November 1985	Manchester	United Kingdom Ireland	Manchester University
22 November 1985	Manchester	United Kingdom Ireland	Manchester University
30 November 1985	Manchester	United Kingdom Ireland	Flower Show 2
5 March 1986	Blackburn	United Kingdom Ireland	King George's Hall
25 March 1986	Warwick	United Kingdom Ireland	Warwick University
10 May 1986	Manchester	United Kingdom Ireland	Manchester University
24 May 1986	Warwick	United Kingdom Ireland	Warwick University
31 May 1986	Dublin	United Kingdom Ireland	McGonagles
6 June 1986	Leeds	United Kingdom	The Warehouse
5 July 1986	London	United Kingdom	The Three Crows Club
7 July 1986	Manchester	United Kingdom	The Ritz
11 August 1986	Liverpool	United Kingdom	Mardi Gras Club with local band Innervision
14 August 1986	Barrow	United Kingdom	Bluebird Club
2 November 1986	Manchester	United Kingdom	Manchester University
30 January 1987	Manchester	United Kingdom	The International I
30 May 1987	Manchester	United Kingdom	The International I
26 June 1987	Manchester	United Kingdom	The International I
3 July 1987	Sheffield	United Kingdom	Take Two
17 July 1987	Liverpool	United Kingdom	Planet X
25 July 1987	Hull	United Kingdom	Adelphi
27 July 1987	London	United Kingdom	Dingwalls
31 July 1987	Greenwich	United Kingdom	The Tunnel
11 August 1987	Liverpool	United Kingdom	Sefton Park
13 November 1987	Manchester	United Kingdom	The International I
7 December 1987	London	United Kingdom	Dingwalls
23 January 1988	London	United Kingdom	Dingwalls (Supporting The La's)
26 February 1988	Manchester	United Kingdom	International 1
27 February 1988	Sheffield	United Kingdom	Leadmill (supporting The Jack Rubies)
29 February 1988	London	United Kingdom	Dingwalls
4 March 1988	Warrington	United Kingdom	Legends
11 March 1988	Manchester Tonbridge Manchester	United Kingdom	The International I
13 May 1988	Manchester Tonbridge Manchester	United Kingdom	Angel Centre
30 May 1988	Manchester Tonbridge Manchester	United Kingdom	International 2
25 August 1988	Manchester	United Kingdom	International 1
27 October 1988	Manchester	United Kingdom	Manchester Polytechnic
11 November 1988	London	United Kingdom	City Of London Polytechnic
14 November 1988	Bristol	United Kingdom	Bristol Polytechnic
17 November 1988	London	United Kingdom	Kingston Polytechnic
18 November 1988	Warrington	United Kingdom	Legends
19 November 1988	Manchester	United Kingdom	International 2
20 November 1988	Birmingham	United Kingdom	Cod Club
26 November 1988	St Helens	United Kingdom	Citadel
29 November 1988	Chester	United Kingdom	Olivers
2 December 1988	London	United Kingdom	London School of Economics
6 December 1988	Belfast	United Kingdom	Belfast Art College
7 December 1988	Belfast	United Kingdom	Belfast University
8 December 1988	Coleraine	United Kingdom	University Of Ulster
11 December 1988	Edinburgh	United Kingdom	The Venue
12 December 1988	Greenock	United Kingdom	Ricos (Cancelled)
17 February 1989	Warrington	United Kingdom	Legends
20 February 1989	Sheffield	United Kingdom	Sheffield University
23 February 1989	Hendon	United Kingdom	Middlesex Polytechnic
24 February 1989	Warrington	United Kingdom	Legends
27 February 1989	Manchester	United Kingdom	The Haçienda
28 February 1989	Brighton	United Kingdom	Escape Club
1 March 1989	Bradford	United Kingdom	Club Rio
2 March 1989	Cardiff	United Kingdom	The Venue
3 March 1989	Warrington	United Kingdom	Legends
11 March 1989	Aldershot	United Kingdom	Buzz Club
15 March 1989	London	United Kingdom	Powerhaus
17 March 1989	Sunderland	United Kingdom	Kazbah
18 March 1989	Dudley	United Kingdom	JBs
28 April 1989	Portsmouth	United Kingdom	South Parade Pier
29 April 1989	Uxbridge	United Kingdom	Brunel University London
4 May 1989	Liverpool	United Kingdom	Liverpool Polytechnic
5 May 1989	Widnes	United Kingdom	Queen's Hall
6 May 1989	Manchester	United Kingdom	International II
7 May 1989	Sheffield	United Kingdom	Sheffield University
8 May 1989	Leeds	United Kingdom	Warehouse
11 May 1989	Nottingham	United Kingdom	Trent Polytechnic
12 May 1989	Dudley	United Kingdom	JBs
13 May 1989	Tonbridge	United Kingdom	Angel Centre
15 May 1989	London	United Kingdom	ICA
17 May 1989	Birmingham	United Kingdom	Edwards Number Eight (Cancelled due to inadequate PA)
19 May 1989	Aberystwyth	United Kingdom	Aberystwyth University
22 May 1989	London	United Kingdom	Dingwalls
24 May 1989	Oxford	United Kingdom	Oxford Polytechnic
25 May 1989	Shrewsbury	United Kingdom	Fridge (took place at the Park Lane)
26 May 1989	Milton Keynes	United Kingdom	Elektra (cancelled due to recording)
27 May 1989	St Helens	United Kingdom	Citadel (cancelled due to recording)
30 May 1989	Preston	United Kingdom	Guildhall Foyer
3 June 1989	Walsall	United Kingdom	Junction 10
6 June 1989	Reading	United Kingdom	Majestic
7 June 1989	Leicester	United Kingdom	Leicester University
8 June 1989	Lancaster	United Kingdom	Sugarhouse
20 June 1989	Newcastle	United Kingdom	Riverside
21 June 1989	Edinburgh	United Kingdom	Venue
22 June 1989	Glasgow	United Kingdom	Rooftop
23 June 1989	Middlesbrough	United Kingdom	Town Hall
24 June 1989	Northampton	United Kingdom	Roadmenders
25 June 1989	Norwich	United Kingdom	Norwich Arts Centre
26 June 1989	Bristol	United Kingdom	Bierkeller
27 June 1989	Stratford-upon-Avon	United Kingdom	Civic Hall
28 June 1989	Birmingham		Irish Centre
30 June 1989	Leeds		Polytechnic
12 August 1989	Blackpool		Empress Ballroom
23 September 1989	Valencia	Spain	Barraca
28 September 1989	Milan	Italy	Rolling Stone Festival
1 October 1989	Deinze	Belgium	Futurama
3 October 1989	Hamburg	West Germany	Club Logo
4 October 1989	Cologne	West Germany	Luxor Club
10 October 1989	Amsterdam	Netherlands	Melkweg
12 October 1989	Paris	France	Les Inrockuptibles Festival at La Cigalle
23 October 1989	Kawasaki	Japan	Club Citta
24 October 1989	Tokyo	Japan	Kan-1 Hoken Hall
25 October 1989	Osaka	Japan	Mainichi Hall
27 October 1989	Tokyo	Japan	Nihon Seinenkan
18 November 1989	London	United Kingdom	Alexandra Palace
21 November 1989	London	United Kingdom	The Late Show BBC2
23 November 1989	London	United Kingdom	Top of the Pops BBC1
15 May 1990	Copenhagen	Denmark	The Station
16 May 1990	Lund	Sweden	Mejeriet
17 May 1990	Stockholm	Sweden	Fryshuset
19 May 1990	Oslo	Norway	The Voice
27 May 1990	Widnes	United Kingdom	Spike Island
3 June 1990	Seinäjoki	Finland	Provinssirock Festival
7 June 1990	Belfast	United Kingdom	Maysfield Leisure Centre
9 June 1990	Glasgow	United Kingdom	Glasgow Green
19 April 1995	Oslo	Norway	Rockefeller Music Hall
20 April 1995	Stockholm	Sweden	Palladium
21 April 1995	Gothenburg	Sweden	Kåren
22 April 1995	Copenhagen	Denmark	Pakhus 2
24 April 1995	Hamburg	Germany	Docks
25 April 1995	Berlin	Germany	Metropol
26 April 1995	Amsterdam	Netherlands	Paradiso
27 April 1995	Brussels	Belgium	La Luna
29 April 1995	Cologne	Germany	E-Werk
1 May 1995	Zurich	Switzerland	Volkshaus
2 May 1995	Milan	Italy	City Square
3 May 1995	Rome	Italy	Palladium
5 May 1995	Toulouse	France	Le Bikini
7 May 1995	Madrid	Spain	Aqualung
8 May 1995	Barcelona	Spain	Zeleste
9 May 1995	Lyon	France	Le Transbordeur
11 May 1995	Paris	France	Élysée Montmartre
14 May 1995	Atlanta	United States	Midtown Music Festival
17 May 1995	Washington, D.C.	United States	Gaston Hall (relocated to Radio Music Hall)
18 May 1995	Toronto	Canada	Marine Terminals
20 May 1995	New York City	United States	Manhattan Ballroom
21 May 1995	Boston	United States	Avalon Club
22 May 1995	New York City	United States	Webster Hall
24 May 1995	Philadelphia	United States	Trocadero Theatre
26 May 1995	St. Louis	United States	Pointfest
27 May 1995	Tinley Park	United States	World Music Theater
29 May 1995	Los Angeles	United States	Hollywood Palladium
31 May 1995	San Francisco	United States	The Fillmore
30 July 1995	Stockholm	Sweden	Lollipop Festival
31 July 1995	Tampere	Finland	Tullikamari Club
1 August 1995	Helsinki	Finland	Tavastia Club
2 August 1995	Helsinki	Finland	Tavastia Club
5 August 1995	Cork	Ireland	Féile Festival
1 September 1995	Somerset	United Kingdom	Pilton Playing Fields
11 September 1995	Kawasaki	Japan	Club Citta
12 September 1995	Tokyo	Japan	Nippon Budokan
13 September 1995	Tokyo	Japan	Nippon Budokan
15 September 1995	Okinawa	Japan	Convention Theater
17 September 1995	Osaka	Japan	IMP Hall
18 September 1995	Nagoya	Japan	Century Hall
20 September 1995	Hiroshima	Japan	Yuubin Chokin Hall
21 September 1995	Fukuoka	Japan	Fukuoka Sunpalace
24 September 1995	Osaka	Japan	IMP Hall
25 September 1995	Osaka	Japan	IMP Hall
27 September 1995	Sapporo	Japan	Factory Hall
28 September 1995	Kawasaki	Japan	Club Citta
1 October 1995	Brisbane	Australia	Brisbane Festival Hall
2 October 1995	Sydney	Australia	Enmore Theatre
3 October 1995	Sydney	Australia	Enmore Theatre
5 October 1995	Melbourne	Australia	Metro
7 October 1995	Adelaide	Australia	Thebarton Theatre
8 October 1995	Perth	Australia	The Metropolis
9 October 1995	Perth	Australia	The Metropolis
28 November 1995	Bridlington	United Kingdom	Spa Theatre
30 November 1995	Wolverhampton	United Kingdom	Wolverhampton Civic Hall
1 December 1995	Cambridge	United Kingdom	Cambridge Corn Exchange
2 December 1995	Brighton	United Kingdom	Brighton Centre
4 December 1995	Newport	United Kingdom	Newport Centre
5 December 1995	Exeter	United Kingdom	Exeter University
7 December 1995	Leicester	United Kingdom	De Montfort Hall
8 December 1995	London	United Kingdom	Brixton Academy
9 December 1995	London	United Kingdom	Brixton Academy
11 December 1995	Reading	United Kingdom	Rivermead
12 December 1995	Norwich	United Kingdom	University of East Anglia
13 December 1995	Leeds	United Kingdom	Town and Country
15 December 1995	Liverpool	United Kingdom	Royal Court
16 December 1995	Whitley Bay	United Kingdom	Ice Rink
17 December 1995	Aberdeen	United Kingdom	Music Hall
19 December 1995	Glasgow	United Kingdom	Barrowlands
20 December 1995	Glasgow	United Kingdom	Barrowlands
22 December 1995	Manchester	United Kingdom	Apollo
23 December 1995	Manchester	United Kingdom	Apollo
27 December 1995	Sheffield	United Kingdom	Sheffield Arena
29 December 1995	London	United Kingdom	Wembley Arena
2 August 1996	Benicàssim	Spain	Festival Internacional de Benicàssim
10 August 1996	Vilar de Mouros	Portugal	Vilar de Mouros Festival
11 August 1996	Skanderborg	Denmark	Skanderborg Festival
25 August 1996	Reading	United Kingdom	Reading Festival

=== 2012 ===
On 18 October 2011, the Stone Roses called a press conference to confirm their reunion and two homecoming shows at Heaton Park, Manchester on 29 and 30 June 2012. They also stated their intention to complete a reunion world tour and an album of new material.

Date	City	Country	Venue
23 May 2012	Warrington	United Kingdom	Parr Hall
8 June 2012	Barcelona	Spain	Razzmatazz
9 June 2012	Barcelona	Spain	Razzmatazz
12 June 2012	Amsterdam	Netherlands	Heineken Music Hall
14 June 2012	Hultsfred	Sweden	Folkets Park
16 June 2012	Aarhus	Denmark	Ådalen
22 June 2012	Scheeßel	Germany	Eichenring
24 June 2012	Neuhausen ob Eck	Germany	Neuhausen ob Eck Airfield
25 June 2012	Lyon	France	Théâtre antique de Fourvière
29 June 2012	Manchester	United Kingdom	Heaton Park
30 June 2012	Manchester	United Kingdom	Heaton Park
1 July 2012	Manchester	United Kingdom	Heaton Park
5 July 2012	Dublin	Ireland	Phoenix Park
7 July 2012	Balado	United Kingdom	Balado Park & Airfield (T in the Park 2012)
13 July 2012	Lisbon	Portugal	Passeio Maritimo de Alges
14 July 2012	Benicàssim	Spain	Costa del Azahar
17 July 2012	Milan	Italy	Ippodromo del Galoppo
22 July 2012	Singapore	Singapore	Singapore Indoor Stadium
24 July 2012	Hong Kong	Hong Kong	AsiaWorld-Arena
27 July 2012	Yuzawa	Japan	Naeba Ski Resort
29 July 2012	Icheon	South Korea	Jisan Valley Ski Resort
6 August 2012	London	United Kingdom	Village Underground
8 August 2012	Oslo	Norway	Middelalderparken
10 August 2012	Budapest	Hungary	Óbuda Island
17 August 2012	Kiewit	Belgium	Pukkelpop
18 August 2012	Chelmsford	United Kingdom	Hylands Park
19 August 2012	Weston-under-Lizard	United Kingdom	Weston Park
22 August 2012	Belfast	United Kingdom	Boucher Road Playing Field
21 February 2013	Dubai	United Arab Emirates	Dubai Media City Amphitheatre
23 February 2013	Jakarta	Indonesia	Lapangan D-Senayan
26 February 2013	Auckland	New Zealand	Vector Arena
1 March 2013	Brisbane	Australia	Riverstage
2 March 2013	Brisbane	Australia	Doomben Racecourse
3 March 2013	Perth	Australia	Arena Joondalup
6 March 2013	Sydney	Australia	Hordern Pavilion
7 March 2013	Melbourne	Australia	Festival Hall
9 March 2013	Sydney	Australia	Royal Randwick Racecourse
10 March 2013	Melbourne	Australia	Flemington Racecourse
11 March 2013	Adelaide	Australia	Bonython Park
9 April 2013	Mexico City	Mexico	The Pepsi Center WTC
12 April 2013	Indio	United States	Coachella
19 April 2013	Indio	United States	Coachella
3 June 2013	Paris	France	La Cigale
4 June 2013	Paris	France	La Cigale
7 June 2013	London	United Kingdom	Finsbury Park
8 June 2013	London	United Kingdom	Finsbury Park
14 June 2013	Newport	United Kingdom	Seaclose Park
15 June 2013	Glasgow	United Kingdom	Glasgow Green
9 August 2013	Chiba	Japan	Makuhari Messe
11 August 2013	Osaka	Japan	Maishima

== Further live dates ==
Several years after the initial reunion tour, the Stone Roses again came together to play a series of shows.

Date	City	Country	Venue
7 June 2016	Halifax	United Kingdom	Victoria Theatre
8 June 2016	Carlisle	United Kingdom	The Sands Centre
15 June 2016	Manchester	United Kingdom	City of Manchester Stadium
17 June 2016	Manchester	United Kingdom	City of Manchester Stadium
18 June 2016	Manchester	United Kingdom	City of Manchester Stadium
19 June 2016	Manchester	United Kingdom	City of Manchester Stadium
30 June 2016	New York City	United States	Madison Square Garden
8 July 2016	Strathallan	United Kingdom	T in the Park 2016
9 July 2016	Dublin	Ireland	Marlay Park
12 December 2016	Sydney	Australia	Sydney Opera House
13 December 2016	Sydney	Australia	Sydney Opera House
14 December 2016	Sydney	Australia	Sydney Opera House
21 April 2017	Tokyo	Japan	Nippon Budokan
22 April 2017	Tokyo	Japan	Nippon Budokan
13 June 2017	Belfast	United Kingdom	SSE Arena
17 June 2017	London	United Kingdom	Wembley Stadium
20 June 2017	Leeds	United Kingdom	First Direct Arena
21 June 2017	Leeds	United Kingdom	First Direct Arena
24 June 2017	Glasgow	United Kingdom	Hampden Park
