= Echo Machine =

Synth-pop band from Dundee, Scotland

- Origin: Dundee, Scotland, United Kingdom
- Genres: Synth-Pop
- Years active: 2018–2025
- Members: Gary Moore; Michael "John" McFarlane; Hannah McKay; Lewis Bage; Heather McKay

Echo Machine were a synth-pop band from Dundee, Scotland. The band consisted of Gary Moore on vocals, Michael 'John' McFarlane on guitar and synths, Lewis Bage on synths, Hannah McKay on drums, and Heather McKay on bass.

== History ==
The band were formed by Moore, McFarlane and bassist Ben Doherty who had previously played together in The Mirror Trap and continue to be represented by Dave McLean of Riverman Bangkok. The new band moved away from the indie rock sound of The Mirror Trap, embracing a queer, synth-pop aesthetic that was a clear departure when debuted at their first live performance in summer 2018 at Dundee's Conroy's Basement (now Rad Apples). This led The Skinny to name them as a band to watch. Echo Machine said of their influences, "We definitely get our kicks from overblown 80s electro pop, from Depeche Mode to Duran Duran, OMD, the Pet Shop Boys, and Tears for Fears, but probably get equal joy from loud alternative rock like Pixies, QOTSA, Nirvana, Placebo, Idlewild and Mclusky. Then add in the stuff that we love, but could never try to emulate, like Frank Ocean, Angel Olsen, Weyes Blood, Danny Brown and Kate Tempest.

In 2019 the band were on the bill of the Atlas Weekend festival in Ukraine. They also played the King Tut's Summer Nights Festival in 2019 and 2022. In addition to performing live, the band released a number of singles in their first year together, many of which arrived with accompanying videos. Debut single St Elmo was followed by Vibrations, Chameleon and Automatic Love, the latter being reviewed as a 'bruising, belter of a song'. In addition to these videos, Echo Machine collaborated with Thai singer Janine Alissa Wollmann on a cover of the Billie Eilish track Bad Guy, producing an accompanying music video. Their single 'Headlights' was also well-reviewed, being described as 'infectious discowave'. The success of the band in 2019 prompted BBC radio presenter, Vic Galloway, to name the band as one of his 25 Scottish Artists to Watch in 2020. Following the departure of Ben Doherty, sisters Heather and Hannah McKay (ex-The Amorettes) joined the band on bass and drums respectively. The November 2020 video for the band's cover of Kino's 'перемен' ('Peremen') was the first to feature Hannah and Heather.

In March 2025, Moore announced via the band's Instagram page that the band had dissolved.

== Instant Transmissions (2020) ==
Echo Machine's debut album, Instant Transmissions, was released on 28 February 2020. The album reached number 9 on the UK Record Store Chart and number 14 on the Scottish Chart. The band made a number of music videos to accompany singles from the album, including "The Road" (shot and directed by Dundee cinematographer Stephen Grant and edited by Khaled Spiewak), "Automatic Love" (directed by Troy Nelson of Dundee's Magic Box Studios in the style of a 1980s Top of the Pops appearance), and "Chameleon" (also directed by Troy Nelson).

== Accidental Euphoria (2024) ==
The band's second album, Accidental Euphoria, was released in 2024. It reached number 2 in Scotland, number 5 in the UK Record Store Chart and number 13 in the UK Independent Albums Chart.
