= Born to Break =

Studio album by The Amorettes
- Released: 6 April 2018
- Recorded: September–October 2017; Rockfield Studios
- Genre: Hard rock
- Label: SPV GmbH / Steamhammer
- Producer: Luke Morley

The Amorettes chronology
White Hot Heat (2016)	Born to Break (2018)

Singles from Born to Break
- 1. "Everything I Learned I Learned from Rock and Roll" Released: 16 February 2018; 2. "Whatever Gets You Through the Night" Released: 13 July 2018; 3. "Born to Break" Released: 2 November 2018

Born to Break is the fourth studio album by Scottish hard rock band The Amorettes, released on 6 April 2018. On 13 April, the album charted at number 13 on the Scottish Albums Chart.

== Recording ==
For their fourth album, The Amorettes retained the production personnel used on their previous album, White Hot Heat, released in 2016. Producer Luke Morley of Thunder was joined by engineer Nick Brine (The Darkness, Bruce Springsteen) for the recording sessions which took place at Rockfield Studios in Wales.

All the tracks on the album were composed by lead guitarist and vocalist Gill Montgomery, although the lyrics for "Everything I Learned I Learned from Rock and Roll", the first single from the album, were written by Black Star Riders frontman Ricky Warwick. Warwick said the song was "based on personal experience, and a nod to some of the great artists out there who have shaped and defined our rock n roll identity." Three other tracks on the album were co-written with Morley.

== Reception ==
Describing the band as "the best band out of Scotland since The Almighty", Neil Johnson of Louder Than War cited the "more refined and considered songcraft" of Born to Break compared to its predecessor, describing it as "honest to goodness, spit and sawdust rock 'n' roll".

Gerald Stansbury of Über Rock described the album as diverse, and rising high above the band's previous records. Focusing on the album's strong riffs, catchy choruses and outstanding performances from all three members of the band, he described Born to Break as "a classic album that will be an album of the year contender".

On 16 February 2018, the band released the first single from the album, "Everything I Learned I Learned from Rock and Roll", which was voted Classic Rock's track of the week for the last week of March, and was performed on Live at Five on Scottish television channel STV2 on 4 April.

The second single from Born to Break, "Whatever Gets You Through the Night", was released on 13 July. The song received the band's first national radio airplay on 9 July, on Johnnie Walker's Rock Show on BBC Radio 2. A third single, "Born to Break", was released on 2 November.

== Track listing ==
No.	Title	Writer(s)	Length
1.	"Can You Feel the Fire?"	Gill Montgomery	4:40
2.	"Hello and Goodbye"	Montgomery	3:47
3.	"Everything I Learned I Learned from Rock and Roll"	Montgomery, Ricky Warwick	4:03
4.	"Born to Break"	Montgomery	3:46
5.	"Whatever Gets You Through the Night"	Montgomery, Luke Morley	4:03
6.	"Hell or High Water"	Montgomery	4:11
7.	"You Still Got Rock and Roll"	Montgomery	3:56
8.	"Easy Tiger"	Montgomery	3:21
9.	"Bat Shit Crazy"	Montgomery	3:59
10.	"Comin' Up the Middle"	Montgomery	3:41
11.	"High on Your Energy"	Montgomery, Morley	3:38
12.	"Want It Bad"	Montgomery, Morley	4:24

== Personnel ==
- Gill Montgomery – guitar, vocals
- Heather McKay – bass guitar, backing vocals
- Hannah McKay – drums, backing vocals
- Luke Morley – production
- Nick Brine – engineering and mixing
- Pete Maher – mastering
- Gill Montgomery – artwork
- Chris Childs – artwork support
- Geordy Van Velzen – photography

== Charts ==
Chart (2018)	Peak position
UK Rock & Metal Albums (OCC)	4
Scottish Albums (OCC)	13
UK Independent Albums (OCC)	16
