= The Amorettes =

Scottish hard rock band

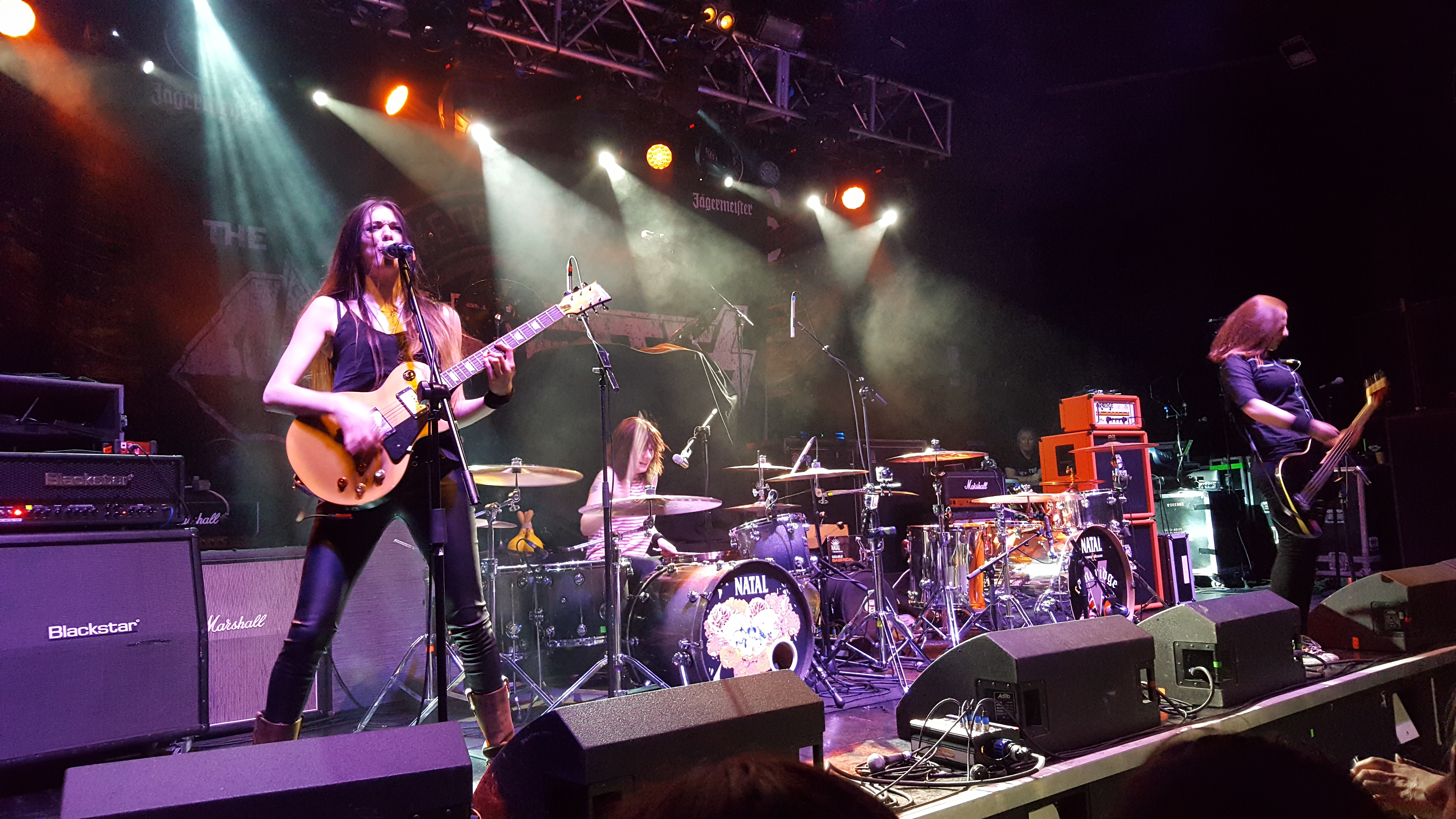
- The Amorettes performing in Bristol, 14 April 2018

Background information
- Origin: West Lothian, Scotland
- Genres: Hard rock
- Years active: 2009–2019
- Label: SPV GmbH / Steamhammer
- Past members: Gill Montgomery; Hannah McKay; Heather McKay; Laurie Buchanan; Josie O'Toole; Jacinta Jaye
- Website: www.theamorettes.com

The Amorettes were a hard rock band formed in Scotland in 2009. They performed in support of Black Star Riders, Europe, W.A.S.P., Ash, The Dead Daisies, Black Stone Cherry, Gun and Thunder among others, toured across the UK, and performed in several countries throughout Europe.

The Amorettes released their first album, Haulin' Ass, in 2010. Their second album, Game On, which was produced by Chris Tsangarides, followed in 2015. The band's third album, White Hot Heat, released on 27 June 2016, was produced by Thunder's Luke Morley. The album features songwriting input by Morley and Black Star Riders frontman Ricky Warwick.

Haulin' Ass was repackaged and reissued with two bonus tracks on 16 June 2017. The band's fourth album, Born to Break, again produced by Morley, was released worldwide on 6 April 2018.

After comprehensive line-up changes during 2019, the band ceased performing at the end of the year. The remaining members formed a new band, The Hot Damn! in 2020.

== Formation ==
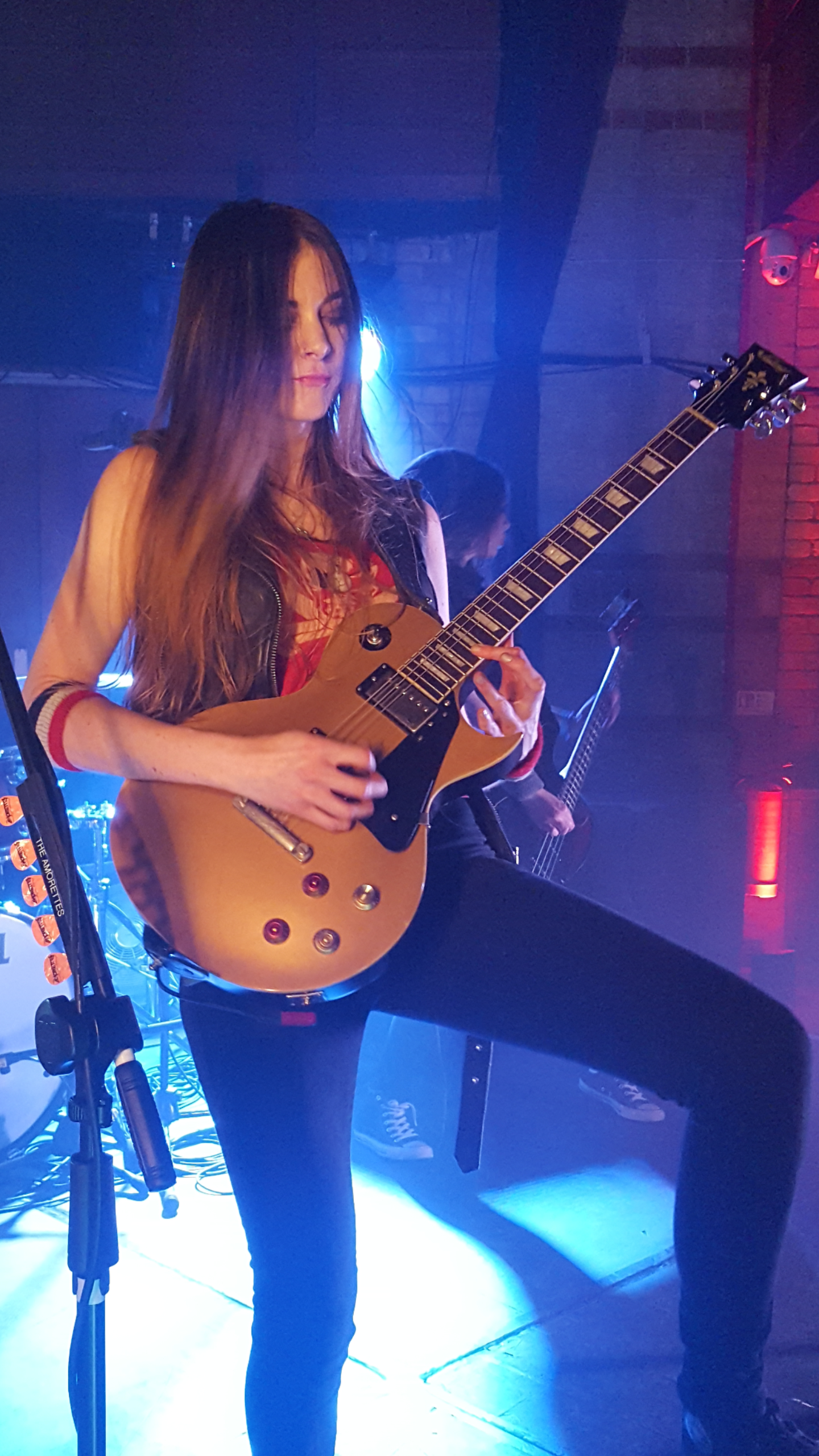
Gill Montgomery

The Amorettes were formed in March 2009 when vocalist and guitarist Gill Montgomery met drummer Hannah McKay at Stevenson College in Edinburgh. Influenced by bands such as AC/DC, Motörhead, Iron Maiden, Girlschool and Thin Lizzy, they developed a similar classic hard rock sound, described by the band as "hard, fast rock 'n' roll". The three-piece lineup was eventually completed by Hannah's younger sister Heather as bass guitarist. The band was named after Montgomery found 'Amorette' in a book of baby names.

An early break arrived in 2010 when they supported W.A.S.P. at The Garage in Glasgow at very short notice when the scheduled band was delayed.

== Haulin' Ass ==
The Amorettes' debut album Haulin' Ass was recorded in Livingston and released independently in May 2010, limited to 1000 copies. Geoff Barton of Classic Rock magazine rated it as 8/10, describing it as "Three minute stun gun bursts full of humour and hellion fury."

The band won Group of the Year at the 2011 Scottish New Music Awards, and they played Hard Rock Hell in 2011 and 2013. They continued to tour and perform regularly, playing the Hard Rock Hell festival in Ibiza in May 2014; opening for Sebastian Bach and Black Star Riders at the Steelhouse Festival in Wales in July, and playing at Bloodstock Open Air and earning sponsorship from Jägermeister in August. In October 2014, they were announced as the support act for the double-headlining tour of the UK and Ireland by Europe and Black Star Riders. Europe frontman Joey Tempest and Black Star Riders singer Ricky Warwick both welcomed the band, with Warwick stating, "We loved The Amorettes when they opened for BSR this last summer – they represent the heart and soul of The Runaways combined with The Donnas with great songs to boot... and even better, they are Scottish!!"

== Game On ==
Alongside the release of the "Fire at Will" EP which included live recordings and demos, The Amorettes recorded their second album, Game On, in 2014 with experienced producer Chris Tsangarides at his Ecology Room Studios in Kent. They signed with record label Off Yer Rocker in February 2015, and the album was released on 23 March. On 2 February, the band performed a track from the album, "Rock Me, Roll Me", live on The Fountainbridge Show on STV Edinburgh.

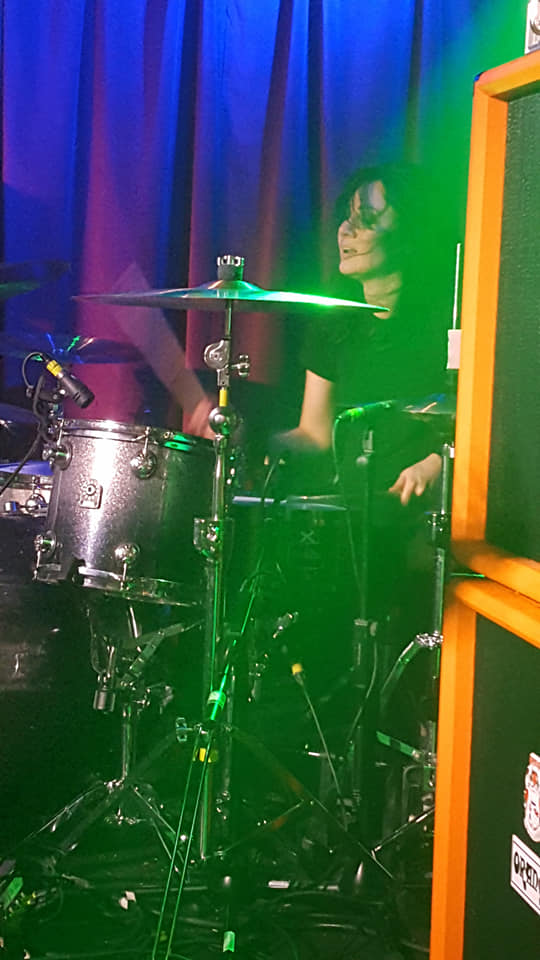
Hannah McKay

The album's release was followed by the tour with Black Star Riders and Europe in March, then shows in the Netherlands, including the Dijkrock Festival on 18 April. Returning to Scotland, the band supported Ash in Montrose on 22 May, and Black Stone Cherry at The Garage in Glasgow on 11 June. The band also performed at Sandnes in Norway on 20 June, and played at the British Steel Saturday Night Festival in Fismes, France, on 3 October.

On 5 September 2015, the band supported Gun in Troon. Later in September The Amorettes toured the UK and Ireland supporting Canadian band Danko Jones, followed by a short tour of Germany and France in November supporting Thunder, and a full UK tour supporting Ash in December.

Following promotional videos for "Fire at Will" (23 March 2015) and "Bull by the Horns" (7 May), a video for "Give 'Em Hell" was released on 28 September 2015.

On 22 January 2016, a UK tour supporting The Treatment was announced for late April and May. On 12 March, Hannah and Heather McKay won their respective categories at the 2016 Pure Rawk Awards in London.

== White Hot Heat ==
The band's third album, White Hot Heat, was recorded at Leeders Vale Studios in Ebbw Vale in April 2016, and was marketed via PledgeMusic. Produced by Luke Morley and engineered by Nick Brine, the album was released on 27 June. Morley also co-composed three of the songs on the album, with Ricky Warwick contributing to another, the first single, "Let the Neighbours Call the Cops". Morley stated, "I think we've captured something really special with the album, and I think it will surprise a lot of people."

Neil Jeffries of Classic Rock magazine gave the album 8/10, describing it as a "game changer". He cited comparisons with Getcha Rocks Off-era Def Leppard, and AC/DC during their early period with Bon Scott, and claimed the riff from the album closer "Stealing Thunder" to be "the best I've heard all year". He summed the album up as "pure hook-driven overdrive".

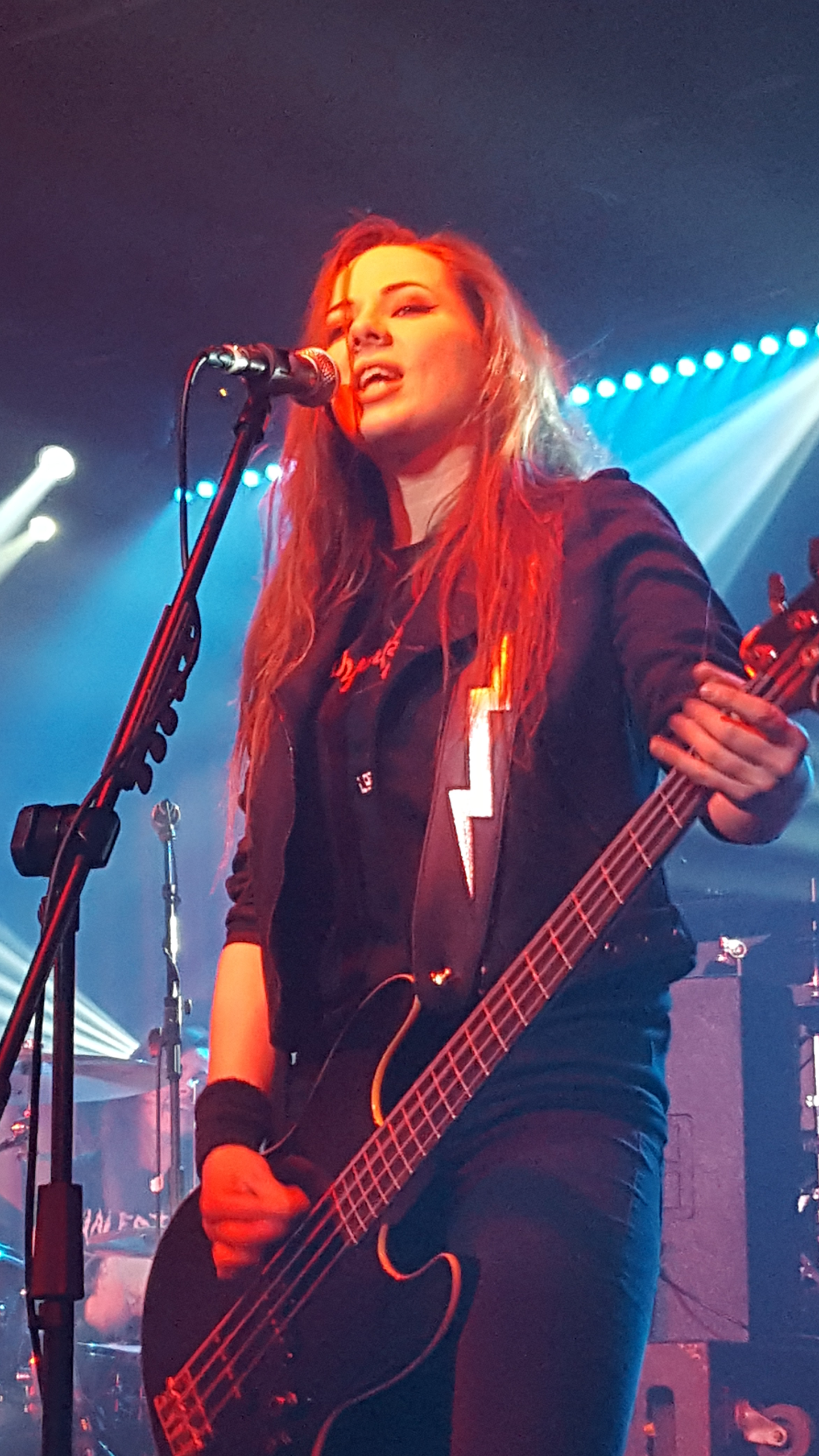
Heather McKay

On 18 April, The Amorettes were confirmed for the 2016 Download Festival on Friday 10 June. They also played at T in the Park 2016 on 8 July, Hard Rock Hell on 10 November, and Planet Rockstock in December.

On 10 June, a performance of "Let the Neighbours Call the Cops" was aired on The Friday Night Rock Show on Vintage TV, presented by Nicky Horne. Two further tracks were recorded for subsequent broadcast; "Crusader" on 24 June and "Give 'Em Hell" on 8 July. "Let the Neighbours Call the Cops" was also performed live on STV on 27 June. In late September, the band undertook a nine-date UK tour co-headlining with punk rock band Love Zombies. They also supported Airbourne at the first three UK shows of their Breakin' Outta Hell tour in November 2016 alongside Crobot.

=== 2017 and reissue of Haulin' Ass ===
The video for the second single from White Hot Heat, "White Russian Roulette", was unveiled by Planet Rock on 23 January 2017.

In March, The Amorettes again accompanied Black Star Riders on a tour of the UK and Ireland, supporting alongside Gun on the first five dates.

The band's first album, Haulin' Ass, was reissued on 16 June. Remastered by Nick Brine and repackaged with additional sleeve notes and two bonus tracks, it was limited to 2000 copies. Montgomery's original artwork was recreated by Thunder's Chris Childs, who designed the layout of the other two Amorettes albums. The reissue was accompanied by a new video for "Whoot Woo", released on 29 May 2017.

During June and July, Montgomery performed a solo acoustic tour as part of Urbanfest 2017, in association with Belushi's and Jägermeister, consisting of ten shows across the UK and Europe.

The band made several festival appearances during 2017, including Nordic Noise (Denmark) and Wildfest (Belgium) in May, and Amplified Festival and the Rock and Blues Custom Show in July. The band also supported The Dead Daisies at the Edinburgh date on their "Live and Louder" World tour. They also performed at the Rockingham Festival, held at Nottingham Trent University on 20–22 October, with the band performing on 21 October. Their first acoustic performance also took place at the festival, on the evening of 20 October.

== Born to Break and UK headline tour ==
The band's fourth album, Born to Break, was recorded during September and October 2017 at Rockfield Studios, again with Morley and Brine, and was released worldwide on 6 April 2018, ahead of a six-date UK tour supporting The Dead Daisies. On 13 December, the band announced a worldwide record deal with German label SPV GmbH/Steamhammer.

On 16 February 2018, the band released the first single from the album, "Everything I Learned I Learned from Rock and Roll", written by Montgomery and Ricky Warwick. Warwick said the song was "based on personal experience, and a nod to some of the great artists out there who have shaped and defined our rock n roll identity." The song was voted Classic Rock's track of the week for the last week of March, and was performed on Live at Five on Scottish television channel STV2 on 4 April.

On 13 April, Born to Break charted at #13 in the Official Scottish Album Charts. Describing the band as "the best band out of Scotland since The Almighty", Neil Johnson of Louder Than War cited the "more refined and considered songcraft" of Born to Break compared to its predecessor, describing it as "honest to goodness, spit and sawdust rock 'n' roll".

The second single from Born to Break, "Whatever Gets You Through the Night", was released on 13 July. The song received the band's first national radio airplay on 9 July, on Johnnie Walker's Rock Show on BBC Radio 2. A third single, "Born to Break", was released on 2 November.

The band undertook their first UK headline tour in late November, consisting of eight shows across England and Wales. This was followed by a headline slot at the Winter Rocks festival in Sheffield on 1 December alongside Skindred, Stone Broken and Wayward Sons, and then three shows supporting The Wildhearts in London, Birmingham and Glasgow. For these last four shows, Heather McKay was unable to perform and her place was taken by Morgan Pearce of Bristol-based band Flowerpot. However, the band withdrew from the last two shows after a family bereavement.

== 2019 and lineup changes ==
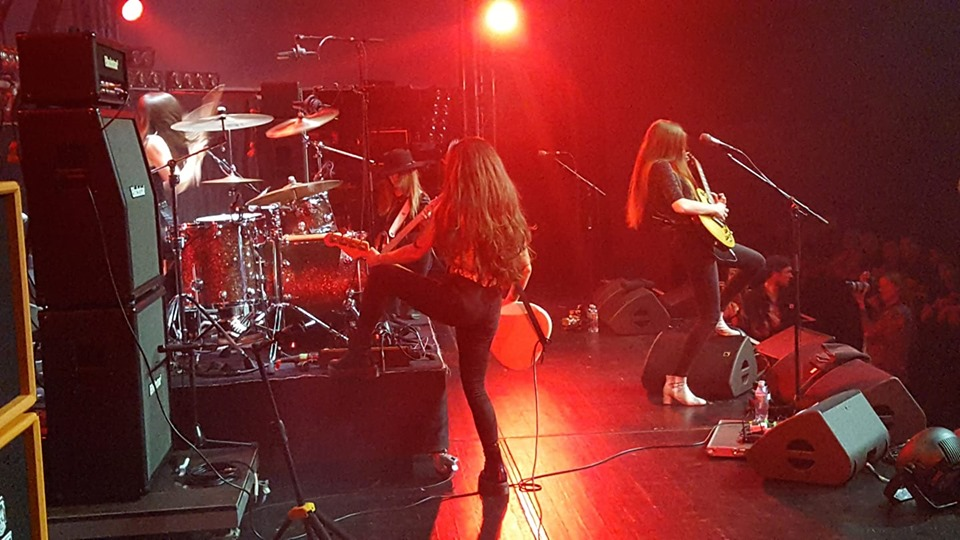
The Amorettes performing in Lucerne, Switzerland, 25 July 2019. L–R: O'Toole, Buchanan, Jaye, Montgomery

On 25 February 2019, Montgomery announced via The Amorettes' Facebook page that bassist Heather McKay and drummer Hannah McKay had amicably parted company with the band. In June, Hannah McKay joined Scottish hard rock band She Burns Red. She left in July 2020, having recorded the "Take Back Tomorrow" EP with them. In September, she and Heather McKay joined Dundee pop/new wave group Echo Machine.

On 7 March 2019, a new quartet lineup of The Amorettes was announced, as Montgomery joined forces with the rhythm section of UK-based rock trio Tequila Mockingbyrd, who had recently parted company with their guitarist/vocalist. The remaining members of both bands combined in order to fulfil all their touring commitments. Drummer Josie O'Toole and Australian bass guitarist Jacinta Jaye joined Montgomery in The Amorettes, alongside Laurie Buchanan from Aaron Buchanan & The Cult Classics as rhythm guitarist. The same four musicians were also to perform throughout 2019 at Tequila Mockingbyrd shows, with Montgomery on vocals and guitar. Buchanan played bass guitar for the first few Amorettes shows while Jaye was away in Australia.

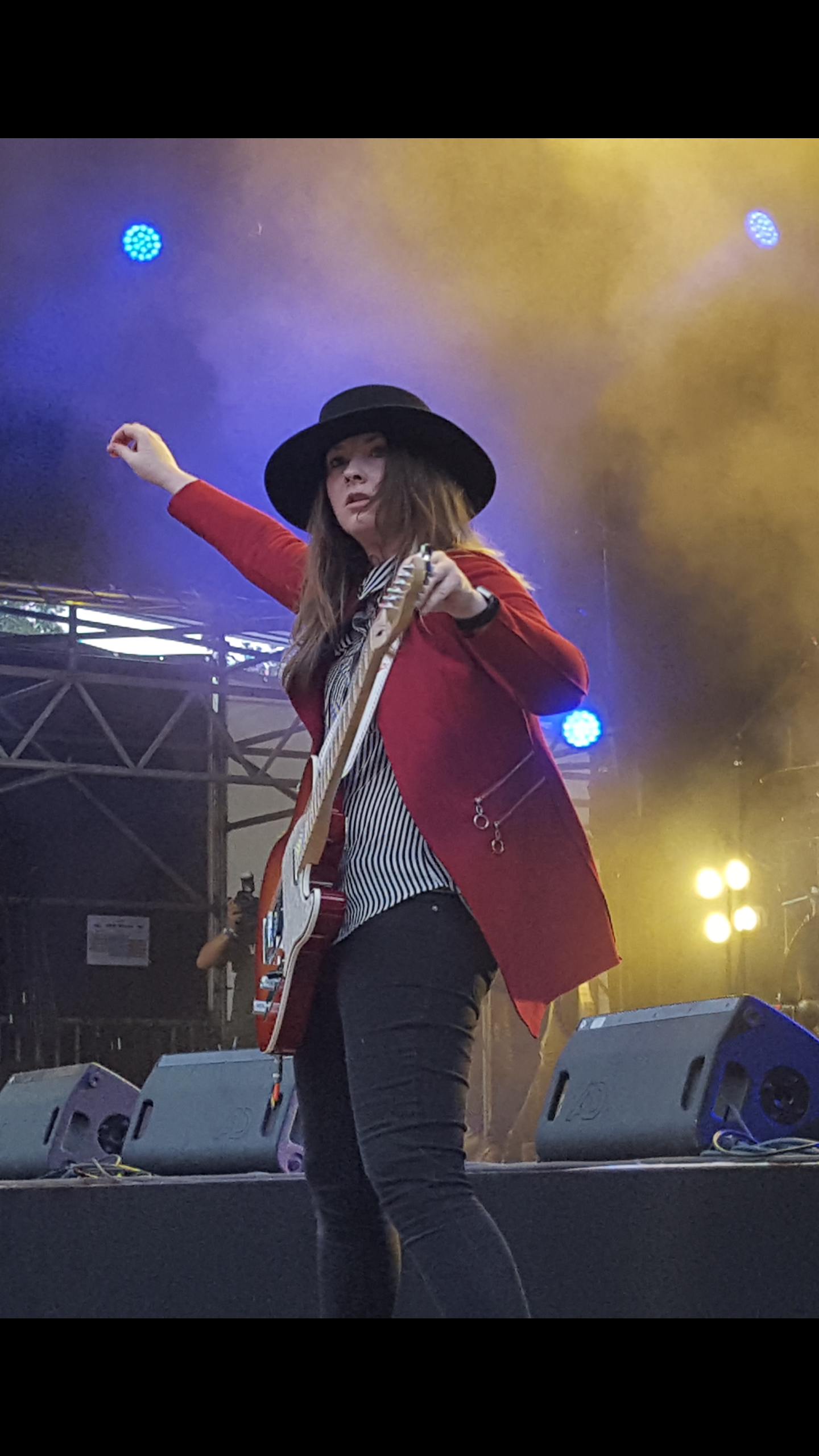
Laurie Buchanan

The first show for the new line-up of Montgomery, O'Toole and Buchanan was in the Netherlands on 20 April, as the band returned to the Dijkrock Festival. The same trio performed in support of Terrorvision at four shows across England from 2–5 May. The first Amorettes show as a quartet, with Jaye joining on bass guitar and Buchanan switching to rhythm guitar, was at the Osteguna Rock Festival in Vitoria-Gasteiz, Spain on 20 June. The band performed at the Blue Balls Festival in Lucerne, Switzerland, on 25 July supporting Airbourne, before returning to the UK for the Steelhouse Festival in Wales on 28 July to perform in support of Thin Lizzy, Living Colour and Uriah Heep among others.

Jaye left both The Amorettes and Tequila Mockingbyrd on 11 September. She was replaced on a temporary basis in both bands by Mart Trail, who was also bass guitarist for Aaron Buchanan & The Cult Classics. His first performance with both The Amorettes and Tequila Mockingbyrd came at the same event, Rocking by the River 2 in Saltash, on 5 October. The band played their final show as Tequila Mockingbyrd on 16 November, in support of Massive Wagons in Sheffield. The last Amorettes show was at the WinterStorm Festival in Troon, on 30 November, supporting Last in Line and Uli Jon Roth, among others.

The only recorded material to be released in 2019 was under the Tequila Mockingbyrd name, a single titled "Drunk When I Told Ya", featuring O'Toole, Montgomery, Buchanan and Jaye, with Jimi Hocking of The Screaming Jets on mandolin.

=== The Hot Damn! ===
The Amorettes were inactive from December 2019, and the remaining members formed a new group during 2020, during an inactive period for the music industry due to the COVID-19 pandemic. Montgomery, O'Toole and Buchanan formed The Hot Damn! along with bass guitarist Lzi Hayes (New Device, Sophie Lloyd Band), and announced the new band during November 2020.

== Personnel ==
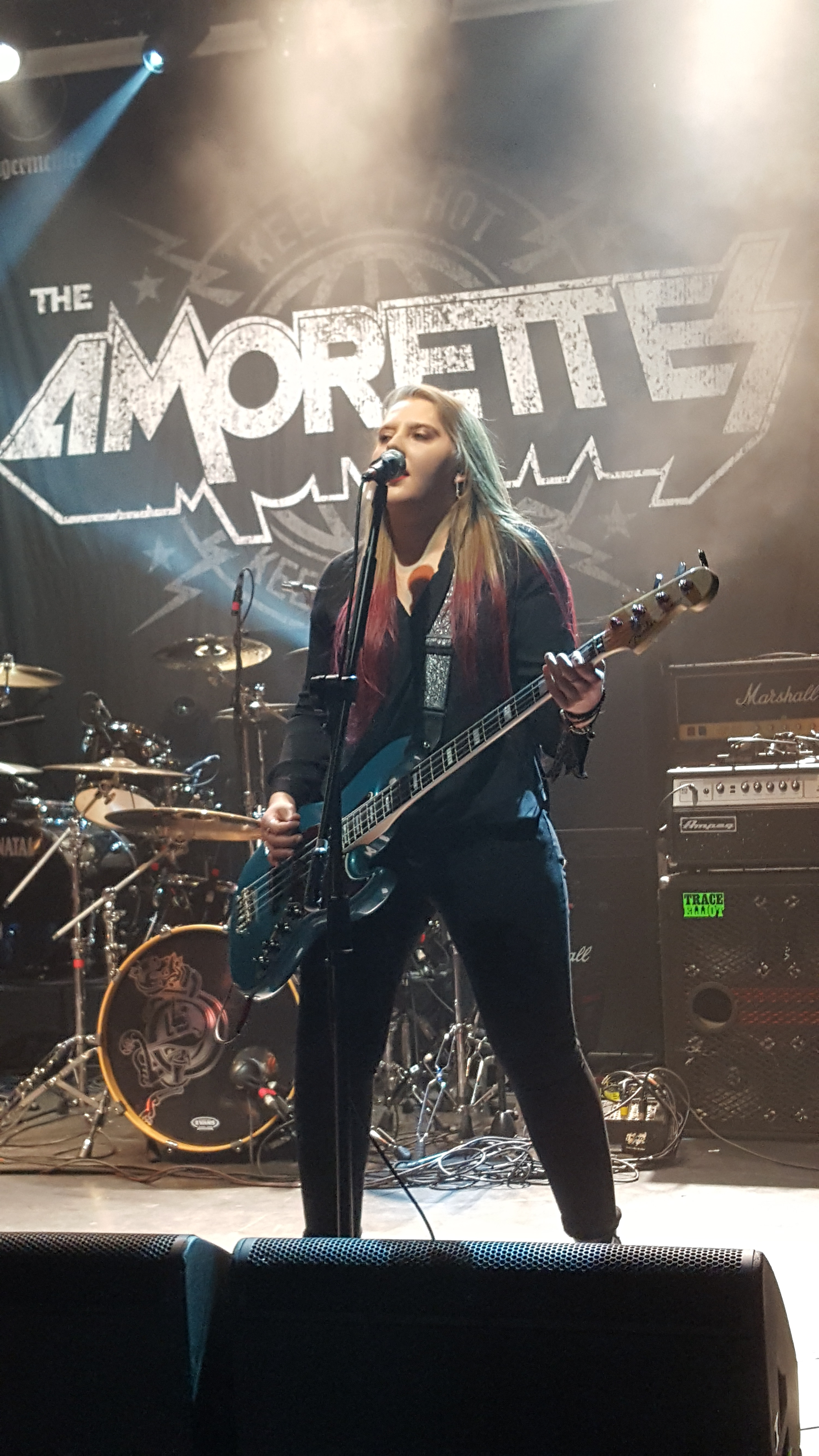
Morgan Pearce

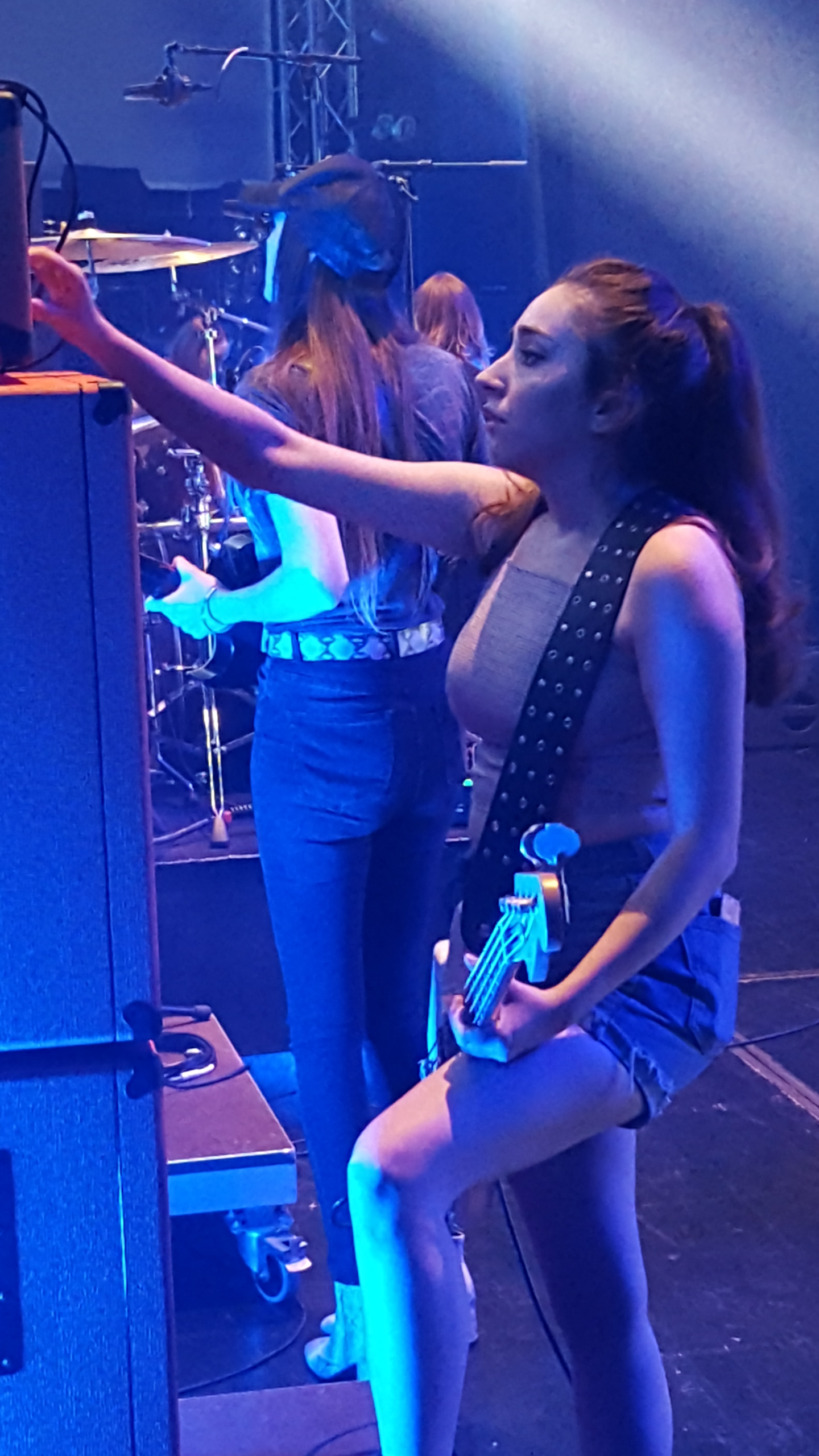
Jacinta Jaye

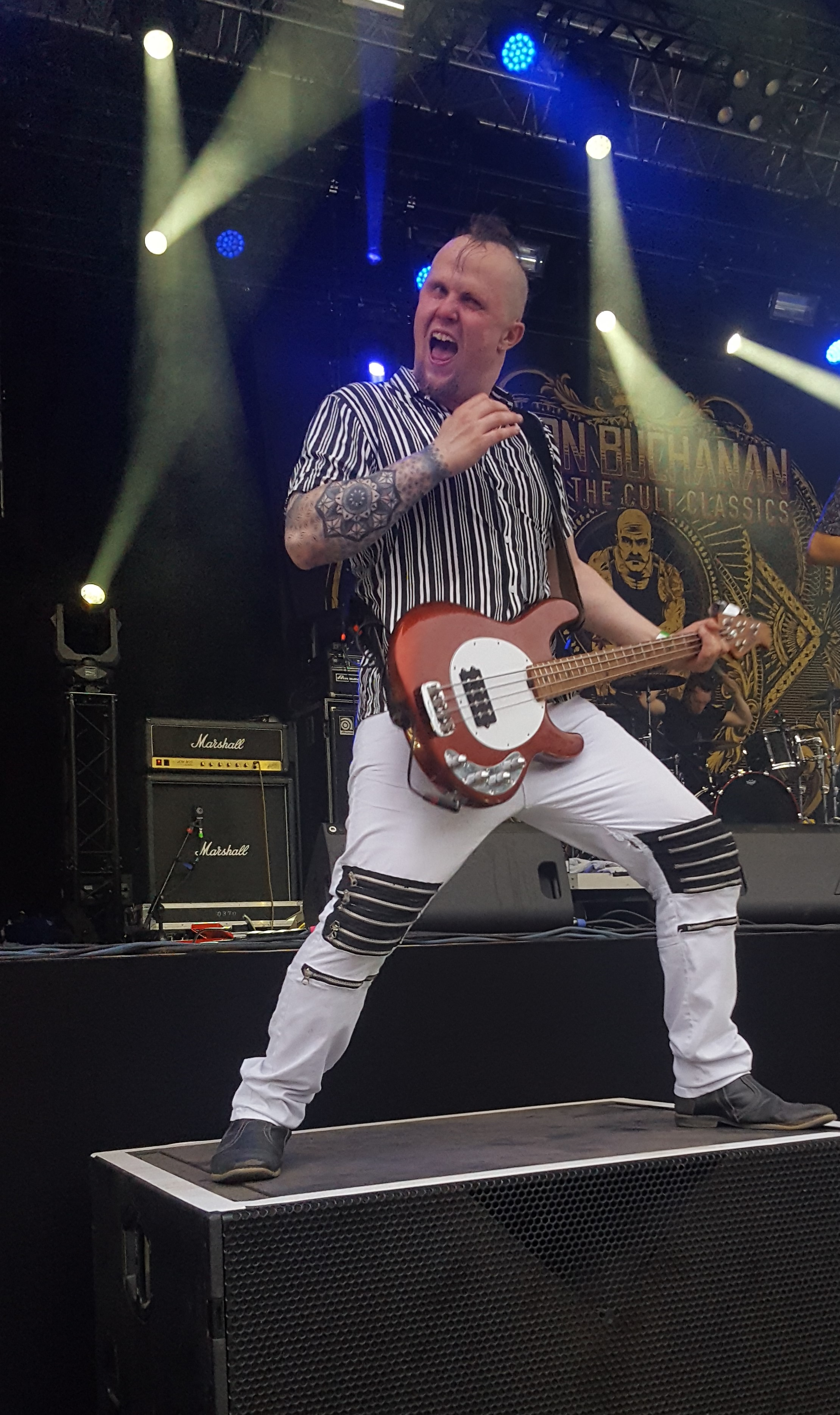
Mart Trail

- Gill Montgomery – vocals, lead guitar (2009–2019)
- Heather McKay – bass guitar, backing vocals (2009–2019)
- Hannah McKay – drums, backing vocals (2009–2019)

Touring members

- Morgan Pearce – bass guitar, backing vocals (2018)
- Laurie Buchanan – rhythm guitar, bass guitar, backing vocals (2019)
- Josie O'Toole – drums, percussion, backing vocals (2019)
- Jacinta Jaye – bass guitar, backing vocals (2019)
- Mart Trail – bass guitar, backing vocals (2019)

== Discography ==
=== Albums ===
- Haulin' Ass (2010, reissued 2017)
- Game On (2015)
- White Hot Heat (2016)
- Born to Break (2018)

=== EPs ===
- Fire at Will (2015)
- Live at Bannermans (2016)

=== Singles ===
- "Take Cover" (2014)
- "Fire at Will" (2015)
- "Bull by the Horns" (2015)
- "Give 'Em Hell" (2015)
- "Let the Neighbours Call the Cops" (2016)
- "White Russian Roulette" (2017)
- "Whoot Woo" (2017)
- "Everything I Learned I Learned from Rock and Roll" (2018)
- "Whatever Gets You Through the Night" (2018)
- "Born to Break" (2018)
