= The Mirror Trap =

Scottish indie rock band

- Origin: Dundee, Scotland, United Kingdom
- Genre: Indie rock
- Years active: 2009–2018, since 2024
- Members: Gary "The Panther" Moore; Michael "John" McFarlane (currently not an active member); Paul Markie; Paul Reilley; Ben Doherty

The Mirror Trap are an alternative indie rock band from Dundee, Scotland. The band consists of Gary 'The Panther' Moore on vocals, Paul Markie on guitars, Paul 'Drums' Reilly on drums and Ben Doherty on bass. They were sometimes joined by Scott Duffy on additional percussion and vocals. Matthew Demsey (guitar) also joined the band for some shows in 2026. Michael 'John' McFarlane is currently not an active member of the band, but he might be back "in the not too distant future".

The band's releases include 2014's Stay Young and 2016's Simulations. They supported fellow Dundee band The View and toured Russia with Placebo in the summer of 2014 and spring 2015. They supported Placebo during some of the concerts on their 20 years of Placebo tour and supported the band again in 2026 on their 30th anniversary tour, playing a total of 4 shows in Hamburg, Amsterdam, Frankfurt and Antwerp.

In 2018 The Mirror Trap originally disbanded with some members going on to form Echo Machine.

Their reunion started 6 years later in 2024 when they came together and took the stage once again at the Beat Generator Live! in Dundee on December 21 (support acts Rush Hour Soul and Captains). Followed by new music being released in 2026.

== History ==
The band formed while studying music at Dundee College in 2009 and quickly made a name for themselves in support slots with The View. They recorded their first album The Last Great Melodrama in 2011 and the EP The Visible Hand followed in 2012. During this period they recorded a live session for the BBC with Vic Galloway. They also played the T Break Stage at T in the Park 2012. Former Dundee FC footballer and promoter Lee Wilkie spotted the band's talent and introduced them to Dave McLean of Riverman Management. The two began to co-manage the band through Riverman Management who also represent Placebo. Wilkie and Mclean brought the Mirror Trap to the attention of Placebo and the band supported them at the HMV Picture House, Edinburgh on 25 April 2012. In 2013 Brian Molko attended one of their small gigs at Non-Zero's on Dundee's Castle Street. Placebo were impressed with the band's performance and invited them to join them as support at a charity performance in Leeds on 8 November 2013. By the time the band recorded and released their second album, Stay Young they were offered the chance to support Placebo on a tour of Russia in the summer of 2014. The tour covered 8 venues in 13 days and the band invited Scott Duffy to join them, providing additional percussion and vocals. The tour included a performance for 3000 fans at Krasnodar's Ice Palace. The band became an overnight success in Russia, provoking an outpouring of excitement and fan art on social media. In September 2014 Placebo announced that The Mirror Trap would be joining them at the 2014 iTunes Festival, performing at London's Roundhouse in Camden Town. The release of their 2016 album Simulations saw the band take up slots at the Summer Sonic Festival in Japan and the Y Not Festival in England.

== The Last Great Melodrama (2011) ==
The Last Great Melodrama was released on 21 November 2011. Singles taken from the 11-track album included 'My Alabama' for which the band released an accompanying video on 14 October 2011.

== The Visible Hand (2012) ==
The Visible Hand was launched at the Doghouse, Dundee on 9 November 2012. To launch the record The Mirror Trap made plaster casts of hands with the index fingers painted black and distributed them around Dundee. The four-track EP was recorded at Gardyne Studios, Dundee and included 'Future Lionheart' which would also appear on Stay Young.

== Stay Young (2014) ==
Stay Young was released on 24 February 2014. The album was received warmly with reviewers noting the band's passion, charm and resistance to the status quo. Artwork for the album was designed by Max Gabbot and Charlie Parsons, graduates of Dundee's Duncan of Jordanstone College of Art and Design. The band made videos for several of the singles from the album including 'Killing Time', 'Westminster Ghost Story' and 'Bell Street'.

== Silent Men (2015) ==
Silent Men is an EP released on 16 February 2015 featuring artwork from Dundee artist and Michael McFarlane's sister, Louise McFarlane, also known as 'louloureeed'. The band made a video for its title track, 'Silent Men'.

== Simulations (2016) ==
Simulations was recorded at Thailand's Karma Sound Studios, which saw the band follow in the footsteps of Enter Shikari, Bullet For My Valentine, The Libertines, and Placebo. Videos made for songs featured on Simulations included 'New Trance' which featured scenes from the band's hometown of Dundee and 'Pirhanas', which was directed by Stuart Breadner and noted upon release for its violent imagery. The record was released in May 2016 on Vinyl Junkie Recordings in Japan and Warner Music Group in Russia. Its release date in the UK is 8 July 2016.

== All That Remains is a Ghost (2026) ==
With this EP The Mirror Trap released their first music in 10 years. It is also the first music the band released since their reunion following the breakup in 2018. The music was written, produced and recorded in "their rooftop hideout in Dundee". Singles from the record include Everlasting Life (released 22.06.2026), A Painting of a Building on Fire (released 15.07.2026) and Cdr (released 07.08.2026). The EP itself was released on August 14 2026. Videos made for songs featured on the record include Cdr and A Painting of a Building on Fire.
