= T in the Park 2012 =

Music festival in Scotland

T in the Park
- Dates: 6–8 July 2012
- Locations: Balado, Scotland
- Years active: 1994 - present
- Website: http://tinthepark.com/

T in the Park 2012 was a three-day music festival which took place from 6–8 July 2012 in Balado, Kinross. The Stone Roses were announced as the first headline act on 8 November 2011, appearing on Saturday 7 July 2012. Snow Patrol and Kasabian were later confirmed to also be headlining on Friday 6 July and Sunday 8 July respectively. This year marks the first time all three days of the festival will have an equal capacity, after councillors granted a request to raise Friday's capacity by 10,000. This approval brings Friday in line with the festivals 85,000 capacity previously restricted to Saturday and Sunday.

== Tickets ==
Similar to previous years, early-bird tickets were released within days of the conclusion of the 2011 event, on 12 July 2011. Tickets remained on sale until the following Sunday. The second release of tickets went on sale at 9 am on 2 December 2011, selling out within hours of release. The final release of tickets went on sale on 29 February 2012 at 9 am. Tickets eventually sold out during the final days before the festival.

The Stone Roses were announced as the first headline act on 8 November, three weeks before the second release tickets went on sale. On 30 November, Vodafone customers who were signed up to the "Vodafone VIP" site were granted access to a pre-sale. The next day, T-Lady subscribers and past festival goers were also given access to the pre-sale. The second release tickets, equivalent to half of the venues capacity, went on sale to the general public on 2 December at 9 am, hours later allocation was exhausted. Festival director, Geoff Ellis said that he was "delighted by the response from fans" and also noted that he "can’t wait to see everyone at Balado next year."

Later he said: "The response to The Stone Roses announcement has been fantastic and the rest of the bill is shaping up nicely - we can’t wait until February to share it with the best audience in the world." On 10 December 2011, Geoff Ellis stated that "There will probably be an announcement on the headliners early in the new year." In an interview by Express.co.uk, he confirmed that there would be an announcement coming soon as they had just managed to increase the festival's first day capacity by 10,000 - which brings Friday inline with the capacity allowed on Saturday and Sunday, he noted this would increase the festivals opportunity to draw a bigger headliner for the Friday night. Early in 2012, it was announced the third and final ticket release would go on sale on 29 February 2012. On 21 February 2012, one week before the final release of tickets, 9 acts were revealed via the T in the Park official Twitter account. The acts announced were: Noel Gallagher's High Flying Birds, Florence + The Machine, The Maccabees, The Horrors, Simple Minds, Miles Kane, The Vaccines, Maverick Sabre, Frank Turner and Two Door Cinema Club. Another announcement on 23 February revealed the remaining two headlining acts, Snow Patrol and Kasabian. Other acts revealed at the same time included Jessie J, David Guetta, The Enemy, Kaiser Chiefs, Amy Macdonald Nicki Minaj, The Darkness, Calvin Harris, Skrillex and Elbow.

== Line-up ==
The Stone Roses were announced as the first headline act on 8 November 2011. On 21 February 2012, one week before the final release of tickets, 9 acts were revealed via the T in the Park official Twitter account. The acts announced were: Noel Gallagher's High Flying Birds, Florence + The Machine, The Maccabees, The Horrors, Miles Kane, The Vaccines, Maverick Sabre, Frank Turner and Two Door Cinema Club. Another announcement on 23 February revealed the remaining two headlining acts, Snow Patrol and Kasabian. Other acts revealed at the same time included Jessie J, David Guetta, Kaiser Chiefs, The Darkness, Calvin Harris, Skrillex and Elbow. Swedish house Mafia were also added to the line-up, making it their last appearance in Scotland before they split up. As usual, T in the Park continue to reveal more acts as the event nears. On 23 April the lineup poster was updated, some new additions included Hilltop Hoods and Fun., however Mastodon disappeared from the lineup, leading to speculation they have cancelled their appearance (this speculation was officially confirmed on 24 April). On 27 April, Keane were added to the lineup. On 1 May, Sub Focus was added to the Saturday lineup. As of 1 May 2012 a total of 110 acts have been announced, in contrast 171 acts completed the T in the Park 2011 lineup.

Main Stage
Friday 6 July	Saturday 7 July	Sunday 8 July
Snow Patrol; 22:20-23:50; Florence and the Machine; 20:35-21:50; Example; 19:05-20:05; Kaiser Chiefs; 17:45-18:35; The Darkness; 16:30-17:15	The Stone Roses; 22:20-23:50; Noel Gallagher's High Flying Birds; 20:30-21:40; Jessie J 19:10-20:00; The Vaccines; 17:50-18:40; Simple Minds; 16:35-17:20; Emeli Sandé; 15:25-16:05; The Wailers; 14:20-14:55; Shed Seven; 13:15-13:50; The View; 12:20-12:50	Kasabian; 21:20-22:50; Elbow; 19:30-20:45; Chase and Status; 18:00-19:00; Keane; 16:40-17:30; Bombay Bicycle Club; 15:25-16:10; James Morrison; 14:15-14:55; Twin Atlantic; 13:10-13:45; McFly; 12:10-12:40; Nicola Benedetti; 11:55-12:10

Radio 1/NME Stage
Friday	Saturday	Sunday
Tinie Tempah; 22:35-23:50; Professor Green; 21:15-22:05; Olly Murs; 20:00-20:45; The Temper Trap; 18:30-19:30; Feeder (CANCELLED); 17:30-18:15; Hilltop Hoods; 16:30-17:00	David Guetta; 22:15-23:50; Two Door Cinema Club; 20:45-21:45; The Courteeners; 19:25-20:15; Enter Shikari; 18:05-18:55; Rizzle Kicks; 16:50-17:35; Dappy; 15:40-16:20; Devlin; 14:30-15:10; Stooshe; 13:30-14:00; Cover Drive; 12:30-13:00	Swedish House Mafia; 20:50-22:50; Nicki Minaj; 19:15-20:20; Happy Mondays; 17:45-18:45; Frank Turner and The Sleeping Souls; 16:30-17:15; Maverick Sabre; 15:20-16:00; Rita Ora; 14:25-14:50; The Subways; 13:20-13:55; The Brilliant Things; 12:20-12:50

King Tut's Wah Wah Tent
Friday	Saturday	Sunday
New Order; 22:20-23:50; The Cribs; 21:00-21:50; Miike Snow; 19:40-20:30; Labrinth; 18:25-19:10; Cher Lloyd; 17:25-17:55; Dot Rotten; 16:30-17:00	Calvin Harris; 22:20-23:50; Amy MacDonald; 20:50-21:50; The Maccabees; 19:20-20:20; Ben Howard; 18:00-18:50; J. Cole; 16:45-17:30; Alabama Shakes; 15:35-16:15; Childish Gambino; 14:40-15:10; Flux Pavilion; 13:45-14:15; Blood Red Shoes; 12:50-13:20 alt-J; 12:00-12:25	Skrillex; 21:25-22:25; Nero; 19:40-20:55; The Enemy; 18:15-19:10; Miles Kane; 17:00-17:45; The Wanted; 15:50-16:30; Christina Perri; 14:45-15:20; Fun; 13:45-14:15; The Coronas; 12:50-13:20; The Original Rudeboys; 12:00-12:25

Slam Tent
Friday	Saturday	Sunday
Sven Väth; 21:00-00:00; Slam; 16:30-21:00	Skream feat SGT Pokes; 22:45-00:00; Benga (Live); 21:45-22:45; Erol Alkan; 20:30-21:45; Major Lazer (live); 19:30-20:30; Fake Blood; 18:15-19:30; Jack Beats; 17:15-18:15; Crookers; 16:00-17:15; DJ Yoda; 14:45-16:00; Clouds; 13:30-14:45; Teengirl Fantasy; 13:00-13:30; Ben Martin (High Sheen); 12:00-13:00	Orbital (Live); 21:45-23:00; Len Faki; 20:30-21:45; Joris Voorn; 19:15-20:30; Dubfire; 18:00-19:15; Simian Mobile Disco; 17:00-18:00; Maya Jane Coles; 15:45-17:00; Pan-Pot; 14:30-15:45; Paul Kalkbrenner; 13:30-14:30; Gary Beck; 12:45-13:30; Hans Bouffmyhre; 12:00-12:45

Transmission Stage
Friday	Saturday	Sunday
The Blackout; 22:40-23:50; The Brian Jonestown Massacre; 21:20-21:10; Pulled Apart by Horses; 20:05-20:50; Tribes; 18:45-19:35; The Jezabels; 17:45-18:15; The Parlotones; 16:45-17:15	Sub Focus; 22:00-22:30; Boom Monk Ben; 21:10-21:40; We Were Promised Jetpacks; 20:20-20:50; We Are Augustines; 18:45-19:25; Benjamin Francis Leftwich; 17:40-18:15; Ren Harvieu; 16:35-17:10; Django Django; 15:35-16:05; Jake Bugg; 14:35-15:05; Here We Go Magic; 13:45-14:10; Dawes; 12:55-13:20; Lonsdale Boys Club; 12:05-12:30	The Horrors; 21:40-22:50; Reverend and the Makers; 20:20-21:10; Band of Skulls; 19:00-19:50; Bellowhead; 17:45-18:30; Little Roy; 16:45-17:15; Spector; 15:45-16:15; Josh Osho; 14:45-15:15; Howler; 13:45-14:15; Milk; 12:50-13:20; Zulu Winter; 12:00-12:25

T Break Stage
Friday	Saturday	Sunday
Crusades; 23:00-23:50; Nevada Base; 22:10-22:40; Bwani Junction; 21:20-21:50; Organs Of Love; 20:30-21:00; King Charles; 19:40-20:10; The Mirror Trap; 18:50-19:20; Davey Horne; 18:00-18:30; Hares; 17:10-17:40	Roman Nose; 22:00-22:30; Black Canvas <vr> 21:10-21:40; The Machine Room; 20:20-20:50; Mull Historical Society; 19:15-20:00; Sunday Herald Band; 18:40-18:55; The Minutes; 17:50-18:20; Carly Connor; 17:00-17:30; Broken Hands; 16:10-16:40; Vukovi; 15:20-15:50; Nikki Garnett; 14:30-15:00; Bacchanal Party; 13:40-14:10; Brown Bear & The Bandits; 12:50-13:20; Randolph's Leap; 12:00-12:30	Teklo; 22:00-22:30; Capitals; 21:10-21:40; ANDERSON McGrinty WEBSTER Ward and FISHER; 20:20-20:50; The Birthday Suit; 19:30-20:00; Dry The River; 18:40-19:10; Dog Is Dead; 17:50-18:20; The IMagineers; 17:00-17:30; The Beautiful Word; 16:10-16:40; Lawson; 15:20-15:50; The Chevin; 14:30-15:00; Chris Devotion and The Expectations; 13:40-14:10; Open Swimmer; 12:50-13:20; Beer Jacket; 12:00-12:30

BBC Introducing Stage
Friday	Saturday	Sunday
	Nina Nesbitt; 20:00-20:25; Hector Bizerk; 19:15-19:40; We Could Be Astronauts; 18:30-18:55; Damgroove; 17:45-18:10; Fatherson; 17:00-17:25; United Fruit; 16:15-16:40; Spring Offensive; 15:30-15:55; Elro; 14:45-15:10; La Shark; 14:00-14:25; Courts; 13:15-13:45; Woodenbox; 12:30-12:55	Admiral Fallow; 19:15-19:40; Oxygen Thief; 18:30-18:55; Miaoux Miaoux; 17:45-18:10; Vigo Thieves; 17:00-17:25; More Than Conquerors; 16:15-16:40; Changing Horses; 15:30-15:55; Laki Mera; 14:45-15:10; Weird Shapes; 14:00-14:25; Chutes; 13:15-13:40; Swami Baracus; 12:30-12:55

Cancelled acts were

- Mastodon
- Pete Doherty
- Feeder

== Incidents ==
In April two men were arrested for selling counterfeit "VIP wristbands" for T in the Park, after police were alerted the bands, were being sold through social networking sites for over £200. Det Insp David Perrit said: "This fraud will undoubtedly be a real shock for music fans who thought they were buying a genuine wristband for this year's festival. We believe there may be more people who have been scammed by these two men, so I am asking anyone who has bought one of these bands to please contact police. These bands do not look anything like the genuine article so, if you have bought one or been given one, please do not go to Balado or try to get access to the festival, as site security are aware of these bands and you will not get into any part of the site. Please do not even risk it."

The number of arrests were 30 with 271 incidents also being reported, mostly for drug-related offences. Superintendent Rick Dunkerley acknowledged a small increase in the number of reported crimes but said: "It has been another outstanding weekend and, while crimes are up on last year, this is due to the proactive work of our police officers and the stewards working alongside them."

12 people were taken to Perth Sheriff Court, who were handed out over £4,000 in fines to revellers caught with drugs In October it was released over £25,000 worth of drugs were recovered by Tayside police during the festival

== See also ==
- List of music festivals in the United Kingdom
