= JB's Dudley =

Nightclub and music venue in Dudley, West Midlands, England

JB's Dudley club
- Interactive map of JB's Dudley club
- Address: 15 Castle Hill, Dudley, DY1 4QF
- Location: West Midlands, England
- Coordinates: 52°30′49″N 2°4′32″W
- Type: Nightclub
- Event: Rock

Construction
- Opened: 1969
- Closed: 2011

Website
- http://www.jbsdudley.co.uk/

JB's Dudley, usually known simply as JB's, was a nightclub and live music venue located on Castle Hill near the centre of Dudley, West Midlands. Originally opened on a different site in 1969, it claimed to be the longest-running live music venue in the United Kingdom, and hosted early performances by acts such as Dire Straits and U2.

== History ==
The club was owned throughout its existence by former motorcycle speedway rider Sam Jukes, who started the club with two friends in 1969 after his sporting career was ended by injury. It began operation as a disco night held in the social club at the former home stadium of Dudley Town Football Club and was intended to raise extra funds for the cash-strapped club. It quickly outgrew these premises and relocated to a 250-capacity venue behind a menswear shop on King Street in the early 1970s, before moving to Castle Hill in 1994, which afforded a capacity of 1,000. Jukes states that he named the club after John Bryant, a local DJ who was popular with women, as he felt his association with the venue would help bring in customers, although rumours persist that it was named after Led Zeppelin drummer John Bonham, a native of nearby Redditch.

In 2008, rumours circulated that the venue might be subject to a compulsory purchase order and closed down as part of a multimillion-pound redevelopment scheme for the town centre. A spokesman for Dudley Metropolitan Borough Council stated, however, that this was not part of the plan at that time, although the redevelopment might extend to include Castle Hill at a future date.

The club went into administration during 2010, and it was hoped that a buyer would be found to continue to run the club in its then-present state but new ownership failed to materialise and the club was closed in January 2011. The site of the club was eventually sold in late 2012 and was briefly transformed into a conference and banqueting centre.

== Concerts ==
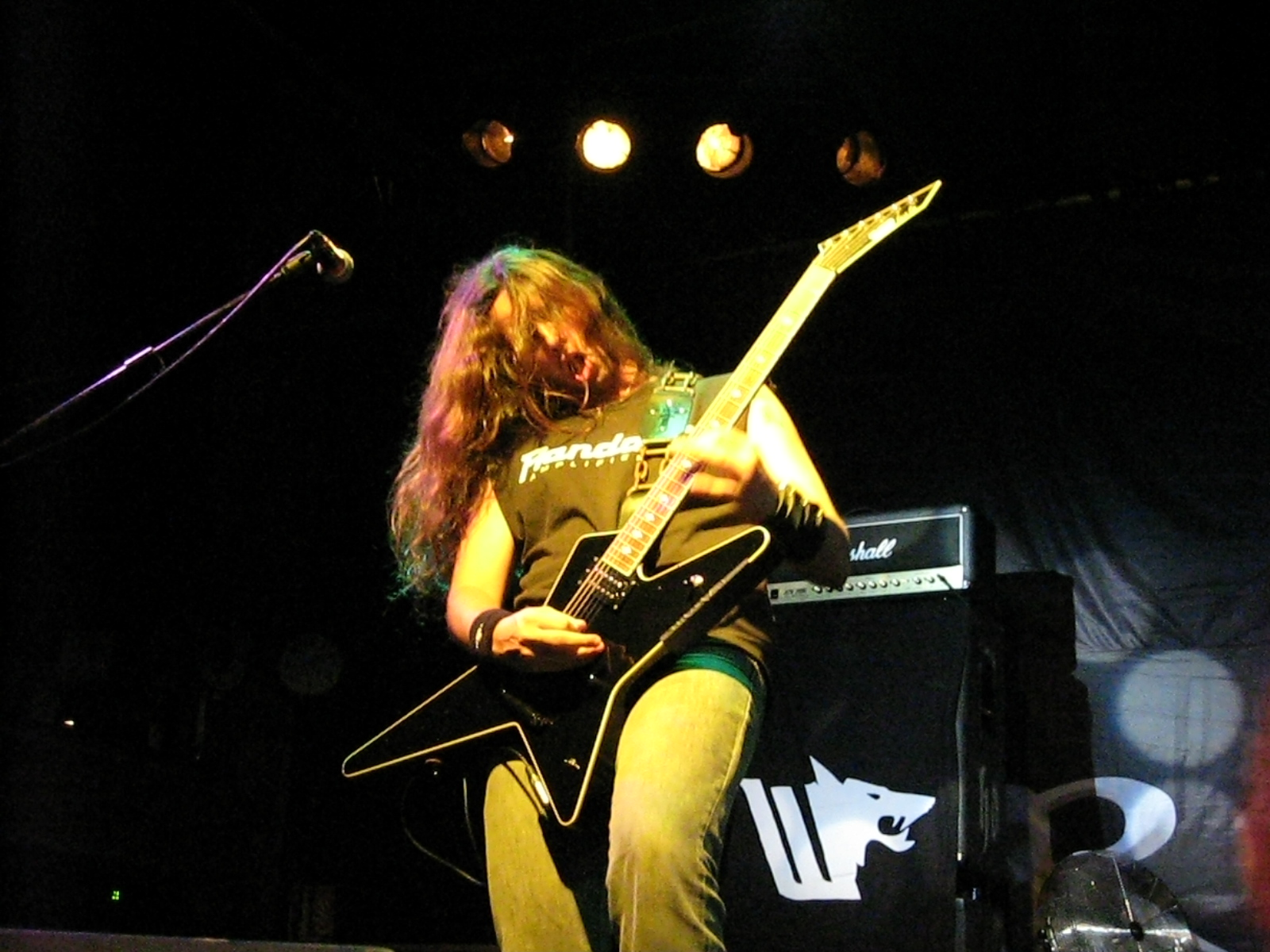
Gus G. of Firewind playing at JB's in 2007

The venue hosted performances by U2, UB40, Blur, Manic Street Preachers, Elvis Costello, Skunk Anansie, The Stone Roses, Primal Scream, Doctor Feelgood, Radiohead and Judas Priest. It also regularly hosted concerts by up-and-coming local bands, including People Eater. The three leading bands of the so-called "Stourbridge music scene" of the early 1990s, Pop Will Eat Itself, The Wonder Stuff and Ned's Atomic Dustbin, all cite the venue as a major influence over their early careers. In 2000, the venue celebrated its 30th anniversary by hosting a two-day music festival at nearby Dudley Castle featuring Terrorvision, Ned's Atomic Dustbin, and former Wonder Stuff frontman Miles Hunt.

Frank Sidebottom maintained that his set at JB's, a poorly-attended gig at which the audience collectively decided to play football instead of watching the band, was the best gig he ever did.
