= T in the Park 2016 =

Music festival in Scotland

T in the Park
- Dates: 8–11 July 2016
- Locations: Strathallan Castle, Perthshire
- Website: http://tinthepark.com/

T in the Park 2016 was a three-day music festival organised by DF Concerts, which took place between 8–11 July 2016 and for the second time was held at Strathallan Castle, which is 20 miles away from the festival's previous location at the disused Balado airfield, Kinross-shire. Strathallan Castle camp site opened from 7 to 12 July, while the overall number of attendances was lower than 2015 after DF Concerts reduced the number of daily tickets by 15,000.

== Strathallan Castle location ==
In 2014, plans were drawn up to allow the festival to be relocated to Strathallan Castle. This was due to a section of the festival grounds at Balado being situated over the Forties pipeline causing the Health and Safety Executive (HSE) to request for the festival to be relocated away from its previous site at Balado. According to HSE, an accident could result in a large number of casualties and people receiving a dangerous dose of thermal radiation. The 2015 event resulted in the traffic chaos, with claims of up to five hour delays, which were partly blamed on the wet conditions which resulted in tractors hauling hundreds of vehicles onto the exit road.

In January 2016, T in the Park announced it had restructured the festival’s operational team as part of dealing with problems which arise from 2015 event. Former T in the Park Police Event Commander, Colin Brown, become the Security Manager, and former Road Police Inspector Ian Martin took over control of Traffic Manager, while APL Events were appointed to look after site management. Colin Rodger, Event Manager of T in the Park, said: “We’ve had a full de-brief on the 2015 festival with all relevant agencies including Police Scotland, Traffic Scotland and Perth and Kinross Council as well as festival goers and local residents. We have listened to every single comment and we thank everyone for their valuable input. We’re now focused on delivering the 2016 festival and we know where we need to improve. By restructuring the management of key areas, such as the site and security, we will solve issues from last year’s event.

In March, T in the Park bosses were ordered to provide further details on their plans for the music festival by Perth and Kinross Council which triggered a second public consultation period looking at traffic management and how wildlife such as red squirrels, ospreys, bats and otters would be protected during the festival.

In April 2016, DF Concerts announced new traffic plans with new separate road access for buses and cars, along with a “well managed” pick-up and drop-off area, while a new bus depot and station with more than 40 stances with one way bus lane has been built. Perth and Kinross council received eight letters of objection. However, Ian Martin, traffic manager at T in the Park and a former road police inspector, described the changes to the transport set up as “significant.”

“We’ve not tweaked last year’s, we started with a blank piece of paper and after months of testing and liaising with our partner agencies, including Transport Scotland, Perth and Kinross Council and Police Scotland as well as local community councils, we have a solid plan in place,” he said.

And Inspector David Hynd, head of road policing with Police Scotland, added: “The organisers have taken on board the issues from last year and, in conjunction with its partner agencies, produced a new on-site transport set up which should bring benefits to not only those people attending the event but also to those in the local community who are directly affected by it.”

On 30 April, T in the Park was finally granted a public entertainment licence, after five hours of discussions with Perth and Kinross council. the Licensing committee refused the request for a three-year licence, instead granting permission for only that summer’s event. DF Concerts reduced the number of daily attendances from 85,000 to 70,000.

== Line-up ==
=== Main Stage ===
Friday 8 July	Saturday 9 July	Sunday 10 July
The Stone Roses; Disclosure; Courteeners; James Morrison; Fun Lovin' Criminals; Alessia Cara; The Temperance Movement	Calvin Harris; Bastille; The Last Shadow Puppets; Jess Glynne; Tinie Tempah; Jack Garratt; Royce 5'9"	Red Hot Chili Peppers; Chase & Status; Faithless; James Bay; Slaves; The Lightning Seeds; Rogue Orchestra - David Bowie Tribute

=== Radio One Summer Of Dance Stage/Radio 1 Stage ===
Friday 8 July	Saturday 9 July	Sunday 10 July
Alesso; Pete Tong; Oliver Heldens; Danny Howard; Hannah Wants; Annie Mac; Krept & Konan; Oh Wonder; WSTRN	The 1975; Catfish and the Bottlemen; Kaiser Chiefs; Disciples; Rat Boy; DMA's; Spring King	LCD Soundsystem; Major Lazer; Jake Bugg; Maxïmo Park; Nathaniel Rateliff & The Nigh Sweats; Blossoms; Sunset Sons

=== King Tut's Wah Wah Tent ===
Friday 8 July	Saturday 9 July	Sunday 10 July
Jamie XX; Frightened Rabbit; Rodrigo y Gabriela; Bear's Den; The Coral; Augustines; Gerry Cinnamon	Travis; Tom Odell; Bay City Rollers; Stiff Little Fingers; Shed Seven; Fatherson; Foy Vance	Diplo; Craig David's TS5; Frank Turner & The Sleeping Souls; John Grant; FIDLAR; Dua Lipa

=== Slam Tent ===
Friday 8 July	Saturday 9 July	Sunday 10 July
Len Faki; DVS1; Ricardo Villalobos bsb Raresh; Petrichor (live); Silicone Soul	Richie Hawtin; Slam (DJs): Stuart Mcmillan & Orde Meikle; Nina Kraviz; Guy Gerber; Skream; Daniel Avery; B.Traits	Jeff Mills; Chris Leibing; Seth Troxler; Pan-Pot; Speedy J; Marcel Dettmannn; Scuba

=== T Break Stage ===
Friday 8 July	Saturday 9 July	Sunday 10 July
The Amorettes; Ash; JP Cooper; Izzy Bizu; The Telermen; Bloodlines; Scope; The Ninth Wave; Forever; Break The Butterfly	Maxi Jazz & E-Type Boys; The Struts; Basement; Vant; JR Green; Frances; Miracle Glass Company; The Vegan Leather; Scholesy; Mt. Doubt; Redolent; Domiciles	The Lapelles; The Sherlocks; Hey Hello; BORNS; Sweaty Palms; Declan Welsh; Foreign Fox; Indigo Velvet; Edwin Organ; Tongues

== Incidents ==
In the early hours 8 July 2016, Police Scotland were investigating the deaths of a 17-year-old male from the west of Scotland and a female of the same age from the north of England. It was not believed the deaths were linked but may have been related to drugs.

An ATM containing a significant amount of cash was stolen from the campsite. A number of reports appeared about anti-social behaviour, including pitched battle. On Monday 11 July, an investigation started into the rape of an 18-year-old woman at the festival. A number of green fake ecstasy pills were recovered with many found to contain the dangerous stimulant paramethoxyamphetamine, known as PMA.

Police Scotland stated 429 crimes were reported at the festival, compared with 414 the previous year. Although the number of arrests were down from 57 in 2015 to 54. The traffic chaos from the 2015 events was not repeated with reports of cars and buses moving freely.

== See also ==
- List of music festivals in the United Kingdom
