= George Buchanan (disambiguation) =

George Buchanan (1506–1582) was a Scottish humanist.

George Buchanan may also refer to:

- Sir George Buchanan (soldier) (died 1651), Scottish soldier during the Wars of the Three Kingdoms
- George Buchanan (surgeon) (1827–1905), Scottish surgeon
- Sir George Buchanan (physician) (1831–1895), Chief Medical Officer (UK)
- Sir George Buchanan (diplomat) (1854–1924), British diplomat
- George Buchanan (engineer, born 1790) (1790–1852), Scottish civil engineer and land surveyor
- Sir George Buchanan (engineer, born 1865) (1865–1940), British civil engineer
- Sir George Seaton Buchanan (1869–1936), senior medical officer of the Ministry of Health (UK) and OIHP president
- George Buchanan (politician) (1890–1955), Scottish politician
- George Wesley Buchanan (1921–2019), American professor of theology
- George A. Buchanan (1842–1864), recipient of the Medal of Honor for actions in the American Civil War
- George Duncan Buchanan (c. 1935–2012), Anglican Bishop of Johannesburg
