= Clan Buchanan =

Highland Scottish clan

- Na Cananaich
- Crest: A hand coupee holding a ducal cap, or duke's cornet, proper, with two laurel branches wreathed surrounding the crest, disposed orleways proper.
- Motto: Clarior hinc honos "The Brighter Hence the Honour" or "Henceforth forward the honour shall grow ever brighter"
- War cry: Clar Innes

Profile
- Region: Highlands
- District: Stirling
- Plant badge: Bilberry and Oak
- Pipe music: "The Return of the Chief" by Richard Harris, 2016

Chief
- John Michael Baillie-Hamilton Buchanan of that Ilk
- The Buchanan
- Seat: Cambusmore
- Historic seat: Buchanan Auld House and Clairinch island
Septs of Clan Buchanan
The Septs of Clan Buchanan derive from the first Auselan to use the surname Buchanan, Gilbert, whose father had obtained the Buchanan lands, and his brothers Colman and Methlan, grandson Maurice, and great-grandson Walter. For names spelled with Mac also read as Mc
Bohanan, Bohanon, Bohannan, Bohannon, Buchannan, Buchannon, Buchanon, Buxton*, Colman*, Cormack*, Cousland*, Dewar*, Dove*, Dow*, Dowe, Gibb*, Gibbon*, Gibson*, Gilbert, Gilbertson*, Harper*, Harperson*, Leavy*, Lennie*, Lenny*, MacAldonich*, MacAlman*, MacAslan*, MacAslin*, MacAuselan*, MacAuslan*, MacAusland*, MacAuslane*, MacAlman*, MacAlmont*, MacAmmond*, MacAsland*, MacChruiter*, MacColman*, MacCormack*, MacCubbin*, MacCubbing*, MacCubin*, MacGeorge*, MacGibbon*, MacGreuisich*, MacGubbin*, MacInally*, MacIndeor*, MacIndoe*, MacKinlay*, MacKinley*, MacMaster*, MacMaurice*, MacMurchie*, MacMurchy*, MacNeur*, MacNuir*, MacNuyer*, MacQuattie*, MacWattie**, MacWherter, MacWhirter*, Masters*, Masterson*, MacCaslin*, Morrice*, Morris*, Morrison*, Murchie*, Murchison*, Richardson*, Risk*, Rusk*, Ruskin*, Spittal*, Spittel*, Walter*, Walters*, Wason*, Waters*, Watson*, Watt*, Watters*, Weir*, Yuill*, Yool*, Yule*, Youll*, Zuill*.
*Asterisked (*) sept names are sourced from Scots Kith & Kin. 1900. Edinburgh: Albyn Press, Ltd. for Clan House, Lindsay & Co. Ltd., s.d. (c1960, reprint of 1900 first edition). 94 pp. + fold-out map.
Clan branches
Auchneven, Leny, Arnprior, Spittall, and Auchmar
Allied clans
Clan Campbell
Clan Graham
Rival clans
Clan MacLaren

Clan Buchanan (Scottish Gaelic: Na Cananaich [nə ˈkʰanənɪç]) is a Highlands Scottish Clan whose origins are said to lie in the 1225 grant of lands on the eastern shore of Loch Lomond to clergyman Sir Absalon of Buchanan by the Earl of Lennox.

== History ==
=== Etymology ===
The name is said to derive from Macauselan (meaning son of Anselan). The following two names are given as the root of the territorial name Buchanan, Mac a Chanonaich (The Son of the Canon) and Buth Chanain (meaning house or seat of the canon).

=== 11th-13th centuries and origins ===
Traditionally, the clan's origin traced the chiefly line back to Anselan O Kyan, who was of the Irish clan Ó Catháin, a provincial king of north Ulster (and had his seat in Limavady, in present-day County Londonderry). He is said to have landed in Argyll in 1016. According to this tradition, for his services against the Danes he received from king Malcolm II the lands of Buchanan, which lie to the east of Loch Lomond around the village of Killearn.

During the reign of Malduin, Mormaer (Earl) of Lennox, 1217–1250, Anselan (third of that name) was granted, in 1225, the island of Clairinch. (Clár Inis). He is referred to as 'clericus meus', meaning 'my clergyman'. He is subsequently recorded as Absalom de Buchanan and it is understood that to have this title, there must have been other grants of land in the parish of Buchanan. During the reign of King Alexander II (1214–1249), Gilbert de Buchanan, seneschal to the Earl of Lennox, received, in 1231, a charter confirming Clareinch (or Clairinch) and other lands in Buchanan. It is from the lands of Buchanan that the Clan name is derived.

However, the traditional accounts of the origin of the clan, the land and name derivation in Scotland are inconsistent with other historical accounts for the previous period in Ireland, as well as the data from the extensive DNA project, and is officially considered to be little more than origin myth.

According to the official publication provided to the Clan Buchanan Society International, "There is a strong DNA link to the Clan Gregor which seems to indicate a common ancestor around the year 400 A.D." This discovery made through extensive genetic testing information collected provides further proof of the existence of Clan Buchanan well before any previously thought of origin myth.

=== 14th century and Wars of Scottish Independence ===
Unenviable William Wallace Link. Sir Maurice Buchanan 10th of Buchanan married Margaret Menteith. Margaret was the daughter of Sir Walter Menteith of Rusky, and granddaughter of Sir John of Menteith, Sheriff of Dunbarton Castle, and Helena daughter of Gartnait, Earl of Mar. Sir John is reputed to have betrayed Sir William Wallace to King Edward I of England on 5 Aug 1305. Sir John was imprisoned by king Robert I but in 1314 "through influence of his sons-in-law; Malice, Earl of Strathern; Sir Archibald Campbell, of Lochow; and Maurice Buchanan, of Buchanan, he was released immediately before the Battle of Bannockburn, where he deported himself valiantly on the part of the Scottish king." Sir John was also a signatory to the Declaration of Arbroath in 1320.

During the Wars of Scottish Independence the Clan Buchanan supported King Robert the Bruce by aiding his escape in 1306, the chief, Maurice 9th of Buchanan, refused to sign the Ragman Roll, and the chief and lairds of the clan (and presumably their clansmen) served under Malcolm the Earl of Lennox. It is tradition and likely given the aforementioned service, but ill-documented, that the clan fought at the Battle of Bannockburn.

During the reign of King David II (1324–1371), undated, at least part of the lands of Buchanan belonged to Sir Gilbert Carrick.

During the reign of Donald Mormaer (Earl) of Lennox (1333–1365), and confirmed by King David II in 1370/71, "Confirmation is of a charter by Donald, Earl of Lennox, in favour of Maurice Buchanan, son and heir of late Maurice Buchanan, of that carucate of land called Buchanan with Sallochy, with these bounds ie Akehin up to Aldmarr [Auchmar] just as it descends below the water of Hanerch [Endrick], and the land of Sallochy, with these bounds, from Sallochy all along to Kelg and then it descends to the water of Lochlomon [Loch Lomond], to hold in fee and with the freedom to hold as many courts with jurisdiction of life and limb as he may wish."

=== 15th century, Hundred Years' War and other clan conflicts ===
c 1445 The arms of Buchanan (Le sire de bouguenal)

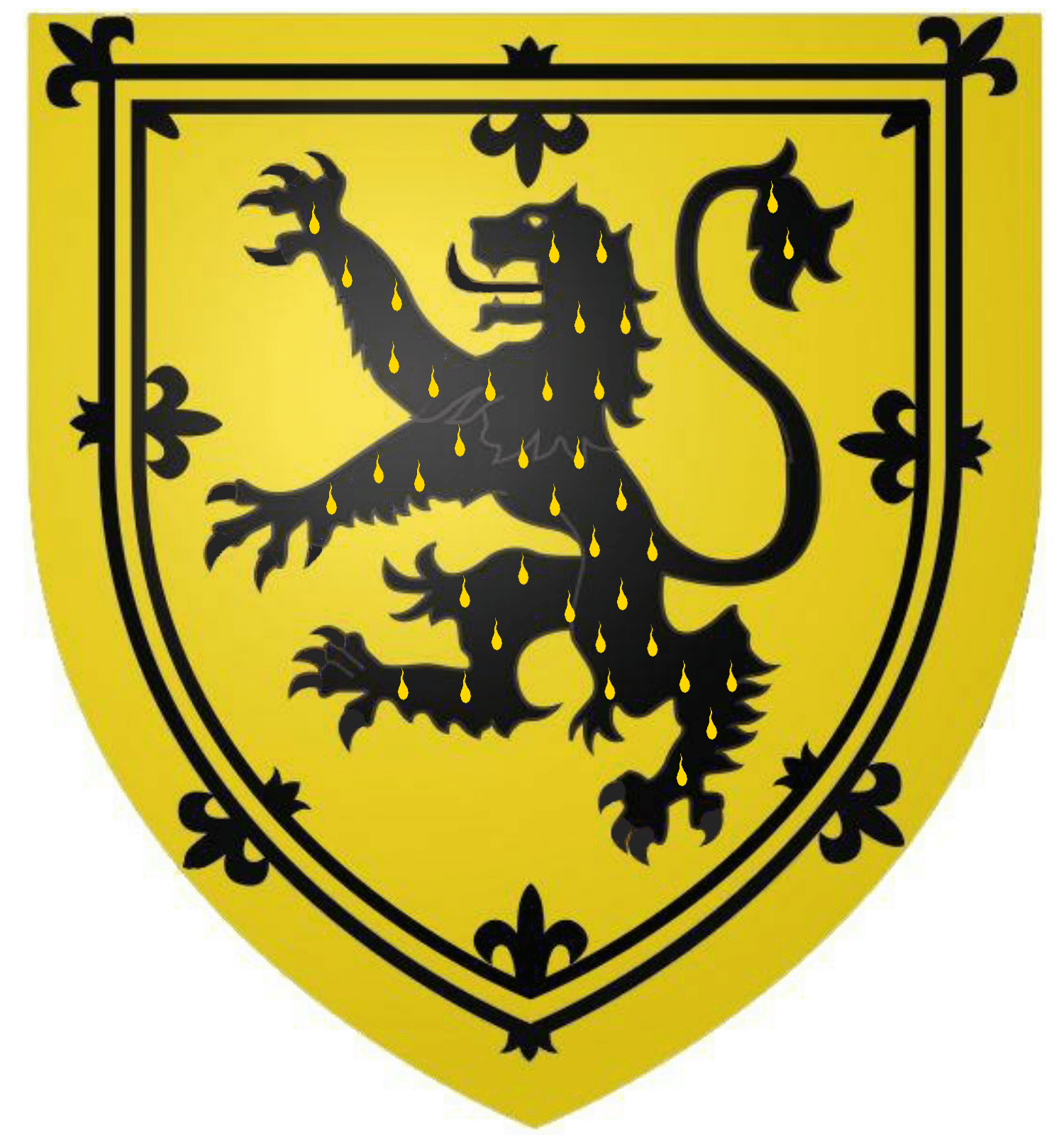
c 1455 The arms of Buchanan (Bachanane)

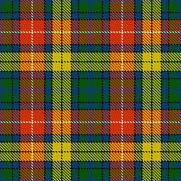
Modern Tartan

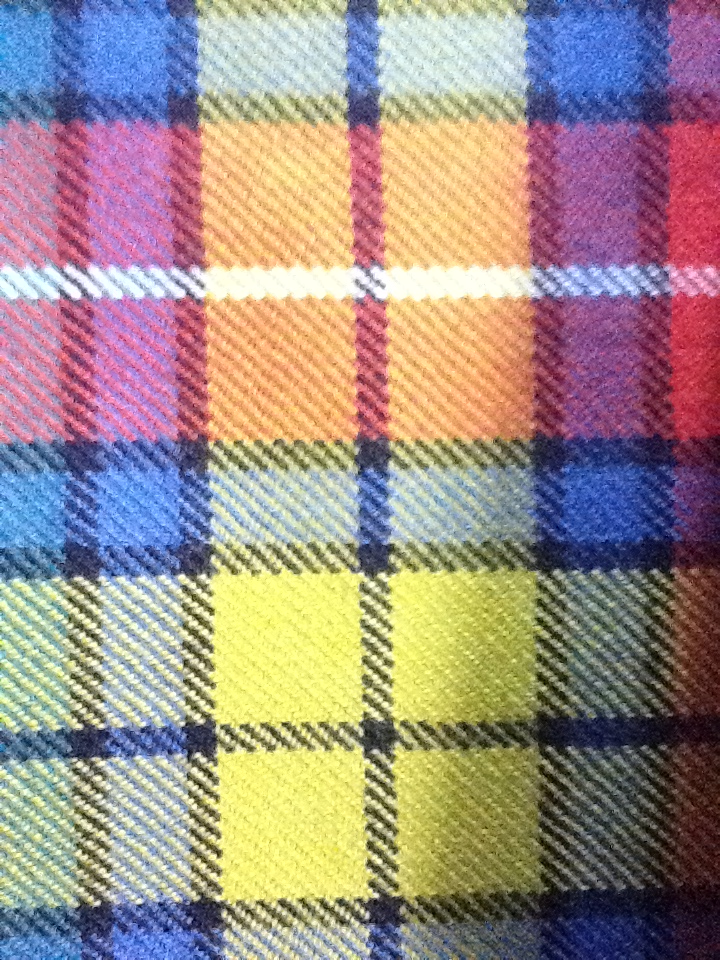
Ancient Tartan

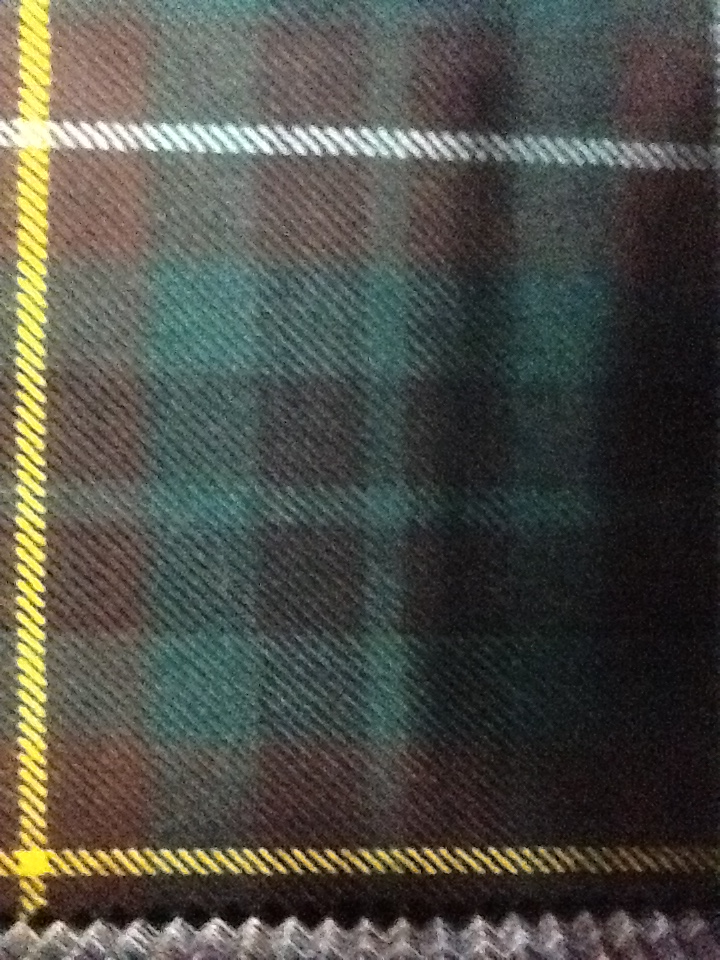
Hunting Tartan

Sir Alexander Buchanan, second son of Walter Buchanan of Buchanan, led men of the clan in support of the French against the English at the Battle of Baugé in 1421. It is said that Sir Alexander Buchanan came face to face with the Duke of Clarence and, escaping his thrust, pierced the Duke through the left eye, killing him. Sir Alexander Buchanan however was later killed leading the clan against the English at the Battle of Verneuil in 1424.

The 15th century is a watershed in the evolution of Buchanan heraldry. In the Armorial de Berry, c 1445 the arms of Buchanan (Le sire de bouguenal) are Or (gold/yellow), chevron checky of Azure (Blue) and Argent (silver/white), and the three boars heads erased and erect of Gules (red). The following three events are believed to have resulted in a total transformation in the Chief's arms:

1421 - The Battle of Baugé in which Sir Alexander Buchanan (son of the Chief) killed the Duke of Clarence (second son of King Henry IV of England).

1425 – Execution by King James I of Scotland, of his first-cousin, Murdoch Stewart, Duke of Albany, and Murdoch's two older sons for treason.

1443 – Marriage of Isobel Stewart (daughter of Murdoch Stewart) to Sir Walter Buchanan.

The arms described in the Scots Roll, c. 1455, 'Or, a lion rampant Sable goutty Or within a double tressure flory counter-flory Sable', contain many of the elements of the arms registered by John Buchanan in 1657, the coat of arms we recognise today. The adoption of the double tressure flory counterflory into the Chief's arms alludes to the nearness of the Buchanan chiefly line to that of the Scottish royal line by the marriage of Isobel Stewart. The Chief's 1657 crest (which also is the centrepiece of clan folk's badge) is a hand couped at the wrist holding a ducal cap, which celebrates Sir Alexander Buchanan's slaying of the Duke of Clarence in combat. However, the seal of George Buchanan c1557, 'Three (bear or boar) heads erased', is similar to the 1445 arms.

In the 15th century, a feud broke out between the Buchanans of Leny and the Clan MacLaren resulting in a full-scale battle. On the day of a fair where the Clan MacLaren were busy buying, selling and enjoying themselves word came that the Clan Buchanan were marching up towards them through Strathyre. There was no time to lose and the Clan MacLaren rushed to arms. The MacLarens had not all come in by the time the Buchanans arrived, however, they were not daunted and attacked the Buchanans. At first, the Buchanans were faring better and drove the MacLarens back. The Chief of MacLarens saw one of his sons cut down and being suddenly seized with battle madness turned and shouted the famous MacLaren battle cry "Creag An Tuirc" and whirling his Claymore rushed furiously at the enemy. His clansmen followed him and the Buchanans were cut down like corn. Only two escaped by swimming the River Balvaig but even they were followed. One was cut down at Gartnafuaran and the second was cut down at a place since known by the circumstance as "Sron Laine."

In 1497 Kenneth Mackenzie, 8th of Kintail, Chief of Clan Mackenzie was killed by the Laird of Buchanan.

=== 16th century, Anglo-Scottish Wars and the King of Kippen ===
During the Anglo-Scottish Wars the Clan Buchanan fought against the English at the Battle of Flodden in 1513 where the chief's elder son Patrick was killed. However, Patrick had already married a daughter of the Earl of Argyll and had two sons and daughters. Later the Clan Buchanan fought against the English at the Battle of Pinkie Cleugh in 1547.

John Buchanan, the second son of Walter Buchanan the 14th of Buchanan and uncle of George Buchanan the 15th of Buchanan, became proprietor of Arnprior, and afterwards, the noted "King of Kippen", a phrase which originated in a whimsical episode between himself and King James V. The story is well retold by Sir Walter Scott in the following paragraph.

When King James V travelled in disguise he used a name that was known only to some of his principal nobility and attendants. He was called the Goodman (the tenant, that is) of Ballengeich. Ballengeich is a steep pass that leads down behind the Castle of Stirling. Once upon a time when he was feasting in Stirling, the King sent for some venison from the neighbouring hills. The deer was killed and put on horse's backs, to be transported to Stirling. Unluckily they had to pass the castle gates of Arnpryor, belonging to a chief of the Buchanans, who had a considerable number of guests with him. It was late, and the company were rather short of victuals, though they had more than enough of liquor. The chief, seeing so much fat venison passing his very door, seized on it; and to the expostulations of the keepers, who told him it belonged to King James, he answered insolently, that if James was King in Scotland, he, Buchanan, was King in Kippen, being the name of the district in which the Castle of Arnpryor lay. On hearing what had happened, the King got on horseback and rode instantly from Stirling to Buchanan's house, where he found a strong fierce-looking Highlander, with an axe on his shoulder, standing sentinel at the door. This grim warder refused the King admittance, saying, that the Laird of Arnpryor was at dinner, and would not be disturbed. "Yet go up to the company my good friend," said the King, "and tell him that the Goodman of Ballengeich is come to feast with the King of Kippen." The porter went grumbling into the house, and told his master, that there was a fellow with a red beard, who called himself the Goodman of Ballengeich, at the gate, who said he was come to dine with the King of Kippen. As soon as Buchanan heard these words, he knew that the King was there in person, and hastened down to kneel at James's feet and to ask forgiveness for his insolent behaviour. But the King, who only meant to give him a fright, forgave him freely and going into the castle feasted on his own venison which Buchanan had intercepted. Buchanan of Arnpryor was ever afterwards called the King of Kippen.

=== 17th century, Wars of the Three Kingdoms and loss of the Buchanan Estate ===
During the Wars of the Three Kingdoms Sir George Buchanan commanded the Stirlingshire Regiment and led the clan at the Battle of Dunbar (1650) on the side of the Scottish Covenanters. He later led the clan at the Battle of Inverkeithing but here he was captured and died in captivity later the same year. It is claimed that in Buchanan's Stirlingshire Regiment "most of his officers and a good many of the soldiers" were of the name Buchanan, and that at the Battle of Inverkeithing a "vast number of the name Buchanan" died. Other Buchanans involved with the Royalist cause include:

1. David Buchanan, Royalist soldier captured at Worcester. Transported on the John and Sarah, from Gravesend 13 May 1652 to Boston.
2. John Buchanan, Royalist soldier captured at Worcester. Transported on the John and Sarah, from Gravesend 13 May 1652 to Boston.

Some Buchanans fought on the side of the Covenanters at the Battle of Bothwell Brig in 1679. One was George Buchanan (1657–1719) (later a magistrate, maltman (whisky distiller) and successful Glasgow merchant), the son of Andrew Buchanan of Gartacharne (a small farm (56.057589°N 4.41747°W) 2 km due south-east of Drymen). George was the father of four of Glasgow's most distinguished citizens: George Buchanan of Moss and Auchentoshan (maltman and Glasgow city treasurer and bailie), Andrew Buchanan of Drumpellier (Tobacco Lord and Lord Provost of Glasgow), Archibald Buchanan of Silverbanks and Auchentortie (Tobacco Lord) and Neil Buchanan of Hillington (Tobacco Lord and Member of Parliament for Glasgow district of burghs). These four sons were among the founding members of the charity, The Buchanan Society of Glasgow.

The full scope of Buchanan Covenanters is unknown; however,

1. Alexander Buchanan, Buchlivie, Covenanter, was sent from Tollbooth, 12 Dec 1678, on St. Michael of Scarborough, to Themes for on forwarding to the American plantations.
2. Andrew Buchanan, Shirgarton, Covenanter, was sent from Tollbooth, 12 Dec 1678, on St. Michael of Scarborough, to Themes for on forwarding to the American plantations.
3. Gilbert Buchanan, Glasgow, banished to the Indies, 13 Jun 1678.

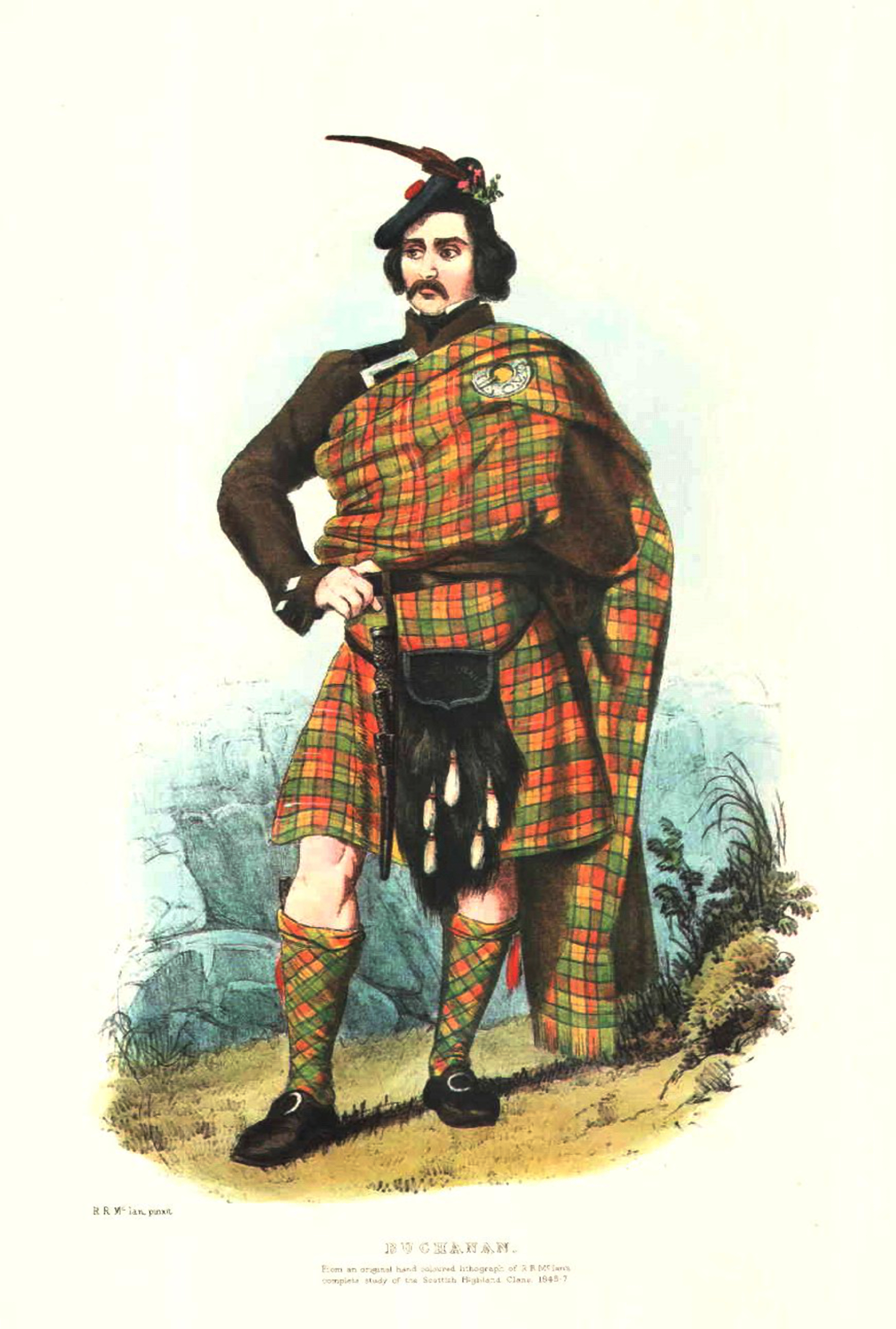
A romantic depiction of a clan gentleman, illustrated by R. R. McIan, from James Logan's The Clans of the Scottish Highlands, 1845.

Regarding the Buchanan Estate (c. 1681), according to William Buchanan of Auchmar, "The most flourishing condition it has been in, for diverse ages, was upon the last laird's accession to it" (c. 1652) (by 'the last laird,' he was referring to John Buchanan, son of Sir George Buchanan.) At this time the estate included the Barony of Buchanan, "several lands in the parishes of Killearn, Strathblane, and others in Lennox" (Strablane is likely to be Strathblane which is between the parishes of Killearn and Lennox); "the whole estate of Badindalloch" (in Stirlingshire); and "the estate of Craigmillar in Midlothian". Along with the inheritance of the estate and clan chiefship, there was significant debt. John Buchanan was unwilling to receive his inheritance until his brother-in-law to be, David Erskine, 2nd Lord Cardross, arranged for creditors to accept as payment only a portion of what was owed (a composition). Debt continued to plague John Buchanan, and in about 1680, he and his named successor, Major George Grant (alias Major George Buchanan of that Ilk), sold some of the Highland lands to James Grahame, the Third Marquess of Montrose. It appears that there were other claimants to the Highland lands and as a guarantee that the sale would proceed, John Buchanan offered the Barony of Buchanan as security (an infeftment of real warrandice). It transpired that the sale did not proceed and the Marquess of Montrose became the owner of the Barony of Buchanan and it became the seat of Clan Graham. Prior to the sale, John Buchanan of Arnpryor had been the estate manager for John Buchanan. After the sale, John Buchanan of Arnpryor received a quarter of the estate from the Marquess of Montrose for his services and assistance in evicting the whole estate. (Precisely what his services were and the meaning of "evicting the whole estate" is unclear.)

=== 18th century and 19th century and Jacobite uprisings ===
As a unified entity, Clan Buchanan took no part in the Jacobite uprisings of 1715 to 1716 or the 1745 to 1746 uprising. A likely contributing factor was the leadership vacuum resulting from the death of the last Chief in c. 1681. There is clear evidence of some Buchanans supporting the Jacobite cause (including the reintroduction of the absolute monarchy of the Stuarts) while others were supporting the Government cause (including the continuance of the limited monarchy of the Hanoverians: limited by law and Parliament).

Jacobite supporters.

1) Alexander Buchanan, born 1728, son of the Laird of Auchleishie, Callander, Perthshire, Stirlingshire, Jacobite Captain in the Duke of Perth's Regiment, prisoner at Perth, Canongate, Carlisle, ship, and London; transported 22 Apr 1747 from Liverpool to the Colony of Maryland on the ship "Johnson",

2) John Buchanan, servant to Alexander Buchanan, resident of Auchterarder, Perthshire, Jacobite in the Duke of Perth's Regiment, prisoner at Auchterarder, Stirling, and Carlisle; transported 24 Feb 1747 on the ship "Gildart" to the Colony of Maryland.

3) John Buchanan, brewer from Kilmahog, Callander. Joined the Jacobites and went with them to Crieff. Released.

4) Francis Buchanan, of Arnpryor, Lenny House, Callander. Arrested before battle of Culloden for stockpiling weapons. Tried for high treason and executed at Carlisle 18 Oct 1746. Writing to Philip Webb on 9 Sep 1746, Lord Milton, the Lord Justice Clerk, said of Francis Buchanan that it would be of "more consequence to His Majesty's Service ... to get rid of such a person than to convict 99 of the lowest rank." For further details on whether Francis Buchanan of Arnprior was the chief of the clan, see the section below.

5) Patrick Buchanan, brother of Francis Buchanan of Arnpryor, brewer from Kilmahog, Callander. Joined the Jacobites in the Duke of Perth's Regiment and went with them to Crieff. Tried at Carlisle and acquitted on account of his youth.

6) Thomas Buchanan, brother of Francis Buchanan of Arnpryor. Tried and acquitted on account of his youth.

7) Robert Buchanan, Jacobite Captain in the Duke of Perth's Regiment, son of Baillie Buchanan in Boghastle, Callander. Killed at Culloden.

8) John Buchanan, in Stuart of Appin's Regiment, died in prison.

9) John Buchanan, in Gordon of Glenbuckett's Regiment, from Inverness-shire, assumed died at Culloden.

10) John Buchanan, servant to David Stewart of Ballachallan in Strathallan's Perthshire Horse. Subsequent condition unknown.

11) Duncan Buchanan, prominent Jacobite agent and clerk to Aeneas MacDonald, the banker to Charles Edward Stuart in Paris. He was one of "The Seven Men of Moidart." Subsequent condition unknown.

Government supporters.

A list of Buchanans serving in British Army, Royal Navy or other Government roles at the time of the Jacobite uprisings has yet to be compiled.

1) Andrew Buchanan of Drumpellier, Tobacco Lord and Lord Provost of Glasgow (1740–42). After the Jacobite victory at the Battle of Prestonpans (21 Sep 1745), John Hay, quarter-master of Prince Charles' Jacobite Army, arrived at Glasgow 25 Sep 1745 with a letter demanding a loan of £15,000. Buchanan and five others were chosen to negotiate with Hay and succeeded in obtaining a reduction to £5,500. On account of Buchanan's zeal in raising new levies on behalf of the government, the Jacobites demanded in December 1745 a special levy of £500 from him. Despite threats of military execution, he replied "they might plunder his house if they pleased, for he would not pay one farthing."

2) Archibald Buchanan of Drummakill (alternative spellings: Drumnakil, Drumakiln and Drumnakiln), overt supporter of the Government, magistrate and militia officer. After the defeat at Culloden on 16 Apr 1746, the escaping William Murray, Marquis of Tullibardine, took refuge in the Loch Lomond house of Archibald Buchanan of Drummakill (husband of Tullibardine's cousin). Depending on the source, Drummakill accepted the surrender of the exhausted Tullibardine, captured him or, in defiance of Highland hospitality norms, betrayed him to the garrison at Dumbarton Castle. Most sources cite the 'betrayal' version of events and advise that Drummakill was forever after ostracised in Scotland. Tullibardine died 9 Jul 1746 as a prisoner at the Tower of London.

== Clan Chiefs ==
Title of the Chief. The two main Clan historians, Buchanan of Auchmar writing in 1723 uses the term 'Laird of Buchanan', while Guthrie Smith writing in 1896 uses the term 'Laird of Buchanan' to describe the chiefs up to and including Sir Maurice the 10th of Buchanan and then 'Buchanan of that Ilk' up to and including Sir George the 15th of Buchanan and thereafter Buchanan of Buchanan. The chief of a Highland clan could be referred to as the 'Laird of', meaning the head of the clan (a patrimonial title), e.g. Laird of Buchanan. The title 'of that Ilk' was historically used by both Highland and Lowland clans to indicate head or chiefship (again a patrimonial title), e.g. Buchanan of that Ilk. However, in the early 19th century 'of that Ilk' fell out of favour with Highland chiefs who adopted a duplication of the patronymic, regardless of the ownership of territory or estate, e.g. Buchanan of Buchanan. Given the current Highland practice, Buchanan of Buchanan is likely to be the preferred contemporary title but for ease of reading and clarity, 'nth' of Buchanan is used in the following paragraphs. Both the spelling Buchanan and Buchannan are used interchangeably in historical documents.

=== The Chiefs ===
The first six Clan Chiefs are poorly represented in historical records and are included by some Clan historians and omitted by others. Buchanan of Auchmar and Guthrie Smith commence their respective numbering of Chiefs at a different person and describe a different order and number of Chiefs following Sir Walter 11th of Buchanan. In part, this is due to the heir apparent not succeeding to the chiefship before he dies and chiefship passing directly from grandfather to grandchild. The following lineage reconciles Guthrie Smith and Buchanan of Auchmar and their respective numbering is in parentheses.

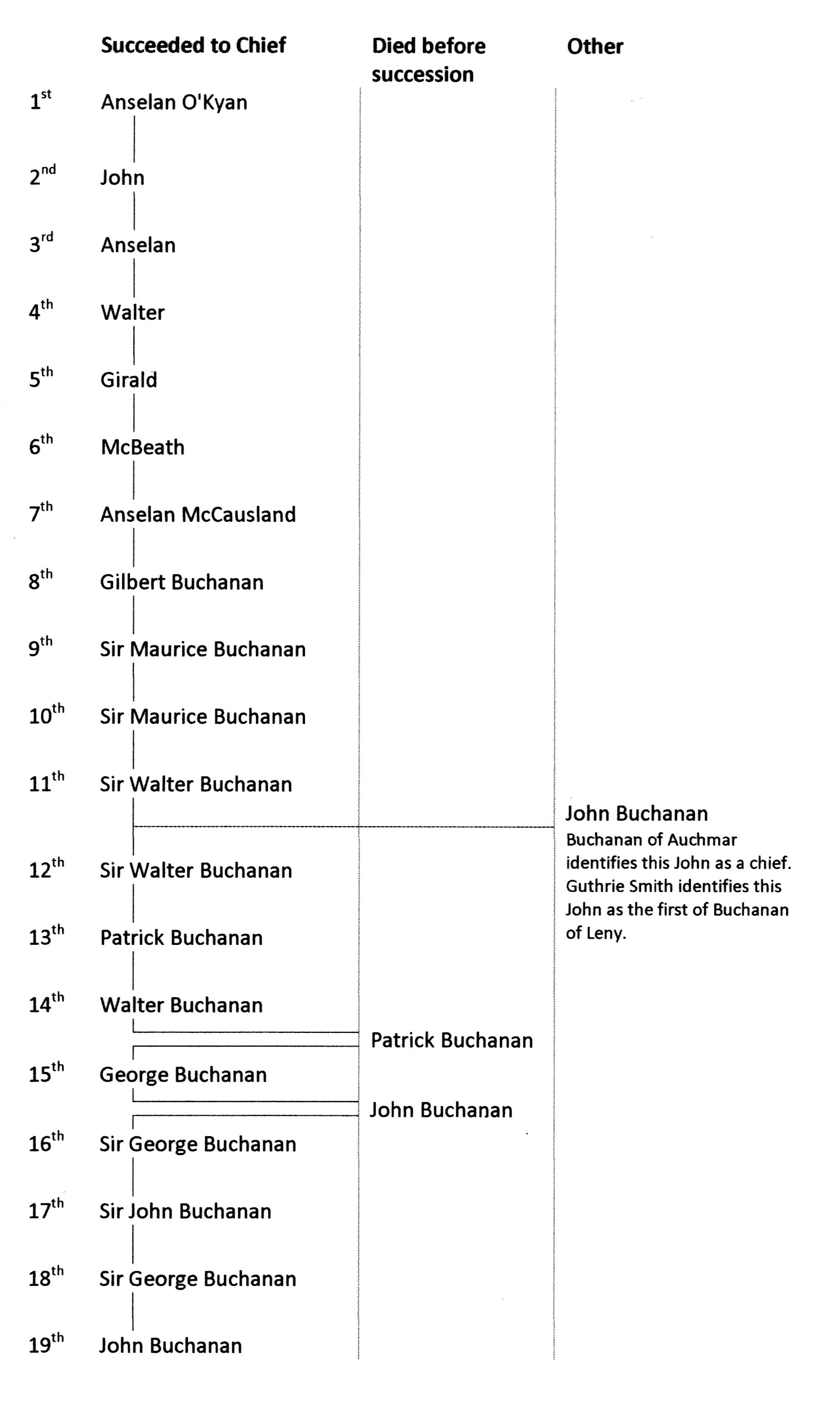
Succession of Clan Buchanan Chiefs

1st – Anselan O'Kyan, in the service of Malcolm II of Scotland from whom he received a grant of land in Lennox. He married an heiress of Denniestoun and by her had a son, John.

2nd – John, whose son and successor was Anselan.

3rd – Anselan, whose son and successor was Walter.

4th – Walter, whose son and successor was Girald.

5th – Girald also called Bernard, whose son and successor was McBeath.

6th – McBeath (MacBethe/McBeth) McCausland, whose son and successor was Anselan.

7th – Anselan McCausland, (Guthrie Smith identifies him as the 7th Laird of Buchanan and commences his numbering of Chiefs from him.) Seneschal to Earl of Lennox in about 1225 and obtained the charter for the Loch Lomond island of Clairinch (the Clan's call to war, alternatively rendered as Clairinsh or Clar Innis), had three sons (Gilbert his successor, Methlin the ancestor of the MacMillans, and Coleman the ancestor of the MacColemans).

8th – Gilbert Buchanan, (Guthrie Smith identifies him as 2nd Chief and Buchanan of Auchmar identifies him as 8th Chief) whose son and successor was Maurice.

9th – Sir Maurice Buchanan (dec. about 1370), (Guthrie Smith identifies him as 3rd Chief and Buchanan of Auchmar identifies him as 9th Chief) had three sons (Maurice his successor, Allan who married the heiress of Leny and John the first ancestor of the cadets of Auchneiven). Hugh Peskett's charts of the Buchanan chiefly lineage in the 2016 petition to the Lord Lyon King of Arms for Scotland shows this Maurice as the 10th Chief.

10th – Sir Maurice Buchanan (dec. 1373), (Guthrie Smith identifies him as 4th Chief and Buchanan of Auchmar identifies him as 10th Chief) lived to a considerable age, married the daughter of Sir William Menteith of Rusky and by her a son and successor (Walter). Hugh Peskett's charts show this Maurice as the 11th Chief.

11th – Sir Walter Buchanan, (Guthrie Smith identifies him as 5th Chief and Buchanan of Auchmar identifies him as 11th Chief) married Margaret and had three sons (Walter his successor, Alexander who reputedly killed the Duke of Clarence at the Battle of Baugé on 21 March 1421 and who later died in the battle of Verneuil in 1424, and John [Buchanan of Auchmar identifies him as 12th Chief ] who married Janet the heiress of Leny and was the first ancestor of the cadets of Leny). Hugh Peskett's charts show this Walter as the 12th Chief from 1373.

12th – Sir Walter Buchanan, (Guthrie Smith identifies him as 6th Chief and Buchanan of Auchmar identifies him as 13th Chief) first married an unidentified women and by her three sons (Patrick his successor and Walter Drumikill and Carbeth) and one daughter. He married secondly to Isobel Stewart, daughter of Murdoch Stewart, Duke of Albany. Hugh Peskett's charts show this Walter as the 13th Chief.

13th – Patrick Buchanan (dec. bef. 1477), (Guthrie Smith identifies him as 7th Chief and Buchanan of Auchmar identifies him as 14th Chief) married Jonet Cunningham of Galbraith and by her a son (Walter his successor) and a daughter (Anabella). He also had an illegitimate son (Patrick). Hugh Peskett's charts show this Patrick as the 14th Chief.

14th – Sir Walter Buchanan (dec. 1526), (Guthrie Smith identifies him as 8th Chief and Buchanan of Auchmar identifies him as 15th Chief) married Isobel Graham and by her four sons (Patrick [Guthrie Smith identifies him as 9th Chief but then goes on to advise that the Chiefship passed from Patrick's father to Patrick's son and Buchanan of Auchmar identifies him as 16th Chief ] who married the daughter of the Earl of Argyle and by her had George who succeeded his grandfather; John first ancestor of cadets of Arnprior; Maurice; and Walter first ancestor of cadets of Spittal) and two daughters (Margaret and Elizabeth). Hugh Peskett's charts show this Walter as the 15th Chief.

15th – George Buchanan, (Guthrie Smith identifies him as 10th Chief and Buchanan of Auchmar identifies him as 17th Chief) succeeded his grandfather, Walter 14th of Buchanan, in 1526 and died 1560. He first married Margaret Edmonstone and by her a son (John [Guthrie Smith identifies him as 11th Chief, but then goes on to advise that the chiefship passed from John's father to John's son, George. Buchanan of Auchmar identifies him as 18th Chief who married Elizabeth Livingston and by her had George who succeeded his grandfather) and two daughters (Helen and Susanna). Second, he married Janet Cunningham and by her had a son (William first ancestor of the cadets of Auchmar) and a daughter (Margaret). Hugh Peskett's Chief numbering should continue with George as the 16th Chief.

16th – Sir George Buchanan, (Guthrie Smith identifies him as 12th Chief and Buchanan of Auchmar identifies him as 19th Chief) succeed his grandfather, George 15th of Buchanan, in 1561, married Lady Mary Graham and by her one son (John his successor) and two daughters (Helen and Susanna). Hugh Peskett's Chief numbering should continue with George as the 17th Chief.

17th – Sir John Buchanan, (Guthrie Smith identifies him as 13th Chief and Buchanan of Auchmar identifies him as 20th Chief) known for his frequent travels to foreign nations and other extravagances put the estate into much debt, married Annabel Erskin and by her two sons (George his successor and Walter). Hugh Peskett's Chief numbering should continue with John as the 18th Chief.

18th – Sir George Buchanan, (Guthrie Smith identifies him as 14th Chief and Buchanan of Auchmar identifies him as 21st Chief) married Elizabeth Preston and by her a son (John his successor) and three daughters (Helen, Agnes and Jean). Sir George commanded the Stirlingshire Regiment in the Civil Wars of Charles I, fought at the battle of Dunbar, and was taken prisoner at Inverkeithing. He died in prison in 1651. Hugh Peskett's Chief numbering should continue with George as the 19th Chief.

19th – John Buchanan, (Guthrie Smith identifies him as 15th Chief and Buchanan of Auchmar identifies him as 22nd Chief) married in 1653 Mary Erskine and by her a daughter (Elizabeth). After the death of Mary, he married in 1677 Jean Pringle and by her had a daughter (Janet). When he died in 1681, he left no male heirs. He made two attempts to pass the chiefship to suitable candidates by arranging their marriage to his oldest daughter (Elizabeth). Firstly to Robert Buchanan, Advocate (the son of John Buchanan of Arnprior), and secondly to Major George Grant (details in a following section). In both cases, Elizabeth refused these arranged marriages. Consequently, no arrangement was finalised by which chiefship could be passed on to the descendants of his daughter. He inherited significant debt and during his chiefship, significant parts of the Buchanan Estate were sold, and the final portions of it were lost due to defaulting on creditors. With the lack of male heirs, the direct chiefly line ended at this time. Hugh Peskett's Chief numbering should continue with John as the 20th Chief.

==== Current Clan Chief ====
A petition to claim the chiefship of Clan Buchanan was lodged with the Court of the Lord Lyon in December 2016 and in August 2018 Lord Lyon allowed the petition thus recognising John Michael Baillie-Hamilton Buchanan as the chief of Clan Buchanan. After a gap of 337 years, the clan now has a recognised chief. The Lord Lyon was satisfied that the petitioner:

- is the senior representative of the cadet branch of the chiefly line known as Buchanan of Leny, and that the remaining cadet branches of the chiefly line; namely Buchanan of Auchmar and Buchanan of Spittall, are extinct in law and in fact. (Descendants of Thomas Buchanan of Gartencaber were excluded from consideration because the C15th documents that purport to link him to the chiefly line were demonstrated to be forgeries.)
- has association with the chiefly lands of Strathyre and that these were conferred on him in an unbroken chain of inheritance. In circumstances like this, the "Jeffery" Principle can be applied.

==== Chiefs' Burial Ground ====
The reputed burial ground of the chiefs of Clan Buchanan is in the grounds of the Old Buchanan Parish Church 56.0683°N 4.4844°W. This church, the Chapel of St Mary & St Michael, served as a parish church after the abandonment of Inchcailleach in 1621 until a new church, in Milton of Buchanan, was built about 1764. Nothing now remains of the original chapel.

=== Other people with some measure of recognition as chief ===
The following four people have been cited as chief of Clan Buchanan but none appears to have been formally recognised by the Court of the Lord Lyon (the heraldry court of Scotland). Before addressing the claims to chiefship it is necessary to establish how the office and title of Chief are passed to succeeding generations in Scotland.

Patrilineal Descent. Firstly, the office and title are usually passed patrilineally (from father to child) in descending order of male birth then descending order of female birth, hence the oldest surviving son is the heir presumptive. If the heir presumptive produces no heirs, then on the heir presumptive's death the office and title go to the next younger son, etc., then the eldest daughter, etc. The term 'cadet' is used to describe family groups that are descendants of younger sons, thus the oldest surviving son of each generation maintains the main or principal family line, and younger sons establish cadet lines. In the case of the chiefly line of Buchanan, the first recognised cadet was Buchanan of Auchneiven and the last was Buchanan of Auchmar. Cadets can have their own cadets, e.g. Buchanans of Drumpellier, Auchintorlie, Craigend and Hillington are cadets of Buchanan of Leny through Gartacharne. When chiefly line is extinguished, the most recent cadet line to branch off the chiefly line becomes the new chiefly line.

Maintenance of Surname. Secondly the office and title are implicitly linked to the surname, thus a McKay, a Cairns, etc. cannot be chief of Clan Buchanan. In some cases, where the heir is a daughter, arrangements have been made so that her husband and children assume her surname, and thus the office and title can be passed to her offspring. This practice has given rise to the use of compound (hyphenated or 'double-barrelled') names. The matter of principal names was established by the Lord Lyon Innes of Learney when in the case of Monro-Lucas-Tooth that he was a Tooth rather than a Monro or Lucas. It is now clearly established that it is the last name that decides the matter. Thus by the Court of the Lord Lyon, a Moodie-Buchanan is considered a Buchanan but a Buchanan-Moodie is considered a Moodie. Further, in the case of a chief as the representer of the family, the surname cannot be a compound surname.

==== Major George Buchanan (alias Major George Grant) ====
Neither Guthrie Smith nor Buchanan of Auchmar identify him as a chief (hence why John Buchanan is the last recognised chief); however, Buchanan of Auchmar advises that John Buchanan transferred "his estate to an old comrade of his, Major George Grant, Governor of Dumbarton Castle, with this provision, that the Major should marry his eldest daughter, and assume the name and arms of Buchanan; reserving his own life-rent and his lady's jointure, and settling the estate so as to return to Buchanan's heirs-male, and, failing heirs of Grant's own body, to Buchanan's heirs whatsoever ." Despite George Grant never marrying the daughter of John Buchanan, National Archives of Scotland (NAS) records show the legal paperwork for this transfer occurred on 9 Apr 1679. NAS records show that by late 1679, George Grant had assumed the name George Buchanan and that by 28 Aug 1680 he was cited as being Major George Buchanan of that Ilk. (The use of the title, Buchanan of that Ilk, implies that George had taken over the chiefship but it might also imply that John Buchanan was deceased by 28 Aug 1680.) Major George Buchanan never married and by his death had "given up all Buchanan evidences, both the rights and the fortune."

==== Buchanan of Arnprior ====
Sir Walter Scott in 1830, cites Francis Buchanan of Arnpryor (alternative spelling: Arnprior), who was executed at Carlisle on 18 Oct 1746 for high treason for his role in the Jacobite uprising, as being the chief of the family Buchanan. Jesse (1846), Fillan (1849), The Scottish Antiquary (1890) and a history of Clan MacNab (1899) cites Francis Buchanan of Arnprior as being the Chief of Clan Buchanan. Francis Buchanan of Arnprior was the grandson of the John Buchanan of Arnprior who was the manager of the estate of John Buchanan of Buchanan (the last recognised Clan Chief who died c1681). Prior to the Chief's second marriage (1677), he had arranged for Elizabeth, the only child of his first marriage, to wed Robert Buchanan, son of John Buchanan of Arnprior, and in due course inherit the Buchanan estate and chiefship – a bond of Tailzie. This marriage did not take place and the arrangement was cancelled. Francis Buchanan of Arnprior married Elizabeth Buchanan, who was the daughter of Janet Buchanan, who was the second daughter of John Buchanan of Buchanan, i.e. Elizabeth was the granddaughter of John Buchanan of Buchanan (the only child of the Chief's second marriage). The Clan historian, William Buchanan of Auchmar, a contemporary of Francis Buchanan of Arnprior, notes that Francis Buchanan owned part of the old Buchanan lands but makes no reference to the supposed chiefship and, if anything, alludes to treachery to John Buchanan of Buchanan by John Buchanan of Arnprior (Francis Buchanan's grandfather). William Buchanan of Auchmar also makes no mention of Francis Buchanan having married the last chief's granddaughter. It is possible that Scott, a historical novelist, simply embellished the facts for literary purposes. Nevertheless, assuming that Scott, et al. are right and the chiefship had passed to Francis Buchanan (possibly via marriage to the heir of the last chief), then Buchanan of Auchmar may have misrepresented the Buchanans of Arnprior to bolster his own claim to the chiefship.

==== Buchanan of Auchmar claim ====
Alexander Nisbet in A System of Heraldry Vol 1, 1722, states that 'Buchannan of Lenie' is now the representor of 'Buchannan of that Ilk.' William Buchanan of Auchmar in his history of the clan, published in 1723, details a case that all cadet lines, except one, from George 15th of Buchanan to John Buchanan 19th of Buchanan had expired and on the death of the latter, the chiefship devolved to the cadet line most recently separated from the chiefly line, Buchanan of Auchmar, thus he, William Buchanan of Auchmar, is the chief of Clan Buchanan and that Nisbet is wrong in asserting that Buchanan of Leny is representer of the chiefly line. In Nisbet's (posthumously published) A System of Heraldry Vol 2, 1742, he recognises Buchanan of Auchmar as the successor of the chiefly line. In the 1826 claim for the chiefship by Dr Francis Buchanan-Hamilton, the extinction of both the main chiefly line and the Auchmar line are identified as preconditions to the claim. The later Clan historian, John Guthrie Smith, omits any reference to Buchanan of Auchmar's claim when he details the Buchanans of Auchmar.

William Buchanan. William Buchanan of Auchmar married in 1696 Jean Buchanan and by her three sons (John and Bernard who died before their father, and Alexander his successor) and three daughters (Janet, Katherine and Helen) who survived infancy. William died in 1747.

Alexander Buchanan. Alexander Buchanan of Auchmar married Christine Campbell and by her two sons (William his successor and James who succeeded his brother).

William Buchanan. William Buchanan of Auchmar sold his estate, reserving a right for redemption, he married in 1796 Sarah Bartlet. He died at sea off America the following year.

James Buchanan. James Buchanan sold the right of redemption for the estate of Auchmar. He died without an heir in 1816. This line is now recognised as extinguished.

==== Buchanan-Hamilton claim ====
With the expiration of the Auchmar cadet line and in the absence of other contenders, it is claimed that in 1828 that Dr. Francis Buchanan-Hamilton of Spittal, Bardowie, and Leny established his claim as Chief of Clan Buchanan. Francis was the son of Thomas Buchanan of Spittal and Leny (the Leny estate and title were inherited from Thomas' first wife), and Elizabeth Hamilton of Bardowie. In 1815 Francis inherited his mother's estate and adopted the additional surname of Hamilton. His claim to Clan Buchanan chiefship comes through the Buchanan of Spittal cadet line from the fourth son of Walter 14th of Buchanan. Similar to the Buchanan of Auchmar claim, this implies that any cadet lines from Walter 14th of Buchanan through to John 19th of Buchanan are extinguished. Adams cites the successor to Buchanan of Auchmar as being Buchanan of Leny; however, the term Leny here should be read as a territorial designation and not an indication of the cadet line.

Dr. Francis Buchanan-Hamilton. Dr. Francis Buchanan-Hamilton (1762–1829) married Anne Brock and by her a son (John).

John Buchanan-Hamilton. John Buchanan-Hamilton (1822–1903) married (1845) Margaret Seton and had three sons (Francis (1853–1893) who died unmarried and without heir, George (1856–1886) who died unmarried and without heir, and John his successor) and three daughters (Margaret (from whom the Buchanan-Jardine baronets descend), Ann and Katherine).

John Hamilton Buchanan. John Hamilton Buchanan (1861–1919) married in 1884 Phoebe Elizabeth Brock but appears to have left no heir. This line is now recognised as extinguished. It is noteworthy that John was named John Hamilton Buchanan, thus the Hamilton name adopted by his grandfather became John's middle name. This brought his name in line with the subsequent Lord Lyon ruling on compound names.

==== External evidence of historic claims ====
Edinburgh and London Gazettes. An on-line search of the historic Edinburgh Gazette and London Gazette for notices pertaining to 'laird of buchanan', 'buchanan of that ilk' or 'buchanan of buchanan' and the alternative spelling of 'Buchanan' reveal no supporting evidence for either the Buchanan of Auchmar or Buchanan-Hamilton claims.

The Buchanan Society. The Buchanan Society maintains and publishes a list of all past and current members by year of joining and membership number, and if provided, the relationship between its members, i.e. daughter of, great-grandson of, etc. The Buchanan Society Handbook 2004 lists

1. Francis Buchanan of Arnprior as joining (1727, #63). Estate is cited but no special status in the Clan.
2. William Buchanan of Auchmar as joining twice (1726, #48 and 1730, #123), and his grandson William Buchanan of Auchmar joining once (1794, #256). Both cited their estate but neither cited any special status in the Clan.
3. Francis Hamilton-Buchanan of Spittal, Bardowie and Leny (1771, #213); his son, John Buchanan-Hamilton of Spittal, Leny and Bardowie (1852, #410); and his grandson, John Hamilton Buchanan (Leny) Chartered Accountant (1882, #480) are likewise members of the Buchanan Society. Again estate and or occupation is listed but nothing to indicate any special status in the Clan.

Public Register of the Lyon Court. The last record in the Public Register of the Lyon Court for undifferenced Arms of Buchanan (i.e., the Chief's Arms) was recorded in 1675. Arms are meant to be rematriculated within a year and a day of succession; however, it is common practice that Arms be borne on apparency, that is without matriculating the Arms, for two or three generations, beyond this it may be difficult or impossible to demonstrate heirship. So while there may have been discussions and determinations within the Clan hierarchy regarding the Clan Chief, the claims of neither Buchanan of Auchmar (1723–1816) nor Buchanan-Hamilton (1828–1919) appear to have been ratified in a legal sense.

Despite a lack of evidence in the form of legal notices or recognition by the Lyon Court of either the Buchanan of Auchmar and Buchanan-Hamilton claims, both are known and accepted by contemporary or near contemporary authorities and authors. Noting that part of the Buchanan-Hamilton claim is that the cadet branch of Buchanan of Auchmar is extinct, Buchanan-Hamilton's wider cadet branch of Buchanan of Spittal would be a plausible starting point for search a hereditary claim on the chiefship of Clan Buchanan. However, in the event that a future hereditary claim is made, it is unlikely that the claim can build off either of the two earlier claims (because neither were recognised by the Lyon Court); consequently, it will be necessary to detail the claim back to 1675 and probably much earlier.

=== The 21st-century clan chief ===
Unlike the pre-18th-century chiefs, a 21st-century chief is not going to lead their clan in war or demand rents and levies. The experience of other clans is that their 21st-century chief:

1. adds to the clan's sense of completeness;
2. adds to the perceived prestige of the clan;
3. performs and adds dignity to ceremonial duties;
4. enables the clan to speak with one voice;
5. helps to focus clan effort on matters of clan wide interest;
6. represents clan interests in multi-clan forums;
7. promotes the right use of chiefly arms and associated heraldry;
8. promotes a general awareness and increased use of heraldry by the clan folk;
9. interacts with the clan society in a similar way to how a constitutional monarchy interacts with the elected governments of his or her subjects;
10. appoints lieutenants to represent them when they cannot be present; and
11. uses modern communications to achieve effective (sometimes synchronous) communication between him or herself, the lieutenants and the clan folk.

== Castles ==
The current seat of Clan Buchanan is Cambusmore. The historic seat of the Clan is Buchanan Auld House in Stirlingshire. Buchanan Castle was built in the 19th century as a replacement for Buchanan Auld House, after the surrounding lands had passed to the Grahams in the late 17th century. Other castles and monuments of the Clan Buchanan have included: Craigend Castle and Dunglass Castle (Dunbartonshire); Northbar House (Renfrewshire); and the Buchanan Monument at Killearn.

== Cadet Branches of the Chiefly line ==
The cadet branches in order of separation from the chiefly line: Leny, Arnprior, Spittal, and Auchmar.

Two other family lines, those of the ancient Drummikill and related Carbeth families may well be related to the chiefly line, particularly when considering the Y-DNA analysis. While the Y-DNA analysis can show a connection to the chiefly line, the documentary evidence must also demonstrate specific genealogical links when Lord Lyon considers a legal case relating to the chiefly line. Lord Lyon does not consider Y-DNA analysis.

It is clear that the Drummikill and Carbeth family lines are important in the clan's history. Historically, they have been included as cadet branches of the chiefly line. However, recent expert analysis of the document that purports to show a familial relationship with the chiefly line was considered not to be sufficiently credible.

== Septs ==
The Septs of Clan Buchanan derive from the first Auselan to use the surname Buchanan, Gilbert, whose father had obtained the Buchanan lands, and his brothers Colman and Methlan, grandson Maurice, and great-grandson Walter.

Calman, Colman*, Cormack*, Cousland*, Dewar*, Dove*, Dow*, Gibb*, Gibbon*, Gibson*, Gilbert, Gilbertson*, Harper*, Harperson*, Leavy*, Lennie*, Lenny*, MacAldonich*, MacAlman*, MacAslan*, MacAslin*, MacAuselan*, MacAuslan*, MacAusland*, MacAuslane*, MacAlman*, MacAlmont*, MacAmmond*, MacAsland*, MacChruiter*, MacCalman, MacColman*, MacCormack*, MacCubbin*, MacCubbing*, MacCubin*, MacGeorge*, MacGibbon*, MacGreuisich*, MacGubbin*, MacInally*, MacIndeor*, MacIndoe*, MacKinlay*, MacKinley*, MacMaster*, MacMaurice*, MacMurchie*, MacMurchy*, MacNeur*, MacNuir*, MacNuyer*, MacQuattie*, MacWattie**, MacWherter, MacWhirter*, Masters*, Masterson*, MacCaslin*, Morrice*, Morris*, Morrison*, Murchie*, Murchison*, Richardson*, Risk*, Rush**, Rusk*, Ruskin*, Spittal*, Spittel*, Walter*, Walters*, Wason*, Waters*, Watson*, Watt*, Watters*, Weir*, Yuill*, Yool*, Yule*, Zuill*.

- Asterisked (*) sept names are sourced from Scots Kith & Kin. 1900. Edinburgh: Albyn Press, Ltd. for Clan House, Lindsay & Co. Ltd., s.d. (c. 1960, reprint of 1900 first edition). 94 pp. + fold-out map.
- Asterisked (**) sept names are sourced from:

== Clan organisations ==
There are three contemporary organisations that represent Clan Buchanan.

=== The Buchanan Society ===
The Buchanan Society is a purely charitable organisation established in 1725 in Glasgow, Scotland, for the needy of the Clan for four "approved" Septs of the Clan: Buchanan, McAuslan, McWattie and Risk. The foundation of the Society featured the great trading houses of the Clan but from all corners of the globe, contemporary clan folk and friends of the Clan of all professions and occupations support this charity. The Society is funded by an entry fee paid by each member of the Society, gifts and interest from investments. Its original charter specified charity to those of the name Buchanan and recognised septs by assisting boys to trades and those of promising genius at their studies to university. Except that girls are now eligible for assistance, the goals have remained largely unchanged. The Society has been given many Clan heirlooms. The books, records and other collections of the Society are held at the Mitchell Library, Glasgow, and the Andersonian Library (Strathclyde University). The Society also owns the Buchanan Monument in Killearn, and the Loch Lomond island of Clairinch.

=== Clan Buchanan Society International ===
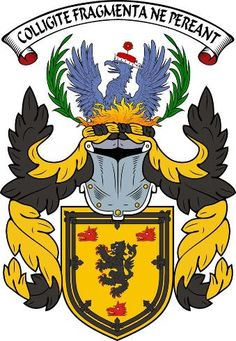
CBSI Coat of Arms

The Clan Buchanan Society International (CBSI) is a mutual interest society established in 1970 at the Grandfather Mountain Games in North Carolina to promote the celebration of being a Buchanan. Membership is by annual subscription and is greatest in the US, but as the organisation matures, new chapters are being established around the world, especially in the Oceania region.

CBSI Black Lion Banner

The CBSI Black Lion Banner. CBSI uses the coat of arms granted by the Lyon Court in 2002 on its official correspondence; however, it uses a self-assumed coat of arms which predate the granted arms on its flag, which is called the Black Lion Banner. The Black Lion Banner has a field of gold/yellow charged with a black lion rampant with red claws and tongue shedding five silver tears all within a black double tressure flory-counter-flory. (This might be described in heraldic language as, "Or, a lion rampant Sable, armed and langued Gules charged with five goutte Argent all within a double tressure flory-counter-flory of the second.") The lion rampant on the field of gold within the double tressure flory-counter-flory alludes to the arms of the Clan chief and is the charge and tressure of most Buchanan arms. The silver tears refer to the sadness of the Clan at not having a chief. A variation of the Black Lion Banner is used on some CBSI apparel.

=== Chief's Council of Armigers ===
A Chief's Council of Armigers is being considered and is likely to be established at the Chief's inauguration in 2022. Its aim is to optimise the strategic leadership of the Clan in order to promote Clan interests globally with due regard for tradition, Scottish law, and contemporary needs and opportunities. The council would subscribe to the view that the principal interest of the Clan is not power, influence, glory, history, heraldry nor even honour, per se; rather, it is the encouragement of the clan folk to learn, enjoy and celebrate their unique Buchanan, Highland, Scottish heritage. It is against this interest that the council's efforts are to be evaluated.

== New Chief ==
The Lord Lyon King of Arms has now recognised a new chief of the Clan Buchanan.

In August 2018 Michael Buchanan was confirmed by Lord Lyon, King of Arms, head of the Lyon Court in Scotland as Chief of the Name and Arms of Buchanan. He is the first Chief of the Clan in 337 years.

The Buchanan, John Michael Buchanan of that Ilk and Arnprior, was born on 14 September 1958. He is the son of John Neil Buchanan Baillie-Hamilton of Arnprior and Hon. Caroline Barbara Barrie. Michael married The Lady Buchanan, Paula Frances Hickman M.D., daughter of John Hickman, on 22 October 1994. He graduated from Oxford University, Oxford, Oxfordshire, England, with a Master of Arts (M.A.) Michael is the manager of Cambusmore Estate in the Southern Highlands near Callander.

== See also ==
- Buchanan (surname) for a list of famous Buchanans
- Scottish clan
