= Buchanan Auld House =

Ruined house in Scotland

- Buchanan Auld House in 2017

- Location in Stirlingshire
- 56°04′01″N 04°28′48″W

Listed Building – Category C(S)
- Designated: 5 September 1973
- Reference no.: LB4083

Buchanan Auld House (or Buchanan Old House) is a ruined house in Stirlingshire, Scotland, located 1.5 miles (2.4 km) west of the village of Drymen. Historic seat of the Clan Buchanan, the house was the property of the chiefs of Clan Buchanan who controlled the surrounding lands from at least 1231 until 1682. Following the death of John Buchanan in the late 17th century, the estate passed to the Grahams who substantially rebuilt the house during the 18th century. The property burned down in 1852 and James Graham, 4th Duke of Montrose commissioned the country house of Buchanan Castle as a replacement, which was built in 1852-1858 and stands 0.5 miles (0.80 km) to the southeast. The ruins of Buchanan Auld House exist today as part of a courtyard attached to the clubhouse of the Buchanan Castle Golf Club, which occupies the surrounding lands.

== History ==
The southern elevation of Buchanan Auld House.

During the 1217–1250 reign of Malduin, Mormaer (Earl) of Lennox, Anselan (third of that name) was granted in 1225 the island of Clairinsh. (Clár Inis). He is referred to as 'clericus meus', meaning 'my clergyman'. He is subsequently recorded as Absalom de Buchanan and it is understood that to have this title, there must have been other grants of land in the parish of Buchanan. During the reign of king Alexander II (1214–1249), Gilbert de Buchanan, seneschal to the Earl of Lennox, received in 1231 a charter confirming Clairinsh and other lands in Buchanan. It is from the lands of Buchanan that the clan name is derived. Buchanan Auld House became the seat of the chiefs of Clan Buchanan (the Lairds of Buchanan) over the next 450 years, until 1682 when the 22nd Chief John Buchanan died without any male heirs. Despite attempts to make provisions by which the chiefship could be passed on to the descendants of his daughters, no such arrangement was finalised. He had inherited significant debt; during his chiefship, the Buchanan estate was gradually sold to satisfy creditors. With the lack of male heirs, the direct chiefly line ended at this time.

The estate was purchased by James Graham, 3rd Marquess of Montrose, in 1682 and the house eventually replaced Mugdock Castle as the seat of Clan Graham, being seen as a dwelling more fitting the title of Marquess. The Montrose family substantially rebuilt the house from approximately 1724. The architect William Adam prepared designs for the house and parklands in 1745. In 1790, William Henry Playfair was commissioned by the James Graham, 3rd Duke of Montrose, to design alterations to the house. The 4th Duke and his wife raised and trained racehorses on the estate in the 19th century; their daughter, writer Violet, Lady Greville, was said to have enjoyed an ideal childhood here.

Buchanan Auld House was destroyed in a fire in 1852, and William Burn was commissioned by the 4th Duke to replace it. Burn designed an extravagant manor in the Scottish baronial style, enclosing an L-plan tower in a clutch of turrets, bartizans and stepped gables. This became Buchanan Castle, which was built in 1852-1858 and stands 0.5 miles (0.80 km) to the southeast.

The ruins of Buchanan Auld House, comprising part of the original servants' quarters, exist today as part of a courtyard attached to the clubhouse of the Buchanan Castle Golf Club, which occupies the surrounding lands.

== Gallery ==
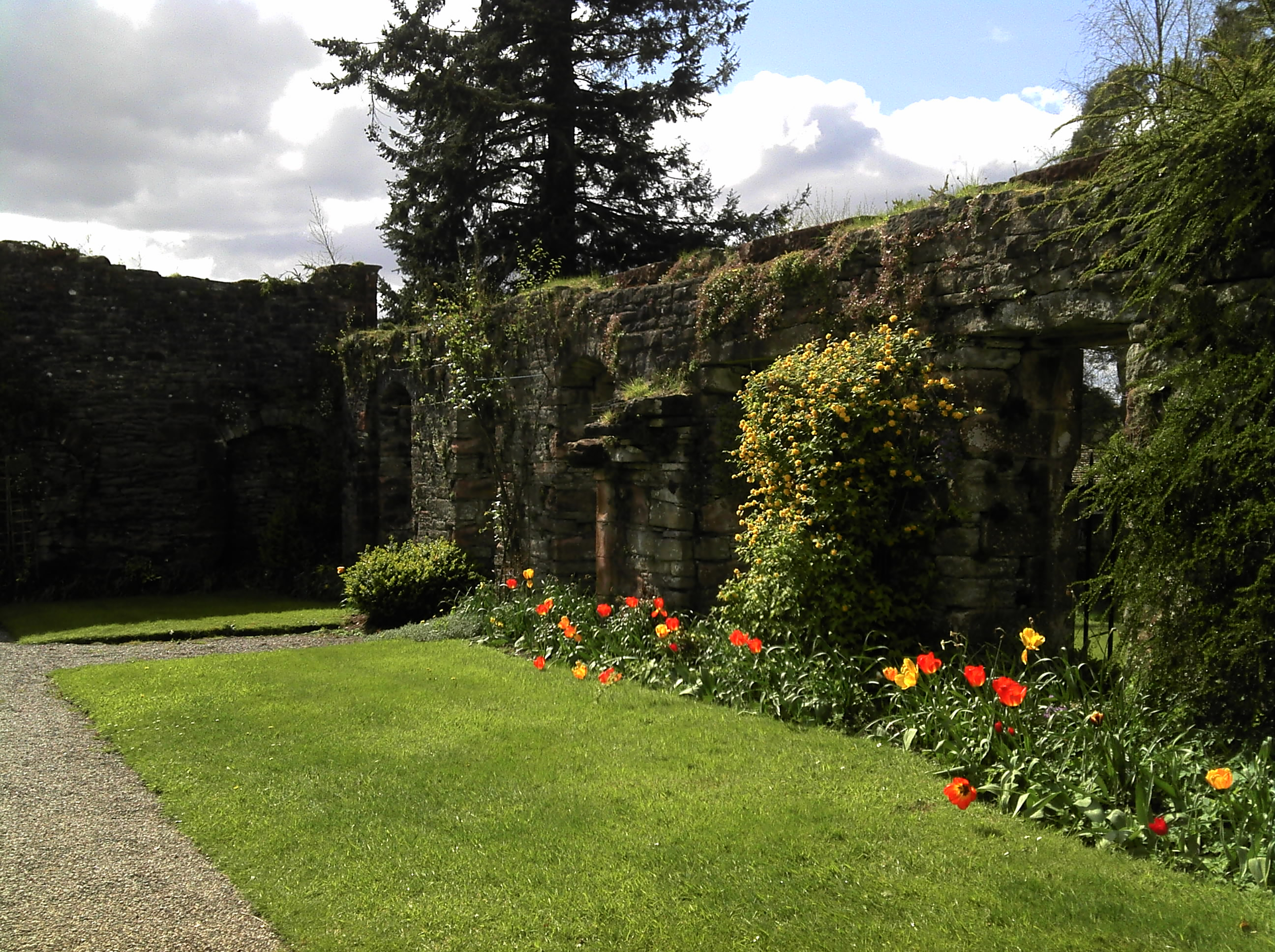
Courtyard formed by the ruins of Buchanan Auld House.

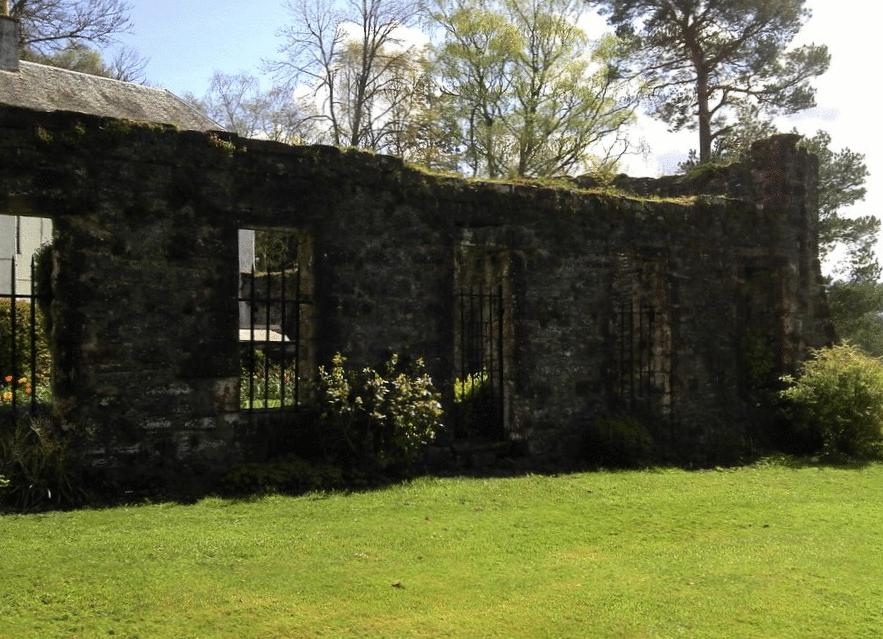
Exterior of the ruins of Buchanan Auld House.
