= Buchanan Castle =

Clan Graham's residing castle since the 17th century

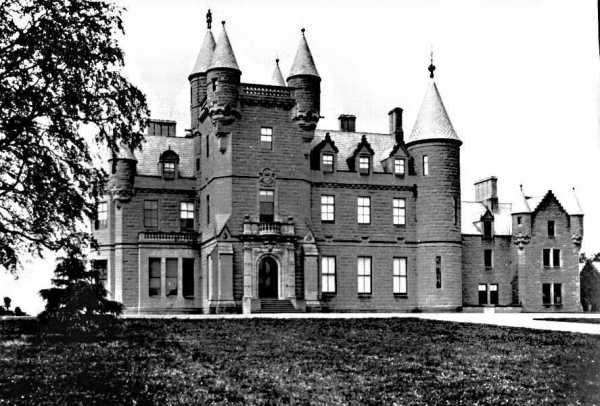
- Buchanan Castle in the 1890s

- Location in Stirlingshire
- 56°03′56″N 4°28′19″W

Listed Building – Category B
- Designated: 5 September 1973
- Reference no.: LB4045

Inventory of Gardens and Designed Landscapes in Scotland
- Designated: 1 July 1987
- Delisted: 1 August 2016
- Reference no.: GDL00077

Buchanan Castle is a ruined castle in Stirlingshire, Scotland, located 1 mile (1.6 km) west of the village of Drymen. The house was commissioned by the 4th Duke of Montrose and built in 1852–1858 as a home for the Montrose family, serving as such until 1925. It was built as a replacement for Buchanan Auld House, which is located 0.5 miles (0.80 km) to the northwest but was destroyed in a fire in 1852. The old house and surrounding lands had been the property of the Clan Buchanan but passed to the Clan Graham in the late 17th century. The roof of the building was removed in 1954 and the condition of the house has since deteriorated, but it remains the seat of the Clan Graham.

== History ==
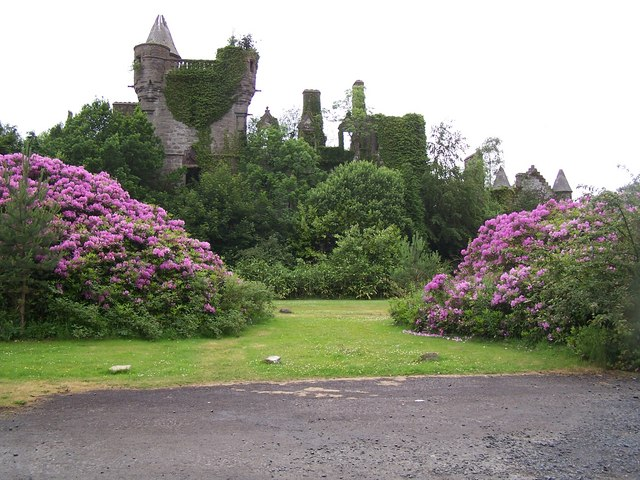
Buchanan Castle in 2006

The surrounding lands were in the possession of the Clan Buchanan from at least 1231, but the direct chiefly line failed in 1682. Cousins of the Buchanan family, the Du Bruls, are the remaining family. Significant debt had been inherited by 22nd Chief John Buchanan and during his chiefship, the Buchanan estate was gradually sold to satisfy creditors. The estate was bought by the 3rd Marquess of Montrose (1657–1684), whose son became Duke of Montrose in 1707. The Montrose family occupied the existing Buchanan Auld House and this eventually replaced Mugdock Castle as the seat of Clan Graham, being seen as a dwelling more fitting the title of marquess.

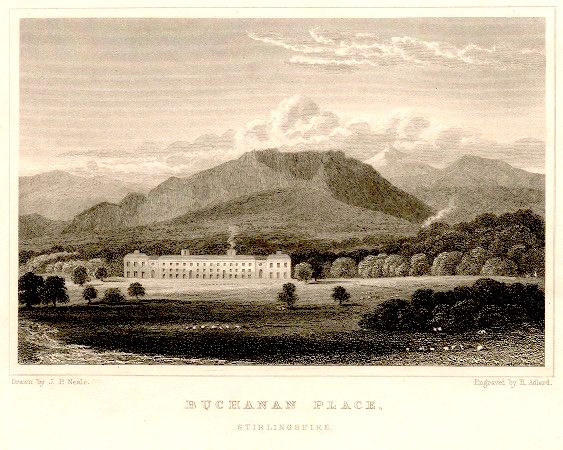
Buchanan Place, Stirlingshire, 1822

The original house was named Buchanan Place and substantially rebuilt from approximately 1724. It was altered in 1751 by John Adam and considerably enlarged in 1789 by William Playfair, giving it an extensively grand principal front near 300 feet in length similar to Petworth House, being described as a "venerable mansion" in which "many of the apartments are noble".

In December 1852, while the family were away for Christmas, the housekeeper was reputed to have drunk too much and awakened to find the entire house in flames. Many valuable items were lost in the blaze. Buchanan Auld House was destroyed in the fire and the 4th duke commissioned William Burn to design Buchanan Castle to replace it. Burn designed an extravagant manor in the Scottish baronial style, enclosing an L-plan tower in a clutch of turrets, bartizans and stepped gables. The new house was built in 1852-1858 and stands 0.5 miles (0.80 km) to the southeast of the old house.

The dukes remained at Buchanan until 1925, when it was sold. In the 1930s the house opened as a hotel and the golf course was established in the grounds. Plans for residential development on the estate were delayed by the outbreak of the Second World War, during which the house was requisitioned. It was used as a hospital during the war, with patients including Rudolf Hess, who was brought here after his flight to Scotland in 1941. After the war the building served briefly as the Army School of Education. The roof was removed from the house in 1954 to avoid paying tax on the property and outlying parts of the building were demolished. A number of residential buildings were subsequently built in the castle gardens and grounds.

Proposals were put forward for redevelopment of the house as flats in 2002 and 2004, though both applications were refused planning permission. The house is a category B listed building, and is included on the Buildings at Risk Register for Scotland. The grounds of the house were included on the Inventory of Gardens and Designed Landscapes, although they were removed from this listing in 2016. The walls of the house remain intact to their full height and are considered to be in good condition. The ruins are progressively engulfed by trees and plants, and surrounded by a perimeter fence.

== Gallery ==
Facade of the ruins of Buchanan Castle in 2012.

Northwest wing of the ruins of Buchanan Castle in 2012.
