= Adam Erskine =

Scottish landowner and courtier

Adam Erskine, Commendator of Cambuskenneth, was a Scottish landowner and courtier.

== Career ==
He was a son of Thomas Erskine, a younger son of John Erskine, 5th Lord Erskine. His mother's name is not known. His father's second wife was Margaret Fleming, later Countess of Atholl. Their marriage contract was dated 30 January 1549. They had no issue. Margaret was the daughter of Malcolm Fleming, 3rd Lord Fleming, and Janet Stewart, Lady Fleming, a "Natural Daughter" of James IV of Scotland.

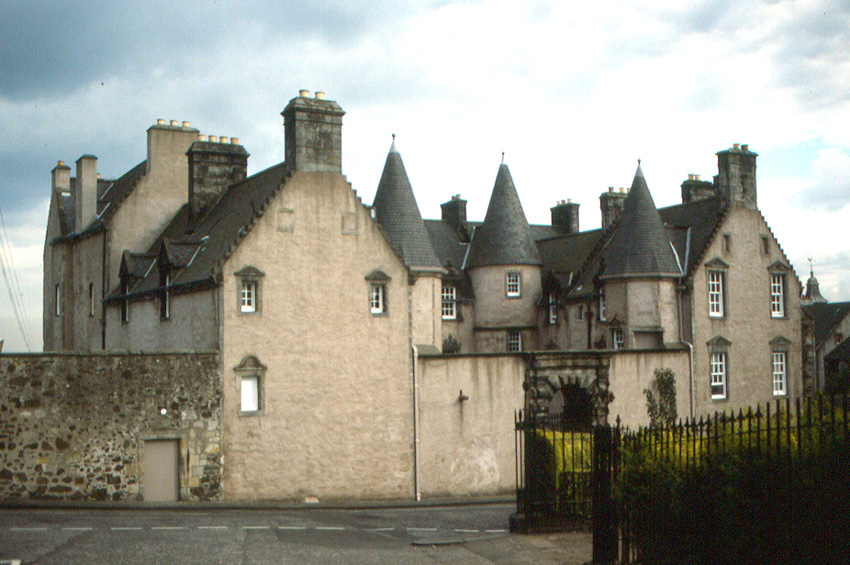
Adam Erskine's house in Stirling developed into Argyll's Lodging in Stirling

In 1559 he bought a house in Stirling near the castle now known as Argyll's Lodging from a merchant John Traill. Erskine converted the dwelling into an L-shaped tower house of four floors. In 1604 Erskine sold the house to a relative.

Adam Erskine was a supporter of Regent Morton during the minority of James VI of Scotland. He gave the young king, who lived at Stirling Castle with his aunt Annabell Murray, Countess of Mar, a hunting book, Jean de Clamorgan's, La Chasse du Loup (Paris, 1574).

=== A palace coup ===
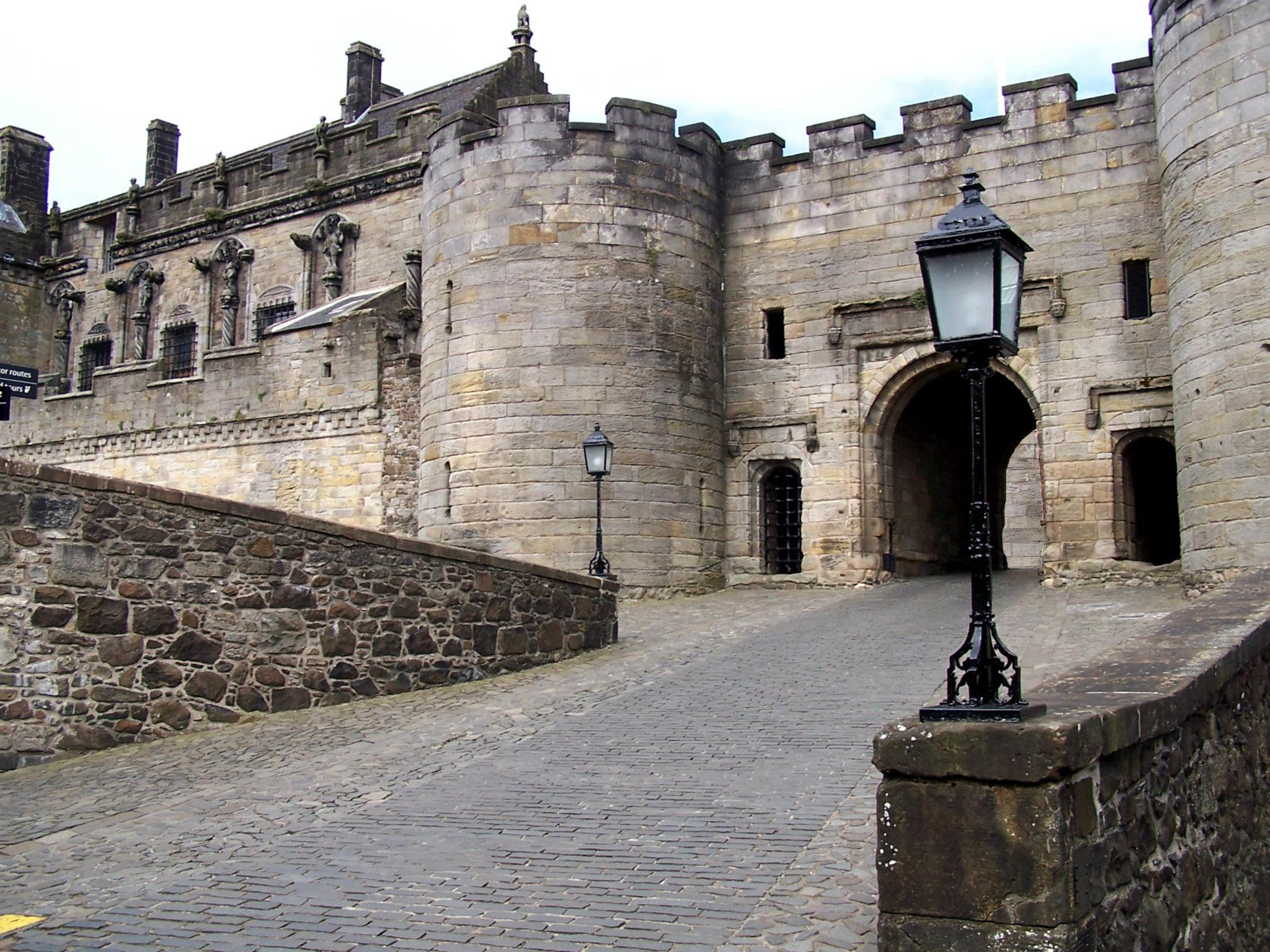
Adam Erskine was involved in a struggle at the gate of Stirling Castle on 27 April 1578

In April 1578 he ousted Alexander Erskine of Gogar from his post as keeper of Stirling Castle. The events were described by the English diplomat Robert Bowes. Adam Erskine had persuaded his cousin, Alexander's nephew, the young Earl of Mar that he should be the guardian of James VI. Adam Erskine and David Erskine, Commendator of Dryburgh, and the Earl of Mar, who were all lodged in Stirling Castle assembled at the castle gate early on Sunday morning, 27 April 1578, pretending to go out to join a hunt. The two Commendators met Alexander Erskine, who held the castle keys, and began to argue with him over the guardianship of the King.

Alexander Erskine seized a halberd and called his servants. There was a brief struggle, and then Alexander Erskine and the Commendators went into the Great Hall to discuss the matter. The Earl of Argyll was also present with his followers, and was prepared to fight, but eventually they decided to yield to the Earl of Mar. During the struggle at the castle gate, Gogar's eldest son was fatally injured and a servant called Buchanan was hurt. The young king was said to have torn his hair in distress during the incident, fearing that his friend Alexander Erskine was killed.

Adam Erskine wrote from Stirling Castle to John Erskine of Dun on 10 May 1579, asking him to come to Stirling for an inquest into the suspicious death of the Earl of Atholl.

=== Gowrie regime ===
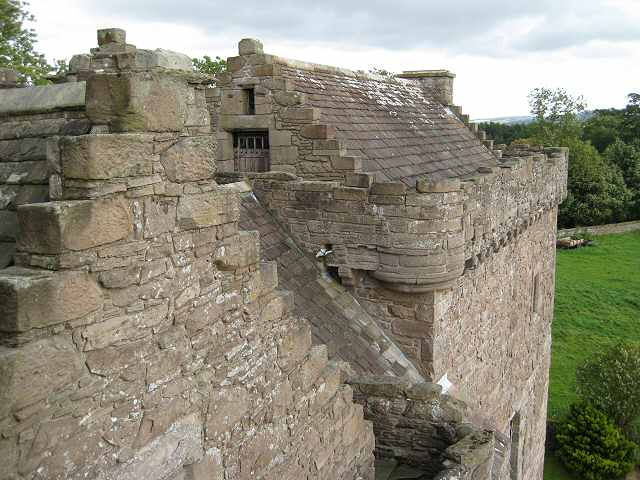
Ultra-Protestants seized James VI at Huntingtower

Erskine was an active supporter of the Gowrie Regime in 1583. James VI was captured by the Earl of Gowrie at Ruthven Castle, separated from his favourites, and coerced for several months into a pro-English and Reforming policy.

After the Gowrie Regime collapsed, Adam Erskine's properties were forfeited. A house in Stirling was given to the artillery man Archibald Gardiner, a gunner at Edinburgh Castle. This property was between the house of the Earl of Argyll and the house of the king's embroiderer, William Betoun. A pension from Cambuskenneth lands which he had given to one of his daughters was transferred to John Bog, the porter of Holyrood Palace.

Erskine was banished. In December 1583 he was at Berwick-upon-Tweed with Robert Colville of Cleish and they refused to accept terms of rehabilitation. Alexander Hay wrote to the Lady of Lochleven hoping she could help persuade them to accept the king's conditions. He was in Newcastle in February 1584 and intended to travel to London.

=== Collector of thirds ===
He soon returned to favour and was the Collector-General of the thirds of benefices. These were teinds or tithes, paid in cash or produce which were intended to contribute to the stipends of ministers of the church and the expenses of the royal household. A letter from August 1584 describes him pressing an agent of the Laird of Barnbarroch for payment.

He attended the coronation of Anne of Denmark on 17 May 1590. In January 1594 he joined the Privy Council. In May 1594, while the Earl of Mar was in Edinburgh, Adam Erskine, the Commendator of Dryburgh, and William Erskine, Bishop of Glasgow were appointed custodians of Prince Henry at Stirling.

The English diplomat George Nicholson came to Stirling Castle in June 1595 and spoke to the Earl of Argyll, Mar, his mother Annabell Murray, and Adam Erskine, who he called an Abbot.

Adam Erskine died some time before 1608.

== Marriage and children ==
Adam Erskine married Margaret Drummond, a daughter of Robert Drummond of Carnock and Agnes or Margaret Kirkcaldy, a sister of William Kirkcaldy of Grange. Their children included two daughters:

- Marie Erskine, who married James Erskine, a son of Alexander Erskine of Gogar and a younger brother of Thomas Erskine, 1st Earl of Kellie.
- Annabella Erskine, who married John Buchanan, and was the mother of the soldier George Buchanan.
