= William de Graham =

William de Graham was an Anglo-Norman who received the lands of Abercorn and Dalkeith during the reign of David I, King of Scotland. He is known to have witnessed many charters as early as about 1127–1128, and is the first Graham known in Scotland.
