= Clairinsh =

Island in Scotland

Clàr-Innis (Gaelic)
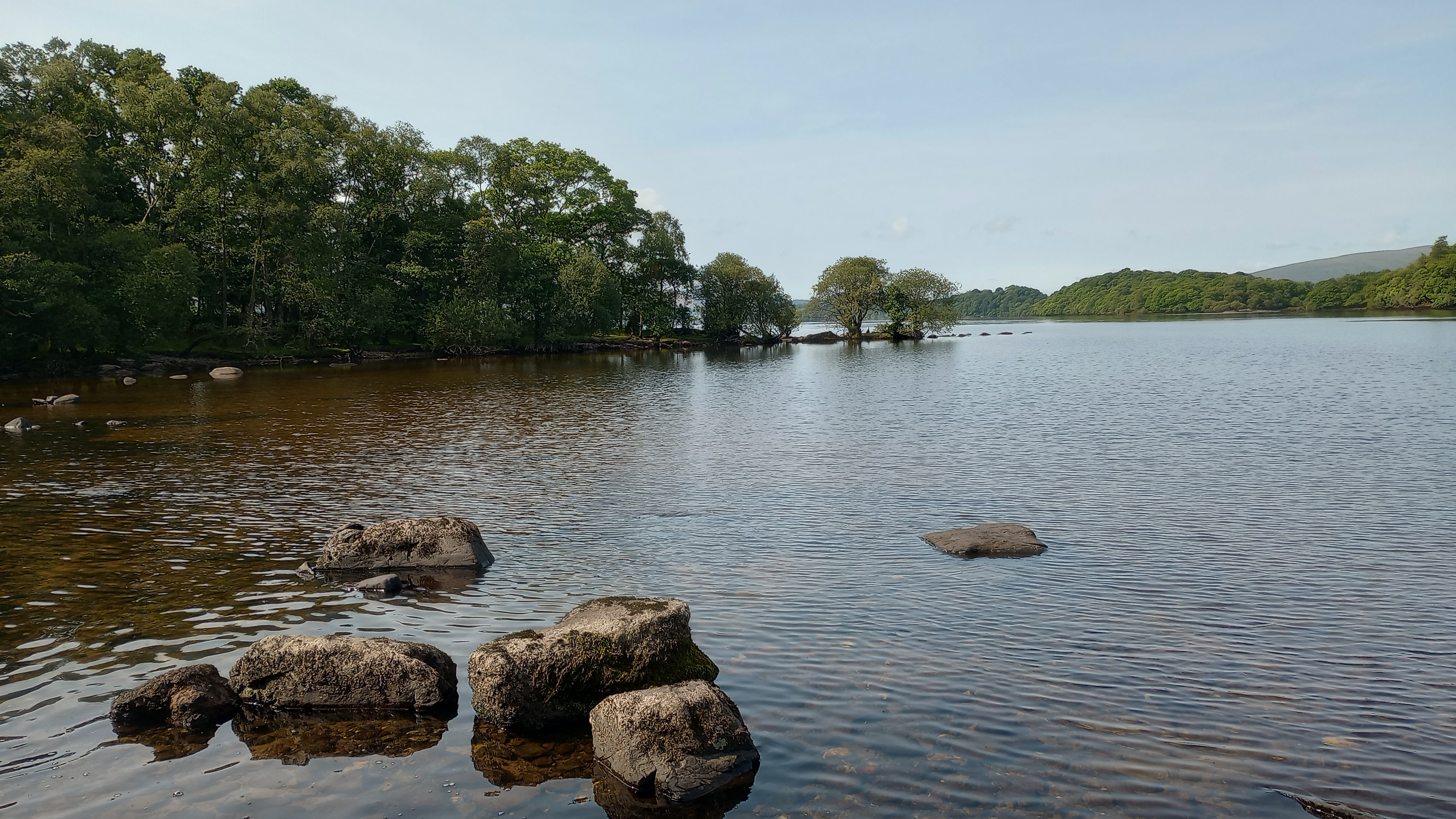
- The island in 2024

Location
- Location within Scotland
- OS grid reference: NS413898
- Coordinates: 56.08°N 4.57°W

Name
- Name meaning: flat island

Physical geography
- Island group: Loch Lomond
- Area: ha
- Highest elevation: 13 m (43 ft)

Administration
- Council area: Stirling
- Country: Scotland
- Sovereign state: United Kingdom

Demographics
- Population: 0

Clairinsh or Clairinch (Scottish Gaelic: Clàr-Innis) is an island in Loch Lomond, central Scotland.

The island lies just east of Inchcailloch, is approximately 1 km SW of Balmaha, and measures 450 m NE to SW by 200 m at its widest point. The island is flat: just 13 m at its highest point. (The word clàr refers to a flat surface, such as a board or table.) From above, the outline of the island bears a remarkable resemblance to a fish.

== History ==
=== Iron Age ===
On the island, the head of an iron ring-headed pin (a La Tène I (c) type) has been discovered. Roman pottery has been found in the remnants of a crannog (a man-made artificial island) 62 m off the northern end of Clairinch, called "Keppinch" (Scottish Gaelic: Ceap-Innis) or "The Kitchen". (The crannog is approximately 27 m in diameter, and has been surveyed but has yet to be archaeologically excavated.)

=== Medieval ===
In 1225, Maldonus, Third Mormaer of Lennox, granted a charter for Clairinch to Anselan of Buchanan (the seventh Laird of Buchanan), his seneschal, in return for a pound of wax yearly. This charter was confirmed by Alexander II of Scotland in 1231. There is archaeological evidence for no less than seven buildings and seven stone jetties on the island. Of note, both charters were signed on the island, the island was the clan seat for Clan Buchanan and Clan Buchanan adopted "Clàr-Innis!" as their slogan or battle cry, thus signifying that the island was of some importance in its own right. The crannog, noted above, may have served as the Council Island for Clan Buchanan.

=== Post-Medieval ===
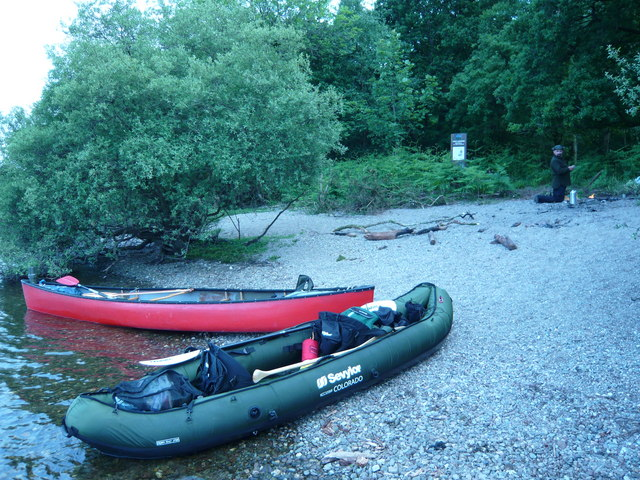
Canoes on Clairinsh

Clairinsh remained the property of the Clan Buchanan chief until it was acquired, in 1682, by the Third Duke of Montrose, and it remained the property of this family for the next two hundred and fifty years. In 1934, William George Buchanan (1865-1939) (who made his fortune in the Chilean nitrate industry) purchased the island. In his last will and testament, he bequeathed the island to the Buchanan Society on the condition that it be held in trust forever and that he wished the island to be used as an animal and bird sanctuary with no shooting allowed. From 1940, the island has been the property of the Buchanan Society. In 1958, Clairinsh was declared as the first part of a National Nature Reserve under an agreement with the landowner.
