= Anselan O Kyan =

Anselan O Kyan, who was a son of one of the kings of Ulster, landed on the northern coast of Argyll, near Lennox, about the year 1016. He assisted Malcolm II of Scotland in repelling his old enemies the Danes on two occasions. For his service to Malcolm, he received a grant of land in the north of Scotland, east of Loch Lomond. According to Buchanan of Auchmar, he is the founder of the Buchanan clan. The earliest source for the story of Anselan's life is an 18th-century book by William Buchanan, but the narrative explaining why he left Ulster for Scotland is generally regarded as an origin myth.

== See also ==
- McCausland
