= Cambusmore (Stirling) =

Country house in Stirling, Scotland

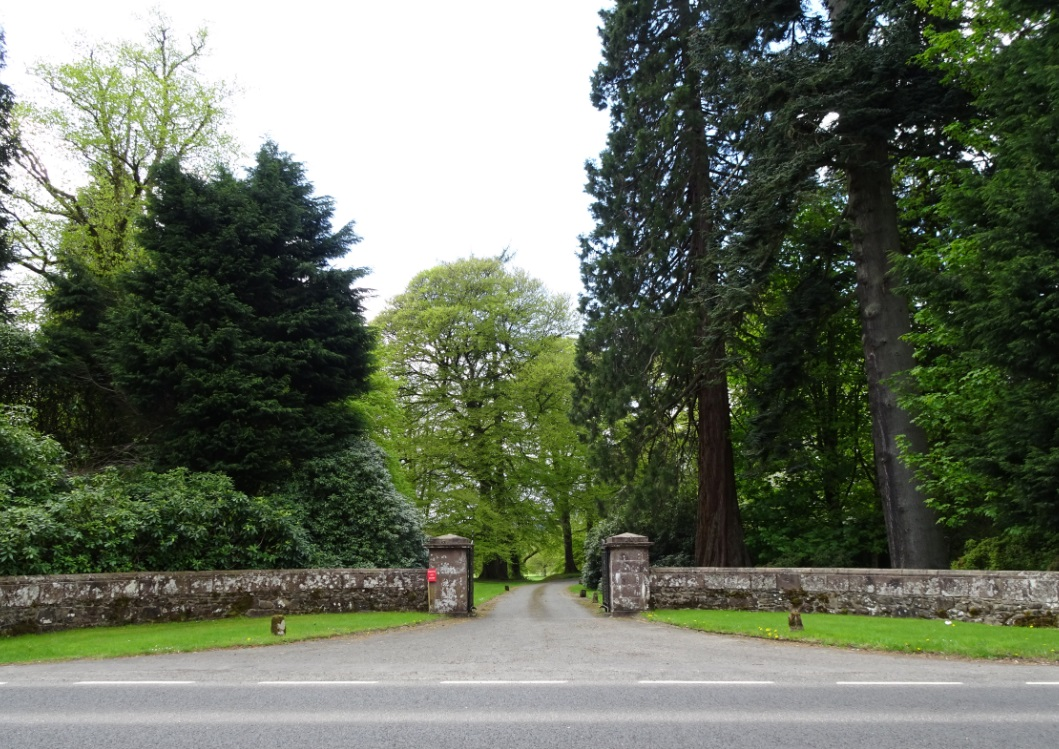
- The main entrance to Cambusmore

- Location in Stirling
- 56°13′45″N 04°10′40″W

Listed Building – Category C(S)
- Designated: 6 September 1979
- Reference no.: LB8240

Cambusmore is a country house in Stirling, Scotland, located 1 mile (1.6 km) southeast of the town of Callander. Situated on a tributary on the northern banks of the River Teith, it is located in an area which prior to 1975 formed part of the historic county of Perthshire. The main house is of Georgian style with a porte-cochère tower and later extensions.

Following recognition of John Michael Baillie-Hamilton Buchanan as the Chief of Clan Buchanan in 2018, Cambusmore became the current seat of the Clan.
