= George Buchanan (soldier) =

- Died: 1651
- Relatives: Sir John Buchanan (father), Anabella Buchanan (mother)
- Military career
- Allegiance: Scottish Army
- Conflicts: Bishop's War

Sir George Buchanan, 21st Laird of Buchanan (died 1651) was an officer in the Scottish army during the Wars of the Three Kingdoms, and also held a number of civil positions including a Commissioner to Parliament for Stirlingshire and member of the Committee of Estates.

== Biography ==
Sir George was the son of Sir John Buchanan and Anabella, daughter of Adam Erskine, commendator of Cambuskenneth, a son of the Master of Mar.

=== Bishops War ===
In 1641 Sir George commanded a Scottish company in the Scottish army commanded by Alexander Leslie that invaded England during the Bishop's War, and was a commissioner for the trial of "broken men" later the same year.

=== 1643–1648 ===
During the 1640s Sir George represented Stirlingshire on the Committee of Estates (1644), and as a Commissioner to Parliament from 1644 until 1646. He served on the Committee of War in the years 1643, 1644, 1646, 1648. He took on these positions while he still held a command in the army and in 1645 he was given leave from Parliament to return to his regiment in which there had been disaffection.

The Buchanan estates were pillaged by soldiers fighting for Montrose, and Sir George was active as a colonel of foot in Marquis of Argyll's campaign to defeat him. In 1647–1648 he refused to support the Engagement (an agreement made by a faction of the Covenanters to which he was not a member and Charles I who was by then a prisoner of the English Roundheads), so he did not participate in the disastrous Preston Campaign of that year.

=== 1649–1651 ===
With the trial and execution of Charles I, the political kaleidoscope of allegiances in Scotland changed. Sir George went from supporting the party that had opposed Charles I to that which supported Charles II, and as before he was active in both the civil and military arenas.

Sir George served on both the Committee of War and as a Commissioner for the revaluation of Stirlingshire in 1649, and from 1649 until 1651 served both as a Commissioner to Parliament, and on the Committee of Estates.

In 1650 Sir George was commissioned as a Colonel of horse (cavalry), and was, with his regiment, at the battle of Dunbar in 1650. He was also at the fatal Battle of Inverkeithing the following year, and with Major-General Sir John Brown of Fordell, Colonel of the Midlothian regiment, at the head of their regiments, stopped the passage of Cromwell's troops over the Firth of Forth, for some days. The Scots were, however, eventually defeated with great loss, and Sir George, with Sir John Brown and other officers, taken prisoner. He died while a prisoner of war towards the end of 1651.

== Family ==
Sir George married Elizabeth Preston, daughter of the Laird of Craigmillar and on his death he left one son, John Buchanan, Laird of Buchanan (d. 1682) and three daughters:

- John was the last Laird of Buchanan (Chief of Clan Buchanan), who was twice married, but had no male issue. By his second wife, Jean Pringle, daughter of Mr. Andrew Pringle, a minister, he had a daughter Janet, married to Henry Buchanan of Leny. After his death his estate was sold by his creditors, and purchased by the ancestor of the Duke of Montrose;
- Helen, married Sir John Rollo of Bannockburn;
- Agnes, married James Stewart of Rosyth;
- Jean, married John Leckie.
