= Duke of Montrose (ship) =

Several vessels have been named Duke of Montrose for one or another Duke of Montrose:

- Duke of Montrose (1785 EIC ship) was launched as an East Indiaman. She made eight voyages for the British East India Company (EIC). She then briefly became a troop transport, sailing to the West Indies. She was sold in 1811 for breaking up.
- Duke of Montrose (1804 ship) was a Falmouth packet launched in 1804. She participated in six single-ship actions. During the Napoleonic Wars she captured a French naval schooner but a year or so later a French privateer captured her. She returned to British hands some nine months later. During the War of 1812 she was able to drive off American privateers twice. An American frigate captured her in 1813 but gave her up to her crew, also putting onboard the crews of other vessels the frigate had captured. Then a French frigate captured her and gave her up after disarming her. She was wrecked at Barbados in 1815.
