= George Buchanan (surgeon) =

Scottish surgeon

- Born: 29 March 1827; Glasgow, Scotland
- Died: 19 April 1905 (aged 78); Stirling, Scotland
- Education: University of Glasgow; Andersonian University
- Medical career
- Profession: Surgeon, professor
- Institutions: Andersonian University; Glasgow Royal Infirmary; Western Infirmary

George Buchanan, LRCS (1827–1905) was a Scottish surgeon.

== Origins ==
George Buchanan, born at Glasgow on 29 March 1827, was son of Moses Steven Buchanan (1796 – 1860) and Agnes Leechman, his wife. The father, who was surgeon to the Royal Infirmary and lecturer on anatomy in the Portland Street Medical School from 1836 to 1841, was appointed in the latter year Professor of Anatomy in the Andersonian University.

== Education ==
George was educated at the University of Glasgow, where he graduated MA in 1846. Three years later, after studying under his father and others at the Andersonian University, he became MD St. Andrews and LRCS Edinburgh, and in 1852 Fellow of the Royal Faculty of Physicians and Surgeons of Glasgow. In early life he allowed the advantages of chloroform anaesthesia to be demonstrated upon himself, his father being the operator.

== Career ==
He began to practise in Glasgow, but in 1856 went to the Crimea as a civil surgeon. He returned to Glasgow at the end of the war, and was one of the first to practise there purely as a consulting surgeon. In 1860, when he succeeded his father as Professor of Anatomy in the Andersonian University, he was also appointed surgeon to the Glasgow Royal Infirmary. There he had as a colleague Joseph Lister (afterwards Lord Lister), who was led by the prevalence of septic diseases in the wards to the great work of his life the introduction of the antiseptic method of wound treatment.

Buchanan thus had the earliest opportunity of becoming acquainted with methods whereby the practice of surgery was revolutionised. He soon became known as a bold and skilful operator and as a good teacher. He first pointed out (1865 and 1867) the possibility and safety of removing half the tongue in cases of cancer. He was amongst the earlier surgeons to remove the upper jaw (1864 and 1869). He gave reasons for preferring lithotrity to lithotomy in operating for stone in the adult male (1868) and he was the first (1863) to perform ovariotomy successfully in the west of Scotland.

When the Western Infirmary was opened he was transferred thither, and held the post of Professor of Clinical Surgery from 1874 until 1900, when he retired with the title of Emeritus Professor of Clinical Surgery in the University of Glasgow and settled at Stirling. There he died on 19 April 1905.

== Family ==
He married Jessie, daughter of Patrick Blair of Irvine, and left one son, G. Burnside Buchanan, a medical doctor and assistant surgeon to the Western Infirmary, Glasgow.

== Publications ==
Buchanan published Camp Life as seen by a Civilian (Glasgow, 1871), and he re-edited and largely rewrote (Sir) Erasmus Wilson's Anatomist's Vade Mecum (London, 1873; 2nd edit. 1880).

== Sources ==
- "George Buchanan", The University of Glasgow Story. Accessed 1 March 2022.

Attribution:

- This article incorporates text from a publication now in the public domain: Power, D'Arcy (1912). "Buchanan, George". In Lee, Sidney (ed.). Dictionary of National Biography (2nd supplement). Vol. 1. London: Smith, Elder & Co. pp. 244–245.
