= Clan Graham =

Scottish clan

- Greumaich nan cearc (Highland Grahams only)
- Crest: A falcon Proper, beaked and armed Or, killing a stork Argent, Armed Gules
- Motto: Ne oublie (Do Not Forget)

Profile
- District: Loch Katrine, Perthshire, Dundee and Montrose
- Plant badge: Laurel
- Pipe music: Killiecrankie

Chief
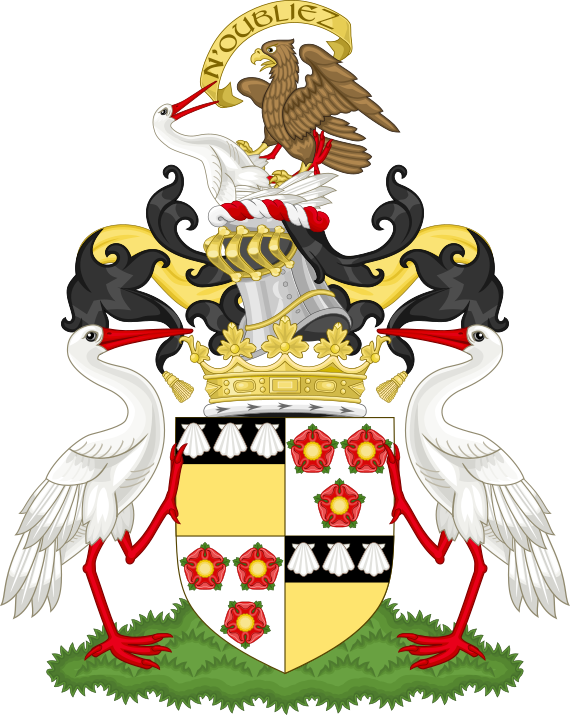
- The Most Noble James
- The 8th Duke of Montrose (An Greumach Mòr)
- Seat: Buchanan Castle
- Historic seat: Mugdock Castle
Septs of Clan Graham
Airth, Allardyce, Auchinloick, Ballewen, Blair, Bonar, Bonnar, Bonner, Bontein, Bontine, Buchanan, Buchlyrie, Buntain, Bunten, Bunting, Buntyn, Conyers, Drumaquhassle, Duchray, Dugalston, Esbank, Fintry, Glenny, Graeme, Grahame, Grim, Grimes, Hadden, Haldane, Hasty, Hastie, Howe, Kilpatrich, Lingo, Longstaff, MacGibbon, MacGilvern, MacGilvernock, MacIlvern, MacShille, Menteith, Monteith, Montrose, Monzie, Orchille, Pitcairn, Pyatt, Pye, Pyott, Rednock, Sirowan, Sterling.
Clan branches
Graham of Montrose (chiefs)
Graham of Menteith
Graham of Dundee
Graham of Erith
Graham of Netherby
See also:
Graham baronets
Allied clans
Clan Cameron
Clan Wallace
Clan Stewart
Rival clans
Clan Campbell
Clan MacGregor

Clan Graham (Greumaich nan Cearc [ˈkɾʲeːmɪç nəŋʲ ˈkʲaɾʃc]) has two main families of Scottish clans, the Grahams of Menteith (descended from the Earl Of Menteith) and the Grahams of Montrose (descended from the Duke of Montrose). Each have their own tartan patterns. William Graham became the 7th Earl of Menteith in 1610 in what is now Perthshire, Scotland. The Grahams of Montrose had territories in both the Scottish Highlands and Lowlands, and the chief of the clan rose to become the Marquess and later Duke of Montrose.

== History ==
=== Origins of the clan ===
There is a tradition that the first Graham was one Greme who broke the Roman Antonine Wall driving the Roman legions out of Scotland. However the likely origin is that the chiefs of Clan Graham were of Anglo-Norman origin. The Manor of Gregham is recorded in William the Conqueror's Domesday Book. When David I claimed the throne of Scotland, Graham was one of the knights who accompanied him. Sir William de Graham was present at the erection of Holyrood Abbey, witnessing its foundation charter.

The first lands that the chiefs of Clan Graham appear to have held were around Dalkeith in Midlothian. Sir Nicholas de Graham attended the Parliament of 1290 where the Treaty of Birgham was signed.

=== Wars of Scottish Independence ===
The Clan Graham fought at the Battle of Dunbar in 1296 where Sir Patrick de Graham of Kincardine was the only man of all the Scots not to retreat and instead fought to the death.

Sir John de Graham, was a friend and follower of William Wallace. Sir John de Graham is regarded as hero for rescuing Wallace at Queensbury. Sir John de Graham was regarded as Wallace's right-hand man and Wallace was at his side when Graham was killed in 1298 at the Battle of Falkirk. John de Graham's name is still perpetuated in the district of Grahamston. The grave of Sir John de Graham in Falkirk churchyard is still to be seen, with table stones of three successive periods above it. One great two-handed sword of Sir John the Graham is preserved at Buchanan Castle by the Duke of Montrose. Another was long in possession of the Grahams of Orchil and is now treasured by the Freemason Lodge at Auchterarder.

The Clan Graham also fought against the English at the Battle of Durham in 1346, in support of King David II of Scots. The Grahams acquired the lands of Mugdock north of Glasgow, where they built a stout castle around 1370.

In John Stewart's book, The Grahams, he states that "Most Scottish Clans would be proud to have one great hero. The Grahams have three." He refers to Sir John de Graham, the Marquis of Montrose and the Viscount of Dundee. Stewart also wrote,

It is remarkable that the early Grahams were one and all exceedingly capable men. In an age when the reputation of many great public figures, alas, that of most of the Scottish nobility, were sullied by deeds of violence, and often deeds of blackest treachery, it is refreshing to find that the Grahams stand out as loyal and true to the causes they espoused. Their story is not one of rapid rise to power through royal favor, or even at the expense of their peers, but rather a gradual steady rise based on their undoubted ability and worthiness which seems to have endured from one generation to another.

=== 15th and 16th centuries ===
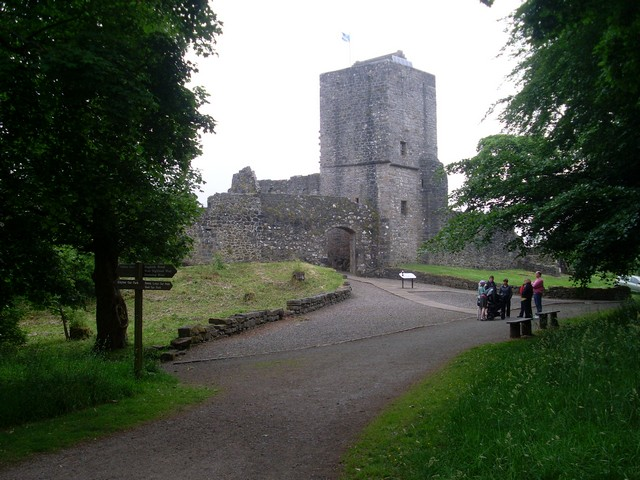
Mugdock Castle was the clan's stronghold

The Clan Graham fought at the Battle of Sauchieburn led by the third Lord Graham. The battle was fought on 11 June 1488, at the side of Sauchie Burn, a brook about two miles south of Stirling, Scotland. In 1504 Lord Graham, on account of his gallantry was made Earl of Montrose. He would go on to lead part of the Scottish Vanguard against the English at the Battle of Flodden in 1513, part of the Anglo-Scottish Wars where he was slain. The Clan Graham was among the clans which fought against the English at the Battle of Pinkie Cleugh 1547, where Robert, the eldest son of the second Earl, was killed.

=== 17th century and Civil War ===
==== James Graham, 1st Marquis of Montrose ====
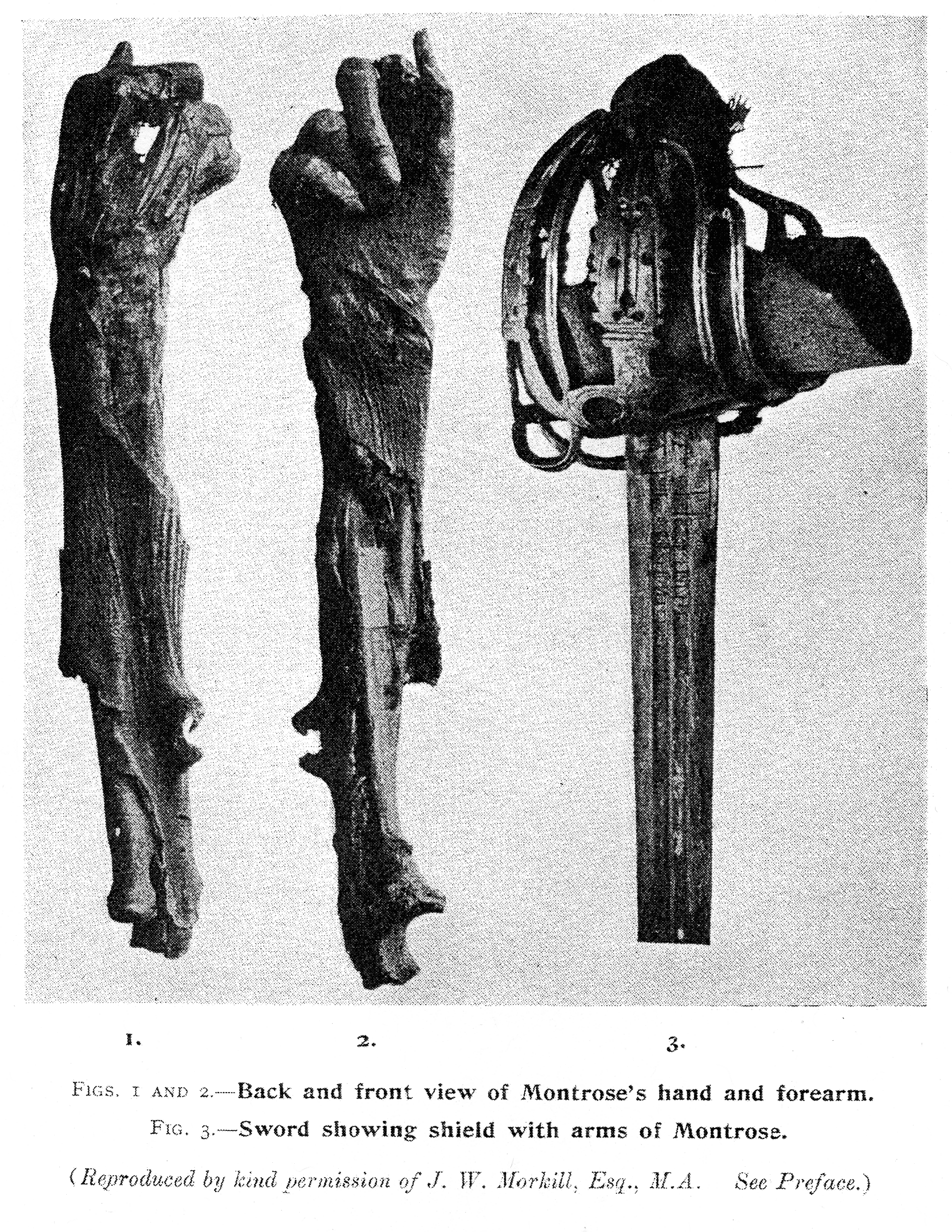
A souvenir of Montrose's hanging: His right arm (seen front and back) and sword. The arm was nailed at the gate of Dundee, later was carried off to England, and was never buried with his remains.

One of the most notable chiefs of the Clan Graham was James, Marquis of Montrose, a poet, but above all, the most distinguished royalist soldier of his time. He played a massive part in the Civil War in Scotland and the Grahams rallied to their chief. Montrose had had successive victories at the Battle of Tippermuir – with the support of Alaster M'Coll Keitach (known as Alasdair MacColla McDonald) and his Irish soldiers, the Battle of Aberdeen, the Battle of Inverlochy (1645), the Battle of Auldearn, the Battle of Alford, and the Battle of Kilsyth. After several years of continuous victories, Montrose was finally defeated at the Battle of Philiphaugh on 13 September 1645 by the Covenanter army of David Leslie, Lord Newark, restoring the power of the Committee of Estates.

In 1646 Montrose laid siege to Chanonry Castle which was held by the Clan Mackenzie and took it from them after a siege of four days. In March 1650 he captured Dunbeath Castle of the Clan Sinclair, who would later support him at Carbisdale. Montrose was defeated at the Battle of Carbisdale by the Munros, Rosses, Sutherlands and Colonel Alexander Strachan. He was subsequently captured and executed in Edinburgh in 1650.

==== John Graham, Viscount of Dundee ====
Another notable Graham was John, Viscount of Dundee also known as "Bonnie Dundee". By means of purchase and inheritance the Graham lands had become, by the late seventeenth century, among the richest in Scotland.

The Viscount of Dundee led a small Government Troop of Cavalry which was surprised and defeated at the Battle of Drumclog in 1679 by an overwhelming force of rebel Covenanters (estimates suggest Graham was outnumbered by about 4–1). However he was victorious at the Battle of Bothwell Brig where he put down a rebellion by the Covenanters. The battle was fought on 22 June 1679 in Lanarkshire.

Dundee was appointed Commander in Chief of all Scottish Forces by King James VII but died at the Battle of Killiecrankie whilst commanding the Jacobite Forces during their victory over a much larger Williamite Army in 1689.

=== 18th century and Jacobite uprisings ===
The Clan Graham took no side in the Jacobite Uprisings and remained neutral throughout. Highlanders can thank James Graham, 3rd Duke of Montrose for the repeal in 1782 of the Dress Act 1746 prohibiting the wearing of highland dress. He persuaded Parliament to remove the law forbidding Scots to wear their tartan.

== Castles ==
- Mugdock Castle was the seat of the chiefs of the Clan Graham Dukes of Montrose. It was held by the Grahams from the middle of the 13th century.
- Buchanan Castle in Stirlingshire is the current seat of the chief of Clan Graham.
- Claypotts Castle was held by the Grahams of Claverhouse.
- Dalkeith Palace was held by the Grahams from the 12th century but passed to the Clan Douglas in about 1350.
- Mains Castle (also known as Fintry Castle) was originally held by the Clan Stewart but it passed to the Grahams in 1350 and it was the Grahams who built the current castle. The castle was sold to the Clan Erskine in the 19th century and then to the Cairds. It was later given to the people of Dundee and today the grounds are a public park.
- Inchtalla Castle was the seat of the Grahams who were Earls of Menteith.
- Kincardine Castle, Auchterarder was a substantial castle that was held by the Grahams from about 1250. However the castle was demolished by Campbell Earl of Argyll in 1646.
- Sir John de Graham Castle, also known as Graham's Castle, or Dundaff Castle, was said to be the birthplace of the legendary Sir John de Graham, who fought at the Battle of Stirling Bridge in 1297.

== Tartan ==
Tartan image	Notes
	Graeme tartan, as published in 1842 in Vestiarium Scoticum. There are two main families of Graham clan tartans, the Graham of Montrose tartans and the Graham of Menteith tartans.

== Chief ==
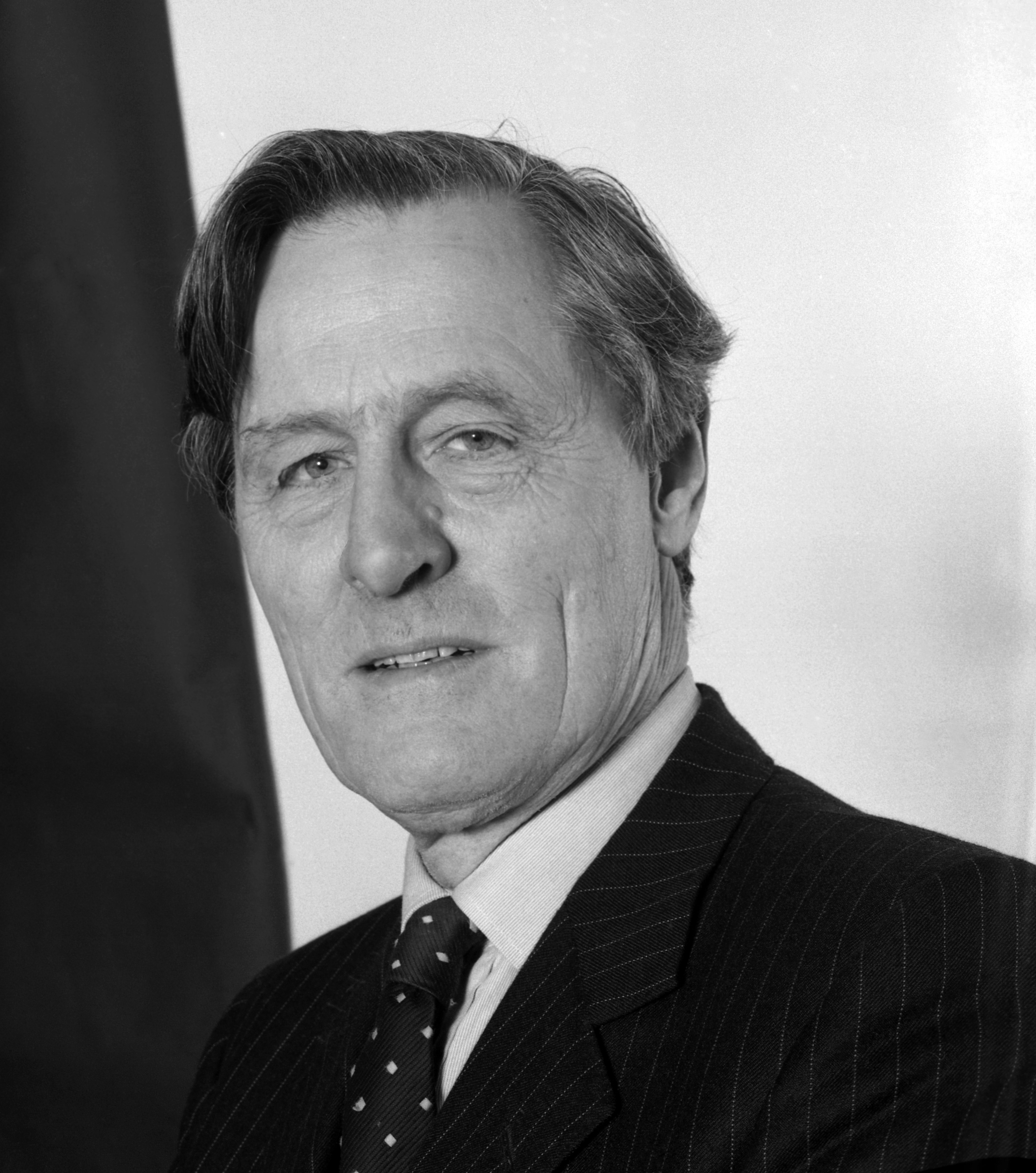
James, Duke of Montrose

Since 1992, the chief of the family has been James, Duke of Montrose, Marquis of Graham and Buchanan, Earl of Kincardine, Viscount of Dundaff, Lord of Mugdock, Aberuthven and Fintrie, Baronet of Braco.

== See also ==
- Graham (surname), for a list of notable people with the Graham surname
- Graham, for a list of Graham places
- Scottish clan, for a list of other Scottish clans
- The First City Regiment (Grahamstown, South Africa) wears the Graham of Montrose tartan and badge.
