= Duke of Montrose =

Dukedom in the Peerage of Scotland

Dukedom of Montrose
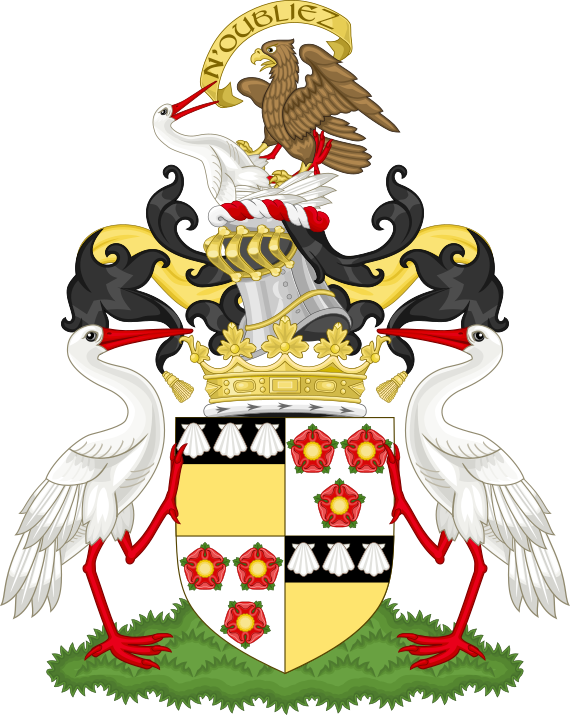
- Arms: Quarterly, 1st and 4th: Or on a Chief Sable three Escallops Or (Graham); 2nd and 3rd: Argent three Roses Gules barbed and seeded proper (Montrose). Crest: An Eagle wings hovering Or preying on a Stork on its back proper, Alias: A Falcon proper, beaked and armed or, killing a stork argent, armed gules. Supporters: On either side a Stork Argent beaked and membered Gules.
- Creation date: 1707
- Creation: Second
- Created by: Anne I
- Peerage: Peerage of Scotland
- First holder: James Graham, 4th Marquess of Montrose
- Present holder: James Graham, 8th Duke
- Heir apparent: James Graham, Marquess of Graham
- Remainder to: The 1st Duke's heirs male of the body lawfully begotten, heirs female, and heirs of nomination
- Subsidiary titles: Marquess of Montrose; Marquess of Graham and Buchanan; Earl of Montrose; Earl of Kincardine; Earl Graham; Viscount Dundaff; Lord Graham; Lord Graham and Mugdock; Lord Aberruthven, Mugdock and Fintrie; Baron Graham, of Belford
- Seat: Auchmar House
- Former seat: Buchanan Castle
- Motto: N'oubliez ("Forget not")

Duke of Montrose (named for Montrose, Angus) is a title that has been created twice in the Peerage of Scotland. The title was created anew in 1707, for James Graham, 4th Marquess of Montrose, great-grandson of famed James Graham, 1st Marquess of Montrose. Montrose was elevated as a reward for his important support of the Act of Union. It has remained since then in the Graham family, tied to the chieftainship of Clan Graham.

== Subsidiary titles ==
The Duke's subsidiary titles are: Marquess of Montrose (created 1644), Marquess of Graham and Buchanan (1707), Earl of Montrose (1503), Earl of Kincardine (1644), Earl Graham (1722), Viscount Dundaff (1707), Lord Graham (1445), Lord Graham and Mugdock (1644), Lord Aberruthven, Mugdock and Fintrie (1707) and Baron Graham, of Belford (1722). The titles of Earl Graham and Baron Graham are in the Peerage of Great Britain; the rest are in the Peerage of Scotland. The eldest son of the Duke uses the courtesy title of Marquess of Graham and Buchanan.

== List of titleholders ==
=== Lords Graham (1445) ===
- Patrick Graham, 1st Lord Graham (d. c. 1466)
- William Graham, 2nd Lord Graham (d. 1472), eldest son of the 1st Lord
- William Graham, 3rd Lord Graham (1464–1513), became Earl of Montrose in 1503; a great-grandson of Robert III

=== Dukes of Montrose, first creation (1488) ===
Other titles: Earl of Crawford (1398), Lord Brechin and Navar (1472 for life)

- David Lindsay, 1st Duke of Montrose (1440–1495), son of the 4th Earl of Crawford, was a loyal follower of James III; his dukedom was forfeit when James IV acceded in 1488, but it was restored to him for life in 1489

=== Earls of Montrose (1503) ===
Other titles: Lord Graham (1445)

- William Graham, 1st Earl of Montrose (1464–1513), eldest son of the 2nd Lord Graham
- William Graham, 2nd Earl of Montrose (1492–1571), eldest son of the 1st Earl
  - Robert Graham, Master of Montrose (d. 1547), eldest son of the 2nd Earl, predeceased his father
- John Graham, 3rd Earl of Montrose (1548–1608), son of the Master of Montrose
- John Graham, 4th Earl of Montrose (1573–1626), eldest son of the 3rd Earl
- James Graham, 5th Earl of Montrose (1612–1650), became Marquess of Montrose in 1644

=== Marquesses of Montrose (1644) ===
Other titles: Earl of Montrose (1503), Earl of Kincardine (1644), Lord Graham (1445) and Lord Graham and Mugdock (1644)

- James Graham, 1st Marquess of Montrose (1612–1650), only son of the 4th Earl
  - John Graham, Earl of Kincardine (1630–1645), eldest son of the 1st Marquess, predeceased his father unmarried
- James Graham, 2nd Marquess of Montrose (1633–1669), second son of the 1st Marquess
- James Graham, 3rd Marquess of Montrose (1657–1684), only son of the 2nd Marquess
- James Graham, 4th Marquess of Montrose (1682–1742), became Duke of Montrose in 1707
  - James Graham, Earl of Kincardine (1703), eldest son of the 4th Marquess, died in infancy

=== Dukes of Montrose, second creation (1707) ===
Other titles: Marquess of Montrose (1644), Marquess of Graham and Buchanan (1707), Earl of Montrose (1503), Earl of Kincardine (1644), Earl of Kincardine (1707), Viscount Dundaff (1707), Lord Graham (1445), Lord Graham and Mugdock (1644) and Lord Aberruthven, Mugdock and Fintrie (1707)

- James Graham, 1st Duke of Montrose (1682–1742), only son of the 3rd Marquess

Other titles (Lord Graham & 2nd Duke onwards): Earl Graham and Baron Graham (1722)
- David Graham, Marquess of Graham (1705–1731), second son of the 1st Duke, predeceased his father without issue

- William Graham, 2nd Duke of Montrose (1712–1790), seventh son of the 1st Duke
- James Graham, 3rd Duke of Montrose (1755–1836), only son of the 2nd Duke
  - James Graham, Earl of Kincardine (1786–1787), eldest son of the 3rd Duke (then Lord Graham), died in infancy
- James Graham, 4th Duke of Montrose (1799–1874), second son of the 3rd Duke
  - James Graham, Marquess of Graham (1845–1846), eldest son of the 4th Duke, died in infancy
  - James Graham, Marquess of Graham (1847–1872), second son of the 4th Duke, died without issue
- Douglas Beresford Malise Ronald Graham, 5th Duke of Montrose (1852–1925), third and youngest son of the 4th Duke
- James Graham, 6th Duke of Montrose (1878–1954), eldest son of the 5th Duke
- James Angus Graham, 7th Duke of Montrose (1907–1992), elder son of the 6th Duke
- James Graham, 8th Duke of Montrose (b. 1935), eldest son of the 7th Duke
  - James Graham, Marquess of Graham (born 16 August 1973), heir-apparent

== Estates and residences ==
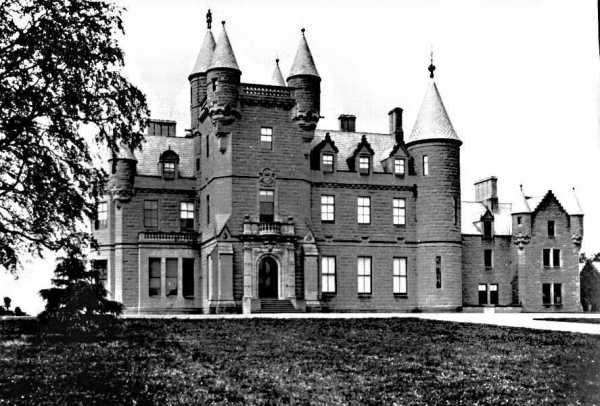
Buchanan Castle in the late 1890s

=== Country seats ===
==== Buchanan Castle, Stirlingshire ====
The seat of the Earls and Dukes of Montrose was historically Buchanan Auld House near Drymen, Stirlingshire. The house burned down in 1852, after which James Graham, 4th Duke of Montrose oversaw the construction of Buchanan Castle on the former site of Buchanan Auld House.

Following its completion in 1858 Buchanan Castle remained as the seat of the Dukes of Montrose until 1932, when James Graham, 6th Duke of Montrose vacated the house owing to the financial burden of death duties levied on his estates following the death of the 5th Duke in 1925. After failing to find a buyer for the Castle, the house was converted into a hotel which opened in April 1933. The Duke again tried to sell the castle for £25,000 in 1949, but no buyer could be found.

==== Auchmar House ====
In 1932 the 6th Duke of Montrose commissioned the construction of a smaller contemporary residence on the Buchanan Castle estate, which was named Auchmar House. The house, which sits on the banks of Loch Lomond, has served as the country seat of the Dukes of Montrose since Buchanan Castle was vacated as a private residence.

==== Brodick Castle, Arran and Easton Park, Suffolk ====
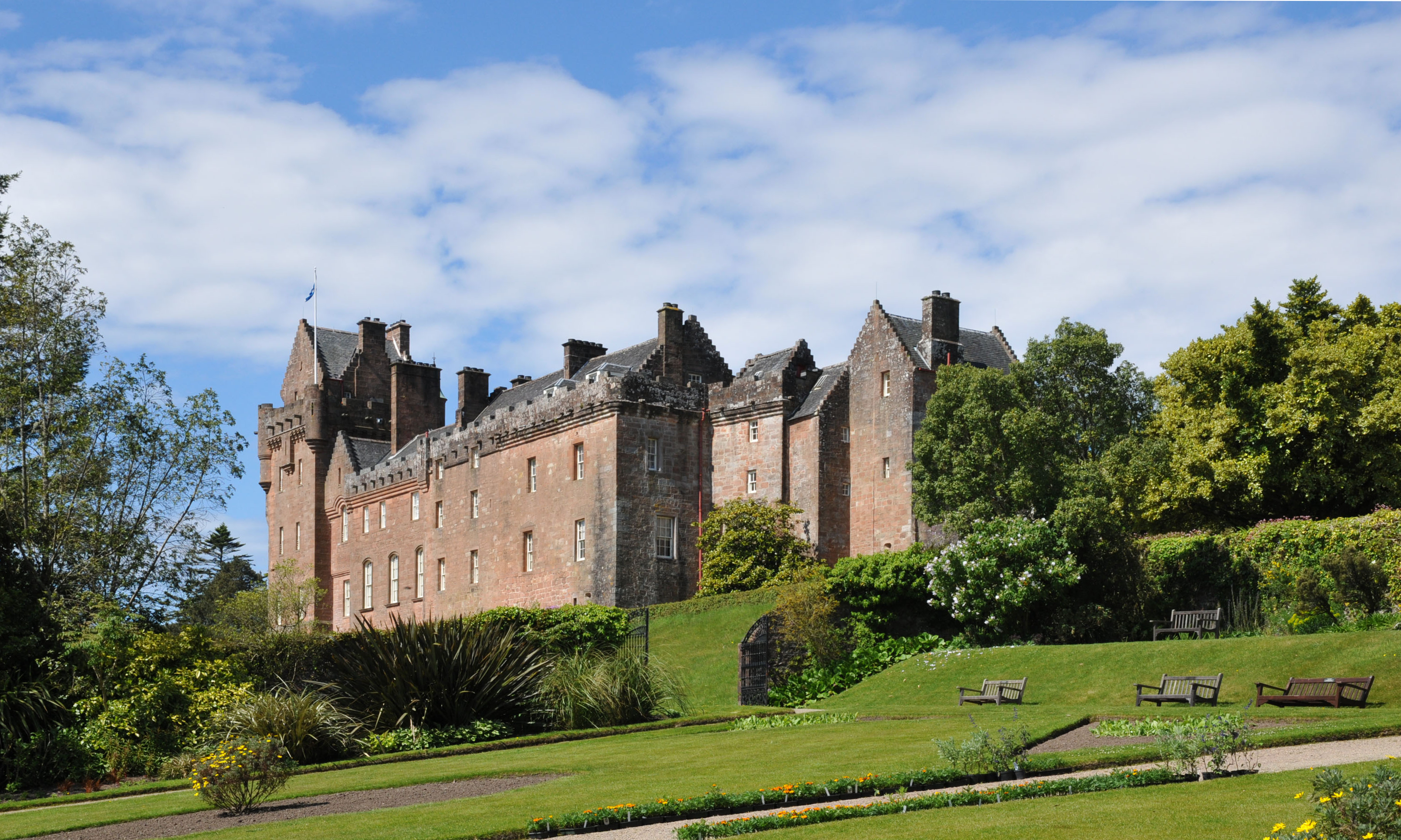
Brodick Castle, Isle of Arran

Through the marriage of the 6th Duke to Lady Mary Hamilton, only child of William Douglas-Hamilton, 12th Duke of Hamilton in 1906, the family came into possession of Brodick Castle on the Isle of Arran and Easton Park, Suffolk in 1895. The combined valuation of the 4,900-acre Easton Park estate and 102,000-acre Isle of Arran estates centred on Brodick Castle was £374,713 for probate purposes in 1895.

Easton Park served primarily as the residence of Lady Mary's mother, the Dowager Duchess of Hamilton, during the early 20th century, and was later used as a hospital during the First World War. The estate surrounding the house was sold for £58,000 in 1919, and the house was sold in 1922 for £11,200.

Following the death of Mary, Dowager Duchess of Montrose in 1957, her daughter Lady Jean Fforde transferred Brodick Castle to the National Trust in 1958 in lieu of death duties on her mother's estate.

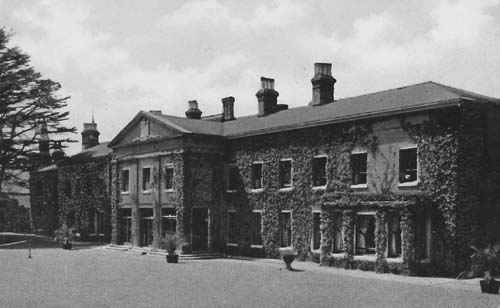
Easton Park in 1909

=== Landholdings ===
In the 1883 edition of John Bateman's The Great Landowners of Great Britain and Ireland, Douglas Graham, 5th Duke of Montrose's estates were recorded as spanning 103,447 acres across Scotland, including 68,565 acres in Stirlingshire, 32,294 acres in Perthshire, and 2,588 acres in Dunbartonshire, which produced a combined annual income of £24,892.

=== London residences ===
In 1818 James Graham, 1st Duke of Montrose purchased No. 20 Hanover Square, Mayfair, where he took up residence in 1820. He spent £2,800 on the purchase, and a further £1,700 furnishing the house, which remained as his London residence until 1735, when he sold it to Richard Temple, 1st Viscount Cobham.

William Graham, 2nd Duke of Montrose leased No. 41 Upper Grosvenor Street as his London residence from 1743 until his death in 1790.

His son James Graham, 3rd Duke of Montrose leased No. 25 Grosvenor Square as his London house from 1786 until his death in 1836. His widow Caroline Graham, Duchess of Montrose lived at Montrose House, Petersham from 1837 until 1847; the existing house derives its name from her period of occupancy.

James Graham, 4th Duke of Montrose leased No. 45 Belgrave Square from c. 1839; following his death in 1874, his wife Caroline Graham, Dowager Duchess of Montrose continued to live at the house until she died in 1894.

Their son Douglas Graham, 5th Duke of Montrose leased No. 41 Eaton Square from c. 1879 until 1883. He later leased No. 27 Pont Street as his London house from c. 1895 until 1904.

His eldest son and heir James Graham, Marquess of Graham married the heiress Lady Mary Hamilton in 1906; the couple did not maintain a permanent London residence, instead leasing a series of houses for the London season, including No. 19 Manchester Square in 1907, No. 105 Cadogan Gardens in 1911, and No. 1 Upper Belgrave Street in 1927. Following the death of the 5th Duke in 1925, his widow Violet Graham, Dowager Duchess of Montrose took a lease of No. 19 Lowndes Square, Belgravia in 1926, where she continued to live until c. 1931.

== Family ==
residence at tree and succession

Lords Graham, Earl of Kincardine (1644 creation), Earls of Montrose, Marquesses of Montrose, and Dukes of Montrose family tree

Lord Graham, 1445
Patrick Graham d. c. 1466; 1st Lord Graham
Lord Brechin and Navar, 1472; Duke of Montrose (1st creation), 1488
David Lindsay; 1440–1495; 1st Duke of Montrose, etc., 4th Earl of Crawford	William Graham d. 1472; 2nd Lord Graham
Dukedom forfeit, 1488; Dukedom restored, 1489; Dukedom extinct, 1495
Earl of Montrose, 1503
William Graham; 1464–1513; 1st Earl of Montrose, 3rd Lord Graham
William Graham; 1492–1571; 2nd Earl of Montrose, 4th Lord Graham
Robert Graham d. 1547 styled Master of Montrose
John Graham; 1548–1608; 3rd Earl of Montrose, 5th Lord Graham
John Graham; 1573–1626; 4th Earl of Montrose, 6th Lord Graham
Marquess of Montrose, Earl of Kincardine, and Lord Graham and Mugdock, 1644
James Graham; 1612–1650; 1st Marquess of Montrose, etc., 5th Earl of Montrose, 7th Lord Graham	See also: Earls of Kincardine family tree for the 1647 creation
John Graham; 1630–1645 styled Earl of Kincardine	James Graham; 1633–1669; 2nd Marquess of Montrose, etc., 6th Earl of Montrose, 8th Lord Graham
James Graham; 1657–1684; 3rd Marquess of Montrose, etc., 7th Earl of Montrose, 9th Lord Graham
Duke of Montrose (2nd creation), Marquess of Graham and Buchanan, Earl of Kincardine, Viscount Dundaff, and Lord Aberuthven, Mugdock and Fintrie, 1707; Earl Graham and Baron Graham of Belford in the County of Northumberland, 1722
James Graham; 1682–1742; 1st Duke of Montrose, etc., 4th Marquess of Montrose, etc., 8th Earl of Montrose, 10th Lord Graham
James Graham; 1703–1704 styled Earl of Kincardine	David Graham; 1705–1731	William Graham; 1712–1790; 2nd Duke of Montrose, etc., 5th Marquess of Montrose, etc., 9th Earl of Montrose, 11th Lord Graham	George Graham; 1715–1747
James Graham; 1755–1836; 3rd Duke of Montrose, etc., 6th Marquess of Montrose, etc., 10th Earl of Montrose, 12th Lord Graham
James Graham; 1786–1787 styled Earl of Kincardine	Georgiana Finch-Hatton; 1791–1835; Countess of Winchilsea	James Graham; 1799–1874; 4th Duke of Montrose, etc., 7th Marquess of Montrose, etc., 11th Earl of Montrose, 13th Lord Graham	Lucy Herbert; 1793–1875; Countess of Powis
James Graham; 1845–1846 styled Marquess of Graham	James Graham; 1847–1872 styled Marquess of Graham	Douglas Graham; 1852–1925; 5th Duke of Montrose, etc., 8th Marquess of Montrose, etc., 12th Earl of Montrose, 14th Lord Graham
James Graham; 1878–1954; 6th Duke of Montrose, etc., 9th Marquess of Montrose, etc., 13th Earl of Montrose, 15th Lord Graham	2 younger daughters and 2 younger sons
James Angus Graham; 1907–1992; 7th Duke of Montrose, etc., 10th Marquess of Montrose, etc., 14th Earl of Montrose, 16th Lord Graham	Jean Fforde; 1920–2017
Fiona Mary Graham; 1932–2017	James Graham b. 1935; 8th Duke of Montrose, etc., 11th Marquess of Montrose, etc., 15th Earl of Montrose, 17th Lord Graham
Hermione Elizabeth Graham b. 1971	James Graham b. 1973 styled Marquess of Graham	Ronald John Christopher Graham b. 1975
Heir apparent to the Dukedom of Montrose
John Graham Thornhill b. 1998	Grace Graham Thornhill b. 1998	2 sons

Line of succession (simplified)
- Douglas Graham, 5th Duke of Montrose (1852–1925)
  - James Graham, 6th Duke of Montrose (1878–1954)
    - (James) Angus Graham, 7th Duke of Montrose (1907–1992)
      - James Graham, 8th Duke of Montrose (born 1935)
        - (1). James Alexander Norman Graham, Marquess of Graham (born 1973)
        - (2). Lord Ronald John Christopher Graham (born 1975)
          - (3). Elder son (born after 2016)
          - (4). Younger son (born after 2016)
      - (5). Lord Donald Alasdair Graham (born 1956)
        - (6). Finlay Donald Cameron Graham (born 1998)
      - (7). Lord Calum Ian Graham (born 1958)
        - (8). Iain Angus Graham (born 1995)
        - (9). Euan Douglas Graham (born 1996)
  - Brigadier Lord Douglas Malise Graham (1883–1974)
    - Ivar Malise Graham (1920–2016)
      - male issue in remainder

== See also ==
- Montrose Mausoleum
- Buchanan Auld House
- Duke of Montrose – one of several vessels by that name
