= List of castles in Stirling (council area) =

This is a list of castles in the Stirling council area of Scotland.

== List ==
Name	Type	Date	Condition	Ownership	Location	Notes	Picture
Airthrey Castle	Baronial house	1790s	Occupied	Stirling University	Stirling; NS812967	University campus established in the grounds in the 1960s	
Ballikinrain Castle	Baronial house	1868	Occupied	Church of Scotland	Killearn; NS563872	Independent residential school	
Buchanan Castle	Baronial house	1854	Ruin		Drymen; NS461886	De-roofed in the 1950s	
Craigend Castle	Baronial house		Ruin		Mugdock Country Park		
Culcreuch Castle	Tower house	1296	Occupied	Private	Fintry; NS620786	In use as a hotel	
Dalnair Castle	Baronial house	1884	Occupied	Private	Stirling	In use as apartments	
Doune Castle	Courtyard castle	14th century	Preserved	Historic Scotland	Doune; NN7284701062	Open to the public	
Edinample Castle	Tower house	16th century	Occupied as a residence	Private	Balquhidder; NN601226	Restored in the 1980s	
Mugdock Castle	Courtyard castle	14th century	Ruin	Stirling Council	Mugdock Country Park; NS5501077167		
Plean Castle	Tower house		Restored	Private	Plean	Also known as Plane castle, Menzies Castle, etc.	
Rusky Castle	Bastle		Submerged		Loch Rusky NN 6144 0338		
Stirling Castle				Historic Scotland	Stirling; NS789940		

== See also ==
- Castles in Scotland
- List of castles in Scotland
- List of listed buildings in Stirling
