= Cunningham of Drumquhassle =

The coat of arms of Andrew Cunningham of Drumquhassle c 1512

The Cunninghams of Drumquhassle were a family of the landed gentry in Scotland from the early 16th century to the mid-17th. They are linked to the Cunninghams of Kilmaurs in Ayrshire, being descended through junior lines via the Cunninghams of Polmaise. At their greatest extent, their lands included Mugdock-Mitchell and the house at Killermont (in modern-day Bearsden), covering the part of parishes of Strathblane and New Kilpatrick. John Cunningham, the third laird held several positions of responsibility within the Scottish court, including Master of the Royal Household for James VI and a Collector General of tax during the regency of the Earl of Lennox, but his involvement in the power struggles between the Scottish nobility and the court of Elizabeth I also led to his demise and he was executed for treason in 1585. Over the next century, the family lost its land and power – in the mid-17th century, the Cunninghams sold their country house in Drumquhassle in rural Stirlingshire and it passed to the Govane family.

== Lineage ==
The Cunninghams of Drumquhassle (alternative spellings include Drumwhassle and Drumquhassill, meaning ridge with the castle (a Roman fort was built there) ) were descended from one of the younger sons of Sir Robert Cunningham of Kilmaurs, and then through one of the younger sons of Andrew Cunningham^{(Note: Andrew Cunningham is described as "of Drumqhuassle" by an act of Parliament of 1483; it is possible that this was an alternative style for Cunningham of Polmaise, or that this was an individual who inherited a superior title, leaving the title of Drumquhassle available for Alexander.)} of Polmaise, named Alexander. This Alexander Cunningham (first Laird of Drumquhassle) married Margaret Park (about 1502), and in this way acquired three quarters of the lands of Mugdock (the remainder, including the castle, was in the hands of the Clan Graham)). Alexander's son and heir, Andrew, married Mary, the daughter of Robert Erskine, 4th Lord Erskine, and their son John became the third Laird prior to July 1548. John married Isobel Cunningham (Janet, according to some records) a relative and co-heiress of the Polmaise estate. On 27 May 1556, her sisters (Margaret and Katherine) sold their parts of Polmaise to John and Isobelle. It was under the third laird that Drumquhassle was made a barony, with Drumquhassle Castle as its principal seat.

John and Isobelle had quite a large family, with six sons and three daughters.

- John (successor and fourth Laird after 1585)
- William of Polmaise (accused of conspiracy to treason related to the Raid of Ruthven, August 1584)
- Robert of Drumbeg, married Elspeth Buchanan and became ancestor of the 1st Baron Rossmore
- Cuthbert, Provost of the Collegiate church of Dumbarton
- Edward
- Matthew
- Janet, married Malcolm Douglas of Mains in 1562
- Egidia, married Robert Semple of Fullwood
- Mary, married Peter Napier of Kilmahew

John (the fourth Laird) was named in a 1587 Act of the Parliament of Scotland as one of "The General Band" of Landowners, and he continued to carry some of his father's high profile. He had at least two sons by Margaret Elphinstone, the eldest of which was also called John. After her death, he married Elizabeth (daughter of Lord Boyd, prior to 6 February 1575/76 (Note: Prior to 1 January 1600, Scotland officially changed the year number on March 25. In this article, "January 1584/5" means January 1584 by contemporary reckoning and January 1585 by modern reckoning.)) and Killermont was resigned to him by his father after their marriage. John became the fifth laird in 1590, sold Killermont House in 1628 and died without issue 1635. He was succeeded by his brother James as sixth laird. James' son (also James) is believed to have inherited the title (of seventh Laird) and little else about 1660. The house at Drumquhassle passed into the ownership of the Govane family who rebuilt the house in Drymen, Stirlingshire.

== Political influence ==
=== Reign of Mary, Queen of Scots ===
In 1544, the Laird of Drumquhassle was a supporter of his kinsman William Cunningham, Earl of Glencairn and the Earl of Lennox at the Battle of Glasgow (about a mile East of the modern city centre). The battle against the Governor of Scotland, Regent Arran, was bloody and the Earls lost, and many nobles and common men were killed, including Glencairn's son. Because of the uncertain date of death of the second laird, this individual could be either the second or third laird.

The third Laird of Drumquhassle, John Cunningham, inherited a combination of land ownership and a network of relatives and kin of importance. In October 1551, Regent Arran applied to Edward VI for a "safe-conduct" – a passport, for the Laird to travel to France for year via England with six companions. He became "Baillie, Chamberlain, Receiver of the Earldom of Lennox and Lordship of Darnley" – effectively the Earl of Lennox's right-hand man, and responsible for the Earl's financial matters. The Lennox lands included Drumquhassle and Loch Lomond in Dunbartonshire. John Cunningham of Drumquhassle was active in Scottish politics as at least as early as August 1560, when he is recorded as being present at the Scottish Reformation Parliament.

He seems to have been involved in protecting the Queen's interests in Edinburgh, and in June 1561, he was noted as a member of his kinsman Lord Mar's garrison at Edinburgh Castle, when he was involved in a debate about the retention of the town's artillery in the Castle. By April 1563, Drumquhassle is named again regarding the Burgh of Edinburgh, this time in the context of making preparations to protect the town from uprisings.

He was a suspect in the murder of David Rizzio on 9 March 1566. In July 1567, Drumquhassle was one of the group of seventy-five nobles and commissioners who signed Articles at the General Assembly of the Church of Scotland, effectively making Scotland a Protestant nation and paving the way for the demission of Mary as Queen regnant. These articles also ensured that the infant James would be brought up as a Protestant and therefore acceptable to the English as a future king, which ultimately led to the creation of the modern United Kingdom.

=== Regency of the Earl of Moray 1567–1570 ===
In 1567, James VI was crowned king at 13 months old, and James Stewart, 1st Earl of Moray, who was Mary, Queen of Scots' legitimated half-brother, became Regent. In December that year, Drumquhassle assisted in the summons for treason of the Earl of Bothwell, who was alleged to have murdered Henry Stewart, Lord Darnley, son of Matthew Stewart, 4th Earl of Lennox, Mary Queen of Scots husband, and father of the future James VI. In 1568 Drumquhassle was appointed Master of the Household of James VI at Stirling Castle.

=== Regency of the Earl of Lennox, 1570–71 ===
Following the assassination of Moray, the Regency passed to the Earl of Lennox, who was James VI's grandfather (through Lord Darnley). Drumquhassle brought the English army to Edinburgh in April 1570 as part of actions to bolster the position of Lennox as Regent during the early days of the Lang Siege. In July 1570, Drumquhassle was chosen as Collector General for a special tax levied to raise funds necessary to send ambassadors to England. It was also during this period that Dumbarton Castle was held by John Fleming for the supporters of Mary, Queen of Scots. Thomas Crawford of Jordanhill led the attack to regain control of the castle, while Drumquhassle supported with his men. Drumquhassle was made Captain of Dumbarton Castle after its surrender, and he appears to have later held this post concurrently with Master of the Royal Household, for which he is recorded as having received payments from the Treasurer of Scotland. Along with Matthew Douglas of Mains, all were discharged of any crimes committed during the action by an act of parliament.

=== Regencies of the Earl of Mar, 1571–72 and the Earl of Morton, 1572–1578 ===
After death of Lennox, John Erskine, Earl of Mar became regent for about a year, but was effectively under the control of the Earl of Morton, who became Regent of Scotland in 1572. John Cunningham of Drumquhassle was Mar's cousin through his mother, Mary Erskine.

During this period, influential members of the Scottish court were paid pensions from the Treasury of England, presumably for influence over James, the heir presumptive of the English throne. The English pension list for June 1574 shows Drumquhassle being given £150, and the following citation: "Drumwhessle; able to persuade by credit and counsel, especially about the King and Argyll, and apt to do good by the commodity of his office of Dumbarton, which he commands."

Morton himself fell from favour when the Frenchman Esmé Stewart, Sieur d'Aubigny, first cousin of James's father Lord Darnley, and future Earl of Lennox, arrived in Scotland, quickly establishing himself as the first of James's powerful male favourites. Morton was forced to resign in April 1578, and Drumquhassle and John Seton of Touch (as commissioners appointed by the king) accepted the surrender of Edinburgh Castle from George Douglas of Parkhead (Earl Morton's brother). This marked the end of Morton's power in Scotland. The declaration of James VI on 13 August 1578 stated that it was his "will and pleasure is also that the laird of Drumquhassle shall be free from his horning, to the effect he may render his account and thereafter return to his charge"

=== Early part of reign of James VI, 1578–1585 ===
In 1578 the Earl of Morton was deposed as Regent of Scotland and later accused of "art and part" in the murder of James' father, Lord Darnley, eleven years earlier. At this time that things started to turn sour for John Cunningham of Drumquhassle, and in July 1578 he received a summons to appear before the King and Privy Council at Stirling Castle to give his accounts for the Earldom of Lennox. He declined, sending a message that he feared for his life as the principal keepers of Stirling Castle were his "unfriends". Drumquhassle and his eldest son were the subject of a summons for treason in 1579, but the details of the summons are missing from the parliamentary record. In March 1580, James VI elevated his favourite, the French-born Esmé Stewart, sieur d'Aubigny, to Earl of Lennox and in August 1581 to Duke of Lennox, the highest noble and only duke in Scotland.

Despite Drumquassle's summons in 1579, it appears he escaped the charge, because he continued to act in public life and as an officer of the Lennox; in August 1580, d'Aubigny sought to take Dumbarton Castle under his direct control, intending to demote Drumquhassle from captain to constable, losing his authority to pay or move soldiers. The English ambassador Robert Bowes reported to Francis Walsingham that Drumquhassle asked for his advice, but within a matter of days, the gates of Edinburgh had been closed by d'Aubigny in order to detain Drumquhassle. Drumquhassle was forced to deliver Dumbarton Castle to d'Aubigny (agreeing a bond of £40000 Scots to do so). It was believed that d'Aubigny's sudden actions were the result of the interception of letters from England to Drumquhassle. Elizabeth I instructed Bowes to persuade Drumquhassle to retain control of Dumbarton Castle if possible, but the speed of events left the English powerless, with Bowes suggesting that Drumquhassle had expediently agreed to give up the castle, writing "the man hath more wit than honesty."

In March 1580/1, Drumquhassle and the Laird of Mains were both listed (along with others) as supporters of Morton, who was involved in a plot against d'Aubigny with support of the English crown. Some nobles and gentlemen had indeed been in the pay of the English, with Drumquhassle himself taking a pension from them. As Morton was charged with treason, imprisoned and executed in 1581, his supporters were now in a dangerous position. John Cunningham of Drumquhassle was one the guard that escorted Morton from Edinburgh to Dumbarton Castle in January 1581.

Positions were reversed with the capture of James VI at the Raid of Ruthven in August 1582 which marked the start of the Gowrie regime. This coup d'etat was supported by the English and the Church of Scotland and was fiercely Protestant, removing nobles with catholic tendencies, especially James Stewart, Earl of Arran, and d'Aubigny, now Duke of Lennox, from any position of influence over the king. In October 1582, d'Aubigny advised the King by letter not to accept the counsel of Gowrie, Mar, Dumfermline and Drumquhassle, but while it is not known whether the king received the advice, by naming Drumquhassle, he identified him as close to the heart of the current regime. Some sources allege that William Ruthven, 1st Earl of Gowrie was a reluctant figurehead for the new government. James Melville of Halhill asserted that Ruthven Castle (now Huntingtower) was chosen as the location of the Raid to draw Gowrie into the plot. Drumquhassle, wrote Melville, had persuaded Gowrie to act with the fiction that Lennox intended his demise. According to Melville, when Gowrie discovered he had been misled by Drumquhassle, the Earl then plotted to release James.

Following the release of James VI and collapse of the Ruthven regime in July 1583, the Earl of Arran took effective control of Scotland. Arran was head of the Catholic nobility and used his power to pursue his enemies, namely Gowrie, Mar and their supporters in the Scottish Reformation. In a matter of a few weeks, the English lost their influence over Scottish affairs and Drumquhassle was commanded by the king and Privy Council to enter Blackness Castle, a command which he obeyed. Despite previous assurances from the King that Drumquhassle would come to no harm, Bowes reported in August that a decision seemed to have been made to take revenge on him, with various accusations of him making plans against the King and the state, including one to hand Dumbarton over to the English. However, the final plot devised was one of Drumquhassle making arrangements with the English to have James VI taken to England and incarcerated in the same manner as his mother, Mary, Queen of Scots. The King may have partly believed the story himself, as his relationship with Bowes cooled significantly after this date, and Walsingham came to Scotland to deal with the King directly.

Drumquhassle was released to live under curfew at his own house for a time, attending the Privy Council when required. Following the successful prosecution and execution of the Earl of Gowrie, the Earl of Arran started to pursue any sympathisers of the Banished Lords, Angus, Mar, and the Master of Glamis, who had tried to hold Stirling Castle against Arran in April 1584. Drumquhassle's younger brother, Captain James Cunningham had been a companion of these lords at their failed coup in Stirling and in their exile in England. Charges of treason devised in July 1583 were now raised against James Edmonstone of Duntreath, Drumquhassle and his son-in-law, Malcolm Douglas of Mains in January 1584/5. (Note: This is a different matter from that which resulted in his previous summons for treason in 1579; the first summons predates the Raid of Ruthven.) Drumquhassle and Douglas of Mains were arrested in their own houses and taken to Edinburgh. The circumstances of Mains' relationship to Angus (notwithstanding his Douglas lineage) and Drumquhassle's relationship to both Mains (as father-in-law) and involvement in previous regencies sealed their fate.

The trial took the form of three dittays presented to an Assize in February 1584/5. The accusation was not one of Drumquhassle's direct participation in the Raid of Ruthven (it is mentioned that this had been overlooked due to the king's clemency), but that Edmonstone, Drumquhassle and Mains were to intercept the king while hunting and detain him in the lands of Lennox on the orders of the banished lords, delivered to them by their messenger, John Hume of Law, or "Black John". The plot was allegedly hatched in the Churches of Strathblane and Killearn and in the house of Mains in the months from October 1584 to January 1584/5. No record is known of Drumquhassle's defence, although Mains apparently held his own, undermining the case against him by its ridiculous nature. They were both hanged for treason on 9 February 1584/5, but this was not the end of the matter, for even when dead, Drumquhassle and Mains continued to have political value, both to Arran and his opponents. Arran's cruelty was recalled by the 17th-century historian David Hume of Godscroft;

"His crueltie, though conspicuous many wayes, did appear singularly in the causing execute Master Cunninghame of Drummewhasle, and Master Douglas of Maines, his sonne-in-law. This Cunninghame was an ancient Gentleman, and of an old house, who, himself in person, had beene a follower of the Earle of Lennox, and done him good service when he took in the Castel of Dumbertan, ... yet both of them were hanged at the Market Crosse of Edinburgh."

While Arran continued to strengthen his hold on power in Scotland, two issues remained beyond him, the banished lords and his poor diplomatic relationship with England. Over the following days, the Drumquassle/Mains plot was extended with new accusations directly implicating the banished lords. Three further alleged plots were presented to the court; firstly that the banished lords (Angus, Mar, Glamis and the Abbot of Arbroath) planned to raid Edinburgh with a thousand horsemen, but this was apparently deemed too difficult to conceal; secondly that thirty or forty horsemen should intercept the king on the fields, when his horse was tired and he was alone and convey him to the islands of Loch Lomond until the banished lords could receive him into their custody, but this plot was also apparently abandoned on the basis of its protracted and difficult nature. The third and final plot involved the recruitment of Robert Cunningham by the Abbot of Arbroath as part of an assassination team of eight men (two men being appointed by each of the lords). These eight men were to disguise themselves as beggars, cutting their horses tails, manes and ears so that they would not look fit and lie in wait for between three and six weeks to ambush the king and either shoot him or kill him by any other weapon. The motive for this was apparently that this was the only way that they could conceive the restoration of their family property lost after the Raid of Ruthven.

With these allegations of an extended plot established, Arran sent his ambassadors the Master of Gray and then Sir Lewis Bellenden to England to lay the same charges of treason successfully applied to Drumquhassle in Edinburgh to the lords in exile. However, events did not follow the same course as they had in Scotland; indeed, the banished lords gained greater favour from the English while Arran fell further in their estimation by his obvious subversion.

=== Later part of reign of James VI, 1585–1625 ===
In October 1585 the banished lords invaded Scotland and gained an easy victory over Arran, captured Stirling Castle with the King in November, and secured from him the restoration of their estates, and the control of the government. When the lords first approached Stirling Castle, Robert Hamilton of Inchmachan, the accuser of Drumquhassle and Mains, escaped out of the back of the castle but was chased and killed in the park. Following Arran's fall from power, Edmonstone admitted his perjury, saying that he had only testified to save his own life. The third laird's property was subsequently restored to his heir (also John Cunningham) by an act of parliament in 1585. In 1587, Drumquhassle was directly named in parliament and required by law to take action against "broken men" (reivers, etc.) living on his lands.

Drumquhassle's first marriage was to Margaret Elphinstone, daughter of Lord Elphinstone, and they had at least two sons, the eldest of which was John, who became the 5th laird in 1590. His lands included Portnellan, Galbraith, and Tullochan, with adjacent islands in Loch Lomond. As these were all in the Dukedom of Lennox, the second Duke (who was the son of d'Aubigny) would have been his feudal superior at this time.

His younger brother, Cuthbert Cunningham, was Provost of Dumbarton. He complained in August 1590 that his father had given him the lands of Boquhanne but his elder brother had claimed this property. With the help of his brother-in-law, the Master of Elphinstone and William Elphinstone, the Laird of Drumquassle was able to benefit from Cuthbert's inheritance.

In 1599, the fifth laird was made a freeman of the Burgh and City of Glasgow.

=== Reign of Charles I and loss of notability ===
As the fifth Laird, John sold off much of the family property – first the Mugdock lands, to John, Earl of Montrose in 1619, then Killermont (in New Kilpatrick) to John Stark in 1628. John and his brother James clearly had a dispute, as James was made to deposit a bond of caution in 1605 (possibly Lawburrows) as John and their mother feared for their safety on James' account.

John died without issue 1635 and succeeded by James, who as sixth Laird seemed to fare no better at maintaining the family estates. James lost Blairquhosh to Lord Napier following an uprising on the estate in 1638, and it is possible that another uprising at Bandalloch (Ballindalloch) in 1648 led to the passing of that estate to the Cunninghams of Drumbeg. His son James is believed to have inherited the title (of seventh Laird) and little else about 1660.
