= Alexander Ramsay (architect) =

Scottish builder and architect (1777 – 1847)

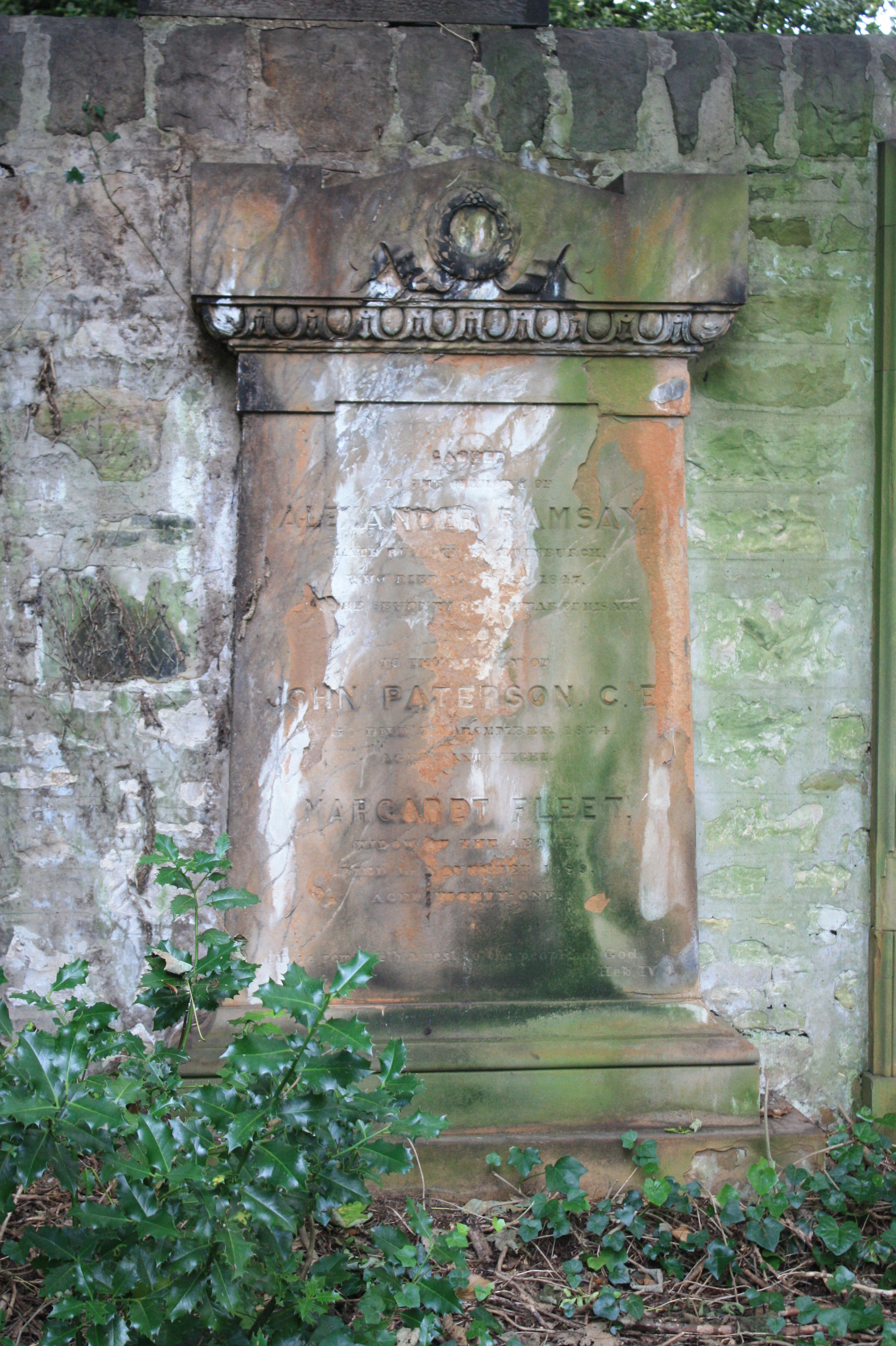
The grave of Alexander Ramsay, Warriston Cemetery

Alexander Ramsay (circa 1777 – 18 May 1847) was a Scottish builder and architect.

== Life ==
He was born in Edinburgh in 1777.

He rebuilt Craigend Castle, near Milngavie, for James Smith of Craigend, in a Gothic Revival style. Craigend was built on land that Smith's father had purchased from the Duke of Montrose, and which formerly formed part of the Mugdock Castle estate. The house was completed in 1812, but was gutted and partly demolished in 1968. The ruins form a picturesque part of Mugdock Country Park.

He lived at 16 Upper Grey Street in southern Edinburgh.

He is buried in Warriston Cemetery, Edinburgh, against the south wall. The monument records Ramsay's death on 18 May 1847.
