= Loch Ardinning =

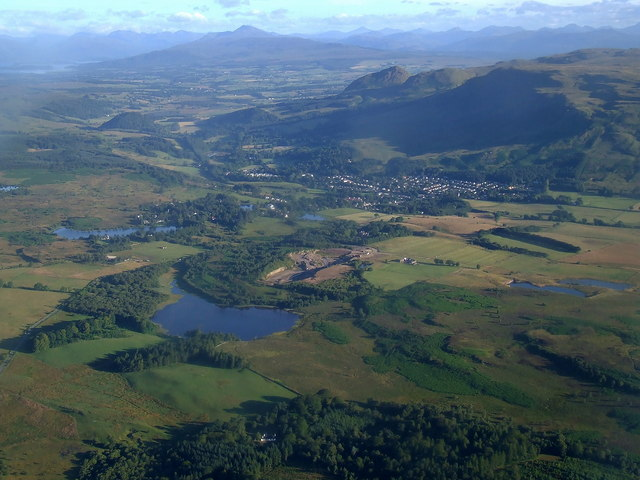
- View of Strathblane and Ben Lomond from the south-east with Loch Ardinning in the foreground

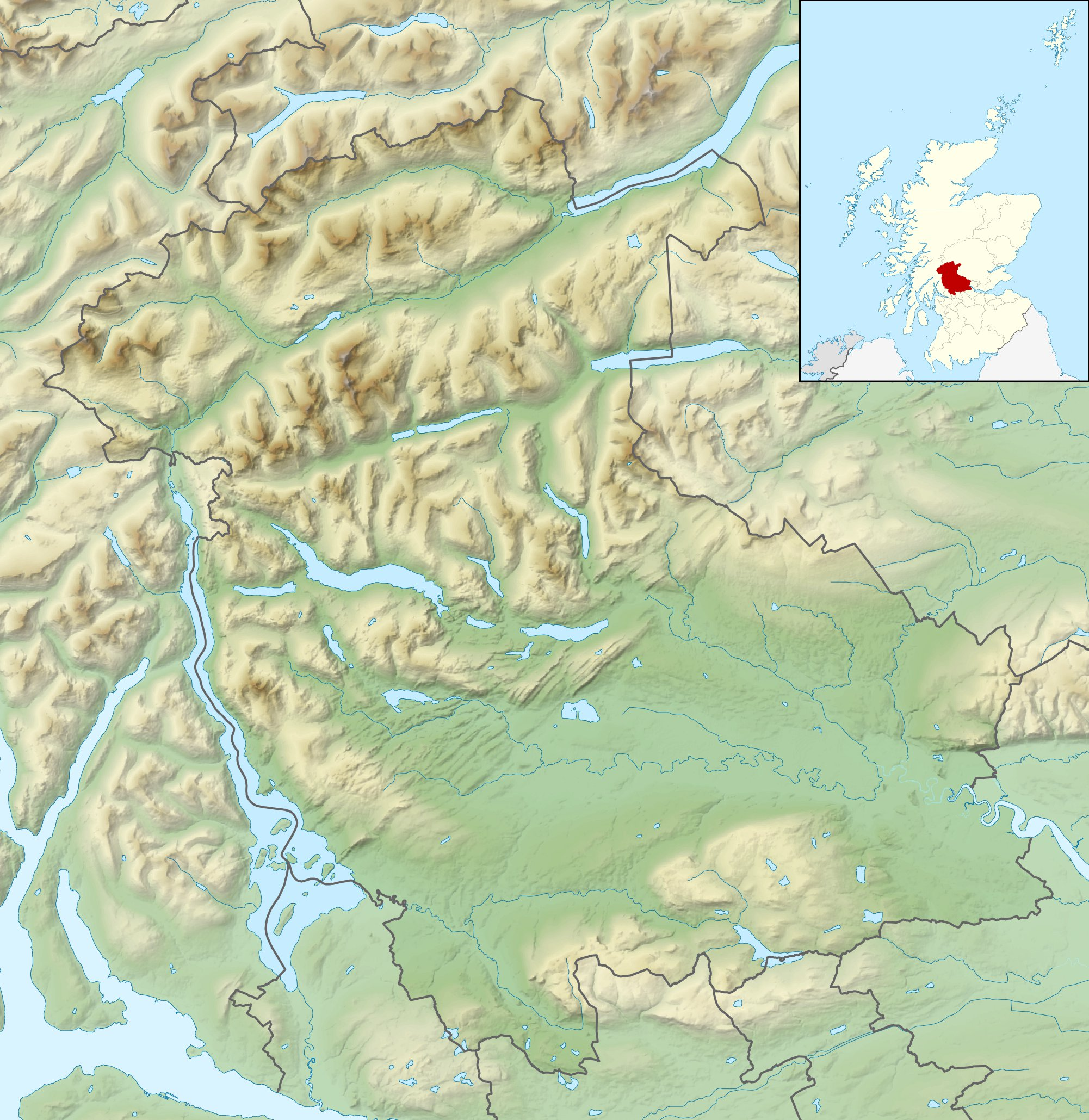
- Location within Stirling
- Location: Stirling District, Scotland
- Coordinates: 55.969584°N 4.296795°W
- Type: loch
- Basin countries: United Kingdom
- Surface area: 10 ha (25 acres)
- Average depth: 4.5 m (15 ft)
- Surface elevation: 137 m (449 ft)
- Settlements: Strathblane, Mugdock

Loch Ardinning (Scottish Gaelic: Loch Àird Dùnain) is a body of freshwater in the district of Stirling in Scotland, lying to the south of the village of Strathblane near the western end of the Campsies. The loch was increased in size by the construction of a dam in 1796; the level was further raised in 1840, and partially rebuilt in 1991. As its current extent, it covers 10 hectares.

== Loch Ardinning Reserve ==
The loch forms part of the Loch Ardinning Reserve, which is owned and managed by the Scottish Wildlife Trust. The reserve was established in 1988, and covers 148 hectares. It is classified as a Category IV protected area by the International Union for Conservation of Nature.

The reserve covers the woodland surrounding the loch, and Muirhouse Muir. The carr woodland surrounding the loch provides a habitat for many species of plants that have become increasingly rare elsewhere in Scotland due to wetland drainage; of particular note is the presence of four species of orchid. Muirhouse Muir is the largest area of muir in the surrounding area, and provides a habitat for bird species such as curlew, snipe, red grouse, linnet, whinchat, stonechat, skylark, and grasshopper warbler.
