= Craigend =

Craigend may refer to:

- Craigend, Angus, Scotland, United Kingdom
- Craigend, Glasgow, Scotland, United Kingdom
- Craigend, Scottish Borders, Scotland, United Kingdom
- Craigend, Stirling, Scotland, United Kingdom

== See also ==
- Craigend Castle, East Dunbartonshire, Scotland
- Craigends, Renfrewshire, Scotland
