= Strathblane Country House =

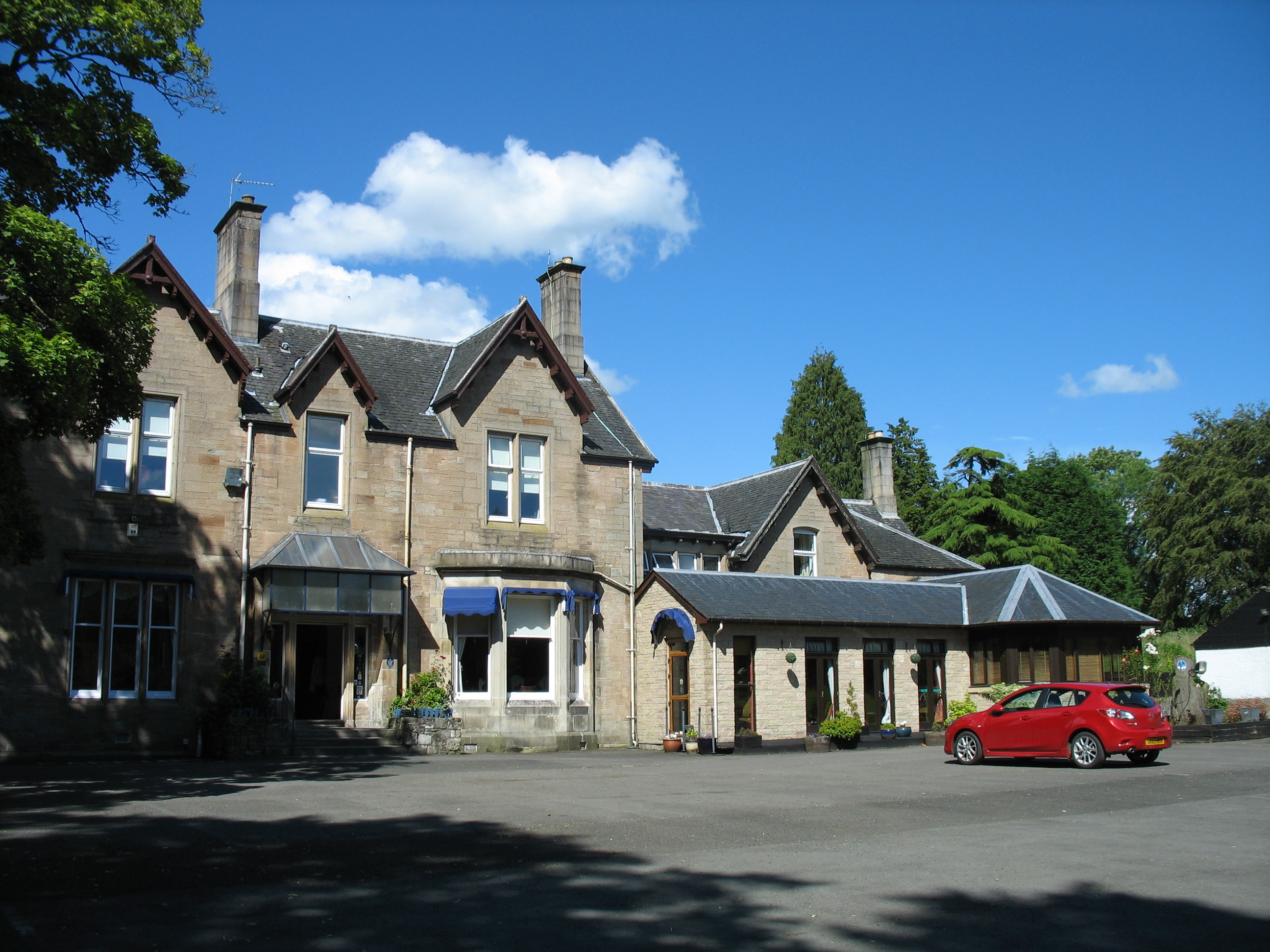
- Front aspect of Strathblane Country House

- Location within Stirling
- Former names: Ardunan House
- Alternative names: Taigh-mòr Shrath Bhlàthain

General information
- Architectural style: Late Victorian
- Location: 41 Milngavie Road, G63 9EH, Strathblane, Glasgow, Scotland
- Coordinates: 55°58′39″N 4°18′01″W
- Opened: 1874

Strathblane Country House is a late Victorian estate house near the village of Strathblane. It was built in 1874 as a mansion house for Robert Jameson of the law firm Jameson, Maclae & Baird (which today operates under the name Morton Fraser).

Back then the building was known as Ardunan House, taking its name from nearby Loch Ardinning (of which Ardunan and Ardinan – from Gaelic àird dùnain 'height of the small hill or fort' – are variants). The former gatekeeper's lodge, Ardunan Lodge, and Ardunan Farm still bear the name 'Ardunan'.

Much later it was converted into an hotel, initially known as the Ardunan Hotel until the company's dissolution in 1977, then as The Country Club Hotel, Strathblane Country House Hotel and latterly Strathblane Country House until its final closure in 2016. The property has subsequently been converted back to private accommodation.

It has hosted a number of celebrity events over the years including the wedding of Peter Capaldi and Elaine Collins in 1991 and several episodes of River City.
