= Dalnair Castle =

Scottish castle

Coordinates: 56.044°N 4.4374°W

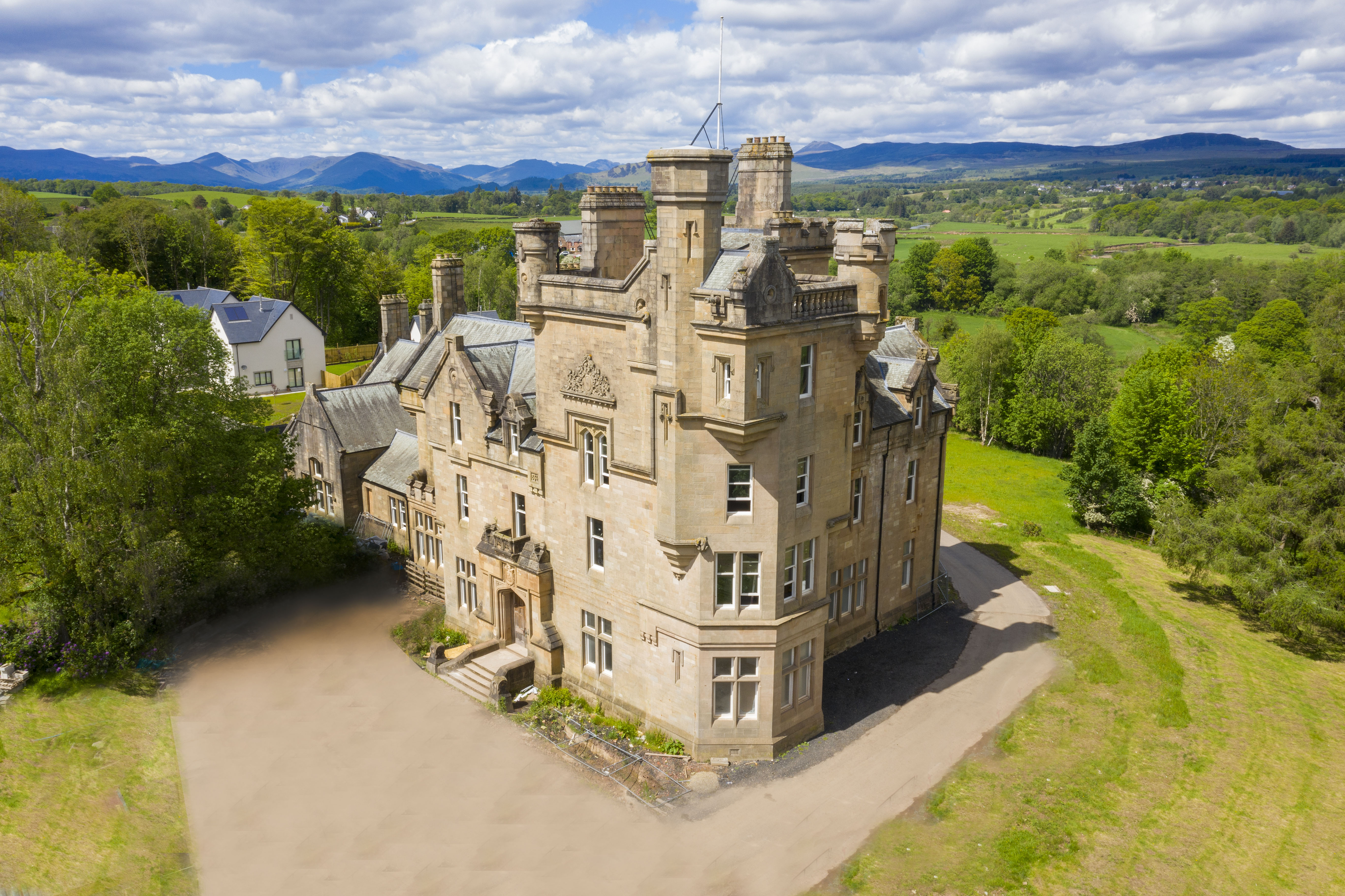
- Interactive map of the Dalnair Castle area

General information
- Location: Stirling, Croftamie, Scotland
- Completed: 1884

Dalnair Castle, also known as Dalnair House, is a Scottish baronial castle dating from around 1884. It is located outside the village of Croftamie in Stirling, Scotland, on the edge of Loch Lomond and The Trossachs National Park.

== History ==
=== 1884–1940s ===
Dalnair Castle was built for a Glaswegian merchant named Thomas Brown around 1884 on the site of the former much smaller "Endrickbank House".

The property survived a major fire that engulfed it in 1917. At the time of the fire the building belonged to Henry Christie, a calico printer, who owned it until the 1940s.

=== 1940s–2000s ===
The castle then passed into the hands of the Glasgow Western Hospital Board and it was used as a nurses' home until Killearn Hospital closed in 1972 For much of the 1970s it was a training and conference centre for British Steel. On 2000, it became a nursing home before becoming vacant and at risk of becoming a ruin.

=== 2016–present ===
In 2016 the FM Group, a Scottish property developer, bought the property and is refurbishing the baronial castle into luxury apartments. The plans also include construction work in the estate surrounding the castle, where a number of family homes have and continue to be built.

== See also ==
- List of castles in Stirling
- List of listed buildings in Drymen, Stirling
