= Rusky Castle =

Ruined castle in Stirling, Scotland

Rusky Castle Ruskie Castle
- Loch Rusky, Scotland

Site information
- Condition: Ruin

Location
- Coordinates: 56°12′10″N 4°14′6″W

Rusky Castle, also known as Ruskie Castle, is a ruined castle on an islet on Loch Rusky, Stirling, Scotland. The islet is now submerged. The castle was known to be held by Sir John de Menteith.
