= List of listed buildings in Drymen, Stirling =

This is a list of listed buildings in the parish of Drymen in Stirling, Scotland.

== List ==
Name	Location	Date Listed	Grid Ref. (Note: Sometimes known as OSGB36, the grid reference (where provided) is based on the British national grid reference system used by the Ordnance Survey. • "Guide to National Grid". Ordnance Survey. • "Get-a-map". Ordnance Survey.)	Geo-coordinates	Notes	LB Number (Note: Historic Environment Scotland assign a unique alphanumeric identifier to each designated site in Scotland, for listed buildings this always begins with "LB", for example "LB12345".)	Image
Buchanan Farmhouse And Attached Steading (Flats 1-5 Buchanan Home Farm), Including Pair Of Pavilion Blocks To North				56°03′49″N 4°27′43″W	Category C(S)	3898	Upload Photo
Drymen Bridge (Over Endrick Water)				56°03′19″N 4°27′13″W	Category B	3900	Upload another image See more images
Drymen, 27 Main Street				56°03′46″N 4°27′08″W	Category C(S)	48980	Upload Photo
Corrie Aqueduct Bridge (Former Glasgow Corporation Water Works)				56°07′48″N 4°26′19″W	Category B	51153	Upload Photo
Finnich Malise, Entrance Lodge And Gateway				56°02′21″N 4°26′16″W	Category C(S)	6572	Upload Photo
Gartinstarry, Including Boundary Wall To South East And Gartinstarry Cottage				56°06′57″N 4°19′41″W	Category B	3938	Upload Photo
Drymen, Main Street, War Memorial				56°03′54″N 4°27′08″W	Category C(S)	48982	Upload Photo
Auchentroig				56°06′44″N 4°20′28″W	Category B	48991	Upload Photo
Dalnair House, Entrance Lodge And Gateway				56°02′29″N 4°26′25″W	Category C(S)	49001	Upload Photo
Finnich Malise Wash House Over Burn To East Of Walled Garden				56°02′10″N 4°26′22″W	Category C(S)	6573	Upload Photo
Ballochneck Bridge (Over Cashley Burn)				56°07′04″N 4°18′11″W	Category B	3939	Upload Photo
Aucheneck House, Entrance Gateway				56°01′23″N 4°24′51″W	Category C(S)	48990	Upload Photo
Dalnair House				56°02′38″N 4°26′15″W	Category B	49000	Upload another image
Finnich Malise, Including Summer House To South				56°02′13″N 4°26′34″W	Category B	6570	Upload Photo
Finnich Malise Steading And Stable Block				56°02′11″N 4°26′40″W	Category B	6571	Upload Photo
Buchanan Castle, East Lodge And Entrance Gateway				56°03′31″N 4°27′18″W	Category B	3899	Upload another image
Balfunning House, Former Stable Block (East And West Stables)				56°04′31″N 4°23′47″W	Category C(S)	48995	Upload Photo
Ballochneck, Stables To South				56°06′33″N 4°19′19″W	Category C(S)	48998	Upload Photo
To North Of Gartachoil, Milepost At Ns 5344 9349				56°06′42″N 4°21′31″W	Category C(S)	49003	Upload Photo
Drymen, 4 The Square				56°03′58″N 4°27′10″W	Category C(S)	49636	Upload Photo
Hoish Aqueduct Overflow Or Outlet (Former Glasgow Corporation Water Works)				56°06′15″N 4°22′49″W	Category C(S)	51154	Upload Photo
Dalnair Farmhouse				56°02′37″N 4°25′03″W	Category B	3907	Upload Photo
Drymen, The Square, The Winnock				56°03′57″N 4°27′11″W	Category B	3912	Upload Photo
Craigivairn, Including Adjacent Stone Built Farm Outbuildings				56°05′17″N 4°25′27″W	Category B	3913	Upload Photo
Duchray Castle				56°10′03″N 4°26′52″W	Category B	3914	Upload Photo
Strathendrick Golf Club, Pavilion				56°03′26″N 4°27′03″W	Category C(S)	48985	Upload Photo
Balfunning House, East Lodge And Entrance Gateway				56°04′25″N 4°23′11″W	Category C(S)	48994	Upload Photo
Castle Burn Aqueduct Bridge (Former Glasgow Corporation Water Works)				56°09′28″N 4°27′52″W	Category A	51152	Upload Photo
Park Of Drumquhassle, Including Gatepiers To West				56°03′04″N 4°26′16″W	Category C(S)	3901	Upload Photo
Auchentroig, Old Auchentroig				56°06′44″N 4°20′32″W	Category A	3937	Upload Photo
Drymen, Stirling Road, Former United Secession Chapel (Drymen Church Hall)				56°04′00″N 4°27′03″W	Category C(S)	48983	Upload Photo
Duchray Castle Lodge, Including Boundary Wall/				56°10′02″N 4°26′40″W	Category C(S)	48984	Upload Photo
Balfunning House, West Lodge And Entrance Gateway				56°04′31″N 4°23′50″W	Category C(S)	48996	Upload Photo
Clachanry Farmhouse And Attached Wings				56°04′07″N 4°23′29″W	Category C(S)	48999	Upload Photo
To East Of Garrauld, Milepost At Ns 5324 9192				56°05′51″N 4°21′39″W	Category C(S)	49002	Upload Photo
Finnich Malise, Walled Garden				56°02′09″N 4°26′31″W	Category B	6574	Upload Photo
Park Of Drumquhassle, Sundial To South East Of House				56°03′03″N 4°26′16″W	Category B	3903	Upload Photo
Chapelarroch Farm Bridge				56°07′55″N 4°23′16″W	Category C(S)	48875	Upload Photo
Auchentroig, Walled Garden Adjoining Old Auchentroig To The South West				56°06′43″N 4°20′34″W	Category C(S)	48992	Upload Photo
Balfunning House				56°04′30″N 4°23′41″W	Category B	48993	Upload Photo
To South Of Kepculloch Toll, Milepost At Ns 5438 9189				56°05′51″N 4°20′33″W	Category C(S)	49004	Upload Photo
Park Of Drumquhassle, Dovecot To North				56°03′10″N 4°26′13″W	Category B	3902	Upload Photo
Drymen, Main Street, Drymen Church (Church Of Scotland), Including Gatepiers And Boundary Wall				56°03′40″N 4°27′10″W	Category B	3911	Upload Photo
Balmaha Road, Bridge Over Mill Burn				56°04′04″N 4°27′25″W	Category C(S)	48979	Upload Photo
Drymen, Main Street, Former Drymen Manse (Endrick Hill)				56°03′35″N 4°27′11″W	Category C(S)	48981	Upload Photo
Aucheneck House				56°01′12″N 4°25′43″W	Category C(S)	48989	Upload Photo
Ballochneck				56°06′35″N 4°19′18″W	Category B	48997	Upload Photo

== Key ==
The scheme for classifying buildings in Scotland is:

- Category A: "buildings of national or international importance, either architectural or historic; or fine, little-altered examples of some particular period, style or building type."
- Category B: "buildings of regional or more than local importance; or major examples of some particular period, style or building type, which may have been altered."
- Category C: "buildings of local importance; lesser examples of any period, style, or building type, as originally constructed or moderately altered; and simple traditional buildings which group well with other listed buildings."

In March 2016 there were 47,288 listed buildings in Scotland. Of these, 8% were Category A, and 50% were Category B, with the remaining 42% being Category C.
