= Mugdock =

Coordinates: 55.966°N 4.311°W

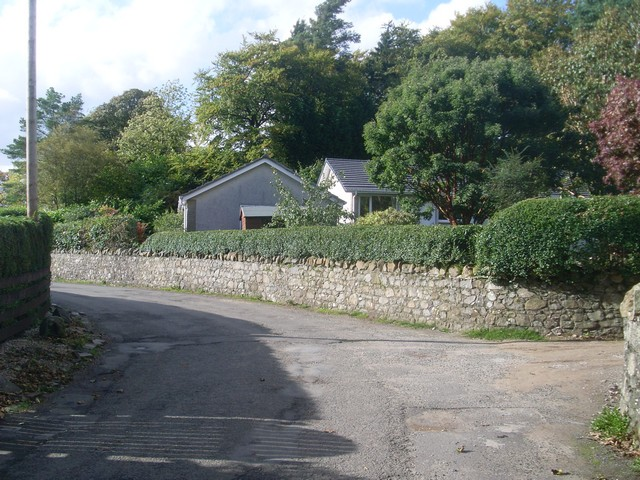
- The road through the centre of Mugdock

- Location within the Stirling council area
- OS grid reference: NS558771
- Civil parish: Strathblane
- Council area: Stirling
- Lieutenancy area: Stirling and Falkirk
- Country: Scotland
- Sovereign state: United Kingdom
- Post town: Glasgow
- Postcode district: G62
- Dialling code: 0141
- Police: Scotland
- Fire: Scottish
- Ambulance: Scottish
- UK Parliament: Stirling and Strathallan
- Scottish Parliament: Stirling

Mugdock is a hamlet in Stirlingshire, Scotland. It lies to the south of the village of Strathblane, and was in the civil parish.

In the past the hamlet had more significance. It was considered the main village of the civil parish of Strathblane. However, since the 19th century it has shrunk down to a small collection of houses. This means that Mugdock is now a hamlet.

In the year 750 a battle was recorded in the Annals of Ulster as having taken place 'between the Picts and the Britons'. Talorgan, son of Uurgust, brother of Unust King of the Picts, died there. The battle is also recorded by the medieval Welsh text Annales Cambriae which names the battle site as Mocetauc. This is fairly plausibly explained as Mugdock, which lies roughly in the area where the ancient Pictish and Breton kingdoms must have met.

Despite being located in Stirlingshire, it has a G62 postcode.

Mugdock Country Park is located outside of the hamlet.

== See also ==
- Mugdock Castle
- Craigend Castle
- Mugdock Reservoir
- Mugdock Loch
