= Strathblane =

Coordinates: 55°59′08″N 4°18′22″W

Strathblane: Scottish Gaelic: Strath Bhlàthain
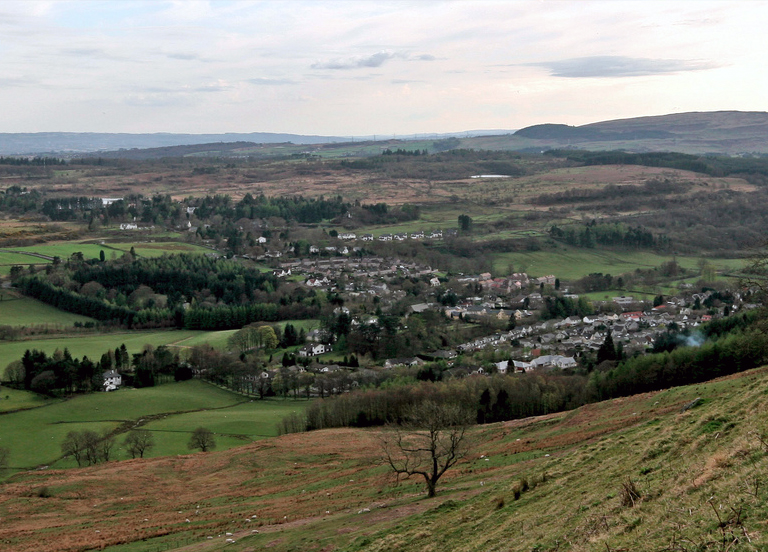
- A view over Strathblane from Ballagan

- Location within the Stirling council area
- Area: 17 sq mi (44 km^{2})
- Population: 2,000 (2020)
  - Density: 54/km^{2} (140/sq mi)
- OS grid reference: NS561794
  - Edinburgh: 46 mi (74 km) E
  - London: 358 mi (576 km) SSE
- Civil parish: Strathblane
- Council area: Stirling
- Lieutenancy area: Stirling and Falkirk
- Country: Scotland
- Sovereign state: United Kingdom
- Post town: GLASGOW
- Postcode district: G63
- Dialling code: 01360
- Police: Scotland
- Fire: Scottish
- Ambulance: Scottish
- UK Parliament: Stirling and Strathallan
- Scottish Parliament: Stirling

Strathblane (Scottish Gaelic: Strath Bhlàthain, pronounced [s̪t̪ɾahˈvl̪ˠaː.ɪɲ]) is a village and parish in the registration county of Stirling, situated in the southwestern part of the Stirling council area, in central Scotland. It lies at the foothills of the Campsie Fells and the Kilpatrick Hills on the Blane Water, 12 miles (19 km) north of Glasgow, 14 miles (23 km) east-southeast of Dumbarton, and 20 miles (32 km) southwest of Stirling. Strathblane is a dormitory village for Greater Glasgow, and has a total resident population of 1,811.

Historically, Strathblane was the name of a parish in Stirlingshire which comprised three villages: Edenkill, Netherton and Mugdock. Mugdock was the ancient seat of the Earls of Lennox, and to the east of Strathblane lies the town of Lennoxtown. Blanefield is a settlement contiguous with Strathblane's northwestern fringe. To the west is the volcanic plug Dumgoyne, Glengoyne Distillery and the Trossachs National Park. The West Highland Way—a long-distance trail—passes close to the village.

The Gaelic name Strath Bhlàthain translates to English as "the valley of the Blane", with reference to the Blane Water, a watercourse. The Blane Water (Uisge Bhlàthain) has also been referred to as Beul-abhainn (Scottish Gaelic pronunciation: [ˈpial̪ˠa.ɪɲ]) meaning "mouth-river" after the numerous burns merging. One of its tributaries, the Ballagan Burn passes over the waterfall the Spout of Ballagan which shows 192 alternate strata of coloured shales and limestone (including pure alabaster). The Blane flows into the Endrick, which, in its turn, flows westward to Loch Lomond.

== History ==
Historian William Forbes Skene suggested Strathblane to have been the site of the battle between the Britons and Picts in the year 750, during which Talorgan son of Fergus, brother of Óengus I of the Picts, was slain. The Annales Cambriae and Annals of Ulster refer to the battlefield as "Mocetauc" or "Catohic" respectively, which Skene and others have suggested referred to Mugdock, a locality at the edge of Lennox, within the parish of Strathblane.

A rise in population during the early 19th century was due in part to the development of a large calico printfield at Blanefield (employing 78 adults and 45 children under 14) and two bleachfields at Dumbrock (employing 67 adults and 14 children under 14) working 10–11 hours per day, 6 days a week. There is no sign of this industry in the village today which has a rural, picturesque aspect while the majority of parishioners now commute to work in neighbouring towns.

=== Edmonstones of Duntreath ===
The principal local family were the Edmonstones of Duntreath who had ancient links to the Kings of Scotland. In 1374 Sir John Edmonstone was an ambassador to France for King Robert II, subsequently his son Sir Archibald Edmonstone settled the family at Duntreath. In 1425, Sir Archibald's son Sir William Edmondstone of Culloden married Mary Stewart, Princess of Scotland (second daughter of Robert III) and they had a son whom they named Sir William Edmonstone of Duntreath. The family gained a house at Colzium when the Livingstones of Kilsyth lost the estate due to their Jacobite sympathies. More recently Edward VII's mistress Alice Keppel (née Alice Frederica Edmonstone) was the eighth daughter of the 4th Baronet, and is the great-grandmother of Camilla, Duchess of Rothesay, the second wife of the Prince Charles, Duke of Rothesay.

== Governance ==
Strathblane lies within the registration county and Lieutenancy of Stirlingshire, which was an administrative county until local government reorganisation in 1975. From 1975 to 1996 it was part of the Central region of Scotland. Since 1996, Strathblane has formed part of the Stirling council area.

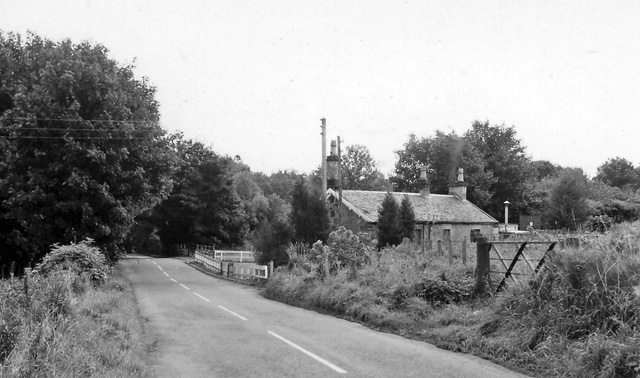
The remains of Blanefield railway station in 1974

For elections to Stirling Council, Strathblane is part of the Forth and Endrick ward. The ward returns three councillors under a system of proportional representation. At the 2022 elections one councillor each was elected from the Conservative, Labour and Scottish National Parties.

Strathblane community council represents the villages of Strathblane, Blanefield and Mugdock.

== Geography ==
Strathblane is situated at the southern foot of the Campsie Fells, on the Blane Water, 265 feet (81 m) above sea level. The prevailing rock of Strathblane's hills is basalt, and that of its lowlands Old Red Sandstone. The soil is sandy in the upper part of the strath, and clayey in the lower.

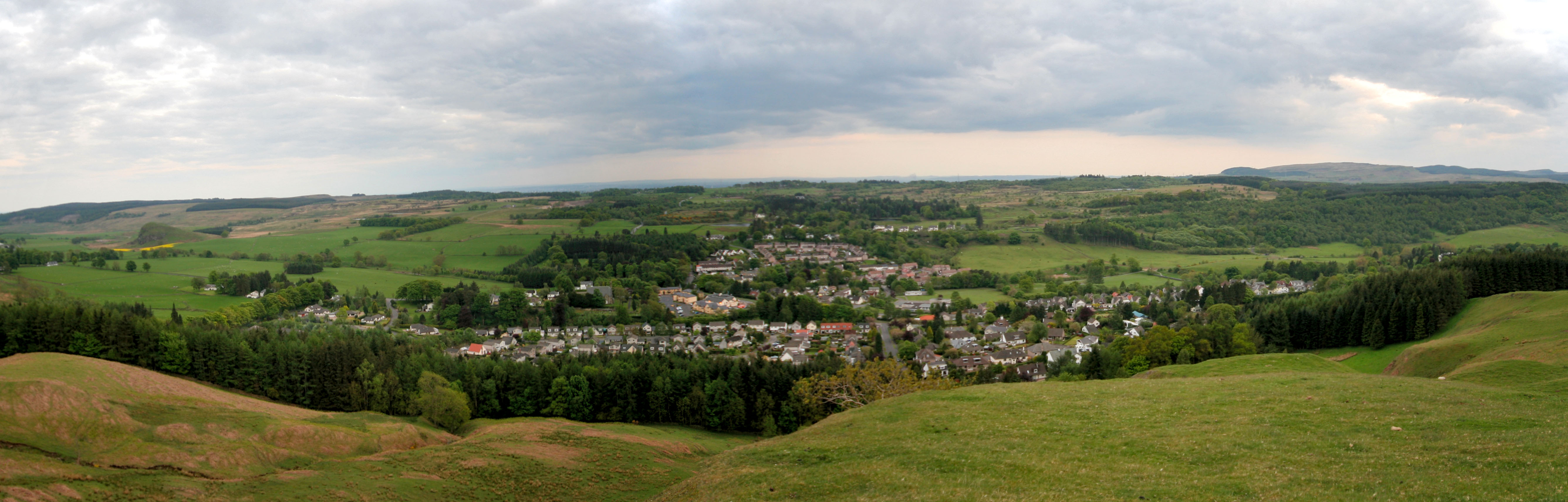
A panorama of Strathblane from the rocky ridge leading to Earl's Seat.

== Demography ==
The village of Strathblane has a total resident population of 1,811, whilst the wider Strathblane Community Council Area, which covers 44 square kilometres (17.0 sq mi), has a larger population of 2,396.

The population of the Parish was 620 in 1795, the 1871 census reported 1,235 which had grown to 1,811 by the time of the 2001 census.

Year	1801	1811	1821	1831	1841	1851	1861	1871	1881	1891	1901	1911	1921	1951
Population	734	795	748	1,033	894	1,010	1,388	1,235	1,343	1,671	880	1,024	1,275	1,354
Source:A Vision of Britain through Time

== Economy ==
Tourism plays a prominent economic role in Strathblane. Tourists visit the area for the walks and the local scenery of the moors. There are local amenities in Strathblane, including post office, library, grocery shop, hairdressers, chemist, deli, and hotel, to name a few. The Blane Valley Inn closed in early 2020. There was a bank in Strathblane, but in 2014 it closed down.

The parish was formerly connected to Glasgow via Edinburgh and Glasgow Railway and the Blane Valley Railway, with stations at Campsie Glen, Strathblane, Blanefield, Dumgoyne and Killearn, which opened in 1867 (extended to Aberfoyle in 1882). However, the line became uncompetitive with the growth of road transport, and closed to passengers in 1951 and to freight in 1959.

== Landmarks ==
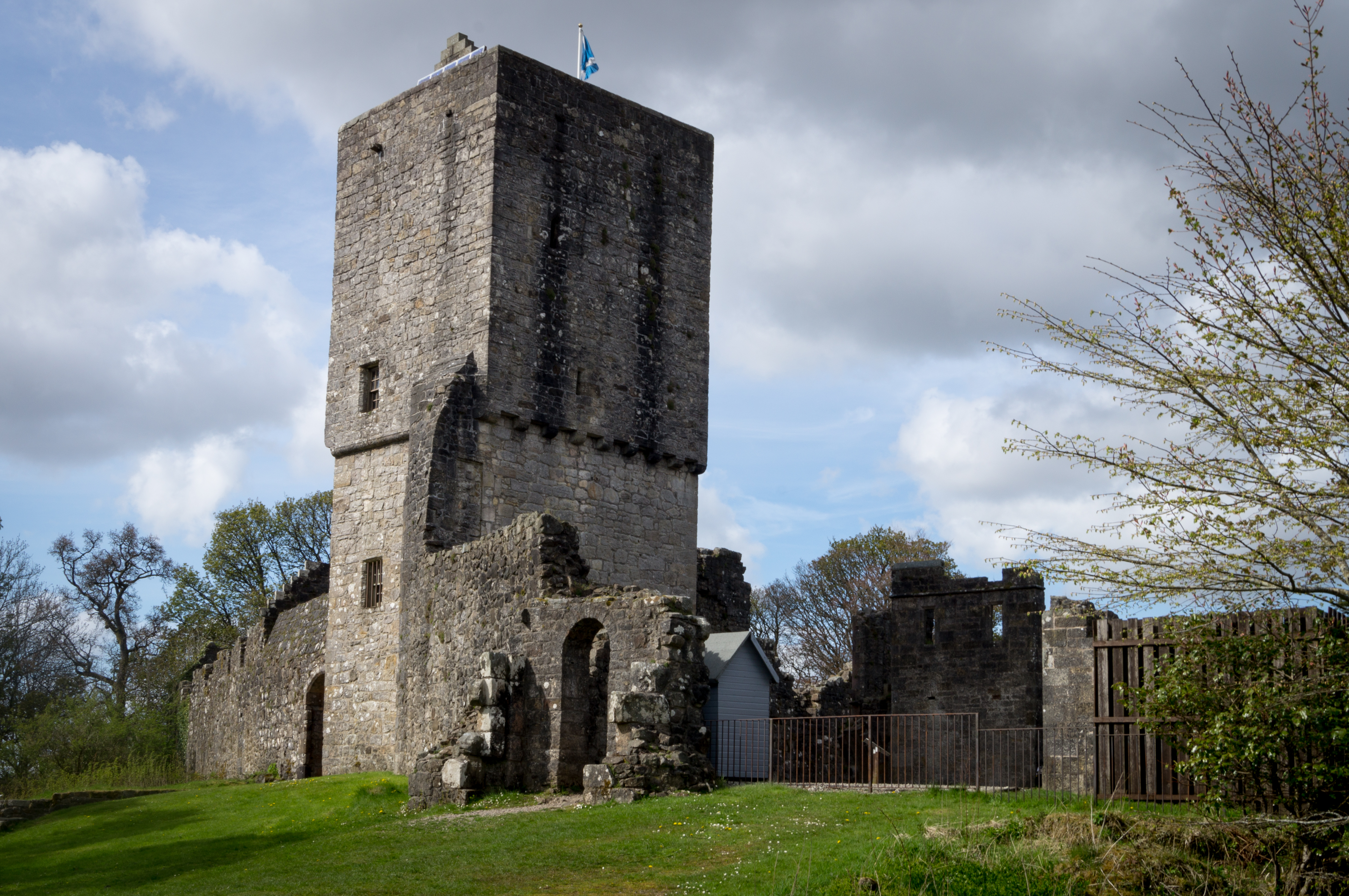
Mugdock Castle was the stronghold of the Clan Graham.

Mugdock Castle was the stronghold of the Clan Graham from the middle of the 13th century. Its ruins are located in Mugdock Country Park at Strathblane's southern extremity with Milngavie.

The Stirling Observer dated 25 August 1921 reported the unveiling of "a monument erected in memory of those ..[25 men of Strathblane]... who fell in the Great War" by the Duke of Montrose and Sir Archibald Edmonstone, whose family seat was Duntreath Castle by Blanefield. The monument was designed by Robert Lorimer and was constructed of Doddington stone. It consists of a square base, each side being panelled to receive the inscriptions and names, a "slender shaft" rises from the base, and at the top of the shaft are four shields, the finish being a cross.

The Duke of Montrose in unveiling the monument paid tribute to the sacrifice made by those from the parish who had died for their country. He said "what the war had meant to those who took part in it, and what their sacrifice meant to those who had benefited by their death, and what it ought to mean to the people of our land as an incentive to noble and self sacrificing lives."

Strathblane Parish Church, built in 1803, is a Church of Scotland, part of the Presbytery of Stirling, and Synod of Forth. There is also a Catholic church dedicated to St. Kessog.

== Education ==
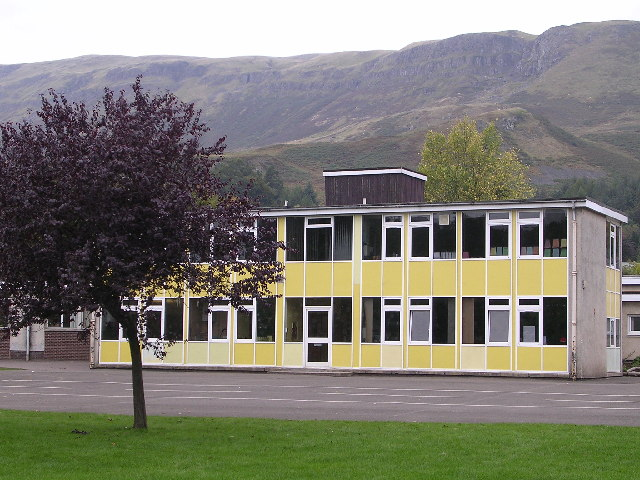
Strathblane Primary School

Strathblane Primary School is the local primary school. Strathblane and Blanefield are in the catchment area for Balfron High School, but are closer to many high schools in East Dunbartonshire such as Douglas Academy.

== Sport ==
Blanefield Thistle F.C. is a local Association football team. There are clubs and organisations for bowls, darts, karate, snooker and bowls.

== Notable people ==
James Gordon, Baron Gordon of Strathblane is a businessman and manager granted a Life Peerage granted the territorial qualification of Deil's Craig in Stirling.

Alfred Yarrow, later Sir Alfred Yarrow, 1st Baronet of Yarrow Shipbuilders in Scotstoun was a local resident and funded the construction of the Strathblane Village Club in 1911.

== See also ==
- Strathblane Country House
