= John Smith & Son =

British academic bookseller

John Smith & Son is a British academic bookseller based in Ringwood, Hampshire, England.

Founded in 1751, it is the oldest bookselling company in the English-speaking world. It was based for many years at 57–61 St. Vincent Street in Glasgow, Scotland, which was also its principal retail outlet. A circulating library (established by Smith as Glasgow's first circulating library and Scotland's second overall) ultimately evolved into the academic bookselling arm of the business. From 1751 its chairmen have been three Smiths, three Knoxes and Robert Clow (1934–2022), who became the first chairman in 2000 of the continuing John Smith Group.

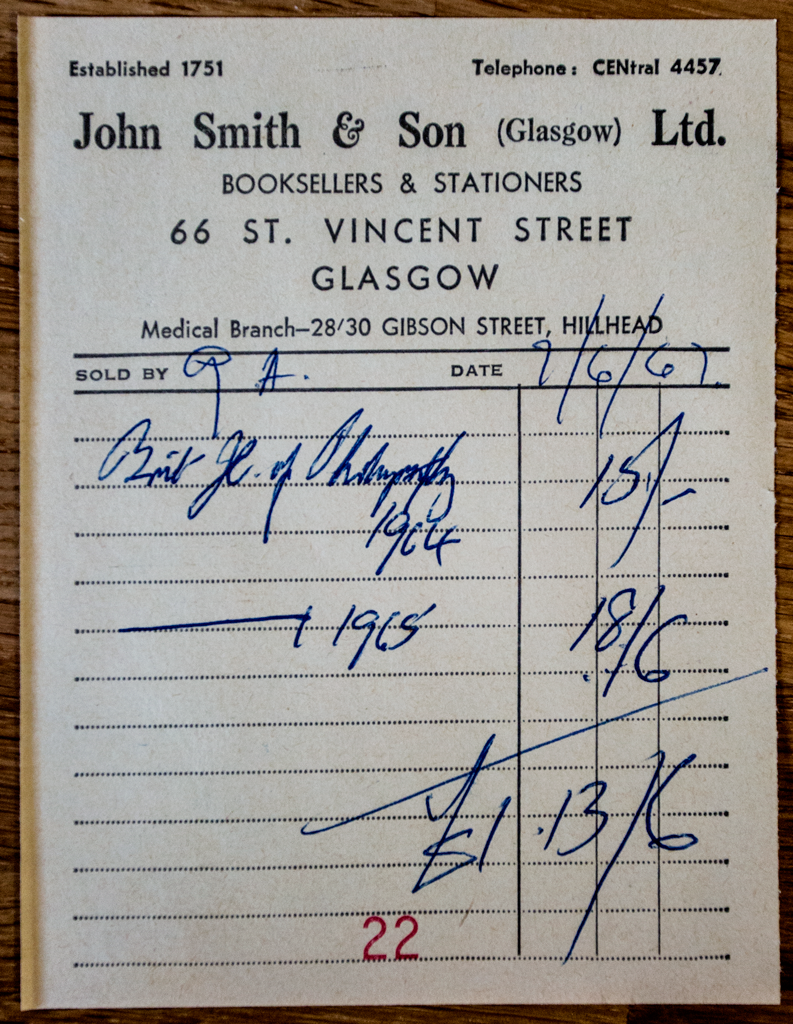
John -Smith & Son Receipt

The St. Vincent Street shop, along with the general retail part of the business, closed in 2000. However, as part of the JS Group it continues to trade as an academic bookseller, with campus outlets including Glasgow University, Strathclyde University, and the University of London as well as overseas.

== See also ==
- Book trade in the United Kingdom
- John Smith, Youngest (1784-1849), and the book trade of Glasgow. PhD thesis of Stephen Hall, 2017
