= Craigend Castle =

Ruined country house in Stirling, Scotland

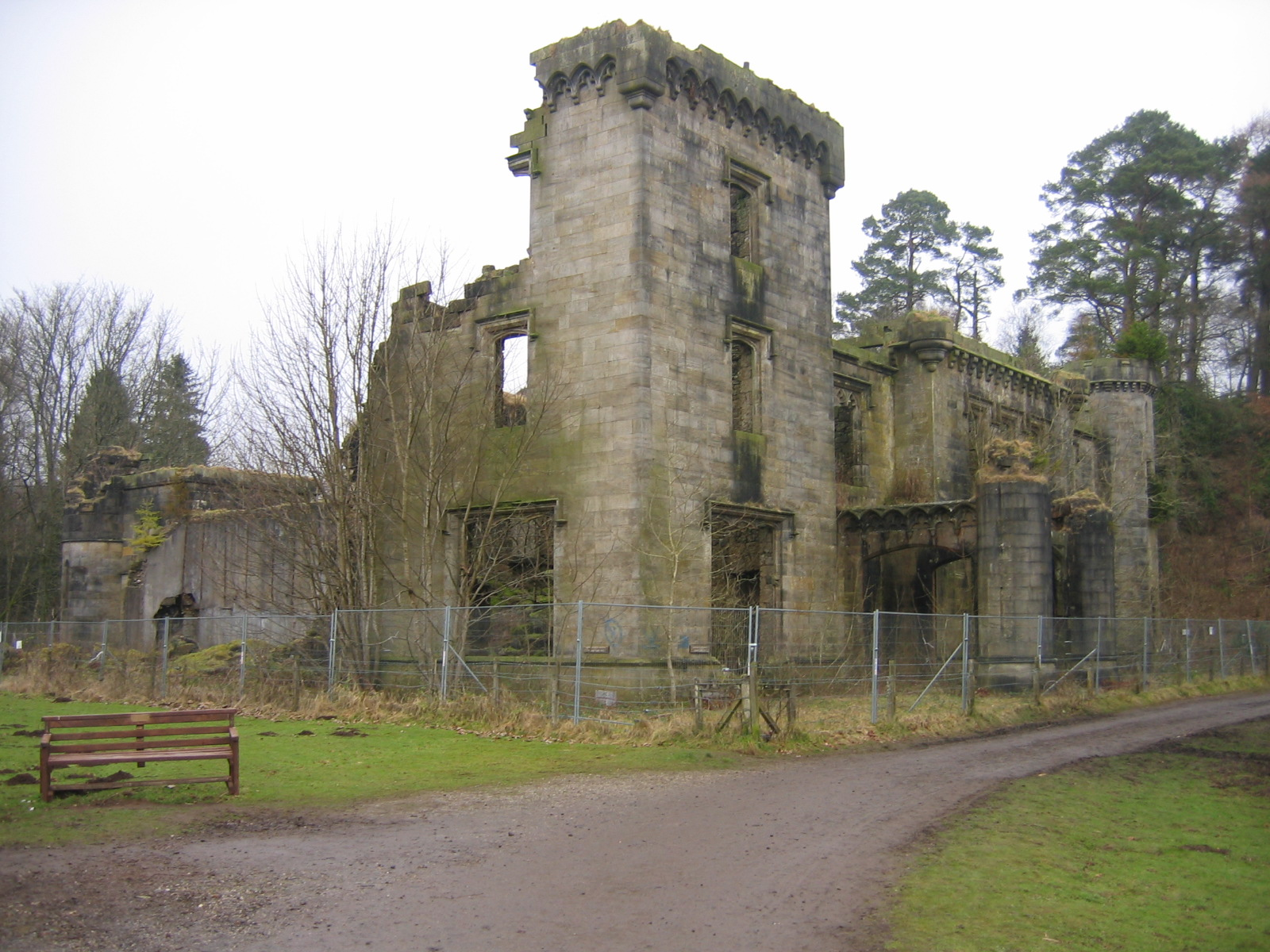
The ruins of Craigend Castle in Mugdock Country Park

Craigend Castle is a ruined country house, located to the north of Milngavie, in Stirlingshire, central Scotland.

== Early history ==
The lands of Craigend were part of the Barony of Mugdock in medieval times, but the estate was sold in the mid-17th century to the Smith family. John Smith (1739–1816) was born at Craigend and became a merchant and the founder, in 1751, of booksellers John Smith & Son. John Smith built a plain house on the estate, but after his death, in 1816, his son, James Smith, incorporated that house in a much more ornate mansion. It was built by Alexander Ramsay, initially using designs by James Smith of Jordanhill, in what is described as Regency Gothic style.

== 1851 ==
Craigend was sold to Sir Andrew Buchanan, the former Ambassador to the Habsburg court in Vienna, in 1851.

James Outram, chartered accountant and nephew of George Outram the one-time owner of the Glasgow Herald newspaper, later leased the Castle from the Buchanan family in the early years of the 20th Century.

== 1920s ==
In 1920, Craigend Castle was tenanted by Sir Harold E. Yarrow, Chairman & Managing Director of Yarrow Shipbuilders, who moved there from 'Fairlawn', Ralston Road, Bearsden. Glasgow businessman Andrew Wilson and his zoologist son, William, bought part of Craigend Estate from the Buchanan family and opened a zoo at Craigend Castle and stables in 1949, with various exotic animals, but it failed to attract significant visitors and eventually closed in 1955.

The stables and zoo grounds became part of Mugdock Country Park but the main house has become a ruin. The stable block, located to the north of the house, now serves as the country park visitor centre. Craigend Estate, adjacent, is privately owned and is operated as a cattle and sheep farm.

== Gallery ==
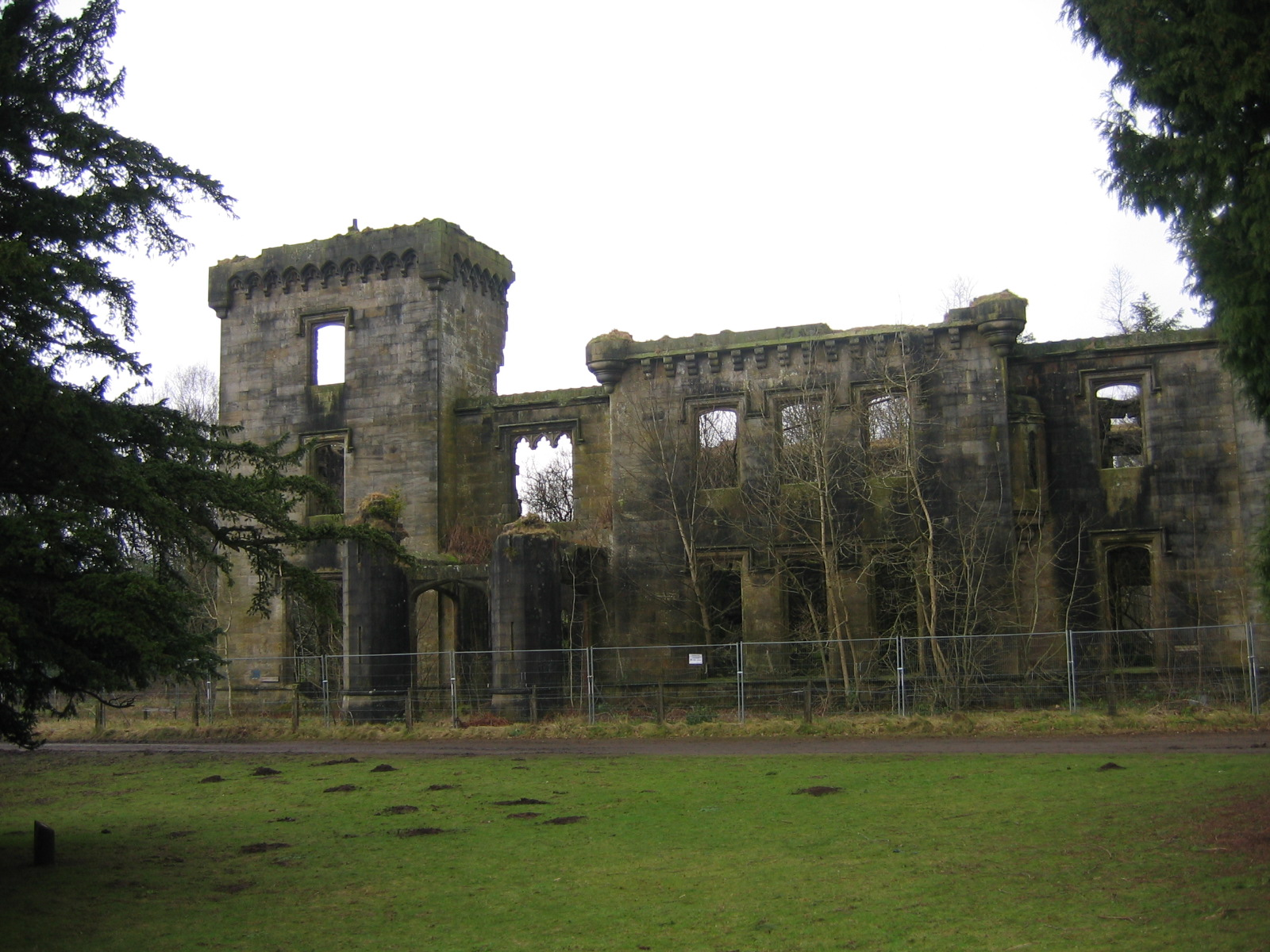
Another view of the ruins

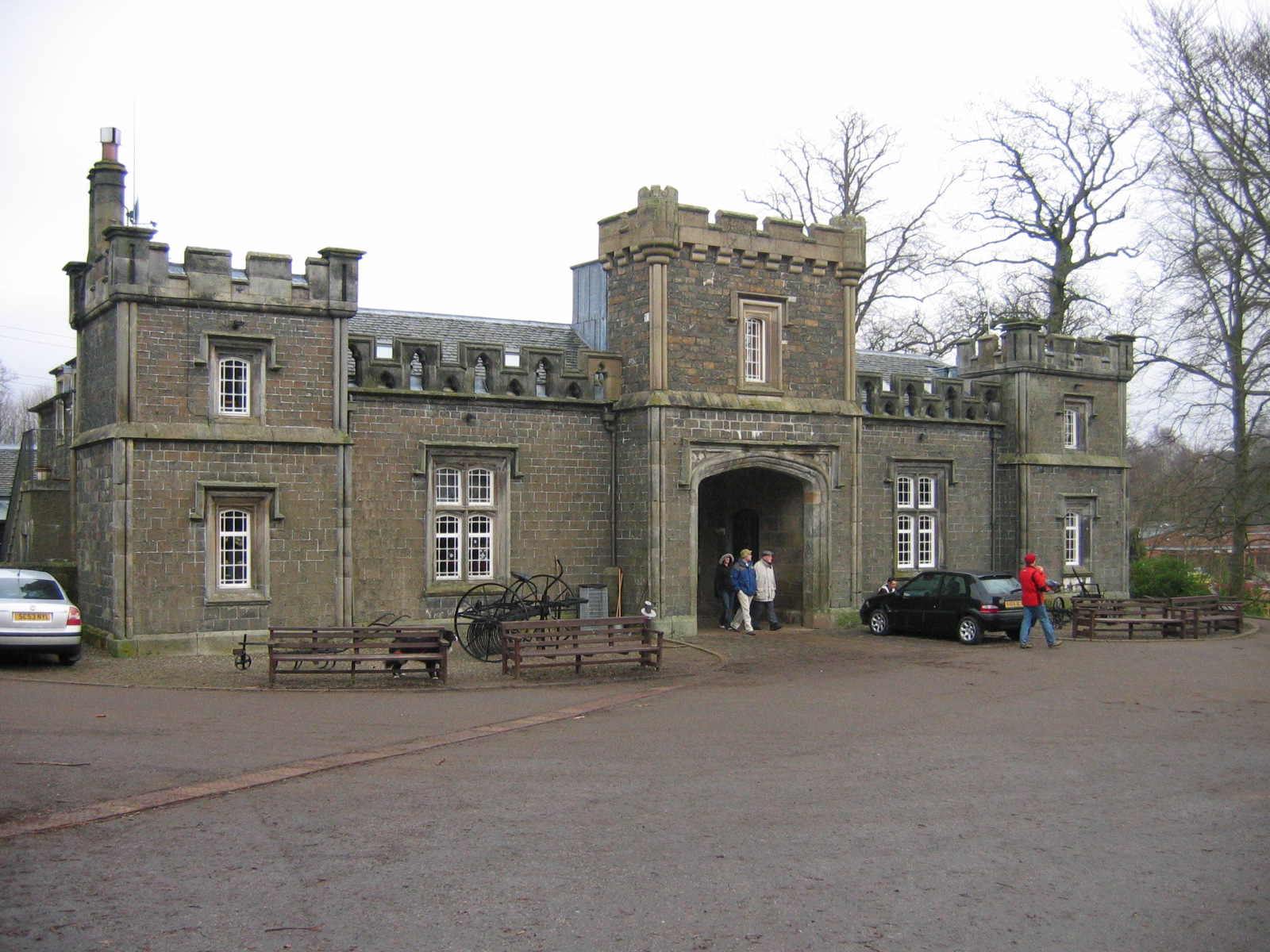
The former stable block
