= Loch Rusky =

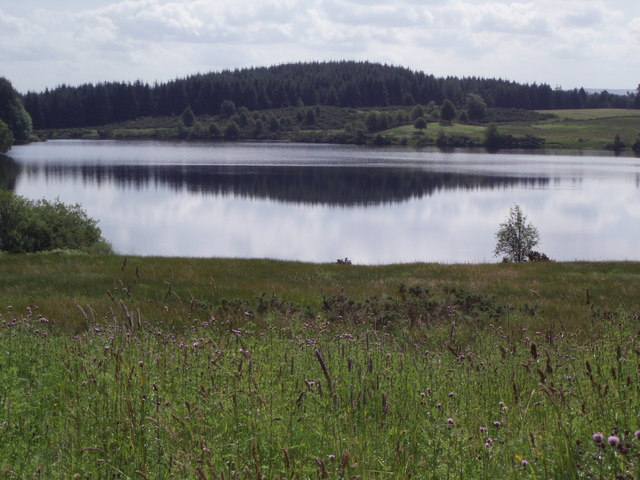

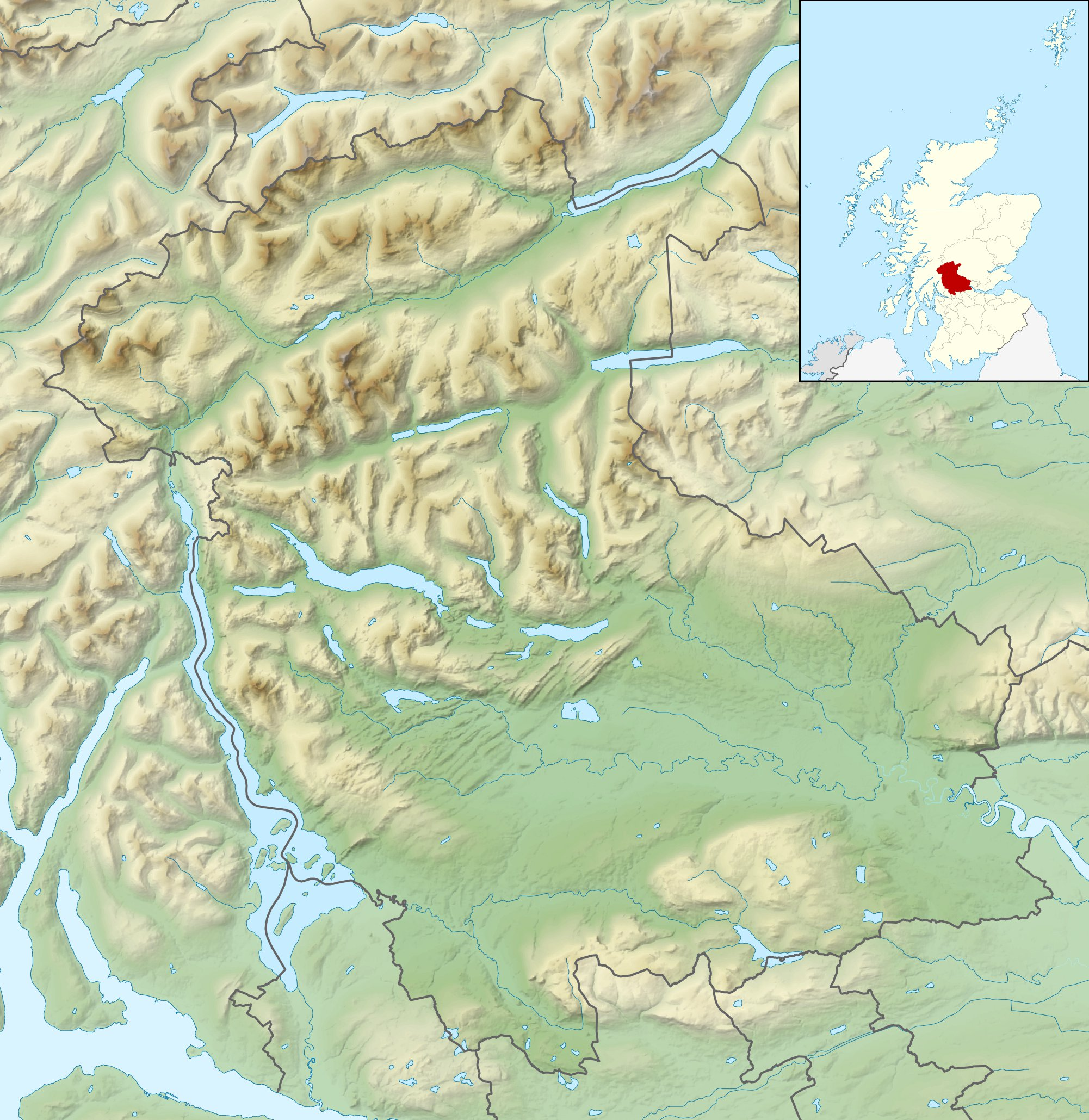
- Location within Stirling
- Location: Perthshire, Scotland
- Coordinates: 56°12′09″N 4°14′01″W
- Type: loch
- Basin countries: Scotland

Loch Rusky is a small freshwater loch near Callander in the Stirling council area in Scottish Highlands.

== Geography ==
The lake lies in the Registration County of Perthshire. The loch lies to the east of the Menteith Hills, about 6 km northeast of the Port of Menteith. The Torrie Forest extends over Lennieston Muir to the east.

== Toponymy ==
The name Rusky derives from the Gaelic Loch an Rusgaidh, meaning "Lake of the Shearing"or "Lake of the Turf/Peat".

== Fishing ==
Loch Rusky is well-known for a good stock of Rainbow and Brown trout with the odd small wild brown trout.

From the 1960s to the present day, the loch has been a trout fishery (fly only) from a boat and is managed by the Heriot Angling Parent Club (by permit only). *There are no pike or perch in the loch.*

== Wildlife ==
Loch Rusky is known for its beautiful wildlife including returning Osprey breeding pair, Mink, Otters, Herons, Woodpeckers and other wild birds.
