= Mugdock Country Park =

Country park in Scotland

Coordinates: 55°58′N 4°19′W

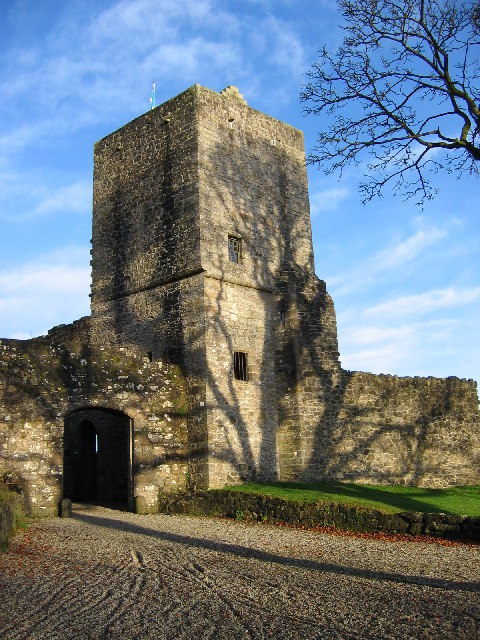
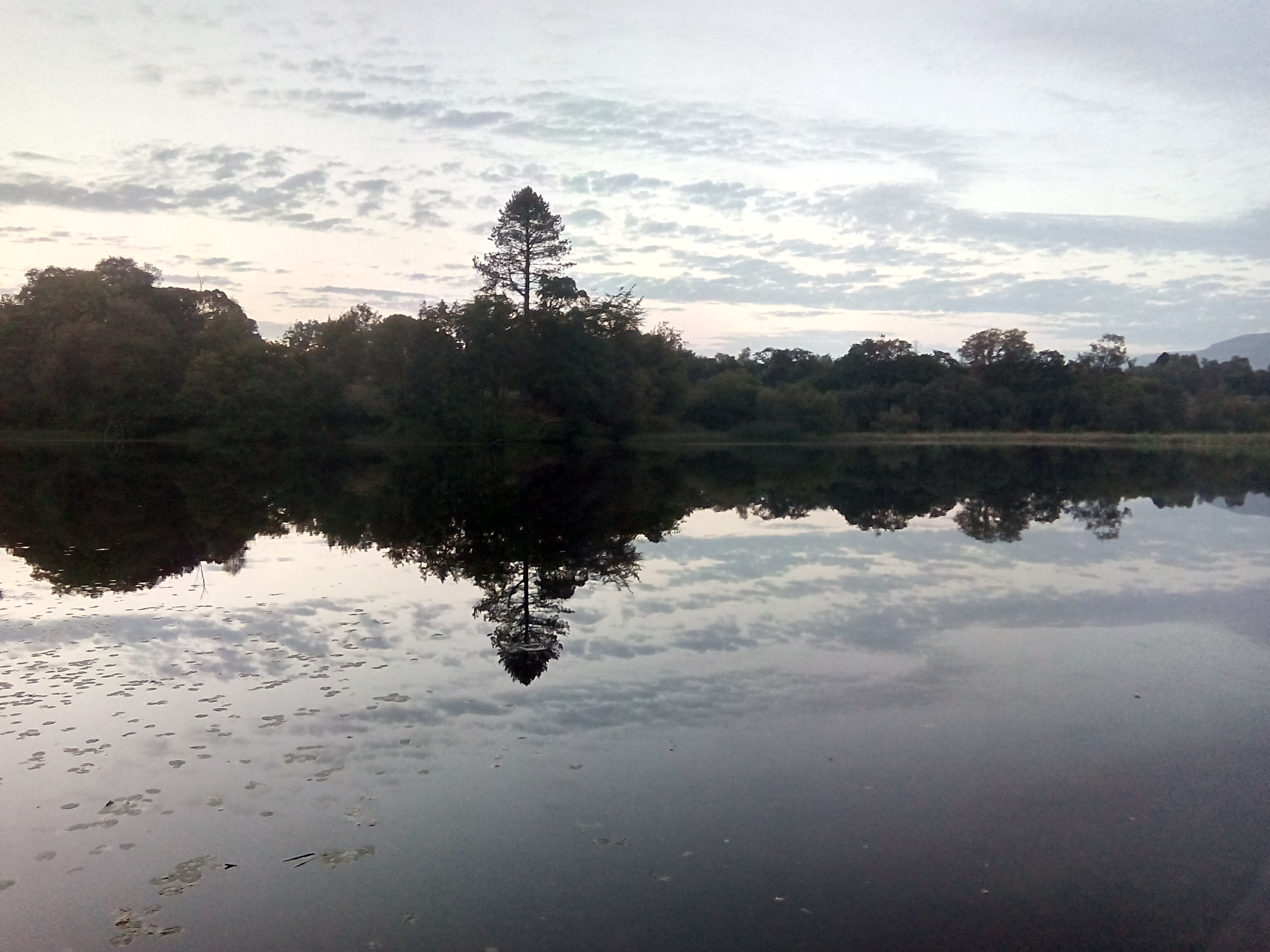
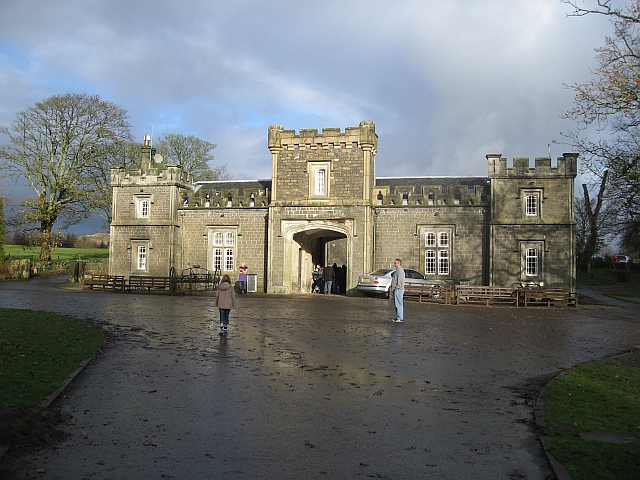
Mugdock Country Park

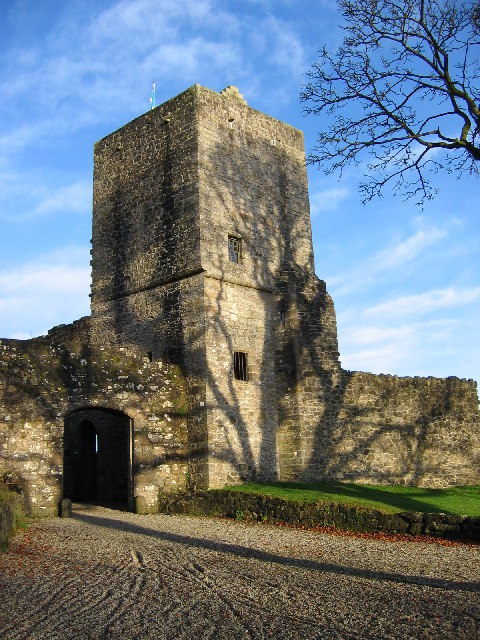
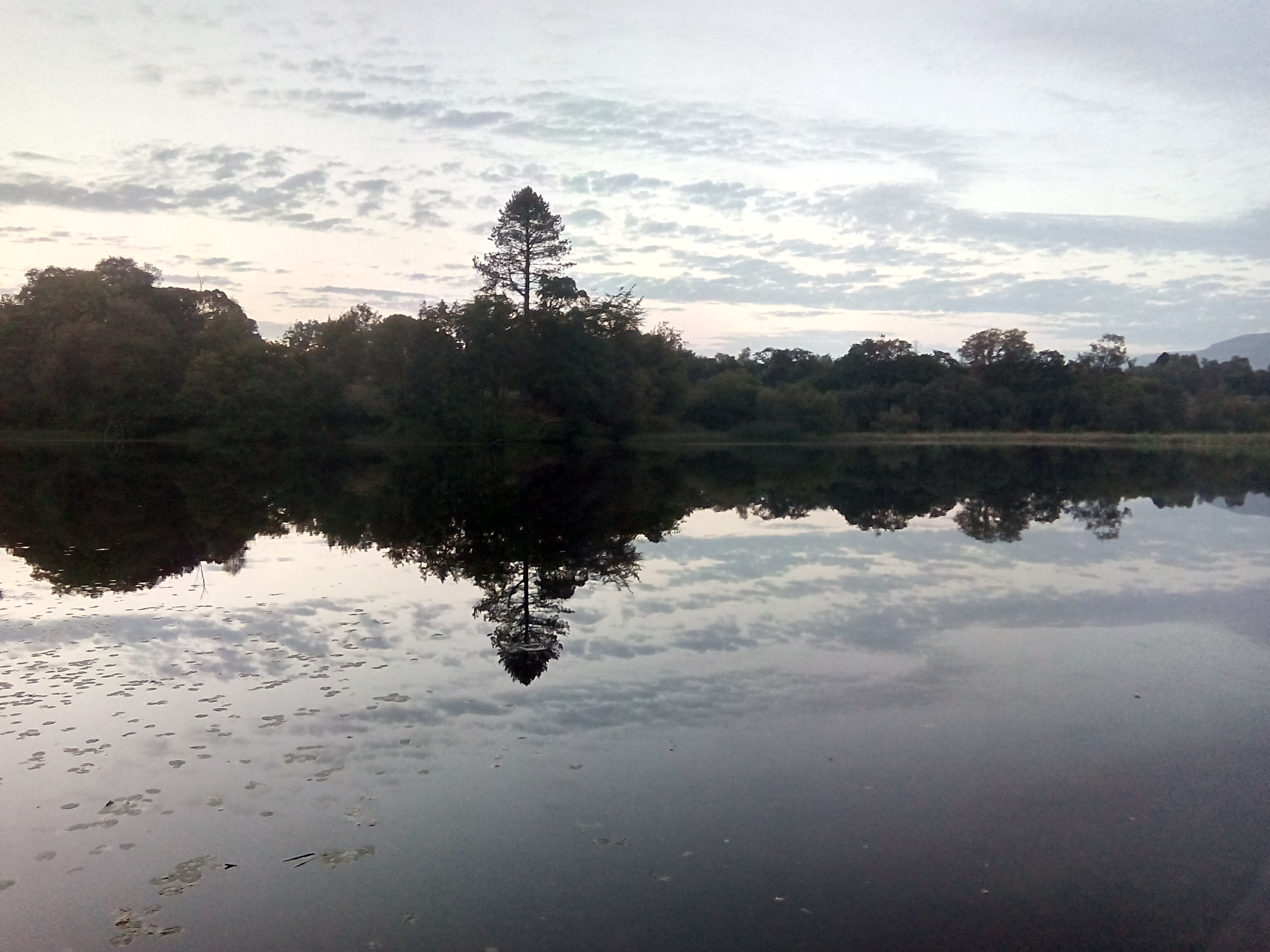
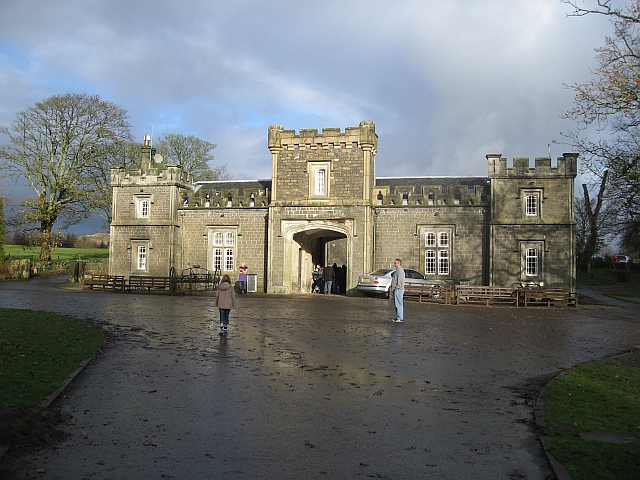
- Interactive map of Mugdock Country Park
- Type: Country park
- Location: East Dunbartonshire/Stirlingshire, Scotland
- Nearest city: Glasgow
- Area: 260 ha (642 acres)
- Status: Open

Mugdock Country Park is a country park and historical site located partly in East Dunbartonshire and partly in Stirling, in the former county of Stirlingshire, Scotland. It is around 10 miles (16 kilometres) north of Glasgow, next to Milngavie (from which the park is easily accessible), and covers an area of 260 hectares (642 acres).

The park includes the remains of the 14th-century Mugdock Castle, stronghold of the Grahams of Montrose, and the ruins of the 19th-century Craigend Castle, a Gothic Revival mansion and former zoo. The park has a moot hill and gallowhill, historical reminders of the baronial feudal right, held by lairds, of "pit and gallows". Also located in the park are the remains of numerous anti-aircraft trenches, which were established during World War II as part of the Clyde Basin anti-aircraft defense system.

The park was also the home of the Mugstock Music Festival, at which performers have included Emma Pollock, Dodgy and Beats Antique.

Natural features include the Allander Water, Mugdock Loch and Drumclog Muir, all of which provide popular walking and cycling routes with tourists. Visitor facilities include a visitor centre and cafe in the former Craigend Castle stable block, and a garden centre and restaurant in the walled garden.

The park is served by the Mugdock and East Dunbartonshire Countryside Ranger Service.

The West Highland Way, a linear long distance footpath between Milngavie and Fort William, passes through the outer areas of the park alongside the local Clyde Coastal Path.

Close again to the country park is Milngavie water treatment works, another popular walking and tourist attraction. It is situated just south of Mugdock and connects to the park via Drumclog Moor.

== See also ==
- List of places in East Dunbartonshire
- List of places in Scotland
